= 2016 Ohio elections =

Ohio elections, 2016
- 2016

The Ohio general elections, 2016 were held on November 8, 2016, throughout Ohio. The close of registration for electors in the primary election was December 16, 2015, and the primary election took place on March 15, 2016.

== Federal ==
=== Senate ===
Incumbent Republican senator Rob Portman won re-election to a second term in office, defeating former governor Ted Strickland.

=== House of Representatives ===
All of Ohio's 16 seats in the United States House of Representatives were up for election in 2016.

== State ==
=== General Assembly ===
==== Summary ====
Senate

Affiliation	Candidates	Votes	Vote %	Seats Won	Seats After
Republican	16	1,640,498	66.62%	14 (▲1)	24
Democratic	13	821,822	33.38%	2 (▼1)	9
Write-In	1	11	0.00%	0	
Total	30	2,462,331	100%	16	33

==== Senate ====
The 16 even-numbered districts out of 33 seats in the Ohio Senate were up for election in 2016. Twelve of these seats were held by Republicans, three were held by Democrats, and one seat was vacant. Prior to the election, Republicans held 23 seats and Democrats held 10 seats; after the election, Republicans gained an additional seat, giving them a 24 to 9 majority.

Senatorial district	Incumbent			This race	
District	Senator	Party	First elected	Incumbent Status	Candidates
2	Randy Gardner	Republican	2012	Running	√ Randy Gardner (Republican): 115,977 (66.56%); Kirk W. Halliday (Democratic): 58,271 (33.44%)
4	Bill Coley	Republican	2011 (Appointed)	Running	√ Bill Coley (Republican): 103,486 (67.91%); John D. Kinne (Democratic): 48,905 (32.09%)
6	Peggy Lehner	Republican	2011 (Appointed)	Running	√ Peggy Lehner (Republican): 111,448 (68.19%); Albert Griggs, Jr. (Democratic): 51,994 (31.81%)
8	Bill Seitz	Republican	2007 (Appointed)	Not Running (Term-limited)	√ Louis Terhar (Republican): 104,176 (63.22%); Mary Rose Lierman (Democratic): 60,610 (36.78%)
10	Vacant				√ Bob Hackett (Republican): 97,200 (65.29%); Matthew Kirk (Democratic): 51,664 (34.71%)
12	Keith Faber	Republican	2007 (Appointed)	Not Running (Term-limited)	√ Matt Huffman (Republican): 120,090 (100.00%)
14	Joe Uecker	Republican	2012	Running	√ Joe Uecker (Republican): 109,975 (71.97%); Charlie Carlier (Democratic): 42,840 (28.03%)
16	Jim Hughes	Republican	2008	Not Running (Term-limited)	√ Stephanie Kunze (Republican): 105,923 (59.02%); Cathy Johnson (Democratic): 73,556 (40.98%)
18	John Eklund	Republican	2011 (Appointed)	Running	√ John Eklund (Republican): 105,591 (65.39%); Wiley Runnestrand (Democratic): 55,886 (34.61%)
20	Troy Balderson	Republican	2011 (Appointed)	Running	√ Troy Balderson (Republican): 111,883 (100.00%)
22	Larry Obhof	Republican	2011 (Appointed)	Running	√ Larry Obhof (Republican): 111,626 (69.86%); Christopher King (Democratic): 48,138 (30.13%); Ashley Kemp (Write-in): 10 (0.01%)
24	Tom Patton	Republican	2008 (Appointed)	Not Running (Term-limited)	√ Matt Dolan (Republican): 105,353 (58.22%); Emily Hagan (Democratic): 75,595 (41.78%)
26	David Burke	Republican	2011 (Appointed)	Running	√ David Burke (Republican): 107,351 (100.00%)
28	Thomas C. Sawyer	Democratic	2007 (Appointed)	Not Running (Term-limited)	√ Vernon Sykes (Democratic): 80,713 (60.93%); Jonathan Schulz (Republican): 51,754 (39.07%)
30	Lou Gentile	Democratic	2011 (Appointed)	Running	√ Frank Hoagland (Republican): 82,450 (52.84%); Lou Gentile (Democratic): 73,591 (47.16%)
32	Capri Cafaro	Democratic	2007 (Appointed)	Not Running (Term-limited)	√ Sean O'Brien (Democratic): 76,840 (56.37%); Robert J. Allen (Republican): 59,841 (43.63%)

==== House of Representatives ====
All 99 seats in the Ohio House of Representatives were up for election in 2016. Prior to the election, Republicans held 65 seats and Democrats held 34 seats; after the election, Republicans gained an additional seat, giving them a 66 to 33 majority.

House district	Incumbent			This race	
District	Representative	Party	First elected	Incumbent Status	Candidates
1	Ron Amstutz	Republican	2008	Not Running (Term-limited)	Scott Wiggam (Republican)
2	Mark Romanchuk	Republican	2012	Running	Mark Romanchuk (Republican); Brittany Bowman (Democratic)
3	Tim Brown	Republican	2012	Running	Tim Brown (Republican); David Walters (Democratic)
4	Robert R. Cupp	Republican	2014	Running	Robert R. Cupp (Republican)
5	Tim Ginter	Republican	2014	Running	Tim Ginter (Republican); John R. Dyce (Democratic)
6	Marlene Anielski	Republican	2010	Running	Marlene Anielski (Republican); Phillip Robinson (Democratic)
7	Mike Dovilla	Republican	2010	Not Running	Tom Patton (Republican); David J. Thurau (Democratic)
8	Kent Smith	Democratic	2014	Running	Kent Smith (Democratic); Cassandra McDonald (Republican)
9	Janine Boyd	Democratic	2014	Running	Janine Boyd (Democratic); Joe Miller (Republican)
10	Bill Patmon	Democratic	2010	Running	Bill Patmon (Democratic); Thomas Pekarek (Republican)
11	Stephanie Howse	Democratic	2014	Running	Stephanie Howse (Democratic); Shalira Taylor (Republican)
12	John E. Barnes, Jr.	Democratic	2010	Running	John E. Barnes, Jr. (Democratic)
13	Nickie Antonio	Democratic	2010	Running	Nickie Antonio (Democratic)
14	Martin J. Sweeney	Democratic	2014	Running	Martin J. Sweeney (Democratic)
15	Nicholas J. Celebrezze	Democratic	2012 (Appointed)	Running	Nicholas J. Celebrezze (Democratic)
16	Nan Baker	Republican	2008	Not Running (Term-limited)	Dave Greenspan (Republican); Tommy Greene (Democratic)
17	Michael Curtin	Democratic	2012	Not Running	Adam Miller (Democratic); John Rush (Republican)
18	Kristin Boggs	Democratic	2016 (Appointed)	Running	Kristin Boggs (Democratic); Whitney Smith (Republican); Constance A. Gadell Newton (Green)
19	Anne Gonzales	Republican	2010	Running	Anne Gonzales (Republican); Michael Johnston (Democratic)
20	Heather Bishoff	Democratic	2012	Running	Heather Bishoff (Democratic); Lisa Schacht (Republican)
21	Mike Duffey	Republican	2010	Running	Mike Duffey (Republican); Ryan Koch (Democratic)
22	David J. Leland	Democratic	2014	Running	David J. Leland (Democratic); Linda L. Jarrett (Republican)
23	Cheryl Grossman	Republican	2008	Not Running (Term-limited)	Mike Lanese (Republican); Lee Schreiner (Democratic)
24	Stephanie Kunze	Republican	2012	Not Running	Jim Hughes (Republican); Kristopher Keller (Democratic)
25	Kevin Boyce	Democratic	2012 (Appointed)	Not Running	Bernadine Kennedy Kent (Democratic); Seth Golding (Republican)
26	Hearcel Craig	Democratic	2014	Running	Hearcel Craig (Democratic); Kenneth H. Collins (Republican)
27	Tom Brinkman	Republican	2014	Running	Tom Brinkman (Republican); Joe Otis (Democratic)
28	Jonathan Dever	Republican	2014	Running	Jonathan Dever (Republican); Jessica Miranda (Democratic)
29	Louis Blessing	Republican	2012	Running	Louis Blessing (Republican)
30	Louis Terhar	Republican	2011 (Appointed)	Not Running	Bill Seitz (Republican); Mark A. Childers (Democratic)
31	Denise Driehaus	Democratic	2008	Not Running (Term-limited)	Brigid Kelly (Democratic); Mary Yeager (Republican)
32	Christie Bryant	Democratic	2014	Not Running	Catherine Ingram (Democratic); Matthew H. Wahlert (Republican)
33	Alicia Reece	Democratic	2010 (Appointed)	Running	Alicia Reece (Democratic); David Miller (Republican)
34	Emilia Sykes	Democratic	2014	Running	Emilia Sykes (Democratic); Gene Littlefield (Republican)
35	Greta Johnson	Democratic	2014	Running	Greta Johnson (Democratic); Joe Vassel (Republican)
36	Anthony DeVitis	Republican	2011 (Appointed)	Running	Anthony DeVitis (Republican); Bobby McDowall (Democratic)
37	Kristina Roegner	Republican	2010	Running	Kristina Roegner (Republican); Tom Schmida (Democratic)
38	Marilyn Slaby	Republican	2012 (Appointed)	Running	Marilyn Slaby (Republican); Judith Lynn Lee (Democratic)
39	Fred Strahorn	Democratic	2012	Running	Fred Strahorn (Democratic)
40	Michael Henne	Republican	2010	Running	Michael Henne (Republican); David L. Richards (Democratic)
41	Jim Butler	Republican	2011 (Appointed)	Running	Jim Butler (Republican); James M. Calhoun (Democratic)
42	Niraj Antani	Republican	2014 (Appointed)	Running	Niraj Antani (Republican); Pat Merris (Democratic)
43	Jeff Rezabek	Republican	2014	Running	Jeff Rezabek (Republican); David B. Sparks (Democratic)
44	Michael Ashford	Democratic	2010	Running	Michael Ashford (Democratic); John Insco (Republican)
45	Teresa Fedor	Democratic	2010	Running	Teresa Fedor (Democratic); James S. Nowak (Republican)
46	Michael Sheehy	Democratic	2013 (Appointed)	Running	Michael Sheehy (Democratic); Diana M. Skaff (Republican)
47	Barbara Sears	Republican	2008 (Appointed)	Not Running (Term-limited)	Derek Merrin (Republican); Michael Sarantou (Democratic)
48	Kirk Schuring	Republican	2010	Running	Kirk Schuring (Republican); Jennifer M. Bigham (Democratic)
49	Stephen Slesnick	Democratic	2008 (Appointed)	Not Running (Term-limited)	Thomas E. West (Democratic); Dan F. McMasters (Republican)
50	Christina Hagan	Republican	2011 (Appointed)	Running	Christina Hagan (Republican); John L. Juergensen (Democratic)
51	Wes Retherford	Republican	2012	Running	Wes Retherford (Republican); Johnny H. Hamilton (Democratic)
52	Margaret Conditt	Republican	2011 (Appointed)	Running	Margaret Conditt (Republican)
53	Tim Derickson	Republican	2008	Not Running (Term-limited)	Candice Keller (Republican); Suzi Rubin (Democratic)
54	Paul Zeltwanger	Republican	2014	Running	Paul Zeltwanger (Republican); Rick Smith (Democratic)
55	Nathan Manning	Republican	2014	Running	Nathan Manning (Republican); Kevin Watkinson (Democratic)
56	Dan Ramos	Democratic	2010	Running	Dan Ramos (Democratic); Jessie Mae Tower (Republican)
57	Terry Boose	Republican	2008	Not Running (Term-limited)	Dick Stein (Republican); Tom Dunlap (Democratic)
58	Michele Lepore-Hagan	Democratic	2014	Running	Michele Lepore-Hagan (Democratic); Corrine Sanderson (Republican)
59	John Boccieri	Democratic	2015 (Appointed)	Running	John Boccieri (Democratic); Don Manning (Republican)
60	John Rogers	Democratic	2012	Running	John Rogers (Democratic); Robert Rule (Republican)
61	Ron Young	Republican	2010	Running	Ron Young (Republican); Rick Walker (Democratic)
62	Ron Maag	Republican	2008	Not Running (Term-limited)	Scott Lipps (Republican); Samuel P. Ronan (Democratic)
63	Sean O'Brien	Democratic	2010	Not Running	Glenn W. Holmes (Democratic); Devon A. Stanley (Republican)
64	Michael O'Brien	Democratic	2014	Running	Michael O'Brien (Democratic); Martha Yoder (Republican)
65	John Becker	Republican	2012	Running	John Becker (Republican); Amy Brewer (Democratic)
66	Doug Green	Republican	2012	Running	Doug Green (Republican); Ken P. McNeely, Jr. (Democratic)
67	Andrew Brenner	Republican	2010	Running	Andrew Brenner (Republican); Janet Breneman (Democratic)
68	Margaret Ruhl	Republican	2008	Not Running (Term-limited)	Rick Carfagna (Republican); John Russell (Democratic)
69	Steve Hambley	Republican	2014	Running	Steve Hambley (Republican); Frank A. Zona (Democratic)
70	Dave Hall	Republican	2008	Not Running (Term-limited)	Darrell D. Kick (Republican)
71	Scott Ryan	Republican	2014	Running	Scott Ryan (Republican); Joseph S. Begeny (Democratic)
72	Bill Hayes	Republican	2010	Not Running	Larry Householder (Republican); John J. Carlisle (Democratic)
73	Rick Perales	Republican	2012	Running	Rick Perales (Republican); Brian K. Housh (Democratic)
74	Bob Hackett	Republican	2008	Not Running (Term-limited)	Bill Dean (Republican); Barb Niemeyer (Democratic)
75	Kathleen Clyde	Democratic	2010	Running	Kathleen Clyde (Democratic); Jim Lutz (Republican)
76	Sarah LaTourette	Republican	2014	Running	Sarah LaTourette (Republican); Terri McIntee (Democratic)
77	Tim Schaffer	Republican	2014	Running	Tim Schaffer (Republican); Bradley S. Nicodemus (Democratic)
78	Ron Hood	Republican	2012	Running	Ron Hood (Republican)
79	Kyle Koehler	Republican	2014	Running	Kyle Koehler (Republican); Alex Wendt (Democratic)
80	Steve Huffman	Republican	2014	Running	Steve Huffman (Republican)
81	Rob McColley	Republican	2014	Running	Rob McColley (Republican)
82	Tony Burkley	Republican	2012	Running (Lost Primary Election)	Craig Riedel (Republican)
83	Robert Sprague	Republican	2011 (Appointed)	Running	Robert Sprague (Republican); Mary E. Harshfield (Democratic)
84	Jim Buchy	Republican	2011 (Appointed)	Not Running	Keith Faber (Republican); Ed Huff, Jr. (Democratic)
85	Nino Vitale	Republican	2014	Running	Nino Vitale (Republican)
86	Dorothy Pelanda	Republican	2011 (Appointed)	Running	Dorothy Pelanda (Republican); Scott Crider (Democratic)
87	Jeffrey McClain	Republican	2008	Not Running (Term-limited)	Wes Goodman (Republican)
88	Bill Reineke	Republican	2014	Running	Bill Reineke (Republican)
89	Steve Arndt	Republican	2015 (Appointed)	Running	Steve Arndt (Republican); Lawrence D. Hartlaub (Democratic)
90	Terry Johnson	Republican	2010	Running	Terry Johnson (Republican); Tara Cordle (Democratic)
91	Cliff Rosenberger	Republican	2010	Running	Cliff Rosenberger (Republican)
92	Gary Scherer	Republican	2012 (Appointed)	Running	Gary Scherer (Republican)
93	Ryan Smith	Republican	2012 (Appointed)	Running	Ryan Smith (Republican)
94	Debbie Phillips	Democratic	2008	Not Running (Term-limited)	Sarah H. Grace (Democratic); Jay Edwards (Republican)
95	Andy Thompson	Republican	2010	Running	Andy Thompson (Republican); Ginny Favede (Democratic)
96	Jack Cera	Democratic	2011 (Appointed)	Running	Jack Cera (Democratic)
97	Brian Hill	Republican	2011 (Appointed)	Running	Brian Hill (Republican)
98	Al Landis	Republican	2010	Running	Al Landis (Republican); Jeremiah M. Johnson (Democratic)
99	John Patterson	Democratic	2012	Running	John Patterson (Democratic)

=== Supreme Court ===
2016 Ohio Supreme Court elections
- November 8, 2016

3 seats of the Supreme Court of Ohio
	Majority party	Minority party
Party	Republican	Democratic
Last election	6	1
Seats won	3	0
Seat change	Steady	Steady

While judicial races in Ohio are technically non-partisan (party affiliations are not listed on the ballot), candidates run in party primaries. Terms are six years, and justices may run for re-election an unlimited number of times before their 70th birthday. The Supreme Court currently consists of 6 Republicans and 1 Democrat.

==== Chief Justice ====
===== Republican primary =====
====== Candidates ======
- Maureen O'Connor, incumbent chief justice of the Supreme Court of Ohio

====== Results ======
Republican primary results
Party	Candidate	Votes	%
Republican	Maureen O'Connor (incumbent)	1,353,231	100.0%
Total votes		1,353,231	100.0%

===== General election =====
====== Results ======
2016 Ohio Supreme Court Chief Justice election
Party	Candidate	Votes	%
Nonpartisan	Maureen O'Connor (incumbent)	3,562,413	100.0%
Total votes		3,562,413	100.0%
Republican hold			

==== Associate Justice (Term commencing 01/01/2017) ====
2016 Ohio Supreme Court election (Lanzinger seat)
- November 8, 2016
Nominee	Patrick F. Fischer	John O'Donnell
Party	Nonpartisan	Nonpartisan
Alliance	Republican	Democratic
Popular vote	2,044,984	2,022,514
Percentage	50.3%	49.7%
- Fischer: 50–60% 60–70% O'Donnell: 50–60%
Justice before election
Judith Ann Lanzinger
Republican
Elected Justice
Patrick F. Fischer
Republican

Justice Judith Ann Lanzinger, a Republican, did not seek reelection, as she had reached the mandatory retirement age.

===== Republican primary =====
====== Candidates ======
- Patrick F. Fischer, incumbent Judge of the Ohio Court of Appeals for the 1st District
- Colleen Mary O'Toole, incumbent Judge of the Ohio Court of Appeals for the 11th District

====== Results ======
Republican primary results
Party	Candidate	Votes	%
Republican	Pat Fischer	761,771	54.26%
Republican	Colleen Mary O'Toole	642,048	45.74%
Total votes		1,403,819	100.0%

===== Democratic primary =====
====== Candidates ======
- John P. O'Donnell, Cuyahoga County Court of Common Pleas judge and candidate for Ohio Supreme Court in 2014

====== Results ======
Democratic primary results
Party	Candidate	Votes	%
Democratic	John P. O'Donnell	776,945	100.0%
Total votes		776,945	100.0%

===== General election =====
====== Results ======
2016 Ohio Supreme Court Associate Justice (Term commencing 01/01/2017) election
Party	Candidate	Votes	%
Nonpartisan	Pat Fischer	2,044,984	50.28%
Nonpartisan	John P. O'Donnell	2,022,514	49.72%
Total votes		4,067,498	100.0%
Republican hold			

==== Associate Justice (Term commencing 01/02/2017) ====
Justice Paul Pfeifer, a Republican, did not seek reelection, as he had reached the mandatory retirement age.

===== Republican primary =====
====== Candidates ======
- Pat DeWine, incumbent Judge of the Ohio Court of Appeals for the 1st District and son of Mike DeWine, incumbent Ohio Attorney General and former U.S. Senator

====== Results ======
Republican primary results
Party	Candidate	Votes	%
Republican	Pat DeWine	1,336,648	100.0%
Total votes		1,336,648	100.0%

===== Democratic primary =====
====== Candidates ======
- Cynthia Rice, incumbent Judge of the Ohio Court of Appeals for the 11th District

====== Results ======
Democratic primary results
Party	Candidate	Votes	%
Democratic	Cynthia Rice	807,997	100.0%
Total votes		807,997	100.0%

===== General election =====
====== Results ======
2016 Ohio Supreme Court Associate Justice (Term commencing 01/02/2017) election
Party	Candidate	Votes	%
Nonpartisan	Pat DeWine	2,438,641	56.31%
Nonpartisan	Cynthia Rice	1,892,450	43.69%
Total votes		4,331,091	100.0%
Republican hold			

=== Courts of Appeal ===
The Ohio District Courts of Appeals consists of 69 judges in 12 districts. Judges serve a 6-year term. Twenty-seven of these positions were up for election in 2016.
