= Ohio House Committees =

The Ohio House Committees are the legislative sub-organizations in the Ohio House of Representatives that handle specific topics of legislation that come before the full House of Representatives. Committee membership enables members to develop specialized knowledge of the matters under their jurisdiction.

== Agriculture & Rural Development ==
Majority	Minority
Brian Hill, Chair; Tony Burkley, Vice Chair; Terry Boose; Jim Buchy; Christina Hagan; Steve Kraus; Sarah LaTourette; Wes Retherford; Jeff Rezabek; Margaret Ruhl; Tim Schaffer; Andy Thompson; Nino Vitale; Paul Zeltwanger	John Patterson, Ranking Member; Jack Cera; Michael O'Brien; Sean O'Brien; Bill Patmon; Debbie Phillips; Michael Sheehy

== Armed Services, Veterans Affairs and Public Safety ==
Majority	Minority
Terry Johnson, Chair; Rick Perales, Vice Chair; Marlene Anielski; Steve Kraus; Al Landis; Wes Retherford; Louis Terhar; Nino Vitale; Ron Young; Paul Zeltwanger	Hearcel Craig, Ranking Member; Heather Bishoff; Teresa Fedor; Greta Johnson; Michael O'Brien

== Community & Family Advancement ==
Majority	Minority
Timothy Derickson, Chair; Tim Ginter, Vice Chair; Niraj Antani; Margaret Conditt; Jonathan Dever; Christina Hagan; Bill Hayes; Ron Hood; Jeffrey McClain; Ron Young	Stephanie Howse, Ranking Member; Kevin Boyce; Janine Boyd; Michele Lepore-Hagan; Bill Patmon

Subcommittee	Chair
Subcommittee on Minority Affairs	Kevin Boyce (D)

== Commerce & Labor ==
Majority	Minority
Ron Young, Chair; Anthony DeVitis, Vice Chair; Louis Blessing; Tom Brinkman; Mike Duffey; Ron Hood; Kyle Koehler; Al Landis; Dorothy Liggett Pelanda; Kristina Roegner	Michele Lepore-Hagan, Ranking Member; Teresa Fedor; Alicia Reece; Stephen Slesnick; Martin Sweeney

== Economic & Workforce Development ==
Majority	Minority
Nan Baker, Chair; Mark Romanchuk, Vice Chair; Niraj Antani; Kyle Koehler; Steve Kraus; Rick Perales; Scott Ryan; Ron Young; Paul Zeltwanger	Kent Smith, Ranking Member; John E. Barnes Jr.; Hearcel Craig; Denise Driehaus

== Education ==
Majority	Minority
Bill Hayes, Chair; Andrew Brenner, Vice Chair; Louis Blessing; Robert Cupp; Timothy Derickson; Michael Henne; Steve Huffman; Kyle Koehler; Nathan Manning; Kristina Roegner; Marilyn Slaby; Ryan Smith	Teresa Fedor, Ranking Member; Janine Boyd; Bill Patmon; John Patterson; Debbie Phillips; Dan Ramos; Kent Smith

== Energy & Natural Resources ==
Majority	Minority
Al Landis, Chair; Christina Hagan, Vice Chair; Cheryl Grossman; Dave Hall; Brian Hill; Ron Maag; Marilyn Slaby; Louis Terhar; Andy Thompson	Sean O'Brien, Ranking Member; Jack Cera; Stephanie Howse; David Leland

== Finance & Appropriations ==
Majority	Minority
Ryan Smith, Chair; Kirk Schuring, Vice Chair; Marlene Anielski; Tony Burkley; Robert Cupp; Timothy Derickson; Mike Dovilla; Mike Duffey; Doug Green; Cheryl Grossman; Dave Hall; Stephanie Kunze; Ron Maag; Jeffrey McClain; Rick Perales; Bill Reineke; Mark Romanchuk; Gary Scherer; Barbara Sears; Robert Sprague; Andy Thompson	Denise Driehaus, Ranking Member; Nickie Antonio; Kevin Boyce; Jack Cera; Kathleen Clyde; Michael O'Brien; John Patterson; Debbie Phillips; Dan Ramos; Alicia Reece; Emilia Sykes

Subcommittee	Chair	Ranking Member
Agriculture, Development and Natural Resources	Andy Thompson (R)	Sean O'Brien (D)
Health & Human Services	Robert Sprague (R)	Emilia Sykes (D)
Higher Education	Mike Duffey (R)	Dan Ramos (D)
Transportation	Cheryl Grossman (R)	Alicia Reece (D)
Primary and Secondary Education	Robert Cupp (R)	Debbie Phillips (D)

== Financial Institutions, Housing and Urban Development ==
Majority	Minority
Louis Terhar, Chair; Steve Hambley, Vice Chair; Andrew Brenner; Tim Brown; Mike Dovilla; Robert Hackett; Bill Reineke; Gary Scherer; Robert Sprague	Christie Bryant, Ranking Member; Hearcel Craig; David Leland; Kent Smith

== Government Accountability & Oversight ==
Majority	Minority
Tim Brown, Chair; Louis Blessing, Vice Chair; Jim Buchy; Jim Butler; Timothy Derickson; Doug Green; Rob McColley; Dorothy Liggett Pelanda; Ryan Smith	Kathleen Clyde, Ranking Member; Michael Curtin; Ron Gerberry; David Leland

== Health & Aging ==
Majority	Minority
Anne Gonzales, Chair; Steve Huffman, Vice Chair; Tim Brown; Jim Butler; Mike Duffey; Tim Ginter; Terry Johnson; Sarah LaTourette; Ron Maag; Kirk Schuring; Barbara Sears; Robert Sprague	Nickie Antonio, Ranking Member; John E. Barnes Jr.; Heather Bishoff; Christie Bryant; Michele Lepore-Hagan; Dan Ramos; Emilia Sykes

== Insurance ==
Majority	Minority
Bob Hackett, Chair; Michael Henne, Vice Chair; Tom Brinkman; Anthony DeVitis; Anne Gonzales; Stephanie Kunze; Wes Retherford; Kristina Roegner; Barbara Sears	Heather Bishoff, Ranking Member; Michael Ashford; Christie Bryant; Michael Stinziano

== Judiciary ==
Majority	Minority
Jim Butler, Chair; Nathan Manning, Vice Chair; Niraj Antani; Margaret Conditt; Robert Cupp; Jonathan Dever; Rob McColley; Dorothy Liggett Pelanda; Jeff Rezabek	Michael Stinziano, Ranking Member; Nicholas J. Celebrezze; Greta Johnson; Emilia Sykes

== Local Government ==
Majority	Minority
Marlene Anielski, Chair; Scott Ryan, Vice Chair; Nan Baker; John Becker; Terry Boose; Steve Hambley; Jeff Rezabek; Margaret Ruhl; Nino Vitale	John Rogers, Ranking Member; Michael Ashford; Janine Boyd; Alicia Reece

== Public Utilities ==
Majority	Minority
Tim Schaffer, Chair; Kristina Roegner, Vice Chair; Ron Amstutz; Tom Brinkman; Jim Buchy; Margaret Conditt; Robert Cupp; Mike Dovilla; Tim Ginter; Christina Hagan; Dave Hall; Brian Hill; Nathan Manning; Mark Romanchuk; Scott Ryan	Michael Ashford, Ranking Member; Kathleen Clyde; Sean O'Brien; John Rogers; Michael Sheehy; Stephen Slesnick; Kent Smith; Michael Stinziano

== Rules & Reference ==
Majority	Minority
Ron Amstutz, Chair; Cliff Rosenberger, Vice Chair; Andrew Brenner; Cheryl Grossman; Bill Hayes; Ron Hood; Dorothy Liggett Pelanda; Kirk Schuring	Fred Strahorn, Ranking Member; Nickie Antonio; Kevin Boyce; Nicholas J. Celebrezze; Dan Ramos

== State Government ==
Majority	Minority
Ron Maag, Chair; Stephanie Kunze, Vice Chair; John Becker; Cheryl Grossman; Bob Hackett; Ron Hood; Steve Huffman; Sarah LaTourette; Rick Perales	Ron Gerberry, Ranking Member; Michael Curtin; Stephen Slesnick; Martin Sweeney

== Transportation & Infrastructure ==
Majority	Minority
Terry Boose, Chair; Doug Green, Vice Chair; Niraj Antani; John Becker; Jonathan Dever; Anthony DeVitis; Mike Dovilla; Terry Johnson; Margaret Ruhl; Nino Vitale	Michael Sheehy, Ranking Member; Stephanie Howse; Greta Johnson; Michele Lepore-Hagan; Martin Sweeney

== Ways & Means ==
Majority	Minority
Jeffrey McClain, Chair; Gary Scherer, Vice Chair; Ron Amstutz; Nan Baker; Terry Boose; Tony Burkley; Jonathan Dever; Steve Hambley; Michael Henne; Rob McColley; Bill Reineke; Scott Ryan; Tim Schaffer; Marilyn Slaby	Jack Cera, Ranking Member; John E. Barnes Jr.; Michael Curtin; Denise Driehaus; John Rogers; Michael Sheehy; Emilia Sykes

== Links ==
- The Ohio House of Representatives
