= 2020 Ohio elections =

- November 3, 2020

The 2020 Ohio general elections were held on November 3, 2020 throughout the US state of Ohio. The office of the Ohio Secretary of State oversees the election process, including voting and vote counting.

To vote by mail, registered Ohio voters must have requested a ballot by October 31, 2020. As of early October some 2,112,685 voters have requested mail ballots.

== Federal offices ==
=== President ===
Trump won 53.3% compared to Biden's 45.2%

=== Senate ===
There is no U.S. Senate election in Ohio in 2020. Democratic Senator Sherrod Brown was elected in 2018, and incumbent Republican Senator Rob Portman retired and was replaced by Republican JD Vance in 2022.

=== House of Representatives ===
All of Ohio's 16 seats in the United States House of Representatives were up for election in 2020. Ohio's delegation to the United States House of Representatives remained at 12 Republicans and 4 Democrats.

== State offices ==
=== Board of education ===
6 of Ohio's 19 Board of Education Seats were up in 2020.

Board of Education District	Incumbent	Member Elected
1	Linda Haycock	Diana Fessler
5	Lisa Woods	Christina Collins
6	Antioniette Miranda	Antioniette Miranda
9	Stephaine Dodd	Michelle Newman
10	Nick Owens	Brendan Shea
11	Meryl Johnson	Meryl Johnson

=== General Assembly ===
==== Senate ====
The 16 even-numbered districts out of 33 seats in the Ohio Senate are up for election in 2020. Fourteen of these seats are held by Republicans and two are held by Democrats. Prior to the election, Republicans hold 24 seats and Democrats hold 9 seats.

Senatorial district	Incumbent			This race	
District	Senator	Party	First elected	Incumbent Status	Candidates
2	Theresa Gavarone	Republican	2019 (Appointed)	Running	Theresa Gavarone (R) Joel O'Dorisio (D)
4	Bill Coley	Republican	2011 (Appointed)	Not Running (Term-limited)	George Lang (R) Kathy Wyenandt (D) Kent Keller (I)
6	Peggy Lehner	Republican	2011 (Appointed)	Not Running (Term-limited)	Niraj Antani (R) Mark Fogel (D)
8	Louis Blessing	Republican	2019 (Appointed)	Running	Louis Blessing (R) Daniel Brown (D)
10	Bob Hackett	Republican	2016 (Appointed)	Running	Bob Hackett (R) Charles Ballard (D)
12	Matt Huffman	Republican	2016	Running	Matt Huffman (R) Ken Poling (D)
14	Terry Johnson	Republican	2019 (Appointed)	Running	Terry Johnson (R) Ryan Ottney (D)
16	Stephanie Kunze	Republican	2016	Running	Stephanie Kunze (R) Crystal Lett (D)
18	John Eklund	Republican	2011 (Appointed)	Not Running (Term-limited)	Jerry Cirino (R) Besty Rader (D)
20	Tim Schaffer	Republican	2018 (Appointed)	Running	Tim Schaffer (R) Christian Johnson (D)
22	Larry Obhof	Republican	2011 (Appointed)	Not Running (Term-limited)	Mark Romanchuk (R) Ryan Hunger (D)
24	Matt Dolan	Republican	2016	Running	Matt Dolan (R) Tom Jackson (D)
26	David Burke	Republican	2011 (Appointed)	Not Running (Term-limited)	Bill Reineke (R) Craig Swartz (D) Robert Taylor (I)
28	Vernon Sykes	Democratic	2016	Running	Vernon Sykes (D) Micheal Downey (R)
30	Frank Hoagland	Republican	2016	Running	Frank Hoagland (R) Micheal Fletcher (D)
32	Sean O'Brien	Democratic	2016	Running	Sandra O'Brien (R) Sean O'Brien (D) (i)

==== House of Representatives ====
All 99 seats in the Ohio House of Representatives are up for election in 2020. Prior to the election, Republicans hold 61 seats and Democrats hold 38 seats.

House district	Incumbent			This race	
District	Representative	Party	First elected	Incumbent Status	Candidates
1	Scott Wiggam	Republican	2016	Running	
2	Mark Romanchuk	Republican	2012	Not Running (Term-limited)	
3	Haraz Ghanbari	Republican	2019 (Appointed)	Running	
4	Robert R. Cupp	Republican	2014	Running	
5	Tim Ginter	Republican	2014	Running	
6	Phil Robinson	Democratic	2018	Running	
7	Tom Patton	Republican	2016	Running	
8	Kent Smith	Democratic	2014	Running	
9	Janine Boyd	Democratic	2014	Running	
10	Terrence Upchurch	Democratic	2018	Running	
11	Stephanie Howse	Democratic	2014	Running	
12	Juanita Brent	Democratic	2018	Running	
13	Michael J. Skindell	Democratic	2018	Running	
14	Bride Rose Sweeney	Democratic	2018	Running	
15	Jeffrey Crossman	Democratic	2018	Running	
16	David Greenspan	Republican	2016	Running	
17	Adam Miller	Democratic	2016	Running	
18	Kristin Boggs	Democratic	2016 (Appointed)	Running	
19	Mary Lightbody	Democratic	2018	Running	
20	Richard Brown	Democratic	2017 (Appointed)	Running	
21	Beth Liston	Democratic	2018	Running	
22	David J. Leland	Democratic	2014	Running	
23	Laura Lanese	Republican	2016	Running	
24	Allison Russo	Democratic	2018	Running	
25	Bernadine Kent	Democratic	2016	Not Running	
26	Erica Crawley	Democratic	2018	Running	
27	Tom Brinkman	Republican	2014	Running	
28	Jessica Miranda	Democratic	2018	Running	
29	Cindy Abrams	Republican	2019 (Appointed)	Running	
30	Bill Seitz	Republican	2016	Running	
31	Brigid Kelly	Democratic	2016	Running	
32	Catherine Ingram	Democratic	2016	Running	
33	Sedrick Denson	Democratic	2018	Running	
34	Emilia Sykes	Democratic	2014	Running	
35	Tavia Galonski	Democratic	2017 (Appointed)	Running	
36	Anthony DeVitis	Republican	2011 (Appointed)	Not Running (Term-limited)	
37	Casey Weinstein	Democratic	2018	Running	
38	Bill Roemer	Republican	2018	Running	
39	Fred Strahorn	Democratic	2012	Not Running (Term-limited)	
40	Phil Plummer	Republican	2018	Running	
41	Jim Butler	Republican	2011 (Appointed)	Not Running (Term-limited)	
42	Niraj Antani	Republican	2014 (appointed)	Not running (running for state senator)	
43	Jeffery Todd Smith	Republican	2018	Running	
44	Paula Hicks-Hudson	Democratic	2018	Running	
45	Lisa Sobecki	Democratic	2018	Running	
46	Michael Sheehy	Democratic	2013 (Appointed)	Running	
47	Derek Merrin	Republican	2016 (Appointed)	Running	
48	Scott Oelslager	Republican	2018	Running	
49	Thomas West	Democratic	2016	Running	
50	Reggie Stoltzfus	Republican	2018	Running	
51	Sara Carruthers	Republican	2018	Running	
52	George Lang	Republican	2017 (appointed)	Not running (running for state senator)	
53	Candice Keller	Republican	2016 (appointed)	Not running (running for state senator)	
54	Paul Zeltwanger	Republican	2014	Running	
55	Gayle Manning	Republican	2018	Running	
56	Joe Miller	Democratic	2018	Running	
57	Dick Stein	Republican	2016	Running	
58	Michele Lepore-Hagan	Democratic	2014	Running	
59	Don Manning	Republican	2018	Not Running (Deceased)	
60	John Rogers	Democratic	2012	Not Running (Term-limited)	
61	Jamie Callender	Republican	2018	Running	
62	Scott Lipps	Republican	2016	Running	
63	Gil Blair	Democratic	2019 (Appointed)	Running	
64	Michael O'Brien	Democratic	2014	Running	
65	John Becker	Republican	2012	Not Running (Term-limited)	
66	Doug Green	Republican	2012	Not Running (Term-limited)	
67	Kris Jordan	Republican	2018	Running	
68	Rick Carfagna	Republican	2016	Running	
69	Steve Hambley	Republican	2014	Not running (running for Medina County Commissioner)	
70	Darrell Kick	Republican	2016	Running	
71	Mark Fraizer	Republican	2019 (Appointed)	Running	
72	Larry Householder	Republican	2016	Running	
73	Rick Perales	Republican	2012	Not Running (Term-limited)	
74	Bill Dean	Republican	2016 (Appointed)	Running	
75	Randi Clites	Democratic	2018	Running	
76	Diane Grendell	Republican	2019 (Appointed)	Running	
77	Jeffrey LaRe	Republican	2019 (Appointed)	Running	
78	Ron Hood	Republican	2012	Not Running (Term-limited)	
79	Kyle Koehler	Republican	2014	Running	
80	Jena Powell	Republican	2018	Running	
81	Jim Hoops	Republican	2018 (Appointed)	Running	
82	Craig Riedel	Republican	2016	Running	
83	Jon Cross	Republican	2018	Running	
84	Susan Manchester	Republican	2018	Running	
85	Nino Vitale	Republican	2014	Running	
86	Tracy Richardson	Republican	2018	Running	
87	Riordan McClain	Republican	2018 (Appointed)	Running	
88	Bill Reineke	Republican	2014	Not running (running for state senator)	
89	D. J. Swearingen	Republican	2019 (Appointed)	Running	
90	Brian Baldridge	Republican	2018	Running	
91	Shane Wilkin	Republican	2018 (Appointed)	Running	
92	Gary Scherer	Republican	2012 (Appointed)	Not Running (Term-limited)	
93	Jason Stephens	Republican	2018	Running	
94	Jay Edwards	Republican	2016	Running	
95	Don Jones	Republican	2018	Running	
96	Jack Cera	Democratic	2011 (Appointed)	Not Running (Term-limited)	
97	Adam Holmes	Republican	2018	Running	
98	Brett Hillyer	Republican	2018	Running	
99	John Patterson	Democratic	2012	Not Running (Term-limited)	

== Supreme Court ==
2020 Ohio Supreme Court elections
- November 3, 2020

2 seats of the Supreme Court of Ohio
	Majority party	Minority party
Party	Republican	Democratic
Last election	5	2
Seats won	1	1
Seat change	▼1	▲1

While judicial races in Ohio are technically non-partisan (party affiliations are not listed on the ballot), candidates run in party primaries. Terms are six years, and justices may run for re-election an unlimited number of times before their 70th birthday.

=== Associate Justice (Term commencing 01/01/2021) ===
2020 Ohio Supreme Court election (Kennedy seat)
- November 3, 2020
Nominee	Sharon Kennedy	John O'Donnell
Party	Nonpartisan	Nonpartisan
Alliance	Republican	Democratic
Popular vote	2,735,041	2,231,724
Percentage	55.1%	44.9%
- County results Kennedy: 50–60% 60–70% 70–80% O'Donnell: 50–60%
Justice before election
Sharon Kennedy
Republican
Elected Justice
Sharon Kennedy
Republican

==== Republican primary ====
===== Candidates =====
- Sharon Kennedy, incumbent Associate Justice of the Supreme Court of Ohio

===== Results =====
Republican primary results
Party	Candidate	Votes	%
Republican	Sharon Kennedy (incumbent)	637,255	100.0%
Total votes		637,255	100.0%

==== Democratic primary ====
===== Candidates =====
- John O'Donnell, Cuyahoga County Court of Common Pleas, General Division judge and candidate for Ohio Supreme Court in 2014 and 2016

===== Results =====
Democratic primary results
Party	Candidate	Votes	%
Democratic	John O'Donnell	659,196	100.0%
Total votes		659,196	100.0%

==== General election ====
===== Results =====
2020 Ohio Supreme Court Associate Justice (Term commencing 01/01/2021) election
Party	Candidate	Votes	%
Nonpartisan	Sharon Kennedy (incumbent)	2,735,041	55.07%
Nonpartisan	John O'Donnell	2,231,724	44.93%
Total votes		4,966,765	100.0%
Republican hold			

=== Associate Justice (Term commencing 01/02/2021) ===
==== Republican primary ====
===== Candidates =====
- Judith French, incumbent Associate Justice of the Supreme Court of Ohio

===== Results =====
Republican primary results
Party	Candidate	Votes	%
Republican	Judith French (incumbent)	618,739	100.0%
Total votes		618,739	100.0%

==== Democratic primary ====
===== Candidates =====
- Jennifer Brunner, incumbent Judge of the Ohio Court of Appeals for the 10th District and former Ohio Secretary of State (2007–2011)

===== Results =====
Democratic primary results
Party	Candidate	Votes	%
Democratic	Jennifer Brunner	675,231	100.0%
Total votes		675,231	100.0%

==== General election ====
2020 Ohio Supreme Court election (French seat)
- November 3, 2020
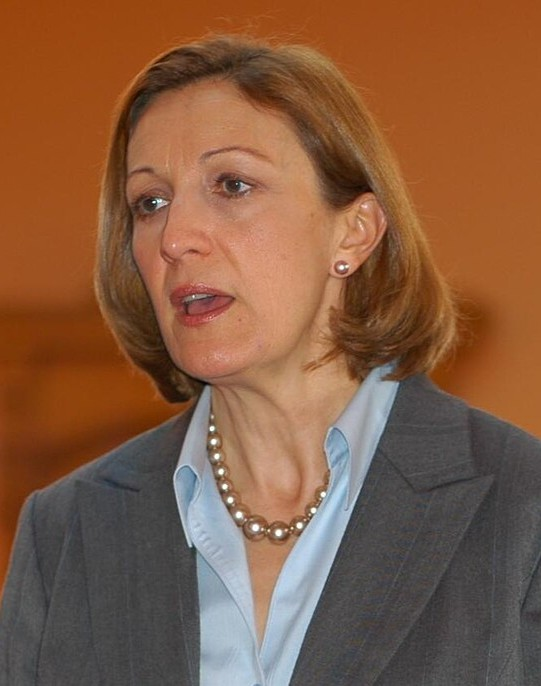

Nominee	Jennifer Brunner	Judith French
Party	Nonpartisan	Nonpartisan
Alliance	Democratic	Republican
Popular vote	2,695,072	2,174,820
Percentage	55.34%	44.66%
- Brunner: 50–60% 60-70% 70–80% French: 50–60% 60–70%
Justice before election
Judith French
Republican
Elected Justice
Jennifer Brunner
Democratic

===== Results =====
2020 Ohio Supreme Court Associate Justice (Term commencing 01/02/2021) election
Party	Candidate	Votes	%
Nonpartisan	Jennifer Brunner	2,695,072	55.34%
Nonpartisan	Judi French (incumbent)	2,174,820	44.66%
Total votes		4,869,892	100.0%
Democratic gain from Republican			

This was the last time that Ohio elected a Democrat for a statewide office until 2026.

== Court of Appeals ==
=== District 1 ===
2020 Ohio Court of Appeals 1st District (Term commencing 02/09/2021) election
- November 3, 2020
Nominee	Ginger Bock	Russell Mock
Party	Nonpartisan	Nonpartisan
Alliance	Democratic	Republican
Popular vote	204,998	160,641
Percentage	56.07%	43.93%
- Precinct results Bock: 50–60% 60–70% 70–80% 80–90% 90%+ Mock: 50–60% 60–70% 70–80% 80–90% Tie: 50%
Justice before election
Russell Mock
Republican
Elected Justice
Ginger Bock
Democratic

==== Term commencing 02/09/2021 ====
2020 Ohio Court of Appeals 1st District (Term commencing 02/09/2021) election
Party	Candidate	Votes	%
Nonpartisan	Ginger Bock	204,998	56.07%
Nonpartisan	Russell J. Mock (incumbent)	160,641	43.93%
Total votes		365,639	100.0%
Democratic gain from Republican			

=== District 2 ===
2020 Ohio Court of Appeals 2nd District (Term commencing 02/09/2021) election
- November 3, 2020
Nominee	Chris Epley	Marshall Lachman
Party	Nonpartisan	Nonpartisan
Alliance	Republican	Democratic
Popular vote	232,026	194,737
Percentage	54.37%	45.63%
- Precinct results Epley: 50–60% 60–70% 70–80% Lachman: 50–60% 60–70% 70–80% 80–90%
Justice before election
Chris Epley
Republican
Elected Justice
Chris Epley
Republican

==== Term commencing 02/09/2021 ====
2020 Ohio Court of Appeals 2nd District (Term commencing 02/09/2021) election
Party	Candidate	Votes	%
Nonpartisan	Chris Epley	232,026	54.37%
Nonpartisan	Marshall G. Lachman	194,737	45.63%
Total votes		426,763	100.0%
Republican gain from Democratic			

=== District 3 ===
==== Term commencing 02/09/2021 ====
2020 Ohio Court of Appeals 3rd District (Term commencing 02/09/2021) election
Party	Candidate	Votes	%
Nonpartisan	Mark C. Miller	286,971	100.0%
Total votes		286,971	100.0%
Republican hold			

=== District 4 ===
==== Term commencing 02/09/2021 ====
2020 Ohio Court of Appeals 4th District (Term commencing 02/09/2021) election
Party	Candidate	Votes	%
Nonpartisan	Peter B. Abele (incumbent)	182,359	100.0%
Total votes		182,359	100.0%
Republican hold			

==== Unexpired term ending 02/08/2023 ====
2020 Ohio Court of Appeals 4th District (Unexpired term ending 02/08/2023) election
Party	Candidate	Votes	%
Nonpartisan	Kristy Wilkin (incumbent)	115,387	52.81%
Nonpartisan	Stacy Brooks	103,115	47.19%
Total votes		218,502	100.0%
Republican hold			

=== District 5 ===
==== Term commencing 02/09/2021 ====
2020 Ohio Court of Appeals 5th District (Term commencing 02/09/2021) election
Party	Candidate	Votes	%
Nonpartisan	William B. Hoffman (incumbent)	361,543	61.36%
Nonpartisan	Jeff Furr	227,675	38.64%
Total votes		589,218	100.0%
Democratic hold			

=== District 6 ===
==== Term commencing 02/09/2021 ====
2020 Ohio Court of Appeals 6th District (Term commencing 02/09/2021) election
Party	Candidate	Votes	%
Nonpartisan	Thomas J. Osowik (incumbent)	283,659	100.0%
Total votes		283,659	100.0%
Democratic hold			

==== Term commencing 02/10/2021 ====
2020 Ohio Court of Appeals 6th District (Term commencing 02/10/2021) election
Party	Candidate	Votes	%
Nonpartisan	Myron C. Duhart	173,244	52.60%
Nonpartisan	Charles Sulek	156,128	47.40%
Total votes		329,372	100.0%
Democratic hold			

=== District 7 ===
==== Term commencing 02/09/2021 ====
2020 Ohio Court of Appeals 7th District (Term commencing 02/09/2021) election
Party	Candidate	Votes	%
Nonpartisan	Carol Ann Robb (incumbent)	180,449	100.0%
Total votes		180,449	100.0%
Republican hold			

==== Term commencing 02/10/2021 ====
2020 Ohio Court of Appeals 7th District (Term commencing 02/10/2021) election
Party	Candidate	Votes	%
Nonpartisan	Cheryl L. Waite (incumbent)	170,104	100.0%
Total votes		170,104	100.0%
Democratic hold			

=== District 8 ===
==== Term commencing 02/09/2021 ====
2020 Ohio Court of Appeals 8th District (Term commencing 02/09/2021) election
Party	Candidate	Votes	%
Nonpartisan	Sean C. Gallagher (incumbent)	356,192	100.0%
Total votes		356,192	100.0%
Democratic hold			

==== Term commencing 02/10/2021 ====
2020 Ohio Court of Appeals 8th District (Term commencing 02/10/2021) election
Party	Candidate	Votes	%
Nonpartisan	Larry A. Jones (incumbent)	341,649	100.0%
Total votes		341,649	100.0%
Democratic hold			

==== Term commencing 02/11/2021 ====
2020 Ohio Court of Appeals 8th District (Term commencing 02/11/2021) election
Party	Candidate	Votes	%
Nonpartisan	Emanuella D. Groves	268,276	57.73%
Nonpartisan	Pamela A. Hawkins	196,405	42.27%
Total votes		464,681	100.0%
Democratic hold			

==== Term commencing 02/12/2021 ====
2020 Ohio Court of Appeals 8th District (Term commencing 02/12/2021) election
Party	Candidate	Votes	%
Nonpartisan	Anita Laster Mays (incumbent)	324,766	100.0%
Total votes		324,766	100.0%
Democratic hold			

==== Unexpired Term ending 01/01/2023 ====
2020 Ohio Court of Appeals 8th District (Unexpired Term ending 01/01/2023) election
Party	Candidate	Votes	%
Nonpartisan	Lisa Forbes	326,112	71.02%
Nonpartisan	Ray Headen (incumbent)	133,072	28.98%
Total votes		459,184	100.0%
Democratic gain from Republican			

=== District 9 ===
==== Term commencing 02/09/2021 ====
2020 Ohio Court of Appeals 9th District (Term commencing 02/09/2021) election
Party	Candidate	Votes	%
Nonpartisan	Betty Sutton	271,875	54.07%
Nonpartisan	Julie A. Schafer (incumbent)	230,938	45.93%
Total votes		502,783	100.0%
Democratic gain from Republican			

=== District 10 ===
==== Term commencing 02/09/2021 ====
2020 Ohio Court of Appeals 10th District (Term commencing 02/09/2021) election
Party	Candidate	Votes	%
Nonpartisan	Michael C. Mentel	270,776	51.51%
Nonpartisan	Colleen O'Donnell	254,900	48.49%
Total votes		525,676	100.0%
Democratic gain from Republican			

==== Term commencing 07/01/2021 ====
2020 Ohio Court of Appeals 10th District (Term commencing 07/01/2021) election
Party	Candidate	Votes	%
Nonpartisan	Terri Jamison	275,213	53.33%
Nonpartisan	Lisa L. Sadler (incumbent)	240,837	46.67%
Total votes		516,050	100.0%
Democratic gain from Republican			

=== District 11 ===
==== Term commencing 02/09/2021 ====
2020 Ohio Court of Appeals 11th District (Term commencing 02/09/2021) election
Party	Candidate	Votes	%
Nonpartisan	Matt Lynch (incumbent)	186,845	55.54%
Nonpartisan	Timothy P. Cannon (incumbent)	149,577	44.46%
Total votes		336,422	100.0%
Republican gain from Democratic			

==== Term commencing 02/10/2021 ====
2020 Ohio Court of Appeals 11th District (Term commencing 02/10/2021) election
Party	Candidate	Votes	%
Nonpartisan	Cynthia Westcott Rice (incumbent)	166,310	51.05%
Nonpartisan	Sarah Thomas Kovoor	159,486	48.95%
Total votes		325,796	100.0%
Democratic hold			

=== District 12 ===
==== Term commencing 01/01/2021 ====
2020 Ohio Court of Appeals 12th District (Term commencing 01/01/2021) election
Party	Candidate	Votes	%
Nonpartisan	Matthew Byrne	350,206	100.0%
Total votes		350,206	100.0%
Republican hold			

==== Term commencing 02/09/2021 ====
2020 Ohio Court of Appeals 12th District (Term commencing 02/09/2021) election
Party	Candidate	Votes	%
Nonpartisan	Robert A. Hendrickson (incumbent)	347,575	100.0%
Total votes		347,575	100.0%
Republican hold			

== See also ==
- Postal voting in the United States, 2020
- Elections in Ohio
- Political party strength in Ohio
