= Philip Rose =

Philip Rose may refer to:

- Sir Philip Rose, 1st Baronet (1816–1883), British lawyer
- Philip Rose (theatrical producer) (1921–2011), Broadway theatrical producer
- Philip H. Rose (born 1946), American politician in the Ohio House of Representatives

== See also ==
- Phil Rose (born 1952), English actor
