= Ohio FirstEnergy bribery scandal =

Ohio political bribery and racketeering scandal tied to House Bill 6 & FirstEnergy

- Date: 2018–present
- Location: Ohio
- Motive: To pass and lobby for a bill that benefited FirstEnergy
- Participants: FirstEnergy; Various Ohio Republican politicians
- Deaths: 2 (suicides of people charged in the case)
- Accused: Neil Clark (deceased); Sam Randazzo (deceased); Chuck Jones; Michael Dowling
- Convicted: Larry Householder; Matt Borges; Jeffrey Longstreth; Juan Cespedes
- Charges: Jones and Dowling: Felony corruption Bribery; Conspiracy; Aggravated theft
- Convictions: Racketeering
- Sentence: Householder: 20 years in prison Borges: 5 years

The Ohio FirstEnergy bribery scandal was a political scandal in Ohio involving a scheme in which electric utility company FirstEnergy funneled roughly $60 million through Generation Now, a 501(c)(4) organization associated with Larry Householder, the Republican Speaker of the Ohio House of Representatives, in connection with efforts to pass and defend House Bill 6 and its $1.3 billion ratepayer-funded bailout and related subsidies.

It was described as "likely the largest bribery, money laundering scheme ever perpetrated against the people of the state of Ohio" by U.S. Attorney David M. DeVillers, who charged Householder and four others with racketeering in July 2020. According to prosecutors, FirstEnergy poured millions into the campaigns of 21 candidates during the 2018 Ohio House of Representatives election, which ultimately helped Householder replace Ryan Smith as Republican House speaker and pass House Bill 6, (Note: 133rd Ohio General Assembly. "House Bill 6".) which increased electricity rates and provided subsidies of approximately $150 million per year for the Perry and Davis–Besse nuclear plants, owned by FirstEnergy.

In 2021, FirstEnergy entered into a deferred prosecution agreement with the U.S. Department of Justice and agreed to pay a $230 million penalty in connection with the bribery scheme. In 2023, Householder was convicted of racketeering conspiracy and sentenced to 20 years in prison. In 2024, FirstEnergy agreed to pay $100 million to settle charges with the U.S. Securities and Exchange Commission related to the bribery scheme. In 2025, the Public Utilities Commission of Ohio ordered FirstEnergy's Ohio utilities to refund $186 million to customers and pay $64 million in civil forfeiture following an investigation tied to the scandal.

== Background ==
Before the enactment of House Bill 6, Ohio's renewable energy and energy efficiency standards were governed by Senate Bill 221 in the 127th General Assembly, which established benchmarks that utilities were required to meet; those standards were later rolled back under House Bill 6.

House Bill 6 was introduced during the 133rd Ohio General Assembly. The bill was sponsored in the Ohio House of Representatives by Jamie Callender. The legislation advanced after the organization of the Ohio House at the start of the General Assembly in January 2019, when Larry Householder was elected Speaker.

The Ohio Senate passed House Bill 6 on July 17, 2019. The Ohio House of Representatives passed the bill on July 23, 2019. Governor Mike DeWine signed the bill into law on July 23, 2019. (Note: 133rd Ohio General Assembly. "House Bill 6".) The bill increased electricity rates, with customers paying an extra $500 million by 2025, and provided that money as a $150 million per year subsidy for the Perry and Davis–Besse nuclear plants, subsidized coal-fired power plants, and reduced subsidies for renewable energy and energy efficiency. Governor Mike DeWine signed the bill the day it passed. This bill was described as the "worst legislation yet" among bills that subsidize fossil fuels by Leah Stokes and the "worst energy bill of the 21st century" by David Roberts of Vox.

Even before the bribery scandal came to light, the financial connections between Larry Householder and FirstEnergy were public knowledge. These ties dated back to the 2016 United States presidential election, with Cleveland restauranteur Tony George, who is also the father of fellow restaurateur Bobby George, serving as the intermediary between Householder and FirstEnergy executives. In addition, Householder and his son flew on a corporate jet owned by FirstEnergy to attend the inauguration of Donald Trump.

Consumer advocates and the natural gas industry tried to place a ballot initiative on the 2020 ballot to overturn the law but were unsuccessful due to negative campaigning by Generation Now.

== Organization of scheme ==
Federal prosecutors alleged that FirstEnergy and related interests used payments routed through Generation Now—a 501(c)(4) nonprofit—as part of a racketeering conspiracy connected to the passage and defense of House Bill 6.

Reporting on the House Bill 6 case described the use of nonprofit and independent-spending mechanisms to finance political advertising and election activity connected to legislative outcomes in Ohio. Analysis published by the Ohio Capital Journal described the case as an example of how untraceable political spending can shape state policymaking.

Investigative reporting during the federal investigation described how former Ohio House Speaker Larry Householder recruited and supported a group of Ohio House candidates who became known as "Team Householder." According to reporting by Cleveland.com, the candidates were encouraged to run for office with the understanding that, if elected, they would support Householder's bid to become Speaker of the Ohio House following the 2018 election.

The Ohio House of Representatives has 99 members, and a majority vote of the full chamber is required to elect a Speaker at the beginning of each General Assembly.

The Cleveland.com investigation identified more than 20 Republican candidates associated with the effort. Several of those candidates benefited from political support in the form of independent expenditures and allied campaign spending during the 2018 Ohio House elections.

Federal prosecutors later alleged that the electoral success of candidates aligned with Householder enabled him to secure the speakership. According to court filings, Householder's control of the Ohio House leadership position allowed House Bill 6 to advance through the legislature.

Court filings and contemporaneous reporting described the recruitment of aligned candidates as part of a broader political strategy tied to Householder's leadership ambitions, emphasizing coordinated electoral outcomes ahead of the speaker selection process rather than traditional legislative caucus-building.

Householder was elected Speaker at the start of the 133rd General Assembly, succeeding Ryan Smith, after receiving a majority of votes in the Ohio House.

=== Team Householder candidates ===
According to contemporaneous reporting by Cleveland.com, former Ohio House Speaker Larry Householder recruited and supported a group of Republican candidates during the 2018 Ohio House of Representatives elections who were collectively referred to as "Team Householder." The report stated that the candidates were encouraged to run for office with the understanding that, if elected, they would support Householder's bid to become speaker of the Ohio House following the election.

Subsequent federal investigations and reporting described how political spending by Householder-aligned groups was used to support these candidates during the 2018 election cycle.

The candidates identified in the report included:

Brian Baldridge, Jamie Callender, Jon Cross, Brett Hillyer, Don Jones, Jena Powell, Tracy Richardson, Bill Roemer, J. Todd Smith, Shane Wilkin

The Cleveland.com report stated that the electoral success of candidates recruited by Householder contributed to his ability to secure enough votes to regain the speakership at the start of the 133rd Ohio General Assembly.

=== Campaign contributions to Ohio House candidates ===
Federal prosecutors stated that Larry Householder exercised control over political spending connected to House Bill 6 through Generation Now and related entities, as described in court records and sentencing filings. The filings also noted that, in addition to independent expenditures described in the federal case, Householder made direct campaign contributions to Ohio House candidates through lawful channels.

Reporting by ABC6 News documented that Householder donated more than $200,000 to Ohio House candidates who later voted in favor of House Bill 6, based on campaign finance records reviewed by the outlet. The report did not allege that the contributions were illegal, but noted their timing in relation to legislative action on the bill.

== How the money flowed ==
Federal court opinions and charging documents describe a scheme in which money originating with FirstEnergy Corp. was routed through nonprofit entities and used for political operations connected to the passage and defense of House Bill 6, including spending to support candidates aligned with Larry Householder and efforts to protect the law after its enactment.

=== Described flow of funds ===
According to the Sixth Circuit, FirstEnergy provided funds that were directed to Generation Now, a 501(c)(4) nonprofit organization. The court opinion states that Generation Now was used to receive and disburse money for political purposes tied to Householder's effort to regain the speakership of the Ohio House of Representatives and to advance House Bill 6 through the legislature.

The charging documents allege that the nonprofit structure allowed the payments to be concealed from public disclosure while being used for election-related spending and issue advocacy connected to the legislation.

In a separate federal indictment announced in 2025, prosecutors alleged that former FirstEnergy executives used an additional 501(c)(4) entity, Energy Pass-Through, to route money connected to the same bribery scheme. That indictment also alleged a related bribery arrangement involving payments to entities associated with Sam Randazzo, the former chair of the Public Utilities Commission of Ohio (PUCO).

The Sixth Circuit concluded that the evidence supported the jury's finding that these funding arrangements constituted a coordinated enterprise exchanging financial support for political action, rather than independent political advocacy.

=== Utility campaign contributions outside the Generation Now scheme ===
In addition to the concealed political spending routed through Generation Now, other Ohio electric utilities made legal, disclosed campaign contributions during the House Bill 6 period and its aftermath.

Reporting by the Energy and Policy Institute documented campaign donations connected to American Electric Power (AEP) to Governor Mike DeWine's reelection campaign after AEP disclosed that it had received a subpoena from the U.S. Securities and Exchange Commission related to potential financial benefits associated with House Bill 6.

According to the same reporting, the AEP political action committee contributed $10,000 to DeWine's campaign on July 26, 2021. In addition, individual AEP executives made personal contributions totaling $15,500 earlier in July 2021, based on Ohio campaign-finance records cited in the report.

Additional campaign finance filings from the Ohio secretary of state show that the DeWine–Husted campaign committee received contributions from multiple energy and utility-affiliated political action committees during the 2018 election cycle. Reported contributions included:

- FirstEnergy Corp PAC — $12,707.79 (campaign) and $10,000 (inaugural)
- NiSource Inc. PAC — $8,500 and $12,500
- Duke Energy PAC — multiple contributions totaling approximately $22,500
- Dominion Energy PAC — multiple contributions totaling approximately $10,000
- American Electric Power PAC — $10,000 (inaugural)

These amounts are reflected in publicly available campaign finance filings maintained by the Ohio Secretary of State.

Separate reporting found that FirstEnergy made a $1 million payment through a dark money group to support Jon Husted's campaign prior to the public emergence of the House Bill 6 scandal.

=== Entities and individuals explicitly named in the cited records ===
The following entities and individuals are explicitly named in the Sixth Circuit opinion and the DOJ charging materials cited above.

==== Corporate and nonprofit entities ====
FirstEnergy Corp., Generation Now [501(c)(4)], Energy Pass-Through [501(c)(4)], American Electric Power (AEP), AEP executives

==== Government bodies involved ====
The House Bill 6 scandal involved multiple government institutions across Ohio's legislative, executive, regulatory, enforcement, and financial oversight systems, reflecting the breadth of public bodies implicated in the passage of the bailout legislation and the subsequent investigations and proceedings.

- Ohio General Assembly

The Ohio General Assembly passed House Bill 6 in 2019, enacting the nuclear power bailout at the center of the scandal. Federal prosecutors alleged that the legislation was secured through a bribery scheme funded by utility money routed through dark-money organizations.

- Ohio House of Representatives

The Ohio House was the primary legislative venue for HB6 and the chamber in which Larry Householder sought and secured the speakership. Prosecutors alleged that dark-money funding was used to elect and maintain a House majority supportive of the bailout legislation.

- Ohio Senate

The Ohio Senate considered and passed House Bill 6 after House approval. Senate action completed the legislative process that enabled the nuclear bailout later linked to the bribery scheme.

- Office of the Governor of Ohio

The executive branch, led by Governor Mike DeWine, was involved in discussions surrounding HB6. Text messages later released showed executive-branch communications with utility representatives during the period leading up to the bill's passage. Neither the governor nor the lieutenant governor was charged in the federal case.

- Office of the Lieutenant Governor of Ohio

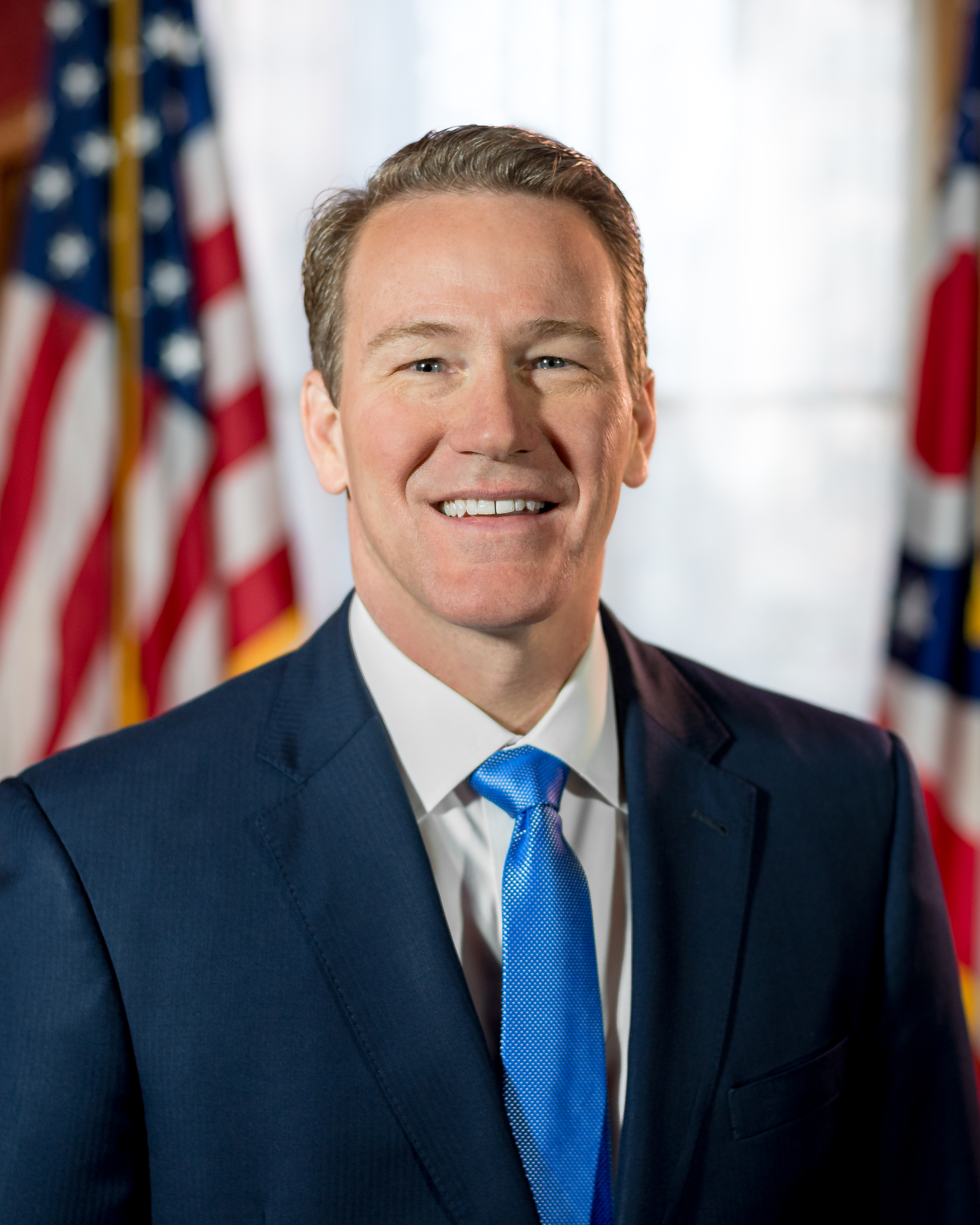
Husted as lieutenant governor in 2018

Jon Husted served as lieutenant governor during the period surrounding the passage of House Bill 6. In 2026, he testified as a defense witness in the criminal trial of former FirstEnergy executives charged in connection with the legislation.

During his testimony, Husted said he attended a 2018 dinner with then-Governor-elect Mike DeWine and the executives but did not recall specific details of the discussion.

Reporting indicated that Husted's official calendar included a scheduled meeting with former Public Utilities Commission of Ohio chair Sam Randazzo shortly before House Bill 6 was introduced, and described communications between Husted, utility representatives, and state officials during the period in which the legislation was being considered.

Reporting in 2024 found that FirstEnergy made a $1 million payment through a dark money group to support Husted's campaign prior to the public emergence of the House Bill 6 scandal, according to documents reviewed by multiple news organizations.

Additional reporting cited text messages and emails in which FirstEnergy officials described Husted as helping to advance House Bill 6.

He has not been accused of wrongdoing in connection with the case.

- Public Utilities Commission of Ohio (PUCO)

PUCO became a central regulatory body in the aftermath of HB6. The commission oversaw proceedings examining utility conduct tied to the bailout and approved settlements connected to the scandal. PUCO hearings were initiated to review regulatory failures and utility behavior following HB6's passage.

- Office of the Ohio Consumers’ Counsel (OCC)

The OCC participated in post-HB6 regulatory proceedings, including filing motions seeking subpoenas related to utility actions connected to the bailout. The office represented ratepayer interests in PUCO cases examining the fallout from the scandal.

- Ohio Attorney General’s Office

The Ohio Attorney General’s Office played a role in the state-level response to the House Bill 6 scandal, including oversight of settlements and enforcement actions separate from the federal criminal case. In 2024, FirstEnergy reached a $20 million settlement with the State of Ohio that included a no-prosecution agreement at the state level, subject to continued cooperation and compliance. The agreement did not affect the federal convictions or prosecutions related to the bribery scheme.

- Ohio Secretary of State

The Ohio Secretary of State’s office served as the repository for campaign-finance disclosures connected to House Bill 6–era political activity. Reporting on utility-linked donations, including contributions from American Electric Power’s political action committee and individual executives to statewide candidates, relied on Ohio campaign-finance records maintained by the Secretary of State. These disclosures formed the basis for later investigative reporting examining legal utility influence alongside the criminal bribery scheme.

- U.S. Securities and Exchange Commission

The U.S. Securities and Exchange Commission became involved through financial oversight of utilities connected to House Bill 6. American Electric Power and FirstEnergy disclosed receiving subpoenas from the SEC related to potential financial benefits associated with the nuclear bailout legislation. These disclosures occurred amid heightened scrutiny of utility political spending and preceded reported campaign contributions and settlements tied to the broader HB6 fallout.

- Ohio Ethics Commission

The Ohio Ethics Commission reviewed aspects of conduct connected to the HB6 scandal as public scrutiny expanded beyond criminal prosecution, although enforcement authority remained limited compared to federal prosecutors.

- United States Department of Justice

The U.S. Department of Justice investigated and prosecuted the HB6 bribery scheme, securing convictions against former Ohio House Speaker Larry Householder and others. The federal case established the core facts underlying the scandal.

- Federal Courts

Federal courts oversaw the criminal proceedings, sentencing, and subsequent appeals related to the HB6 case. Defendants later sought review by the U.S. Supreme Court, arguing that the convictions criminalized protected political activity.

==== Legislative committees involved and related money movement ====
- Ohio House Energy and Natural Resources Committee

HB6 received substantive hearings in this committee during the 133rd General Assembly. While the committee itself did not receive funds, federal prosecutors later established that utility-funded dark money was used to elect and maintain a House majority supportive of the bailout as the bill advanced through committee and floor consideration. Trial evidence showed that FirstEnergy-funded entities supported candidates aligned with then-Speaker Larry Householder, shaping committee leadership and legislative outcomes during the HB6 process.

- House Energy and Natural Resources Subcommittee on Energy Generation

HB6 was reviewed within this subcommittee as part of its progression through the House. Investigative reporting and trial summaries later concluded that dark-money spending by utility interests was directed toward electing lawmakers favorable to the bill, rather than toward the committee itself, allowing HB6 to proceed through subcommittee review without direct financial transactions involving the legislative body.

- House Rules and Reference Committee

The House Rules and Reference Committee controlled HB6's referral and movement within the chamber. According to federal prosecutors, the broader bribery scheme relied on utility-funded political spending to secure a cooperative House leadership structure, enabling bills such as HB6 to be steered through procedural committees as part of the legislative strategy.

- Ohio Senate Energy and Public Utilities Committee

After passage in the House, HB6 was considered by the Senate Energy and Public Utilities Committee. Common Cause Ohio's timeline and trial evidence summaries indicate that the same dark-money network used to influence House elections also supported a legislative environment favorable to HB6 in the Senate, facilitating committee consideration and final passage of the bailout legislation.

==== Individuals ====
Larry Householder, Matthew Borges, Jeffrey Longstreth, Juan Cespedes, Neil Clark, Charles "Chuck" Jones, Michael Dowling, John Kiani, Sam Randazzo.

=== Public records used to trace recipient payments ===
The Sixth Circuit opinion and DOJ charging documents describe the structure and control of the funding but do not provide a comprehensive, itemized list of all downstream vendors or political recipients. Recipient-level detail appears in trial exhibits and government sentencing filings. A publicly available government sentencing memorandum in the federal case references those exhibits and serves as an entry point for further review of payment records used at trial.

== Executive branch involvement ==
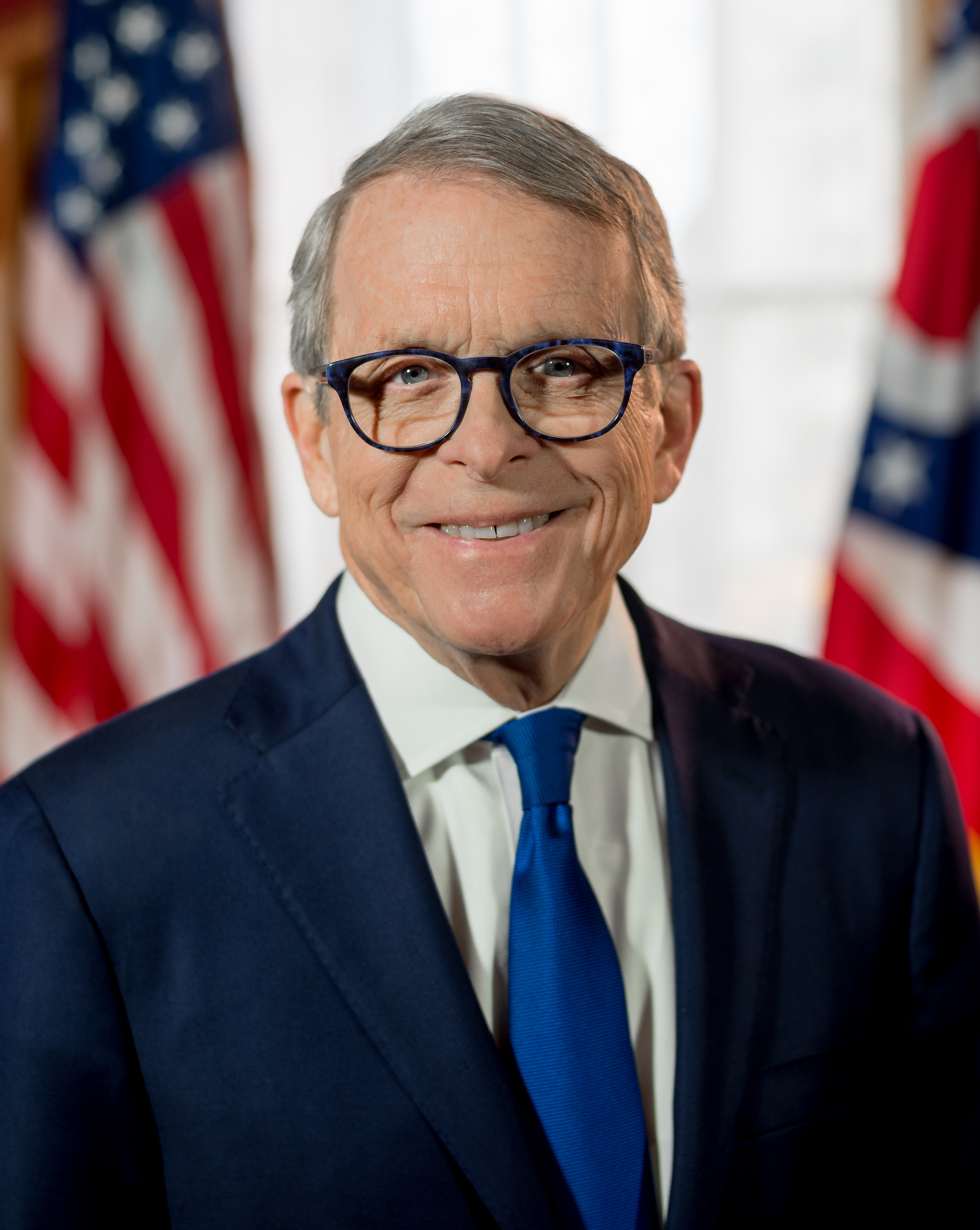
Mike DeWine official portrait, 2018

Reporting during the federal investigation into the Ohio nuclear bribery scandal examined the involvement of Ohio Governor Mike DeWine and Lieutenant Governor Jon Husted in discussions surrounding House Bill 6. Text messages released in 2022 showed that Husted communicated with former FirstEnergy executives and lobbyists during the period leading up to the passage of the nuclear bailout legislation.

Following publication of the text messages, DeWine and Husted acknowledged participating in discussions about House Bill 6 but denied knowledge of the bribery scheme described by federal prosecutors. Neither was charged in the case.

Subsequent reporting based on documents and testimony indicated that Husted attended a 2018 dinner with energy executives and that his official calendar included a scheduled meeting with former Public Utilities Commission of Ohio chair Sam Randazzo shortly before House Bill 6 was introduced. Reporting also described communications between Husted, utility representatives, and state officials during the period in which the legislation was being considered.

Reporting in 2024 found that FirstEnergy made a $1 million payment through a dark money group to support Husted’s campaign prior to the public emergence of the scandal, according to documents reviewed by multiple news organizations.

Reporting in 2024 examined dark money spending connected to Governor Mike DeWine’s 2018 campaign. Documents reviewed by news organizations indicated that FirstEnergy provided approximately $2.5 million to a nonprofit affiliated with the Republican Governors Association that supported DeWine’s candidacy. Additional reporting described text messages in which a $500,000 contribution was discussed following instructions to “call Mike DeWine,” according to records reviewed during the investigation. DeWine has said he was not aware of the source of certain political spending and has denied knowledge of the bribery scheme. He has not been charged in connection with the case.

In 2026, Husted testified as a defense witness in the criminal trial of former FirstEnergy executives charged in connection with House Bill 6. He stated that he did not recall specific details of discussions with the executives.

The executive branch communications and campaign-finance activity occurred as regulators and lawmakers reviewed the implementation of House Bill 6 and its connection to the broader corruption case.

== Post-enactment defense of House Bill 6 ==
Federal charging documents and appellate findings described the House Bill 6 scheme as extending beyond passage of the legislation to include efforts to defend the law after it was enacted. The United States Court of Appeals for the Sixth Circuit found that the charged defendants used political spending routed through nonprofit entities not only to secure legislative approval of House Bill 6, but also to protect the statute from repeal and political challenge once it became law.

Investigative reporting during the federal case described how Householder's political operation remained active after House Bill 6 was signed, with aligned lawmakers and political allies continuing to support Householder’s leadership and the law itself while repeal efforts emerged.

The Sixth Circuit held that these post-enactment activities were part of the same racketeering enterprise alleged by prosecutors, rejecting arguments that the conduct ended once House Bill 6 was passed and emphasizing that the conspiracy included efforts to maintain political power and preserve the benefits of the legislation.

=== After the scheme was exposed ===
After the federal indictment of former Ohio House Speaker Larry Householder, the Ohio General Assembly did not immediately move to fully repeal House Bill 6. Reporting documented that legislative activity surrounding the law slowed significantly following the public exposure of the bribery scheme, even as federal proceedings advanced and public scrutiny intensified.

Investigative reporting described how Ohio House leadership retained procedural control over committee schedules and floor consideration, allowing repeal proposals to stall without recorded votes. Coverage by the Ohio Capital Journal noted that repeal legislation was introduced during multiple sessions but did not receive hearings or advance through the legislative process, leaving major provisions of House Bill 6 in effect well after the bribery allegations became public.

Contemporaneous reporting on Householder's political operation showed that many legislators who had supported House Bill 6 or aligned with Householder's leadership effort remained in office and continued to participate in legislative decision-making after the indictment, despite the absence of public explanations regarding their positions on the law’s future.

When the Ohio House ultimately voted to expel Householder, the vote addressed his membership in the chamber but did not result in immediate legislative action to repeal House Bill 6. Reporting on the expulsion vote showed that several legislators voted against expulsion or took no public position on repeal at that time, while the statute itself remained in force.

Together, this period was characterized by limited legislative action and prolonged durability of House Bill 6, despite criminal proceedings that established the existence of a bribery scheme tied to its passage.

=== Repeal and amendment efforts ===
In 2020, following the exposure of the bribery scheme, lawmakers introduced Senate Bill 346, sponsored by Senators Mark Romanchuk (R) and Hearcel Craig (D) and cosponsored by Senators Kristina Roegner, Nickie Antonio (D), Cecil Thomas (D), and Sean O'Brien (D), which proposed repealing House Bill 6 and restoring Ohio’s prior energy law. The bill did not advance to enactment.

In 2021, the Ohio General Assembly passed House Bill 128, sponsored by Representatives James M. Hoops and Dick Stein, which repealed the nuclear generation subsidy created by House Bill 6. The legislation did not repeal other provisions of House Bill 6, including the state-mandated charge used to subsidize two Ohio Valley Electric Corporation (OVEC) coal-fired power plants.

Subsequent repeal efforts focused on remaining House Bill 6 provisions, particularly the "legacy generation resource" charge that funded OVEC coal plants. Senate Bill 117 was introduced in the Ohio Legislature with primary sponsors Mark Romanchuk and Hearcel Craig; the bill sought to repeal the legacy generation charges but did not eliminate the coal subsidy charge.

In 2025, the General Assembly enacted House Bill 15, sponsored in the House by Roy Klopfenstein, which ended the OVEC coal-plant subsidy charge created by House Bill 6; reporting noted that the bill repealed the final major ratepayer-funded subsidy established under House Bill 6, while other regulatory and policy changes enacted by House Bill 6 remained in effect.

Taken together, these actions repealed specific subsidy provisions enacted under House Bill 6 but did not fully repeal the law; other structural and regulatory changes enacted by House Bill 6 remain in force.

=== Actions by House Speaker Jason Stephens ===
Reporting by the Ohio Capital Journal described how proposals to repeal House Bill 6 did not advance in the Ohio House during the speakership of Jason Stephens. According to the outlet, repeal legislation was introduced but did not receive committee hearings or reach the House floor for a vote.

The report stated that House leadership controls whether legislation is scheduled for hearings or floor consideration, and that comprehensive repeal measures did not proceed during that period. As a result, the outlet reported that portions of House Bill 6 remained in effect in subsequent legislative sessions.

== Expulsion of Larry Householder ==
After federal charges were filed against Ohio House Speaker Larry Householder in connection with House Bill 6, the Ohio House of Representatives did not immediately vote on whether to expel him. Reporting by the Ohio Capital Journal stated that House leadership did not bring an expulsion resolution forward for several months following the indictment. The outlet reported that House leaders discussed internal caucus considerations and the absence of a prior conviction when addressing the timing of a potential expulsion vote.

On June 16, 2021, the Ohio House of Representatives voted to expel Householder. The resolution passed with broad support, though a minority of members voted against expulsion. The Dayton Daily News reported the roll-call vote on the expulsion resolution.

== Public-records disputes related to House Bill 6 ==
In March 2022, the Ohio Capital Journal reported that attorneys for the Ohio House of Representatives denied a public-records request seeking text messages between State Representative Jay Edwards and former House Speaker Larry Householder. According to the report, House counsel stated that no responsive records could be located. Edwards told the outlet that he deletes text messages as a general practice, while also stating that he would not delete any messages he believed to be public records. The article further described the Ohio House records-retention policy cited in the denial as classifying text messages as “transient records” that may be disposed of under the schedule outlined in that policy.

In 2025, the Ohio Supreme Court issued a decision that was reported as limiting access to certain communications conducted through private accounts. Coverage of the ruling stated that the court held a public official's private messages are not subject to Ohio's public-records law when such communications are not "kept" by a public office under the statutory definition applied in the case.

== Appeals and related litigation ==
In 2025, the U.S. Court of Appeals for the Sixth Circuit rejected efforts by former Ohio House Speaker Larry Householder and co-defendants to overturn their federal racketeering convictions connected to the House Bill 6 bribery scheme. The court upheld the convictions, finding that the evidence supported the jury’s conclusion that Householder and others participated in a coordinated enterprise that exchanged political power for financial support, and that the conduct fell squarely within the scope of federal racketeering and bribery law.

Separately, Householder sought dismissal of remaining state-level charges in Ohio, arguing that they were barred or otherwise invalid following the federal prosecution. In 2025, a Cuyahoga County judge denied the motion to dismiss, allowing the Ohio Attorney General’s case to proceed. State prosecutors argued that the charges addressed distinct violations of Ohio law arising from the same bribery scheme and were not precluded by the federal convictions.

== Reactions ==
Governor Mike DeWine asked Householder to resign, as did former Governor John Kasich, who previously opposed H.B. 6, but Householder refused. Republican legislator Jamie Callender, who had sponsored the bill, claimed no knowledge of the scheme and said that he felt "betrayed".

Democratic U.S. Senator Sherrod Brown also joined the prominent voices calling for Householder's resignation and additionally blamed the scandal on Republican one-party rule in Ohio state politics.

DeWine had earlier resisted calls to repeal H.B. 6, but changed his mind on July 23, stating: "No matter how good this policy is, the process by which this bill was passed is simply not acceptable. That process, I believe, has forever tainted the bill and now the law itself." DeWine urged the House to quickly select a new speaker in order to pass a replacement bill.

The scandal, which occurred during a presidential election campaign, led to speculation about whether it could lead Joe Biden to win the state in the 2020 presidential election. Biden ultimately lost Ohio to Donald Trump by 53.3% to 45.2%.

== Aftermath and long-term impact ==
On June 16, 2021, the Ohio House of Representatives voted to expel former Speaker Larry Householder from the chamber. The seat representing the 72nd House District was later filled by Kevin D. Miller, a former State Highway Patrolman.

On July 22, 2021, federal prosecutors announced that FirstEnergy would pay a $230 million penalty in connection with the bribery scheme. During the investigation, U.S. Attorney David M. DeVillers described the case as "likely the largest bribery, money laundering scheme ever perpetrated against the people of the state of Ohio."

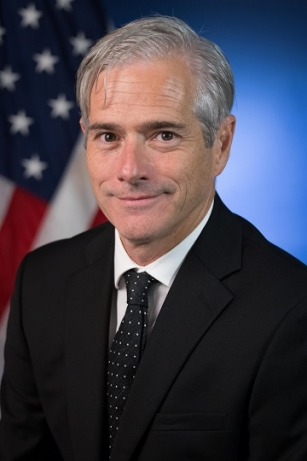
U.S. Attorney David M. DeVillers

On December 30, 2022, FirstEnergy agreed to pay a civil penalty of $3,860,000 to the United States Treasury.

In March 2023, Householder was convicted of racketeering conspiracy and later that year sentenced to 20 years in prison.

The Cleveland Browns announced on April 13, 2023, that the team and FirstEnergy had agreed to terminate the naming rights deal for the Browns' stadium, restoring the name Cleveland Browns Stadium.

Sam Randazzo, the former chair of the Public Utilities Commission of Ohio, died by suicide on April 9, 2024, while awaiting trial on state and federal charges related to the scandal.

In 2024, FirstEnergy paid the U.S. Securities and Exchange Commission $100 million to settle charges related to the bribery scheme.

In 2026, the criminal trial of former FirstEnergy executives Chuck Jones and Michael Dowling ended in a mistrial after the jury was unable to reach a unanimous verdict on the remaining charges. Prior to deliberations, the presiding judge dismissed money-laundering counts against the defendants. State prosecutors indicated that they intend to retry the case.

Campaign finance filings from the Ohio Secretary of State show that Dave Yost received contributions from multiple energy and utility-affiliated political action committees during the 2018 election cycle. Disclosed contributions included $14,500 from American Electric Power PAC, $5,000 from NiSource Inc. PAC, $2,500 from Duke Energy PAC, $2,500 from Marathon Petroleum PAC, $1,000 from BP PAC, $4,000 from the Oil and Gas Producers Fund, and $5,000 from One Energy Ohio PAC, based on publicly available campaign finance records.

In 2025, HBO released a two-part documentary about the scandal titled "The Dark Money Game".

Following the exposure of the scandal, Ohio lawmakers pursued multiple legislative responses but did not fully repeal House Bill 6. In 2020, Senate Bill 346 proposed repealing the law but did not advance.

In 2021, the General Assembly passed House Bill 128, which repealed the nuclear generation subsidy benefiting the Perry and Davis–Besse plants while leaving other provisions, including support for Ohio Valley Electric Corporation (OVEC) coal-fired power plants, in place.

Senate Bill 117 made additional changes to charges associated with House Bill 6 but did not remove all ratepayer-funded subsidies established by the law.

In 2025, lawmakers enacted House Bill 15, which ended the OVEC coal-plant subsidy charge created under House Bill 6.

As a result, while major subsidy provisions tied to the scandal were eventually repealed, House Bill 6 was not fully overturned, and other structural and regulatory changes enacted by the law remain in effect.

Investigations found that Ohio ratepayers were subject to improper charges and billing errors connected to House Bill 6. The Public Utilities Commission of Ohio later ordered refunds and penalties requiring FirstEnergy’s Ohio utilities to return overcharges to customers and pay additional civil forfeitures.

== Institutional and regulatory failures ==
Investigative reporting and advocacy analysis described the House Bill 6 bribery scandal as the result of overlapping institutional failures across Ohio’s legislative, regulatory, and campaign-finance systems. A post-scandal timeline compiled by Common Cause Ohio documented how weak disclosure requirements for 501(c)(4) organizations allowed large sums of money to be routed through nonprofit entities without public transparency, obscuring the source and purpose of political spending tied to the legislation.

Reporting by the Ohio Capital Journal described how Ohio House leadership retained broad procedural control over committee hearings and floor votes, enabling repeal efforts to stall even after the bribery scheme became public. The outlet noted that proposed repeal legislation failed to advance through committees during multiple sessions, leaving key provisions of House Bill 6 in effect for years after federal charges were filed.

The Public Utilities Commission of Ohio was also scrutinized for its oversight role. Subsequent investigations revealed that regulatory decisions and internal controls at the commission failed to prevent improper utility billing practices linked to the legislation, contributing to prolonged overcharges before refunds were ordered.

Together, these findings were cited as evidence that the scandal was not solely the result of individual misconduct, but of systemic gaps in campaign finance transparency, legislative process controls, and regulatory oversight that allowed the scheme to persist undetected and uncorrected for several years.
