= Candice Keller =

American politician

Member of the Ohio House of Representatives from the 53rd district
- In office November 16, 2016 – December 31, 2020
- Preceded by: Tim Derickson
- Succeeded by: Thomas Hall

Personal details
- Born: c. 1959 (age 66–67) Butler County, Ohio, U.S.
- Party: Republican
- Spouse: Kent Keller
- Children: 2
- Education: Miami University (A.A.)
- Website: Official website

Candice Keller (born c. 1959) is a former American politician and former state representative for the 53rd District of the Ohio House of Representatives, which includes part of Butler County. A Republican, in 2019, she proposed legislation to ban and criminalize abortion in Ohio.

== Early life and career ==
Keller was born and raised in Butler County, Ohio. She has been a director of a young mother assistance organization in southwestern Ohio, the Community Pregnancy Center, since 2008. She is also a member of the Central Committee of the local Republican Party.

== Ohio House of Representatives ==
In 2016, Ohio Representative Tim Derickson was unable to run for a fifth term in the Ohio House of Representatives due to term limits. Keller was one of two Republicans to run to replace Derickson; she won the primary 59% to 41%. She won the general election with 65% of the vote over Democrat Susan Rubin. With Derickson leaving his term early to join the administration of Ohio Governor John Kasich, Keller was appointed to fill the rest of his term by starting on November 16, 2016, as opposed to the usual start date of January 1, 2017.

Citing her opposition to vaccine mandates, in April 2021, WOUB-FM radio called Keller a "far-right Republican"

=== 2019 Dayton shooting controversy ===
Following a mass shooting in Dayton, Ohio, in August 2019, Keller posted an essay on her personal Facebook page blaming the shooting on the breakdown of the traditional family (including due to transgender rights, gay marriage and "drag queen advocates"), video game violence, recreational marijuana, open borders, disrespect of military veterans and law enforcement, failed school policies, former President Barack Obama, and "snowflakes, who can’t accept a duly-elected President". She later deleted the post.

As a result, many local officials (including Jane Timken, chairwoman of the Republican Party of Ohio) have called for Keller to resign. Keller, who was then running to replace fellow Republican Bill Coley in the state senate, declined to do so, criticizing "Establishment moderates" and describing herself as the "only conservative in this race." In 2020, she lost the Republican primary.

=== Abortion bill ===
In 2019, Keller and fellow Republican state Representative Ron Hood sponsored legislation that would ban abortion in Ohio and criminalize what they called "abortion murder". Doctors who provided abortion care to women with an ectopic pregnancy and other life-threatening conditions would be exempt from prosecution only if they "[took] all possible steps to preserve the life of the unborn child, while preserving the life of the woman. Such steps include, if applicable, attempting to reimplant an ectopic pregnancy into the woman's uterus". Reimplantation of an ectopic pregnancy is not a recognized or medically feasible procedure.

=== Anti-vaccine efforts and position on COVID-19 and DeWine impeachment ===
Keller has made misleading statements about vaccines. In August 2020, during the COVID-19 pandemic, Keller, along with fellow Republicans John Becker, Nino Vitale, and Paul Zeltwanger, sponsored articles of impeachment against Mike DeWine, Ohio's Republican governor, over his efforts to stop the spread of COVID-19 in Ohio. The long-shot move was panned on both sides of the aisle. Ohio Republican Party Chair Jane Timken criticized the move as "a baseless, feeble attempt" by the sponsors to draw "attention for themselves"; the Republican speaker of the Ohio state House, Bob Cupp, called it an "imprudent attempt" to cause "a state constitutional crisis". Legal scholar Jonathan Entin criticized the proposal to remove DeWine as reflective of a warped understanding of the concept of impeachment. CNN commentator Chris Cillizza said the effort was one of several examples of how Donald Trump had politicized public health matters to the point Republican lawmakers felt they needed to make extreme and pointless moves in order to satisfy the base. DeWine responded by recommending his foes visit a hospital and talk to nurses.

== Personal life ==
According to an April 2019 archive of Keller's campaign website, she has been married for more than 40 years to Kent Keller, a retired software company project manager, with two sons. She resides in Middletown, Ohio.

Political offices
Preceded by Tim Derickson	Ohio House of Representatives, 53rd District; 2016–2020	Succeeded by Thomas Hall
