= Brigid Kelly =

American politician (1983–2024)

Member of the Ohio House of Representatives from the 31st district
- In office January 3, 2017 – December 2022
- Preceded by: Denise Driehaus

Hamilton County Auditor
- In office March 2023 – March 26, 2024

Personal details
- Born: April 21, 1983
- Died: March 26, 2024 (aged 40)
- Party: Democratic
- Spouse: Steve Culter
- Education: Xavier University (BS); University of Cincinnati (MA)

Brigid Kelly (also Brigid Kelly Culter; April 21, 1983 – March 26, 2024) was an American Democratic Party politician who served in the Ohio House of Representatives from 2017 to 2022, representing the 31st District, which consisted of a portion of Cincinnati as well as Norwood, Amberley, Fairfax, Silverton, St. Bernard and a portion of Columbia Township in Hamilton County. She served as the Hamilton County Auditor from March 2023 until her death.

== Life and early career ==
Kelly was born on April 21, 1983. She was raised in Norwood, Ohio, and attended Saint Ursula Academy before graduating from Xavier University with a bachelor's degree and the University of Cincinnati with a master's degree. She had three brothers. Her brother Nicholas died before her. She was married to Steve Culter. A member of a union household, Kelly started working for the United Food and Commercial Workers Union in 2006. She was an organizer for more than a decade and became a communications director for the union.

Prior to being elected to state office, Kelly won a seat on the Norwood City Council in 2006 shortly after she graduated from college. Her grandfather was the mayor of Norwood in the 1950s and her father was a long-time elected official in Norwood.

Kelly was diagnosed with esophageal cancer in 2022, and died from the illness on March 26, 2024, at the age of 40.

== Ohio House of Representatives ==
In 2016, Representative Denise Driehaus was ineligible to run for a fifth term due to term limits, and instead waged a successful bid for Hamilton County Commissioner. Kelly had long been planning to succeed Driehaus, and indeed did announce her campaign for the Democratic nomination. A safely Democratic seat, the primary was crowded, with six people running. However, Kelly won with a plurality of nearly 35%.

Kelly won the general election against Republican Mary E. Yeager with 68% of the vote to take the seat.

Kelly served in the Ohio House of Representatives from 2017 to 2022. While she was in the House, she led a bipartisan effort to pass a bill that would eliminate a sales tax on tampons and other feminine hygiene products in Ohio. She was a primary sponsor of a bill that passed 84–1 in the House in December 2018. The bill passed in the Ohio Senate in October 2019 and went into effect on April 1, 2020. She became the House minority whip, but she lost her role in early 2019 when she refused to support Republican Larry Householder's bid to become Speaker of the Ohio House of Representatives after Democrats made a deal to support Householder.

== Hamilton County Auditor ==
Kelly won the election for Hamilton County Auditor in November 2022 with 53% of the vote. She battled esophageal cancer throughout her tenure as Hamilton County Auditor from March 2023 to March 2024. On March 21, 2024, she announced her resignation due to her declining health. The resignation would have gone into effect on March 27, but she died the day prior.

== Legacy ==
Following her death, friends and family established The Brigid Kelly Public Service Scholarship at Xavier University. The scholarship supports students who demonstrate promise as a future public leader based on their academic record and history of campus and community engagement. Giving to this scholarship helps to ensure that Brigid’s legacy lives on by developing a new generation of leaders who share her commitment to service and community.

Political offices
Preceded by Denise Driehaus	Ohio House of Representatives, 31st District; 2017–2022	Succeeded by
