= Paul Zeltwanger =

American politician (born 1966)

Member of the Ohio House of Representatives from the 54th district
- In office January 5, 2015 – December 31, 2022
- Preceded by: Peter Beck
- Succeeded by: Adam Mathews (redistricting)

Personal details
- Born: March 28, 1966 (age 60)
- Party: Republican
- Education: Grace College & Seminary (BS); Indiana University (MBA)

Paul Zeltwanger (born March 28, 1966) is an American accountant and politician who was a member of the Ohio House of Representatives from the 54th district. Zeltwanger succeeded Peter Beck, who was facing dozens of felony charges. He won the primary with 51% of the vote, and won the general election with 72% of the vote. Zeltwanger works as a real-estate developer. He is also a certified public accountant.

He retired due to term limits in 2022.

== Association with Team Householder ==
During the 2018 Ohio House election cycle, Paul Zeltwanger was identified in reporting as one of the Republican candidates recruited by then-State Representative Larry Householder as part of an organized effort to regain the speakership of the Ohio House of Representatives. According to an investigation by Cleveland.com, Householder assembled a slate of candidates, commonly referred to as “Team Householder,” who were encouraged to run for office with the expectation that they would support his bid for Speaker if elected. Schmidt was listed among the candidates recruited as part of this strategy.

The successful election of multiple Team Householder candidates enabled Householder to secure enough internal support to be elected Speaker at the start of the 133rd Ohio General Assembly.

=== Vote on the Expulsion of Larry Householder ===
During the 134th Ohio General Assembly, Paul Zeltwanger voted against the expulsion of former House Speaker Larry Householder, who had been federally indicted and later convicted in connection with the Ohio nuclear bribery scandal tied to House Bill 6. The Ohio House voted 75–21 to expel Householder, with Paul Zeltwanger among the 21 Republican members who opposed the resolution.

== Career ==
=== Abortion rights ===
In 2019, Zeltwanger co-sponsored legislation that would ban abortion in Ohio and criminalize what they called "abortion murder". Doctors who performed abortions in cases of ectopic pregnancy and other life-threatening conditions would be exempt from prosecution only if they "[took] all possible steps to preserve the life of the unborn child, while preserving the life of the woman. Such steps include, if applicable, attempting to reimplant an ectopic pregnancy into the woman's uterus". Reimplantation of an ectopic pregnancy is not a recognized or medically feasible procedure.

=== COVID-19 and impeachment ===
In August 2020, during the coronavirus pandemic, he joined John Becker, Candice Keller, and Nino Vitale in sponsoring a move to impeach against Mike DeWine, Ohio's Republican governor. The move was widely and immediately panned on both sides of the aisle and by legal scholars and commentators. Ohio Republican Party Chair Jane Timken "issued a scathing condemnation of the trio of conservatives", calling the move “a baseless, feeble attempt at creating attention for themselves.” Ohio House Speaker, Republican Bob Cupp, called it an "imprudent attempt" to cause "a state constitutional crisis". Legal scholar Jonathan Entin said the proposal "means that we’ve distorted our understanding both of what impeachment is supposed to do and how people – especially, elected officials – are supposed to disagree with each other. Do we really want to say that the government can’t act in an emergency because the officials are afraid that if they do anything, they’ll be removed from office? Of course, if they don’t do anything, maybe the response is going to be ‘Well you should be impeached for not acting.'" CNN's Chris Cillizza analyzed it as one of several examples of how Donald Trump had politicized public health matters to the point Republican lawmakers felt they needed to make extreme and pointless moves in order to satisfy the base. DeWine responded by recommending his foes visit a hospital and talk to nurses.
