= Nino Vitale =

American politician

Member of the Ohio House of Representatives from the 85th district
- In office January 6, 2015 – December 31, 2022
- Preceded by: John Adams
- Succeeded by: Tim Barhorst

Personal details
- Born: August 24, 1970 (age 56) Cleveland, Ohio, U.S.
- Party: Republican
- Spouse: Lilli Vitale
- Children: 6
- Education: Ohio State University (BD); Franklin University (MBA)
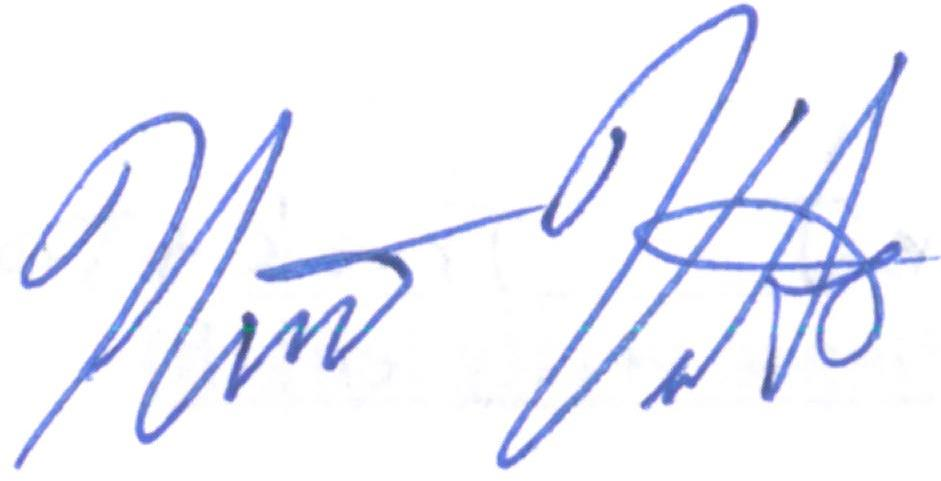
- Signature

A. Nino Vitale (born August 24, 1970) is an American politician who served in the Ohio House of Representatives from the 85th House district from 2015 to 2022.

== Early life ==
Nino Vitale was born on August 24, 1970, in Cleveland, Ohio. He graduated from Ohio State University with a Bachelor's degree, where he was a member of the Ohio State University Marching Band for four years. He later attended Franklin University where he graduated with a Master of Business Administration. In 1998, he married and currently has six children.

== Ohio House of Representatives ==
=== Vote on expulsion of Larry Householder ===
During the 134th Ohio General Assembly, Nino Vitale voted against the expulsion of former Ohio House Speaker Larry Householder. At the time of the vote, Householder had been federally indicted in connection with the Ohio nuclear bribery scandal, which centered on the passage of House Bill 6. The Ohio House of Representatives voted 75–21 to expel Householder, with Nino Vitale among the 21 Republican members who opposed the resolution.

=== Elections ===
In 2014, incumbent Representative John Adams, who represented the 85th district in the state House of Representatives, was unable to run for reelection due to term limits. Vitale won the Republican primary and won in the general election with no opposition.

In 2016, the Ohio House Republican Organizational Caucus did not endorse him, along with Paul Zeltwanger and Wes Retherford, as he would not participate in the activities of the committee. In the general election he faced no opposition. In 2018, he defeated Democratic nominee Garrett Baldwin, a high school senior, with over seventy percent of the popular vote.

In December 2020 and April 2021, the Ohio Elections Commission found him guilty on three out of six counts of campaign finance fraud.

=== Tenure ===
In 2015, he voted against the proposed state budget as it included expanded Medicaid from the Patient Protection and Affordable Care Act. After Obergefell v. Hodges, Vitale proposed a religious freedom bill to allow religious officials to not perform same-sex marriages. In 2016, he voted against a bill making cockfighting a felony offense.

In 2019, Vitale co-sponsored legislation that would ban abortion in Ohio and criminalize what they called "abortion murder". Doctors who performed abortions in cases of ectopic pregnancy and other life-threatening conditions would be exempt from prosecution only if they "[took] all possible steps to preserve the life of the unborn child, while preserving the life of the woman. Such steps include, if applicable, attempting to reimplant an ectopic pregnancy into the woman's uterus". Reimplantation of an ectopic pregnancy is not a recognized or medically feasible procedure.

In 2020, resolutions to declare racism a public health crisis were submitted in the state House and Senate. On June 2, 2020, Vitale stated that he was darker than most of the members of the Ohio Legislative Black Caucus.

He was chairman of the Energy and Natural Resources Committee while he served in the Ohio Legislature. After being subject to term limits in 2022 and thus unable to run for a fifth term, he ran for county commissioner and defeated local farmer and auctioneer Todd Woodruff in a very close race, winning 50.90% of the vote to Woodruff’s 49.10%.

== COVID-19 and impeachment ==
During the COVID-19 pandemic, Vitale refused to wear a mask, as recommended by various health agencies and Ohio governor Mike DeWine, citing his religious beliefs.

"This is the greatest nation on earth founded on Judeo-Christian Principles. One of those principles is that we are all created in the image and likeness of God. That image is seen the most by our face. I will not wear a mask,”

He further criticized DeWine and Ohio Department of Health Director, Amy Acton, on Twitter, stating that the push for masks was a result of fear and propaganda, calling Acton an "unelected globalist", for which he received criticism for using an anti-Semitic slur.

Vitale previously drew controversy after appearing several times in interviews with an anti-vaccination group, Ohio Advocates for Medical Freedom, where he claimed one of his children had a vaccine injury.

On June 25, 2020, Vitale posted a debunked video recording on YouTube to demonstrate the negative effects of wearing masks. In the video, Vitale showed three young people placing an industry-grade gas detection unit under their masks and in front of their noses and mouths as they breathe. Vitale stated that the alarm triggered by placing the unit inside the masks indicates a decline in oxygenation and that the subsequent measurement on the unit's screen falls below the OSHA threshold for acceptable oxygenation.

In July, he urged his constituents not to get tested for Coronavirus.

In August 2020, during the coronavirus pandemic, he joined John Becker, Candice Keller, and Paul Zeltwanger in sponsoring a move to impeach Mike DeWine, Ohio's Republican governor. The move was widely and immediately panned on both sides of the aisle and by legal scholars and commentators. Ohio Republican Party Chair Jane Timken "issued a scathing condemnation of the trio of conservatives", calling the move “a baseless, feeble attempt at creating attention for themselves.” Ohio House Speaker, Republican Bob Cupp, called it an "imprudent attempt" to cause "a state constitutional crisis". Legal scholar Jonathan Entin said the proposal "means that we’ve distorted our understanding both of what impeachment is supposed to do and how people – especially, elected officials – are supposed to disagree with each other. Do we really want to say that the government can't act in an emergency because the officials are afraid that if they do anything, they'll be removed from office? Of course, if they don't do anything, maybe the response is going to be ‘Well you should be impeached for not acting.'" CNN's Chris Cillizza analyzed it as one of several examples of how Donald Trump had politicized public health matters to the point Republican lawmakers felt they needed to make extreme and pointless moves in order to satisfy the base. DeWine responded by recommending his foes visit a hospital and talk to nurses.

Vitale is employed by his wife's family business, Johnson Welded Products. This company received between $2–5M from the federal government as part of the Payroll Protection Program.

== Electoral history ==
Nino Vitale electoral history

2014 Ohio 85th House of Representatives election
Primary election
Party	Candidate	Votes	%
Republican	Nino Vitale	7,098	54.34%
Republican	C. Douglas Chamberlain	4,457	34.12%
Republican	Robert Luckey III	1,508	11.54%
Total votes		13,063	100.00%
General election
Republican	Nino Vitale	23,704	100.00%
Total votes		13,063	100.00%

2016 Ohio 85th House of Representatives election
Party	Candidate	Votes	%
Republican	Nino Vitale (incumbent)	37,416	100.00%
Total votes		37,416	100.00%

2018 Ohio 85th House of Representatives election
Primary election
Party	Candidate	Votes	%
Republican	Nino Vitale (incumbent)	8,817	70.52%
Republican	Justin G. Griffis	1,364	10.91%
Republican	Joe Ratermann	1,240	9.92%
Republican	Rochiel V. Foulk	1,082	8.65%
Total votes		12,503	100.00%
General election
Republican	Nino Vitale (incumbent)	28,608	72.81%
Democratic	Garrett Baldwin	10,681	27.19%
Total votes		39,289	100.00%

2020 Ohio 85th House of Representatives election
Party	Candidate	Votes	%
Republican	Nino Vitale (incumbent)	40,825	91.21%
Independent	Ted Greek (write-in)	3,933	9.79%
Total votes		44,758	100.00%
