= Denise Driehaus =

American politician

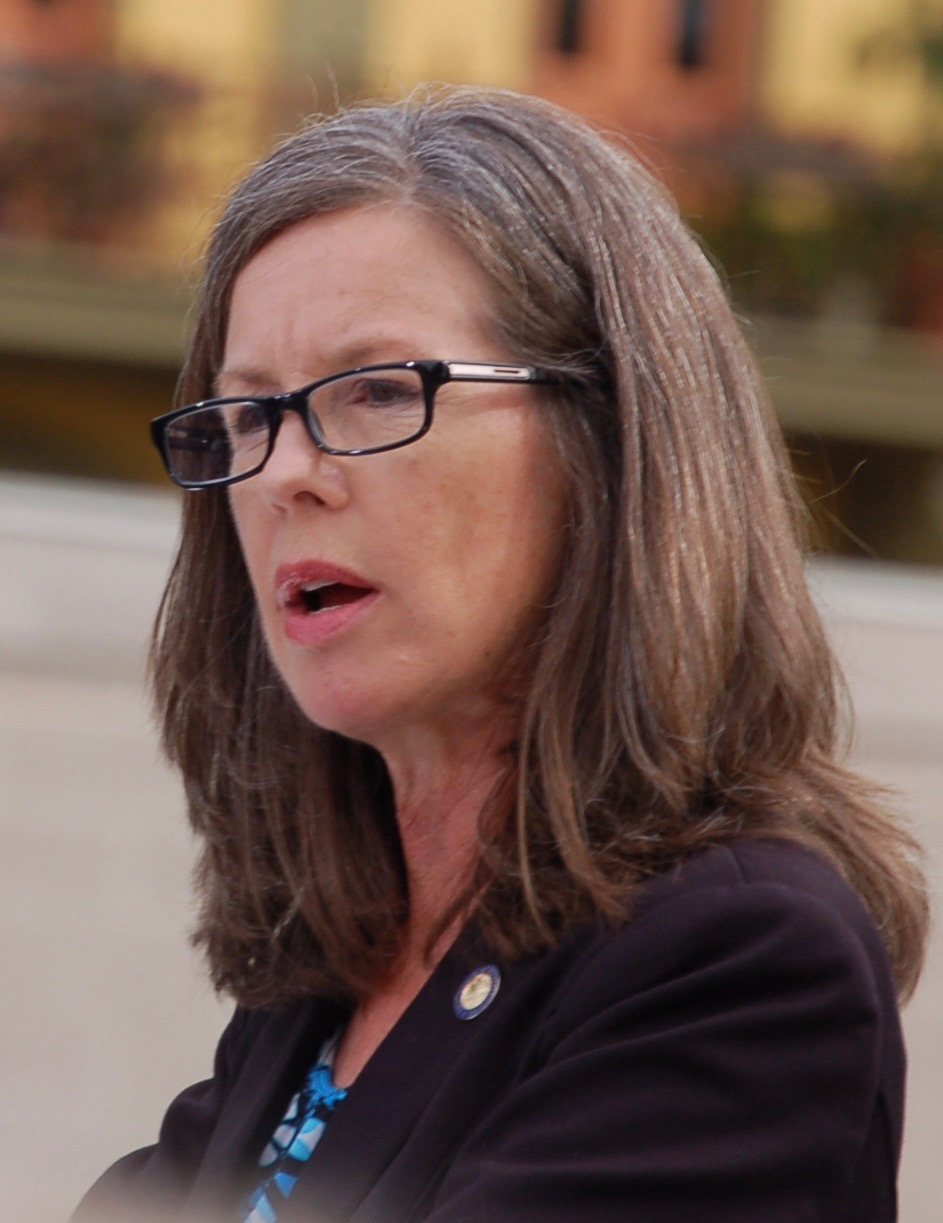
- Driehaus at a rally in 2016

Hamilton County Commissioner
- Incumbent
- Assumed office January 3, 2017 Serving with Alicia Reece and Stephanie Summerow Dumas
- Preceded by: Dennis Deters

Member of the Ohio House of Representatives from the 31st district
- In office January 5, 2009 – December 31, 2016
- Preceded by: Steve Driehaus
- Succeeded by: Brigid Kelly

Personal details
- Born: January 23, 1963 (age 63) Cincinnati, Ohio, U.S.
- Party: Democratic
- Education: Miami University
- Profession: Small business owner

Denise Driehaus (born January 23, 1963) is an American Democratic politician currently serving as a Hamilton County Commissioner. She previously served in the Ohio House of Representatives from 2009 to 2016.

== Life and career ==
Driehaus was raised in Green Township by H. Donald "Don" Driehaus and his wife Clare along with her seven siblings. Her seat in the Ohio House of Representatives was previously represented by her brother Steve Driehaus.

After graduation from Miami University, Driehaus went on to own Philipps Swim Club and the Front Porch Coffeehouse in West Price Hill. She also formerly served on the Hamilton County Democratic Executive Committee, and was influential in electing Cincinnati politicians like Todd Portune, David Crowley, Dwight Tillery and John Cranley.

Driehaus and her family reside in Cincinnati.

== Ohio House of Representatives ==
With her term-limited brother, Representative Steve Driehaus, running for Congress, Driehaus sought to succeed him in 2008. With no primary opposition, she faced Republican Steve Johnson in the general election, and won with 67% of the vote.

In her 2010 reelection bid, Driehaus' seat was looked at as a potential pick-up by Republicans. Once again unopposed in the primary, she went on to run against Republican Mike Robinson in the general election. However, she managed to keep her seat, winning this time 56% to 44%.

Driehaus has become vocal in regards to a plan to scrap portions of the education reform of former Ohio Governor Ted Strickland, as well as the current education funding formulas of John Kasich.

In 2012, Driehaus won a third term with 71.10% of the vote over Republican Michael Gabbard. She won a fourth term in 2014 with 65% of the vote.

=== Committee assignments ===
- Committee on Finance & Appropriations (Ranking Democrat)
- Committee on Economic & Workforce Development
- Committee on Ways & Means

== Hamilton County Commissioner ==
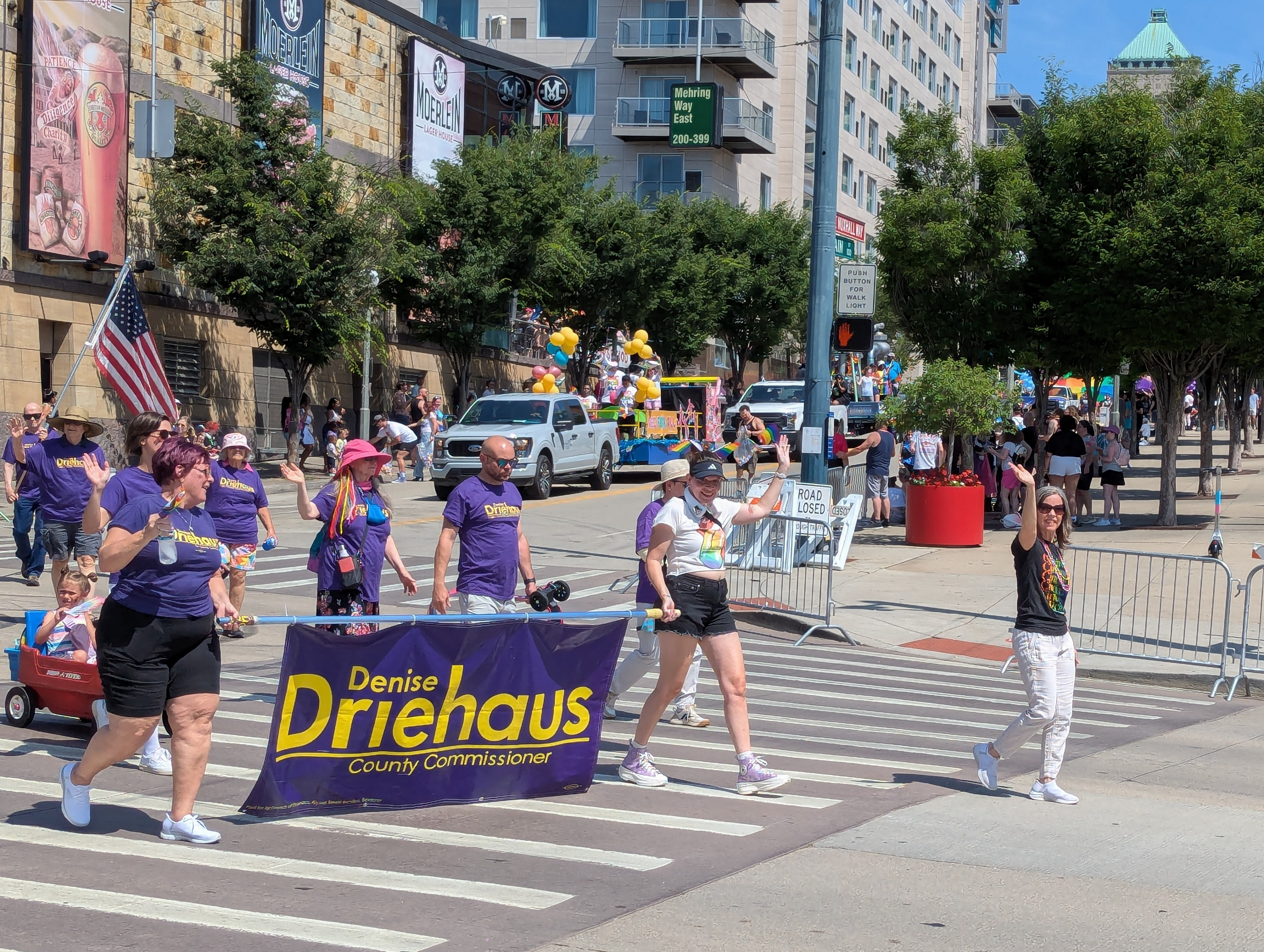
Driehaus walking in the 2025 Cincinnati Pride parade

In 2016, Driehaus was elected as Hamilton County Commissioner, replacing her opponent Dennis Deters. Her term in office began January 3, 2017. Driehaus was re-elected as Hamilton County Commissioner in 2020 and 2024.

== Electoral history ==
Ohio House 31st District: Results 2008 to 2014
Year	Democrat	Votes	Pct	Republican	Votes	Pct	Libertarian	Votes	Pct
2008	Denise Driehaus	25,600	68.57%	Steve Johnson	11,735	31.43%	N/A		
2010	Denise Driehaus	12,981	56.22%	Mike Robinson	10,107	43.78%	N/A		
2012	Denise Driehaus	35,982	71.40%	Michael Gabbard	14,512	28.60%	N/A		
2014	Denise Driehaus	17,798	65.65%	Mary Yeager	8,426	31.08%	Queen Noble	887	3.27%

Hamiliton County Commissioner: Results 2016 to 2024
Year	Democrat	Votes	Pct	Republican	Votes	Pct	Libertarian	Votes	Pct
2016	Denise Driehaus	198,132	50.61%	Dennis Deters	193,390	49.39%	N/A		
2020	Denise Driehaus	241,806	58.14%	Matthew Paul O'Neill	174,088	41.86%	N/A		
2024	Denise Driehaus	222,975	56.77%	Adam Koehler	156,683	39.89%	Leandro Llambi	13,127	3.34%
