= Stephen Slesnick =

American politician

Member of the Ohio House of Representatives from the 49th district
- In office March 11, 2008 – December 31, 2016
- Preceded by: William J. Healy II
- Succeeded by: Tom West

Personal details
- Born: December 3, 1977 (age 48) Canton, Ohio, U.S.
- Party: Democratic
- Education: Ohio State University
- Profession: Business

Stephen Slesnick (born October 28, 1977) is a former member of the Ohio House of Representatives who represented the 49th District from 2008 to 2016. A Democrat, Slesnick represented portions of Stark County, including Canton and Massillon.

== Life and career ==
A lifelong resident of Canton, Ohio, after graduating from Ohio State University. He also has worked for Morgan Stanley and Octagon.

== Ohio House of Representatives ==
When William J. Healy II resigned from the Ohio House to become Mayor of Canton, nine people, including Slesnick, sought appointment to the seat. However, House Democrats decided to wait for the results of the 2008 primary, where Slesnick was up against four others for the Democratic nomination. He won the nomination with 29.02% of the electorate, and completed the remainder of Healy's term.

In his campaign for his first full term, Slesnick faced Republican Richard Hart. He won the election with 68.6% of the vote. For the 128th General Assembly, Speaker of the House Armond Budish named Slesnick as Chairman of the Agriculture & Development Subcommittee of the House Finance Committee.

In the 2010 cycle, Slesnick ran for reelection against Republican Travis Secrest, and won with 62.89% of the vote. Slesnick won reelection in 2012 with 69.75% over Republican Monique Moore. He won a final term in 2014 with 62% of the vote.

=== Committee assignments ===
- House Committee on Commerce & Labor
- House Committee on Public Utilities
- House Committee on State Government

== Electoral history ==
Election results
Year	Office	Election	Votes for Slesnick	%	Opponent	Party	Votes	%
2008	Ohio House of Representatives	General	21,492	69.01%	Richard Hart	Republican	9,652	30.99%
2010	Ohio House of Representatives	General	16,563	62.52%	Travis Secrest	Republican	9,929	37.48%
2012	Ohio House of Representatives	General	31,354	69.75%	Monique Moore	Republican	13,601	30.25%
2014	Ohio House of Representatives	General	15,331	64.00%	Dallas Charton	Republican	8,624	36.00%
