= Philip H. Rose =

American politician

Member of the Ohio House of Representatives from the 87th district
- In office January 18, 2012-April 18, 2012
- Preceded by: John Carey
- Succeeded by: Ryan Smith

Personal details
- Born: February 26, 1946 (age 80) McArthur, Ohio
- Party: Republican
- Education: Ohio State University
- Profession: Attorney

Philip H. Rose (born February 26, 1946) is a Republican politician who formerly served as member of the Ohio House of Representatives, serving the 87th District in 2012.
