= Tom Dunlap =

American politician

Huron County Commissioner
- In office 2013–2017
- Preceded by: Terry Boose
- Succeeded by: Terry Boose

Sheriff of Huron County
- In office 1984–1989

Personal details
- Born: April 4, 1955 (age 71) Norwalk, Ohio
- Party: Democratic
- Other political affiliations: Republican

Tom Dunlap (born April 4, 1955) is an American politician, law enforcement officer and educator. Dunlap served as Sheriff of Huron County, Ohio in the 1980s and has served as Huron County Commissioner since January 3, 2013.

== Early life ==
Tom Dunlap was born in Norwalk, Ohio, on April 4, 1955, to Dale and Barbra Dunlap of Clarksfield, Ohio. His mother was an office manager for Landmark Elevator and his father was a farmer and UAW worker. Dunlap graduated from New London High School and EHOVE Career Center in 1974, where he studied agriculture. The following year, he completed his studies at the Ohio Peace Officers Training Academy.

== Criminal justice career ==
Dunlap worked as an officer for the Huron County Sheriff's Department from 1974 until 1984 and was elected Sheriff of Huron County, Ohio, in 1984. He served in that capacity until 1989. Following his term as sheriff, he served as commander of the Criminal Justice Academy at EHOVE Career Center from 1992 through 2012.

== Political career ==
In 2011, Dunlap announced that he would seek to succeed Terry Boose as Huron County Commissioner. He defeated Republican Larry Silcox in the general election of 2012 and was seated on the Huron County Board of Commissioners in January 2013.

In December 2015, Dunlap filed to run as the Democratic candidate for the Ohio House of Representatives, representing the 57th District. He ran unopposed in the district's 2016 Democratic primary, and was defeated by incumbent Republican Dick Stein in the general election.
