= Bill Hayes (politician) =

American politician

Member of the Ohio House of Representatives from the 72nd district
- In office January 3, 2011 – December 31, 2016
- Preceded by: Dan Dodd
- Succeeded by: Larry Householder

Personal details
- Born: July 30, 1952 (age 74) Columbus, Ohio, U.S.
- Party: Republican
- Education: Capital University, Ohio State University
- Profession: Attorney

Bill Hayes (born July 30, 1952) is a former member of the Ohio House of Representatives, serving the 72nd District from 2011 to 2016.
