= Debbie Phillips =

American politician

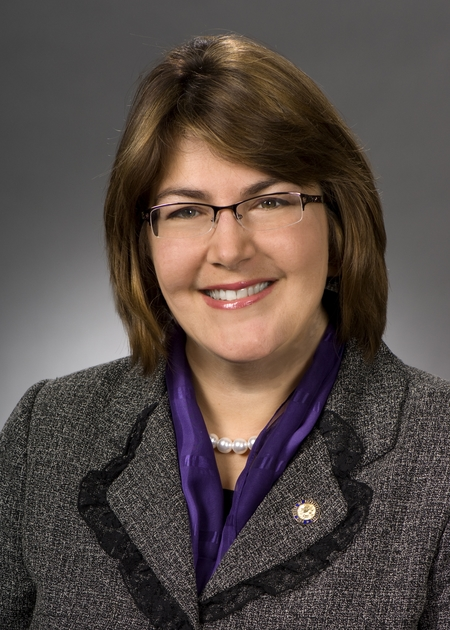

Member of the Ohio House of Representatives from the 94th district
- In office January 5, 2009 – December 31, 2016
- Preceded by: Jimmy Stewart
- Succeeded by: Jay Edwards

Personal details
- Born: October 12, 1969 (age 56) Columbus, Ohio, U.S.
- Party: Democratic
- Education: Ohio University
- Profession: Project Coordinator

Debbie Phillips (born October 12, 1969) is a former Democratic member of the Ohio House of Representatives, representing the 92nd District until 2009, then the 94th District from 2012 onward after the districts were redrawn. She also served as assistant minority whip. She is currently the CEO of Rural Action.

== Career ==
A graduate of Ohio University, Phillips sat on Athens City Council where she chaired the Planning and Development Committee. She was also the executive director of the Ohio Fair Schools Campaign.

== Ohio House of Representatives ==
Phillips initially ran for the Ohio House in 2006, when incumbent Jimmy Stewart was vying for a third term. In a contested race which proved to be undecided on election night, Stewart narrowly defeated Phillips with 51.08% of the vote.

In 2008, Phillips opted to run again. However, with Stewart now running for the Ohio Senate, Phillips quickly became the favorite to win the seat. Instead, she faced Athens County Auditor Jill Thompson in the general election, who proved to be a viable candidate. In the end, Phillips won with her second try, securing 50.47% of the vote.

In 2010, Phillips was a top target for House Republicans, who saw her as vulnerable in the Republican leaning district. Fielded was Mike Hunter, a retired lieutenant colonel with the State Highway Patrol. However, she won reelection with 52.59% of the vote. After the election and with Democrats now in the minority, House colleagues chose Phillips to serve as assistant minority whip. She also served on the committees of Rules and Reference, Finance and Appropriations and its Primary and Secondary Education Subcommittee, Education, and Agriculture and Natural Resources.

Phillips won re-election to a 4th term in November 2014, narrowly defeating Republican Yolan Dennis 50.68% to 49.32%. Phillips was barred from running for another term in 2016 due to Ohio term-limit laws.

== Policies, positions and initiatives ==
Education

With Republicans gaining the House majority in 2011, Phillips remained critical of the majority's plan to eliminate former Governor Ted Strickland's model for school funding, stating, "If we back away from our responsibility, it's going to be local taxpayers or the mom who now has to pay tuition for her child to attend kindergarten." She also brought forth concerns that changes to the all-day kindergarten provision would conflict with the state's Race to the Top plan, which had garnered $400 million in federal funding for Ohio schools.

Phillips was critical of Ohio Schools Superintendent Stan Heffner, alleging that he influenced state contract awards to benefit a business that later offered him employment.

She also threatened legal action if Governor John Kasich did not offer actual budget numbers regarding his education funding in the biennium budget.

Collective bargaining

Phillips is a staunch supporter of continuing collective bargaining for public employees. She has stated that she's "amazed" at how enthusiastic residents have been about repealing SB5.
