= Ryan Smith (Ohio politician) =

American politician in Ohio

President of University of Rio Grande and Rio Grande Community College
- Incumbent
- Assumed office October 14, 2019

103rd Speaker of the Ohio House of Representatives
- In office June 6, 2018 – January 7, 2019
- Preceded by: Kirk Schuring (Acting)
- Succeeded by: Larry Householder

Member of the Ohio House of Representatives from the 93rd district
- In office April 18, 2012 – October 3, 2019
- Preceded by: Philip H. Rose
- Succeeded by: Jason Stephens

Personal details
- Born: February 23, 1973 (age 53) Gallipolis, Ohio, U.S.
- Party: Republican
- Education: Ohio State University (BS)

Ryan Smith (born February 23, 1973) is an American university administrator and former Republican member of the Ohio House of Representatives, who served the 93rd District from 2012 to 2019. Since 2019, he has served as President of University of Rio Grande and Rio Grande Community College.

On June 6, 2018, he was named Speaker of the House. In January 2019, Smith was defeated by Larry Householder for the Speaker's gavel.

His district included all of Gallia and Jackson counties as well as much of Lawrence and Vinton counties. Smith also served as the Chairman of the House Finance Committee, often the most powerful chairmanship in the Ohio House.

== Life and career ==
Smith graduated from Ohio State University with a B.S. in Finance in 1995. He is a financial consultant, partner and vice president at Smith Financial Advisors of Hilliard Lyons.

In 2007, Smith opted to run for the Gallipolis City School Board of Education, and won. He would win reelection to his seat in 2011. He is married to his wife, Vicki, and together they have four children.

== House of Representatives ==
In late 2011, Representative John Carey resigned to take a position at Shawnee State University. Soon after, Smith announced his candidacy for the seat for the 2012 election. He faced two others in a primary election, and Philip H. Rose was appointed to the seat as a placeholder until a winner could be decided. Smith ultimately won the primary by 62 votes. In the general election held on November 6, 2012, Smith defeated Democratic candidate Josh Bailey with 64.2% of the vote.

In 2014, Smith easily won re-election over Democrat Josh Bailey with over 70% of the vote. He is serving as Chairman of the House Finance Committee for the 131st Ohio General Assembly, and is tasked with carrying the state biennium budget.

After Speaker Cliff Rosenberger resigned on April 12, 2018, Smith announced that he would run for Speaker. During the race for Speaker while he had the most support, though he was never believed to have the necessary majority to be elected speaker. This caused Speaker Pro-Tempore Kirk Schuring to cancel House Session on multiple occasions, to give Smith more time to get the votes that he needed and try to bridge the Republican caucus divide. In June Schuring put forward two options to the House in a straw poll, either they could hold a vote for speaker or they could amend House rules to allow the Speaker Pro Tempore to continue through the rest of the year. A majority of House members decided that a vote should be held. On June 6, 2018, the vote for speaker was held during House session. The nominees where Rep. Ryan Smith, Rep. Andy Thompson, Rep. Jim Hughes, and Rep. Fred Strahorn. House rules required that a nominee receive a majority of the votes of those present for the vote, or after 10 votes if no nominee has received a majority then on the 11th vote the nominee with the plurality will be named Speaker. 7 Representatives were absent for the vote bringing the required majority from 50 down to 46. Smith was elected on the 11th vote by plurality, receiving 44 votes (his vote count remained the same and never changed over all 11 rounds).

Speaker Smith had been disgruntled that Representative Jim Butler, Dean of the House Caucus for the 133rd General Assembly and the only one with the ability to call the vote for speaker, had not called a vote before the official speaker election, so that the Caucus could come to a consensus. Smith asked Speaker Pro-Tempore Kirk Schuring, Dean of the House Caucus for the 132nd General Assembly, to call the vote. The caucus meeting and vote was held on December 27, 2018. Only 34 Republicans showed up, with 26 boycotting the event. Of the 34 who showed up, all voted for Smith to be Speaker for the 133rd General Assembly. Rep. Butler called the vote illegitimate as Schuring called the vote, not him. Butler said “Any claim that a meeting called by Rep. Schuring or someone else is a legitimate caucus of the 133rd General Assembly is false.” Schuring won't be a member of the House next year as he was elected to become a State Senator. Butler called the Thursday meeting a “Ryan Smith campaign event." Butler went on further to say "To describe an illegitimate meeting of 34 people as anything else is quite a stretch when it takes 50 votes of the 99-member House to become Speaker,” he said. “The actual vote for the next Speaker of the House with all 99 Representatives present will take place on January 7th.”

== Committee assignments ==
- House Committee on Finance & Appropriations (Chair)
- House Committee on Education
- House Committee on Government Accountability & Oversight

== Electoral history ==
Election results
Year	Office	Election	Votes for Smith	%	Opponent	Party	Votes	%
2012	Ohio House of Representatives	General	29,215	64.37%	Josh Bailey	Democratic	15,290	35.73%
2014	Ohio House of Representatives	General	18,925	70.07%	Josh Bailey	Democratic	8,082	29.93%

Political offices
Preceded by Kirk Schuring; Acting	Speaker of the Ohio House of Representatives; 2018–2019	Succeeded by Larry Householder
