= Christie Bryant =

American politician

Member of the Ohio House of Representatives from the 32nd district
- In office January 3, 2015 – December 31, 2016
- Preceded by: Dale Mallory
- Succeeded by: Catherine Ingram

Personal details
- Born: July 14, 1979 (age 47)
- Party: Democratic

Christie Bryant (born July, 14th 1979) is a former Representative for the 32nd district of the Ohio House of Representatives. Bryant is a native of Cincinnati, and made her first run for public office in 2014 for the Ohio House to succeed Dale Mallory, who was term-limited. She attended Walnut Hills High School and the University of Cincinnati, for both an undergraduate degree and for a juris doctor. Unopposed for the primary, Bryant went on to win the general election against Republican opponent Brian McIntosh with over 70% of the vote. She did not seek re-election in 2016.

== Links ==
- Official campaign site
