= John Becker (politician) =

American politician from Ohio

Member of the Ohio House of Representatives from the 65th district
- In office January 7, 2013 – December 31, 2020
- Preceded by: Joe Uecker
- Succeeded by: Jean Schmidt

Personal details
- Party: Republican
- Education: Northern Kentucky University (BS); Xavier University (MBA)

John Becker is an American politician who served as a member of the Ohio House of Representatives for the 65th district.

== Early life and education ==
Becker was raised in Fort Thomas, Kentucky. He earned a Bachelor of Science degree in management from Northern Kentucky University and a Master of Business Administration with an emphasis on taxation from Xavier University.

== Career ==
Becker has also served as a Republican State Central Committee and Clermont County Republican Central Committee member and is a tax accountant and utility consultant.

Becker was elected to his first term in November 2012, defeating Democrat Steve Myers with 68.7% of the vote.

=== Ohio Legislature ===
Becker claims to be the most conservative politician in the Ohio legislature. He introduced bills in 2013 to allow state employees to carry guns on the job in most state buildings and to prohibit law enforcement agencies from destroying firearms confiscated by the police.

In 2003, before his election to the legislature, Becker wrote a letter to the editor of the Cincinnati Enquirer pointing out that as Massachusetts had recently allowed same-sex marriage, the federal government was required to amend the Constitution to prohibit such unions, or failing that expel Massachusetts from the Union. The previous year, in another such letter, he proposed allowing Alaska to leave the Union so that it would be free to produce more oil.

==== HB 182 ====
In April 2019, John Becker sponsored Ohio HB 182, drafted with assistance of Barry Sheets (a lobbyist for the Right to Life Action Coalition of Ohio), which prevents insurance from covering birth control and pregnancy termination (unless maternal life is at risk). However, he drew widespread condemnation for including a clause stipulating that insurance should cover implantation of an ectopic pregnancy into the uterus. This is not an existing procedure, and it is believed by the medical community to be impossible.

==== COVID-19 and impeachment ====
In August 2020, during the coronavirus pandemic, Becker drew up impeachment papers against Governor Mike DeWine of Ohio; Nino Vitale and Paul Zeltwanger co-sponsored and were later joined by Candice Keller. The move was criticized by legal scholars and commentators. Ohio Republican Party Chair Jane Timken "issued a scathing condemnation of the trio of conservatives", calling the move "a baseless, feeble attempt at creating attention for themselves." Ohio House Speaker, Republican Bob Cupp, called it an "imprudent attempt" to cause "a state constitutional crisis". Legal scholar Jonathan Entin said the proposal "means that we've distorted our understanding both of what impeachment is supposed to do and how people – especially, elected officials – are supposed to disagree with each other. Do we really want to say that the government can't act in an emergency because the officials are afraid that if they do anything, they'll be removed from office? Of course, if they don't do anything, maybe the response is going to be 'Well you should be impeached for not acting.'" CNN's Chris Cillizza analyzed it as one of several examples of how Donald Trump had politicized public health matters to the point Republican lawmakers felt they needed to make extreme and pointless moves in order to satisfy the base. After the representatives formally filed the articles at the end of November, DeWine recommended they visit a hospital and talk to nurses. On December 1, Becker went on Tucker Carlson Tonight where he stated, "20 of the 88 counties in Ohio filed private citizen affidavit, which is seeking criminal charges against the Governor."

== Personal life ==
He is married with two children.
