= Brian Hill (Ohio politician) =

American politician

Member of the Ohio Senate from the 20th district
- In office January 7, 2019 - May 22, 2019
- Preceded by: Troy Balderson
- Succeeded by: Tim Schaffer

Member of the Ohio House of Representatives from the 97th district
- In office July 24, 2011 – January 7, 2019
- Preceded by: Troy Balderson
- Succeeded by: Adam Holmes

Personal details
- Party: Republican
- Education: Ohio State University

Brian Hill is an American politician in the U.S. State of Ohio. He is a Republican state legislator who served in both the Ohio House of Representatives and the Ohio Senate.

== Biography ==
Hill earned his associate degree and bachelor's degree from Ohio State University. He previously served for six years as commissioner of Muskingum County. He raises beef cattle and grows crops on a farm he owns with his father. Hill and his family reside in Zanesville, Ohio.
