= Larry Householder =

American politician and convicted felon

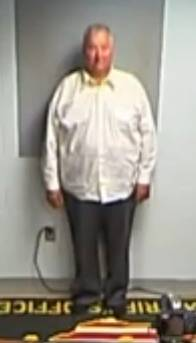
- Householder in Butler County Jail in 2023

98th and 104th Speaker of the Ohio House of Representatives
- In office January 7, 2019 – July 30, 2020
- Preceded by: Ryan Smith
- Succeeded by: Robert R. Cupp
- In office January 3, 2001 – December 31, 2004
- Preceded by: Jo Ann Davidson
- Succeeded by: Jon Husted

Member of the Ohio House of Representatives
- In office January 3, 2017 – June 16, 2021
- Preceded by: Bill Hayes
- Succeeded by: Kevin D. Miller
- Constituency: 72nd district
- In office January 3, 2003 – December 31, 2004
- Preceded by: Joseph Sulzer
- Succeeded by: Ron Hood
- Constituency: 91st district
- In office January 3, 1997 – December 31, 2002
- Preceded by: Mary Abel
- Succeeded by: Derrick Seaver
- Constituency: 78th district

Personal details
- Born: Larry Lee Householder; June 6, 1959 (age 67) Zanesville, Ohio, U.S.
- Party: Republican
- Spouse: Taundra Householder
- Children: 6
- Education: Ohio University (BA)

Larry Lee Householder (born June 6, 1959) is an American former politician who was convicted in the Ohio FirstEnergy bribery scandal, the largest bribery corruption scandal in Ohio's history. Householder was the state representative for Ohio's 72nd district and was a two-time Speaker of the Ohio House of Representatives. He is a member of the Republican Party. Householder represented the same district from 1997 to 2004, including as speaker from 2001 to 2004. In 2016, he was elected to the Statehouse again, and on January 7, 2019, he was re-elected to serve as speaker. His district included Coshocton and Perry counties, as well as about half of Licking County.

On July 21, 2020, the FBI arrested Householder on federal RICO charges. The charges allege that his return to politics in 2016 was part of a criminal conspiracy. The Ohio House of Representatives unanimously removed Householder as speaker on July 30. In November 2020, Householder won reelection to his seat in the Ohio House of Representatives but he was expelled from the House on June 16, 2021. Householder was convicted of racketeering after a jury trial and received the maximum sentence of 20 years in federal prison on June 29, 2023, for his role in the bribery scandal. As a convicted felon, Ohio law prohibits Householder from holding public office in the state. He is currently imprisoned at Federal Correctional Institution, Elkton in Elkton, Ohio.

== Early life and education ==
Born in Zanesville, Ohio, Householder was raised in Junction City, Ohio, where he worked on his family's farm. He then attended Ohio University, earning a degree in political science. He is married with six children.

== Career ==
Householder ran an insurance agency and served as Perry County commissioner before seeking higher office.

=== Ohio House of Representatives ===
==== 1997–2004 ====
In 1996, he ran for Ohio's 78th House district, challenging incumbent Democrat Mary Abel of Athens. Householder defeated Abel with 55.03% of the vote. He was reelected three times.

In 1998, Householder was elected to serve as assistant majority whip. In 2001, he was elected to serve as Speaker of the Ohio House of Representatives, the highest post in the House. He served two terms as speaker, during which he led major legislative reforms, including introducing concealed carry, passing tort reform, and defunding Planned Parenthood—making Ohio the first state to do so.

In 2004, Householder and several top advisers were investigated for alleged money laundering and irregular campaign practices. The government closed the case without filing charges. He was term-limited in 2004. Householder was later elected the Perry County Auditor.

==== 2017–2021 ====
When incumbent state Representative Bill Hayes ran for Licking County prosecutor in 2016, Householder ran for his old seat, renamed District 72 after redistricting. Householder defeated Cliff N. Biggers in the Republican primary with almost 64% of the vote. He won the general election against Democrat John Carlisle with 72% of the vote. A former Speaker, Householder became a freshman legislator along with former President of the Ohio Senate Keith Faber. On January 7, 2019, a bipartisan majority of legislators elected him to serve again as speaker of the Ohio House.

==== Library programming controversy ====
In May 2019, Householder criticized the Ohio Library Council and the Newark Library in Licking County for providing an event for teens in the LGBTQ community at the taxpayers' expense. In response, the Newark Ohio Pride Coalition issued a formal statement noting that their organization paid for the event with a non-governmental grant. Later that evening, the Newark Library canceled the event. The Newark Ohio Pride Coalition found a new location for it.

== Arrest ==
On July 21, 2020, the FBI arrested Householder and four others in connection with a $60 million bribery case involving the financial rescue of First Energy's two nuclear plants in Ohio, Davis–Besse and Perry. U.S. Attorney David M. DeVillers called it "likely the largest bribery scheme ever perpetrated against the state of Ohio". During a July 21 press briefing, DeVillers said that money from First Energy was filtered through a fake nonprofit organization to pay for bribes and evade campaign finance laws.

Following DeVillers's press conference, Republican Governor Mike DeWine asked Householder to resign. Later that day, Householder released a statement to the press saying he would not resign.

On July 30, 2020, the Ohio House of Representatives voted unanimously to remove Householder as Ohio House Speaker.

On June 16, 2021, the House voted to expel Householder by a bipartisan vote of 75–21.

On March 9, 2023, Householder was convicted of racketeering in relation to the First Energy scheme.

On June 29, 2023, Householder was sentenced to a maximum of 20 years for his crimes. Following sentencing, Householder was remanded into custody to begin serving his sentence in federal prison. Under federal law, he must serve at least 85% of his sentence after which time he may be eligible for early release in June 2040.

On May 31, 2024, Householder pleaded not guilty to 10 felony charges brought by the state of Ohio.

== Personal life ==
Larry Householder is married to Taundra Householder. They have five sons. They also had a daughter, who died in 1992.

Ohio House of Representatives
Preceded by Mary Abel	Member of the Ohio House of Representatives from the 78th district 1997–2003	Succeeded by Derrick Seaver
Preceded by Joseph Sulzer, Sr.	Member of the Ohio House of Representatives from the 91st district 2003–2004	Succeeded by Ron Hood
Preceded by Bill Hayes	Member of the Ohio House of Representatives from the 72nd district 2017–2021	Succeeded by Kevin D. Miller
Political offices
Preceded by Jo Ann Davidson	Speaker of the Ohio House of Representatives; 2001–2004	Succeeded by Jon A. Husted
Preceded by Ryan Smith	Speaker of the Ohio House of Representatives; 2019–2020	Succeeded by Robert R. Cupp
