= Doug Green (Ohio politician) =

American politician (1955–2021)

Member of the Ohio House of Representatives from the 66th district
- In office January 7, 2013 – December 31, 2020
- Preceded by: Danny Bubp
- Succeeded by: Adam Bird

Personal details
- Born: August 22, 1955
- Died: September 1, 2021 (aged 66)
- Party: Republican

Doug Green (August 22, 1955 – September 1, 2021) was an American politician. He was a Republican member of the Ohio House of Representatives for the 66th district from 2013 to 2020.

== Biography ==
Green was elected in 2012, winning the Republican primary with 39% of the vote and defeating Democrat Ken McNeely in the general election with 75% of the vote. He previously served as auditor and recorder of Brown County, Ohio.

Green died at the age of 66 after contracting COVID-19 amidst the COVID-19 pandemic in Ohio.
