= Steve Hambley =

American politician

Member of the Ohio House of Representatives from the 69th district
- In office January 3, 2015 – December 31, 2020
- Preceded by: William G. Batchelder
- Succeeded by: Sharon Ray

Personal details
- Born: August 30, 1954 (age 71)
- Party: Republican
- Education: University of Akron (Ph.D.)

Steve Hambley (born August 30, 1954) is the former Representative for the 69th district of the Ohio House of Representatives. Hambley formerly served as a Medina County Commissioner for 18 years prior to seeking election to the Ohio House of Representatives, as well as a Brunswick City Councilman. He is a graduate of the University of Akron. When William G. Batchelder, the Speaker of the House who had served in the House for 38 years retired in 2014, Hambley was elected to replace him with 69% of the vote.
