= Robert R. Cupp =

Ohio legislator (born 1950)

Bob Cupp
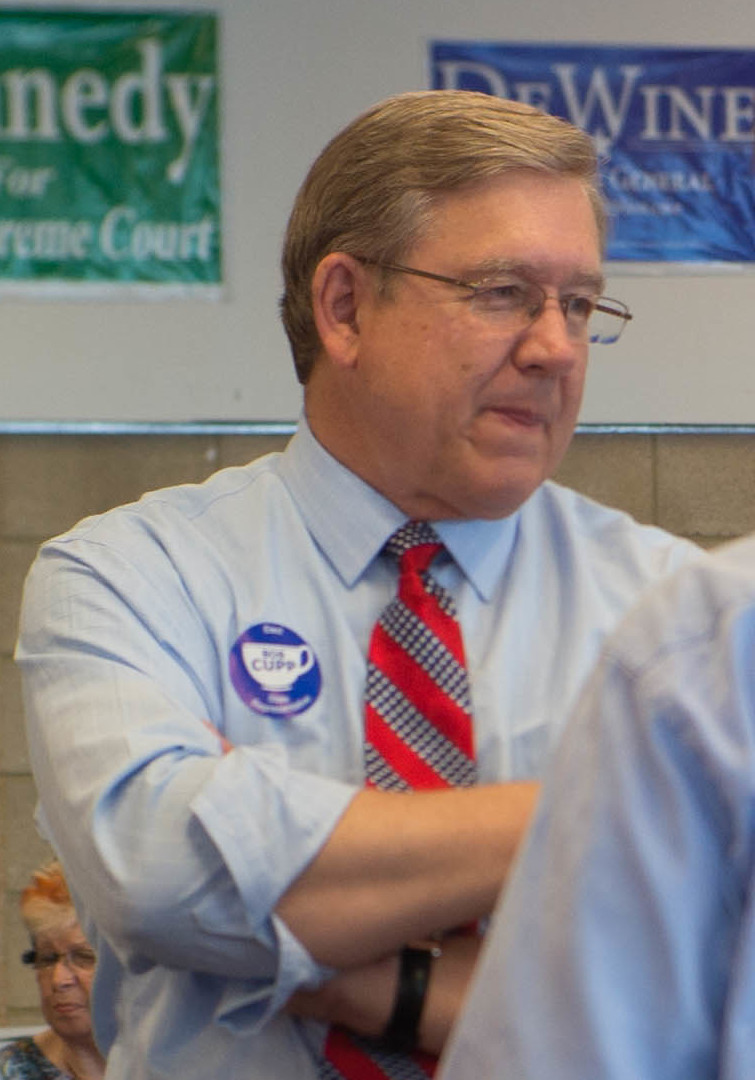
- Cupp in 2014

105th Speaker of the Ohio House of Representatives
- In office July 30, 2020 – December 31, 2022
- Preceded by: Larry Householder
- Succeeded by: Jason Stephens

Member of the Ohio House of Representatives from the 4th district
- In office January 6, 2015 – December 31, 2022
- Preceded by: Matt Huffman
- Succeeded by: Mary Lightbody

Justice of the Ohio Supreme Court
- In office January 2, 2007 – January 1, 2013
- Preceded by: Alice Robie Resnick
- Succeeded by: William O'Neill

President pro tempore of the Ohio Senate
- In office January 3, 1997 – December 31, 2000
- Preceded by: Richard Finan
- Succeeded by: Bruce Johnson

Member of the Ohio Senate from the 12th district
- In office January 3, 1985 – December 31, 2000
- Preceded by: Steve Maurer
- Succeeded by: Jim Jordan

Personal details
- Born: November 9, 1950 (age 75) Bluffton, Ohio, U.S.
- Party: Republican
- Spouse: Libby Cupp
- Children: 2
- Education: Ohio Northern University (BA, JD)
- Website: Campaign website

Robert Richard Cupp (born November 9, 1950) is an American politician who served as the Speaker of the Ohio House of Representatives from 2020 to 2022. He served in the House of Representatives from 2015, representing District 4 (Lima). He was elected as speaker on July 30, 2020, replacing Larry Householder who was removed from the position following his arrest on federal bribery charges. Cupp is a former justice of the Ohio Supreme Court.

== Education ==
Cupp graduated from Ohio Northern University with a degree in political science in 1973. He earned a Juris Doctor from Claude W. Pettit College of Law in 1976.

== Career ==
Cupp was a Lima prosecutor from 1976 to 1980 and was elected Allen County Commissioner twice, from 1981 to 1984 and 2000 to 2002.

He was a member of the Ohio Senate from 1985 to 2000, but was forced to retire due to legislative term limits. He was President Pro-Tem of the Senate from 1997 to 2000. During his time in the Senate, he spent ten years serving on the Judiciary Committee.

=== Ohio Supreme Court ===
He was elected November 7, 2006 to a six-year term and was sworn in on January 2, 2007. His term expired January 1, 2013 following his election loss to William O'Neill. Before joining the Ohio Supreme Court, Cupp gained appellate judicial experience as a judge on the Ohio Court of Appeals (Third Judicial District) from 2003 to 2006.

=== 2012 election for the Ohio Supreme Court ===
The Columbus Dispatch, Cleveland Plain Dealer, Toledo Blade, and Youngstown Vindicator endorsed Robert Cupp for re-election in the November 6, 2012 election. Cupp and his opponent William O'Neill were both recommended for the 2012 Supreme Court election by the Ohio State Bar Association, and rated "excellent" by the Ohio Women's Bar Association

On November 6, 2012, Cupp lost his bid for re-election to O'Neill by a margin of 5%. Cupp would remain out of office for only two years, successfully running for a seat in the Ohio House of Representatives in 2014.

== Anti-vaccination controversy ==
In 2021 Sherri Tenpenny presented at a hearing with the Ohio House of Representatives regarding House Bill 248. In the hearing, Tenpenny pushed false claims that the COVID-19 vaccines contain metals bonded to the proteins which she claimed results in people becoming magnetized. Cupp defended the invitation to Tenpenny's testimony despite the lack of factual basis for her claims and despite the condemnation by the Ohio Osteopathic Association. Tenpenny's position was supported by testimony from Nurse Joanna Overholt who failed to demonstrate with a metal key the magnetism theory propounded by the doctor.

== See also ==
- Ohio Supreme Court elections#Candidates for Ohio Supreme Court Justice (4)

Political offices
Preceded by Larry Householder	Speaker of the Ohio House of Representatives; 2020–2022	Succeeded by Jason Stephens
