= 129th Ohio General Assembly =

Term of state legislature in Ohio, US

←	128th	130th	→
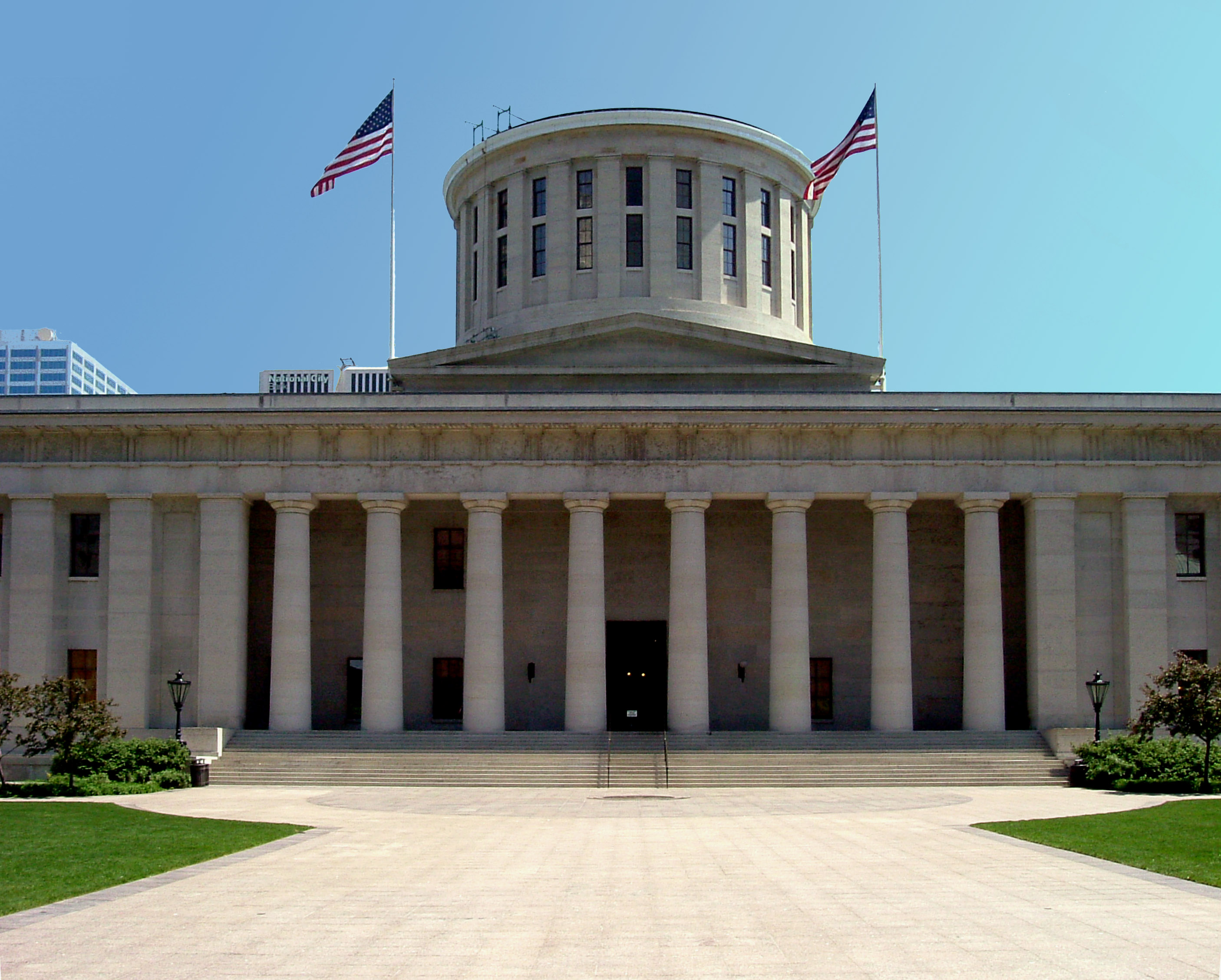
- Ohio Statehouse (2004)

Overview
- Term: January 3, 2011 – December 20, 2012

Ohio Senate
- Members: 33 (23 R, 10 D)
- President of the Senate: Tom Niehaus (R)
- President Pro Tempore: Keith Faber (R)
- Party control: Republican Party

Ohio House of Representatives
- Members: 99 (59 R, 40 D)
- House Speaker: William Batchelder (R)
- Party control: Republican Party

Sessions
- 1st: January 3, 2011 – December 29, 2011
- 2nd: January 3, 2012 – December 20, 2012

The One Hundred Twenty-ninth Ohio General Assembly was a meeting of the Ohio state legislature, composed of the Ohio State Senate and the Ohio House of Representatives. It met in Columbus, Ohio from January 3, 2011 until December 20, 2012. While Ted Strickland was Ohio Governor for the first week of the biennium, John Kasich was sworn in during the second week. The apportionment of districts was based on the 2000 United States census. This was the last time the 2000 census was used by the General Assembly to determine the apportionment of legislative districts. While the Ohio Senate was retained by the Ohio Republican Party, they won control of the Ohio House of Representatives from the Ohio Democratic Party.

== Major legislation ==
=== Enacted ===
- February 18, 2011: JobsOhio: Privatization of Development Department
- March 30, 2011: Ohio Biennium Transportation Budget 2012–2013
- March 31, 2011: Collective Bargaining Reform for Public Employees

== Party summary ==
Resignations and new members are discussed in the "Changes in membership" section, below.

=== Senate ===
	Party (Shading indicates majority caucus)		Total	Vacant
	Republican	Democratic	Total	Vacant
End of previous Assembly	21	12	33	0
Begin	23	10	33	0
Latest voting share	69.7%	30.3%		

=== House of Representatives ===
	Party (Shading indicates majority caucus)		Total	Vacant
	Democratic	Republican	Total	Vacant
End of previous Assembly	53	46	99	0
Begin	40	59	99	0
Latest voting share	40.4%	59.6%		

== Leadership ==
=== Senate ===
- Senate President: Tom Niehaus
- President Pro Tempore: Keith Faber

Majority (Republican) leadership

- Majority Floor Leader: Jimmy Stewart
- Majority Whip: Shannon Jones

Minority (Democratic) leadership

- Senate Minority Leader: Capri Cafaro
- Assistant Minority Leader: Shirley Smith
- Minority Whip: Edna Brown
- Assistant Minority Whip: Jason Wilson

=== House of Representatives ===
- Speaker of the House: William G. Batchelder
- Speaker Pro Tempore: Lou Blessing

Majority (Republican) leadership

- Majority Floor Leader: Matt Huffman
- Assistant Majority Floor Leader: Barbara Sears
- Majority Whip: John Adams
- Assistant Majority Whip: Cheryl Grossman

Minority (Democratic) leadership

- House Minority Leader: Armond Budish
- Assistant Minority Leader: Matt Szollosi
- Minority Whip: Tracy Maxwell Heard
- Assistant Minority Whip: Debbie Phillips

== Membership ==
=== Senate ===
District	Senator	Party	Residence	First elected	Term limited
1	Cliff Hite	Republican	Findlay	2011 (Appt.)	2022
2	Mark Wagoner	Republican	Toledo	2008 (Appt.)	2016
3	Kevin Bacon	Republican	Worthington	2010	2018
4	Bill Coley	Republican	Middletown	2011 (Appt.)	2020
5	Bill Beagle	Republican	Tipp City	2010	2018
6	Peggy Lehner	Republican	Kettering	2011 (Appt.)	2020
7	Shannon Jones	Republican	Springboro	2009 (Appt.)	2018
8	Bill Seitz	Republican	Cincinnati	2007 (Appt.)	2016
9	Eric Kearney	Democratic	Cincinnati	2005 (Appt.)	2014
10	Chris Widener	Republican	Springfield	2008	2016
11	Edna Brown	Democratic	Toledo	2010	2018
12	Keith Faber	Republican	Celina	2007 (Appt.)	2016
13	Gayle Manning	Republican	North Ridgeville	2010	2018
14	Tom Niehaus	Republican	New Richmond	2004	2012
15	Charleta Tavares	Democratic	Columbus	2010	2018
16	Jim Hughes	Republican	Columbus	2008	2016
17	David T. Daniels	Republican	Greenfield	2010	2018
18	Tim Grendell	Republican	Chesterland	2004	2012
19	Kris Jordan	Republican	Dublin	2010	2018
20	Jimmy Stewart	Republican	Athens	2008	2016
21	Shirley Smith	Democratic	Cleveland	2006	2014
22	Larry Obhof	Republican	Montville Township	2011 (Appt.)	2020
23	Michael J. Skindell	Democratic	Cleveland	2010	2018
24	Tom Patton	Republican	Strongsville	2008 (Appt.)	2016
25	Nina Turner	Democratic	Cleveland	2008 (Appt.)	2018
26	Karen Gillmor	Republican	Tiffin	2008	2016
27	Frank LaRose	Republican	Fairlawn	2010	2018
28	Tom Sawyer	Democratic	Akron	2007 (Appt.)	2016
29	Scott Oelslager	Republican	Canton	2010	2018
30	Jason Wilson	Democratic	Columbiana	2007 (Appt.)	2016
31	Tim Schaffer	Republican	Lancaster	2006	2014
32	Capri Cafaro	Democratic	Hubbard	2007 (Appt.)	2016
33	Joe Schiavoni	Democratic	Canfield	2009 (Appt.)	2018

=== House of Representatives ===
District	Representative	Party	Residence	First elected	Term limited
1	Craig Newbold	Republican	Columbiana	2010	2018
2	Andrew Brenner	Republican	Powell	2010	2018
3	Ron Amstutz	Republican	Wooster	2008	2016
4	Matt Huffman	Republican	Lima	2006	2014
5	Gerald Stebelton	Republican	Lancaster	2006	2014
6	Randy Gardner	Republican	Bowling Green	2008 (Appt.)	2016
7	Kenny Yuko	Democrat	Richmond Heights	2004	2012
8	Armond Budish	Democrat	Beachwood	2006	2014
9	Barbara Boyd	Democrat	Cleveland Heights	2006	2014
10	Bill Patmon	Democrat	Cleveland	2010	2018
11	Sandra Williams	Democrat	Cleveland	2006	2014
12	John E. Barnes, Jr.	Democrat	Cleveland	2010	2018
13	Nickie Antonio	Democrat	Lakewood	2010	2018
14	Michael Foley	Democrat	Cleveland	2006 (Appt.)	2014
15	Timothy J. DeGeeter	Democrat	Parma	2003 (Appt.)	2012
16	Nan Baker	Republican	Westlake	2008	2016
17	Marlene Anielski	Republican	Walton Hills	2010	2018
18	Mike Dovilla	Republican	Berea	2010	2018
19	Anne Gonzales	Republican	Westerville	2010	2018
20	Nancy Garland	Democrat	New Albany	2008	2016
21	Mike Duffey	Republican	Worthington	2010	2018
22	John Patrick Carney	Democrat	Clintonville	2008	2016
23	Cheryl Grossman	Republican	Grove City	2008	2016
24	Ted Celeste	Democrat	Grandview Heights	2006	2014
25	Michael Stinziano	Democrat	Columbus	2010	2018
26	Tracy Maxwell Heard	Democrat	Columbus	2006	2014
27	W. Carlton Weddington	Democrat	Columbus	2008	2016
28	Connie Pillich	Democrat	Montgomery	2008	2016
29	Lou Blessing	Republican	Cincinnati	2004	2012
30	Louis Terhar	Republican	Columbus	2011 (Appt.)	2020
31	Denise Driehaus	Democrat	Cincinnati	2008	2016
32	Dale Mallory	Democrat	Cincinnati	2006	2014
33	Alicia Reece	Democrat	Cincinnati	2010 (Appt.)	2018
34	Peter Stautberg	Republican	Anderson Twp.	2008	2016
35	Ron Maag	Republican	Lebanon	2008	2016
36	Michael Henne	Republican	Clayton	2010	2018
37	Jim Butler	Republican	Oakwood	2011 (Appt.)	2020
38	Terry Blair	Republican	Washington Twp.	2008	2016
39	Clayton Luckie	Democrat	Dayton	2006 (Appt.)	2014
40	Roland Winburn	Democrat	Harrison Twp.	2008	2016
41	Lynn Slaby	Republican	Copley	2010	2018
42	Kristina Roegner	Republican	Hudson	2010	2018
43	Todd McKenney	Republican	Akron	2010	2018
44	Vernon Sykes	Democrat	Akron	2006	2014
45	Zack Milkovich	Democrat	Akron	2010	2018
46	Barbara Sears	Republican	Sylvania	2008 (Appt.)	2016
47	Teresa Fedor	Democrat	Toledo	2010	2018
48	Michael Ashford	Democrat	Toledo	2010	2018
49	Matt Szollosi	Democrat	Toledo	2006	2014
50	Christina Hagan	Republican	Marlboro Township	2011 (Appt.)	2020
51	Kirk Schuring	Republican	Canton	2010	2018
52	Stephen Slesnick	Democrat	Canton	2008 (Appt.)	2016
53	Timothy Derickson	Republican	Hanover Twp	2008	2016
54	Courtney Combs	Republican	Hamilton	2004 (Appt.)	2012
55	Margaret Conditt	Republican	Liberty Township	2011 (Appt.)	2020
56	Dan Ramos	Democrat	Lorain	2010	2018
57	Matt Lundy	Democrat	Elyria	2006	2014
58	Terry Boose	Republican	Norwalk	2008	2016
59	Ron Gerberry	Democrat	Austintown	2007 (Appt.)	2016
60	Bob Hagan	Democrat	Youngstown	2006	2014
61	Mark Okey	Democrat	Carrollton	2006	2014
62	Lorraine Fende	Democrat	Willowick	2004	2012
63	Ron Young	Republican	LeRoy Township	2010	2018
64	Tom Letson	Democrat	Warren	2006	2014
65	Sean O'Brien	Democrat	Niles	2010	2018
66	Joe Uecker	Republican	Loveland	2004	2012
67	Peter Beck	Republican	Mason	2009 (Appt.)	2018
68	Kathleen Clyde	Democrat	Kent	2010	2018
69	William G. Batchelder	Republican	Medina	2006	2014
70	Jarrod Martin	Republican	Beavercreek	2008	2016
71	Jay Hottinger	Republican	Newark	2006	2014
72	Ross McGregor	Republican	Springfield	2005 (Appt.)	2014
73	Jay Goyal	Democrat	Mansfield	2006	2014
74	Bruce Goodwin	Republican	Defiance	2006	2014
75	Lynn Wachtmann	Republican	Napoleon	2006	2014
76	Robert Sprague	Republican	Findlay	2011 (Appt.)	2020
77	Jim Buchy	Republican	Greenville	2011 (Appt.)	2020
78	John Adams	Republican	Sidney	2006	2014
79	Richard Adams	Republican	Troy	2008	2016
80	Dennis Murray	Democrat	Sandusky	2008	2016
81	Rex Damschroder	Republican	Fremont	2010	2018
82	Jeffrey McClain	Republican	Upper Sandusky	2008	2016
83	David Burke	Republican	Marysville	2008	2016
84	Bob Hackett	Republican	London	2008	2016
85	Bob Peterson	Republican	Sabina	2010	2018
86	Cliff Rosenberger	Republican	Clarksville	2010	2018
87	John Carey	Republican	Wellston	2010	2018
88	Danny Bubp	Republican	West Union	2004	2012
89	Terry Johnson	Republican	Portsmouth	2010	2018
90	Margaret Ruhl	Republican	Mount Vernon	2008	2016
91	Bill Hayes	Republican	Pataskala	2010	2018
92	Debbie Phillips	Democrat	Athens	2008	2016
93	Andy Thompson	Republican	Marietta	2010	2018
94	Troy Balderson	Republican	Muskingum	2008	2016
95	Lou Gentile	Democrat	Steubenville	2010	2018
96	Al Landis	Republican	Dover	2010	2018
97	Dave Hall	Republican	Killbuck	2008	2016
98	Richard Hollington	Republican	Chagrin Falls	2011 (Appt.)	2020
99	Casey Kozlowski	Republican	Pierpont	2010	2018

== Changes in membership ==
=== Senate ===
District	Predecessor	Reason for change	Successor	Date successor seated
6th	Jon Husted (R)	Husted resigned to become Ohio Secretary of State. Lehner appointed for remainder of term.	Peggy Lehner (R)	January 11, 2011
1st	Steve Buehrer (R)	Buehrer resigned to become director of the Ohio Bureau of Worker's Compensation. Hite appointed for remainder of term.	Cliff Hite (R)	February 1, 2011
22nd	Bob Gibbs (R)	Gibbs resigned after winning an election to become a United States Congressman. Obhof appointed for remainder of term.	Larry Obhof (R)	February 1, 2011
4th	Gary Cates (R)	Resigned May 23, 2011 to become senior vice chancellor within a division of the Ohio Board of Regents. Coley appointed for remainder of term.	Bill Coley (R)	May 24, 2011
20th	Jimmy Stewart (R)	Stewart resigned to work as president of the Ohio Gas Association. Balderson appointed for remainder of term.	Troy Balderson (R)	July 13, 2011
26th	Karen Gillmor (R)	Resigned July 13, 2011 to become chair of the Ohio Industrial Commission. Burke appointed for remainder of term.	David Burke (R)	July 13, 2011
18th	Tim Grendell (R)	Grendell resigned to take a judiciary position. Eklund appointed for remainder of term.	John Eklund (R)	November 8, 2011
30th	Jason Wilson (D)	Wilson resigned to become a member of the Governor's cabinet. Gentile appointed for remainder of term.	Lou Gentile (D)	December 15, 2011
17th	David T. Daniels (R)	Daniels resigned to become a member of the Governor's cabinet. Peterson appointed for remainder of term.	Bob Peterson (R)	March 21, 2012

=== House of Representatives ===
District	Predecessor	Reason for change	Successor	Date successor seated
37th	Peggy Lehner (R)	Lehner resigned after being appointed to the Ohio Senate. Butler appointed for the remainder of the term.	Jim Butler (R)	January 11, 2011
77th	Jim Zehringer (R)	Zehringer resigned after being appointed to the Governor's cabinet. Buchy appointed for the remainder of the term.	Jim Buchy (R)	January 11, 2011
98th	Richard Hollington (R)	Hollington retired. Tim Grendell elected but did not take oath. Hollington reappointed as a placeholder.	Richard Hollington (R)	January 11, 2011
76th	Cliff Hite (R)	Hite resigned after being appointed to the Ohio Senate. Sprague appointed for the remainder of the term.	Robert Sprague (R)	February 2, 2011
50th	Todd Snitchler (R)	Snitchler resigned after being appointed to the Public Utilities Commission. Hagan appointed for the remainder of the term.	Christina Hagan (R)	March 1, 2011
55th	Bill Coley (R)	Coley resigned after being appointed to the Ohio Senate. Conditt appointed for the remainder of the term.	Margaret Conditt (R)	June 8, 2011
83rd	David Burke (R)	Burke resigned after being appointed to the Ohio Senate. Pelanda appointed for the remainder of the term.	Dorothy Liggett Pelanda (R)	July 28, 2011
94th	Troy Balderson (R)	Balderson resigned after being appointed to the Ohio Senate. Hill appointed for the remainder of the term.	Brian Hill (R)	July 28, 2011
30th	Robert Mecklenborg (R)	Mecklenborg resigned after a scandal. Terhar appointed for the remainder of the term.	Louis Terhar (R)	September 14, 2011
43rd	Todd McKenney (R)	McKenney resigned after being appointed to the judiciary. DeVitis appointed for the remainder of the term.	Anthony DeVitis (R)	December 8, 2011
95th	Lou Gentile (D)	Gentile resigned after being appointed to the Ohio Senate. Cera appointed for the remainder of the term.	Jack Cera (D)	December 15, 2011
15th	Timothy J. DeGeeter (D)	DeGeeter resigned after winning election as mayor of Parma, Ohio. Celebrezze appointed for remainder of term.	Nicholas J. Celebrezze (D)	January 16, 2012
87th	John Carey (R)	Carey resigned. Rose appointed as a placeholder.	Philip H. Rose (R)	January 18, 2012
98th	Richard Hollington (R)	Hollington resigned after being elected mayor of Hunting Valley. Matheney appointed as a placeholder.	Mary Brigid Matheney (R)	January 18, 2012
87th	Philip H. Rose (R)	Carey resigned. Smith appointed for the remainder of the term.	Ryan Smith (R)	April 18, 2012
98th	Mary Brigid Matheney (R)	Matheney resigned. Lynch appointed for the remainder of the term.	Matt Lynch (R)	April 18, 2012
85th	Bob Peterson (R)	Peterson resigned after being appointed to the Ohio Senate. Scherer appointed for the remainder of the term.	Gary Scherer (R)	April 24, 2012
41st	Lynn Slaby (R)	Slaby resigned to take a position on the Public Utilities Commission. His wife, Marilyn Slaby is appointed for the remainder of the term.	Marilyn Slaby (R)	May 24, 2012
27th	W. Carlton Weddington (D)	Weddington resigned after a scandal. Boyce appointed for the remainder of the term.	Kevin Boyce (D)	May 6, 2012

== See also ==
- List of Ohio state legislatures
