= 130th Ohio General Assembly =

Term of state legislature in Ohio, US

←	129th	131st	→
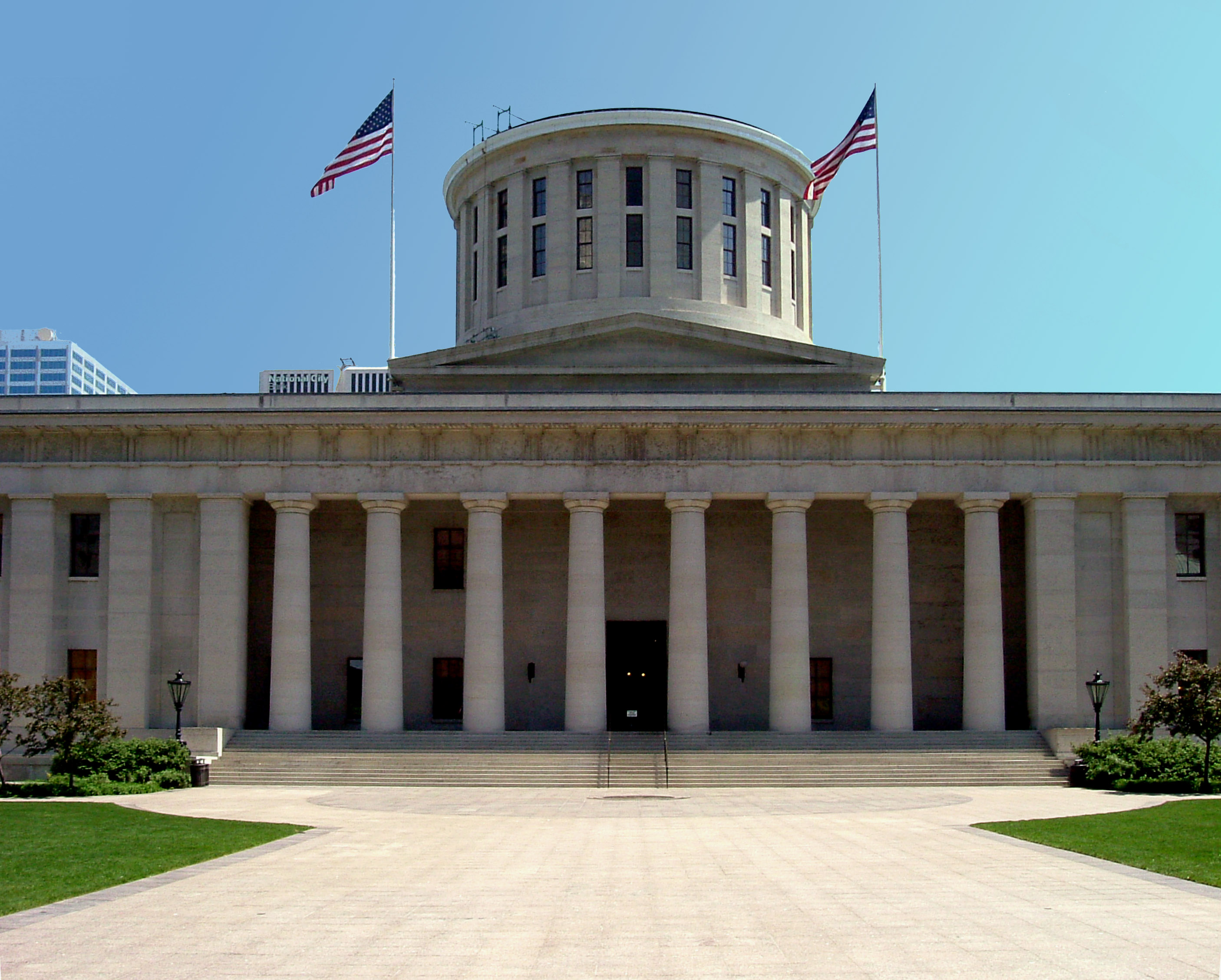
- Ohio Statehouse (2004)

Overview
- Term: January 7, 2013 – December 30, 2014

Ohio Senate
- Senate party standings
- Members: 33 (23 R, 10 D)
- President of the Senate: Keith Faber (R)
- President Pro Tempore: Chris Widener (R)
- Party control: Republican Party

Ohio House of Representatives
- House party standings
- Members: 99 (60 R, 39 D)
- House Speaker: William Batchelder (R)
- Party control: Republican Party

Sessions
- 1st: January 7, 2013 – December 30, 2013
- 2nd: January 2, 2014 – December 30, 2014

The One Hundred Thirtieth Ohio General Assembly was a meeting of the Ohio state legislature, composed of the Ohio State Senate and the Ohio House of Representatives. It convened in Columbus, Ohio on January 7, 2013 and adjourned December 30, 2014. This General Assembly coincided with the last two years of John Kasich's first term as Ohio Governor. The apportionment of legislative districts was based on the 2010 United States census and 2011 redistricting. Both the Ohio Senate and Ohio House of Representatives were retained by the Ohio Republican Party.

== Party summary ==
Resignations and new members are discussed in the "Changes in membership" section, below.

=== Senate ===
	Party (Shading indicates majority caucus)		Total	Vacant
	Republican	Democratic	Total	Vacant
End of previous Assembly	23	10	33	0
Begin	23	10	33	0
Latest voting share	69.7%	30.3%		

=== House of Representatives ===
	Party (Shading indicates majority caucus)		Total	Vacant
	Democratic	Republican	Total	Vacant
End of previous Assembly	40	59	99	0
Begin	39	60	99	0
Latest voting share	39.4%	60.6%		

== Leadership ==
=== Senate ===
- Senate President: Keith Faber
- President Pro Tempore: Chris Widener

Majority (Republican) leadership

- Majority Floor Leader: Tom Patton
- Majority Whip: Larry Obhof

Minority (Democratic) leadership

- Senate Minority Leader: Eric Kearney
- Assistant Minority Leader: Joe Schiavoni
- Minority Whip: Nina Turner
- Assistant Minority Whip: Edna Brown

=== House of Representatives ===
- Speaker of the House: William G. Batchelder
- Speaker Pro Tempore: Matt Huffman

Majority (Republican) leadership

- Majority Floor Leader: Barbara Sears
- Assistant Majority Floor Leader: John Adams
- Majority Whip: Cheryl Grossman
- Assistant Majority Whip: Jim Buchy

Minority (Democratic) leadership

- House Minority Leader: Armond Budish
- Assistant Minority Leader: Matt Szollosi
- Minority Whip: Tracy Maxwell Heard
- Assistant Minority Whip: Debbie Phillips

== Membership ==
=== Senate ===
District	Senator	Party	Residence	First elected	Term limited
1	Cliff Hite	Republican	Findlay	2011 (Appt.)	2022
2	Randy Gardner	Republican	Bowling Green	2012	2020
3	Kevin Bacon	Republican	Columbus	2010	2018
4	Bill Coley	Republican	Middletown	2011 (Appt.)	2020
5	Bill Beagle	Republican	Tipp City	2010	2018
6	Peggy Lehner	Republican	Kettering	2011 (Appt.)	2020
7	Shannon Jones	Republican	Springboro	2009 (Appt.)	2018
8	Bill Seitz	Republican	Cincinnati	2007 (Appt.)	2016
9	Eric Kearney	Democratic	Cincinnati	2005 (Appt.)	2014
10	Chris Widener	Republican	Springfield	2008	2016
11	Edna Brown	Democratic	Toledo	2010	2018
12	Keith Faber	Republican	Celina	2007 (Appt.)	2016
13	Gayle Manning	Republican	North Ridgeville	2010	2018
14	Joe Uecker	Republican	Loveland	2012	2020
15	Charleta Tavares	Democratic	Columbus	2010	2018
16	Jim Hughes	Republican	Columbus	2008	2016
17	Bob Peterson	Republican	Sabina	2012 (Appt.)	2022
18	John Eklund	Republican	Chardon	2011 (Appt.)	2020
19	Kris Jordan	Republican	Powell	2010	2018
20	Troy Balderson	Republican	Zanesville	2011 (Appt.)	2020
21	Vacant	Democratic			
22	Larry Obhof	Republican	Montville Township	2011 (Appt.)	2020
23	Michael J. Skindell	Democratic	Lakewood	2010	2018
24	Tom Patton	Republican	Strongsville	2008 (Appt.)	2016
25	Nina Turner	Democratic	Cleveland	2008 (Appt.)	2018
26	David Burke	Republican	Marysville	2011 (Appt.)	2020
27	Frank LaRose	Republican	Copley Township	2010	2018
28	Tom Sawyer	Democratic	Akron	2007 (Appt.)	2016
29	Scott Oelslager	Republican	North Canton	2010	2018
30	Lou Gentile	Democratic	Steubenville	2011 (Appt.)	2020
31	Tim Schaffer	Republican	Lancaster	2006	2014
32	Capri Cafaro	Democratic	Hubbard	2007 (Appt.)	2016
33	Joe Schiavoni	Democratic	Youngstown	2009 (Appt.)	2018

=== House of Representatives ===
District	Representative	Party	Residence	First elected	Term limited
1	Ron Amstutz	Republican	Wooster	2008	2016
2	Mark Romanchuk	Republican	Mansfield	2012	2020
3	Tim Brown	Republican	Bowling Green	2012	2020
4	Matt Huffman	Republican	Lima	2006	2014
5	Nick Barborak	Democratic	Lisbon	2012	2020
6	Marlene Anielski	Republican	Walton Hills	2010	2018
7	Mike Dovilla	Republican	Berea	2010	2018
8	Armond Budish	Democratic	Beachwood	2006	2014
9	Barbara Boyd	Democratic	Cleveland Heights	2006	2014
10	Bill Patmon	Democratic	Cleveland	2010	2018
11	Sandra Williams	Democratic	Cleveland	2006	2014
12	John E. Barnes, Jr.	Democratic	Cleveland	2010	2018
13	Nickie Antonio	Democratic	Lakewood	2010	2018
14	Michael Foley	Democratic	Cleveland	2006 (Appt.)	2014
15	Nicholas J. Celebrezze	Democratic	Parma	2012 (Appt.)	2020
16	Nan Baker	Republican	Westlake	2008	2016
17	Michael Curtin	Democratic	Columbus	2012	2020
18	Michael Stinziano	Democratic	Columbus	2010	2018
19	Anne Gonzales	Republican	Columbus	2010	2018
20	Heather Bishoff	Democratic	Blacklick	2012	2020
21	Mike Duffey	Republican	Worthington	2010	2018
22	John Patrick Carney	Democratic	Columbus	2008	2016
23	Cheryl Grossman	Republican	Grove City	2008	2016
24	Stephanie Kunze	Republican	Hilliard	2012	2020
25	Kevin Boyce	Democratic	Columbus	2012 (Appt.)	2020
26	Tracy Maxwell Heard	Democratic	Columbus	2006	2014
27	Peter Stautberg	Republican	Cincinnati	2008	2016
28	Connie Pillich	Democratic	Cincinnati	2008	2016
29	Louis Blessing	Republican	Cincinnati	2012	2020
30	Louis Terhar	Republican	Cincinnati	2011 (Appt.)	2020
31	Denise Driehaus	Democratic	Cincinnati	2008	2016
32	Dale Mallory	Democratic	Cincinnati	2006	2014
33	Alicia Reece	Democratic	Cincinnati	2010 (Appt.)	2018
34	Vernon Sykes	Democratic	Akron	2006	2014
35	Zack Milkovich	Democratic	Akron	2010	2018
36	Anthony DeVitis	Republican	Green	2011 (Appt.)	2020
37	Kristina Roegner	Republican	Hudson	2010	2018
38	Marilyn Slaby	Republican	Copley Twp.	2012 (Appt.)	2020
39	Fred Strahorn	Democratic	Dayton	2012	2020
40	Michael Henne	Republican	Clayton	2010	2018
41	Jim Butler	Republican	Oakwood	2011 (Appt.)	2020
42	Niraj Antani	Republican	Miamisburg	2014 (Appt.)	2022
43	Roland Winburn	Democratic	Dayton	2008	2016
44	Michael Ashford	Democratic	Toledo	2010	2018
45	Teresa Fedor	Democratic	Toledo	2010	2018
46	Michael Sheehy	Democratic	Oregon	2013 (Appt.)	2020
47	Barbara Sears	Republican	Sylvania	2008 (Appt.)	2016
48	Kirk Schuring	Republican	Canton	2010	2018
49	Stephen Slesnick	Democratic	Canton	2008 (Appt.)	2016
50	Christina Hagan	Republican	Uniontown	2011 (Appt.)	2020
51	Wes Retherford	Republican	Hamilton	2012	2020
52	Margaret Conditt	Republican	Liberty Township	2011 (Appt.)	2020
53	Timothy Derickson	Republican	Oxford	2008	2016
54	Vacant	Republican			
55	Matt Lundy	Democratic	Elyria	2006	2014
56	Dan Ramos	Democratic	Lorain	2010	2018
57	Terry Boose	Republican	Norwalk	2008	2016
58	Bob Hagan	Democratic	Youngstown	2006	2014
59	Ron Gerberry	Democratic	Austintown	2007 (Appt.)	2016
60	John Rogers	Democratic	Mentor-on-the-Lake	2012	2020
61	Ron Young	Republican	Painesville	2010	2018
62	Ron Maag	Republican	Lebanon	2008	2016
63	Sean O'Brien	Democratic	Niles	2010	2018
64	Tom Letson	Democratic	Warren	2006	2014
65	John Becker	Republican	Union Twp.	2012	2020
66	Doug Green	Republican	Mt. Orab	2012	2020
67	Andrew Brenner	Republican	Powell	2010	2018
68	Margaret Ruhl	Republican	Mount Vernon	2008	2016
69	William G. Batchelder	Republican	Medina	2006	2014
70	Dave Hall	Republican	Killbuck	2008	2016
71	Jay Hottinger	Republican	Newark	2006	2014
72	Bill Hayes	Republican	Harrison Twp.	2010	2018
73	Rick Perales	Republican	Beavercreek	2012	2020
74	Bob Hackett	Republican	London	2008	2016
75	Kathleen Clyde	Democratic	Kent	2010	2018
76	Matt Lynch	Republican	Bainbridge Twp.	2012 (Appt.)	2020
77	Gerald Stebelton	Republican	Lancaster	2006	2014
78	Ron Hood	Republican	Ashville	2012	2020
79	Ross McGregor	Republican	Springfield	2005 (Appt.)	2014
80	Richard Adams	Republican	Troy	2008	2016
81	Lynn Wachtmann	Republican	Napoleon	2006	2014
82	Tony Burkley	Republican	Paulding	2012	2020
83	Robert Sprague	Republican	Findlay	2011 (Appt.)	2020
84	Jim Buchy	Republican	Greenville	2011 (Appt.)	2020
85	John Adams	Republican	Sidney	2006	2014
86	Dorothy Liggett Pelanda	Republican	Marysville	2011 (Appt.)	2020
87	Jeffrey McClain	Republican	Upper Sandusky	2008	2016
88	Rex Damschroder	Republican	Fremont	2010	2018
89	Chris Redfern	Democratic	Port Clinton	2012	2020
90	Terry Johnson	Republican	McDermott	2010	2018
91	Cliff Rosenberger	Republican	Clarksville	2010	2018
92	Gary Scherer	Republican	Circleville	2012 (Appt.)	2020
93	Ryan Smith	Republican	Bidwell	2012 (Appt.)	2020
94	Debbie Phillips	Democratic	Athens	2008	2016
95	Andy Thompson	Republican	Marietta	2010	2018
96	Jack Cera	Democratic	Bellaire	2011 (Appt.)	2020
97	Brian Hill	Republican	Zanesville	2011 (Appt.)	2020
98	Al Landis	Republican	Dover	2010	2018
99	John Patterson	Democratic	Jefferson	2012	2020

== Changes in membership ==
=== Senate ===
District	Predecessor	Reason for change	Successor	Date successor seated
21st	Shirley Smith (D)	Resigned November 30, 2014.		

=== House of Representatives ===
District	Predecessor	Reason for change	Successor	Date successor seated
46th	Matt Szollosi (D)	Resigned May 31, 2013 to become executive director of Affiliated Construction Trades of Ohio. Successor was appointed June 26, 2013 to finish the term ending with this General Assembly.	Michael Sheehy (D)	June 26, 2013
42nd	Terry Blair (R)	Died June 26, 2014.	Niraj Antani (R)	December 2, 2014
54th	Peter Beck (R)	Resigned November 30, 2014 due to felony charges.		

== Committees ==
Listed alphabetically by chamber, including Chairperson and Ranking Member.

=== Senate ===
Source: "State of Ohio 130th General Assembly Senate Standing Committees" (January 2014)

- Agriculture— Chair: Cliff Hite, Ranking: Lou Gentile
- Civil Justice— Chair: Bill Coley, Ranking: Michael J. Skindell
- Commerce and Labor— Chair: Kevin Bacon, Ranking: Edna Brown
- Criminal Justice— Chair: John Eklund, Ranking: Eric Kearney
- Education— Chair: Peggy Lehner, Ranking: Tom Sawyer
- Energy and Natural Resources— Chair: Troy Balderson, Ranking: Lou Gentile
- Finance— Chair: Scott Oelslager, Ranking: Tom Sawyer
  - Education— Chair: Randy Gardner, Ranking: Nina Turner
  - General Government— Chair: Bob Peterson, Ranking: Eric Kearney
  - Medicaid— Chair: David Burke, Ranking: Capri Cafaro
- Insurance and Financial Institutions— Chair: Jim Hughes, Ranking: Nina Turner
- Medicaid, Health and Human Services— Chair: Shannon Jones, Ranking: Capri Cafaro
- Public Safety, Local Government and Veterans Affairs— Chair: Frank LaRose, Ranking: Michael J. Skindell
- Public Utilities— Chair: Bill Seitz, Ranking: Eric Kearney
- Reference— Chair: Kris Jordan, Ranking: Joe Schiavoni
- Rules— Chair: Keith Faber, Ranking: Joe Schiavoni
- State Government Oversight and Reform— Chair: David Burke, Ranking: Shirley Smith
- Transportation— Chair: Gayle Manning, Ranking: Capri Cafaro
- Ways and Means— Chair: Tim Schaffer, Ranking: Charleta Tavares
  - Tax Reform— Chair: Bob Peterson, Ranking: Charleta Tavares
- Workforce and Economic Development— Chair: Bill Beagle, Ranking: Charleta Tavares

=== House of Representatives ===
Source: "Standing Committees Of The Ohio House Of Representatives 130th General Assembly" (August 2014)

- Agriculture and Natural Resources— Chair: Dave Hall, Ranking: Jack Cera
- Commerce, Labor, and Technology— Chair: Ron Young, Ranking: Bob Hagan
- Economic Development and Regulatory Reform— Chair: Nan Baker, Ranking: Denise Driehaus
- Education— Chair: Gerald Stebelton, Ranking: Teresa Fedor
- Finance and Appropriations— Chair: Ron Amstutz, Ranking: Vernon Sykes
  - Agriculture and Development— Chair: Timothy Derickson, Ranking: Michael Ashford
  - Health and Human Services— Chair: Anne Gonzales, Ranking: Michael Foley
  - Higher Education— Chair: Cliff Rosenberger, Ranking: Dan Ramos
  - Primary and Secondary Education— Chair: Bill Hayes, Ranking: Matt Lundy
  - Transportation— Chair: Ross McGregor, Ranking: Alicia Reece
- Financial Institutions, Housing, and Urban Development— Chair: Richard Adams, Ranking: Kevin Boyce
- Health and Aging— Chair: Lynn Wachtmann, Ranking: Nickie Antonio
  - Opiate Addiction Treatment and Reform— Chair: vacant, Ranking: vacant
- Higher Education Reform Study Committee— Chair: Cliff Rosenberger, Ranking: Dan Ramos
- Insurance— Chair: Bob Hackett, Ranking: John Patrick Carney
- Judiciary— Chair: Jim Butler, Ranking: Michael Stinziano
- Manufacturing and Workforce Development— Chair: Kirk Schuring, Ranking: Roland Winburn
- Military and Veterans Affairs— Chair: Terry Johnson, Ranking: Connie Pillich
- Policy and Legislative Oversight— Chair: Mike Dovilla, Ranking: Ron Gerberry
- Public Utilities— Chair: Peter Stautberg, Ranking: Sandra Williams
- Rules and Reference— Chair: Matt Huffman, Ranking: Tracy Maxwell Heard
- State and Local Government— Chair: vacant, Ranking: Kathleen Clyde
  - Shared Services and Government Efficiency— Chair: Ron Maag, Ranking: Stephen Slesnick
- Transportation, Public Safety, and Homeland Security— Chair: Rex Damschroder, Ranking: Dale Mallory
- Unemployment Compensation Debt Study Committee— Chair: Barbara Sears, Ranking: vacant
- Ways and Means— Chair: Jeffrey McClain, Ranking: Tom Letson

=== Joint committees ===
- Correctional Institution Inspection Committee— Chair: Sen. Shirley Smith (D)
- Joint Committee on Agency Rule Review— Chair: Sen. Bob Peterson (R), Vice-Chair: Rep. Ross McGregor (R)
- Joint Legislative Ethics Committee— Chair: Sen. Keith Faber (R), Vice-Chair: Rep. William G. Batchelder (R)
- Legislative Service Commission— Chair: Sen. Keith Faber (R), Vice-Chair: Rep. William G. Batchelder (R)
- State Controlling Board

== Administrative officers ==
=== Senate ===
- Chief of Staff: Jason Mauk
- Minority Chief of Staff: Ernie Davis
- Senate Clerk: Vincent Keeran
- Sergeant-at-Arms: Ken Mumper

=== House of Representatives ===
- Chief of Staff: Chad Hawley
- Chief Administrative Officer: Kim Flasher
- Minority Chief of Staff: Keary McCarthy
- Clerk of the House of Representatives: Brad Young
- Sergeant-at-Arms: Richard Collins

== See also ==
- List of Ohio state legislatures
