= Ohio House of Representatives, 127th General Assembly =

The 127th General Assembly comprised the state legislature of the U.S. state of Ohio. The House of Representatives is the lower house of the Ohio General Assembly. Every two years, all of the house seats come up for election. The 127th General Assembly was in session in 2007 and 2008. The party distribution was 53 Republicans and 46 Democrats.

== Make-up of Ohio House of Representatives for the 127th General Assembly ==
Results of the November 7, 2006 Election:

Affiliation	Members
Republican Party	53
Democratic Party	46
Total	99
Majority	7

== Leadership ==
=== Majority Leadership ===
Office	Name	Party	District
Speaker	Jon Husted	Republican	37
Speaker Pro Tempore	Kevin DeWine	Republican	70
Majority Leader	Larry L. Flowers	Republican	19
Assistant Majority Leader	Jim Carmichael	Republican	3
Majority Whip	Michelle G. Schneider	Republican	35
Assistant Majority Whip	Shannon Jones	Republican	67

=== Minority Leadership ===
Office	Name	Party	District
Minority Leader	Joyce Beatty	Democratic	27
Assistant Minority Leader	Todd Book	Democratic	89
Minority Whip	Steve Driehaus	Democratic	31
Assistant Minority Whip	Fred Strahorn	Democratic	40

== Members of the Ohio House of Representatives ==
District	Representative	Party	Residence	First elected	Term limited
1	Linda Bolon	Democratic	East Palestine	2006	2014
2	Jon Peterson	Republican	Delaware	1999 (App)	2008
3	Jim Carmichael	Republican	Wooster	2000	2008
4	Matt Huffman	Republican	Lima	2006	2014
5	Gerald Stebelton	Republican	Lancaster	2006	2014
6	Randy Gardner	Republican	Bowling Green	2008 (app)	2014
7	Kenny Yuko	Democratic	Richmond Heights	2004	2012
8	Armond Budish	Democratic	Beachwood	2006	2014
9	Barbara Boyd	Democratic	Cleveland Heights	2006	2014
10	Eugene Miller	Democratic	Cleveland	2006	2014
11	Sandra Williams	Democratic	Cleveland	2006	2014
12	Michael DeBose	Democratic	Cleveland	2002 (App)	2010
13	Michael J. Skindell	Democratic	Lakewood	2002	2010
14	Michael Foley	Democratic	Cleveland	2006 (App)	2014
15	Timothy J. DeGeeter	Democratic	Parma	2003 (App)	2012
16	Jennifer Brady	Democratic	Westlake	2006	2014
17	Josh Mandel	Republican	Lyndhurst	2006	2014
18	Tom Patton	Republican	Strongsville	2002	2010
19	Larry L. Flowers	Republican	Canal Winchester	2000	2008
20	Jim McGregor	Republican	Gahanna	2001 (App)	2010
21	Kevin Bacon	Republican	Columbus	2006	2014
22	Jim Hughes	Republican	Columbus	2000	2008
23	Larry Wolpert	Republican	Hilliard	2000	2008
24	Ted Celeste	Democratic	Upper Arlington	2006	2014
25	Dan Stewart	Democratic	Columbus	2002	2010
26	Tracy Maxwell Heard	Democratic	Columbus	2006	2014
27	Joyce Beatty	Democratic	Columbus	2000 (App)	2008
28	Jim Raussen	Republican	Springdale	2002	2010
29	Lou Blessing	Republican	Cincinnati	2004	2012
30	Robert Mecklenborg	Republican	Cincinnati	2007 (App)	2016
31	Steve Driehaus	Democratic	Cincinnati	2000	2008
32	Dale Mallory	Democratic	Cincinnati	2006	2014
33	Tyrone Yates	Democratic	Cincinnati	2002	2010
34	Tom Brinkman Jr.	Republican	Cincinnati	2000	2008
35	Michelle G. Schneider	Republican	Cincinnati	2000	2008
36	Arlene Setzer	Republican	Vandalia	2000	2008
37	Jon Husted	Republican	Kettering	2000	2008
38	John White	Republican	Kettering	2000	2008
39	Clayton Luckie	Democratic	Dayton	2006 (App)	2014
40	Fred Strahorn	Democratic	Dayton	2000	2008
41	Brian Williams	Democratic	Akron	2004	2012
42	John Widowfield	Republican	Cuyahoga Falls	2001 (App)	2010
43	Steve Dyer	Democratic	Green	2006	2014
44	Vernon Sykes	Democratic	Akron	2006	2014
45	Vacant				
46	Mark Wagoner	Republican	Toledo	2004	2012
47	Peter Ujvagi	Democratic	Toledo	2002	2010
48	Edna Brown	Democratic	Toledo	2001 (App)	2008
49	Matt Szollosi	Democratic	Toledo	2006	2014
50	John Hagan	Republican	Marlboro Twp.	2000	2008
51	Scott Oelslager	Republican	Canton	2002	2010
52	Vacant				
53	Shawn Webster	Republican	Millville	2000	2008
54	Courtney Combs	Republican	Hamilton	2004 (App)	2012
55	Bill Coley	Republican	West Chester Twp.	2004	2012
56	Joseph Koziura	Democratic	Lorain	2000	2008
57	Matt Lundy	Democratic	Elyria	2006	2014
58	Tom Heydinger	Democratic	Norwalk	2008 (App)	2016
59	Ron Gerberry	Democratic	Austintown	2007 (Appt.)	2016
60	Bob Hagan	Democratic	Youngstown	2006	2014
61	Mark Okey	Democratic	Carrollton	2006	2014
62	Lorraine Fende	Democratic	Willowick	2004	2012
63	Carol-Ann Schindel	Republican	LeRoy	2006	2014
64	Tom Letson	Democratic	Warren	2006	2014
65	Sandra Harwood	Democratic	Niles	2002	2010
66	Joe Uecker	Republican	Loveland	2004	2012
67	Shannon Jones	Republican	Deerfield Township	2006	2014
68	Kathleen Chandler	Democratic	Kent	2002	2010
69	William G. Batchelder	Republican	Medina	2006	2014
70	Kevin DeWine	Republican	Fairborn	2000	2008
71	Jay Hottinger	Republican	Newark	2006	2014
72	Ross McGregor	Republican	Springfield	2005 (App)	2014
73	Jay Goyal	Democratic	Mansfield	2006	2014
74	Bruce Goodwin	Republican	Defiance	2006	2014
75	Lynn Wachtman	Republican	Napoleon	2006	2014
76	Cliff Hite	Republican	Findlay	2006	2014
77	Jim Zehringer	Republican	Fort Recovery	2007 (App)	2016
78	John Adams	Republican	Sidney	2006	2014
79	Diana M. Fessler	Republican	New Carlisle	2000	2008
80	Chris Redfern	Democratic	Port Clinton	2000	2008
81	Jeff Wagner	Republican	Sycamore	2002	2010
82	Steve Reinhard	Republican	Bucyrus	2000	2008
83	Anthony Core	Republican	Rushsylvania	2000	2008
84	Chris Widener	Republican	Springfield	2002	2010
85	John M. Schlichter	Republican	Washington Court House	2002	2010
86	David T. Daniels	Republican	Greenfield	2002	2010
87	Clyde Evans	Republican	Rio Grande	2002	2010
88	Danny Bubp	Republican	West Union	2004	2012
89	Todd Book	Democratic	McDermott	2002	2010
90	Thom Collier	Republican	Mount Vernon	2000 (App)	2008
91	Dan Dodd	Democratic	Hebron	2006	2014
92	Jimmy Stewart	Republican	Athens	2002	2010
93	Jennifer Garrison	Democratic	Marietta	2004	2012
94	James Aslanides	Republican	Coshocton	2000	2008
95	John Domenick	Democratic	Smithfield	2002	2010
96	Allan R. Sayre	Democratic	Dover	2004	2012
97	Bob Gibbs	Republican	Lakeville	2002	2010
98	Matthew J. Dolan	Republican	Novelty	2004	2012
99	Deborah Newcomb	Democratic	Conneaut	2008 (Appt.)	2016

App- Member was appointed to current House Seat

== See also ==
- Politics of Ohio
