= 131st Ohio General Assembly =

Term of state legislature in Ohio, US

←	130th	132nd	→
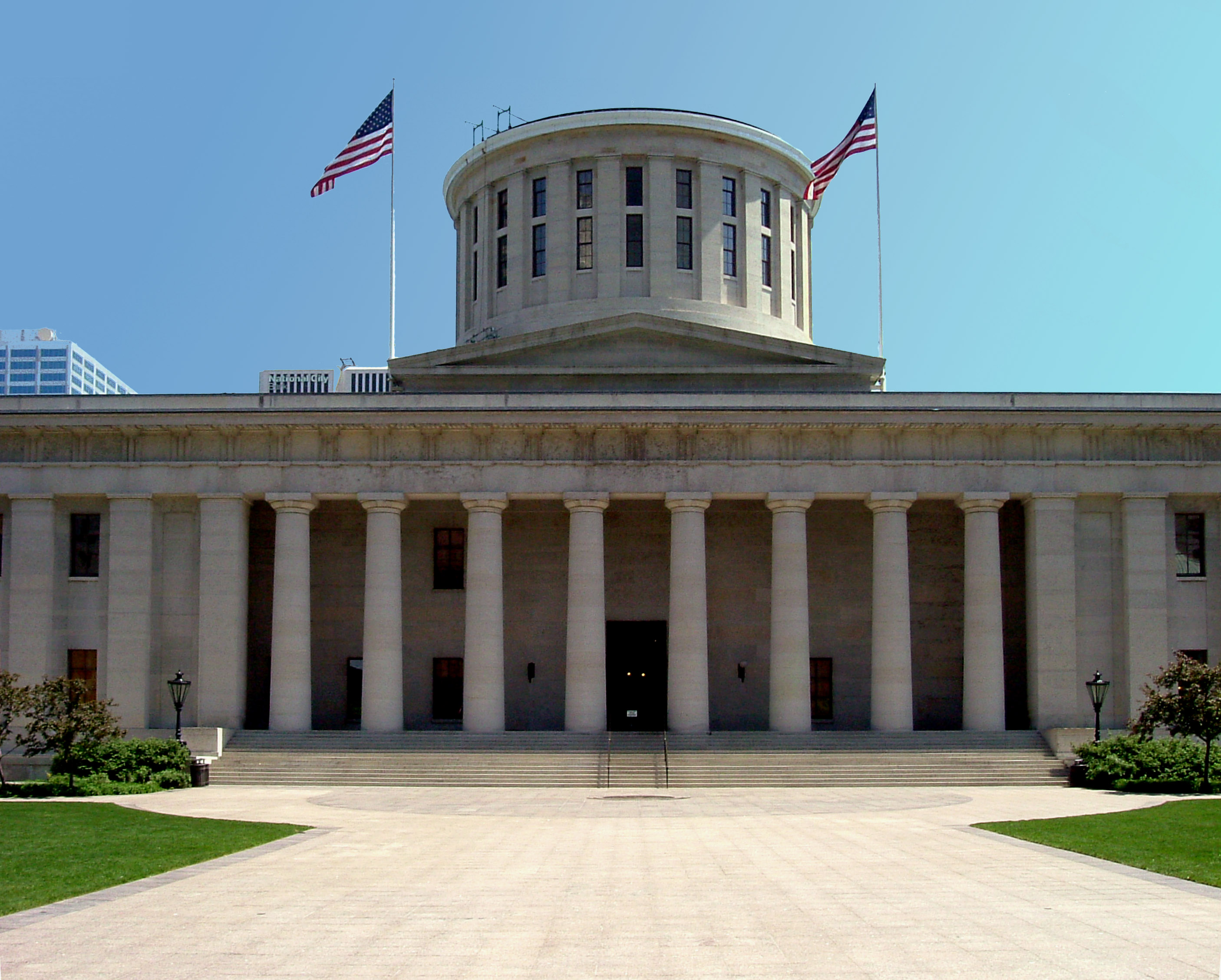
- Ohio Statehouse (2004)

Overview
- Term: January 5, 2015 – January 2, 2017

Ohio Senate
- Senate party standings
- Members: 33 (23 R, 10 D)
- President of the Senate: Keith Faber (R)
- President Pro Tempore: Larry Obhof (R)
- Party control: Republican Party

Ohio House of Representatives
- House party standings
- Members: 99 (65 R, 34 D)
- House Speaker: Cliff Rosenberger (R)
- Party control: Republican Party

Sessions
- 1st: January 5, 2015 – TBD

The One Hundred Thirty-first Ohio General Assembly was a meeting of the Ohio state legislature, composed of the Ohio State Senate and the Ohio House of Representatives. It convened in Columbus, Ohio on January 5, 2015 and is scheduled to adjourn January 2, 2017. The apportionment of legislative districts is based on the 2010 United States census and 2011 redistricting plan. Both the Ohio Senate and Ohio House of Representatives were retained by the Ohio Republican Party.

== Party summary ==
Resignations and new members are discussed in the "Changes in membership" section, below.

=== Senate ===
	Party (Shading indicates majority caucus)		Total	Vacant
	Republican	Democratic	Total	Vacant
End of previous Assembly	23	10	33	0
Begin (January 3, 2015)	23	10	33	0
Latest voting share	69.7%	30.3%		

=== House of Representatives ===
	Party (Shading indicates majority caucus)		Total	Vacant
	Democratic	Republican	Total	Vacant
End of previous Assembly	39	60	99	0
Begin (January 3, 2015)	34	65	99	0
Latest voting share	39.4%	60.6%		

== Leadership ==
=== Senate ===
- Senate President: Keith Faber
- President Pro Tempore: Larry Obhof

Majority (Republican) leadership

- Majority Floor Leader: Tom Patton
- Majority Whip: Gayle Manning

Minority (Democratic) leadership

- Senate Minority Leader: Joe Schiavoni
- Assistant Minority Leader: Charleta Tavares
- Minority Whip: Edna Brown
- Assistant Minority Whip: Lou Gentile

=== House of Representatives ===
- Speaker of the House: Cliff Rosenberger
- Speaker Pro Tempore: Ron Amstutz

Majority (Republican) leadership

- Majority Floor Leader: Kirk Schuring
- Assistant Majority Floor Leader: Jim Buchy
- Majority Whip: Dorothy Pelanda
- Assistant Majority Whip: Sarah LaTourette

Minority (Democratic) leadership

- House Minority Leader: Fred Strahorn
- Assistant Minority Leader: Nicholas J. Celebrezze
- Minority Whip: Nickie Antonio
- Assistant Minority Whip: Jack Cera

== Membership ==
=== Senate ===
District	Senator	Party	Residence	First elected	Term limited
1	Cliff Hite	Republican	Liberty Township	2011 (Appt.)	2022
2	Randy Gardner	Republican	Bowling Green	2012	2020
3	Kevin Bacon	Republican	Minerva Park	2010	2018
4	Bill Coley	Republican	Liberty Township	2011 (Appt.)	2020
5	Bill Beagle	Republican	Tipp City	2010	2018
6	Peggy Lehner	Republican	Kettering	2011 (Appt.)	2020
7	Steve Wilson	Republican	Maineville	2017 (Appt.)	2026
8	Bill Seitz	Republican	Green Township	2007 (Appt.)	2016
9	Cecil Thomas	Democratic	Cincinnati	2014	2022
10	Bob Hackett	Republican	London	2016 (Appt.)	2024
11	Edna Brown	Democratic	Toledo	2010	2018
12	Keith Faber	Republican	Jefferson Township	2007 (Appt.)	2016
13	Gayle Manning	Republican	North Ridgeville	2010	2018
14	Joe Uecker	Republican	Miami Township	2012	2020
15	Charleta Tavares	Democratic	Columbus	2010	2018
16	Jim Hughes	Republican	Columbus	2008	2016
17	Bob Peterson	Republican	Jasper Township	2012 (Appt.)	2022
18	John Eklund	Republican	Munson Township	2011 (Appt.)	2020
19	Kris Jordan	Republican	Scioto Township	2010	2018
20	Troy Balderson	Republican	Falls Township	2011 (Appt.)	2020
21	Sandra Williams	Democratic	Cleveland	2014	2022
22	Larry Obhof	Republican	Montville Township	2011 (Appt.)	2020
23	Michael J. Skindell	Democratic	Lakewood	2010	2018
24	Tom Patton	Republican	Strongsville	2008 (Appt.)	2016
25	Kenny Yuko	Democratic	Richmond Heights	2014	2022
26	David Burke	Republican	Marysville	2011 (Appt.)	2020
27	Frank LaRose	Republican	Copley Township	2010	2018
28	Tom Sawyer	Democratic	Akron	2007 (Appt.)	2016
29	Scott Oelslager	Republican	North Canton	2010	2018
30	Lou Gentile	Democratic	Steubenville	2011 (Appt.)	2020
31	Jay Hottinger	Republican	Newark	2014	2022
32	Capri Cafaro	Democratic	Liberty Township	2007 (Appt.)	2016
33	Joe Schiavoni	Democratic	Boardman	2009 (Appt.)	2018

=== House of Representatives ===
District	Representative	Party	Residence	First elected	Term limited
1	Ron Amstutz	Republican	Wooster	2008	2016
2	Mark Romanchuk	Republican	Ontario	2012	2020
3	Theresa Gavarone	Republican	Bowling Green	2016 (Appt.)	2024
4	Robert Cupp	Republican	Shawnee Township	2014	2022
5	Tim Ginter	Republican	Salem	2014	2022
6	Marlene Anielski	Republican	Walton Hills	2010	2018
7	Mike Dovilla	Republican	Berea	2010	2018
8	Kent Smith	Democratic	Euclid	2014	2022
9	Janine Boyd	Democratic	Cleveland Heights	2014	2022
10	Bill Patmon	Democratic	Cleveland	2010	2018
11	Stephanie Howse	Democratic	Cleveland	2014	2022
12	John E. Barnes, Jr.	Democratic	Cleveland	2010	2018
13	Nickie Antonio	Democratic	Lakewood	2010	2018
14	Martin Sweeney	Democratic	Cleveland	2014	2022
15	Nicholas J. Celebrezze	Democratic	Parma	2012 (Appt.)	2020
16	Nan Baker	Republican	Westlake	2008	2016
17	Michael Curtin	Democratic	Marble Cliff	2012	2020
18	Kristin Boggs	Democratic	Columbus	2016 (Appt.)	2024
19	Anne Gonzales	Republican	Westerville	2010	2018
20	Heather Bishoff	Democratic	Jefferson Township	2012	2020
21	Mike Duffey	Republican	Worthington	2010	2018
22	David Leland	Democratic	Columbus	2014	2022
23	Cheryl Grossman	Republican	Grove City	2008	2016
24	Stephanie Kunze	Republican	Hilliard	2012	2020
25	Kevin Boyce	Democratic	Columbus	2012 (Appt.)	2020
26	Hearcel Craig	Democratic	Columbus	2014	2022
27	Tom Brinkman	Republican	Cincinnati	2014	2022
28	Jonathan Dever	Republican	Madeira	2014	2022
29	Louis Blessing	Republican	Colerain Township	2012	2020
30	Louis Terhar	Republican	Green Township	2011 (Appt.)	2020
31	Denise Driehaus	Democratic	Cincinnati	2008	2016
32	Christie Bryant	Democratic	Cincinnati	2014	2022
33	Alicia Reece	Democratic	Cincinnati	2010 (Appt.)	2018
34	Emilia Sykes	Democratic	Akron	2014	2022
35	Greta Johnson	Democratic	Akron	2014	2022
36	Anthony DeVitis	Republican	Green	2011 (Appt.)	2020
37	Kristina Roegner	Republican	Hudson	2010	2018
38	Marilyn Slaby	Republican	Copley Township	2012 (Appt.)	2020
39	Fred Strahorn	Democratic	Dayton	2012	2020
40	Michael Henne	Republican	Clayton	2010	2018
41	Jim Butler	Republican	Oakwood	2011 (Appt.)	2020
42	Niraj Antani	Republican	Miamisburg	2014 (Appt.)	2022
43	Jeff Rezabek	Republican	Clayton	2014	2022
44	Michael Ashford	Democratic	Toledo	2010	2018
45	Teresa Fedor	Democratic	Toledo	2010	2018
46	Michael Sheehy	Democratic	Oregon	2013 (Appt.)	2020
47	Derek Merrin	Republican	Waterville	2016 (Appt.)	2024
48	Kirk Schuring	Republican	Jackson Township	2010	2018
49	Stephen Slesnick	Democratic	Canton	2008 (Appt.)	2016
50	Christina Hagan	Republican	Marlboro Township	2011 (Appt.)	2020
51	Wes Retherford	Republican	Hamilton	2012	2020
52	Margaret Conditt	Republican	Liberty Township	2011 (Appt.)	2020
53	Candice Keller	Republican	Middletown	2016 (Appt.)	2024
54	Paul Zeltwanger	Republican	Mason	2014	2022
55	Nathan Manning	Republican	North Ridgeville	2014	2022
56	Dan Ramos	Democratic	Lorain	2010	2018
57	Terry Boose	Republican	Norwalk Township	2008	2016
58	Michele Lepore-Hagan	Democratic	Youngstown	2014	2022
59	John Boccieri	Democratic	Poland	2015 (Appt.)	2024
60	John Rogers	Democratic	Mentor-on-the-Lake	2012	2020
61	Ron Young	Republican	Leroy Township	2010	2018
62	Ron Maag	Republican	Salem Township	2008	2016
63	Sean O'Brien	Democratic	Bazetta Township	2010	2018
64	Michael O'Brien	Democratic	Warren	2014	2022
65	John Becker	Republican	Union Township	2012	2020
66	Doug Green	Republican	Russellville	2012	2020
67	Andrew Brenner	Republican	Powell	2010	2018
68	Margaret Ruhl	Republican	Mount Vernon	2008	2016
69	Steve Hambley	Republican	Brunswick	2014	2022
70	Dave Hall	Republican	Millersburg	2008	2016
71	Scott Ryan	Republican	Granville Township	2014	2022
72	Bill Hayes	Republican	Harrison Township	2010	2018
73	Rick Perales	Republican	Beavercreek	2012	2020
74	Bill Dean	Republican	Xenia	2016 (Appt.)	2024
75	Kathleen Clyde	Democratic	Kent	2010	2018
76	Sarah LaTourette	Republican	Chagrin Falls	2014	2022
77	Tim Schaffer	Republican	Lancaster	2014	2022
78	Ron Hood	Republican	Walnut Township	2012	2020
79	Kyle Koehler	Republican	German Township	2014	2022
80	Steve Huffman	Republican	Tipp City	2014	2022
81	Rob McColley	Republican	Napoleon	2014	2022
82	Tony Burkley	Republican	Benton Township	2012	2020
83	Robert Sprague	Republican	Findlay	2011 (Appt.)	2020
84	Jim Buchy	Republican	Greenville	2011 (Appt.)	2020
85	Nino Vitale	Republican	Union Township	2014	2022
86	Dorothy Liggett Pelanda	Republican	Allen Township	2011 (Appt.)	2020
87	Wesley Goodman	Republican	Cardington	2016 (Appt.)	2024
88	Bill Reineke	Republican	Eden Township	2014	2022
89	Steve Arndt	Republican	Port Clinton	2015 (Appt.)	2024
90	Terry Johnson	Republican	Rush Township	2010	2018
91	Cliff Rosenberger	Republican	Vernon Township	2010	2018
92	Gary Scherer	Republican	Jackson Township	2012 (Appt.)	2020
93	Ryan Smith	Republican	Green Township	2012 (Appt.)	2020
94	Debbie Phillips	Democratic	Lee Township	2008	2016
95	Andy Thompson	Republican	Marietta	2010	2018
96	Jack Cera	Democratic	Pultney Township	2011 (Appt.)	2020
97	Brian Hill	Republican	Hopewell Township	2011 (Appt.)	2020
98	Al Landis	Republican	Dover Township	2010	2018
99	John Patterson	Democratic	Jefferson	2012	2020

== See also ==
- List of Ohio state legislatures
