= Heartbeat bill =

Legislation intending to ban abortions after the conceptus' heartbeat can be detected

A six-week abortion ban, also called a "fetal heartbeat bill" by proponents, is a law in the United States which makes abortion illegal as early as six weeks gestational age (two weeks after a woman's first missed period), which is when proponents claim that a "fetal heartbeat" can be detected. Many medical and reproductive health experts, including the American Medical Association and the American College of Obstetricians and Gynecologists (ACOG), say that the reference to a fetal heartbeat is medically inaccurate and misleading. They note that a conceptus is not considered a fetus until eight weeks after fertilization, and that at four weeks after fertilization the embryo only has a simple tubelike structure that will later develop into a heart. ACOG states that a "true fetal heartbeat" cannot be detected until around 17 to 20 weeks of gestation when the chambers of the heart have become sufficiently developed.

Janet Porter, an anti-abortion activist from Ohio, is considered to be the person that first authored this type of legislation. Efforts to introduce her model law succeeded in passing through political branches of government in about a dozen states but in most cases the courts struck down or blocked similar legislation; however, the Texas Heartbeat Act and analogues subsequently adopted in other states succeeded due to a unique enforcement mechanism that makes challenging the law extremely difficult, and which was upheld by the Supreme Court. In some states, the heartbeat bills' effect (whether blocked or not) has been minimized by more stringent total abortion bans that were announced following the decision in Dobbs v. Jackson Women's Health Organization; in other states, such as Ohio, South Carolina and Tennessee, judges lifted the injunctions against the previously passed laws.

Porter's anti-abortion group argues that a heartbeat "is the universally recognized indicator of life." Reproductive rights advocates, on the other hand, say that these bans are de facto complete abortion bans, since many women do not even know that they are pregnant six weeks after their last menstruation, which is on average (with a regular cycle) four weeks post-fertilization and three weeks post-implantation.

As of April 2026 5 states currently have a six-week abortion ban: Florida, Wyoming, Georgia, South Carolina, and Iowa.

== Background ==
The heartbeat bills are based on model legislation created by Faith2Action, a conservative Christian ministry from Ohio advocating for abortion restrictions. Its founder and leader, Janet Porter, said that she was frustrated by what she saw was slow progress in banning pregnancy termination around the United States. The activist thus authored the Ohio House Bill 493 in 2011, and arranged for heart-shaped balloons and fetuses' "testimony" in the legislature, but the bill failed to get out of the Senate because the lawmakers feared the bill was unconstitutional. Her efforts were not considered mainstream at the time, and the Ohio Right to Life, an anti-abortion group which previously employed Porter, opposed such legislation. While that proposal failed, a flurry of copycat legislation was proposed in several other states, which has not abated since then.

In 2013, North Dakota became the first state to pass legislation banning abortions after six weeks. In 2015, the law was ruled unconstitutional under the precedent set by the U.S. Supreme Court decision Roe v. Wade (1973). Eleven states have proposed bills for six-week abortion bans since 2018; since 2019, such bills have passed including bills in Ohio, Georgia, Louisiana, Missouri, Alabama, Kentucky, South Carolina, and Texas, most of which lie either partly or entirely in the Bible Belt. Utah and Arkansas voted to limit the procedure to the middle of the second trimester. As of June 2021, except for the Texas bill, none of the laws were in effect due to court intervention. The Guttmacher Institute writes that "state policymakers are testing the limits of what the new U.S. Supreme Court majority might allow and laying the groundwork for a day when federal constitutional protections for abortion are weakened or eliminated entirely." Texas has taken a novel approach in their wording of the legislation; rather than have the government enforce the law, private citizens are to be allowed to sue the provider or anyone that helps the woman to get an abortion. The Texas Tribune writes that "supporters of the bill hope this novel provision will trip up legal challenges to the legislation, as without state officials enforcing the ban, there will be nobody for pro-women's rights groups to sue."

=== Timing ===
Because the start of pregnancy is measured from the date of a woman's last menstruation (generally about two weeks before conception), six weeks into a pregnancy equals four weeks of embryonic development, and only two weeks after a woman's first missed period, when many women are unaware that they are pregnant. Most women who have an abortion do so after six weeks' gestation. Reproductive rights advocates contend that because of these and other reasons, the "fetal heartbeat" bills are de facto bans on abortion.

== Terminology ==
While some of these laws ban abortions after six weeks of pregnancy and are called "fetal heartbeat" laws by their proponents who claim that a fetal heartbeat can be detected at six weeks, doctors have said that the term "fetal heartbeat" at that stage is false and intentionally misleading. A conceptus is not called a fetus until after ten weeks of pregnancy. Additionally, since at six weeks the embryo has no heart – only a group of cells which will become a heart – calling it a heartbeat is also misleading. The heart will only have formed enough to be able to hear a real fetal heartbeat by 17–20 weeks of gestation.

Jennifer Keats, an OB-GYN at University of California, San Francisco, stated that the embryo's cardiovascular system at six weeks is "very immature". Keats described the cardiac activity as "a group of cells with electrical activity. That's what the heartbeat is at that stage of gestation... We are in no way talking about any kind of cardiovascular system."

Ted Anderson, formerly president of the American College of Obstetricians and Gynecologists (ACOG), said that "ACOG does not use the term 'heartbeat' to describe these legislative bans on abortion because it is misleading language, out of step with the anatomical and clinical realities of that stage of pregnancy." and "Pregnancy and fetal development are a continuum; What's interpreted as a heartbeat in these bills is actually electrically induced flickering of a portion of fetal tissue that will become the heart as the embryo develops."

"The flickering that we're seeing on the ultrasound that early in the development of the pregnancy is actually electrical activity, and the sound that you 'hear' is actually manufactured by the ultrasound machine." - Nisha Verma, an OB-GYN who specializes in abortion care

Controversy exists surrounding six-week abortion bans in part because there is debate on the point at which an embryo heartbeat can be detected. In 2013, when the Wyoming House of Representatives considered a "heartbeat bill", Norine Kasperik said that "she heard different answers [as] to when a heartbeat is detectable", and in her view "there seemed to be variation by medical equipment used". Mary Throne asked: "Is this abortion illegal at 22 days with a highly invasive ultrasound or is it illegal at 9 weeks when we hear a heartbeat with a stethoscope?" Other critics of the bills have claimed that they ignore that not all embryos' heartbeats become detectable at the same time, even when measured using the same methods.

The Center for Reproductive Rights has stated that there is some inconsistency with regard to these laws; specifically, the Arkansas law requires providers to use an abdominal ultrasound to attempt to detect a fetal heartbeat, while the North Dakota law allows the use of any available technology, including a transvaginal probe, which makes it possible to detect a fetal heartbeat earlier than an abdominal ultrasound can. With specific regard to the North Dakota law, detecting an embryo's heartbeat at six weeks into a pregnancy requires the use of a transvaginal ultrasound, which some members of the abortion-rights movement say is unnecessarily invasive.

== Controversy ==
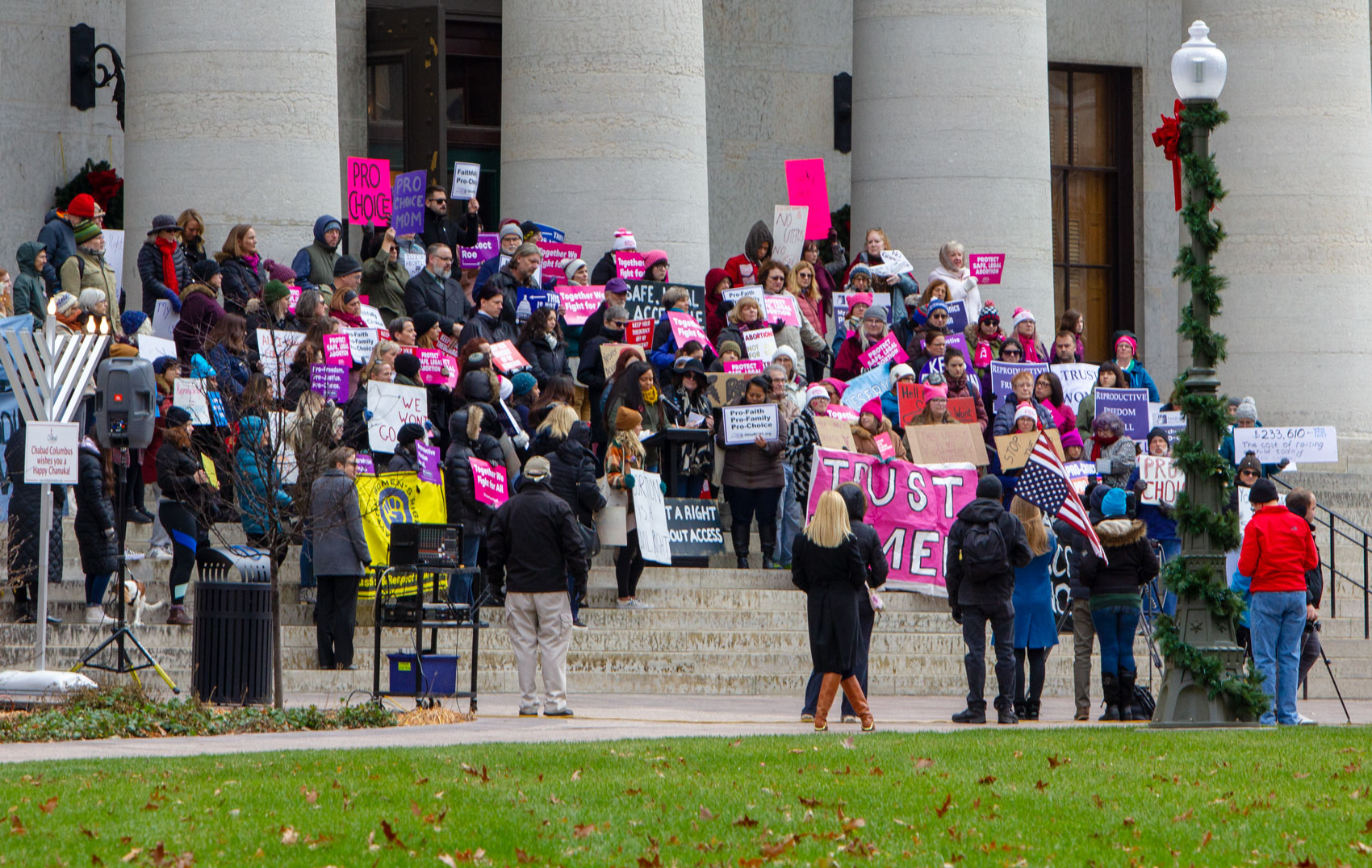
Protest against the Heartbeat bill in Columbus, Ohio on December 4, 2018

=== Pregnancy from rape ===
In the United States, it is estimated that there are 25–32 thousand pregnancies from rape per year in adult women, although the number may be considerably higher, since many women do not report rape. Many victims receive little to no aftercare, and most experience various forms of post-traumatic stress disorder (PTSD). A third of these pregnancies are not discovered until the second trimester. Any delay in detection reduces women's options, especially outside major urban centers. However, this is complicated by the fact that, when they are called on to decide whether to have an abortion, many women are still physically and mentally recovering from being raped (and will continue to for an extended period of time).

Most women do not report sexual assault, and often it is hard to bring an assault case to trial. Teenage girls are especially unlikely to report assault, even though 74% of women who had intercourse before age 14 and 60% of those who had sex before age 15 report having had a forced sexual experience. One study conducted in the 1970s that looked at California data found that "on average, only 413 men were arrested annually for statutory rape in California, even though 50,000 pregnancies occurred among underage women in 1976 alone".

Alabama's "heartbeat bill", passed in 2019, makes abortions illegal even in cases of rape and incest. Furthermore, it requires that judges terminate the parental rights of a man convicted of first-degree rape or certain other sex crimes, leaving a loophole that allows rapists to seek custody of a child conceived as the result of their assault. However, because the law requires a conviction, activists say that since most sexual assaults are never reported, much less produce a finding of guilt in court, many victims are left vulnerable. Activists fear that a victim could find herself in a situation where she would be forced to bear a child of rape and then be forced to co-parent the child with her rapist. Responding to criticism of the Texas "heartbeat bill", which also does not exempt from its provisions women and girls who have been raped, Governor Greg Abbott asserts that the Act will not force a woman who has been raped to carry a pregnancy to term because the state will "work tirelessly to make sure that we eliminate all rapists from the streets of Texas by aggressively going out and arresting them and prosecuting them and getting them off the streets."

=== Constitutionality ===
Before Roe v. Wade (1973) and Planned Parenthood v. Casey (1992) were overturned in Dobbs v. Jackson Women's Health Organization (2022), members of the abortion-rights movement criticized heartbeat bills as violating a constitutionally inferred right to privacy. Critics of six-week abortion bans said that, since Roe established that states must allow abortion until the point of viability (generally between 24 and 28 weeks into the pregnancy), such bills "blatantly contradict[ed]" Supreme Court precedent. The 2013 North Dakota law banning abortions after six weeks was overturned when the District Court for the District of North Dakota found it to be "clearly invalid and unconstitutional based on the United States Supreme Court precedent in Roe v. Wade."

Proponents of six-week abortion bans contended that the constitutional precedent of Roe should be re-examined in light of advancements in law and science. Ohio governor Mike DeWine argued that the main purposes of the bills are to "protect the most vulnerable among us, those who don't have a voice" and that the "government's role should be to protect life from the beginning to the end."

== "Informed consent" laws ==
A related though distinct type of law is that introduced at the state level in all 50 states in the US in October 2011, which would require any woman seeking an abortion to see and hear their conceptus's heartbeat. Supporters included the United States Conference of Catholic Bishops, Americans United for Life, and the Susan B. Anthony List. Another such bill was introduced in Texas. A similar type of legislation, the Heartbeat Informed Consent Act, was introduced at the national level around the same time by Michele Bachmann; however, it died in committee. Another law of this variety, introduced by Sharon Weston Broome, was passed by legislators in Louisiana in 2012, as an amendment to a 2010 bill requiring women seeking an abortion to receive an ultrasound of their conceptus. Similar laws have been passed in states such as Georgia in 2005; and a law that mandated both an ultrasound of the "unborn child" and listening to its heartbeat before an abortion could be procured was laid on the table in 2012 in Pennsylvania. This last bill became controversial when Tom Corbett, Pennsylvania's governor, stated that "You just have to close your eyes" and dismissed accusations that the bill would be unnecessarily obtrusive. Furthermore, while the anti-abortion movement claims that bills mandating a woman listen to her conceptus' heartbeat would increase the likelihood of them changing their mind, the abortion-rights community, with the support of the Pennsylvania Medical Society, opposes "informed-consent" bills because they threaten to, if passed, "significantly jeopardize the open dialogue within the physician-patient relationship."

"Informed consent" laws requiring women seeking abortions to have the physician play a recording of her conceptus' heartbeat have met with challenges in court, notably in Texas, when the CRR filed a lawsuit against it, leading to a court case entitled Texas Medical Providers Performing Abortion Services v. Lakey. Prior to Sam Sparks condemning the law in January 2012, however, a federal district court had ruled that the law violated the First Amendment in August 2011. This decision was reversed by the United States Court of Appeals for the Fifth Circuit, led by Edith Jones. Another similar law was challenged in North Carolina in Stuart v. Huff, in which a federal district court ruled that the law was in violation of the First Amendment. This case, unlike the one in Texas, has not yet been appealed. This has led to some debate among different anti-abortion groups regarding strategy; specifically, while some of these groups, like the Kansas Coalition for Life, have supported the passing of this legislation, others, like Kansans for Life, are concerned that "enacting a fetal heartbeat ban would prompt a court ruling undoing some limits on abortion and providers." Paul Linton, former general counselor for AUL, has argued that fetal heartbeat laws "have no chance in the courts." He, like most mainstream anti-abortion advocates (including James Bopp), prefers instead a legislative strategy that chips away at Roe v. Wade.

== Legal challenges ==
=== Arkansas ===
On May 27, 2015, the Eighth Circuit Court of Appeals affirmed a lower court ruling and permanently blocked the law from being enforced. In January 2016, The U.S. Supreme Court declined to review the case, leaving the Eighth Circuit's ruling in place.

=== Iowa ===
On May 15, 2018, eleven days after Iowa Governor, Kim Reynolds, signed SF 359 into law, Planned Parenthood of the Heartland, Inc., Jill Meadows, and Emma Goldman Clinic (petitioners) filed a lawsuit seeking declaratory and injunctive relief in state court arguing the fetal heartbeat law violated the Iowa State Constitution. On June 1, 2018, Polk County District Court Judge Michael Huppert entered a preliminary injunction which temporarily blocked the law from going into effect. On January 22, 2019, the county district judge declared the law to be in violation of the Iowa Constitution and entered a permanent injunction prohibiting its enforcement. In holding the law unconstitutional the judge cited the Iowa Supreme Court's 2018 ruling in a challenge to a different abortion-restriction in which the state's court of last resort held that "a woman's right to decide whether to terminate a pregnancy is a fundamental right under the Iowa Constitution." Anti-abortion proponents have said they hope this litigation creates a pathway for Roe v. Wade to be reexamined by the U.S. Supreme Court, but University of Iowa law professor Paul Gowder and other legal experts have said that it is almost impossible that it could end up in front of the U.S. Supreme Court, as the U.S. Supreme Court does not review Supreme Court decisions concerning state constitutional questions.

In response to Judge Michael Huppert's ruling that Iowa's heartbeat abortion ban violates the state Constitution, anti-abortion legislators have filed legislation to amend the state constitution to state "that the Constitution of the State of Iowa does not secure or protect a right to or require the funding of abortion." The resolutions proposing to amend Iowa's constitution are SJR 9 and HJR 5 which were filed on January 24, 2019, and February 6, 2019, respectively.

=== Kentucky ===
Kentucky already has three lawsuits over abortion restrictions.

=== North Dakota ===
In July 2015, the Eighth Circuit Court of Appeals affirmed a lower court decision blocking HB 1456 from going into effect. The U.S. Supreme Court declined to review the case and the law remains permanently blocked.

=== South Carolina ===
In August 2022, the South Carolina Supreme Court temporarily granted an injunction suspending the law until it could make a ruling on the constitutionality of the law. In January 2023, the court overturned the law in a 3–2 split decision, ruling that the 2022 six-week abortion ban violates a woman's right to privacy which is granted by the state constitution.

=== Texas ===
There have been multiple lawsuits challenging enforcement of the 2021 Texas Heartbeat Act. Several of these are still pending or active.

== State laws ==
=== Summary table ===
State	Session	Bill	Lower house	Upper house	Executive	Status
Alabama (Note: Abortions in this state are banned, there are no abortion providers available or the situation around these states' abortion legality is rapidly developing)	2014	HB 490	Passed 73–29	Died in committee	—	Failed
Alabama	2019	HB 314	Passed 74–3	Passed 25–7	Signed	Effective June 24, 2022
Alaska	2019–20	HB 302	Did not pass	—	—	Failed
Arizona	2022	HB 2483	Passed 31–28	Died in committee	—	Failed
Arkansas	2013	SB 134	Passed 68–20	Passed 26–8	Vetoed	Effective
Arkansas	2013	SB 134	Overrode 56–33	Overrode 20–14	Overridden	Effective
Arkansas	2021	HB 1012	Died in committee	—	—	Failed
Arkansas	2022	HB 1118	Died in committee	—	—	Failed
Florida	2019	HB 235	Died in committee	—	—	Failed
Florida	2019	SB 792	—	Died in committee	—	Failed
Florida	2022	HB 167	Died in committee	—	—	Failed
Georgia	2019–20	HB 481	Passed 92–78	Passed 34–18	Signed	Effective as July 20, 2022
Idaho	2021	HB 366	Passed 53–16	Passed 25–7	Signed	Effective, de facto overridden by SB 1309
Idaho	2022	SB 1309	Passed 51–14	Passed 28–6	Signed	Effective
Iowa	2018	SF 359	Passed 51–46	Passed 29–17	Signed	Effective
Kentucky	2019	SB 9	Passed 71–19	Passed 31–6	Signed	Effective
Louisiana	2019	SB 184	Passed 79–23	Passed 31–5	Signed	Effective
Maryland	2019	HB 933	Did not pass	—	—	Failed
Maryland	2019	HB 978	Withdrawn	—	—	Failed
Michigan	2019–20	HB 4664	Did not pass	—	—	Failed
Michigan	2021–22	HB 5445	Did not pass	—	—	Failed
Minnesota	2019	HF 271	Did not pass	—	—	Failed
Minnesota	2019	SF 869	—	Did not pass	—	Failed
Mississippi	2019	SB 2116	Passed 78–37	Passed 34–14	Signed	Effective
Missouri	2019	HB 126	Passed 117–39	Passed 24–10	Signed	Effective
Nebraska	2022	LB 781	N/A (unicameral legislature)	Indefinitely postponed	—	Failed
North Carolina	2021–22	H 31	Died in committee	—	—	Failed
North Dakota	2013	HB 1456	Passed 63–28	Passed 26–17	Signed	Temporarily blocked by state court
Ohio	2016	HB 493	Passed 56–39	Passed 21–10	Vetoed	Failed
Ohio	2018	HB 258	Passed 58–35	Passed 18–13	Vetoed	Failed
Ohio	2018	HB 258	Overrode 61–28	Failed to override	Vetoed	Failed
Ohio	2019	SB 23	Passed 56–40	Passed 19–13	Signed	Effective June 24, 2022
Ohio	2023	November 2023 Ohio Issue 1				Ballot initiative, passed 56-44
Oklahoma	2021	HB 2441	Passed 80–19	Passed 37–10	Signed	Temporarily blocked by state court
Oklahoma	2022	SB 1503	Passed 68–12	Passed 33–11	Signed	Effective as of May 3, 2022 de facto overridden by a statute criminalizing abortion at all stages of pregnancy (with some exceptions), signed on May 26
Pennsylvania	2017–18	HB 2315	Died in committee	—	—	Failed
Pennsylvania	2021–22	HB 904	Did not pass	—	—	Failed
Pennsylvania	2021–22	SB 378	—	Died in committee	—	Failed
South Carolina	2019–20	H 3020	Passed 64–22	Did not pass	—	Failed
South Carolina	2021–22	S 1	Passed 74–39	Passed 30–13	Signed	Struck down by state court
South Carolina	2023–24	S 474	Passed 82–32	Passed 27–19	Signed	Temporarily blocked by state court
Tennessee	2019	HB 77	Passed 65–21	Indefinitely postponed	—	Failed
Tennessee	2020	HB 2263	Passed 70–20	Passed 23–5	Signed	Effective June 28, 2022
Texas	2013	HB 59	Did not pass	—	—	Failed
Texas	2019	HB 1500	Did not pass	—	—	Failed
Texas	2021	SB 8	Passed 83–64	Passed 18–12	Signed	Effective as of October 8, 2021
West Virginia	2019	HB 2903	Did not pass	—	—	Failed
West Virginia	2019	HB 2915	Did not pass	—	—	Failed
Wisconsin	2022	SB 923	—	Did not pass	—	Failed
Wyoming	2013	HB 97	Died in committee	—	—	Failed
Wyoming	2021	HB 0134	Died in committee	—	—	Failed

=== Alabama ===
House Bill 490 prohibiting abortions after a heartbeat can be detected was passed by a vote of 73–29 in the Alabama House on March 4, 2014. In doing so they became the first state to pass such a bill. The bill later died in committee.

In 2019, Alabama passed an abortion law that is more far-reaching than a heartbeat law. On April 2, 2019, House Bill 314 banning abortions at every stage of pregnancy and criminalizing the procedure for doctors (except in the case of medical emergency or lethal fetal anomaly), was introduced into the House. The bill passed the House on April 30 (74–3), passed the Senate on May 14, and was signed into law by Governor Kay Ivey on May 16.

=== Arkansas ===
A fetal heartbeat bill, banning abortion after twelve weeks, was passed on January 31, 2013, by the Arkansas Senate, vetoed in Arkansas by Governor Mike Beebe, but, on March 6, 2013, his veto was overridden by the Arkansas House of Representatives. A federal judge issued a temporary injunction against the Arkansas law in May 2013, and in March 2014, it was struck down by federal judge Susan Webber Wright, who described the law as unconstitutional.

=== Florida ===
Two fetal heartbeat bills were filed in the Florida Legislature in 2019. Rep. Mike Hill filed a fetal heartbeat bill (HB 235) on January 10, 2019, in the Florida House of Representatives. A companion bill (SB 792), was filed in the Florida Senate on February 6, 2019, by Sen. Dennis Baxley. The bills, which are identical, would have made it a third-degree felony for a doctor to perform an abortion on a woman after a fetal heartbeat is detected, unless the "woman has been diagnosed with a condition that would create a serious risk of substantial and irreversible impairment of a major bodily function if the woman delayed terminating her pregnancy." Both bills died in committee.

Florida Governor Ron DeSantis has pledged to sign legislation that would ban abortions after a fetal heartbeat was detected.

=== Georgia ===
Two fetal heartbeat bills were filed in the Georgia General Assembly in 2015.

Rep. Ed Setzler introduced HB 481 in the Georgia House of Representatives on February 25, 2019. A similar bill is expected to be filed in the Georgia State Senate by Sen. Bruce Thompson soon. During his campaign for Governor, Brian Kemp, now the governor of Georgia, "vow[ed] to sign the toughest abortion laws in the country" and when asked about litigation said, "bring it! I'll fight for life at the Capitol and in the courtroom." After being passed in the House on March 7, 2019, HB 481 was passed out of a Senate committee on March 18, 2019. It was subsequently passed by the entire state Senate, after which it was narrowly passed by the House 92–78. The bill was signed by Governor Kemp on May 7, 2019, bringing into effect one of the strictest abortion laws in the country at the time.

The bill would prohibit abortions after a heartbeat can be detected in a conceptus, which is usually when a woman is six weeks pregnant. Democratic opponent of the Georgia bill, former gubernatorial candidate Stacey Abrams, called the bill a "forced pregnancy bill."

In September 2024, HB 481 was struck down by the Fulton County Superior Court. Following the ruling, abortions were allowed in Georgia up to the 22 week of pregnancy. However, the law was put back in place after the state appealed to the Supreme Court of Georgia.

=== Idaho ===
Rep. Gregory Chaney introduced HB 366 on April 13, 2021, that would ban abortions after a fetal heartbeat is detected. The bill passed the house by a vote of 53–16 on April 16, 2021, and the senate on April 21, 2021, by a vote of 25–7 and was later signed into law by Governor Brad Little on April 29, 2021. The law included exceptions for cases of rape, incest, and when the mother's life is in danger. The law goes into effect if another similar ban is upheld by appellate court.

=== Iowa ===
On May 4, 2018, governor Kim Reynolds signed into law a bill that would ban abortion in Iowa after a fetal heartbeat is detected, starting July 1, 2018. On January 22, 2019, a county district judge declared the law to be in violation of Iowa's State Constitution and entered a permanent injunction prohibiting its enforcement. However, In 2023, The Iowa State Legislature passed and Governor Kim Reynolds signed into law a new 6-week Ban. The ban would be blocked by a lower court until July 23, 2024, when the Iowa Supreme Court ruled 4-3 for the ban to go into effect. See the Iowa Lawsuit section of this article under the Legal challenges heading for more details related to the litigation over Iowa's fetal heartbeat bill.

=== Kansas ===
The bill was introduced and referred to committee in February 2013. The bill was presented to the Kansas house in March 2013. The bill was known as House Bill 2324, "An act prohibiting an abortion of an unborn human individual with a detectable fetal heartbeat." One outspoken advocate of such bills is Mark Gietzen, who has tried to gather as many signatures as possible in order to get Sam Brownback to convene a special session of Congress in order to consider the bill. Gietzen also advocated for a fetal heartbeat law to be passed during a special session of the Kansas legislature, to be held on September 3, 2013. HB 2324 died in committee in May 2014.

=== Kentucky ===
Two bills which seek to prohibit abortions after a fetal heartbeat is detected have been filed in the Kentucky General Assembly in 2019. Sen. Matt Castlen introduced SB 9 in the Kentucky Senate on January 8, 2019. On February 14, 2019, SB 9 passed out of the Kentucky Senate by a 31–6 vote. The bill was received in the House on February 15, 2019. Damon Thayer, the Senate Republican floor leader said SB 9 "absolutely" was a priority for the chamber and said he would be delighted if it became law and ended up before the U.S. Supreme Court as a means to overturn to Roe v. Wade "It would be the pinnacle of my career," he said. On March 14, 2019, the Kentucky House passed SB 9 by a vote of 71–19. As of April 2019, the ACLU filed suit to challenge it and a federal judge blocked enforcement until the final ruling in district court.

A similar bill by Rep. Robert Goforth was introduced in the Kentucky House of Representatives. The bill, HB 100, which was prefiled on December 13, 2018, was referred to the Health and Family Services Committee on January 10, 2019. When asked about the heartbeat bill, Rep. Goforth, who announced his candidacy for Governor of Kentucky on January 8, 2019, the same day the bill was introduced, said he would be pleased if Kentucky or one of the other states considering similar measures enacted such a law and, in the event of court challenge, took the case to the U.S. Supreme Court in an effort to overturn Roe v. Wade.

Previous fetal heartbeat bills filed in Kentucky have failed to pass. A fetal heartbeat bill, HB 132, was introduced on January 7, 2014, by Joseph Fischer. The bill was referred to the House Health and Welfare Committee on March 19, 2014, where the bill died. In 2013, Rep. Fischer introduced the same bill with the same bill number (Hb 132) on January 11, 2013. The bill was referred to the House Health and Welfare Committee on February 20, 2013, where the bill died.

=== Maryland ===
Two fetal heartbeat bills have been filed in the Maryland House of Delegates in 2019. On February 8, 2019, Ric Metzgar filed HB 933. On February 8, 2019, Robin L. Grammer, Jr. filed HB 978, a bill entitled "Keep Our Hearts Beating Act."

=== Minnesota ===
On January 22, 2019, Tim Miller filed HF 271 in the Minnesota House of Representatives.

=== Mississippi ===
In 2018, three heartbeat bills were filed in Mississippi; all of which died in committee. In 2017, three heartbeat bills were filed in Mississippi; all of which died in committee. In 2014, Sen. Joey Fillingane, filed a heartbeat bill in the Mississippi State Senate. The bill died in committee. In 2013, HB 6, was introduced in January and died in committee on February 5, 2013.

Another fetal heartbeat bill filed in 2019, HB 529 by Robert Foster died the House Judiciary A Committee on February 5, 2019.

Three fetal heartbeat bills were filed in the Mississippi Legislature in January 2019. SB 2116, by Sen. Angela Burks Hill was referred to the Public Health and Welfare Committee on January 11, 2019. HB 732, by Rep. Chris Brown was referred to the Public Health and Human Services Committee on January 17, 2019. After passing out of their respective committees on February 5, 2019, both SB 2116 and HB 732, were passed out of the Mississippi Senate and Mississippi House on February 13, 2019. On March 19, 2019, the Senate concurred in the House amendments to SB 2116, and on March 22, 2019, the fetal heartbeat bill was signed into law by Mississippi Governor Phil Bryant.

=== Missouri ===
Two fetal heartbeat bills have been filed in Missouri on January 9, 2019. SB 139 was filed in the Missouri Senate by Sen. Andrew Koenig; the bill is pending in the Health and Pensions Committee. HB 126 was filed in the Missouri House of Representatives by Rep. Nick Schroer. On January 30, 2019, HB 126 was referred to the Children and Families Committee, and on February 12, 2019, a public hearing on the bill was completed. On February 21, 2018, HB 126 was voted out of committee to the full House with the recommendation that it "do pass." On February 27, 2019, HB 126 was passed out of the Missouri House and was sent to the state Senate. Missouri's House Speaker Elijah Haahr has said he supports the "heartbeat bill" calling it a top priority for the 2019 session. When asked if he would sign a fetal heartbeat bill, Governor Mike Parson said, "I've been pro-life my entire career, and I support that all the time."

The bill was signed on May 24, 2019, with an effective date of August 28, 2019. The bill bans abortions after 8 weeks, with no exceptions for rape or incest.

=== North Dakota ===
North Dakota HB 1456 was signed into law in March 2013 by Jack Dalrymple, who stated that it was "a legitimate attempt by a state legislature to discover the boundaries of Roe v. Wade." A federal district court found that it clearly violated the constitutional protections afforded in Roe v. Wade and it was quickly blocked. In July of that year, a lawsuit had been filed with regard to the law by the Center for Reproductive Rights (CRR), on behalf of the only abortion clinic in North Dakota, Red River Women's Clinic. In July 2015, the 8th U.S. Circuit Court of Appeals blocked the bill. The case was appealed to the Supreme Court, but the court denied a writ of certiorari in January 2016 and let stand the decision of the 8th Circuit Court of Appeals.

=== Ohio ===
In Ohio, a fetal heartbeat bill, HB 125, co-authored by Janet Porter, was introduced in the state legislature in October 2011. The bill was shelved by the Republican majority Senate to avoid controversy. This bill was notably supported by Jack Willke. The original Bill was authored by Janet Porter of Faith2Action; former Governor John Kasich vetoed it twice prior to its passing.

A related law was signed in Ohio in 2013 (HB 248) by John Kasich, which mandates, among other things, that doctors who do not test for a fetal heartbeat must be subject to criminal penalties; specifically, "The doctor's failure to do so would be a first-degree misdemeanor, carrying up to six months in jail, for the first violation and a fourth-degree felony, carrying up to 18 months in jail, for subsequent violations." A further fetal heartbeat bill, based on Porter's original, was introduced on August 14, 2013, by Lynn Wachtmann and others.

On March 25, 2015, another heartbeat bill (House Bill 69) passed the Ohio House of Representatives. The Guardian reported that "The bill is unlikely to go any further, facing stiff opposition in the senate as well as from John Kasich, the Republican governor of Ohio."

On December 6, 2016, the Ohio Senate added a heartbeat ban provision to an unrelated bill, House Bill 493, previously passed by the Ohio House of Representatives. The bill was returned to the House and passed by the House the same day. The bill as passed would make abortion after the detection of a fetal heartbeat a fifth-degree felony except in cases where a physician judges the abortion necessary "to prevent the death of the pregnant woman or to prevent a serious risk of the substantial and irreversible impairment of a major bodily function of the pregnant woman." On December 13, 2016, Kasich vetoed the bill, on the basis that it was unconstitutional and would almost certainly be struck down if challenged in court. The Ohio House of Representatives considered whether to override Kasich's veto, which would require a three-fifths vote in both the House and the Senate. However, the House leadership opted not to call lawmakers back to Columbus before the end of the year, ensuring Kasich's veto would stand.

The bill passed the Ohio Senate with a vote of 21 yeas, out of 33 seats in the senate; it received 10 nays:

House Bill 493 – Final vote in the Senate
Party	Votes for	Votes against	Abstained/Absent
Republican (23)	21: Bacon; Balderson; Beagle; Burke; Eklund; Faber; Gardner; Hackett; Hite; Hottinger; Hughes; Jones; Jordan; LaRose; Lehner; Obhof; Oelslager; Patton; Peterson; Seitz; Uecker	2: Coley; G. Manning	–
Democratic (10)	–	8: Cafaro; Gentile; Sawyer; Schiavoni; Skindell; Tavares; Thomas; Williams	2: Brown; Yuko
Total (33)	21	10	2

In the House of Representatives, the bill passed the Ohio House with a vote of 56 yeas, out of 99 seats in the house; it received 39 nays:

House Bill 493 – Final vote in the House of Representatives
Party	Votes for	Votes against	Abstained/Absent
Republican (65)	55: Ron Amstutz; Niraj Antani; Nan Baker; John Becker; Louis Blessing; Terry Boose; Andrew Brenner; Tom Brinkman; Jim Buchy; Tony Burkley; Jim Butler; Margaret Conditt; Robert Cupp; Bill Dean; Jonathan Dever; Anthony DeVitis; Mike Dovilla; Tim Ginter; Wesley Goodman; Doug Green; Christina Hagan; Dave Hall; Steve Hambley; Bill Hayes; Michael Henne; Brian Hill; Ron Hood; Steve Huffman; Candice Keller; Kyle Koehler; Al Landis; Sarah LaTourette; Rob McColley; Derek Merrin; Dorothy Pelanda; Rick Perales; Bill Reineke; Wes Retherford; Jeff Rezabek; Kristina Roegner; Mark Romanchuk; Cliff Rosenberger; Margaret Ruhl; Scott Ryan; Tim Schaffer; Gary Scherer; Kirk Schuring; Marilyn Slaby; Ryan Smith; Robert Sprague; Louis Terhar; Andy Thompson; Nino Vitale; Ron Young; Paul Zeltwanger	7: Marlene Anielski; Steve Arndt; Mike Duffey; Theresa Gavarone; Cheryl Grossman; Stephanie Kunze; Nathan Manning	3: Anne Gonzales; Terry Johnson; Ron Maag
Democratic (34)	1: Bill Patmon	32: Nickie Antonio; Michael Ashford; John E. Barnes Jr.; Heather Bishoff; John Boccieri; Kristin Boggs; Kevin Boyce; Janine Boyd; Christie Bryant; Nicholas J. Celebrezze; Jack Cera; Kathleen Clyde; Hearcel Craig; Michael Curtin; Denise Driehaus; Teresa Fedor; Stephanie Howse; Greta Johnson; David J. Leland; Michele Lepore-Hagan; Michael O'Brien; Sean O'Brien; John Patterson; Debbie Phillips; Dan Ramos; Alicia Reece; John Rogers; Michael Sheehy; Kent Smith; Fred Strahorn; Martin J. Sweeney; Emilia Sykes	1: Stephen Slesnick
Total (99)	56	39	4

Two fetal heartbeat bills were introduced in the Ohio General Assembly in 2019, marking the 133rd Session of the Ohio General Assembly as the fifth time such legislation has been proposed in the state. On February 11, 2019, Christina Hagan and Ron Hood filed HB 68, which was introduced in the Ohio House of Representatives on February 12, 2019. On February 12, 2019, Kristina Roegner filed SB 23 in the Ohio Senate; the bill was referred to the Health, Human Services and Medicaid Committee on February 13, 2019. On February 21, 2019, the President of the Ohio Senate, Larry Obhof pledged to pass SB 23 out of the upper chamber stating, "We are going to pass that bill by the middle of March. I have no doubt at all." On March 13, 2019, SB 23 was passed out of the Ohio Senate by a vote of 19 to 13. The next month, the Ohio House amended the bill, and passed it, 56–40; the changes were ratified in the Senate, 18–13. The bill was signed into law by Governor Mike DeWine on April 11, 2019. On July 3, 2019, a federal judge blocked the implementation of the bill temporarily, just days before the law was to take effect.

=== Oklahoma ===
A fetal heartbeat bill (SB 1274) was signed into law by then-Oklahoma governor Mary Fallin in April 2012 that requires an abortion provider to offer a woman the opportunity to hear the conceptus's heartbeat before ending the pregnancy, and applies when the conceptus is at least eight weeks old. The bill took effect in November 2012.

=== Pennsylvania ===
A fetal heartbeat bill (HB 2315) was introduced in the Pennsylvania House of Representatives on May 2, 2018, primarily sponsored by Rep Rick Saccone. The bill was referred to the Judiciary Committee where it died.

=== South Carolina ===
State Representative John McCravy prefiled HB 3020 in the South Carolina House of Representatives in December 2018. The bill, which is entitled "Fetal Heartbeat Protection from Abortion Act", was introduced on January 8, 2018, and referred to the House Judiciary Committee. Previous attempts to pass fetal heartbeat bills in the South Carolina General Assembly had failed. The State Senate voted 30–13 on January 27, 2021, to pass the new ban. The law had exceptions for cases of rape, incest, and when the life of the mother is at risk. The state's Republican-controlled House had passed similar legislation in previous years. McMaster signed the bill into law on February 18, 2021, but it was blocked by U.S. District Court Judge Mary Geiger Lewis a mere day later following a lawsuit by Planned Parenthood and Greenville Women's Clinic. In January 2023, the law was permanently overturned by the state supreme court.

=== Tennessee ===
Two fetal heartbeat bills were filed in the Tennessee General Assembly in 2019. On January 23, 2019, by Rep. James "Micah" Van Huss filed HB 77 in the Tennessee House of Representatives. On February 7, 2019, Sen. Mark Pody filed SB 1236 in the Tennessee Senate. On February 20, 2019, HB 77 was passed out of a Public Health subcommittee and sent to the full committee. On February 26, 2019, the House Public Health Committee voted 15–4 to send HB 77 to the House floor for a full vote. On February 7, 2019, HB 77 was passed out of the Tennessee House by a vote of 66–21.

=== Texas ===
A fetal heartbeat bill was previously introduced in Texas by Phil King on July 18, 2013, in the wake of Rick Perry signing Texas Senate Bill 5 into law. The bill was not passed. The bill (HB 1500) is joint authored by Representatives Phil King, Dan Flynn, Tan Parker, and Rick Miller. As of February 26, 2019, HB 1500 had 57 sponsors or cosponsors of the 150 members of the Texas House of Representatives. Former State Senator Wendy Davis said HB 1500 is "the most dangerous I've ever seen."

On March 11, 2021, state senator Bryan Hughes of Mineola, Texas, introduced a fetal heartbeat bill entitled the Texas Heartbeat Bill (SB8) into the Texas Senate and state representative Shelby Slawson of Stephenville, Texas, introduced a companion bill (HB1515) into the state house. It includes an exception for medical emergencies but includes cases where a woman or girl has become pregnant by incest or rape. Governor Greg Abbott asserts that the Act will not force a woman who has been raped to carry a pregnancy to term because the state will "work tirelessly to make sure that we eliminate all rapists from the streets of Texas by aggressively going out and arresting them and prosecuting them and getting them off the streets."

The SB8 version of the bill passed both chambers and was signed into law by Texas Governor Abbott on May 19, 2021. It will take effect on September 1, 2021. Rather than have the government enforce the law, private citizens will be allowed to sue the provider or anyone that helps the woman to get an abortion. Although similar, H.B NO 1515 is not to be confused with bill H.R 705, also known as the Heartbeat Protection Act of 2021, which was introduced to Congress on February 2, 2021, and sponsored by Republican Mike Kelly. As both bill's note the criminalization of physician's performing abortions once a heartbeat is detected around the 6 week mark of a woman's pregnancy. The Texas Tribune wrote that "supporters of the bill hope this novel provision will trip up legal challenges to the legislation, as without state officials enforcing the ban, there will be nobody for pro-women's rights groups to sue".

A key aspect in the enforcement of the HB 1515 bill is connected to the cost of being sued. As listed in the introductory act, if an organization or individual were found guilty of assisting in an abortion, each individual would be fined a minimum of $10,000. In contrast to the H.R 705, the HB 1515 only mentions punishment through the $10,000 fines, whereas if found guilty under H.R 705, physicians are not only subject to receiving a fine, but are also subject to prison time as well.

According to some individuals associated with the support of HB 1515, the severity of the cost of being sued is intentional. John Seago, an active legislative director for Texas Right to Life, an anti-abortion organization, exemplifies this connection. Seago notes that the cost of getting sued can act as an incentive for abortion providers to avoid administering abortions. According to the Texas Tribune, Seago said, "Have a public statement. Put it on their website that they're not scheduling appointments after six weeks", in doing so individuals associated with performing abortion halt their practice, and are no longer at risk for conducting the fine.

In June 2021, 18-year-old Paxton Smith, senior class valedictorian, delivered a high school graduation speech addressing the Texas heartbeat bill rather than the one which had been pre-approved by her school saying, "I cannot give up this platform to promote complacency and peace, when there is a war on my body and a war on my rights." The speech went viral and was viewed by millions on YouTube, TikTok, and Twitter.

The bill was temporarily blocked by District Court Judge Robert L. Pitman on October 6, 2021, but reinstated by an appeals court panel on October 8.

=== West Virginia ===
Two fetal heartbeat bills have been introduced in the West Virginia House of Delegates in 2019. On February 7, 2019, Ralph Rodighiero (D-Logan) filed HB 2903 entitled "The Fetal Hearbeat Act". On February 8, 2019, Evan Worrell (R-Cabell) filed HB 2915.

=== Wyoming ===
A fetal heartbeat bill, HB 97, was introduced in the Wyoming House of Representatives in January 2013 by Representative Kendell Kroeker. In February 2013, the bill was struck down by a house committee in a 4–5 vote.

== See also ==
- Abortion in the United States
- Abortion in the United States by state
- Heart development
