= Jeffery Todd Smith =

American politician

Todd Smith

Member of the Ohio House of Representatives from the 43rd district
- In office July 24, 2018 – December 31, 2020
- Preceded by: Jeff Rezabek
- Succeeded by: Rodney Creech

Personal details
- Party: Republican
- Education: Cincinnati Christian University

Jeffery 'Todd' Smith is a former member of the Ohio House of Representatives, representing the 43rd district from 2019 to 2020. A Republican, Smith previously served as a minister for over twenty years prior to entering politics, including as pastor of the Church at Farmersville and, more recently, a sister church in West Chester. In 2018, Representative Jeff Rezabek opted to not seek reelection, and Smith won the primary to succeed him. In the general election, Smith narrowly defeated Montgomery County Commissioner Daniel Foley by only 87 votes.

== Links ==
- Representative J. Todd Smith (official site)
