= Richard Hollington =

American politician

Mayor Hunting Valley Ohio
- In office 2012–2020

Member of the Ohio House of Representatives from the 98th district
- In office February 6, 2010 – January 18, 2012
- Preceded by: Matt Dolan
- Succeeded by: Mary Brigid Matheney

Member of the Ohio House of Representatives from the 56th district
- In office 1967–1970
- Succeeded by: Harry Lehman

Personal details
- Born: 1932 (age 93–94)
- Party: Republican
- Occupation: Lawyer

Richard Hollington Jr. is a former Republican member of the Ohio House of Representatives representing the 98th district.

Hollington is a lawyer and a partner in Baker & Hostetler LLP. He first served as a representative from 1967-70. In February 2010 incumbent representative Matt Dolan resigned in order to unsuccessfully seek an executive position in Cuyahoga County, and Hollington was named as his replacement until the election in November. State Senator Tim Grendell won the November election but decided to remain in the Senate instead of taking up the House seat, so Hollington was again appointed to represent the 98th district. Hollington resigned his position after being elected mayor of his village in November 2011.
