= Mary Brigid Matheney =

American politician

Member of the Ohio House of Representatives from the 98th district
- In office February 14, 2012 – April 16, 2012
- Preceded by: Richard Hollington
- Succeeded by: Matt Lynch

Personal details
- Born: January 18, 1974 (age 52) Mayfield Heights, Ohio
- Party: Republican
- Spouse: Matthew
- Education: University of Dayton; Cleveland–Marshall College of Law
- Profession: Lawyer

Mary Brigid "Bridey" Matheney, (born January 18, 1974) is a Republican former member of the Ohio House of Representatives. She was appointed to the position in February 2012, and served until April 16, 2012, when she was replaced by Matt Lynch. Matheney graduated from the University of Dayton with a Bachelor of Arts in Political Science in 1996. She later graduated Juris Doctor, cum laude, from the Cleveland–Marshall College of Law in 1999.
