= Roland Winburn =

American politician

Member of the Ohio House of Representatives from the 43rd district
- In office January 5, 2009 – December 31, 2014
- Preceded by: Fred Strahorn
- Succeeded by: Jeff Rezabek

Personal details
- Born: January 19, 1946 (age 80) Dayton, Ohio
- Party: Democratic
- Education: Central State University
- Profession: Psychologist, Small Business Owner

Roland Winburn (born January 14, 1946) is a former Democratic member of the Ohio House of Representatives, representing the 43rd District from 2009 to 2014.

== Career ==
Winburn, a Dayton native and graduate of Chaminade High School, earned a bachelor's degree in psychology from Central State University. He used his formal education in his work as a psychotherapist employed by Good Samaritan Hospital and Health Center, and as a Child and Family Psychotherapist in a private psychological practice.

He began his life in public service when Montgomery County's Office of Family and Children First hired him to coordinate the planning and evaluation of community health, human and social service programs, and staff to the Local Children's Trust Fund Advisory Board. He also managed several Montgomery County General Fund contracts and Human Services Levy recipient agencies.

Winburn was appointed as a Harrison Township Trustee in 2001 and elected to two full, four-year terms in 2002 and 2006. A businessman, Winburn is the owner and founder of Ajenti Limousine Service in Dayton. He recently worked for the National Conference for Community and Justice of Greater Dayton as Fund Development Director.

== Ohio House of Representatives ==
With incumbent Representative Fred Strahorn unable to run again due to term limits, Winburn entered the race. He faced primary opposition in fellow Democrat Vic Harris, but won the nomination by about 2,000 votes. He went on to defeat Republican Ann Siefker in the general election by about 21,000 votes. For the 128th General Assembly, Winburn served as Parliamentarian of the Ohio Legislative Black Caucus.

Winburn defeated independent candidate David Wilson by 13,000 votes to take a second term in 2010. Currently, Winburn is on the committees of Ways and Means; Economic and Small Business Development; and Criminal Justice (as ranking member). He also serves on the Commission on Minority Health; the State Criminal Sentencing Commission; as well as the Speed and Scale Taskforce.

In 2011, Winburn came out against a measure that tried to require a photo ID to cast a ballot, stating that it disenfranchises minorities in the polling places.

In 2012, following redistricting, Winburn won reelection with 53.31% of the vote over Republican Joyce Deitering. Winburn was defeated in 2014 by Jeff Rezabek.
