= Tracy Maxwell Heard =

American politician

Tracy Heard
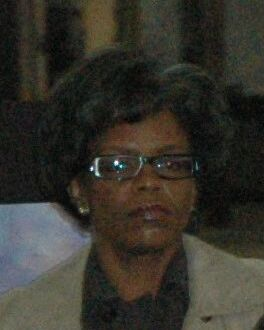

Member of the Ohio House of Representatives from the 26th district
- In office January 2, 2007 – December 31, 2014
- Preceded by: Mike Mitchell
- Succeeded by: Hearcel Craig

House Minority Leader
- In office June 1, 2013 – December 31, 2014
- Preceded by: Armond Budish
- Succeeded by: Fred Strahorn

House Minority Whip
- In office January 3, 2011 – June 1, 2013
- Leader: Armond Budish
- Preceded by: John Adams
- Succeeded by: Michael Ashford

House Majority Leader
- In office October 21, 2009 – January 3, 2011
- Preceded by: Jennifer Garrison
- Succeeded by: Matt Huffman

House Assistant Majority Leader
- In office January 5, 2009 – October 21, 2009
- Preceded by: Jim Carmichael
- Succeeded by: Allan Sayre

Personal details
- Born: February 3, 1963 (age 63) Columbus, Ohio
- Party: Democratic
- Education: University of Akron (B.A.)
- Profession: Auditor, News Anchor, Community Developer

Tracy Maxwell Heard (born February 3, 1963) is the former Minority Leader of the Ohio House of Representatives, and previously served as the minority whip, assistant majority leader and as the majority leader. She is the first African-American woman, and one of two African-Americans, the other being William L. Mallory, Sr., to hold the office of majority leader.

A member of the Democratic Party, Heard has represented Ohio's 26th House district, which includes central, eastern and southern parts of Franklin County, since 2006. Between 2006 and 2012, Ohio's 26th House District included Berwick, Downtown Columbus, Driving Park, Olde Towne East, and other parts of East and South Columbus. After redistricting in 2012, the 26th District no longer includes Downtown Columbus.

She is a graduate of the University of Akron.

== Life and career ==
After graduating from the University of Akron, Heard worked as a noncompliance auditor for Banc of America Practice Solutions, as well as for the Livingston Avenue Collaborative for Community Development. Her mother-in-law is a former Columbus School Board member. She was launched into politics following campaign work on President Bill Clinton's 1996 presidential campaign, and went on to work in the Ohio Senate as a legislative aide. Heard is also known for her former roles as a news anchor.

== Ohio House of Representatives ==
Although the 26th District had long been a Democratic seat and incumbent Representative Mike Mitchell was only in his first term, both Heard and businessman Clarence Glover decided to try to unseat him in 2006. Benefiting from good name recognition, Heard defeated Mitchell, just as he had defeated an incumbent two years earlier, by about 1,600 votes. In the 2006 general election, Heard faced Michael D. Elicson, but easily routed him by around 20,000 votes.

Heard, in her first term during the 127th General Assembly, was elected as secretary for the Ohio Legislative Black Caucus, and early on in her career, was also mentioned as a potential member of leadership in the future. In 2008, Heard won reelection over Republican Joseph Healy by a staggering 32,000 votes. Subsequently, Heard was named by colleagues as assistant majority leader for the 128th General Assembly, the first Democratic assistant majority leader since Vernon Sykes in the 120th General Assembly. She also went on to serve as President of the Ohio Legislative Black Caucus Foundation.

When Majority Leader Jennifer Garrison stepped down from her leadership role in late 2009 to focus on a bid for Ohio Secretary of State, Heard was tapped to replace her, and moved up from assistant. Speaker of the House Armond Budish also appointed Heard to chairwoman of the House Public Safety and Homeland Security Committee after erstwhile Chairwoman Linda Bolon stepped down early in 2010.

While many of the 2010 races were very contentious, Heard was easily reelected to her penultimate term, beating Republican Joseph Healy, this time by 19,529 votes. The results of the 2010 election, however, swept Democrats out of control of the Ohio House and Heard out of the majority leader role. For the 129th General Assembly, the Democrats saw fit to elect Heard to be the minority whip.

Heard won her final term in the Ohio House of Representatives, defeating Joseph Healy a third time by 31,756 votes. She was term-limited in 2014.

== House initiatives and positions ==
Heard has introduced an initiative to create a uniform, statewide process for dealing with and counting provisional ballots during elections, stating the legislation "will ensure the voter is directed to the correct precinct, and it will require the poll worker to identify the voter's correct precinct on the form. If the checklist is not completed correctly it will constitute poll worker error and the voter's ballot will count."

An opponent of charter schools, Heard has come out against a budgetary proposal to quadruple the amount of vouchers available for children to be sent to the schools. She has stated that they are ill prepared for what they could potentially face.

In regards to Senate Bill 5, Heard has accused Ohio Governor John Kasich, claiming that political theatrics are being used in regards to compromise for the bill.

== Electoral history ==
Ohio 26th House District: Results 2006-2012
Year	Democrat	Votes	Pct	Republican	Votes	Pct
2006	Tracy Heard	25,330	82.03%	Michael D. Elicson	5,549	17.97%
2008	Tracy Heard	40,248	83.14%	Joseph Healy	8,162	16.86%
2010	Tracy Heard	25,813	80.42%	Joseph Healy	6,284	19.58%
2012	Tracy Heard	40,372	82.41%	Joseph Healy	8,616	17.59%
