= Richard Adams (Ohio politician) =

American politician (born 1939)

Member of the Ohio House of Representatives from the 80th district
- In office January 5, 2009-December 31, 2014
- Preceded by: Diana Fessler
- Succeeded by: Steve Huffman

Personal details
- Born: January 1, 1939 (age 87) Troy, Ohio, U.S.
- Party: Republican
- Education: Ohio State University (BS in agriculture education, JD)
- Profession: Educator, Agriculture

Richard Adams (born January 1, 1939) is a former member of the Ohio House of Representatives, serving the 80th District from 2009 to 2014.

== Career ==
Adams previously served two terms as Miami County Commissioner, as well as a member of the Unity National Bank Board of Directors. He also served as a high school agriculture instructor for Northwestern High School, vice president of Clark State Community College and founding superintendent of the Upper Valley Joint Vocational School District.

== Ohio House of Representatives ==
When incumbent Diana Fessler was unable to run for another term due to term-limits, Adams, along with Joe Lemaster, sought the Republican nomination to succeed her. In the end, Adams ended up winning the nomination with 73.12% of the vote. He went on to win the general election against Democrat Melissa Stanley with 63.2% of the electorate, and was sworn into his first term on January 5, 2009.

In 2010, Adams opted to run for reelection. Unopposed in the primary, Adams defeated Democrat Howard Payne in the general election with 77.09% of the vote. He served on the committees of Finance and Appropriations and its Health and Human Services Subcommittee; Health and Aging and its Subcommittee on Retirement and Pensions; Commerce and Labor; and Financial Institutions, Housing, and Urban Development (as chair).

In 2013, Adams announced he would not seek another term. Steve Huffman was elected to succeed him.
