= Jeff Rezabek =

American politician

Member of the Ohio House of Representatives from the 43rd district
- In office January 6, 2015 – June 18, 2018
- Preceded by: Roland Winburn
- Succeeded by: Jeffery Todd Smith

Personal details
- Born: March 27, 1969 (age 57)
- Party: Republican

Jeff Rezabek (born March 27, 1969) is the former Representative of the 43rd district of the Ohio House of Representatives. Rezabek is an attorney who originally is from Grand Island, New York. He relocated to Dayton to attend law school at the University of Dayton. In 2014, Rezabek decided to challenge incumbent Representative Roland Winburn for a seat in the Ohio House of Representatives. While Winburn originally held a safely Democratic district, redistricting made him vulnerable, and Rezabek was able to defeat him 58% to 42%. He was the first Republican to represent the district in forty years.
