= Clayton Luckie =

American politician

Member of the Ohio House of Representatives from the 39th district
- In office November 14, 2006 – January 7, 2013
- Preceded by: Dixie Allen
- Succeeded by: Fred Strahorn

Personal details
- Born: June 9, 1963 (age 63) Dayton, Ohio
- Party: Democratic
- Education: Sinclair Community College, Ohio State University
- Profession: Marketing

Clayton R. Luckie II was a Democratic member of the Ohio House of Representatives, representing the 39th District since his appointment in 2006 until his decision to withdraw from the race for re-election in 2012, culminating with his replacement in January 2013.

In August 2012, Luckie announced that he would not seek re-election to this position in the 2012 election, following the news that he was under criminal investigation on an undisclosed matter, one stated only to be "something other than bribery".

In October 2012, it was revealed that Luckie was under investigation by and had surrendered to the Federal Bureau of Investigation for felony and misdemeanor charges involving political corruption, including misuse of campaign funds and theft in office.

The two candidates that were seeking Luckie's current House of Representatives position were Fred Strahorn (Democrat), a former state senator, and Jeff Wellbaum (Republican), a decorated Iraq War veteran. In the November 2012 election, Fred Strahorn won the position, with over 80% of the vote, the voting district in question traditionally being heavily Democratic.

Luckie plead not guilty to the charges and was released on bond. It was reported that Luckie suffered an undisclosed health issue while being booked into jail. He was taken a hospital, treated, and released. When asked for a statement by the media, he replied "no comment".

Despite not having attended any state functions since July 9, 2012, Luckie continued to receive a paycheck as he waited out his final months in office. A number of officials had called for his resignation. Had Luckie resigned, a placeholder would have been required to fill his position, as the elected Strahorn was not legally allowed to do so until his official term began. On December 20, 2012, it was announced that Luckie would stand trial beginning on January 22, 2013, if no plea bargain could be worked out. His term officially ended on January 7, 2013, with the swearing in of Fred Strahorn. On January 21, 2013, Luckie officially agreed to a plea deal on nine charges.

In 2019, Luckie was sentenced to four months in jail after pleading guilty in a mail fraud case described as being part of a federal investigation into a "culture of corruption" within the city of Dayton.

== Background ==
Luckie graduated from Chaminade Julienne High School in Dayton. He then earned an associate degree in economics from Sinclair Community College and a bachelor's degree from Ohio State University.

After graduating from the Ohio State University where he volunteered for both his local state representative C.J. McLin and former Speaker Vern Riffe, Luckie served as a member of the Dayton School Board from 1996 to 2006. He also worked for National City Bank and then the Montgomery County Community Development Office.

He currently serves as Marketing and Sales Director of JEC Paper and Related Products, one of the nation's largest minority-owned companies. Luckie lives in Dayton in the Wright-Dunbar Historic District and is divorced, with two children.

== Ohio House of Representatives ==
While Luckie had initially filed to run for the seat held by term-limited Dixie Allen, his ascension to the Statehouse was expedited when Allen switched to the Republican Party and subsequently resigned her seat to run for Montgomery County Commissioner. Although the seat was vacant, Democrats waited until after the 2006 general election to officially seat Luckie, who took his seat on November 14, 2006. He was easily reelected in 2008, as well as in 2010.

For the 127th General Assembly, Luckie served as Third Vice President of the Ohio Legislative Black Caucus, as well as treasurer of the OLBC Foundation. For the 128th General Assembly, Speaker of the House Armond Budish named Luckie Chairman of the Ohio Controlling Board, and Vice Chairman of the House Education Committee. He also served as OLBC Foundation secretary.

In the 129th General Assembly, Luckie was Montgomery County's most senior state legislator, and served on the committees of Education (as ranking member), and Insurance. He also served as a member of the Controlling Board; the Education Management Information System Advisory Board; the Governor's advisory board of Faith-Based and Community Initiatives; the State Regional Alliance Advisory Board; and the Ohio Accountability Task Force.

== Initiatives and positions ==
A former member of the Dayton School Board, Luckie was a key player in education reform. He advocated for the benefits of a longer school year, stating it would help students to better retain information. "Many kids lose what they have learned through the year in the summertime. By having a longer school (year) we would keep that review time down." Additionally, legislation that would change district financial reporting requirements from a five-year forecast to a three-year one might also be amended. He said he favored the idea of a five-year forecast because it allows legislators to be able to see how changes to law will affect schools going forward.

Luckie has also been an opponent of a plan to allow more vouchers for charter schools, stating that he believes allowing for it would dilute the success of all types of schools across the board. Luckie has also voice opposition to allowing charter schools, STEM schools and Catholic schools to be provided with public school transportation when those schools schedule to make up "calamity days". He described it as an unfunded mandate, and has stated that all Democrats would more than likely support the bill if it wasn't for the transportation language.

With a bill requiring a photo ID to cast a ballot passed in three days through the Ohio House of Representatives, Luckie stated that it was the same as a "modern day poll tax". Luckie feels that the legislation could disenfranchise African American voters at the polls.

After the release of a man who was convicted of a rape he did not commit, Luckie has encouraged the state to conduct more DNA testing, stating too many individuals are found guilty by association or are in the wrong place at the wrong time.

== Felony investigation ==
On October 10, 2012, it was officially revealed that Luckie was under investigation by the Federal Bureau of Investigation and was escorted by F.B.I. agents to jail after turning himself in to their office in Columbus, Ohio. Luckie was charged with 45 felony offenses and 4 misdemeanors. The felony charges included Engaging in a Pattern of Corrupt Activity, Theft in Office, Money laundering and Forgery. The four misdemeanors were related to the filing of false financial disclosure statements. Had he been convicted on the most serious charge, Engaging in a Pattern of Corrupt Activity, also known as a RICO charge, he faced a maximum of eleven years in prison.

Luckie was slated to stand trial beginning on January 22, 2013. Ron O'Brien, prosecutor for Franklin County, Ohio, had stated that talks for a plea bargain were ongoing, but the state was ready to go to trial should a deal not be worked out. A representative for Luckie, when asked why Luckie had not stepped down from his position, stated that "the presumption of innocence has to be paramount".

=== Plea deal ===
On January 21, 2013, Luckie agreed to a deal to plead guilty to seven felonies, one misdemeanor, and an additional count of grand theft, in exchange for the dismissal of the remainder of the charges. On January 22, 2013, he was sentenced to three years in prison, three years on probation and ordered to pay back the salary he took during the time between when he was indicted and when his term ended. He was eligible for early release in six months, depending on his continued cooperation with the F.B.I. investigation. On January 24, 2013, it was reported that Luckie had potentially tried to claim mileage reimbursement for an unused parking pass during the time that he was under investigation and that the Franklin County Prosecutor was weighing the possibility of additional charges after seeking more information.

Luckie applied for early release in April 2014, but the request was denied, as it was felt that his actions were "egregious violations of the public trust". Luckie was also barred from running for any public office for five years. In March 2015, Luckie again applied for early release, but the request was again denied by the same judge, who felt that "release at this time would demean the seriousness of the offenses". Luckie's three-year sentence ended in 2016. Following this, Luckie was seen attended a meeting of the board of Dayton Public Schools in which the stabbing of a student attending one of the district's elementary schools was discussed.

== Corruption ==
In 2019, Luckie was one of several public officials indicted in regards to a Federal investigation into a "culture of corruption" in Dayton, Ohio. On July 2, 2019, Luckie plead guilty to a single charge of mail fraud, facing anywhere from 0 to 20 years in prison.

In November 2019, Luckie was sentenced to four months in prison followed by three years of supervised release, with the first four months served in home detention. The sentence was said by his attorney to come as a shock to Luckie, who had argued for probation. The judge in the case, Thomas M. Rose, stated that "This is the kind of activity that the community needs protection from. A community cannot tolerate an individual that takes advantage of programs that are set for the purposes of good." The sentence also includes 100 hours of community service, and under the terms of his plea deal, Luckie cannot appeal the sentence. U.S. Assistant Attorney Brent Tabacchi stated that Luckie's being sent to jail in the first conviction in the wider case sends a message. The judge expressed frustration during sentencing, stating that Luckie had a good childhood, a good family life and was a good parent, highly educated with minimal health concerns. Thus, he did not understand why he acted the way he did, other than that he could. On November 26, Luckie wrote a letter requesting a pardon from then-U.S. President Donald Trump for his actions, stating "Bottom line. If you care about the minority community this would be a good example to show a pardon" and that "The only thing I was guilty on was not making sure my paperwork was completed. ... Being black in America, you have to do what you have to do to survive." In December 2019, Luckie submitted a motion with the court to stay his sentence and later a motion to grant appeal, alleging that prosecutors withheld information that would have exonerated him. As part of his plea deal, Luckie had waived his right to appeal, except in the case of a claim of ineffective assistance of counsel or prosecutorial misconduct. On January 15, 2020, the appeals court dismissed Luckie's appeal of his sentence as untimely and denied a motion to stay his sentence.
