= Steve Huffman (Ohio politician) =

American politician (born 1964)

Stephen A. Huffman

Member of the Ohio Senate from the 5th district
- Incumbent
- Assumed office January 1, 2019
- Preceded by: Bill Beagle

Member of the Ohio House of Representatives from the 80th district
- In office January 3, 2015 – December 31, 2018
- Preceded by: Richard Adams
- Succeeded by: Jena Powell

Personal details
- Born: November 14, 1964 (age 61)
- Party: Republican
- Education: University of Toledo; Medical College of Ohio

Stephen A. Huffman (born November 14, 1964) is a Republican member of the Ohio Senate, representing the 5th district since 2019. Previously, Huffman served two terms in the Ohio House of Representatives.

== Life and career ==
Huffman is a lifelong resident of Miami County and was raised in Ludlow Falls, Ohio. He graduated from the University of Toledo and has been a practicing physician for nearly 20 years. In 2013, Huffman announced that he was running for the Ohio House of Representatives after the incumbent, Richard Adams, announced he was not seeking another term. Huffman won a three-way primary with 45% of the vote, and won the general election to take the seat with 77% of the vote.

== Ohio Senate ==
In 2018, state Senator Bill Beagle was term-limited, leaving the 5th district an open seat for that year's election. As a result, Huffman opted to forego another term in the Ohio House to run for the Senate seat. A competitive seat, the 5th district was a Democratic stronghold until it was won by Beagle in 2010. Despite this, Huffman prevailed, winning over Democrat Paul Bradley, 53% to 47%.

Huffman was sworn in for his first term on January 1, 2019. Ohio Senate President Matt Huffman (R-Lima) is his cousin.

Huffman was reelected in 2022 with 94.6% of the vote, defeating independent candidate Nancy Kiehl. There was no Democratic opposition in the general election, nor was Huffman opposed in the Republican primary.

=== Committee assignments ===
During the 134th General Assembly, Huffman was assigned to the following Ohio Senate committees:

- (chair of) Health Committee
- (Vice Chair of) Agriculture & Natural Resources Committee
- Insurance Committee
- Primary & Secondary Education Committee

== Controversies ==
In December 2019, The Washington Post detailed how an editorial in the Sidney Daily News against Medicare for all by Huffman was drafted with the help of lobbyist Kathleen DeLand of the pharmaceutical, hospital, and healthcare insurance lobbying group, Partnership for America's Health Care Future. Two Montana state lawmakers, Rep. Kathy Kelker and Sen. Jen Gross, were also implicated.

In a June 9, 2020, hearing on whether to declare racism a public health crisis in Ohio, Huffman asked if it were possible blacks were contracting coronavirus at higher rates because "the colored population do not wash their hands as well as other groups". Ohio Legislative Black Caucus President Stephanie Howse said, "The fact that a well-educated legislator – a Vice Chair of the Health Committee and a practicing medical doctor – would, in a public setting, nonchalantly use such antiquated terminology paired with a hurtful, racist stereotype all in one breath reflects how unconscious this problem of racism is for too many." Huffman later apologized. His employer, TeamHealth, dismissed him June 11, 2020, for his remarks.

In January 2021, Huffman was appointed to lead the Senate Health Committee by Ohio Senate President Matt Huffman (R-Lima), his cousin, drawing new criticism from Black lawmakers in light of Huffman's previous comments.
