= Bill Beagle =

American politician

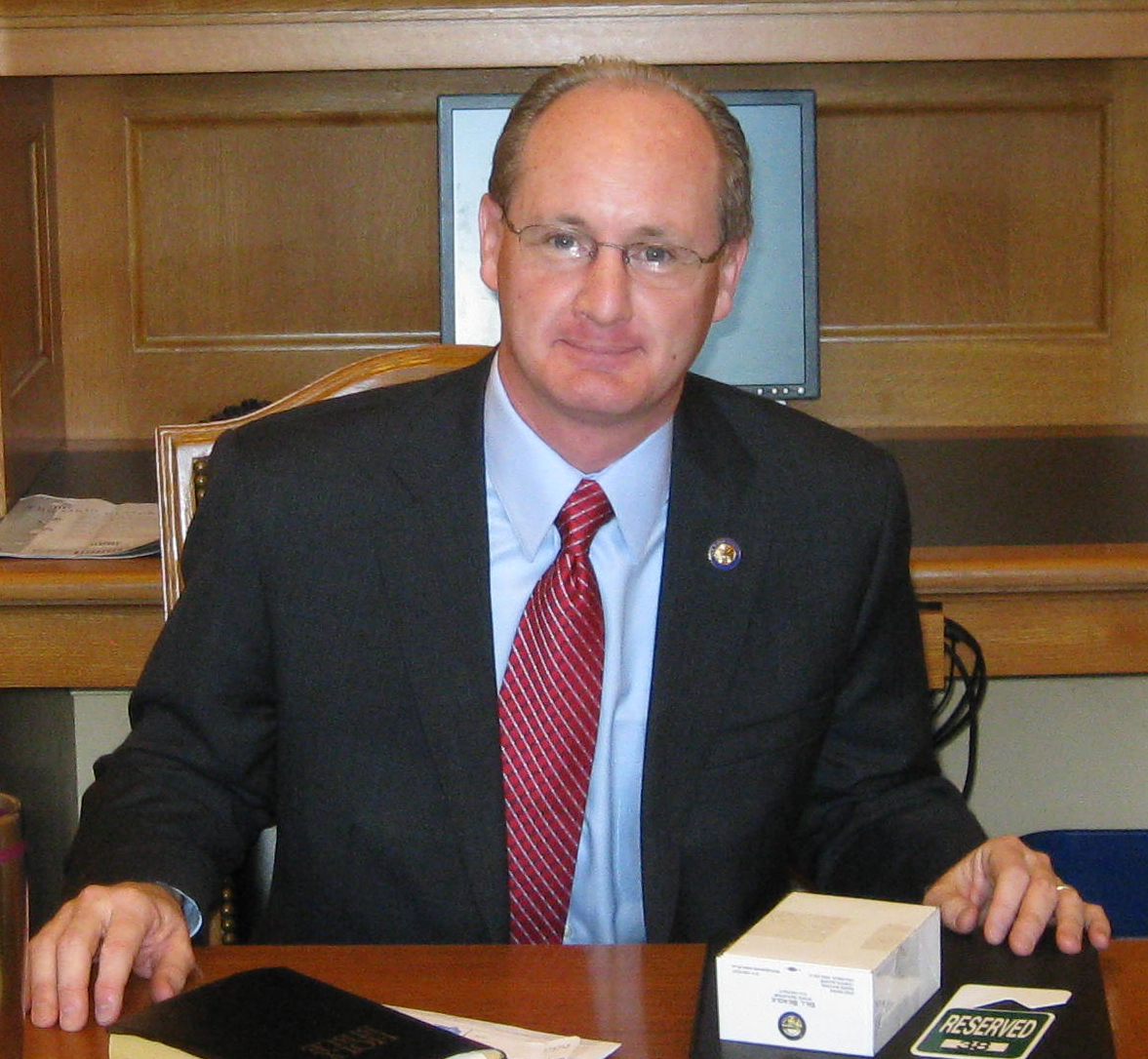

Member of the Ohio Senate from the 5th district
- In office January 3, 2011 – December 31, 2018
- Preceded by: Fred Strahorn
- Succeeded by: Steve Huffman

Personal details
- Born: December 6, 1964 (age 61) Syracuse, New York U.S.
- Party: Republican
- Spouse: Karen Beagle
- Children: 3
- Education: Miami University; Cleveland State University

Bill Beagle (born December 6, 1964) is a former American politician who served as state senator for the 5th District of the Ohio Senate from 2011 to 2018. For part of his tenure, Beagle served as the Chairman for the Senate Workforce and Economic Development Committee. He is a Republican.

== Life and career ==
Beagle graduated from Miami University with a degree in finance and from Cleveland State University with a M.B.A. He has worked as a financial analyst, but has since remained at home to raise his three children. After being actively involved in the community, he was appointed to the Tipp City Council in 2003, and was reelected in 2005.

== Ohio Senate ==
When incumbent Senator Tom Roberts resigned in 2009, former Representative Fred Strahorn was appointed to the Senate to replace him. While at first not considered vulnerable due to the presence of heavily Democratic Dayton, Republicans began to target Strahorn's seat as a potential pickup early in 2010. Beagle entered the race to try to oust him, and first faced a primary challenge from ultra-Conservative Joe Lemaster. He won by about 2,500 votes. Soon after, the strong Republican sentiment allowed for the seat to become contentious, and in the general election, Beagle was again successful, winning a close race against Strahorn by 1,700 votes.

He was sworn into office for his first term on January 3, 2011, taking the oath of office from Justice Robert Cupp. Beagle easily won re-election in 2014 with 57% of the vote.

== Key legislation ==
In 2018 he voted "no" to overriding Gov. Kasich's veto of the controversial "heartbeat bill" that would have defined the life of a fetus at the first sound of a heartbeat. The bill ultimately was passed in 2019, with a new governor vowing to sign it into law.

In June 2013, Ohio Governor John Kasich signed into law a bill that requires judges to report to law enforcement when they sentence a violent offender to mental-health treatments rather than prison. Senator Beagle cosponsored the bill, which later passed in the legislature, with a vote of 32–1 in the Senate and 92–0 in the House.

== Electoral history ==
Ohio Senate 5th District: Results 2010 & 2014
Year	Democrat	Votes	Pct	Republican	Votes	Pct
2010	Fred Strahorn	47,681	49.15%	Bill Beagle	49,339	50.85%
2014	Dee Gillis	37,817	42.72%	Bill Beagle	50,711	57.28%

== Personal life ==
Beagle is married to Karen Beagle and together they have three children. They reside in Tipp City, Ohio.
