= Gerald Stebelton =

American politician (1939–2026)

Member of the Ohio House of Representatives from the 77th district
- In office January 2, 2007 – December 31, 2014
- Preceded by: Tim Schaffer
- Succeeded by: Tim Schaffer

Personal details
- Born: Gerald Lowell Stebelton; September 13, 1939 Lancaster, Ohio, U.S.
- Died: October 14, 2026 (aged 87) Pickerington, Ohio, U.S.
- Party: Republican
- Education: Ohio State University B.S. Aeronautical and Astronautical Engineerin; Capital University Law School
- Profession: Engineer, attorney

Gerald Lowell Stebelton (September 13, 1939 – October 14, 2026) was an American politician who was a member of the Ohio House of Representatives, representing the 77th District from 2007 to 2014.

== Career ==
After working as an aeronautical engineer and contracting officer for Battelle Memorial Institute, leading negotiating teams in Iran and Germany in the 1960s and '70's, Stebelton earned a law degree and became an assistant prosecuting attorney in Franklin County.

Stebelton was the senior shareholder of the Lancaster law firm Stebelton, Aranda & Snider. He also served on the Lancaster City Council and Board of Education, and was a member of the Republican Central Committee.

== House of Representatives ==
Stebelton initially ran for the House in 2006, after incumbent Tim Schaffer moved to the Ohio Senate. He won decisively, and was reelected in 2008, and ran again unopposed in 2010.

For the 129th General Assembly, Speaker of the House William G. Batchelder has named Stebelton as a member of the Republican majority caucus' Policy Committee, as well as member of the Judiciary and Ethics Committee, the Finance and Appropriations and the Primary and Secondary Education Subcommittee, as well as the Chairman of the Education Committee.

In 2012, Stebelton won a final term with 59% of the vote against Democrat Kelly Bryant. He was term-limited in 2014.

== Death ==
Stebelton died from complications of Parkinon's disease in Pickerington, Ohio, on October 14, 2026, at the age of 87.
