= Fred Strahorn =

American politician

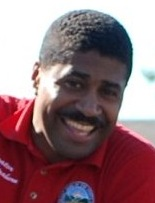

Minority Leader of the Ohio House of Representatives
- In office January 5, 2015 – February 6, 2019
- Preceded by: Tracy Maxwell Heard
- Succeeded by: Emilia Sykes

Member of the Ohio Senate from the 5th district
- In office March 31, 2009 – December 31, 2010
- Preceded by: Tom Roberts
- Succeeded by: Bill Beagle

Member of the Ohio House of Representatives from the 39th district
- In office January 7, 2013 – December 31, 2020
- Preceded by: Clayton Luckie
- Succeeded by: Willis Blackshear Jr.
- In office January 3, 2001 – December 31, 2008
- Preceded by: Tom Roberts
- Succeeded by: Roland Winburn

Personal details
- Born: March 20, 1965 (age 61) Cincinnati, Ohio, U.S.
- Party: Democratic
- Education: Embry–Riddle Aeronautical University; Ohio State University (BS); Sinclair Community College

Frederick W. Strahorn (born March 20, 1965) is an American Democratic politician who served in the Ohio House of Representatives, representing the 39th District, which consists of much of Dayton, Ohio. He served as the Minority Leader for the 131st Ohio General Assembly and 132nd Ohio General Assembly.

== Life and career ==
Strahorn served as a member of the Wright State University Board of Trustees, a position that ended in 2013. He attended Embry-Riddle Aeronautical University and graduated with a B.A. in aviation management from Ohio State University. He also attended Sinclair Community College for real estate coursework.

Strahorn won his election to the Ohio House of Representatives in 2000 and was re-elected in 2002, 2004 and 2006. Strahorn was term limited out of running again in his previous district, but chose to run for election in a different district in 2012.

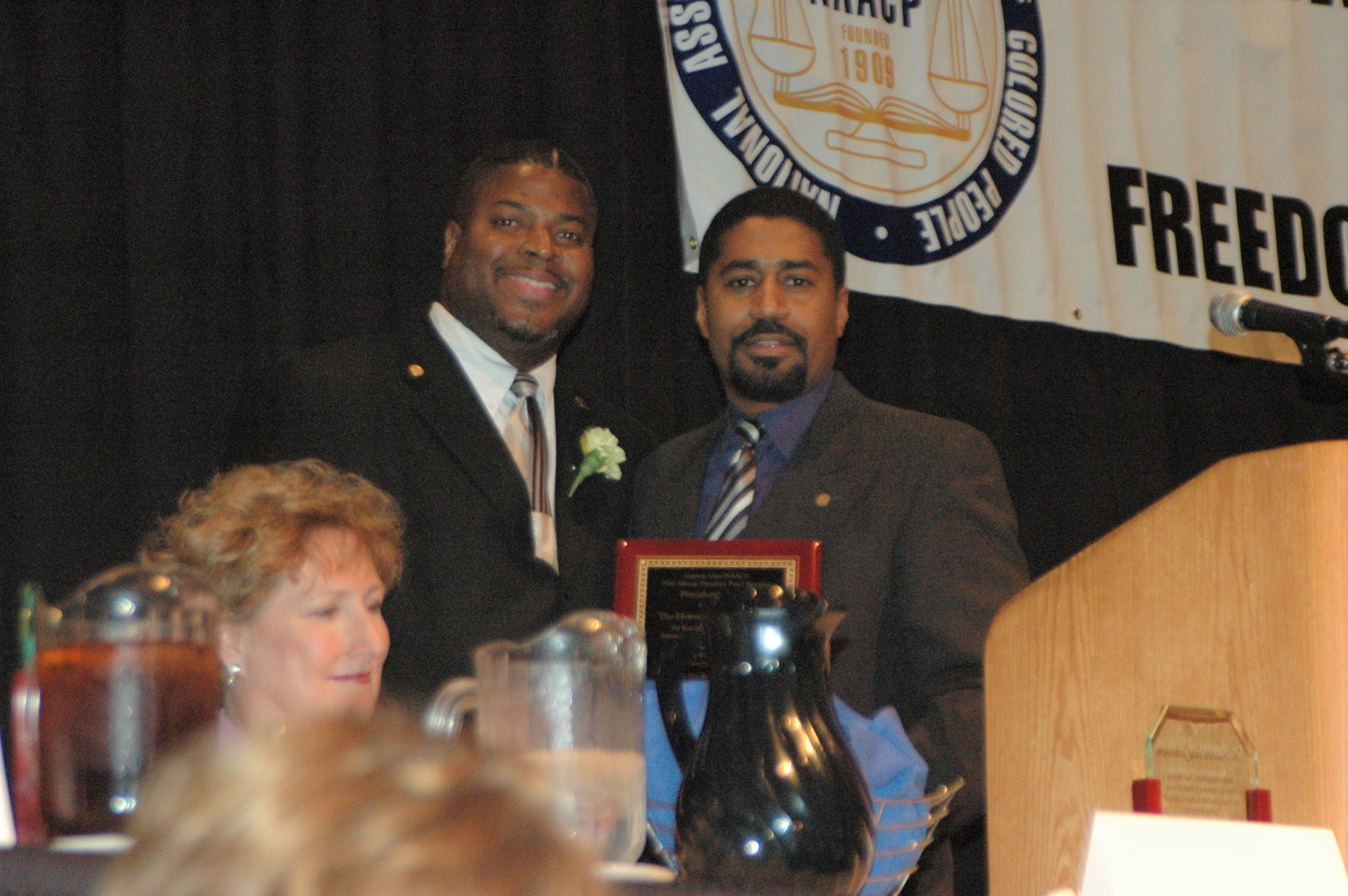
Dayton NAACP President Derrick Foward presents Strahorn with the President's Award

In 2008, Strahorn received the Dayton Unit NAACP President's Award from civil rights activist Derrick Foward, the president of the Dayton NAACP.

The following year, Strahorn was appointed to the Ohio Senate to replace Tom Roberts, who had been appointed to the Ohio Civil Rights Commission, but lost election to a full term to Republican Bill Beagle.

=== Return to the Ohio House of Representatives ===
Strahorn was chosen as the Democratic candidate for the position on August 12, 2012, at the Montgomery County Democratic headquarters, with a vote of 41–1.

First elected in November 2012, Strahorn defeated his opponent, Jeffrey Wellbaum, with over 80% of the vote in a traditionally Democratic district. The two competed to fill the position that had been vacated in January 2013 by Clayton Luckie, who had earlier announced his withdrawal from the election following the news that he was being investigated on criminal charges.

Strahorn soundly won re-election in 2014 with over 75% of the vote. His opponents were Jeff Dalton, Republican, and William Pace, an independent perennial candidate.

On November 18, 2014, Strahorn was elected as Minority Leader of the Ohio House by the Democratic Caucus. Strahorn stated that he would work on trying to make clear the Democratic Party's message to voters, commenting "I know that we have work to do with the general public with communicating what our party really stands for." He was reelected to the position in 2016.

Circa 2016, Strahorn gave an impassioned labor rights speech, denouncing the union busting tactics of Moraine's Fuyao Glass America plant and praising workers who choose to unionize with the UAW. His speech was featured in 2019 documentary film American Factory.

== Electoral history ==
Election results
Year	Office	Election	Votes for Strahorn	%	Opponent	Party	Votes	%	Opponent	Party	Votes	%
2000	Ohio House of Representatives	General	22,411	68.96%	Brian L. Whitaker	Republican	7,956	24.48%	Logan Martinez	Independent	2,132	6.56%
2002	Ohio House of Representatives	General	19,725	71.81%	Martin Arbagi	Republican	7,744	28.19%				
2004	Ohio House of Representatives	General	33,325	70.17%	Glenn Jones	Republican	14,164	29.83%				
2006	Ohio House of Representatives	General	23,523	74.17%	Martin Arbagi	Republican	8,192	25.83%				
2010	Ohio Senate	General	47,681	49.15%	Bill Beagle	Republican	49,339	50.85%				
2012	Ohio House of Representatives	General	37,831	82.99%	Jeffrey L. Wellbaum	Republican	7,756	17.01%				
2014	Ohio House of Representatives	General	16,344	77.5%	Jeffrey Dalton	Republican	3,891	18.41%	William Pace	Independent	895	4.24%
2016	Ohio House of Representatives	General	27,558	100%								
2018	Ohio House of Representatives	General	26,879	100%								

== Personal life ==
He is a member of the Baptist faith and has one daughter.

Ohio House of Representatives
Preceded by Tracy Maxwell Heard	Minority Leader of the Ohio House of Representatives; 2015–2019	Succeeded by Emilia Sykes
