= Ohio's 5th senatorial district =

American legislative district

Ohio's 5th State Senate district
Senator
Steve Huffman; R–Tipp City
- Demographics: 83.7% White; 9.8% Black; 2.1% Hispanic; 1.9% Asian; 2.1% Native American; 0.1% Hawaiian/Pacific Islander
- Population (2020) • Voting age • Citizens of voting age: 352,880; 272,619; 266,294

Ohio's 5th senatorial district was changed in the 2023 redistricting and is currently made up of Miami, Preble County, southern Dark County and a section of Montgomery County that is north and west of Dayton. It now encompasses the 39, 40, and 80 house districts.

The current Ohio Senator is Republican Steve Huffman and will be succeeded by Republican member-elect Phil Plumber in January 2027.

== 2026 election results ==
Phil Plumber (R) 90,591 64.1%

Jeffery Davis (D) 50,830 35.9%

== Historically ==
The 5th senatorial District centered on Dayton comprising the counties of Miami and Preble along with portions of the counties of Darke and Montgomery. It encompassed Ohio House districts 39, 43 and 80. It has a Cook PVI of R+20.

== List of senators ==
Senator	Party	Term	Notes
Clara Weisenborn	Republican	January 3, 1967 – December 31, 1974	Weisenborn lost re-election in 1974 to Nick Zimmers.
Nick Zimmers	Democrat	January 3, 1975 – December 31, 1994	Zimmers opted not to seek re-election.
Rhine McLin	Democrat	January 3, 1995 – December 1, 2001	McLin resigned to become Mayor of Dayton, Ohio.
Tom Roberts	Democrat	January 9, 2002 – February 28, 2009	Roberts resigned to become a member of the Ohio Civil Rights Commission.
Fred Strahorn	Democrat	March 31, 2009 – December 31, 2010	Strahorn lost re-election in 2010 to Bill Beagle.
Bill Beagle	Republican	January 3, 2011 – December 31, 2018	Beagle was term-limited.
Steve Huffman	Republican	January 1, 2019 – present	Incumbent
