= Blasdel =

Blasdel is a surname. Notable people with the surname include:

- Christopher Yohmei Blasdel (born 1951), performer
- Chuck Blasdel (born 1971), Ohio politician
- Henry G. Blasdel (1825–1900), the first Governor of Nevada
- Mark Blasdel (born 1976), Montana politician
- Monica Robb Blasdel, Ohio politician
- Thomas A. Blasdel (1843–1932), soldier during the American Civil War

== See also ==
- Blasdell (surname)
