= Tim Ginter =

American politician (born 1955)

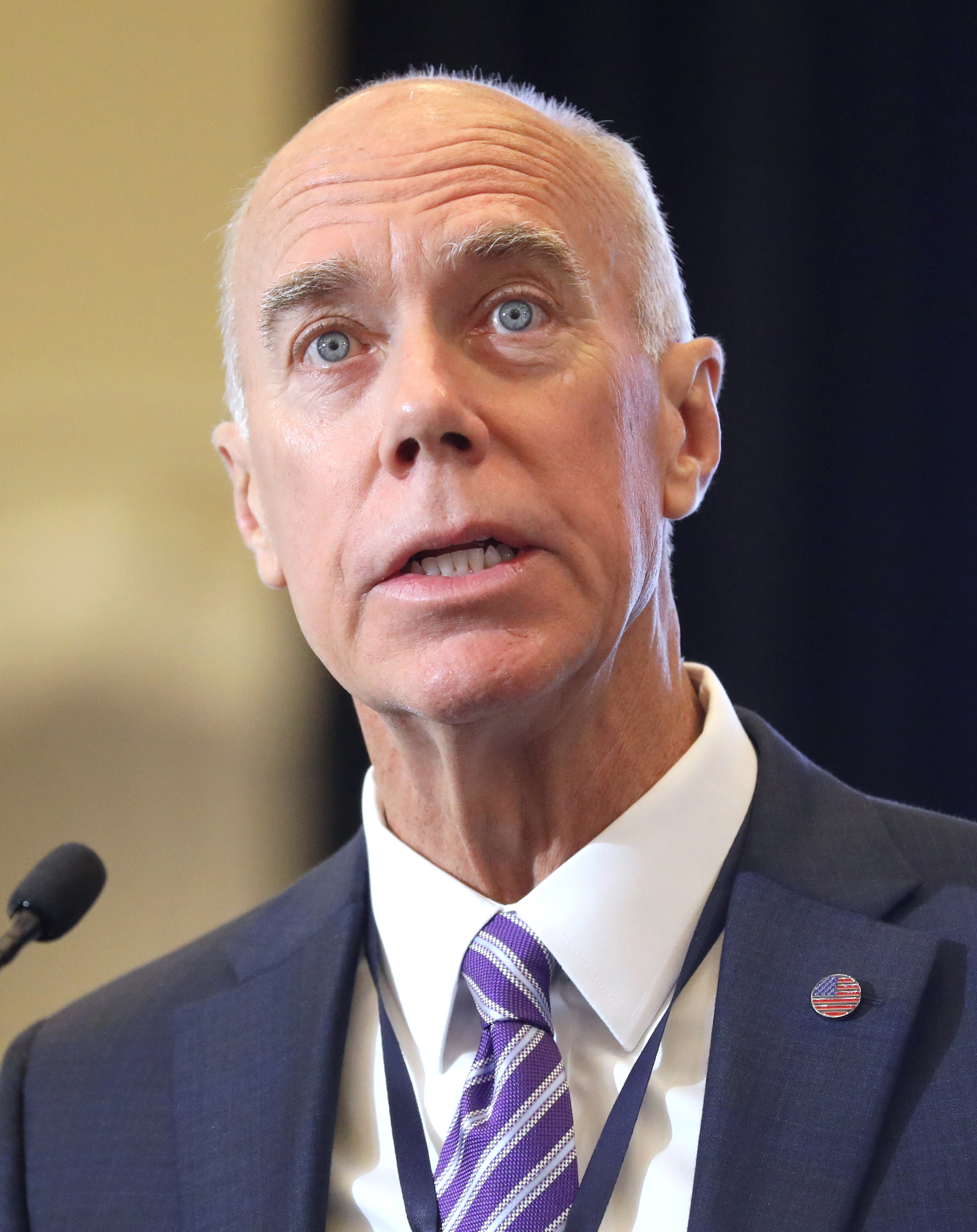

Speaker pro tempore of the Ohio House of Representatives
- In office January 4, 2021 – January 3, 2023
- Preceded by: Jim Butler
- Succeeded by: Scott Oelslager

Member of the Ohio House of Representatives from the 5th district
- In office January 3, 2015 – January 3, 2023
- Preceded by: Nick Barborak
- Succeeded by: Richard Brown (redistricted)

Personal details
- Born: May 25, 1955 (age 71) Shelby, Ohio, U.S.
- Party: Republican
- Spouse: Pam Ginter
- Children: 1
- Education: Mount Vernon Nazarene University

Timothy E. Ginter (born May 25, 1955) is an American politician and minister who served in the Ohio House of Representatives from 2015 to 2023. A member of the Republican Party, he represented the 5th district, which included all of Columbiana County. Ginter was speaker pro tempore of the house from 2021 to 2023. He has served as a Columbiana County commissioner since 2024.

== Career ==
Ginter pursued biblical studies at Nazarene Bible College and later received a bachelor's degree in the discipline from Mount Vernon Nazarene University. He was a pastor at numerous churches in Ohio before and during his political career. In 2006, Ginter placed third in the Republican primary for Ohio's 6th congressional district. He ran against incumbent Democrat Jason Wilson for the Ohio Senate in 2008, but lost.

In 2014, Ginter replaced former representative Craig Newbold as the Republican candidate for the Ohio House of Representatives' 5th district. Ginter went on to defeat incumbent Democrat Nick Barborak in the 2014 general election with 59% of the vote. He was reelected in 2016, 2018, and 2020 before being term-limited. Ginter's district was redistricted to be the 79th district following the 2020 census, and was won by Republican Monica Robb Blasdel in the 2022 Ohio House of Representatives election.

Ginter is a member of the Ohio Farm Bureau, National Rifle Association of America, Buckeye Firearms Association, Salem Chamber of Commerce, an associate member of the Columbiana County Township Association, a member of the Columbiana County Republican Party Central Committee, and served as an appointed member of the Ohio Commission on Fatherhood.

In 2019, Ginter co-sponsored legislation that would ban abortion in Ohio and criminalize what they called "abortion murder". Doctors who performed abortions in cases of ectopic pregnancy and other life-threatening conditions would be exempt from prosecution only if they "[took] all possible steps to preserve the life of the unborn child, while preserving the life of the woman. Such steps include, if applicable, attempting to re-implant an ectopic pregnancy into the woman's uterus". Reimplantation of an ectopic pregnancy is not a recognized or medically feasible procedure.

In 2024, Ginter was elected as a commissioner of Columbiana County, Ohio, and was sworn in later that year.

Ohio House of Representatives
Preceded by Jim Butler	Speaker pro tempore of the Ohio House of Representatives; 2021–2023	Succeeded by Scott Oelslager
