= Senator Gentile =

Senator Gentile may refer to:

- Lou Gentile (born 1979), Ohio State Senate
- Vincent J. Gentile (born 1959), New York State Senate
