= Nick Barborak =

American politician from Ohio

Member of the Ohio House of Representatives from the 5th district
- In office January 7, 2013 – December 31, 2014
- Preceded by: Craig Newbold
- Succeeded by: Tim Ginter

Personal details
- Party: Democratic
- Education: Kent State University, University of Akron School of Law
- Profession: Attorney

Nick Barborak is an American politician who served in the Ohio House of Representatives from 2013 to 2015. A member of the Democratic Party, he represented the 5th district, which included all of Columbiana County.

== Career ==
Barborak was an assistant prosecutor. Before his election to the Ohio House of Representatives, Barborak was treasurer of Columbiana County, Ohio, a position he was first appointed to in 2007 after incumbent Linda Bolon was elected to the Ohio House. He was subsequently elected to a full term.

In November 2011, Barborak announced he would run for Ohio's 5th House District, which encompasses all of Columbiana County, against incumbent Republican Craig Newbold. He defeated Newbold in the election with 50.57% of the vote. Barborak lost re-election in 2014 to Tim Ginter.

Barborak is married and has two children.
