= Senator Hoagland =

Senator Hoagland may refer to:

- Frank Hoagland (fl. 2010s), Ohio State Senate
- Peter Hoagland (1941–2007), Nebraska State Senate
