= Blasdell (surname) =

Blasdell is a surname. Notable people with the surname include:

- Doug Blasdell (1962–2007), American trainer and reality show personality
- Rob Blasdell (born 1970), Canadian lacrosse player
- Robert Ferris Blasdell (1929–1996), botanist

== See also ==
- Blaisdell
- Blasdel
