= Eileen Krupinski =

American politician

Member of the Ohio House of Representatives from the 98th district
- In office January 3, 2001 – December 31, 2002
- Preceded by: Jerry W. Krupinski
- Succeeded by: John Domenick

Personal details
- Born: 1948 or 1949 (age 76–77)
- Party: Democratic
- Spouse: Jerry W. Krupinski

K. Eileen Krupinski (née Bennett; born 1948 or 1949) is a Democratic politician who formerly served in the Ohio House of Representatives. A native of Steubenville, Ohio, Krupinski's husband, Jerry W. Krupinski, served as a state representative for fourteen years, or seven terms. However, when term limits barred him from running again in 2000, Eileen entered the race to succeed him. She won, and was seated on January 3, 2001 in the seat formerly held by her husband.

Up for reelection in 2002, Krupinski faced local weatherman John Domenick in a primary race for the Democratic nomination. Fairly popular, Domenick proved to be a strong contender, and ultimately defeated Krupinski to go on to the general election. As a result, Krupinski served only two years in office as state representative.

Following elected office, Krupinski became greatly involved with the Ohio Federation of Women's Clubs and the Federated Democratic Women of Ohio. She also served as a delegate to Ohio's 6th Congressional District in 2008.
