= Edison School District =

Edison School District may refer to:

- Edison School District (California)
- Edison School District 54JT, Colorado
- Edison Township Public Schools, New Jersey
- Edison Local School District (Jefferson County), Ohio
- Edison Local School District (Erie County), Ohio

== See also ==
- Burlington-Edison School District
- EdisonLearning, formerly known as Edison Schools
