= John Domenick =

American politician

Member of the Ohio House of Representatives from the 95th district
- In office January 3, 2003 – December 31, 2010
- Preceded by: Eileen Krupinski
- Succeeded by: Lou Gentile

Personal details
- Born: January 14, 1946 (age 80) Wheeling, West Virginia
- Party: Democratic
- Profession: Weatherman

John Domenick is a Democratic politician who formerly served in the Ohio House of Representatives. A weatherman with the local CBS station, WTRF for over twenty five years, Domenick opted to seek the Democratic nomination for state representative in 2002 against incumbent Eileen Krupinski. With the help of high named recognition, Domenick won the election. He would ultimately win the general election also, and was sworn into office on January 3, 2003.

Domenick easily won reelection in 2004 and 2006. In 2008, Domenick faced a challenge from former Representative Jerry W. Krupinski, but fended him off to win a final term in the legislature. Following Democrats' rise to the majority in 2009, Domenick was named chairman of the House Agriculture and Natural Resources Committee for the 128th Ohio General Assembly.

Unable to run for another term in 2010 due to term limits, Domenick exited the House in 2010 following four consecutive terms. He was succeeded by Lou Gentile. Domenick has since returned to Smithfield.
