= Jack Cera =

American politician (1955 or 1956 – 2025)

Member of the Ohio House of Representatives from the 96th district
- In office January 3, 2011 – December 31, 2020
- Preceded by: Lou Gentile
- Succeeded by: Ron Ferguson
- In office January 3, 1983 – December 31, 1996
- Preceded by: Bob Ney
- Succeeded by: Charlie Wilson

Personal details
- Born: 1955 or 1956 Bellaire, Ohio, U.S.
- Died: July 13, 2025 (aged 69)
- Party: Democratic
- Spouse: Becky Cera
- Education: Brown University

Jack Cera (1955 or 1956 – July 13, 2025) was an American politician who was a member of the Ohio House of Representatives, representing the 96th district.

== Life and career ==
A Democrat, Cera was appointed to his last term to replace Lou Gentile, who had left to assume a seat in the Ohio Senate. Cera had previously served in the Ohio House of Representatives from 1983 to 1996, but was ineligible to run for another term because of new legislation introducing term limits.

During his service in the House and while out of office, he served as head of the Jefferson–Belmont Regional Solid Waste Authority and in various voluntary positions in Belmont County.

Cera was married, with two daughters. He died on July 13, 2025, at the age of 69.
