= 2006 United States House of Representatives elections in Ohio =

- November 7, 2006

All 18 Ohio seats to the United States House of Representatives
	Majority party	Minority party
Party	Republican	Democratic
Last election	12	6
Seats won	11	7
Seat change	▼1	▲1
Popular vote	1,870,460	2,081,869
Percentage	47.22%	52.55%
Swing	▼3.91%	▲4.04%

Republican
40–50%
50–60%
60–70%
70–80%
Democratic
40–50%
50–60%
60–70%
70–80%
80–90%

The 2006 United States House of Representatives elections in Ohio were held on Tuesday, November 7, 2006 to elect the 18 U.S. representatives from the state of Ohio, one from each of the state's 18 congressional districts. The elections coincided with the elections of other federal and state offices, including a gubernatorial election.

Ohio was one of seven states in which the party that won the state's popular vote did not win a majority of seats in 2006, the other states being Indiana, New Mexico, Nevada, Michigan, Iowa, and Wisconsin.

== Overview ==
United States House of Representatives elections in Ohio, 2006
Party	Votes	Percentage	Seats before	Seats after	+/–
Republican	1,870,460	47.22%	12	11	-1
Democratic	2,081,869	52.55%	6	7	+1
Independent	9,068	0.23%	0	0	-
Totals	3,961,397	100%	18	18	—

== District 1 ==
2006 Ohio's 1st congressional district election
- November 7, 2006
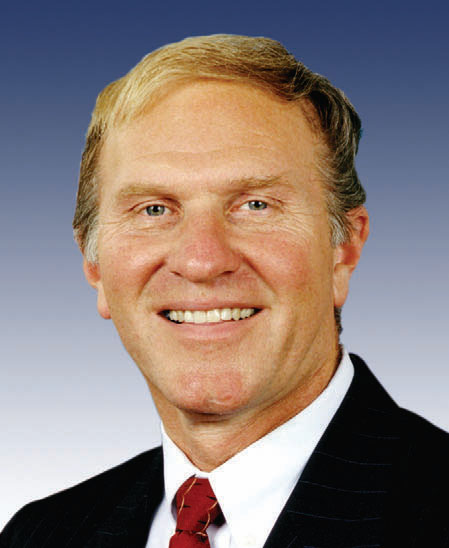

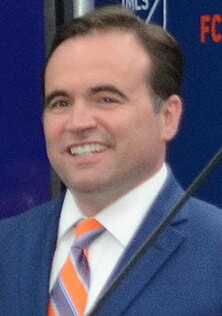
Nominee	Steve Chabot	John Cranley
Party	Republican	Democratic
Popular vote	105,680	96,584
Percentage	52.25%	47.75%
- County results Chabot: 50–60% 60–70%
U.S. Representative before election
Steve Chabot
Republican
Elected U.S. Representative
Steve Chabot
Republican

=== Republican primary ===
==== Candidates ====
===== Nominee =====
- Steve Chabot, incumbent U.S. representative

Republican primary results
Party	Candidate	Votes	%
Republican	Steve Chabot	31,342	100

=== Democratic primary ===
==== Candidates ====
===== Nominee =====
- John Cranley, Cincinnati City Councilman and nominee in 2000

Democratic primary results
Party	Candidate	Votes	%
Democratic	John Cranley	17,344	100

==== Predictions ====
Source	Ranking	As of
The Cook Political Report	Tossup	November 6, 2006
Rothenberg	Tossup	November 6, 2006
Sabato's Crystal Ball	Tilt R	November 6, 2006
Real Clear Politics	Tossup	November 7, 2006
CQ Politics	Tossup	November 7, 2006

=== General election results ===
Ohio's 1st Congressional District election, 2006
Party	Candidate	Votes	%
Republican	Steve Chabot (Incumbent)	105,680	52.25
Democratic	John Cranley	96,584	47.75
Total votes		202,264	100
Republican hold			

== District 2 ==
2006 Ohio's 2nd congressional district election
- November 7, 2006
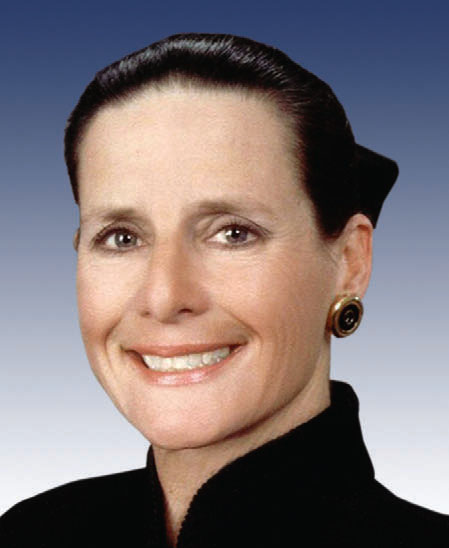

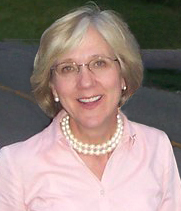
Nominee	Jean Schmidt	Victoria Wells Wulsin
Party	Republican	Democratic
Popular vote	120,112	117,595
Percentage	50.5%	49.4%
- County results Schmidt: 50–60% Wulsin: 50–60% 60–70%
U.S. Representative before election
Jean Schmidt
Republican
Elected U.S. Representative
Jean Schmidt
Republican

=== Republican primary ===
==== Candidates ====
===== Nominee =====
- Jean Schmidt, Incumbent U.S. representative

===== Eliminated in Primary =====
- Bob McEwen, Former U.S. representative and lobbyist
- Deborah A. Kraus
- James E. Constable

===== Results =====
2006 Republican primary results by county Schmidt: 40–50%; 50–60%; McEwen: 40–50%; 50–60%; 60–70%

Republican primary results
Party	Candidate	Votes	%
Republican	Jean Schmidt	33,938	47.67
Republican	Bob McEwen	30,297	42.56
Republican	Deborah A. Kraus	4,433	6.23
Republican	James E. Constable	2,526	3.55
Total votes		71,194	100

=== Democratic primary ===
==== Candidates ====
===== Nominee =====
- Victoria Wells Wulsin, Physician and candidate in 2005

===== Eliminated in Primary =====
- Thor Jacobs, Activist
- Jim Parker, Businessman
- Gaby Downey, Teacher
- Jeff Sinnard, engineering consultant and candidate in 2005

Democratic primary results
Party	Candidate	Votes	%
Democratic	Victoria Wells Wulsin	10,455	36.65
Democratic	Thor Jacobs	6,535	22.91
Democratic	Jim Parker	6,376	22.35
Democratic	Gaby Downey	3,668	12.86
Democratic	Jeff Sinnard	1,489	5.22
Total votes		28,523	100

==== Predictions ====
Source	Ranking	As of
The Cook Political Report	Tossup	November 6, 2006
Rothenberg	Tossup	November 6, 2006
Sabato's Crystal Ball	Tilt D (flip)	November 6, 2006
Real Clear Politics	Tossup	November 7, 2006
CQ Politics	Tossup	November 7, 2006

=== General election results ===
Ohio's 2nd Congressional District election, 2006
Party	Candidate	Votes	%
Republican	Jean Schmidt (Incumbent)	120,112	50.45
Democratic	Victoria Wells Wulsin	117,595	49.39
Independent	Nathan Noy (Write-in)	298	0.13
Independent	James J. Condit, Jr. (Write-in)	76	0.03
Total votes		238,081	100
Republican hold			

== District 3 ==
2006 Ohio's 3rd congressional district election
- November 7, 2006
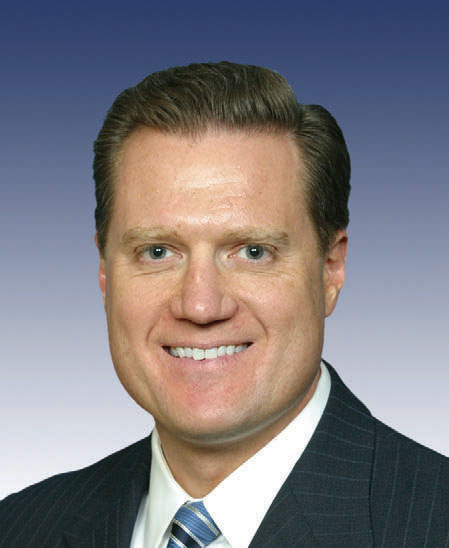

Nominee	Mike Turner	Richard Chema
Party	Republican	Democratic
Popular vote	127,978	90,650
Percentage	58.54%	41.46%
- County results Turner: 50–60% 60–70%
U.S. Representative before election
Mike Turner
Republican
Elected U.S. Representative
Mike Turner
Republican

=== Republican primary ===
==== Candidates ====
===== Nominee =====
- Mike Turner, Incumbent U.S. representative

Republican primary results
Party	Candidate	Votes	%
Republican	Mike Turner	35,511	100

=== Democratic primary ===
==== Candidates ====
===== Nominee =====
- Stephanie Studebaker, veterinarian (withdrew after winning nomination)

===== Eliminated in Primary =====
- Charles W. Sanders, former mayor of Waynesville and perennial candidate
- David J. Fierst

Democratic primary results
Party	Candidate	Votes	%
Democratic	Stephanie Studebaker	12,363	55.99
Democratic	Charles W. Sanders	5,093	23.06
Democratic	David J. Fierst	4,626	20.95
Total votes		22,082	100

Studebaker withdrew her candidacy on August 15, 2006, following an arrest for a domestic dispute with her husband.

A special primary election to fill the vacancy was held on September 15, 2006

=== Special primary results ===
Democratic special primary results
Party	Candidate	Votes	%
Democratic	Richard Chema	5,946	55.99
Democratic	Charles W. Sanders	2,224	23.06
Total votes		8,170	100

==== Predictions ====
Source	Ranking	As of
The Cook Political Report	Safe R	November 6, 2006
Rothenberg	Safe R	November 6, 2006
Sabato's Crystal Ball	Safe R	November 6, 2006
Real Clear Politics	Safe R	November 7, 2006
CQ Politics	Safe R	November 7, 2006

=== General election results ===
Ohio's 3rd Congressional District election, 2006
Party	Candidate	Votes	%
Republican	Mike Turner (Incumbent)	127,978	58.54
Democratic	Richard Chema	90,650	41.46
Total votes		218,628	100
Republican hold			

== District 4 ==
2006 Ohio's 4th congressional district election
- November 7, 2006
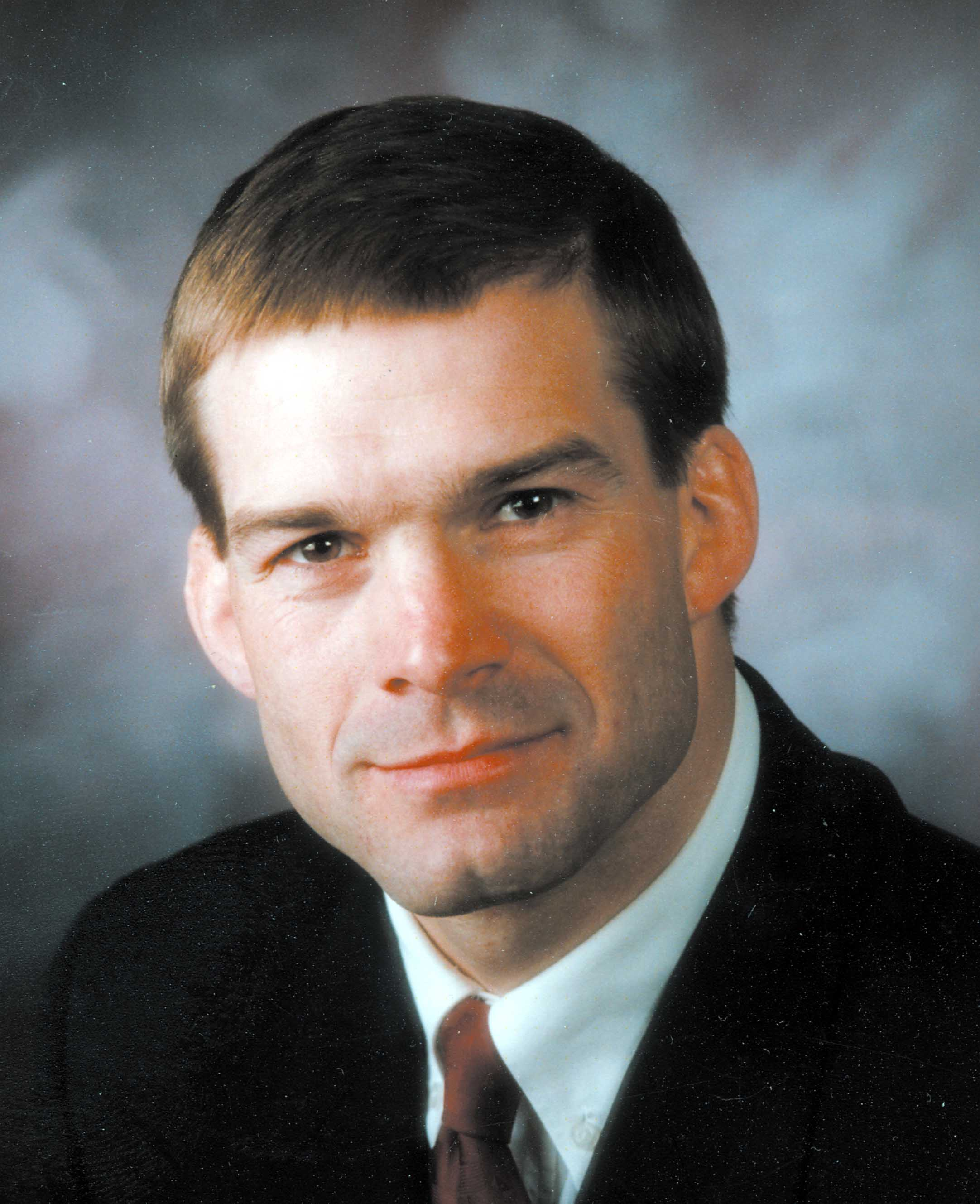

Nominee	Jim Jordan	Richard E. Siferd
Party	Republican	Democratic
Popular vote	129,958	86,678
Percentage	59.99%	40.01%
- County results Jordan: 50–60% 60–70%
U.S. Representative before election
Michael G. Oxley
Republican
Elected U.S. Representative
Jim Jordan
Republican

=== Republican primary ===
==== Candidates ====
===== Nominee =====
- Jim Jordan, state senator

===== Eliminated in Primary =====
- Frank A. Guglielmi, Businessman
- Kevin Nestor
- James R. Stahl, Businessman
- Nathan J. Martin
- Charles W. Weasel

Republican primary results
Party	Candidate	Votes	%
Republican	Jim Jordan	38,017	50.57
Republican	Frank A. Guglielmi	22,504	29.94
Republican	Kevin Nestor	8,460	11.25
Republican	James R. Stahl	2,596	3.45
Republican	Nathan J. Martin	2,358	3.14
Republican	Charles W. Weasel	1,239	1.65
Total votes		75,174	100

=== Democratic primary ===
==== Candidates ====
===== Nominee =====
- Richard E. Siferd, Attorney

Democratic primary results
Party	Candidate	Votes	%
Democratic	Richard E. Siferd	26,591	36.65

=== Endorsements ===
Richard E. Siferd (D)

Individuals

- Wesley Clark, General, 2004 democratic presidential candidate

==== Predictions ====
Source	Ranking	As of
The Cook Political Report	Safe R	November 6, 2006
Rothenberg	Safe R	November 6, 2006
Sabato's Crystal Ball	Safe R	November 6, 2006
Real Clear Politics	Safe R	November 7, 2006
CQ Politics	Safe R	November 7, 2006

=== General election results ===
Ohio's 4th Congressional District election, 2006
Party	Candidate	Votes	%
Republican	Jim Jordan	129,958	59.99
Democratic	Richard E. Siferd	86,678	40.01
Total votes		216,636	100
Republican hold			

== District 5 ==
2006 Ohio's 5th congressional district election
- November 7, 2006
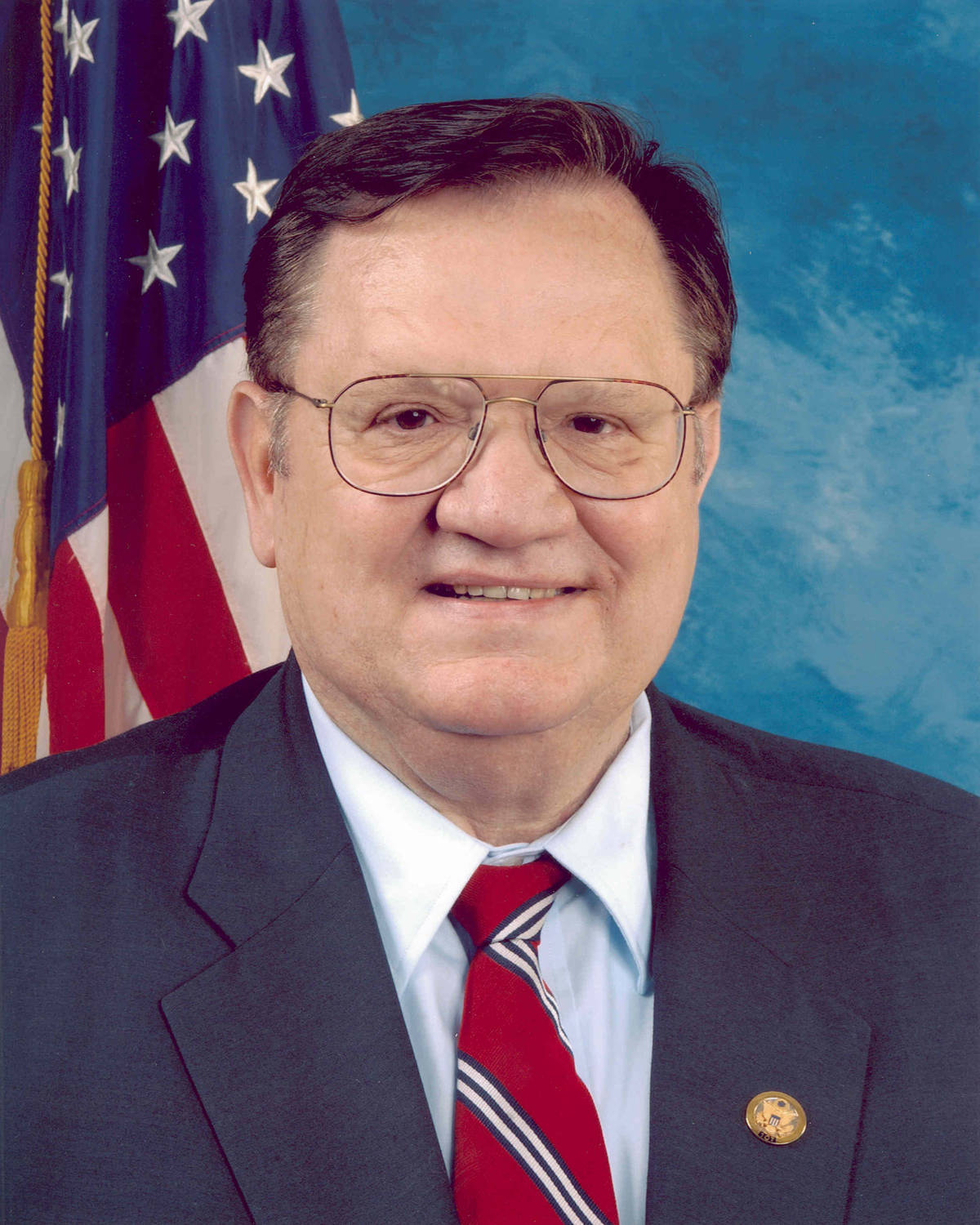

Nominee	Paul Gillmor	Robin Weirauch
Party	Republican	Democratic
Popular vote	129,813	98,544
Percentage	56.85	43.15%
- County results Gillmor: 50–60% 60–70%
U.S. Representative before election
Paul Gillmor
Republican
Elected U.S. Representative
Paul Gillmor
Republican

=== Republican primary ===
==== Candidates ====
===== Nominee =====
- Paul Gillmor, Incumbent U.S. representative

Republican primary results
Party	Candidate	Votes	%
Republican	Paul Gillmor	54,168	100

=== Democratic primary ===
==== Candidates ====
===== Nominee =====
- Robin Weirauch, Public Administrator and nominee in 2004

Democratic primary results
Party	Candidate	Votes	%
Democratic	Robin Weirauch	28,373	100

==== Predictions ====
Source	Ranking	As of
The Cook Political Report	Safe R	November 6, 2006
Rothenberg	Safe R	November 6, 2006
Sabato's Crystal Ball	Safe R	November 6, 2006
Real Clear Politics	Safe R	November 7, 2006
CQ Politics	Safe R	November 7, 2006

=== General election results ===
Ohio's 5th Congressional District election, 2006
Party	Candidate	Votes	%
Republican	Paul Gillmor (Incumbent)	129,813	56.85
Democratic	Robin Weirauch	98,544	43.15
Total votes		228,357	100
Republican hold			

== District 6 ==
2006 Ohio's 6th congressional district election
- November 7, 2006
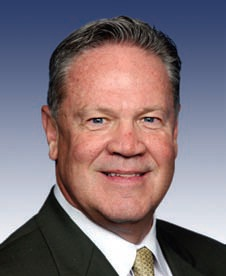

Nominee	Charlie Wilson	Chuck Blasdel
Party	Democratic	Republican
Popular vote	135,628	82,848
Percentage	62.1%	37.9%
- Wilson: 50–60% 60–70% 70–80%
U.S. Representative before election
Ted Strickland
Democratic
Elected U.S. Representative
Charlie Wilson
Democratic

=== Democratic primary ===
==== Candidates ====
===== Nominee =====
- Charlie Wilson (write-in), state senator

===== Eliminated in Primary =====
- Bob Carr, Historic Preservation Specialist and nominee for MI-01 in 1996
- John Stephen Luchansky, truck driver

Democratic primary results
Party	Candidate	Votes	%
Democratic	Charlie Wilson (Write-in)	43,687	66.15
Democratic	Bob Carr	14,900	22.56
Democratic	John Stephen Luchansky	7,459	11.29
Total votes		66,046	100

=== Republican primary ===
==== Candidates ====
===== Nominee =====
- Chuck Blasdel, state representative

===== Eliminated in Primary =====
- Danny Harmon, Noble County Commissioner
- Tim Ginter, minister
- Richard Stobbs

Republican primary results
Party	Candidate	Votes	%
Republican	Chuck Blasdel	18,519	47.31
Republican	Danny Harmon	8,708	22.24
Republican	Tim Ginter	7,606	19.43
Republican	Richard D. Stobbs	4,315	11.02
Total votes		39,148	100

==== Predictions ====
Source	Ranking	As of
The Cook Political Report	Likely D	November 6, 2006
Rothenberg	Safe D	November 6, 2006
Sabato's Crystal Ball	Likely D	November 6, 2006
Real Clear Politics	Safe D	November 7, 2006
CQ Politics	Likely D	November 7, 2006

=== General election results ===
Ohio's 6th Congressional District election, 2006
Party	Candidate	Votes	%
Democratic	Charlie Wilson	135,628	62.08
Republican	Chuck Blasdel	82,848	37.92
Total votes		218,476	100
Democratic hold			

== District 7 ==
2006 Ohio's 7th congressional district election
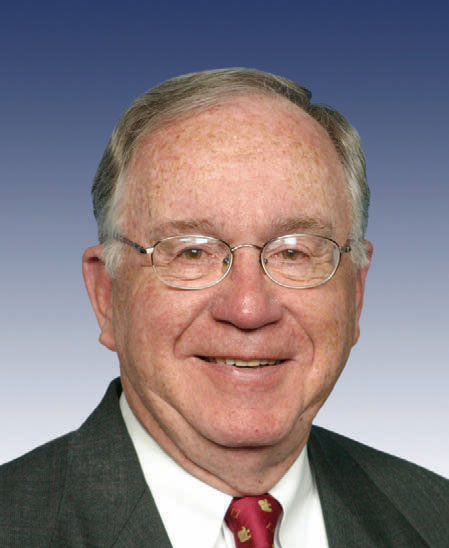

Nominee	Dave Hobson	William R. Conner
Party	Republican	Democratic
Popular vote	137,899	89,579
Percentage	60.6%	39.4%
- County results Hobson: 50–60% 60–70% Conner: 50–60%
U.S. Representative before election
Dave Hobson
Republican
Elected U.S. Representative
Dave Hobson
Republican

=== Republican primary ===
==== Candidates ====
===== Nominee =====
- Dave Hobson, Incumbent U.S. representative

Republican primary results
Party	Candidate	Votes	%
Republican	Dave Hobson	49,808	100

=== Democratic primary ===
==== Candidates ====
===== Nominee =====
- William R. Conner, Air Force Veteran

Democratic primary results
Party	Candidate	Votes	%
Democratic	William R. Conner	20,648	100

==== Predictions ====
Source	Ranking	As of
The Cook Political Report	Safe R	November 6, 2006
Rothenberg	Safe R	November 6, 2006
Sabato's Crystal Ball	Safe R	November 6, 2006
Real Clear Politics	Safe R	November 7, 2006
CQ Politics	Safe R	November 7, 2006

=== General election results ===
Ohio's 7th Congressional District election, 2006
Party	Candidate	Votes	%
Republican	Dave Hobson (Incumbent)	137,899	60.62
Democratic	William R. Conner	89,579	39.38
Total votes		227,478	100
Republican hold			

== District 8 ==
2006 Ohio's 8th congressional district election
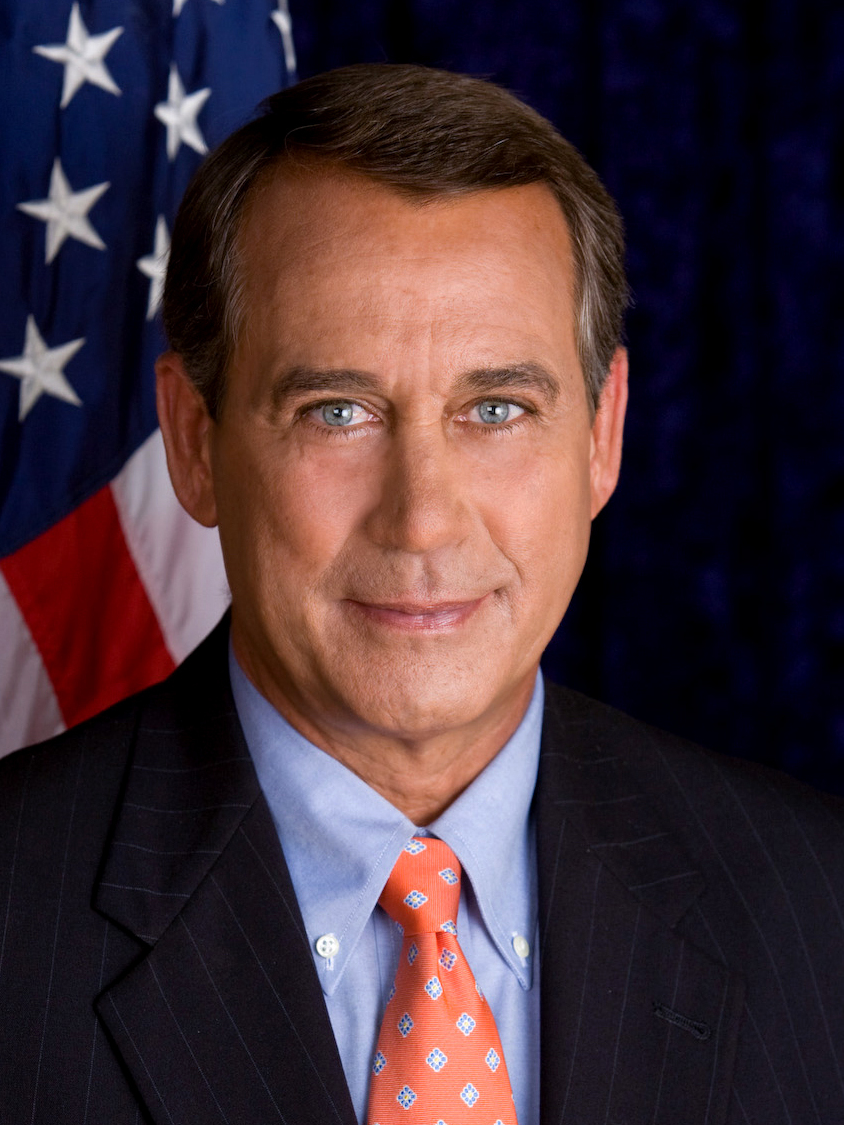

Nominee	John Boehner	Mort Meier
Party	Republican	Democratic
Popular vote	136,863	77,640
Percentage	63.8%	36.2%
- County results Boehner: 50–60% 60–70% 70–80%
U.S. Representative before election
John Boehner
Republican
Elected U.S. Representative
John Boehner
Republican

=== Republican primary ===
==== Candidates ====
===== Nominee =====
- John Boehner, Incumbent U.S. representative

Republican primary results
Party	Candidate	Votes	%
Republican	John Boehner	43,713	100

=== Democratic primary ===
==== Candidates ====
===== Nominee =====
- Mort Meier, Air Force Veteran

Democratic primary results
Party	Candidate	Votes	%
Democratic	Mort Meier	15,277	100

==== Predictions ====
Source	Ranking	As of
The Cook Political Report	Safe R	November 6, 2006
Rothenberg	Safe R	November 6, 2006
Sabato's Crystal Ball	Safe R	November 6, 2006
Real Clear Politics	Safe R	November 7, 2006
CQ Politics	Safe R	November 7, 2006

=== General election results ===
Ohio's 8th Congressional District election, 2006
Party	Candidate	Votes	%
Republican	John Boehner (Incumbent)	136,863	63.80
Democratic	Mort Meier	77,640	36.20
Total votes		214,503	100
Republican hold			

== District 9 ==
2006 Ohio's 9th congressional district election
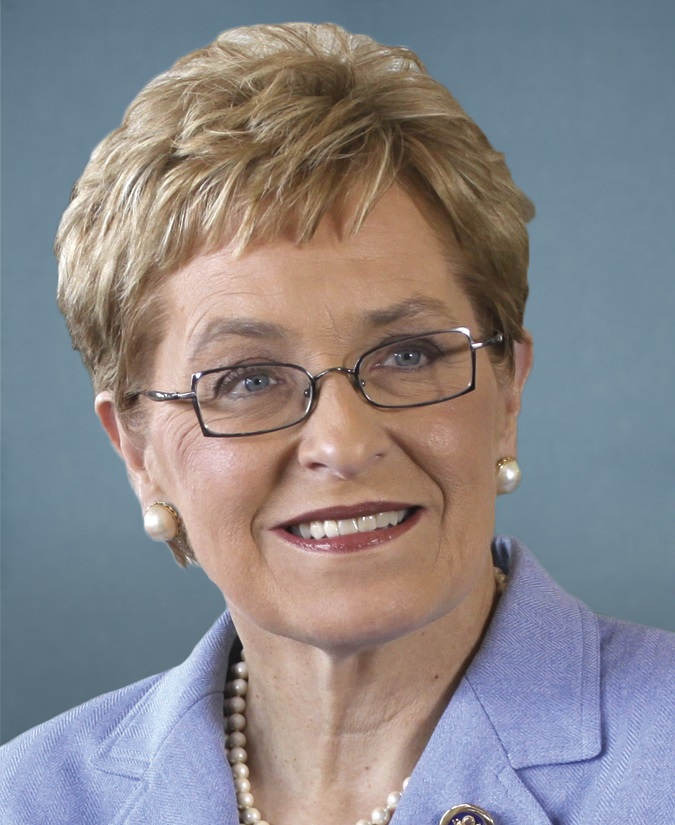

Nominee	Marcy Kaptur	Bradley S. Leavitt
Party	Democratic	Republican
Popular vote	153,880	55,119
Percentage	73.6%	26.4%
- County results Kaptur: 60–70% 70–80%
U.S. Representative before election
Marcy Kaptur
Democratic
Elected U.S. Representative
Marcy Kaptur
Democratic

=== Democratic primary ===
==== Candidates ====
===== Nominee =====
- Marcy Kaptur, Incumbent U.S. representative

Democratic primary results
Party	Candidate	Votes	%
Democratic	Marcy Kaptur	44,234	100

=== Republican primary ===
==== Candidates ====
===== Nominee =====
- Bradley S. Leavitt, Navy Veteran and steelworker
- Ed Emery, Navy Veteran, professor, perennial candidate
- Dirk Kubala

Republican primary results
Party	Candidate	Votes	%
Republican	Bradley S. Leavitt	8,625	40.16
Republican	Ed Emery	6,503	30.28
Republican	Dirk Kubala	6,347	29.56
Total votes		21,475	100

==== Predictions ====
Source	Ranking	As of
The Cook Political Report	Safe D	November 6, 2006
Rothenberg	Safe D	November 6, 2006
Sabato's Crystal Ball	Safe D	November 6, 2006
Real Clear Politics	Safe D	November 7, 2006
CQ Politics	Safe D	November 7, 2006

=== General election results ===
Ohio's 9th Congressional District election, 2006
Party	Candidate	Votes	%
Democratic	Marcy Kaptur (Incumbent)	153,880	73.63
Republican	Bradley S. Leavitt	55,119	26.37
Total votes		208,999	100
Democratic hold			

== District 10 ==
2006 Ohio's 10th congressional district election
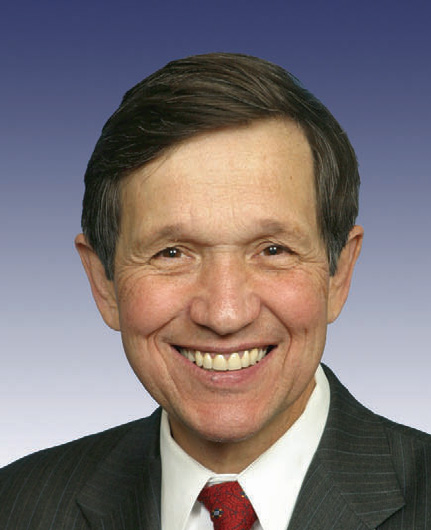

Nominee	Dennis Kucinich	Michael D. Dovilla
Party	Democratic	Republican
Popular vote	138,424	70,008
Percentage	66.4%	33.6%
- County results Kucinich: 60–70%
U.S. Representative before election
Dennis Kucinich
Democratic
Elected U.S. Representative
Dennis Kucinich
Democratic

=== Democratic primary ===
==== Candidates ====
===== Nominee =====
- Dennis Kucinich, Incumbent U.S. representative
- Barbara Ann Ferris, Businesswoman

Democratic primary results
Party	Candidate	Votes	%
Democratic	Dennis Kucinich	51,485	76.42
Democratic	Barbara Ann Ferris	15,890	23.58
Total votes		67,375	100

Republican primary results
Party	Candidate	Votes	%
Republican	Michael D. Dovilla	15,270	65.16
Republican	Jason Werner	8,166	34.84
Total votes		23,436	100

==== Predictions ====
Source	Ranking	As of
The Cook Political Report	Safe D	November 6, 2006
Rothenberg	Safe D	November 6, 2006
Sabato's Crystal Ball	Safe D	November 6, 2006
Real Clear Politics	Safe D	November 7, 2006
CQ Politics	Safe D	November 7, 2006

=== General election results ===
Ohio's 10th Congressional District election, 2006
Party	Candidate	Votes	%
Democratic	Dennis Kucinich (Incumbent)	138,424	66.41
Republican	Michael D. Dovilla	70,008	33.59
Total votes		208,432	100
Democratic hold			

== District 11 ==
2006 Ohio's 11th congressional district election
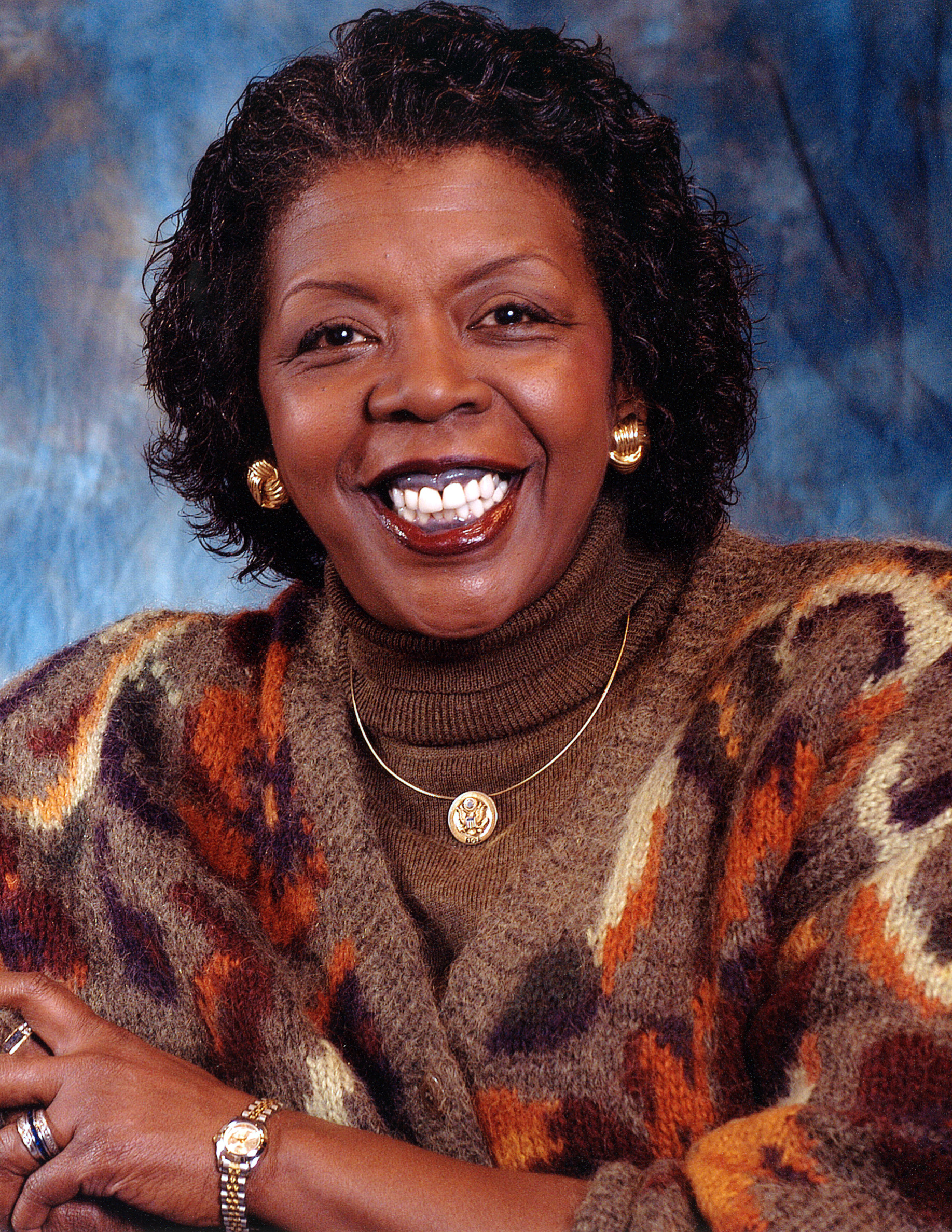

Nominee	Stephanie Tubbs Jones	Lindsey N. String
Party	Democratic	Republican
Popular vote	146,840	29,133
Percentage	83.4%	16.6%
- County results Jones: 80–90%
U.S. Representative before election
Stephanie Tubbs Jones
Democratic
Elected U.S. Representative
Stephanie Tubbs Jones
Democratic

=== Primary results ===
Democratic primary results
Party	Candidate	Votes	%
Democratic	Stephanie Tubbs Jones	55,319	100

Republican primary results
Party	Candidate	Votes	%
Republican	Lindsey N. String	7,556	100

==== Predictions ====
Source	Ranking	As of
The Cook Political Report	Safe D	November 6, 2006
Rothenberg	Safe D	November 6, 2006
Sabato's Crystal Ball	Safe D	November 6, 2006
Real Clear Politics	Safe D	November 7, 2006
CQ Politics	Safe D	November 7, 2006

=== General election results ===
Ohio's 11th Congressional District election, 2006
Party	Candidate	Votes	%
Democratic	Stephanie Tubbs Jones (Incumbent)	146,840	83.44
Republican	Lindsey N. String	29,133	16.56
Total votes		175,973	100
Democratic hold			

== District 12 ==
2006 Ohio's 12th congressional district election
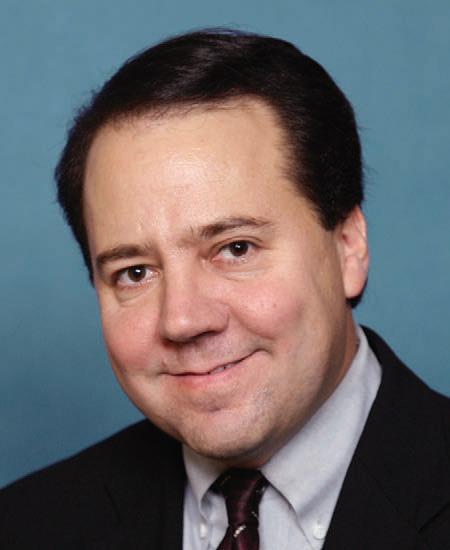

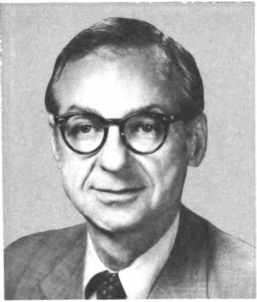
Nominee	Pat Tiberi	Bob Shamansky
Party	Republican	Democratic
Popular vote	145,943	108,746
Percentage	57.3%	42.7%
- County results Shamansky: 50–60% Tiberi: 60–70%
U.S. Representative before election
Pat Tiberi
Republican
Elected U.S. Representative
Pat Tiberi
Republican

=== Primary results ===
Republican primary results
Party	Candidate	Votes	%
Republican	Pat Tiberi	76,457	100

Democratic primary results
Party	Candidate	Votes	%
Democratic	Bob Shamansky	19,387	43.32
Democratic	Patricia J. Shaffer	13,815	30.87
Democratic	Edward S. Brown	6,563	14.67
Democratic	Michael Reilly	4,986	11.14
Total votes		44,751	100

==== Predictions ====
Source	Ranking	As of
The Cook Political Report	Likely R	November 6, 2006
Rothenberg	Lean R	November 6, 2006
Sabato's Crystal Ball	Likely R	November 6, 2006
Real Clear Politics	Safe R	November 7, 2006
CQ Politics	Likely R	November 7, 2006

=== General election results ===
Ohio's 12th Congressional District election, 2006
Party	Candidate	Votes	%
Republican	Pat Tiberi (Incumbent)	145,943	57.30
Democratic	Bob Shamansky	108,746	42.70
Total votes		254,689	100
Republican hold			

== District 13 ==
2006 Ohio's 13th congressional district election
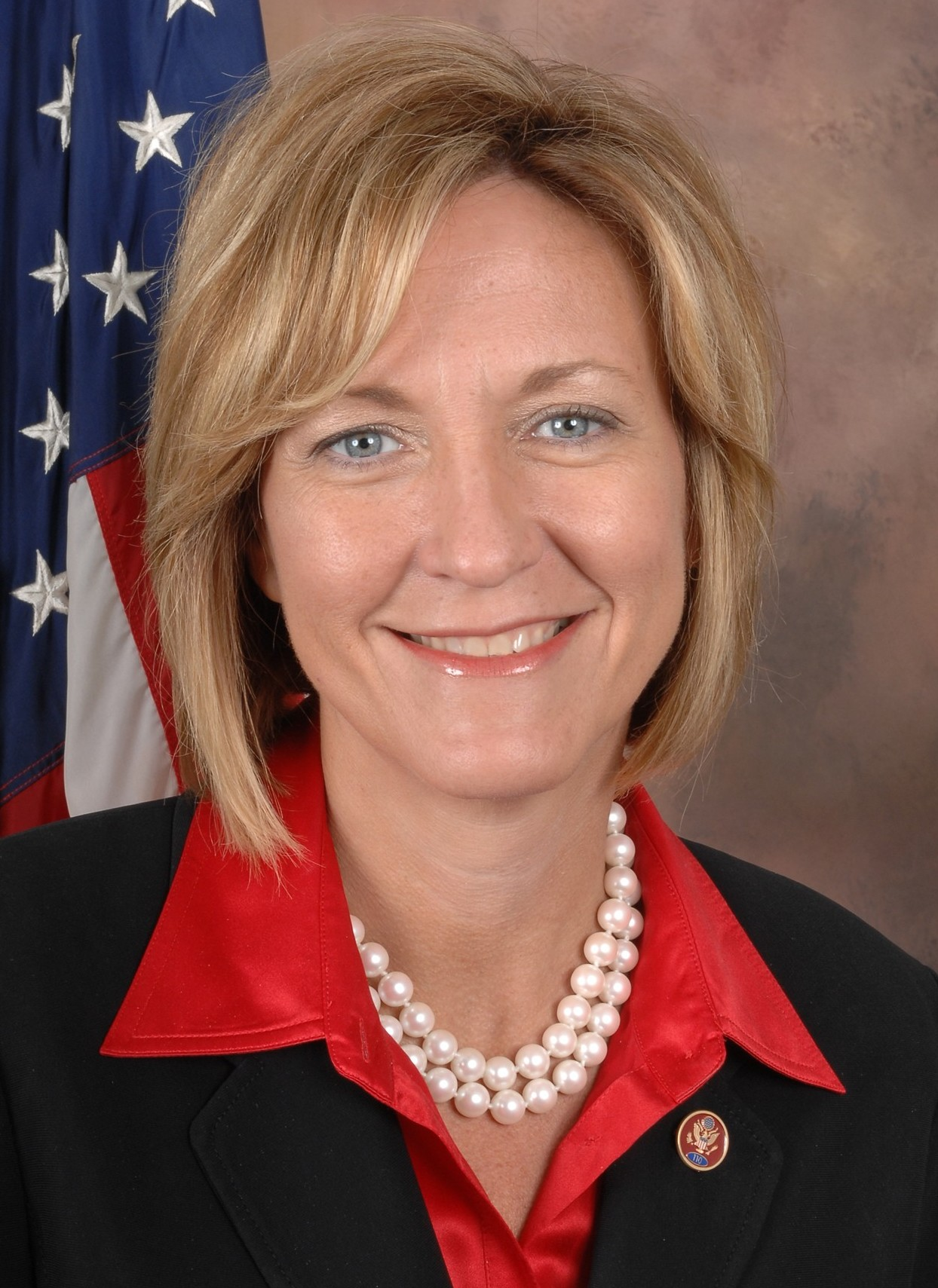

Nominee	Betty Sutton	Craig Foltin
Party	Democratic	Republican
Popular vote	135,643	85,924
Percentage	61.2%	38.8%
- County results Sutton: 50–60% 60–70%
U.S. Representative before election
Sherrod Brown
Democratic
Elected U.S. Representative
Betty Sutton
Democratic

=== Primary results ===
Democratic primary results
Party	Candidate	Votes	%
Democratic	Betty Sutton	21,268	30.86
Democratic	Capri Cafaro	16,915	24.54
Democratic	Thomas C. Sawyer	14,837	21.53
Democratic	Gary Kucinich	9,891	14.35
Democratic	Bill Grace	3,537	5.13
Democratic	Michael Lyons	1,030	1.49
Democratic	John L. Wolfe	949	1.38
Democratic	Norbert G. Dennerll, Jr.	495	0.72
Total votes		68,922	100

Republican primary results
Party	Candidate	Votes	%
Republican	Craig Foltin	12,088	37.46
Republican	David McGrew	7,079	21.94
Republican	Joe Ortega, III	6,536	20.25
Republican	Paul S. Burtzlaff	4,261	13.20
Republican	C.J. DeLorean	2,306	7.15
Total votes		32,270	100

==== Predictions ====
Source	Ranking	As of
The Cook Political Report	Likely D	November 6, 2006
Rothenberg	Safe D	November 6, 2006
Sabato's Crystal Ball	Safe D	November 6, 2006
Real Clear Politics	Safe D	November 7, 2006
CQ Politics	Likely D	November 7, 2006

=== General election results ===
Ohio's 13th Congressional District election, 2006
Party	Candidate	Votes	%
Democratic	Betty Sutton	135,643	61.22
Republican	Craig Foltin	85,924	38.78
Total votes		221,567	100
Democratic hold			

== District 14 ==
2006 Ohio's 14th congressional district election
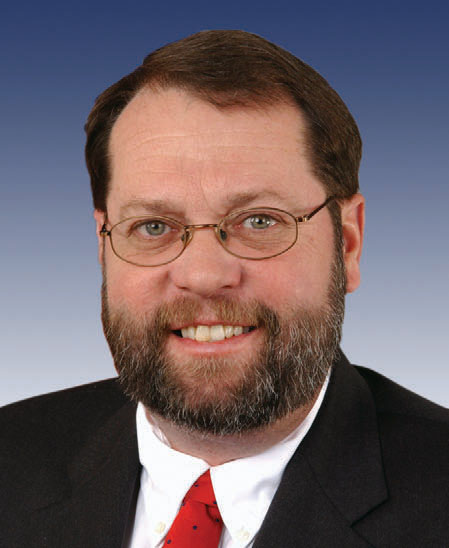

Nominee	Steve LaTourette	Lewis R. Katz
Party	Republican	Democratic
Popular vote	144,069	97,754
Percentage	57.5%	39.0%
- County results Latourette: 40–50% 50–60% 60–70% Katz: 40–50%
U.S. Representative before election
Steve LaTourette
Republican
Elected U.S. Representative
Steve LaTourette
Republican

=== Primary results ===
Republican primary results
Party	Candidate	Votes	%
Republican	Steve LaTourette	38,137	100

Democratic primary results
Party	Candidate	Votes	%
Democratic	Lewis R. Katz	15,401	42.49
Democratic	Dale Virgil Blanchard	11,313	31.21
Democratic	Palmer J. Peterson	9,534	26.30
Total votes		36,248	100

==== Predictions ====
Source	Ranking	As of
The Cook Political Report	Safe R	November 6, 2006
Rothenberg	Safe R	November 6, 2006
Sabato's Crystal Ball	Safe R	November 6, 2006
Real Clear Politics	Safe R	November 7, 2006
CQ Politics	Safe R	November 7, 2006

=== General election results ===
Ohio's 14th Congressional District election, 2006
Party	Candidate	Votes	%
Republican	Steve LaTourette (Incumbent)	144,069	57.55
Democratic	Lewis R. Katz	97,754	39.05
Independent	Werner J. Lange	8,500	3.40
Total votes		250,323	100
Republican hold			

== District 15 ==
2006 Ohio's 15th congressional district election
- November 7, 2006
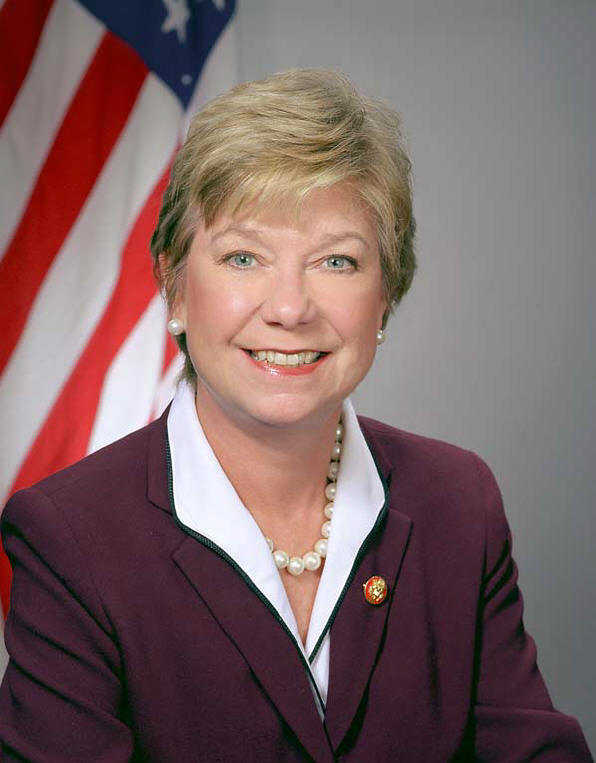

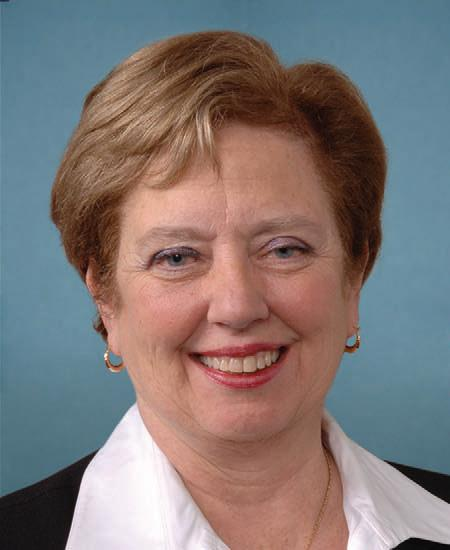
Nominee	Deborah Pryce	Mary Jo Kilroy
Party	Republican	Democratic
Popular vote	110,375	109,673
Percentage	50.2%	49.7%
- County results Pryce: 60–70% Kilroy: 50–60%
U.S. Representative before election
Deborah Pryce
Republican
Elected U.S. Representative
Deborah Pryce
Republican

=== Primary results ===
Republican primary results
Party	Candidate	Votes	%
Republican	Deborah Pryce	44,020	100

Democratic primary results
Party	Candidate	Votes	%
Democratic	Mary Jo Kilroy	27,895	100

==== Predictions ====
Source	Ranking	As of
The Cook Political Report	Tossup	November 6, 2006
Rothenberg	Lean D (flip)	November 6, 2006
Sabato's Crystal Ball	Tilt D (flip)	November 6, 2006
Real Clear Politics	Lean D (flip)	November 7, 2006
CQ Politics	Tossup	November 7, 2006

=== General election results ===
Ohio's 15th Congressional District election, 2006
Party	Candidate	Votes	%
Republican	Deborah Pryce (Incumbent)	110,375	50.20
Democratic	Mary Jo Kilroy	109,673	49.72
Independent	Bill Buckel (Write-in)	194	0.09
Total votes		220,242	100
Republican hold			

== District 16 ==
2006 Ohio's 16th congressional district election
- November 7, 2006
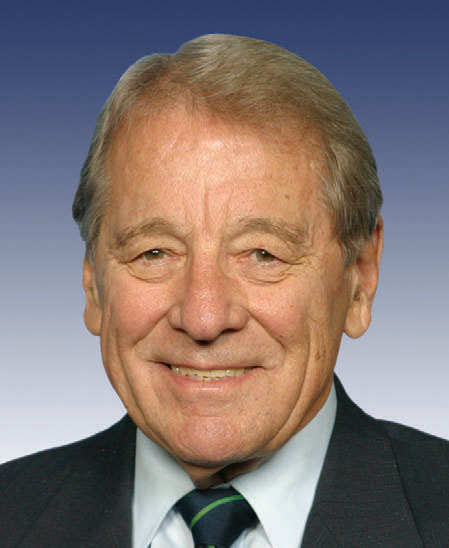

Nominee	Ralph Regula	Thomas Shaw
Party	Republican	Democratic
Popular vote	137,167	97,955
Percentage	58.3%	41.7%
- County results Regula: 50–60% 60–70%
U.S. Representative before election
Ralph Regula
Republican
Elected U.S. Representative
Ralph Regula
Republican

Incumbent representative Ralph Regula ran for re-election. He defeated Democrat Thomas Shaw with over 58% of the vote on election day.

=== Primary results ===
Republican primary results
Party	Candidate	Votes	%
Republican	Ralph Regula	32,526	58.40
Republican	Matt Miller	23,170	41.60
Total votes		55,696	100

Democratic primary results
Party	Candidate	Votes	%
Democratic	Thomas Shaw	20,508	50.76
Democratic	Tom Mason	19,897	49.24
Total votes		40,405	100

==== Predictions ====
Source	Ranking	As of
The Cook Political Report	Safe R	November 6, 2006
Rothenberg	Safe R	November 6, 2006
Sabato's Crystal Ball	Safe R	November 6, 2006
Real Clear Politics	Safe R	November 7, 2006
CQ Politics	Safe R	November 7, 2006

=== General election results ===
Ohio's 16th Congressional District election, 2006
Party	Candidate	Votes	%
Republican	Ralph Regula (Incumbent)	137,167	58.34
Democratic	Thomas Shaw	97,955	41.66
Total votes		235,122	100
Republican hold			

== District 17 ==
2006 Ohio's 17th congressional district election
- November 7, 2006
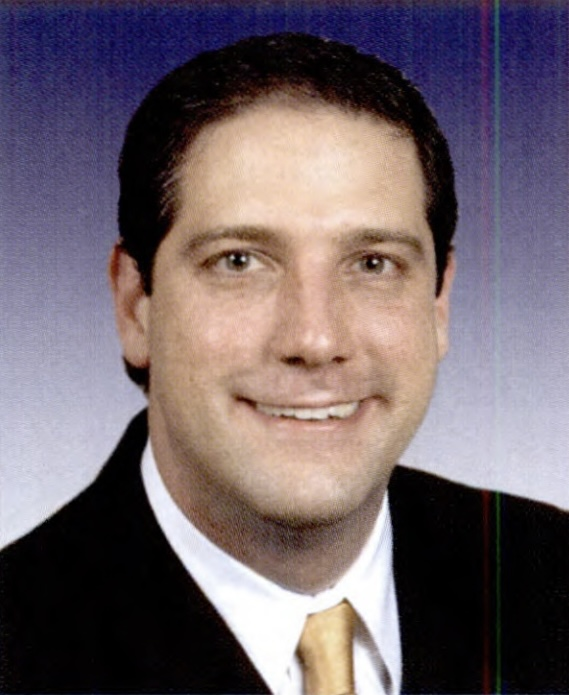

Nominee	Tim Ryan	Don Manning II
Party	Democratic	Republican
Popular vote	170,369	41,925
Percentage	80.25%	19.75%
- County results Ryan: 70–80% 80–90%
U.S. Representative before election
Tim Ryan
Democratic
Elected U.S. Representative
Tim Ryan
Democratic

Incumbent representative Tim Ryan ran for re-election, facing Republican Don Manning II in the general election. Ryan defeated Manning by a wide margin, taking slightly over 80% of the vote.

=== Primary results ===
Democratic primary results
Party	Candidate	Votes	%
Democratic	Tim Ryan	71,532	100

Republican primary results
Party	Candidate	Votes	%
Republican	Don Manning, II (Write-in)	249	100

==== Predictions ====
Source	Ranking	As of
The Cook Political Report	Safe D	November 6, 2006
Rothenberg	Safe D	November 6, 2006
Sabato's Crystal Ball	Safe D	November 6, 2006
Real Clear Politics	Safe D	November 7, 2006
CQ Politics	Safe D	November 7, 2006

=== General election results ===
Ohio's 17th Congressional District election, 2006
Party	Candidate	Votes	%
Democratic	Tim Ryan (Incumbent)	170,369	80.25
Republican	Don Manning II	41,925	19.75
Total votes		212,294	100
Democratic hold			

== District 18 ==
2006 Ohio's 18th congressional district election
- November 7, 2006
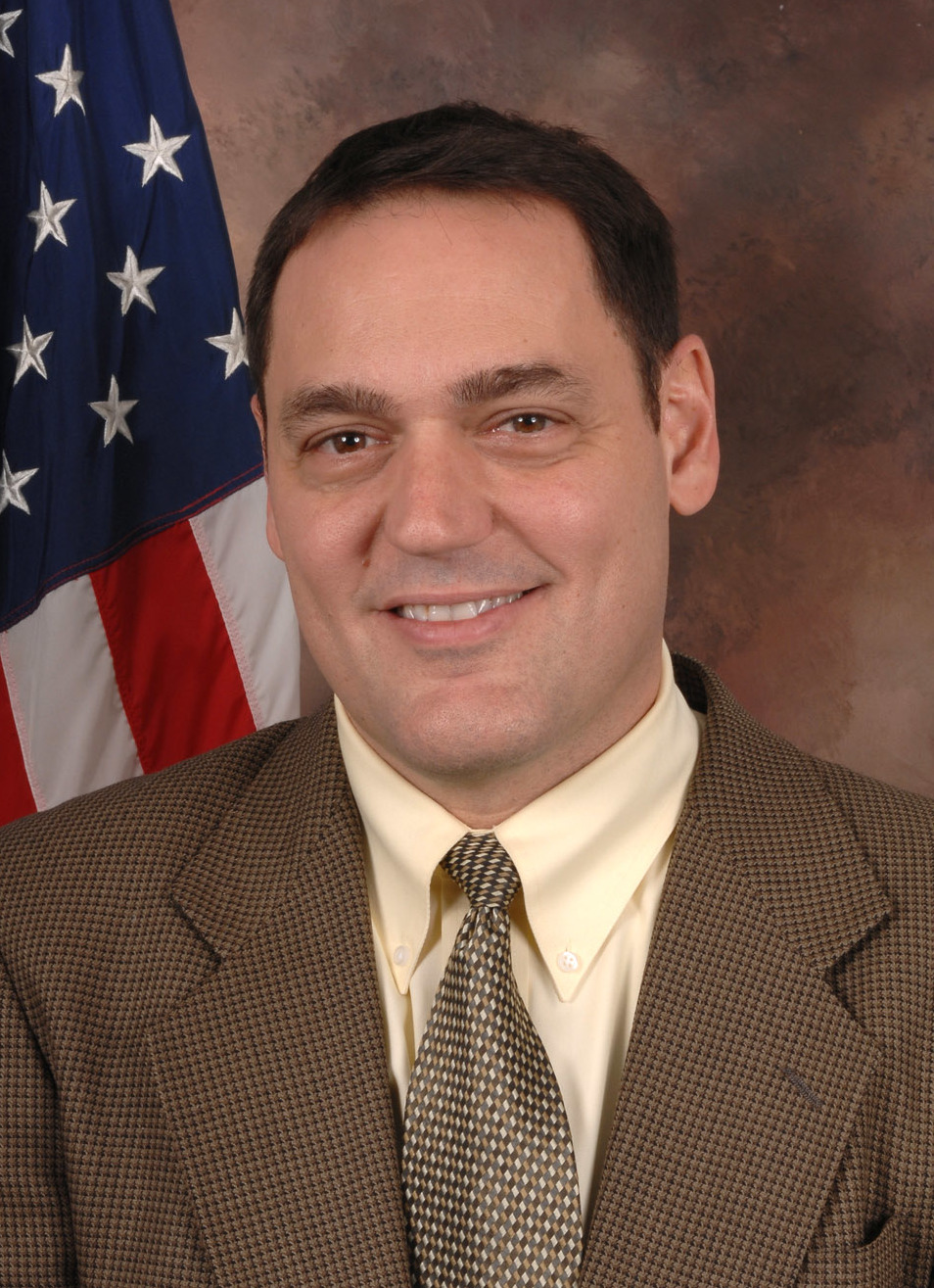

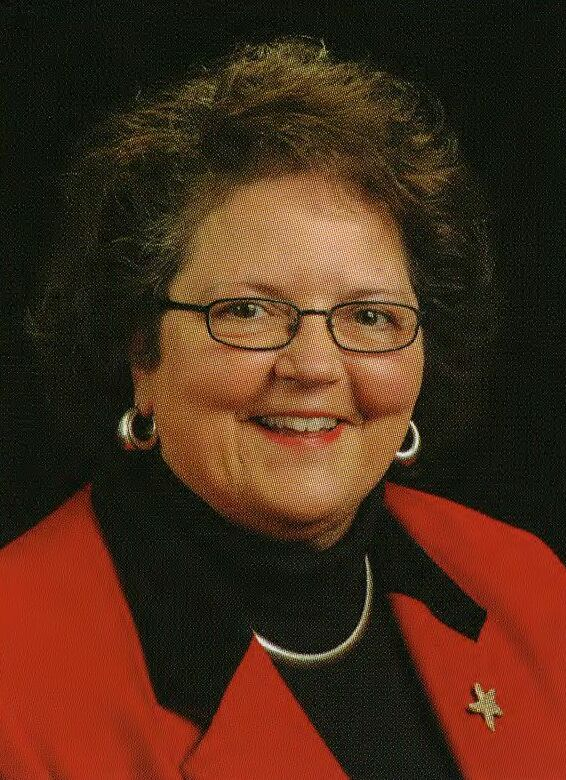
Nominee	Zack Space	Joy Padgett
Party	Democratic	Republican
Popular vote	129,687	79,286
Percentage	62.1%	37.9%
- County results Space: 50–60% 60–70% 70–80% Padgett: 50–60%
U.S. Representative before election
Bob Ney
Republican
Elected U.S. Representative
Zack Space
Democratic

=== Primary results ===
Democratic primary results
Party	Candidate	Votes	%
Democratic	Zack Space	18,251	38.69
Democratic	Jennifer Stewart	12,071	25.59
Democratic	Joe Sulzer	11,340	24.04
Democratic	Ralph A. Applegate	5,514	11.69
Total votes		47,176	100

Republican primary results
Party	Candidate	Votes	%
Republican	Bob Ney	34,515	68.44
Republican	James Brodbelt Harris	15,918	31.56
Total votes		50,433	100

=== Special primary results ===
Republican special primary results
Party	Candidate	Votes	%
Republican	Joy Padgett	9,523	67.71
Republican	James Brodbelt Harris	2,113	15.02
Republican	Ray L. Feikert	1,148	8.16
Republican	Ralph A. Applegate	781	5.55
Republican	Jerry Firman	500	3.55
Total votes		14,065	100

==== Predictions ====
Source	Ranking	As of
The Cook Political Report	Lean D (flip)	November 6, 2006
Rothenberg	Lean D (flip)	November 6, 2006
Sabato's Crystal Ball	Lean D (flip)	November 6, 2006
Real Clear Politics	Lean D (flip)	November 7, 2006
CQ Politics	Lean D (flip)	November 7, 2006

=== General election results ===
Ohio's 18th Congressional District election, 2006
Party	Candidate	Votes	%
Democratic	Zack Space	129,687	62.06
Republican	Joy Padgett	79,286	37.94
Total votes		208,973	100
Democratic gain from Republican			
