= Lou Gentile =

American politician (born 1979)

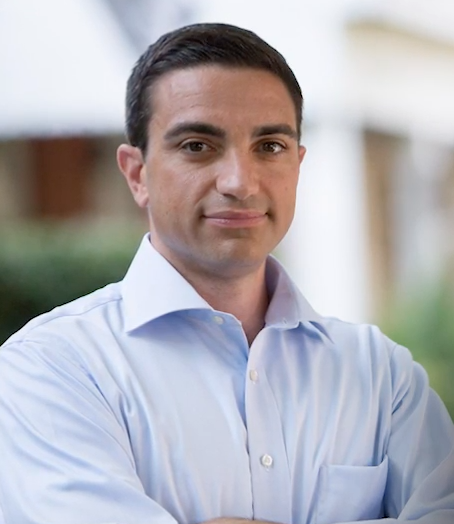

Member of the Ohio Senate from the 30th district
- In office December 15, 2011 – January 5, 2017
- Preceded by: Jason Wilson
- Succeeded by: Frank Hoagland

Member of the Ohio House of Representatives from the 95th district
- In office January 3, 2011 – December 15, 2011
- Preceded by: John Domenick
- Succeeded by: Jack Cera

Personal details
- Born: July 28, 1979 (age 47) Steubenville, Ohio, U.S.
- Party: Democratic
- Education: West Virginia University (BA)

Louis Gentile (born July 28, 1979) is an American politician who served in the Ohio Senate, representing the 30th district from 2011 to 2017. He was also previously a member of the Ohio House of Representatives, serving briefly in 2011 prior to his appointment to the Senate. Gentile served as Assistant Minority Whip in the Ohio Senate and is a member of the Democratic Party.

== Early life and education ==
Gentile was born and raised in Steubenville, Ohio on the Ohio River. He attended Steubenville Catholic Central High School and subsequently West Virginia University, where he earned a Bachelor of Arts degree in Political Science.

== Career ==
After graduation from college, Gentile returned home to Jefferson County and joined the Ted Strickland for Congress campaign as field director. He continued his service with Congressman Strickland by serving as his representative to constituents in Jefferson, Belmont, Noble and Monroe counties.

After Strickland won his election to become Governor of Ohio, Gentile was appointed Assistant Director of the Governor’s Office of Appalachia in January 2007, where he served until 2010.

In 2010, with incumbent Representative John Domenick unable to run again due to term limits, Gentile ran to replace him in the Ohio House. He faced four others in the primary election and received 52.41% of the electorate to win the nomination. Gentile faced Republican Mark Clark in the general election, and won with 66.25% of the vote.

=== Ohio Senate ===
In late 2011, Senator Jason Wilson resigned from his seat in the Ohio Senate to become Director of the Governor's Office of Appalachia under Ohio Governor John Kasich. As a result, Senate Democrats were required to appoint a successor to the seat. Gentile was the Senate Democrats' top pick to fill the position.

It was announced in early December that Gentile had been chosen for Senator Wilson's seat. He was sworn into office on December 15, 2011. Gentile was elected to a full term in the Senate in 2012, defeating Republican Shane Thompson 53% to 47%. This was a significant victory for Gentile, as he had been the GOP's top target and the GOP spent over $1 million to defeat him. Gentile raised about $800,000.

When Senator Joe Schiavoni was named Minority Leader in 2014, Gentile was named as a member of his leadership team, serving as Assistant Minority Whip.

Gentile ran for re-election to the Ohio Senate in 2016, but was defeated in the general election by Republican Frank Hoagland by a margin of 53%-47%.

==== Economy ====
The 30th Senate district encompasses a large portion of Appalachian Ohio. The region's economy is heavily dependent on energy jobs, particularly in the coal industry. As Senator, Gentile secured funding to support energy innovation and job retention in the region. He authored the Ohio Workers First amendment to create the Shale Workforce Report. The report includes information about employment levels of Ohio's workers in the oil and natural gas industry. Gentile also secured $200,000 in funding for scholarships for students at Eastern Gateway Community College who are pursuing a career in the oil and gas industry.

==== Veterans ====
During the 130th General Assembly, Gentile sponsored Senate Bill 13 to provide college credits for certain trainings received by veterans while they served. The bill was used to model what ultimately became the state's method for awarding college credit to veterans.

During the 131st General Assembly, Senator Gentile proposed legislation to provide tax relief to fully disabled veterans. Senate Bill 302, jointly sponsored by Senator Gentile and Minority Leader Joe Schiavoni, would exempt 100% disabled veterans from paying any property tax on their home.

Gentile also introduced Senate Bill, which would provide income tax credits to small businesses that hire unemployed veterans. When his efforts to move S.B. 18 forward were met with opposition, Gentile offered this bill as an amendment to Ohio House Bill 390. When this was unsuccessful, he attempted to amend the same bill on the Senate Floor to include the tax credits proposed in S.B. 18.

==== Seniors ====
Gentile has routinely tried to end the income cap on the homestead exemption, which is a program that gives a property tax break to senior and disabled homeowners. In 2013, The Republican-controlled legislature limited the program, so Ohioans turning 65 who have a household income of more than $30,000 would no longer be eligible for the tax relief.

==== Coal Miners ====
In 2013, the state of Ohio announced that a mine safety training center in Harrison County, Ohio, would be closed and relocated. Senator Gentile worked with Harrison County officials and the United Mine Workers union to keep the facility open. In 2016, due to Gentile's efforts, Ohio approved funding for a new mine safety training center in Harrison County.

Senator Gentile has also joined US Senator Sherrod Brown in calling on Congress to approve the Miners Protection Act and protect retired coal miners' benefits. "Our retired coal miners have worked hard and have earned their pensions and benefits. Congress has an obligation to ensure that the promises made to them are kept." - Senator Lou Gentile

=== Committee assignments ===
- Committee on Rules

== Electoral history ==
Ohio Senate 30th District: Results 2012-2016
Year	Democrat	Votes	Pct	Republican	Votes	Pct
2016	Lou Gentile	75,450	47.10%	Frank Hoagland	84,747	52.90%
2012	Lou Gentile	82,403	52.39%	Shane Thompson	74,884	47.61%

Ohio House of Representatives 95th District: Results 2010
Year	Democrat	Votes	Pct	Republican	Votes	Pct	Independent	Votes	Pct
2010	Lou Gentile	23,213	66.25%	None			Mark Clark	11,824	33.75%
