= John D. Shivers Jr. =

American politician

Member of the Ohio House of Representatives from the 3rd district
- In office January 3, 1983 – May 23, 1990
- Preceded by: John Wargo
- Succeeded by: Sean D. Logan

Personal details
- Party: Democratic
- Education: Bluffton College, University of Dayton

John Shivers is an American politician who served in the Ohio House of Representatives from 1983 to 1990. A member of the Democratic Party, he represented the 3rd district, which included Columbiana County. Prior to his time in the legislature, he served as the clerk at the Columbiana Court of Common Pleas and as an Assistant County Prosecutor.
