= Sean D. Logan =

American politician (born 1966)

Member of the Ohio House of Representatives from the 3rd district
- In office May 23, 1990 – December 31, 2000
- Preceded by: John D. Shivers Jr.
- Succeeded by: Chuck Blasdel

Personal details
- Born: February 11, 1966 (age 60)
- Party: Democratic
- Education: Muskingum University (BA); Capital University (JD)

Sean D. Logan (born February 11, 1966) is an American politician who served as director of the Ohio Department of Natural Resources from 2007 to 2011. A member of the Democratic Party, he was a member of the Ohio House of Representatives from 1990 to 2000.

== Career ==
Logan received a bachelor's degree in political science and speech communication from Muskingum University, and a Juris Doctor from Capital University Law School.

In the Ohio House, Logan's district consisted of a portion of Columbiana County, Ohio. He was succeeded by Republican Chuck Blasdel, and served as a Columbiana County commissioner from 2001 to 2007.

Logan was appointed by Governor Ted Strickland to serve as the director of the Ohio Department of Natural Resources in 2007. As director, he presided over an era where the department saw funding dry up. By 2011, the department had only half the amount appropriated to it as it in 2001. Logan was replaced in 2011 by David Mustine when the Strickland administration concluded.

In 2011, Logan was appointed head of the Muskingum Watershed Conservancy District.
