= Blaisdell =

Blaisdell is a surname. Notable people with the surname include:

- Alfred Blaisdell (1875–1946), politician from North Dakota
- Daniel Blaisdell (1762–1833), politician from New Hampshire
- Frances Blaisdell (1912–2009), musician from New Jersey
- Frank Ellsworth Blaisdell (1862–1946), American professor of surgery and entomologist
- James A. Blaisdell (1867–1957), founder of the Claremont Colleges
- John Blaisdell Corliss (1851–1929), politician from Michigan
- Kealii Blaisdell (born 1972), Kanaka Maoli activist and notable Hawaiian songwriter
- Mike Blaisdell (born 1960), Canadian ice hockey player
- Harriett Blaisdell (born 1924), American businesswoman and philanthropist
- Neal Blaisdell (1902–1975), mayor of Honolulu
  - Neal S. Blaisdell Center, multi-purpose center in Honolulu named after the mayor
- Paul Blaisdell (1927–1983), American artist and special effects creator
- Richard Kekuni Blaisdell (1925–2016), professor of medicine in Honolulu
- Tex Blaisdell (1920–1999), American comics creator
- William Blaisdell (1865–1931), American actor

== See also ==
- Home Building & Loan Ass'n v. Blaisdell, a United States Supreme Court decision upholding a state's mortgage modification law
