= Jim Butler (Ohio politician) =

American politician

Speaker pro tempore of the Ohio House of Representatives
- In office February 6, 2019 – January 4, 2021
- Preceded by: Kirk Schuring
- Succeeded by: Tim Ginter

Member of the Ohio House of Representatives from the 41st district
- In office January 11, 2011 – January 4, 2021
- Preceded by: Peggy Lehner
- Succeeded by: Andrea White

Personal details
- Born: May 10, 1973 (age 53) Cincinnati, Ohio, U.S.
- Party: Republican
- Spouse: Melissa Butler
- Children: 3
- Education: United States Naval Academy (BS); University of Maryland, College Park (MA); University of Cincinnati (JD)

James L. Butler Jr. (born May 10, 1973) is a former Republican member of the Ohio House of Representatives, representing the 41st House District, and was Speaker Pro Tempore.

== Life and career ==
Butler received his bachelor's degree in history with honors and distinction from the United States Naval Academy in 1995, graduating in the top 10% of his class which earned him a spot in flight school. While waiting to begin training he received a master's degree in history from the University of Maryland in 1996. Earning his wings in September 1998, he later flew the F-14 Tomcat as a pilot in the Navy.

Following his naval service, Butler attended the University of Cincinnati College of Law, where he served on law review as one of the top students in his class. He was the President of the Dayton Ballet Associate Board from 2008 to 2011; the Dayton Ballet Associate Board works to support the Dayton Ballet. He is a resident of Oakwood, is married to Dr. Melissa Butler and has three daughters.

== Ohio House of Representatives ==
Following Jon Husted's victory in the Ohio Secretary of State race, Husted resigned from the Ohio Senate. Soon after, Representative Peggy Lehner was chosen to replace him. This caused a vacancy in her former House seat, and Butler was ultimately chosen to serve the remainder of the term. He is eligible to serve in the Ohio House through 2020.

Butler was sworn into the Ohio House of Representatives on January 11, 2011. He chaired the House Judiciary Committee from 2013 to 2016. From 2016 to 2019 Butler served as Chair of the House Civil Justice Committee. Butler is the Dean of the Caucus for the 133rd General Assembly.

On February 6, 2019, Butler was chosen by the Ohio House to serve as Speaker Pro Tempore. He also served as Vice Chair of Rules and Reference Committee.

== Electoral history ==
Election results
Year	Office	Election	Votes for Butler	%	Opponent	Party	Votes	%
2012	Ohio House of Representatives	General	34,707	59.55%	Caroline Gentry	Democrat	23,572	40.45%
2014	Ohio House of Representatives	General	24,300	67.90%	Wayne E. Small	Democrat	11,490	32.10%
2016	Ohio House of Representatives	General	37,157	63.15%	Jimmy Calhoun	Democrat	21,680	36.85%
2018	Ohio House of Representatives	General	28,461	54.89%	John McManus	Democrat	23,387	45.11%

Ohio House of Representatives
Preceded by Kirk Schuring	Speaker pro tempore of the Ohio House of Representatives; 2019–2021	Succeeded by Tim Ginter
