= Jerry W. Krupinski =

American politician (1941–2024)

Jerry Krupinski

Member of the Ohio House of Representatives from the 98th district
- In office January 2, 1987 – December 31, 2000
- Preceded by: Arthur Bowers
- Succeeded by: Eileen Krupinski

Personal details
- Born: February 27, 1941 Adena, Ohio, U.S.
- Died: July 22, 2024 (aged 83)
- Party: Democratic

Jerry Krupinski (February 27, 1941 – July 22, 2024) was a Democratic American politician who served in the Ohio House of Representatives from 1987 to 2000. A native of Steubenville, Ohio, Krupinski initially was elected to the Ohio House following the retirement of longtime Representative Arthur Bowers in 1986.

By 1990, he was serving as the chairman of the House Public Utilities Committee, a capacity he would serve in until Democrats lost the majority in 1994.

With term limits enacted in 1992, Krupinski was unable to run for another term in 2000. However, his wife, Eileen Krupinski, entered the race to succeed him, and ultimately won. In all, Krupinski served fourteen years, or seven full terms, as a state representative.

In 2004, Krupinski was mentioned as a potential successor to term limited Senator Greg DiDonato, He entered a primary race for the seat, but ultimately lost to Charlie Wilson, who would go on to win the general election. He also ran against John Domenick for his former Ohio House seat in 2008, however lost that primary also.

Krupinski died on July 22, 2024 at the age of 83.
