= Linda Bolon =

American politician

Linda S. Bolon
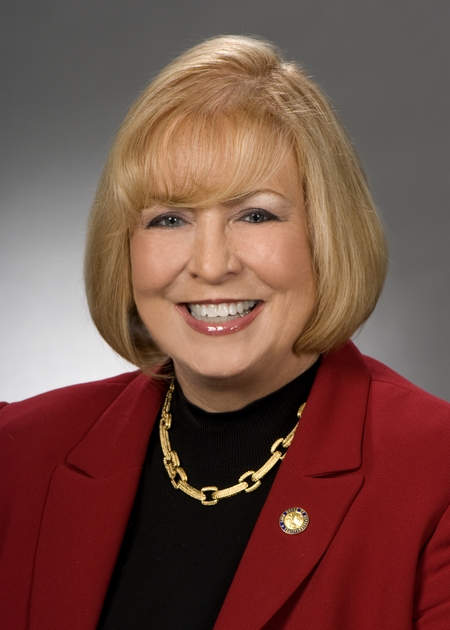

Member of the Ohio House of Representatives from the 1st district
- In office January 2, 2007 – December 31, 2010
- Preceded by: Chuck Blasdel
- Succeeded by: Craig Newbold

Personal details
- Born: June 22, 1948 (age 78) Cleveland, Ohio, U.S.
- Party: Democratic
- Education: Columbus University

Linda S. Bolon (born June 22, 1948) is an American politician who served in the Ohio House of Representatives from 2007 to 2010. A member of the Democratic Party, she represented the 1st district, which included all of Columbiana County.

== Career ==
Bolon received degrees in secretarial sciences and business administration from Columbus University. She worked as an accountant in the private sector and later served as treasurer of Edison Local School District and East Palestine City School District. She also worked with the office of Ohio State Auditor from 1985 to 1999.

Bolon was elected to the city council of East Palestine, Ohio in 1995. In 1999, she was appointed treasurer of Columbiana County, Ohio and was subsequently elected to two additional terms in that office. In 2006, Bolon sought the open seat for the 1st district in the Ohio House of Representatives, where she defeated Republican nominee and county commissioner Jim Hoppel. She won reelection in 2008, defeating Republican nominee Caroline Hergenrother. Bolon was defeated by Republican Craig Newbold in 2010.

Bolon was the assistant majority whip in the 128th Ohio General Assembly, from 2009 to 2010. She was a member of the committees in Finance and Appropriations; Local and Municipal Government; Urban Revitalization; and Ways and Means. After leaving the Ohio House of Representatives, Bolon again served as Columbiana County treasurer from 2013 to 2021.
