= Frank Hoagland =

American politician

Member of the Ohio Senate from the 30th district
- In office January 5, 2017 – December 1, 2023
- Preceded by: Lou Gentile
- Succeeded by: Brian Chavez

Personal details
- Party: Republican
- Profession: Small business owner Legislator

Military service
- Branch/service: United States Navy
- Rank: Senior chief petty officer

Frank Hoagland is an American businessman and former politician who served in the Ohio Senate from 2017 to 2023, representing the 30th district. He owns Special Tactics and Rescue Training LLC, a security training provider, based in Mingo Junction, Ohio. Hoagland previously served in the United States Navy as a Navy SEAL. He is a member of the Republican Party.

== Campaign contributions and House Bill 6-related entities ==
=== 2017-2020 HB6 era ===
Campaign finance filings from the Ohio Secretary of State show that Frank Hoagland’s campaign committee received contributions from multiple energy and utility-related political action committees during the period surrounding House Bill 6, later central to the Ohio nuclear bribery scandal. Documented contributions included $5,000 from Gulfport Energy; $1,000 from Duke Energy; $1,000 from NiSource Inc.; $1,500 from EQT Corporation; $1,000 from Marathon Petroleum Corporation; $500 from ExxonMobil; and $1,000 from Ohio Coal. Contributions were also received from rural electrification groups, including Ohio ACRE, totaling $1,200 across multiple entries.

Additional contributions were received from political organizations active in Ohio’s campaign finance network during the same period, including $12,707.79 from ACT Ohio Foundation across multiple contributions between 2017 and 2019 and $5,500 from Political Education Patterns.

During the same period, Hoagland participated in legislative actions related to House Bill 6. Hoagland was listed among the yeas when the Ohio Senate voted on House Bill 6 in 2019. Subsequent legislative actions repealed portions of the law, including provisions related to nuclear generation subsidies; however, other elements of the statute remained in effect, including support mechanisms for certain coal-fired power plants and related charges collected from Ohio ratepayers.

=== 2020-2026 Campaign finance ===
Campaign finance filings from the Ohio Secretary of State show that committees associated with Frank Hoagland reported contributions and expenditures across multiple election cycles from 2020 through 2026.

Itemized filings show that Hoagland’s campaign committees received contributions from political action committees (PACs) associated with business, industry, and trade organizations active in Ohio politics.

Based on publicly reported committee assignments, these contributions include support from sectors that correspond to policy areas addressed by committees on which Hoagland has served, including energy, insurance and financial services, and agriculture-related interests.

== Ohio Senate ==
Hoagland challenged incumbent state Senator Lou Gentile in the 2016 general election for Ohio's 30th Senate District, which spans ten counties. He was unopposed for the Republican nomination. Hoagland defeated Gentile by a margin of 53%-47% in the November 8, 2016 general election.

=== Committee assignments ===
According to Ballotpedia, Frank Hoagland has served on multiple Ohio Senate committees across legislative sessions, including leadership roles as chair and vice chair.

2023–2024

- Community and Family Advancement Committee (decommissioned), Vice Chair
- Insurance Committee
- Transportation Committee
- Veterans and Public Safety Committee, Chair

2021–2022

- Energy and Public Utilities Committee
- General Government Committee
- Government Oversight and Reform Committee
- Transportation Committee
- Veterans and Public Safety Committee, Chair

2019–2020

- Agriculture Committee, Chair
- Government Oversight and Reform Committee
- Local Government, Public Safety, and Veterans Affairs Committee
- Transportation, Commerce, and Workforce Committee
- Energy and Public Utilities Committee
- General Government and Agency Review Committee

2017 legislative session

- Agriculture Committee, Vice Chair
- Energy and Natural Resources Committee
- Local Government, Public Safety, and Veterans Affairs Committee
- Transportation, Commerce, and Workforce Committee

== Military and business career ==
Hoagland enlisted in the United States Navy in 1982. In 1985, Hoagland volunteered for and received orders to Basic Underwater Demolition/SEAL training (BUD/S) at Naval Amphibious Base Coronado. After six months of training, Hoagland graduated with BUD/S class 134 in September 1985. Following SEAL Basic Indoctrination and completion of a six-month probationary period, he received the Navy Enlisted Classification (NEC) 5326 as a Combatant Swimmer (SEAL), entitled to wear the Special Warfare Insignia. Hoagland served with SEAL Team Four in Central America and later served with Naval Special Warfare Development Group (commonly known as SEAL TEAM SIX or NSWDG) at Dam Neck, Virginia as assaulter, breacher and maritime high-speed assault crafts expert. After leaving the navy in 2004, he became a military contractor and worked on personal security details. In 2005, he founded Special Tactics and Rescue Training (START) LLC, which provides specialized security services and training to national security, law enforcement, and private entities.

== Electoral history ==
Ohio Senate 30th District: Results 2016
Year	Democrat	Votes	Pct	Republican	Votes	Pct
2016	Lou Gentile	75,450	47.10%	Frank Hoagland	84,747	52.90%
