= Monica Robb Blasdel =

American politician

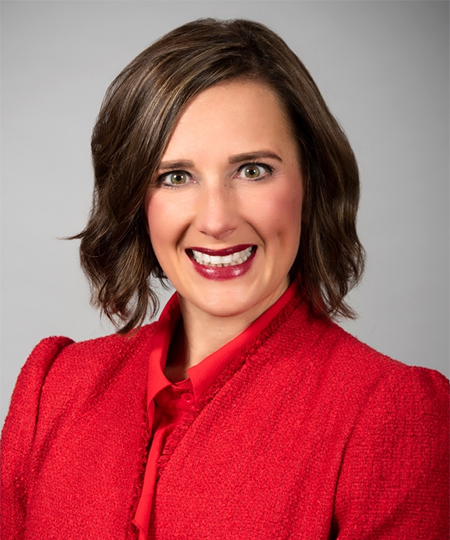

Member of the Ohio House of Representatives from the 79th district
- Incumbent
- Assumed office January 1, 2023
- Preceded by: Tim Ginter (redistricting)

Personal details
- Born: Columbiana County, Ohio, U.S.
- Party: Republican
- Education: University of Akron (BS)

Monica Robb Blasdel is an American politician who has served in the Ohio House of Representatives since 2023. A member of the Republican Party, she represents the 79th district, which includes all of Carroll County and part of Columbiana County.

== Career ==
Robb Blasdel is from Columbiana County, Ohio. She graduated from Crestview High School and received a bachelor's degree in business administration from the University of Akron in 2005. She worked in marketing and sales before joining the office of the Lieutenant Governor of Ohio in 2011.

Robb Blasdel first ran in the 2022 Ohio House of Representatives election, where she won with 74% of the vote to replace Republican Tim Ginter after redistricting. She was reelected in 2024 with 74% of the vote.

=== Committee assignments ===
As of June 2026, Robb Blasdel serves on the following committees in the Ohio House.

- Natural Resources (chair)
- Arts, Athletics, and Tourism
- Energy
- Redistricting
- Transportation

== Personal life ==
Robb Blasdel is the daughter of Ohio Seventh District Court of Appeals judge Carol Ann Robb. She is married to former state representative Chuck Blasdel, and they have two daughters.
