= Chuck Blasdel =

American politician

Member of the U.S. House of Representatives from Ohio's 1st district
- In office January 3, 2001 – December 31, 2006
- Preceded by: Sean D. Logan
- Succeeded by: Linda Bolon

Personal details
- Party: Republican
- Spouse: Monica Robb Blasdel
- Education: Ohio Valley Business College (AA)

Chuck Blasdel (born 1971) is an American politician who served in the Ohio House of Representatives from 2001 to 2006. A member of the Republican Party, he represented the 1st district, which included all of Columbiana County. Blasdel was speaker pro tempore of the house from 2005 to 2006. He was the Republican nominee for U.S. Congress in Ohio's 6th congressional district in 2006.

== Career ==
Blasdel was born in Akron, Ohio. He received an associate's degree in accounting from Ohio Valley Business College in East Liverpool, Ohio. Blasdel runs his own investment adviser firm, Blasdel Financial Group, and has property holdings in eastern Ohio.

In 2000, Blasdel defeated Democrat John Wargo for the open Ohio House of Representatives seat in Columbiana County, Ohio, (then called the 3rd district before being redistricted as the 1st district in 2001) that had been served for more than a decade by a Democrat. In 2002, Blasdel won reelection over Democratic challenger Frank Rivelle. In 2004, Blasdel had a tougher race, beating Frank Rayl by just 1 percentage point. Blasdel did not run again in 2006, opting to run for the U.S. House of Representatives instead, and was succeeded by Democrat Linda Bolon in the 1st district.

During his time in the Ohio House of Representatives, Blasdel was the second-ranking Republican and one of its leading conservatives. Blasdel rose to his position in just his third two-year term. According to the Associated Press, he did it by raising more money than anyone except Republican Jon Husted, the House speaker.

=== 2006 U.S. House of Representatives campaign ===
Blasdel ran in the 2006 United States House of Representatives elections in Ohio. He won 47.31% of the vote in a four-way primary to become the Republican nominee for Ohio's 6th congressional district, where incumbent Democrat Ted Strickland was not running for reelection (Strickland instead successfully ran for governor of Ohio). Blasdel was defeated by Democratic nominee Charlie Wilson in the November general election, where he received 37.92% of the vote.

== Political positions ==
In an interview in August 2006, Blasel said "I very consistently support pro-life positions. ...I supported the Constitutional Amendment to outlaw gay marriage in Ohio. ...I think tax issues are important, but I think one of the biggest challenges we face in Ohio is that our regulatory agencies are completely out of control. I have a very strong track record of standing up against the EPA, some of the bureaucrats in Columbus... some of our regulatory agencies. I even put in writing to the Governor of Ohio that I thought the EPA in Ohio was engaged in...legalized extortion against the business community."

== Personal life ==
Blasdel is married to state representative Monica Robb Blasdel. In 2025, an attempted robbery and assault occurred against Blasdel and his family at their home.
