= Craig Newbold =

American politician

Member of the Ohio House of Representatives from the 1st district
- In office January 3, 2011 – January 7, 2013
- Preceded by: Linda Bolon
- Succeeded by: Nick Barborak

Personal details
- Born: July 31, 1948 (age 78) East Liverpool, Ohio
- Party: Republican
- Education: East Liverpool High School
- Profession: Software executive

Craig Newbold (born July 31, 1948) is an American politician who served in the Ohio House of Representatives from 2011 to 2013. A member of the Republican Party, he represented the 1st district, which included all of Columbiana County.

== Life and career ==
A native of East Liverpool, Ohio, he later went forth to become an executive in the software development industry, where he ultimately started a business in Seattle, Washington. Following his retirement from this industry, he opted to return to his native Columbiana County, Ohio.

Newbold later went forth to establish a not-for-profit information technology training program which allows individuals to develop specific skills in the industry.

== Ohio House of Representatives ==
In 2010, Newbold opted to run against Representative Linda Bolon who was opting to take her third term in the Ohio House of Representatives. While Bolon was initially strongly favored and not expected to face significant opposition, Newbold began to gain ground, notably due to a strong anti-incumbent sentiment. In an upset, he would go on to win the election, with 52.58% of the electorate.

On January 3, 2011, Newbold was sworn into his first term. He served on the committees of Commerce, Labor and Technology (as vice chair); Education; and Finance and Appropriations and the Higher Education Subcommittee.

In 2012, Newbold lost reelection to a second term to Nick Barborak, 51% to 49%.
