= Edison School District (California) =

K–8 public school district in Kern county

Location
- Edison, California United States

District information
- Type: Public school district
- Motto: Dedicated to Students - Committed to Excellence
- Grades: K–8
- Superintendent: Erica Andrews
- Schools: 2
- Budget: $12 M
- NCES District ID: 0611940

Students and staff
- Students: 1,012
- Teachers: 48.0 (FTE)
- Staff: 52.6 (FTE)
- Student–teacher ratio: 21.08:1

Other information
- Schedule: Nine-month
- Website: www.edison.k12.ca.us

The Edison School District is a K–8 public school district in Edison, California. The district has two schools and serves Edison.
