= Jason Wilson (politician) =

American politician (born 1968)

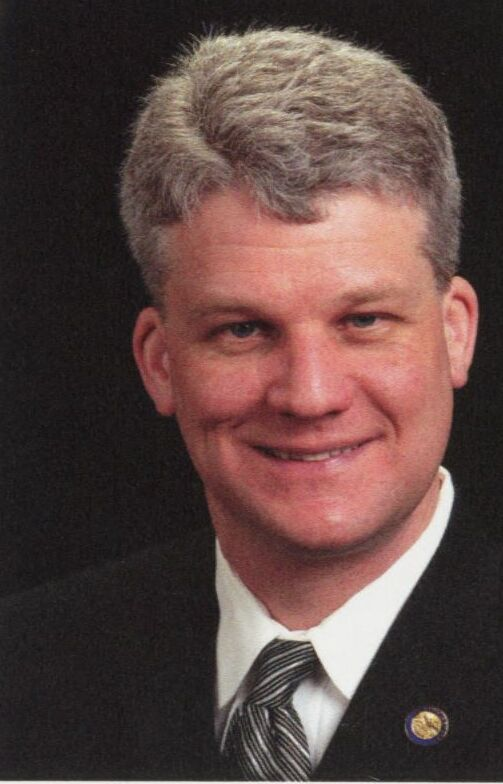

Member of the Ohio Senate from the 30th district
- In office January 2, 2007 – November 18, 2011
- Preceded by: Charlie Wilson
- Succeeded by: Lou Gentile

Personal details
- Born: August 12, 1968 (age 58) Martins Ferry, Ohio, U.S.
- Party: Democratic
- Spouse: Leah Wilson
- Relations: Charlie Wilson (father)
- Education: Ohio State University (BA); Wheeling Jesuit University (MBA)

Jason H. Wilson (born August 12, 1968) is an American politician who served as a member of the Ohio Senate, representing the 30th district from 2007 to 2011. He also served as the director of the Governor's Office of Appalachia during the administration of Governor John Kasich. Wilson is the son of former Ohio Senator and United States Congressman Charlie Wilson.

== Early life ==
Wilson was born August 12, 1968, in Martins Ferry, Ohio. He earned a B.A. in political science from Ohio State University, and an MBA from Wheeling Jesuit University.

== Career ==
When Wilson's father, Charlie Wilson was elected to Congress in 2006, Senate Democrats appointed him to the unfinished term. Up for reelection in 2008, Wilson won his first full term with 60.86% of the vote over Republican Tim Ginter. For the 128th General Assembly, Wilson served as ranking member of the Agriculture Committee, and a member of the Senate Finance Committee, Highways and Transportation Committee, and the Energy and Public Utilities committee.

For the 129th General Assembly, Wilson was again appointed by colleagues to serve as assistant minority whip, and as a member of the committees on Agriculture, Environment and Natural Resources (as ranking member); Energy and Public Utilities; Financial Institutions; Highways and Transportation (as ranking member); and Rules and Reference. He is also serving on the Ohio Rail Development Commission; the Council on Unreclaimed Strip Mined Lands; and the Southern Ohio Agricultural and Community Development Foundation.

=== Policies and initiatives ===
In a measure that banned abortions late term, Wilson was the sole Democrat to support the legislation. The bill later passed the Senate.

An opponent of limiting collective bargaining, Wilson has introduced legislation that would also lower the pay for legislators, stating that everyone needs to share in sacrificing for the state.

One of three Democrats to do so, Wilson crossed party lines to vote for a bill that would allow individuals with concealed carry licenses to have them while in a bar or restaurant, as long as there was not alcohol being consumed. Wilson said the bill just brings Ohio's law into compliance with a federal ruling. It also heads to the House for consideration.
