= Miners Protection Act =

The Miners Protection Act is a bill to establish pension and health care benefits to mine workers and has been introduced to Congress 4 times since 2015 but has still not been voted on by the full Senate. The Miners Protection Act would be an amendment to the Surface Mining Control and Reclamation Act. The act would redirect extraneous funds from the Surface Mining Control and Reclamation Act to be funneled into miners pensions and health care.

== Background ==
Miners are currently disbursing pension and health care capital at a rate exceeding its income. The issue stems from a massive decline in the coal industry, causing the number of retired coal miners to exceed the amount of active miners. The decline of the coal industry and miners that contribute to the UMWA Health and Retirement Funds, results in their inability to provide coverage for retired coal miners. The Miners Protection Act would provide an increase in funds to the organizations that support retired coal miners, such as the United Mine Workers of America Pension Plan and Multiemployer Health Benefit Plan. Miners and their families that would qualify to receive benefits pursuant to the Miners Protection Act of 2017 are commissioned into either the Multiemployer Health Benefit Plan or the United Mine Workers of America Pension Plan during the period when the bill would be enacted. Funds are available to include disabled, retired, or deceased miners and their families. Moreover, miners who worked for coal companies that have declared bankruptcy, or maintain frozen accounts resulting from lawsuits, would also be eligible to receive funds. Although these miners would no longer receive healthcare benefits after April, 2017, the government extended this deadline. The Miners Protection Act is designed to ensure all coal miners have an equal opportunity to receive benefits guaranteed in their contracts, through government funding.

== History ==
=== 2015 ===
The Miners Protection Act was originally introduced in the U.S. Senate on July 7, 2015, by the Senator of West Virginia, Joe Manchin III. The Miners Protection Act was discussed in the 114th Congress between the House of Representatives and the Senate which passed on the bill to the Committee of Finance to further evaluate the proper use of government funds. The bill had bipartisan support and was cosponsored by 26 senators. Several Democratic senators (Donnelly, J-IN; Kaine, T- VA; Warner, M-VA; Scott, R-VA) and one Republican senator (Griffith, M- VA) made official statements to the public actively supporting the bill. The bill however, was never brought to the floor for a vote in the Senate.

=== 2016 ===
The Miners Protection Act was introduced again on November 16, 2016. The bill was then passed to the United States Committee of Finance for review, and it was recommended to pass. The bill was sponsored by Senator Orrin Hatch of Utah. The Miners Protection Act was not approved by all parts of Congress, and was thereby dismissed. The bill had no cosponsors from other senators. Coal miners have stated that many mine workers are depending on the bill to be passed. Coal miners' response to the second dismissal of the bill in the end of 2016 was to blame Mitch McConnell, the Senate majority leader, for the failure of the bill.

=== 2017 ===
The Miners Protection Act was reintroduced for the third time in the 115th Congress on January 3, 2017. The bill was proposed by Congressman David McKinley, a House of Representatives member from West Virginia. The bill had 78 cosponsors with bipartisan support in the House of Representatives. The majority of the bill's supporters were Democrats. Democratic leader in the House of Representatives, Nancy Pelosi, supported the "Miners Protection Act" and advocated for the bill to her constituents on December 8, 2016. The bill did not pass in the House of Representatives shortly after it was introduced. The Miners Protection Act was then introduced in the Senate by Senator Joe Manchin III of West Virginia on January 17, 2017. The bill had bipartisan support in the Senate with 27 cosponsors. The Miners Protection Act did not pass again in the senate, however, other laws came from this bill.

Mitch McConnell developed a proposal that would provide healthcare to miners indefinitely and became an official law in 2017 with the approval of President Donald Trump. This law was separate from the Miner Protection Act and only addressed certain parts of the issue miners are struggling with. The UMWA claims that Congress passed the part of the Miners Protection Act that only secures the health benefits of miners, but not their pensions. Miners were outraged, and said that the continuous dismissal of the Miners Protection Act was unlawful and unjust. However, Mitch McConnell claimed the passage of the bill as a victory for having a sustaining solution for the coal miner financial support of healthcare supplied by the U.S. government. Miners have mixed reactions to Mitch McConnell's law as they are satisfied with receiving coverage for their healthcare but, are still uneasy about the law avoiding funding towards miners' pensions. Miners are expecting the government to solve the pension crisis of the UMWA's Health and Retirement Funds running out of money for retired coal miner's pensions.

=== 2019 ===
The Miners Protection Act has not been resubmitted to Congress since 2017. However, other bills were created to address issues presented by the Miners Protection Act. Recently, Shelley Capito, Junior Senator of West Virginia, introduced the "Miners Pension Protection Act" on March 26, 2019. The bill would also amend the Surface Mining Control and Reclamation Act to provide funds to coal miners' pensions.
