= Kealiʻi Blaisdell =

- Born: July 16, 1972 (age 53)
- Origin: Honolulu, Hawaii
- Genres: Native Hawaiian music Traditional Hawaiian Songs
- Occupation(s): Musician, Activist

Kealiʻi Blaisdell (born July 16, 1972) is an American musician whose popularity has drawn thousands of fans to his appearances. His 1996 release; "Ka Ulu Maeʻole" sold well at many island music stores and was played heavily on radio stations in Maui and Kauaʻi.

Blaisdell is a multiple Nā Hōkū Hanohano Finalist (Hawaiian Academy of Recording Arts) for Most Promising Artist and Hawaiian Language Performance, Hawaiian slack key guitarist, recording artist, and music composer. He is known as a prolific composer of the Native Hawaiian music genre with over 130 original Traditional Hawaiian Songs and a Native Hawaiian Activist.
