= Ohio's 58th House of Representatives district =

American legislative district

Ohio's 58th State House of Representatives district
Representative
Lauren McNally; D–Youngstown
- Population (2020) • Voting age • Citizens of voting age: 118,730; 94,955; 96,495

Ohio's 58th House of Representatives district is currently represented by Democrat Lauren McNally. It is located entirely within Mahoning County and includes the municipalities of Youngstown, Poland, Craig Beach, Lowellville, and Lake Milton, as well as Austintown, Jackson, Poland, Coitsville, and Milton Townships.

== List of members representing the district ==
Member	Party	Years	General Assembly	Electoral history
District established January 2, 1967.
Robert E. Holmes (Columbus)	Republican	January 2, 1967 – December 31, 1968	107th	Elected in 1966. Retired.
Larry Hughes (Columbus)	Republican	January 6, 1969 – December 31, 1972	108th 109th	Elected in 1968. Re-elected in 1970. Redistricted to the 66th district.
Tom Kindness (Hamilton)	Republican	January 1, 1973 – December 31, 1974	110th	Redistricted from the 40th district and re-elected in 1972. Retired to run for U.S. Representative.
Michael A. Fox (Hamilton)	Republican	January 6, 1975 – December 31, 1982	111th 112th 113th 114th	Elected in 1974. Re-elected in 1976. Re-elected in 1978. Re-elected in 1980. Redistricted to the 56th district.
Joseph Williams (Niles)	Democratic	January 3, 1983 – December 31, 1986	115th 116th	Redistricted from the 56th district and re-elected in 1982. Re-elected in 1984. Retired.
June Lucas (Mineral Ridge)	Democratic	January 5, 1987 – December 31, 1992	117th 118th 119th	Elected in 1986. Re-elected in 1988. Re-elected in 1990. Redistricted to the 67th district.
Scott Nein (Middletown)	Republican	January 4, 1993 – July 11, 1995	120th 121st	Redistricted from the 57th district and re-elected in 1992. Re-elected in 1994. Resigned to become state senator.
Vacant		July 11, 1995 – October 5, 1995	121st	
Gary Cates (West Chester Township)	Republican	October 5, 1995 – December 31, 2002	121st 122nd 123rd 124th	Appointed to finish Nein's term. Re-elected in 1996. Re-elected in 1998. Re-elected in 2000. Redistricted to the 55th district.
Kathleen Walcher (Norwalk)	Republican	January 6, 2003 – May 25, 2006	125th 126th	Elected in 2002. Re-elected in 2004. Resigned.
Dan White (Norwalk)	Republican	May 25, 2006 – December 31, 2006	126th	Appointed to finish Walcher's term. Lost re-election.
Matt Barrett (Amherst)	Democratic	January 1, 2007 – April 24, 2008	127th	Elected in 2006. Resigned.
Vacant		April 24, 2008 – May 21, 2008	127th	
Tom Heydinger (Norwalk)	Democratic	May 21, 2008 – December 31, 2008	127th	Appointed to finish Barrett's term. Retired.
Terry Boose (Norwalk)	Republican	January 5, 2009 – December 31, 2012	128th 129th	Elected in 2008. Re-elected in 2010. Redistricted to the 57th district.
Bob Hagan (Youngstown)	Democratic	January 7, 2013 – December 31, 2014	130th	Redistricted from the 60th district and re-elected in 2012. Term-limited.
Michele Lepore-Hagan (Youngstown)	Democratic	January 5, 2015 – December 31, 2022	131st 132nd 133rd 134th	Elected in 2014. Re-elected in 2016. Re-elected in 2018. Re-elected in 2020. Term-limited.
Alessandro Cutrona (Canfield)	Republican	January 2, 2023 – June 26, 2024	135th	Redistricted from the 59th district and re-elected in 2022.
Tex Fischer	Republican	June 27, 2024 – December 31, 2024	135th	Appointed to finish Cutrona's term.
Lauren McNally (Youngstown)	Democratic	January 3, 2025 – present	136th	Redistricted from the 59th district and re-elected in 2024

== Elections ==
=== 2020 ===
2020 General election
Party	Candidate	Votes	%
Democratic	Michele Lepore Hagan (Incumbent)	32,218	67.44%
Republican	David T. Simon	15,556	32.56%
Total votes		47,774	100%
Democratic hold			

=== 2018 ===
2018 General election
Party	Candidate	Votes	%
Democratic	Michele Lepore-Hagan (Incumbent)	25,978	70.32%
Republican	David T. Simon	10,967	29.68%
Total votes		36,945	100%
Democratic hold			

=== 2016 ===
2016 General election
Party	Candidate	Votes	%
Democratic	Michele Lepore-Hagan (Incumbent)	28,828	59.61%
Republican	Corrine Sanderson	11,001	22.75%
Independent	Andrea Mahone	8,531	17.64%
Total votes		48,360	100%
Democratic hold			

=== 2014 ===
2014 General election
Party	Candidate	Votes	%
Democratic	Michele Lepore-Hagan	20,228	100%
Total votes		20,228	100%

=== 2012 ===
2012 General election
Party	Candidate	Votes	%
Democratic	Bob Hagan	43,309	100%
Total votes		43,309	100%
Democratic gain from Republican			

=== 2010 ===
2010 General election
Party	Candidate	Votes	%
Republican	Terry Boose (Incumbent)	22,861	62.29%
Democratic	Gregory Davidson	11,800	32.15%
Libertarian	Bob Williams	2,042	5.56%
Total votes		36,703	100%
Republican hold			
