= 126th Ohio General Assembly =

The One Hundred Twenty-sixth Ohio General Assembly was the legislative body of the state of Ohio in 2005 and 2006. In this General Assembly, both the Ohio Senate and the Ohio House of Representatives were controlled by the Republican Party. In the Senate, there were 22 Republicans and 11 Democrats. In the House, there were 60 Republicans and 39 Democrats.

== Major events ==
=== Vacancies ===
- December 1, 2005: Senator Mark Mallory (D-9th) resigns to become Mayor of Cincinnati, Ohio.
- August 25, 2005: Representative Merle G. Kearns (R-72nd) resigns to take a position in the cabinet of Governor Bob Taft.
- February 28, 2006: Senator Dan Brady (D-23rd) resigns.
- February 28, 2006: Representative Dale Miller (D-14th) resigns to take a seat in the Ohio Senate.
- May 25, 2006: Representative Kathleen Walcher Reed (R-58th) resigns.
- July 27, 2006: Representative Dixie Allen (D-39th) resigns to become Montgomery County, Ohio Commissioner
- December 31, 2006: Senator Jim Jordan (R-12th) resigns to take a seat in the United States House of Representatives.
- December 31, 2006: Senator Charlie Wilson (D-30th) resigns to take a seat in the United States House of Representatives.
- December 31, 2006: Senator Marc Dann (D-32nd) resigns to become Ohio Attorney General.

=== Appointments ===
- October 5, 2005: Ross McGregor appointed as Representative of the 72nd District, succeeding Merle G. Kearns.
- December 6, 2005: Eric Kearney appointed as Senator of the 9th District, succeeding Mark Mallory.
- March 1, 2006: Dale Miller appointed as Senator of the 23rd District, succeeding Dan Brady.
- May 25, 2006: Mike Foley appointed as Representative to the 14th District, succeeding Dale Miller.
- May 25, 2006: Dan White appointed as Representative to the 58th District, succeeding Kathleen Walcher Reed.
- November 14, 2006: Clayton Luckie appointed as Representative of the 39th District, succeeding Dixie Allen.

=== Leadership changes ===
- August 25, 2005: Resignation of Merle G. Kearns as Majority Floor Leader corresponding with resignation.
- January 15, 2006: Resignation of Chris Redfern as Minority Leader; Joyce Beatty subsequently made Minority Leader, and Todd Book Assistant Minority Leader.
- March 31, 2006: Lance Mason resigns as Assistant Minority Whip; Fred Strahorn is selected to replace him.

== Senate ==
Affiliation	Party (Shading indicates majority caucus)		Total	
Affiliation	Republican	Democratic	Total	Vacant
End of previous legislature	22	11	33	0
Begin	22	11	33	0
Latest voting share	66.6%	34.4%		

=== Leadership ===
==== Majority leadership ====
- President of the Senate: Bill Harris
- President pro tempore of the Senate: Jeff Jacobson
- Floor Leader: Randy Gardner
- Assistant Majority Floor Leader: Robert Spada
- Whip: Steve Austria
- Assistant Majority Whip: Jay Hottinger

==== Minority leadership ====
- Leader: C.J. Prentiss
- Assistant Leader: Mark Mallory
- Whip: Teresa Fedor
- Assistant Whip: Bob Hagan

=== Members of the 126th Ohio Senate ===
District	Senator	Party	First elected
1	Lynn Wachtmann	Republican	1998
2	Randy Gardner	Republican	2000
3	David Goodman	Republican	2001 (Appt.)
4	Gary Cates	Republican	2004
5	Tom Roberts	Democratic	2002 (Appt.)
6	Jeff Jacobson	Republican	2000
7	Robert Schuler	Republican	2002
8	Patricia Clancy	Republican	2004
9	Eric Kearney	Democratic	2005 (Appt.)
10	Steve Austria	Republican	2000
11	Teresa Fedor	Democratic	2002
12	Jim Jordan	Republican	2000
13	Jeff Armbruster	Republican	1998
14	Tom Niehaus	Republican	2004
15	Ray Miller	Democratic	2002
16	Steve Stivers	Republican	2003 (Appt.)
17	John Carey	Republican	2002
18	Timothy Grendell	Republican	2004
19	Bill Harris	Republican	2000 (Appt.)
20	Joy Padgett	Republican	2004 (Appt.)
21	C.J. Prentiss	Democratic	1998
22	Ron Amstutz	Republican	2000
23	Dale Miller	Democratic	2006 (Appt.)
24	Robert Spada	Republican	1999 (Appt.)
25	Eric Fingerhut	Democratic	1998
26	Larry Mumper	Republican	1997 (Appt.)
27	Kevin Coughlin	Republican	2001 (Appt.)
28	Kimberly Zurz	Democratic	2003 (Appt.)
29	Kirk Schuring	Republican	2002
30	Charlie Wilson	Democratic	2004
31	Jay Hottinger	Republican	1998 (Appt.)
32	Marc Dann	Democratic	2003 (Appt.)
33	Bob Hagan	Democratic	1997 (Appt.)

== House of Representatives ==
=== Composition ===
Affiliation	Party (Shading indicates majority caucus)		Total	
Affiliation	Democratic	Republican	Total	Vacant
End of previous legislature	39	60	99	0
Begin	39	60	99	0
Latest voting share	39.9%	60.1%		

=== Leadership ===
==== Majority leadership ====
- Speaker of the House: Jon Husted
- Speaker Pro Tempore of the House: Chuck Blasdel
- Floor Leader: Merle G. Kearns (January 6, 2005 – August 25, 2005)
- Assistant Majority Floor Leader: Larry L. Flowers
- Majority Whip: Kevin DeWine
- Assistant Majority Whip: Jim Carmichael

==== Minority leadership ====
- Leader: Chris Redfern (January 6, 2005 – January 15, 2006), Joyce Beatty (January 15, 2006, December 31, 2006)
- Assistant Leader: Joyce Beatty (January 6, 2005 – January 15, 2006), Todd Book (January 15, 2006-)
- Whip: Steve Driehaus
- Assistant Whip: Lance Mason

=== Members of the 126th Ohio House of Representatives ===
District	Representative	Party	First elected
1	Chuck Blasdel	Republican	2000
2	Jon Peterson	Republican	2000
3	Jim Carmichael	Republican	2000
4	John R. Willamowski	Republican	1997 (Appt.)
5	Tim Schaffer	Republican	2000
6	Bob Latta	Republican	2000
7	Kenny Yuko	Democratic	2004
8	Lance Mason	Democratic	2002 (Appt.)
9	Claudette Woodard	Democratic	2000
10	Shirley Smith	Democratic	1998
11	Annie L. Key	Democratic	2000
12	Michael DeBose	Democratic	2002 (Appt.)
13	Michael J. Skindell	Democratic	2002
14	Michael Foley	Democratic	2006 (Appt.)
15	Timothy J. DeGeeter	Democratic	2003 (Appt.)
16	Sally Conway Kilbane	Republican	1998
17	Jim Trakas	Republican	1998
18	Tom Patton	Republican	2002
19	Larry L. Flowers	Republican	2000
20	Jim McGregor	Republican	2001 (Appt.)
21	Linda Reidelbach	Republican	2000
22	Jim Hughes	Republican	2000
23	Larry Wolpert	Republican	2000
24	Geoffrey C. Smith	Republican	1998
25	Dan Stewart	Democratic	2002
26	Mike Mitchell	Democratic	2004
27	Joyce Beatty	Democratic	1999 (Appt.)
28	Jim Raussen	Republican	2002
29	Lou Blessing	Republican	2004
30	Bill Seitz	Republican	2000
31	Steve Driehaus	Democratic	2000
32	Catherine L. Barrett	Democratic	1998
33	Tyrone Yates	Democratic	2002
34	Tom Brinkman Jr.	Republican	2000
35	Michelle G. Schneider	Republican	2000
36	Arlene Setzer	Republican	2000
37	Jon Husted	Republican	2000
38	John White	Republican	2000
39	Clayton Luckie	Democratic	2006 (Appt.)
40	Fred Strahorn	Democratic	2000
41	Brian Williams	Democratic	2004
42	John Widowfield	Republican	2001 (Appt.)
43	Mary Taylor	Republican	2002
44	Barbara Sykes	Democratic	2000
45	Robert J. Otterman	Democratic	2000
46	Mark Wagoner	Republican	2004
47	Peter Ujvagi	Democratic	2002
48	Edna Brown	Democratic	2001 (Appt.)
49	Jeanine Perry	Democratic	1998
50	John Hagan	Republican	2000
51	Scott Oelslager	Republican	2002
52	William J. Healy II	Democratic	2004
53	Shawn Webster	Republican	2000
54	Courtney Combs	Republican	2004 (Appt.)
55	Bill Coley	Republican	2004
56	Joseph Koziura	Democratic	2001 (Appt.)
57	Earl Martin	Republican	2003 (Appt.)
58	Dan White	Republican	2006 (Appt.)
59	Kenneth Carano	Democratic	2000
60	Sylvester Patton	Democratic	1997 (Appt.)
61	John Boccieri	Democratic	2000
62	Lorraine Fende	Democratic	2004
63	Timothy J. Cassell	Democratic	2004
64	Randy Law	Republican	2004
65	Sandra Harwood	Democratic	2002
66	Joe Uecker	Republican	2004
67	Tom Raga	Republican	2000
68	Kathleen Chandler	Democratic	2002
69	Chuck Calvert	Republican	1998
70	Kevin DeWine	Republican	2000
71	David R. Evans	Republican	1998 (Appt.)
72	Ross McGregor	Republican	2005 (Appt.)
73	William J. Hartnett	Democratic	1998 (Appt.)
74	Steve Buehrer	Republican	1998
75	Jim Hoops	Republican	1998
76	Mike Gilb	Republican	2000
77	Keith Faber	Republican	2000
78	Derrick Seaver	Republican	2000
79	Diana Fessler	Republican	2000
80	Chris Redfern	Democratic	1999 (Appt.)
81	Jeff Wagner	Republican	2002
82	Steve Reinhard	Republican	2000
83	Tony Core	Republican	2000
84	Chris Widener	Republican	2002
85	John M. Schlichter	Republican	2002
86	David T. Daniels	Republican	2002
87	Clyde Evans	Republican	2002
88	Danny Bubp	Republican	2004
89	Todd Book	Democratic	2002
90	Thom Collier	Republican	2000 (Appt.)
91	Ron Hood	Republican	2004
92	Jimmy Stewart	Republican	2002
93	Jennifer Garrison	Democratic	2004
94	Jim Aslanides	Republican	2000
95	John Domenick	Democratic	2002
96	Allan Sayre	Democratic	2004
97	Bob Gibbs	Republican	2002
98	Matt Dolan	Republican	2004
99	George Distel	Democratic	1999 (Appt.)

Appt.- Member was appointed to current House Seat

== See also ==
- Ohio House of Representatives membership, 126th General Assembly
- Ohio House of Representatives membership, 125th General Assembly
