= Ohio's 10th senatorial district =

American legislative district

Ohio's 10th State Senate district
Senator
Kyle Koehler; R–Springfield
- Demographics: 82% White; 9.3% Black; 3.3% Hispanic; 2.8% Asian; 2.3% Native American; 0.2% Hawaiian/Pacific Islander
- Population (2020) • Voting age • Citizens of voting age: 345,985; 270,968; 265,225

The current district was modified after redistricting in 2023 Ohio's 10th senatorial district comprises Clark, Green and Clinton County. It encompasses the 70, 71, 74 House Districts.

The district's current Ohio Senator is Republican Kyle Koehler.

== Historically ==
Before the 2023 redistricting, Ohio's 10th district has been based in south-central Ohio, comprising the counties of Clark, Greene and Madison counties and encompassing Ohio House districts 73, 74 and 79. It has had a Cook PVI of R+15.

== List of senators ==
Senator	Party	Term	Notes
Max Dennis	Republican	January 8, 1963 – December 31, 1976	Dennis did not seek re-election in 1976.
John Mahoney	Democrat	January 3, 1977 – December 31, 1980	Mahoney lost re-election in 1980 to Mike DeWine.
Mike DeWine	Republican	January 3, 1981 – December 13, 1982	DeWine won election to the United States Congress in 1982.
Dave Hobson	Republican	December 13, 1982 – January 3, 1991	Hobson won election to the United States Congress in 1990.
Merle G. Kearns	Republican	January 3, 1991 – December 31, 2000	Kearns was term-limited in 2000.
Steve Austria	Republican	January 3, 2001 – December 31, 2008	Austria was term-limited in 2008.
Chris Widener	Republican	January 6, 2009 – January 21, 2016	Widener resigned to work in the private sector.
Bob Hackett	Republican	February 23, 2016 – December 31, 2024	Hackett was term-limited in 2024
Kyle Koehler	Republican	January 1, 2025 – present	Incumbent
