= DeWine =

DeWine is the surname of three United States politicians from Ohio:

- Kevin DeWine, former member of the Ohio House of Representatives
- Mike DeWine, current governor of Ohio
- Pat DeWine, associate justice of the Ohio Supreme Court

== See also ==
- The dictionary definition of dewine at Wiktionary
