= Ohio's 80th House of Representatives district =

American legislative district

Ohio's 80th State House of Representatives district
Representative
Johnathan Newman; R
- Population (2020): 124,211

Ohio's 80th House of Representatives district is currently represented by Republican Johnathan Newman. It is located in the western part of the state and includes all of Miami County and a portion of southern Darke County.

== List of members representing the district ==
Member	Party	Years	General Assembly	Electoral history
District established January 2, 1967.
Barney Quilter (Toledo)	Democratic	January 2, 1967 – December 31, 1972	107th 108th 109th	Elected in 1966. Re-elected in 1968. Re-elected in 1970. Redistricted to the 47th district.
Dale Locker (Anna)	Democratic	January 1, 1973 – December 31, 1982	110th 111th 112th 113th 114th	Elected in 1972. Re-elected in 1974. Re-elected in 1976. Re-elected in 1978. Re-elected in 1980. Redistricted to the 81st district.
Charlie Earl (Fostoria)	Republican	January 3, 1983 – December 31, 1984	115th	Redistricted from the 82nd district and re-elected in 1982. Retired.
Lynn Wachtmann (Napoleon)	Republican	January 7, 1985 – December 31, 1992	116th 117th 118th 119th	Elected in 1984. Re-elected in 1986. Re-elected in 1988. Re-elected in 1990. Redistricted to the 83rd district.
Joan Lawrence (Galena)	Republican	January 4, 1993 – December 31, 2000	120th 121st 122nd 123rd	Redistricted from the 87th district and re-elected in 1992. Re-elected in 1994. Re-elected in 1996. Re-elected in 1998. Term-limited.
Jon Peterson (Delaware)	Republican	January 1, 2001 – December 31, 2002	124th	Elected in 2000. Redistricted to the 2nd district.
Chris Redfern (Port Clinton)	Democratic	January 6, 2003 – December 31, 2008	125th 126th 127th	Redistricted from the 53rd district and re-elected in 2002. Re-elected in 2004. Re-elected in 2006. Term-limited.
Dennis Murray (Sandusky)	Democratic	January 5, 2009 – December 20, 2012	128th 129th	Elected in 2008. Re-elected in 2010. Redistricted to the 89th district and retired.
Richard Adams (Troy)	Republican	January 7, 2013 – December 30, 2014	130th	Redistricted from the 79th district and re-elected in 2012. Retired.
Steve Huffman (Tipp City)	Republican	January 5, 2015 – December 31, 2018	131st 132nd	Elected in 2014. Re-elected in 2016. Retired to run for state senator.
Jena Powell (Arcanum)	Republican	January 7, 2019 – December 31, 2024	133rd 134th 135th	Elected in 2018. Re-elected in 2020. Re-elected in 2022.
Johnathan Newman (Troy)	Republican	January 6, 2025 – Present	136th	Elected in 2024.

== Election results ==
=== 2020 ===
2020 General election
Party	Candidate	Votes	%
Republican	Jena Powell (Incumbent)	50,578	76.04%
Democratic	Ted Jones	15,933	23.96%
Total votes		66,511	100%
Republican hold			

=== 2018 ===
2018 General election
Party	Candidate	Votes	%
Republican	Jena Powell (Incumbent)	31,908	75.51%
Democratic	D.J. Byrnes	10,347	24.49%
Total votes		42,255	100%
Republican hold			

=== 2016 ===
2016 General election
Party	Candidate	Votes	%
Republican	Stephen A. Huffman (Incumbent)	48,251	100%
Total votes		48,251	100%
Republican hold			

=== 2014 ===
2014 General election
Party	Candidate	Votes	%
Republican	Stephen A. Huffman (Incumbent)	27,585	77.35%
Democratic	Johnathan Michalski	8,077	22.65%
Total votes		35,662	100%
Republican hold			

=== 2012 ===
2012 General election
Party	Candidate	Votes	%
Republican	Richard Adams	40,006	69.30%
Democratic	Dave Fisher	17,719	30.70%
Total votes		57,725	100%
Republican gain from Democratic			

=== 2010 ===
2010 General election
Party	Candidate	Votes	%
Democratic	Dennis Murray (Incumbent)	20,220	49.06%
Republican	Jeff Krabill	19,359	46.97%
Libertarian	Judy Kayden	1,638	3.97%
Total votes		41,217	100%
Democratic hold			
