= Senator Kearns =

Senator Kearns may refer to:

- Merle G. Kearns (1938–2014), Ohio State Senate
- Thomas Kearns (1862–1918), U.S. Senator from Utah from 1901 to 1905
