= Bill Dean (politician) =

Ohio politician

Member of the Ohio House of Representatives from the 74th district
- Incumbent
- Assumed office April 12, 2016
- Preceded by: Bob Hackett
- Succeeded by: Levi Dean (elect)

Personal details
- Party: Republican
- Children: Levi Dean

Bill Dean is an American politician serving as the state representative for the 74th District of the Ohio House of Representatives. He is a Republican. The district includes Madison County as well as portions of Clark County and Greene County.

== Life and career ==
Dean is a lifelong resident of Xenia, Ohio and has been a licensed plumber for over thirty years. For the past twenty-six years, Dean has owned and operated Dean's Plumbing, based in Xenia and serving southwest Ohio. He has been married for over forty years and is the father of ten.

His son-in-law, Ron Hood, is credited for encouraging Dean to run for office.

== Ohio House of Representatives ==
In 2016, Dean filed to run for the 74th District of the Ohio House of Representatives to replace Bob Hackett, who was term limited. Dean was one of four to file for the Republican primary in a district that leaned overwhelmingly Republican. Against his three opponents, Dean went on to win the nomination with nearly 38% of the vote.

When Senator Chris Widener resigned from his seat in the Ohio Senate prior the expiration of his term, Bob Hackett was appointed to replace him, vacating his seat in Ohio House. Soon after, Speaker of the House Cliff Rosenberger stated that whoever won the Republican primary would be seated to succeed Hackett. As a result, Dean was seated on April 12, 2016, following his primary victory.

In 2019, Dean co-sponsored legislation that would ban abortion in Ohio and criminalize what they called "abortion murder". Doctors who performed abortions in cases of ectopic pregnancy and other life-threatening conditions would be exempt from prosecution only if they "[took] all possible steps to preserve the life of the unborn child, while preserving the life of the woman. Such steps include, if applicable, attempting to reimplant an ectopic pregnancy into the woman's uterus". Reimplantation of an ectopic pregnancy is not a recognized or medically feasible procedure.

In November 2023, after Ohio voters approved a measure that would enshrine reproductive rights in the state's constitution, Dean was one of several Republicans who claimed that "[t]o prevent mischief by pro-abortion courts with Issue 1, Ohio legislators will consider removing jurisdiction from the judiciary over this ambiguous ballot initiative. The Ohio legislature alone will consider what, if any, modifications to make to existing laws". Dean added that "Issue 1 doesn't repeal a single Ohio law, in fact, it doesn't even mention one. The amendment's language is dangerously vague and unconstrained, and can be weaponized to attack parental rights or defend rapists, pedophiles, and human traffickers."

Political offices
Preceded by Bob Hackett	Ohio House of Representatives, 74th District; 2016–present	Incumbent
