= Max Dennis =

American politician

Member of the Ohio Senate from the 10th district
- In office January 3, 1965 – December 31, 1976
- Preceded by: District Created
- Succeeded by: John Mahoney

Personal details
- Born: August 9, 1925
- Died: April 24, 1986 (aged 60)
- Party: Republican

Max Dennis (August 9, 1925 – April 24, 1986) was a Republican politician who served in the Ohio Senate. An attorney from Wilmington, Ohio, Dennis was initially elected to the Ohio House of Representatives in 1954 and served five terms. He moved over to the senate in 1964, following an appointment. Following the Voting Rights Act of 1965, Dennis was reelected to a new district in 1966, and initially served as the chairman of the Senate Judiciary Committee. He again was reelected in 1968.

After winning reelection to another four-year term in 1972, Dennis was named finance chairman of the senate, one of the most powerful chairmanships. He served in this capacity until Democrats won control of the senate in 1974.

In 1976, Dennis did not seek reelection, and was replaced by Democrat John Mahoney. Following his tenure in the legislature, he returned to Wilmington and retired. He died on April 24, 1986.
