= Jena Powell =

American politician (born 1993)

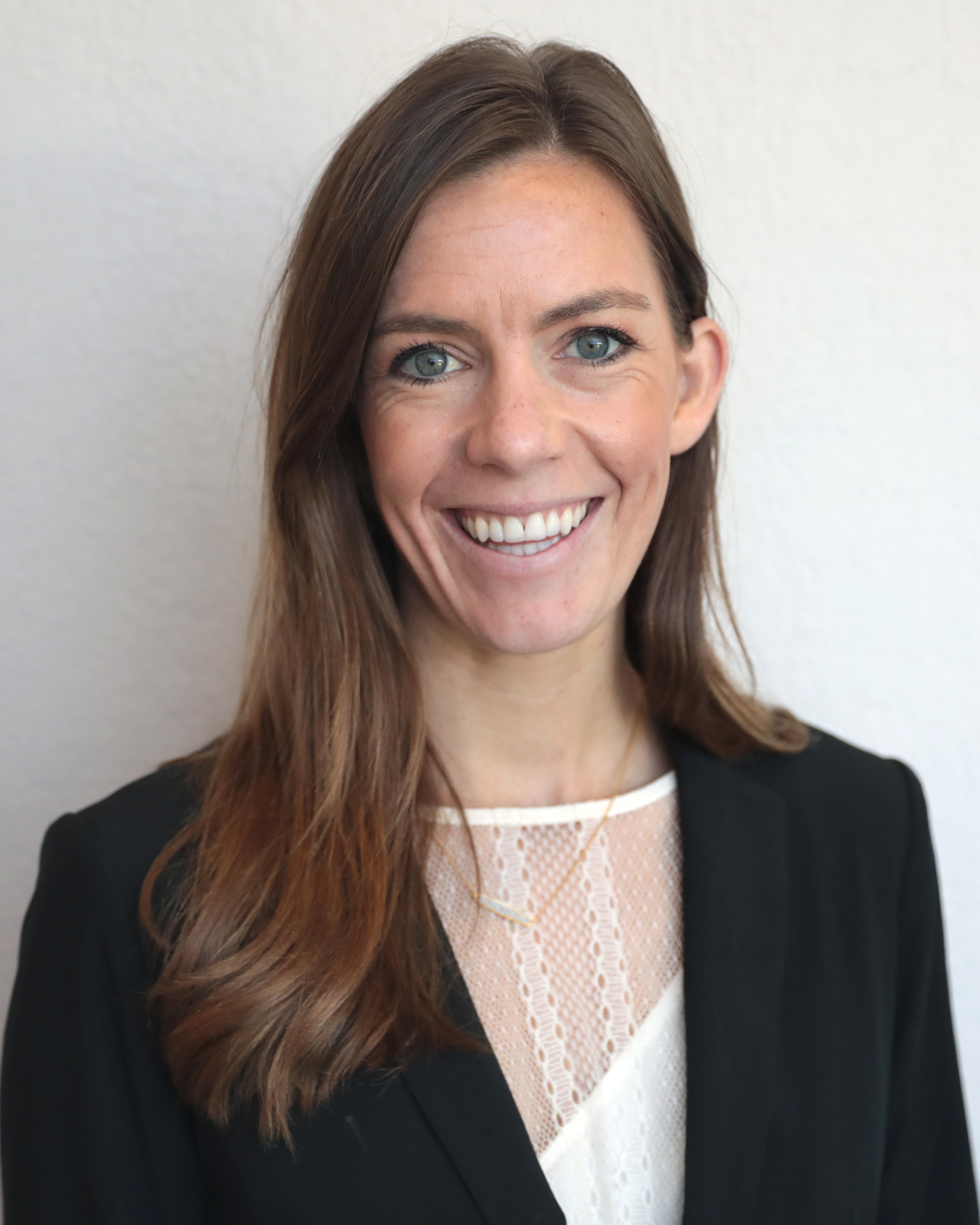

Member of the Ohio House of Representatives from the 80th district
- In office January 7, 2019 – January 1, 2025
- Preceded by: Steve Huffman
- Succeeded by: Johnathan Newman

Personal details
- Born: December 25, 1993 (age 32) Arcanum, Ohio
- Party: Republican
- Education: Liberty University

Jena Powell (born December 25, 1993) is an American business woman and former politician who served in the Ohio House of Representatives from the 80th district from 2019 to 2025.

== Biography ==
Jena Powell is from a farming family in southern Darke County. She received a bachelor's degree from Liberty University in Business and worked at the billboard company founded by her brother.

== Ohio House of Representatives ==
Powell said she was motivated to run for state office because of frustration with zoning regulations related to billboard placement. Powell secured 75% of the vote in the 2018 General election, making her the youngest state representative in Ohio. She subsequently was featured in the 2019 Forbes 30 under 30 list in the category of law and policy.

=== COVID-19 pandemic response ===
Powell opposed Governor Mike DeWine's face mask mandate, writing, "No. It's our freedom and it's being ripped from us through executive force." Powell responded positively to the Union City Police Department announcing that they would not be enforcing the governor's orders, writing, "Great news!" on their Facebook post.

=== LGBT rights ===
In February 2020, Powell proposed Bill 61, Save Women's Sports Act, which prohibits transgender women and girls from competing in women's sports. Her attempt to add an amendment to the Name, Image, and Likeness bill failed. In June, DeWine signed an executive action allowing college athletes in Ohio to earn money off their name, image and likeness, bypassing Senate Bill 187, as well as Powell's amendment. DeWine went on record opposing the amendment, saying: "The welfare of those young people needs to be absolutely most important to this issue, whether that young person is transgender or not."

=== Abortion ===
In 2019, Powell co-sponsored HB 413, legislation that would ban abortion in Ohio and criminalize what they called "abortion murder". Doctors who performed abortions in cases of ectopic pregnancy and other life-threatening conditions would be exempt from prosecution only if they "[took] all possible steps to preserve the life of the unborn child, while preserving the life of the woman. Such steps include, if applicable, attempting to reimplant an ectopic pregnancy into the woman's uterus". Reimplantation of an ectopic pregnancy is not a recognized or medically feasible procedure.

=== Connection to Larry Householder scandal ===
Powell was a member of the so-called “Team Householder” candidates supported by Larry Householder in the 2018 primary elections. Powell’s campaign received $20,416 from Householder’s campaign, $16,430 from indicted Householder associate’s law firm JPL & Associates, $12,700 from First Energy Corp PAC and $12,500 from Murray Energy PAC. A Householder aligned PAC called Growth and Opportunity spent $27,135 on mailers benefiting Powell. Powell voted for Householder for speaker of the house. In July 2020, Householder was arrested by the FBI on federal bribery and racketeering charges in connection with Ohio House Bill 6.

In June 2021, Powell was one of 21 lawmakers that voted in opposition of Larry Householder’s expulsion from the Ohio House of Representatives.
