= Levi Dean =

American politician

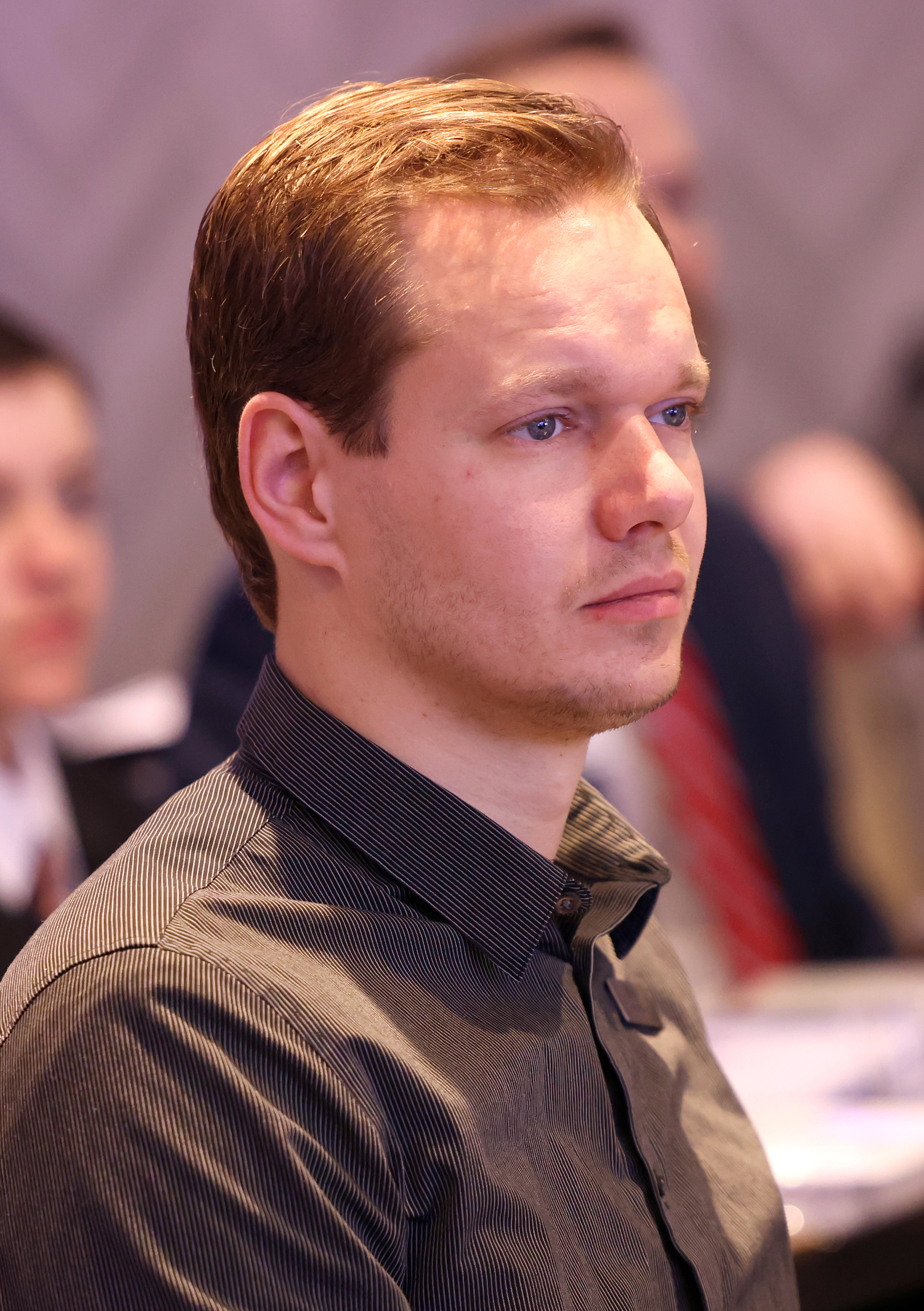
- Dean at the 2024 Hazlitt Summit hosted by Young Americans for Liberty Foundation

Member of the Ohio House of Representatives from the 71st district
- Incumbent
- Assumed office January 1, 2025
- Preceded by: Bill Dean

Member of the Xenia City Council
- In office 2018–2025

Personal details
- Party: Republican
- Parent: Bill Dean (father)

Levi Dean is an American politician. He serves as a Republican member for the 71st district of the Ohio House of Representatives.

== Life and career ==
Dean served in the Xenia City Council from 2018 to 2025.

In March 2024, Dean defeated Joshua Day, Robert Fudge and Tyler Scott in the Republican primary election for the 71st district of the Ohio House of Representatives. In November 2024, he defeated Krista Magaw in the general election, winning 70 percent of the votes. He succeeded Bill Dean. He assumed office on January 1, 2025.

=== Abortion Legislation ===
In June 2025, Dean co-sponsored the Ohio Prenatal Equal Protection Act, a proposed bill that would grant full legal personhood to fertilized embryos and criminalize abortion as homicide. Critics argued that defining all fertilized embryos as legal persons, despite the high rate of natural embryonic loss, introduces legal and biological inconsistencies. They also argued that natural processes such as miscarriage—which account for most embryo loss—are unaddressed by the legislation, raising concerns about the bill's implications.

=== Committee assignments ===
As of June 2026, Dean serves on the following committees in the Ohio House.

- Small Business (vice chair)
- Development
- Education
- Financial Institutions
