= Rick Perales =

American politician

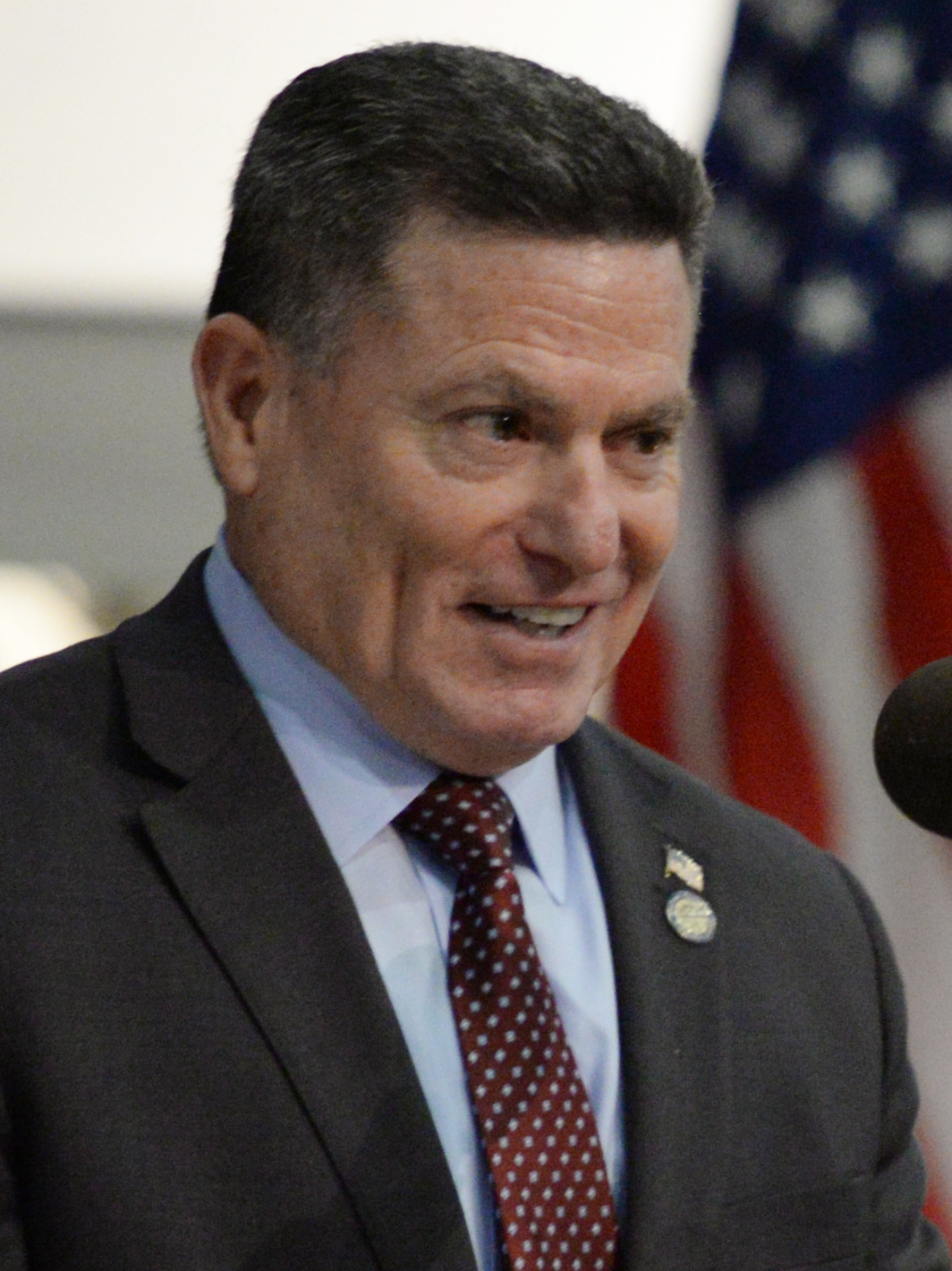

Member of the Ohio House of Representatives from the 73rd district
- In office January 7, 2013 – December 31, 2020
- Preceded by: Jarrod Martin
- Succeeded by: Brian Lampton

Personal details
- Born: September 22, 1959 (age 67) Selma, Alabama, U.S.
- Party: Republican
- Spouse: Becka
- Education: Auburn University (BS); Troy University (MS)
- Profession: Civil Engineer

Military service
- Allegiance: United States
- Branch/service: United States Air Force
- Years of service: 1982–1997
- Rank: Major

Rick Perales (born September 22, 1959) is a former Republican member of the Ohio House of Representatives, representing the 73rd district. He was elected in 2012, defeating Democrat Bill Conner. Prior to this he defeated incumbent Representative Jarrod Martin in the Republican primary in an upset result.

Before joining the Ohio House of Representatives, Perales served on the city council of Beavercreek, Ohio, and as commissioner of Greene County. Prior to that he served in the US Air Force. Perales also works as Campus Planning and Real Estate Director at the University of Dayton.

== Ohio House of Representatives ==
=== 2012 campaign and election ===
Perales joined a crowded primary to unseat incumbent Jarrod Martin. He finished with a commanding lead of 59.85% of the vote, followed by Eric Spicer at 20.86% and Martin finishing third at 19.29%. Perales faced Bill Connor in the General, winning by a wide margin of 64% to 36%.

Perales focused his campaign on his experience in local government. After retiring from the Air Force, he ran for Beavercreek City Council and was elected Mayor from 2002 to 2003. Perales then successfully ran for Greene County Commissioner, a title he held for eight years. When asked about his race for the Ohio Statehouse, Perales cited his experience as a local government official being beneficial to help state leaders appreciate what local governments go through in terms of funding and support.

Perales was sworn in by Speaker William G. Batchelder on January 7, 2013.

=== 2018 campaign and election ===
Perales won the 2018 Republican primary with 80 percent of the vote. Perales filed an extortion complaint with Fairborn Police against his opponent Jocelyn Smith, who alleged that Perales engaged in unwanted sexual behavior towards her many years prior. Perales, who is married, acknowledged that he had exchanged sexual text messages with Smith for three months in 2015, but denied that he kissed or choked Smith, as she alleged. Perales went on to win the general election with 59.6% of the votes.
