= Jarrod Martin =

American politician

Member of the Ohio House of Representatives from the 73rd district
- In office January 5, 2009 – December 31, 2012
- Preceded by: Kevin DeWine
- Succeeded by: Rick Perales

Personal details
- Born: July 4, 1979 (age 47) Xenia, Ohio
- Party: Republican
- Education: College of Mount Saint Joseph, University of Dayton
- Profession: Small Business Consultant

Jarrod Martin is a former Republican member of the Ohio House of Representatives, serving the Seventy-Third District.

== Life and career ==
Martin was born in Xenia, Ohio, but was raised in nearby Beavercreek. A standout athlete at Beavercreek High School, he was awarded one of the largest scholarships in the school's history to attend Virginia Tech. He graduated from College of Mount Saint Joseph with a bachelor's before earning a Masters of Business Administration degree from the University of Dayton. He resides in Beavercreek with his wife, Bernadette, and three children.

== Ohio House of Representatives ==
When Kevin DeWine reached a term limit that disqualified him from re-election, Martin and four other Republicans sought the nomination to replace him. Martin won the primary election with 29.42% of the vote. He easily defeated Democrat Bill Conner in the general election with 59.55% of the electorate. In his first term, Martin was the Ranking Minority Member of the Committee on Alternative Energy. He also served as a member of the Committees on Economic Development, Education, Elections and Ethics, and Public Utilities.

In his first reelection bid in 2010, Martin faced a primary challenge in Bill Miller, but won with 74.09% of the vote. He went on to take a second term against Democrat Michael Watters with 69.93% of the electorate. He is serving on the committees of Public Utilities and Local Government. Martin was also chairman of the Veteran's Affairs committee until September 2011, when he was removed as chairman by House Speaker William Batchelder. A spokesman for Batchelder cited Martin's charges for drunken driving and child endangering as the motivation for the removal. Both charges against Martin were later dropped.

Martin is also a member of the Ohio Aerospace and Defense Advisory Council; the State Council on Educational Opportunities for Military Children; and the Military Activation Task Force.

Martin is a conservative Republican. He is a member of the Ohio Gun Collectors Association, the Greene County Fish and Game Association, and the National Rifle Association. He is an active advocate for gun rights and has supported multiple bills which would make their purchase, usage, and carriage easier. Martin is also a staunch supporter of States' Rights and supported resolutions declaring this to the federal government.

In one of his first legislative initiatives of his second term, Martin and Andy Thompson have introduced a proposal that would allow small private employers across Ohio to award compensatory time off to their employees who work overtime instead of paying cash so long as the employees choose to participate. "It's a simple bill. It's geared to small business," Rep. Martin said.

In 2012, Martin lost the primary for his bid for a third term to Rick Perales, who went on to win the general election for the seat.
