= Bob Hackett =

American politician (born 1949)

Member of the Ohio Senate from the 10th district
- In office February 23, 2016 – December 31, 2024
- Preceded by: Chris Widener
- Succeeded by: Kyle Koehler

Member of the Ohio House of Representatives from the 74th district
- In office January 5, 2009 – February 23, 2016
- Preceded by: Chris Widener
- Succeeded by: Bill Dean

Personal details
- Born: August 3, 1949 (age 77) Columbus, Ohio, U.S.
- Party: Republican
- Education: Columbia University
- Profession: Finance

Bob Hackett (born August 3, 1949) is a former Republican member of the Ohio Senate, representing the 10th district from 2016 to 2024.

== Career ==
Hackett, a graduate of Columbia University where he played on the Columbia Lions football team, served two terms as a Madison County Commissioner and is the founder and a former managing partner of Central Ohio Financial Mgt. Group, LLC.

With incumbent Chris Widener running for the Ohio Senate, Hackett, along with Craig Saunders, opted for the Republican nomination to replace him. Ultimately, Hackett defeated Saunders with 53.34% of the electorate to move on to the general election. He went on to defeat Democrat Connie Crockett in the general election with 61.39% of the vote, winning his first term in the legislature. Hackett easily won reelection in 2010 against Aaron Kilbarger with 69.7% of the vote. Along with his role in the Ohio Senate, Hackett is involved with the Madison County Hospital; Choctaw Lake Property Owners Association; Madison County Farmland Preservation Task Force; the Entrepreneurship Institute of Ohio; Watchdog of the Treasury and is currently a member of the American Legislative Exchange Council (ALEC).

Currently, Hackett is serving on the committees of Financial Institutions, Housing, and Urban Development, Health and Aging, Insurance (as chairman) and its Subcommittee on Workers' Compensation, and Local Government. He also is a member of the Correctional Institution Inspection Committee; and the Unemployment Compensation Advisory Council.

A former county commissioner, Hackett said lawmakers want to do their best to help the local governments save costs and mitigate the financial hit. "Everyone knows these big cuts are coming," he said.

== Abortion legislation ==
In 2019, Hackett co-sponsored Ohio Senate Bill 23, also known as the "Heartbeat Bill." The legislation bans abortions once a fetal heartbeat is detectable—typically around six weeks into pregnancy—and does not include exceptions for rape or incest. Governor Mike DeWine signed the bill into law on April 11, 2019.

Hackett’s support for the bill was consistent with his broader legislative record supporting abortion restrictions. SB 23 became a focal point of national debate and faced immediate legal challenges upon passage.

In 2022, a Hamilton County judge issued a temporary restraining order halting enforcement of the bill, restoring legal abortion access in Ohio up to 22 weeks of pregnancy while litigation proceeded.

== Ohio Senate ==
In early 2016, Senator Bob Hackett was appointed to the Ohio Senate to succeed Senator Chris Widener, who resigned.

=== Committee assignments ===
During the 134th General Assembly, Hackett was assigned to the following Ohio Senate committees:

- (chair of) Insurance Committee
- Agriculture & Natural Resources Committee
- Financial Institutions & Technology Committee
- Veterans & Public Safety Committee
- Rules & Reference Committee
- General Government Budget Committee
