= Robert T. Bennett =

American lawyer and politician

Bob Bennett
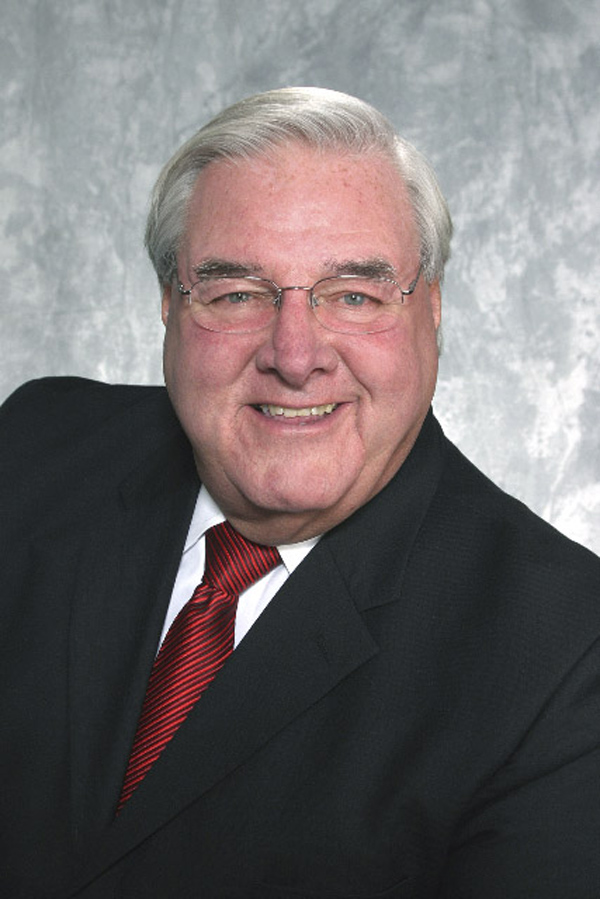

Chair of the Ohio Republican Party
- In office 2012 – May 2013
- Preceded by: Kevin DeWine
- Succeeded by: Matthew Borges
- In office 1988–2009
- Preceded by: Mike Colley
- Succeeded by: Kevin DeWine

Personal details
- Born: Robert T. Bennett; February 8, 1939 Columbus, Ohio, U.S.
- Died: December 6, 2014 (aged 75) Cleveland, Ohio, U.S.
- Party: Republican
- Spouse: Ruth Ann Bennett
- Children: 2
- Education: Ohio State University (BS); Cleveland–Marshall College of Law (JD)

Robert T. "Bob" Bennett (February 8, 1939 – December 6, 2014) was an American attorney, CPA, and political executive who was the chairman of the Ohio Republican Party from 1988 to 2009 and again in 2012 and 2013.

== Early life and education ==
He was born and raised in Columbus, Ohio, where he graduated from St. Thomas Aquinas High School. He received a Bachelor of Science degree in business administration from the Ohio State University in 1960 and a Juris Doctor from Cleveland–Marshall College of Law.

== Career ==
Bennett qualified as a Certified Public Accountant and an attorney specializing in tax and business law. He was a member of the American Bar Association, the Cleveland Bar Association, the Ohio Bar Association, and the American Society of Attorney-Certified Public Accountants, the American Institute of Certified Public Accountants, the Ohio Society of Certified Public Accountants, and the Cleveland chapter of the Ohio CPA's American Institute of Certified Public Accountants. He wrote several publications on tax law and was a guest lecturer to various professional and political organizations on the issues of state and federal tax law and campaign management.

Bennett was a member of the boards of trustees and a director of Ohio business and civic organizations, including University Hospital Case Medical Center Board and Southwest General Health Center of Cleveland, the Cuyahoga County Board of Elections, and the Federal Home Loan Bank of Cincinnati, where he served as chairman of the board.

=== Ohio Republican Party ===
Bennett was elected chairman of the Ohio Republican Party in 1988, and remained until 2009. Following the resignation of then party chairman Kevin DeWine, Bennett resumed his position as chairman in 2012 and remained until May 2013. At the time of his election in 1988 the party held no statewide offices or legislative majorities; within a decade it had control of all three branches of the Ohio government. During his tenure, Republicans held the Ohio governor's office for 16 years, won every statewide office, held majorities in the Ohio General Assembly, won unanimous control of the Ohio Supreme Court, and won more than 63 percent of all county elective offices in the state.

== Personal life ==
Bennett resided in Cleveland, Ohio, with his wife, Ruth Ann. He is survived by two adult children.

Bennett, who had triple bypass surgery in 1996 after a mild heart attack, had been in declining health since 2012, when he was afflicted by a lingering and baffling respiratory problem that doctors finally traced to an infection he contracted during a visit to Moscow. Bennett passed on December 6, 2014, at his home in Cleveland, Ohio.
