= Johnathan Newman =

American politician (born 1968)

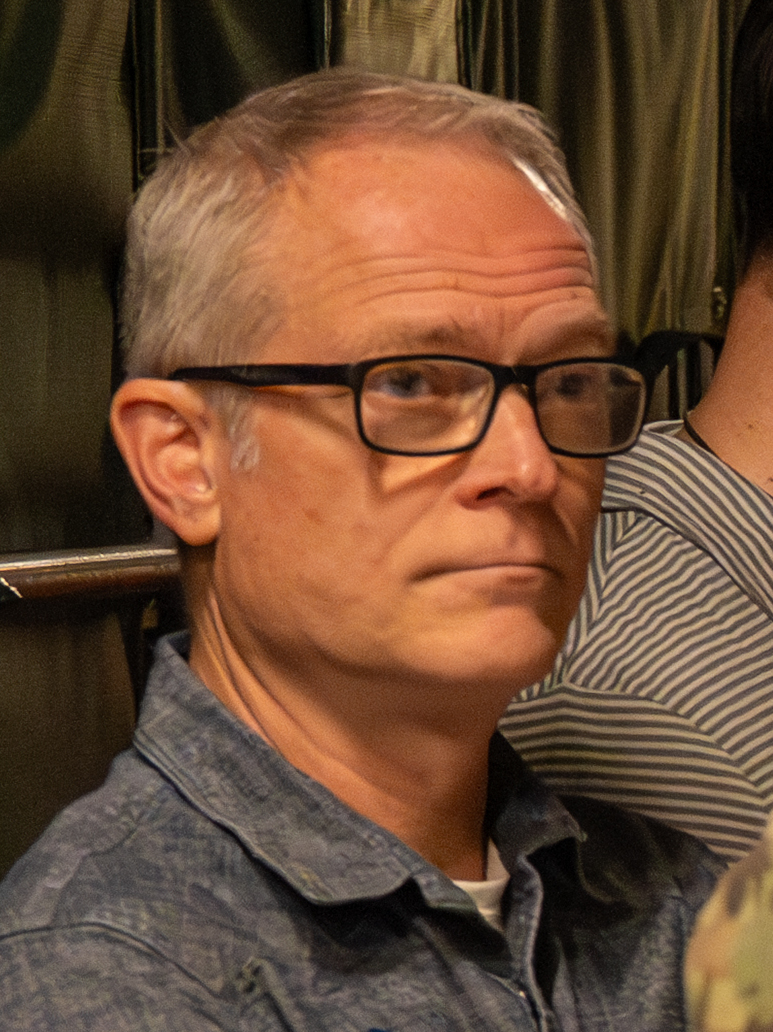
- Newman in 2025

Member of the Ohio House of Representatives for the 80th district
- Incumbent
- Assumed office January 6, 2025
- Preceded by: Jena Powell

Personal details
- Born: July 5, 1968 (age 58)
- Party: Republican
- Education: Union University (BA); Mid‑America Baptist Theological Seminary (MA)
- Profession: Pastor

Johnathan Newman (born July 5, 1968) is an American Christian pastor and Republican Party politician serving as a member of the Ohio House of Representatives for the 80th district since January 2025.

== Early life and education ==
Newman earned bachelor’s degrees in theology and sociology from Union University in Tennessee and a master’s degree in divinity from Mid‑America Baptist Theological Seminary.

== Religious and community leadership ==
Since the late 1990s, Newman has served as founding senior pastor of Koinos Church in Troy, Ohio. He has also been a certified marriage and family counselor and received the 2017 Dietrich Bonhoeffer Award from the Center for Christian Virtue for his pro‑life advocacy.

== Political career ==
=== Election ===
In November 2024, Newman was elected to represent Ohio’s open House District 80, defeating Democrat Melissa VanDyke with 74.9% of the vote. During the 2024 campaign, local media featured Newman’s pastoral background and community leadership in their coverage of the open-seat contest.

He was sworn into office on January 6, 2025.

=== Tenure ===
Newman serves as vice-chair of the House Agriculture Committee and is also a member of the Community Revitalization, Education, and Transportation committees.

He participated in the passage of the state operating budget, supported the Agriculture Appreciation Act (HB 65), sponsored legislation on annexation procedures, and backed a resolution urging repeal of the Johnson Amendment.

In June 2025, Newman co-sponsored the Ohio Prenatal Equal Protection Act, a proposed bill that would grant full legal personhood to fertilized embryos and criminalize abortion as homicide. He criticized the 2023 Ohio reproductive rights initiative (Issue 1), stating, “I think the passage of Issue 1 ... was the worst mistake Ohio ever made,” and acknowledged the tension between constituent will and his views.

== Personal life ==
Newman and his wife Jeni have three adult children.

== Electoral history ==
2024 Ohio 80th district House of Representatives general election
Party	Candidate	Votes	%
Republican	Johnathan Newman	48,115	74.9%
Democratic	Melissa Van Dyke	16,157	25.1%
Turnout		64,272	
