= John Mahoney (Ohio politician) =

American politician (1949–2011)

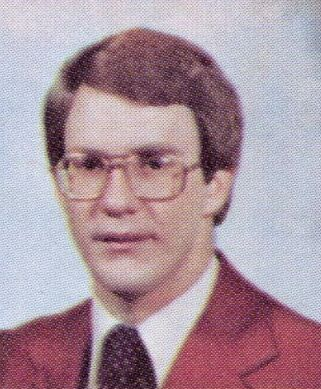

Member of the Ohio Senate from the 10th district
- In office January 3, 1977 – December 31, 1980
- Preceded by: Max Dennis
- Succeeded by: Mike DeWine

Personal details
- Born: September 9, 1949 Springfield, Ohio, U.S.
- Died: April 5, 2011 (aged 61) Columbus, Ohio, U.S.
- Party: Democratic

John K. Mahoney (September 9, 1949 – April 5, 2011) was a former member of the Ohio Senate, representing the 10th District from January 3, 1977 – December 31, 1980. While in the Senate, he was initiated reform that influenced what today is the Ohio Lottery. He died of lymphoma.

== Early life and education ==
Mahoney was born in Springfield, Ohio to Jack and Mary Ann Mahoney. He had six brothers and two sisters. He attended Catholic Central High School and Spalding University.

== Career ==
From 1973 to 1976, Mahoney was a Springfield City Commissioner. From 1977 to 1980, he represented the 10th district in the Ohio State Senate. From 1981 to 1985, Mahoney was chief of staff for Ohio Senate Democrats. In 1986, Mahoney became the deputy director of the Ohio Municipal League.

== See also ==
- Politics of Ohio
