= Ohio Prenatal Equal Protection Act =

Proposed 2025 Ohio law

Ohio General Assembly
- Long title: To enact sections 2903.24 and 2903.241 of the Revised Code to enact the Ohio Prenatal Equal Protection Act.
- Citation: O.H. Legis. Assemb. . Reg. Sess. 2025-2026 (2025).
- Territorial extent: Ohio

Legislative history
- Bill title: House Bill 370
- Introduced by: Levi Dean (R-71) and Johnathan Newman (R-80)
- Introduced: June 18, 2025

Summary
- Criminalizes abortion in Ohio except if needed to protect the life of the mother or in the case of miscarriages.
- Status: Pending

The Ohio Prenatal Equal Protection Act, also known as House Bill 370 (H.B. 370), is a proposed law in the state of Ohio that would criminalize abortion in most circumstances. Reproductive rights were codified in the Ohio Constitution following the passage of Issue 1 in 2023. The law intends to nullify Section 22 of Article 1 of the Ohio Constitution as per the Fourteenth Amendment.

== Provisions ==
The law would consider abortion as homicide per the Fourteenth Amendment to the United States Constitution, intending to nullify Section 22 of Article 1 of the Ohio Constitution. An exception would be included to protect the life of the mother, so long as "reasonable steps" are taken to prevent the death of the child, as well as in cases of miscarriages. In vitro fertilisation (IVF) would also likely be affected.

== Reactions ==
=== Support ===
The advocacy group End Abortion Ohio supports House Bill 370. They referred to Section 22 of Article I of the Ohio Constitution as null and void per the Equal Protection Clause.

=== Opposition ===
Planned Parenthood of Ohio opposes House Bill 370, claiming it is unconstitutional. Ohio Right to Life, an anti-abortion group, also opposes the bill because it would penalize mothers for having abortions.

== See also ==
- November 2023 Ohio Issue 1
- Abortion in Ohio
