= Terry Boose =

American politician

Member of the Ohio House of Representatives from the 57th district
- In office January 5, 2009 – December 31, 2016
- Preceded by: Tom Heydinger
- Succeeded by: Dick Stein

Personal details
- Born: February 23, 1956 (age 70) Norwalk, Ohio, U.S.
- Party: Republican
- Education: Bowling Green State University, Texas Tech University
- Profession: Fiscal Officer

Terry Boose (born February 23, 1956) is a former Republican member of the Ohio House of Representatives, representing the 57th District from 2009 to 2016.

== Background ==
Boose earned a bachelor's degree in business management from Bowling Green State University and a master's degree in business administration from Texas Tech University, and subsequently served as the fiscal officer for Norwalk Township in Huron County. He also served as Huron County Commissioner.

Boose and his wife have four children and reside in Norwalk, Ohio.

== Ohio House of Representatives ==
Unopposed in the primary, Boose was one of a few bright spots for Republican's in 2008, when he overcame Democrat Terry Traster with 53.59% of the vote to take the district.

He has gained notoriety by publicly speaking out against Governor Ted Strickland's award of economic stimulus money from the American Recovery and Re-Investment Act at the governor's own press conference. Boose criticized Strickland because the Ohio Department of Transportation district contained within his House District received the least amount of stimulus money of any district in the state while one of the counties within the district, Huron County had the highest unemployment in the state at the time.

Terry Boose was also a vocal opponent of House Bill 2 (128th General Assembly) which implemented many new fees including a $20 Late Vehicle Registration Fee which Boose later sought to remove with House Bill 428. Boose has taken right-libertarian positions on most political issues and is involved with the Tea Party Movement as a member of Norwalk's 9/12 Project Group. He strongly supported Senate Bill 5, a bill that was later overturned in a general election.

In the 2010 cycle, Boose won a second term against Democrat Greg Davidson with 62.29% of the vote. He serves on the committees of Ways and Means, Local Government (as vice chair), and Agriculture and Natural Resources. He also serves on the Great Lakes Commission and Great Lakes Basin Compact, the Lorain County Transportation Improvement District Board of Trustees and the Great Lakes – St. Lawrence River Basin Water Resources Compact Advisory Board.

Boose won a third term in 2012 with 54.12% over Democrat Matt Lark, and a fourth term in 2014 again against Lark by a 59% to 41% margin. Boose was term-limited in 2016.

== Policies, platforms and initiatives ==
Currently, Boose is proposing a 5 percent pay cut for all legislators and statewide elected officials until the state's gross-domestic product increases by at least 2.5 percent for two of three calendar years. The idea has come up consistently, notably since collective bargaining reform sought to cut pay for other state employees, a move that has proven controversial.

With Cheryl Grossman, Boose has also introduced an initiative to put on hold most new safety regulations for trucks weighing more than 10,000 pounds. Grossman has argued the new regulations are unnecessary and a burden for businesses.
