= Tom Heydinger =

American politician

Member of the Ohio House of Representatives from the 58th district
- In office May 21, 2008-December 31, 2008
- Preceded by: Matt Barrett
- Succeeded by: Terry Boose

Personal details
- Born: April 30, 1940 (age 86) Norwalk, Ohio
- Party: Democratic
- Education: Pontifical College Josephinum; University of Dayton; Ohio Northern Law School
- Profession: Lawyer

Tom Heydinger (August 24, 1940 – July 10, 2012) was a former judge and Democratic member of the Ohio House of Representatives who represented the 58th District briefly in 2008.

== Life and career ==
A native of Plymouth, Ohio, Heydinger served in the Vietnam War, where he flew helicopters for the United States Army. He also worked as a lawyer in the Judge Advocate General's Corps.

A former judge, Heydinger served on the bench in Crawford County, Ohio, and as an assistant to the Ohio Attorney General. He also worked as a prosecutor for Huron County, Ohio. In 1975, Heydinger was appointed by Ohio Governor John Gilligan to the Huron County Common Pleas Court, Probate Division, a controversial decision at the time because of the issue of whether he had actually practiced law the requisite number of years to qualify for judicial office. However, a writ of quo warranto (pursuant to the Ohio Revised Code) was never filed, and the Ohio Supreme Court never ruled on the matter. Heydinger served as probate judge from 1975 until 2003.

== Ohio House of Representatives ==
In early 2008, freshman representative Matt Barrett ran into ethics trouble after mistakenly showing pornographic content to high school students during a presentation. He subsequently resigned, leaving House Democrats to appoint a replacement to the seat. While numerous candidates applied for the position, Heydinger was chosen. He was sworn into office on May 21, 2008.

Initially, Heydinger sought to retain the seat in the 2008 election. However, Heydinger dropped out of the race, citing mounting health problems and influences from within the Ohio Democratic Party. The seat was won by Republican Terry Boose.
