= Steve Austria =

American politician (born 1958)

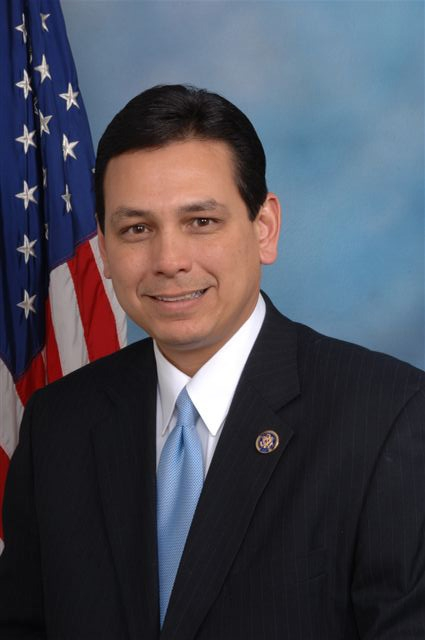
- Official portrait, 2009

Member of the U.S. House of Representatives from Ohio's 7th district
- In office January 3, 2009 – January 3, 2013
- Preceded by: Dave Hobson
- Succeeded by: Bob Gibbs

Member of the Ohio Senate from the 10th district
- In office January 3, 2001 – December 31, 2008
- Preceded by: Merle G. Kearns
- Succeeded by: Chris Widener

Member of the Ohio House of Representatives from the 76th district
- In office January 5, 1999 – December 31, 2000
- Preceded by: Marilyn Reid
- Succeeded by: Kevin DeWine

Personal details
- Born: Stephen Clement Austria; October 12, 1958 (age 67) Cincinnati, Ohio, U.S.
- Party: Republican
- Spouse: Eileen
- Children: 3
- Education: Marquette University (BA)

Stephen Clement Austria (born October 12, 1958) is an American politician who served as a U.S. representative for Ohio's 7th congressional district from 2009 to 2013. He is a member of the Republican Party. In December 2011, Austria announced his intention to not run for re-election for the 113th Congress in the 2012 elections. During his 14 years in elected office, Austria never lost an election.

== Early life, education and career ==
Austria was born in Cincinnati, the son of Jean C. (née Brockman), a nurse, and the late Dr. Clement G. Austria, a medical doctor. He grew up in Xenia, the eldest of nine children. He graduated from Carroll High School in 1977. His mother was of German descent, and his father was from Tiaong, Quezon, Philippines, and had moved to Ohio to attend medical school. He received a Bachelor of Arts degree from Marquette University in 1982 and began a career as a financial advisor. The Austria family was named the 1984 "Ohio Family of the Year" and was later presented with one of nine "The Great American Family" awards by First Lady Nancy Reagan. His father sat on the Greene County Central Committee of the Republican Party.

== Ohio House of Representatives ==
=== Elections ===
Austria was a member of the Ohio House of Representatives from 1998 until 2000. Austria won re-election in 2004 against Democratic challenger Charlie Hart in the general election with 65% of the vote.

=== Tenure ===
Austria was elected to the Ohio State Senate in 2001, representing the 10th District. He served two terms as the Senate House Majority Whip. In 1998, he sponsored the "Internet Child Protection Act", which was later enacted into law.

=== Committee assignments ===
He served as Chairman of the Senate Highways and Transportation and Senate Judiciary Committees.

== U.S. House of Representatives ==
=== Elections ===
2008

Austria won the Republican nomination for the 7th District after nine-term incumbent Dave Hobson retired. He defeated Democratic challenger Sharen Neuhardt in the general election, 59% to 41%. When Austria was elected, he made history by becoming the first son of a Filipino immigrant to be elected to the House of Representatives.

2010

Austria was elected to a second term by defeating Libertarian John D. Anderson, Democrat Bill Conner and Constitution Party David Easton.

2012

Following the 2010 United States census, Ohio lost two seats in the House of Representatives, due to relatively slow population growth. In subsequent redistricting, Austria's district, which stretched from Springfield to the southern suburbs of Columbus, was dismantled, with its territory split between three neighboring districts. Austria's home in Beavercreek was drawn into the 10th District (previously the 3rd District) of fellow Republican Mike Turner, who has served since 2003. The largest city in the district, Springfield, was drawn into the 8th District of House Speaker John Boehner. In December 2011, Austria announced his intention to retire at the 2012 elections, rather than run in a primary against Turner or move to run in another district. While one proposal would have seen the 10th retain roughly half of the territory from Turner and Austria's old districts, the final map drew Austria into a district that would have been over 75 percent new to him. State House Majority Leader Matt Huffman said that the new map "essentially eliminated" any realistic chance of Austria being able to stay in Congress.

=== Tenure ===
Austria is the third person of Filipino heritage (after Bobby Scott of Virginia and John Ensign of Nevada) to serve in the House as a voting member. He is the first first-generation Filipino to be elected to the United States Congress.

Austria is a staunch fiscal and social conservative, which is unusual in a district that has historically elected moderate Republicans. His campaign stressed Second Amendment rights, tax relief, opposition to abortion, and eliminating waste in government. He was a member of the Republican Study Committee and the Republican Main Street Partnership.

Austria co-wrote a letter with Rep. Steve Rothman in the wake of the Itamar attack claiming that any peace attempt in the Middle East had to recognize that "Palestinian incitement continues and there is almost no effort by them to promote coexistence and peace."

=== Committee assignments ===
- Committee on Appropriations
  - Subcommittee on Commerce, Justice, Science, and Related Agencies
  - Subcommittee on Military Construction, Veterans Affairs, and Related Agencies
  - Subcommittee on State, Foreign Operations, and Related Programs

== Post-congressional career ==
Austria has a consulting business, and serves on an advisory board for the Republican National Committee and remains active in politics. As of 2014, Austria is on the Republican State Central Committee, representing the 10th District, and sits on the Republican National Committee's Asian American Advisory Council.

== Personal life ==
Austria has lived in Beavercreek, a suburb of Dayton, for more than 20 years with his wife Eileen, and their three sons Brian, Kevin and Eric. Austria is a Catholic.

== See also ==
- List of Asian Americans and Pacific Islands Americans in the United States Congress

U.S. House of Representatives
Preceded by Dave Hobson	Member of the U.S. House of Representatives from Ohio's 7th congressional district 2009–2013	Succeeded by Bob Gibbs
U.S. order of precedence (ceremonial)
Preceded by Zack Space as Former U.S. Representative	Order of precedence of the United States as Former U.S. Representative	Succeeded by Anthony Gonzalez as Former U.S. Representative
