= Kyle Koehler =

American politician (born 1961)

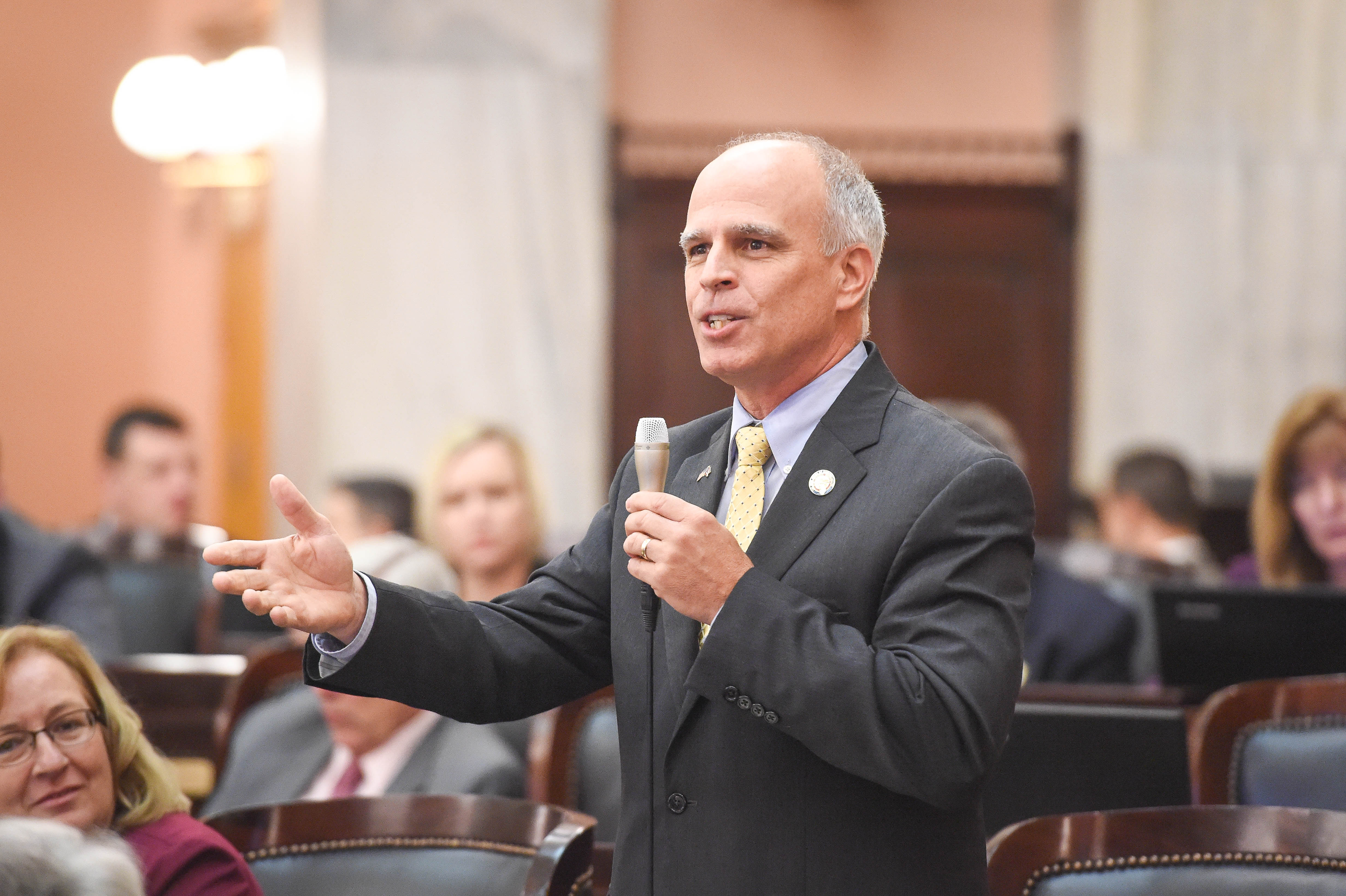

Member of the Ohio Senate from the 10th district
- Incumbent
- Assumed office January 1, 2025
- Preceded by: Bob Hackett

Member of the Ohio House of Representatives from the 79th district
- In office January 5, 2015 – December 31, 2022
- Preceded by: Ross McGregor
- Succeeded by: Bernard Willis

Personal details
- Born: October 5, 1961 (age 64) Springfield, Ohio, U.S.
- Party: Republican
- Spouse: Dr. Kathrin Koehler Psy.D
- Children: 5
- Education: Wright State University
- Profession: Software/Mechanical Engineer

Kyle Koehler (born October 5, 1961) is an American politician serving as a member of the Ohio Senate, representing the 10th district since 2025. After representing the 79th district in the Ohio House of Representatives from January 2015 to December 2022, Koehler ran for State Senate in 2024. He was elected to a four year term in the upper chamber by a 65%-35% margin. He was sworn into office on January 6 surrounded by his wife, children and grandchildren.

Koehler has been assigned to chair the Workforce Development Committee and vice-chair the Agriculture Committee. He has also been assigned to sit on Higher Education, Education (K-12) and Local Government Committees. Koehler is also the Chairman of the Ohio Sunset Review Committee.

Koehler (pronounced "kay-ler") was born and raised in Springfield, Ohio, attended Springfield's Catholic Central High School and then Wright State University. He and his family own a small business in Springfield.

In 2014, Koehler opted to make his first run for elected office, and decided to run for the Ohio House of Representatives to replace Ross McGregor who was term-limited. He faced Democrat Darryl Jackson in a competitive seat. Koehler went on to defeat Jackson 61%-39%.

In 2016, Koehler faced a challenge from Democrat Alex Wendt. Koehler won re-election in another 61%-39% victory.

In 2018, Koehler faced a challenge from Democrat Amanda Finfrock. Koehler won the 2018 general election by 19% in a 59.5%-40.5% victory.

In 2020, Koehler faced Cynthia Richards in his last campaign for State Representative (due to term-limits). Koehler won the 2020 general election by 26% in a 63.1%-36.9% victory.

Koehler won each of his general elections in 2014, 2016, 2018, and 2020 by margins of 22%, 22%, 19%, and 26% points respectively in a district that is considered a 50-50 district for Presidential Elections.

Representative Koehler chaired the Ohio House Agriculture and Rural Development Committee during the 133rd and 134th General Assemblies.

== Career ==
Kyle Koehler received his bachelor's degree from Wright State University in computer science. He spent seven years leading teams developing classified software surrounding signal analysis and data acquisition for government contractors.

While serving in the Ohio Senate, Koehler continues his work as Vice President of K.K. Tool Co. Inc. Koehler has used his extensive knowledge in computer technology to design and develop dies, fixtures and robotic weld fixtures using Solidworks 3D modeling software over the last 36 years.

== Marriage and family life ==
Kyle Koehler married Kathrin (Eimer) Koehler in July 1988. Kathrin Koehler, who is a licensed psychologist in the State of Ohio, worked as an independent counselor until taking a break to home educate their five children starting in 1999. She is currently back in private practice.

The Koehlers have five adult children. Four are married. The Koehlers have nine grandchildren as of April 2026.

== Payday Lending ==
Representative Koehler, along with Rep. Mike Ashford (D), spent the 132nd General Assembly fighting to bring reform to the payday lending industry in Ohio. Fighting for well over 13 months for movement on House Bill 123, Koehler successfully moved the bill out of Government Accountability and Oversight in April 2018. The Ohio House passed the bill on June 7 with a 71-17 bipartisan vote.

The bill spent four weeks in the Ohio Senate, where Senate Finance Chair, Scott Oelslager introduced Substitute House Bill 123. The Substitute House Bill, kept the structure of the original bill introduced by Reps Koehler and Ashford; but made adjustments to the fees and loan limits. Senate Finance and the full Senate passed SUB HB123 on July 10.

The Ohio House concurred on the Senate changes on July 24 after a furious floor debate. Governor John Kasich signed the bill six days later on July 30.

== The Fresh Start Act ==
Representative Koehler, introduced The Fresh Start Act (Ohio House Bill 263) in the 133rd General Assembly. The bill cleaned up over 800 pages of the Ohio Revised Code in dealing with Occupational Licensing in Ohio. The original bill restricted Occupational Licensing Boards from looking back more than five years on convictions and jail time for those seeing occupational licenses (everything from hairdressers to landscaping, engineers to nurses). The bill excluded any convinces for crimes that were violent or sexual in nature.

It passed out of the Ohio House (90-1) and was amended in the Senate to exclude fiduciary licenses and licenses to those dealing with the aged. The House unanimously concurred on the changes and the bill was signed into law by the Governor in early 2021.

“Nearly one in five Ohioans needs an occupational license to do their job,” Koehler said. “The Fresh Start Act is a comprehensive occupational licensing and criminal justice reform proposal that will assist Ohioans who have paid their debt to society and deserve more than to be treated as second-class citizens for the rest of their lives.”

== Duty To Retreat ==
In the lame duck session of the 133rd General Assembly, Representative Koehler made the move to amend Senate Bill 175 (R-Schaffer) with language to remove the Duty To Retreat from the Ohio Revised Code. This provision applies to a person located anywhere he is lawfully allowed to be (and not an aggressor in a confrontation) where they believe they are in immediate danger of bodily harm or death. The clarification has been debated for over 10 years in the Ohio Legislature.

Koehler worked closely with Senate President Larry Obhof and Speaker Bob Cupp (as well as the bill sponsor) to successfully get the Governor to sign amended Senate Bill 175 into law on January 4, 2021.

"In 2018, then gubernatorial candidate Mike DeWine promised the Buckeye Firearms Association at his campaign headquarters in Columbus that he would sign Stand Your Ground legislation. We sent him the most simple and straightforward repeal of Duty To Retreat. Senate Bill 175 provides this simple fix that will protect law-abiding gun owners," Koehler wrote in a statement following DeWine's signature.

== Committees ==
Rep. Koehler chaired the Ohio House Agriculture and Rural Development Committee for the 133rd and 134th General Assembly. He served all four of his terms on this committee. He also served four terms on the Ohio House Primary and Secondary Education Committee (formerly the Education Committee). In his final term, Chairman Koehler also served on the newly formed Technology and Innovation Committee.

In the 132nd General Assembly, Koehler served as Vice-Chair of Agriculture and Rural Development as well as on Education & Career Readiness. He was assigned to the newly formed Federalism & Interstate Relations Committee that focused on State's Rights issues including a number of gun bills.

In his first term in the 131st General Assembly, Representative Koehler served on the following committees: Agriculture and Rural Development, Economic & Workforce Development, and Education.

Koehler served on the Straight-A-Fund Governing Board as one of three appointed legislators on the eight member board.

Representative Koehler was appointed to the 21 member board of the Ohio Family Stability Commission.

As the Chair of the Ohio House Agriculture Committee, Koehler also was automatically appointed to the Ohio Expo Commission.

== Electoral history ==
Primary Election Results
Year	Office	Election	Subject	Party	Votes	%	Opponent	Party	Votes	%	Opponent	Party	Votes	%
2014	State Representative	Primary	Kyle Koehler	Republican	6,221	53.7%	Argeri Lagos	Republican	4,179	36.1%	Rick Chimento	Republican	1,185	10.2%

General Election Results
Year	Office	Election	Subject	Party	Votes	%	Subject	Party	Votes	%
2012	County Commissioner	General	Kyle Koehler	Republican	30,246	49.79%	David Hartley	Democratic	30,505	50.21%
2014	State Representative	General	Kyle Koehler	Republican	19,157	60.7%	Darrell Jackson	Democratic	12,388	39.3%
2016	State Representative	General	Kyle Koehler	Republican	29,687	60.53%	Alex Wendt	Democratic	19,360	39.47%
2018	State Representative	General	Kyle Koehler	Republican	23,387	59.4%	Amanda Finfrock	Democratic	16,016	40.6%
2020	State Representative	General	Kyle Koehler	Republican	32,705	63.1%	Cynthia Richards	Democratic	19,127	36.9%
2024	State Senator	General	Kyle Koehler	Republican	108,244	65.2%	Dan McGregor	Democratic	57,702	34.8%

2024 Primary Election Results
Year	Office	Election	Subject	Party	Votes	%	Opponent	Party	Votes	%
2024	State Senator	Primary	Kyle Koehler	Republican	24,501	63.7%	Carolyn Destefani	Republican	13,938	36.3%

== Links ==
- official campaign site
- Facebook page
- Twitter
