= Ross McGregor =

American politician (born 1965)

Member of the Ohio House of Representatives from the 79th district
- In office October 5, 2005-December 31, 2014
- Preceded by: Merle G. Kearns
- Succeeded by: Kyle Koehler

Personal details
- Born: May 18, 1965 (age 61) Springfield, Ohio
- Party: Republican
- Education: Urbana University
- Profession: President

Ross McGregor (born May 18, 1965) is a former Republican member of the Ohio House of Representatives, representing the 79th District from 2005 to 2014.

== Career ==
McGregor received his bachelor's degree from Urbana University in business administration. Along with his duties in the House, McGregor is President of Pentaflex, Inc.

== Ohio House of Representatives ==
When Merle Kearns resigned from the House to take a position under Governor Bob Taft, McGregor was one of over a dozen candidates who sought to replace her. Despite not being recommended by Clark County Republicans, McGregor nonetheless received the appointment, and was seated in October 2005.

In his 2006 reelection bid, McGregor was seen by Democrats as a top target. They fielded former mayor and city commissioner Dale Henry to try and knock him off. While the race was contentious, McGregor maintained his seat with 53.40% of the electorate.

Even with his 2006 victory, McGregor was again a top target in 2008, where Richard Spangler was fielded to run against him. However, once again, McGregor was victorious with a narrow victory of 500 votes, or 50.59%.

For a third term, McGregor faced initial primary opposition from the right, due greatly to numerous votes McGregor had made on social issues. The opponent was eighteen-year-old Ethan Reynolds, who attended the local high school. However, he easily secured the nomination with 71.18% of the votes. McGregor easily defeated Democratic challenger Greg Krouse in the general election with 59.7% of the vote.

Speaker of the House William G. Batchelder has named McGregor as a member of the Republican majority caucus' Policy Committee for the 129th General Assembly. He also is serving on the committees of Insurance; Commerce and Labor; Transportation, Public Safety and Homeland Security; and Finance and Appropriations and its Transportation Subcommittee (as Chairman). He is also the chairman of the Joint Committee on Agency Rule Review; and the Commission on Minority Health.

McGregor won a final term in 2012 with 55.65% of the vote over Democrat David Herier.

== Initiatives and positions ==
In February 2011, McGregor announced his intention to renew a bipartisan effort to ban discrimination in employment and housing based on sexual orientation or gender identity, an effort which passed the Ohio House in 2009 but failed in the state Senate. He introduced House Bill 335, legislation intended to do just that, on September 27, 2011; the bill was assigned to the House committee on Commerce & Labor.

McGregor is also sponsoring a bill that would create the Ohio Fraud Reporting System to allow Ohioans and public employees to report fraud, waste and abuse of taxpayer dollars.

As Chairman of the Transportation Subcommittee of the Finance and Appropriations Committee, McGregor is presiding over the biannual transportation budget. The bill passed the House in early March 2011.
