= Matt Barrett =

American politician

Matthew Barrett

Member of the Ohio House of Representatives from the 58th district
- In office January 2, 2007 – April 28, 2008
- Preceded by: Dan White
- Succeeded by: Tom Heydinger

Personal details
- Born: March 4, 1970 (age 56) Amherst, Ohio
- Party: Democratic
- Education: Cleveland State University College of Law
- Profession: Lawyer

Matt Barrett is a former Democratic member of the Ohio House of Representatives, who represented the 58th District from 2007 to 2008.

== Life and career ==
Barrett is a graduate of Embry Riddle University and of the Cleveland State University College of Law. He is licensed to practice law in Ohio, and the federal court systems. He is married with several children. In 1997, Barrett began his political career by running at-large for city council in Amherst, Ohio, he would be reelected three more times.

== Ohio House of Representatives ==
In 2004, Barrett ran for state representative against Kathleen Walcher, but lost 53.99% to 46.01%. However, Walcher resigned midway through her term. Barrett ran again for the seat in 2006, and this time defeated Walcher's replacement, Dan White, by a margin of 51.20% to 48.80%. He was sworn into office on January 2, 2007.

Only eighteen months into his first term, Barrett was caught in an ethics scandal after mistakenly allowing pornography to be shown to high school children during a presentation. While he initially blamed it on his teenage son, he later acknowledged that the mistake was his. He soon after resigned, and was succeeded by Tom Heydinger.
