= Chris Widener =

American politician

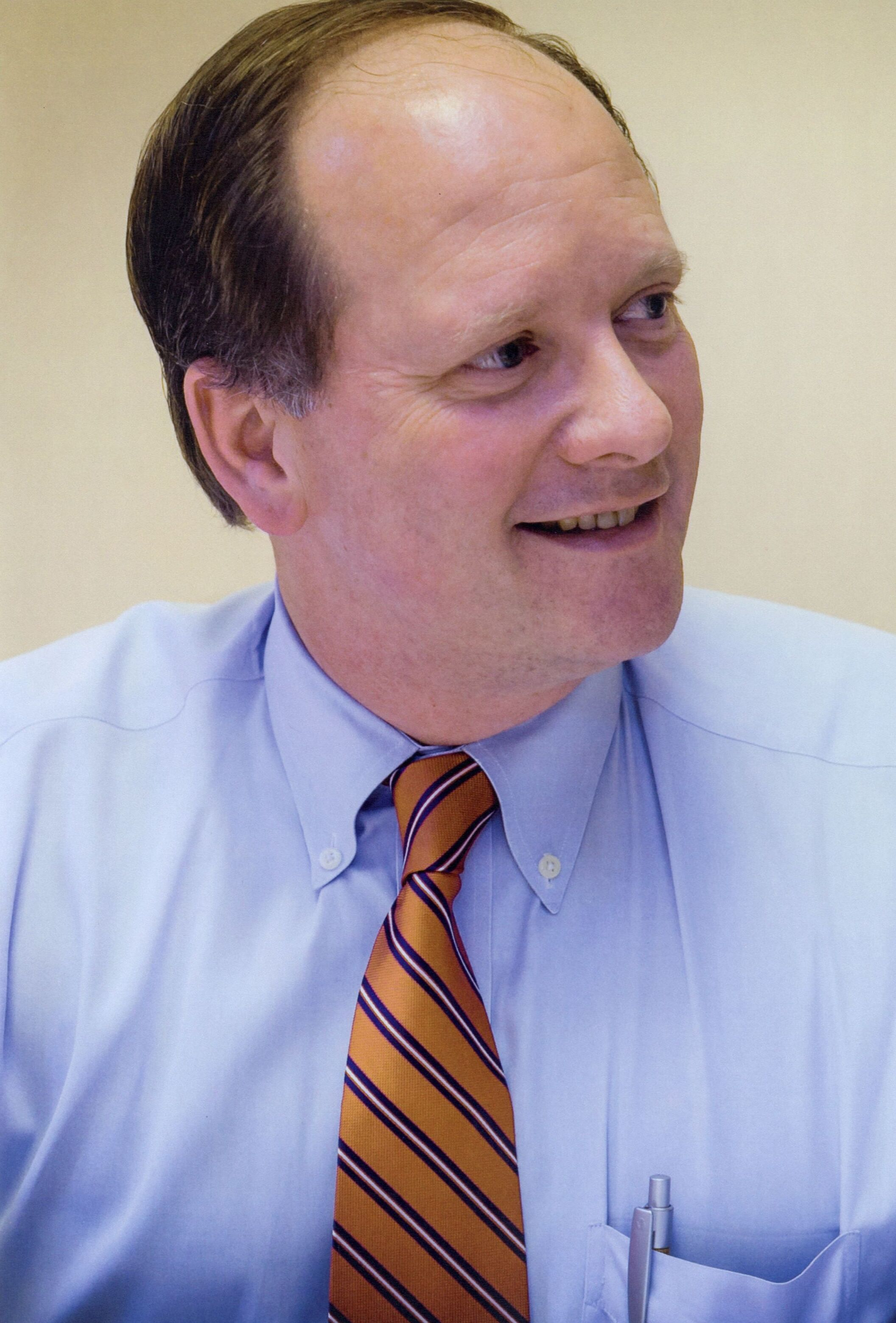

Member of the Ohio Senate from the 10th district
- In office January 5, 2009 – January 21, 2016
- Preceded by: Steve Austria
- Succeeded by: Bob Hackett

Member of the Ohio House of Representatives from the 84th district
- In office January 3, 2003 – December 31, 2008
- Preceded by: Ron Rhine
- Succeeded by: Bob Hackett
- In office December 8, 1999 – December 31, 2000
- Preceded by: Joe Haines
- Succeeded by: Merle G. Kearns

Personal details
- Born: August 22, 1963 (age 63) Springfield, Ohio, U.S.
- Party: Republican
- Spouse: Sally Widener (2 children)
- Education: University of Cincinnati
- Profession: Architect

Christopher Widener (born August 22, 1963) was the President pro Tempore of the Ohio Senate, and represented the 10th Senate District, which includes Madison, Clark and Greene counties. Before the Senate, he served three terms non-consecutively in the Ohio House of Representatives. He is a Republican.

== Career ==
After graduation from the University of Cincinnati, Widener served two terms on the Mad River-Greene Local Board of Education before starting his legislative career. His resume includes a stint as a civil service architect at Wright-Patterson Air Force Base, where he also served as the base's first full-time historic preservation officer until 1989.

Widener was appointed to his first term as a member of the Ohio House of Representatives in 1999, but lost the party nomination to reelection to Merle G. Kearns, a prominent state Senator who was facing term limits. However, after redistricting occurred in 2002, Widener won a term beginning in 2003.

In the 2004 cycle, Widener again faced a primary challenge against fellow Republican Robert Rogers III. He defeated Rogers with 65% of the vote. He easily won reelection in 2006 with 60% of the vote.

In January 2016, Widener announced his retirement after nearly two decades of public service.

== Ohio Senate ==
In 2008, Senator Steve Austria was term limited and running for Congress, and Widener declared his candidacy for his Senate seat. In the primary, he faced W. Reed Madden and James Howard, and won about 67% of the electorate. In the general election, Widener faced Clark County Commissioner Roger Tackett. While Democrats initially thought the district as potentially competitive, Widener won with 62% of the vote.

Widener served as Chairman of the Energy & Public Utilities Committee in the 128th General Assembly, and in the 129th General Assembly, Senate President Tom Niehaus named Widener as Chairman of the Senate Finance Committee, He also serves on the State Controlling Board; and to the State Council on Educational Opportunity for Military Children. As Chairman of the Finance Committee, Widener played a leading role in shaping the biennium budget. Widener was also a key player on the conference committee on the budget, where the budget was finished, and helped to pass the final budget for 2012-2013.

In 2012, Widener won reelection to a second term, defeating Jeff Robertson with 62% of the vote. Widener has faced controversy for trying to shield public records related to Senate parking key cards. For this and other reasons, the Cleveland Plain Dealer in an editorial named Widener the worst person in the Ohio General Assembly.

=== Committee assignments ===
- Committee on Rules

== Electoral history ==
Ohio Senate 10th District: Results 2008 to 2012
Year	Democrat	Votes	Pct	Republican	Votes	Pct
2008	Roger Tackett	56,770	37.33%	Chris Widener	95,324	62.67%
2012	Jeff Roberson	58,021	38.30%	Chris Widener	93,472	61.70%

Ohio House 84th District: Results 2002 to 2006
Year	Democrat	Votes	Pct	Republican	Votes	Pct
2006	Connie Crockett	16,660	39.07%	Chris Widener	25,978	60.93%
2004	William Eby	17,972	34.13%	Chris Widener	34,598	65.87%
2002	Natalie Tackett	12,974	37.40%	Chris Widener	21,730	62.60%
