= Merle G. Kearns =

American politician (1938–2014)

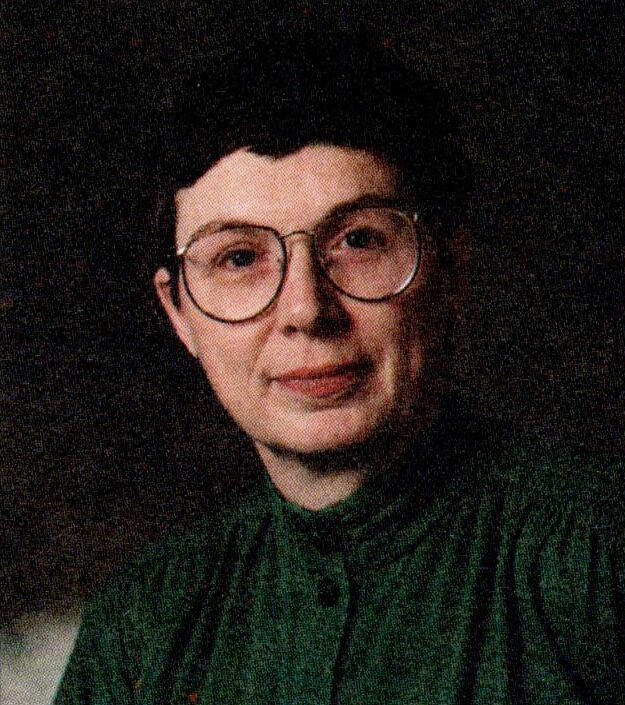

Member of the Ohio House of Representatives from the 72nd district
- In office January 3, 2001 – August 25, 2005
- Preceded by: Chris Widener
- Succeeded by: Ross McGregor

Member of the Ohio Senate from the 10th district
- In office January 3, 1991 – December 31, 2000
- Preceded by: Dave Hobson
- Succeeded by: Steve Austria

Personal details
- Born: May 19, 1938 Bellefonte, Pennsylvania
- Died: August 9, 2014 (aged 76) Columbus, Ohio
- Party: Republican

Merle Grace Kearns (May 19, 1938 – August 9, 2014) was a member of the Ohio House of Representatives. She represented the 72nd House District and served as majority leader in the 126th General Assembly.

Prior to her stint in the Ohio House, Kearns was a member of the Ohio Senate from 1991 to 2000, representing the 10th Senate District.

== Formative years and family life ==
Born in Bellefonte, Pennsylvania on May 19, 1938, Kearns received her bachelor's degree in home economics from Ohio State University.

Kearns lived in Springfield, Ohio.

== Public service career ==
Early on, during her public service career, Kearns served as a county commissioner in Clark County, Ohio.

Prior to her election to the Ohio House of Representatives, Kearns served in the Ohio Senate from 1991 to 2000, representing the 10th district.

She then represented the 72nd district in the Ohio House of Representatives, where she was elected as majority leader during the 126th General Assembly.

== Death ==
Kearns died in Columbus, Ohio on August 9, 2014.
