= Kathleen Walcher =

American politician

Kathleen Reed Walcher

Member of the Ohio House of Representatives from the 58th district
- In office January 3, 2003-May 25, 2006
- Preceded by: J. Tom Lendrum
- Succeeded by: Dan White

Personal details
- Party: Republican

Kathleen Reed (formerly Kathleen Walcher) is a former member of the Ohio House of Representatives. She served from 2003 to 2006.

== Career ==
Walcher held multiple positions in county government, including ten years as the Huron County Common Pleas Court clerk, time as Huron County's deputy clerk and the sheriff's civil deputy.

Walcher was elected to represent the 58th district in the Ohio House of Representatives in 2002 after beating Ken Bailey with approximately 58 percent of the vote.

Walcher Reed resigned her seat in 2006 during her second term. Dan White was appointed to replace her.

== Personal life ==
In 2005, Kathleen changed her last name from Walcher to Reed due to dissolution of marriage.
