= Dan White (Ohio politician) =

American politician

Member of the Ohio House of Representatives from the 58th district
- In office May 25, 2006-December 31, 2006
- Preceded by: Kathleen Walcher
- Succeeded by: Matt Barrett

Personal details
- Party: Republican

Dan White is a former Ohio House of Representatives member who was appointed to replace Kathleen Walcher in 2006.

He lost the 2006 election for the seat to Matt Barrett.
