= Kevin DeWine =

American politician (born 1967)

Chair of the Ohio Republican Party
- In office January 16, 2009 – April 13, 2012
- Preceded by: Robert T. Bennett
- Succeeded by: Robert T. Bennett

Member of the Ohio House of Representatives from the 70th district
- In office January 3, 2001 – January 16, 2009
- Preceded by: Steve Austria
- Succeeded by: Jarrod Martin

Personal details
- Born: October 11, 1967 (age 58) Springfield, Ohio, U.S.
- Party: Republican
- Spouse: Kelle Caldwell
- Relatives: Mike DeWine (second cousin); Pat DeWine (second cousin once removed)
- Education: University of Dayton (BS); Wright State University (MBA)
- Profession: Businessman

Kevin DeWine (born October 11, 1967) is an American businessman and politician who chaired the Ohio Republican Party from 2009 until 2012. Previously, he was a member of the Ohio House of Representatives from 2001 to 2009.

DeWine graduated from Fairborn High School in 1986, received his Bachelor of Science degree in marketing from the University of Dayton in 1990, and earned an MBA from Wright State University in 1996. The DeWine family resides in Fairborn, Ohio. Before holding public office, Kevin was a regional development manager for the Dayton Power and Light Company. He is the second cousin of R. Michael DeWine, who currently serves as Governor of Ohio.

When Steve Austria vacated his seat to run for the Ohio Senate, DeWine was elected to represent the 76th district in the Ohio House in 2000, defeating Democrat Eric Marcus and independent candidate Christina Turner, winning 62.3% of the vote. In 2002, in the 70th district after redistricting, he defeated Democrat Lawrence Gordon with 71.7% of the vote. He faced Gordon again in 2004, DeWine won with 69.3% of the vote.

In 2006, DeWine won his fourth term with 60.4% of the vote against Democrat Kevin O'Brien. DeWine was elected Speaker pro tempore in the 127th Ohio General Assembly. He was the chair of the Rules and Reference committee, and also serves on the Finance & Appropriations and the State Government & Elections Committees. He was not eligible to run for a fifth term due to term limits.

On January 16, 2009, he was elected unanimously as chairman of the Republican Party of Ohio. He was reelected as chairman in 2011. He was replaced in April 2012 by Robert T. Bennett, following DeWine's resignation over disputes with Ohio Governor John Kasich.
