= Senator Blessing =

Senator Blessing may refer to:

- Lou Blessing (born 1948), Ohio State Senate and father of Louis Blessing
- Louis Blessing (born 1980), Ohio State Senate
