= Bill Seitz =

American politician (born 1954)

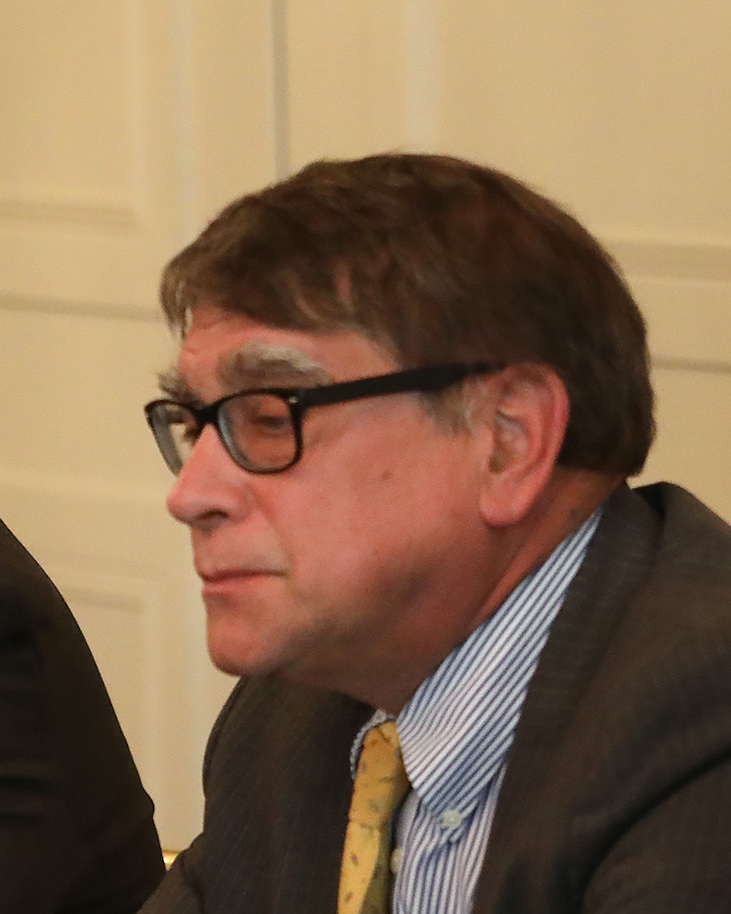

Majority Leader of the Ohio House of Representatives
- In office June 7, 2017 – January 6, 2025
- Preceded by: Dorothy Pelanda
- Succeeded by: Marilyn John

Member of the Ohio House of Representatives from the 30th district
- In office January 3, 2017 – January 6, 2025
- Preceded by: Louis Terhar
- Succeeded by: Mike Odioso
- In office January 3, 2001 – October 9, 2007
- Preceded by: Cheryl Winkler
- Succeeded by: Robert Mecklenborg

Member of the Ohio Senate from the 8th district
- In office October 10, 2007 – December 31, 2016
- Preceded by: Patricia Clancy
- Succeeded by: Louis Terhar

Personal details
- Born: William J. Seitz III; October 29, 1954 (age 71) Cincinnati, Ohio, U.S.
- Party: Republican
- Education: University of Cincinnati (BA, JD)

William J. Seitz III (born October 29, 1954) is the state representative for the 30th district of the Ohio House of Representatives. He is a Republican. The district consists of Cheviot, Delhi Township, Green as well as portions of Cincinnati, in Hamilton County. Formerly, Seitz represented the same seat from 2001 to 2007. He served in the Ohio Senate from 2007 to 2016. He has also served as Majority Leader since 2017 serving under five different speakers and two interim speakers. After 24 years in the Ohio General Assembly, Seitz has decided to retire at the end of his term in 2024.

== FirstEnergy scandal ==
Rep. Bill Seitz supported House Bill 6 (HB 6), the controversial 2019 energy law later tied to what prosecutors described as the largest corruption scandal in Ohio history. The scheme involved $60 million in bribes from FirstEnergy Corporation funneled through dark money groups to secure passage of the legislation. See Ohio nuclear bribery scandal.

According to campaign finance records, Seitz received $7,000 from the FirstEnergy political action committee in 2018, during the period leading up to the introduction and passage of HB 6.

HB 6 authorized a $1.3 billion ratepayer-funded bailout for two nuclear plants formerly owned by a FirstEnergy subsidiary.

Seitz was not charged in the federal bribery case, but his support for HB 6 and campaign contributions from FirstEnergy drew criticism from watchdog groups concerned about utility influence on Ohio lawmakers.

=== Vote on the Expulsion of Larry Householder ===
During the 134th Ohio General Assembly, Bill Seitz voted against the expulsion of former House Speaker Larry Householder, who had been federally indicted and later convicted in connection with the Ohio nuclear bribery scandal tied to House Bill 6. The Ohio House voted 75–21 to expel Householder, with Bill Seitz among the 21 Republican members who opposed the resolution.

== Life and career ==
After graduating from the University of Cincinnati in 1975 with a BA in History, summa cum laude, he attended the University of Cincinnati School of Law, obtaining his JD in 1978 with the honors of being selected for the Law Review and named a member of the Order of the Coif. Starting in 1978, Seitz was joined the Taft, Stettinius and Hollister law firm as an associate. He became a partner of the firm in 1986 a position he held until becoming Of Counsel in 2013. Seitz then joined Dinsmore & Shohl in 2014 as Of Counsel.

Seitz started his public career as a member of the Cincinnati Board of Education, eventually becoming Vice President of the board and also served on the St. Antoninus Parish Education Commission. He later was twice elected as a Green Township Trustee, becoming Chairman on one occasion. He also served as President of the Hamilton County Township Association.

In 2000, with incumbent State Representative Cheryl Winkler unable to run again due to term limits, Seitz was nominated to succeed her. He handily won election in 2000, and was reelected in 2002, 2004, and 2006.

In 2004, Seitz was mentioned as a potential successor to Lou Blessing Jr. in the Ohio Senate. However, he chose to remain in the House, and the Senate seat was won by Patty Clancy. When State Rep. and Majority Leader Merle Kearns resigned midway through 2005 to take a place in the cabinet of Governor Bob Taft her absence left a hole in the majority leadership team, leading to a shuffle by Speaker Jon Husted, and colleagues appointed Seitz to become the new Assistant Majority Whip. Seitz served as Majority Whip in the 127th General Assembly.

When Senator Patty Clancy announced that she would resign her seat midway through 2007, Seitz was mentioned as the front-runner for the appointment to replace her. In October 2007, Senate Republicans appointed Seitz to finish the remainder of Clancy's term. Seitz easily won election to the seat in 2008. For the 129th General Assembly, Seitz ran for a leadership position, but lost President Pro Tempore to Keith Faber and Majority Leader to Jimmy Stewart.

After Seitz voted against the controversial legislation that would greatly hamper collective bargaining for public employees, Senate President Tom Niehaus stripped him of his chairmanship of the Senate Government Oversight Committee. While Niehaus stated that it was due to his failure to keep another member informed about changes to a bill, many have speculated it was a political repercussion for voting against the measure. Seitz has called the move unacceptable and disagrees with the decision. Seitz later struck back with a memo stating that Faber had falsely accused him of doing so, stating that both Niehaus and Faber had acted disingenuously. Seitz won a second full term in the Senate in 2012, defeating Democrat Richard Luken with 62% of the vote.

Seitz is currently on the board of directors of the American Legislative Exchange Council (ALEC), a nonprofit partnership of conservative legislators and private sector lobbyists that craft model legislation for those legislators to sponsor.

== Ohio House of Representatives ==
In 2016, Seitz was term-limited in the Ohio Senate and announced he would seek his former seat in the House. Louis Terhar, who represented that seat, in turn ran for Seitz's Senate seat. He won the seat with over 73% of the vote against Democrat Mark A. Childers.

Seitz sits on the House Criminal Justice Committee.

In March 2016, Seitz introduced HB 296, which would require a monetary payment (bond) for vote centers aka polling centers/places to remain open after their usual closing time of 7:30pm. He proposed the bill after two separate judges extended voting hours at two different polling centers, one due to technical glitches which delayed voting, and another because of a fatal car accident on an interstate which delayed traffic to the vote center. Seitz claimed the bond was necessary because "activist judges" could always find a reason to keep vote centers open. Governor John Kasich eventually vetoed the bill.

In 2018, Rep. Kristin Boggs and Rep. Laura Lanese introduced HB 561, a bill that would eliminate the spousal exemptions for offenses of rape, sexual battery, unlawful sexual conduct with a minor, gross sexual imposition, sexual imposition and inportuning. Rep. Seitz was the only member of the committee to vote in opposition to the bill.

In 2021, Seitz defended a heavily gerrymandered redistricting map that gave Republicans an advantage in 12 of Ohio's 15 districts. Seitz said, "Fair, ladies and gentlemen, is in the eyes of the beholder."

In 2023, after nearly 24 years in the Ohio General Assembly, Seitz, was term limited in the Ohio House and has decided to not seek election to return to the Ohio Senate—he has instead decided to retire. He said in an interview about his decision to retire, "I'll be 70 years old by the end of my term and I don't want to be a blithering idiot like Joe Biden, so I think that's probably long enough."

== Sexual harassment controversy ==
On January 24, 2018, the website 3rd Rail Politics reported Republican legislators' alleged sexist and demeaning comments toward women at a roast for outgoing Ohio House Speaker Cliff Rosenberger's chief of staff Mike Dittoe. Held at the Athletic Club of Columbus just down the street from the Capital Building, the event was attended by legislators, lobbyists and campaign contributors.

"Representative William Seitz (R-Cincinnati) called out former Rep. Diana Fessler, calling her a nutjob who "wore a tin foil hat." More demeaning still, he compared her to his current Southwest Ohio colleague Rep. Candice Keller. Saving the best for last, he imagined certain legislators doing their work "set to music." Former Senator Cliff Hite, who as first reported by 3rd Rail was drummed out of office for disturbing allegations of harassing a female statehouse staffer, could have Marvin Gaye's "Let's Get It on," Seitz joked. "Or better yet," he added, "The Answer is Blowing in the Wind." Not content to just smack one chamber, he added a similar off-color double entendre to describe the song for former Rep. Wes Goodman. [Not suitable for print].

These remarks took place the same week House members received sexual harassment training mandated as a result of recent local and national scandals.

Days later, Seitz apologized for the remarks, calling them "irresponsible". Ohio Speaker Cliff Rosenberger, in a statement, said he expects Seitz to be "more thoughtful" and "more respectful" in the future.

State Reps. Nickie Antonio, Teresa Fedor and Michele Lepore-Hagan and Kathleen Clyde told Republican House Speaker Clifford Rosenberger that Seitz should resign, a move Seitz called "politically motivated".

Soon after, an anonymous woman filed a complaint, stating that Seitz's remarks worsened an already hostile working environment in the Statehouse. Republican Attorney General Mike DeWine paid $12,000 to Taft Stettinius & Hollister to conduct an internal investigation. Taft Stettinius and Hollister not only gave DeWine substantial campaign contributions, the firm employed Seitz for over 3 decades. Taft's investigators conducted only three interviews - of Seitz and two witnesses - then concluded Seitz had not violated the House's Sexual Harassment Policies. The review appeared to exclude any witnesses that were offended by Seitz's remarks, or any victims of Statehouse sexual harassment.

The Toledo Blade called for second investigation "with no conflict of interest".

Rep. Michele Lepore-Hagan said, "...interviewing only two of the more than 100 people who attended the event where Rep. Seitz degraded women, and then burying the report makes it clear that the leadership of the House and AG DeWine wanted to whitewash this particular incident".

State Reps. Teresa Fedor (D-Toledo) and Nickie J. Antonio (D-Lakewood) asked Ohio Attorney General (AG) Mike DeWine to hire an objective third party to reopen the harassment investigation of Rep. Bill Seitz (R-Cincinnati).

An ethics grievance was filed with the Ohio Supreme Court against firm partner Stuart Dornette, regarding the firm's failure to disclose this conflict of interest. Dornette has contributed to Seitz's political campaigns. Seitz referred to the complainant as a "knucklehead".

== Electoral history ==
Election results
Year	Office	Election	Votes for Seitz	%	Opponent	Party	Votes	%
2000	Ohio House of Representatives	General	34,687	64.45%	Jean Siebenaler	Democrat	19,129	35.55%
2002	Ohio House of Representatives	General	28,907	76.02%	Bob Klug	Democrat	9,120	23.98%
2004	Ohio House of Representatives	General	43,306	72.90%	Ann Thompson	Democrat	16,097	27.10%
2006	Ohio House of Representatives	General	36,218	100%				
2008	Ohio Senate	General	101,944	59.49%	Daniel McCarthy	Democrat	69,425	40.51%
2012	Ohio Senate	General	104,852	61.5%	Richard G. Luken	Democrat	65,744	38.5%
2016	Ohio House of Representatives	General	40,718	73.11%	Mark Childers	Democrat	14,975	26.89%
2018	Ohio House of Representatives	General	33,652	69.3%	Clayton Adams	Democrat	14,886	30.7%
2020	Ohio House of Representatives	General	42,269	72%	Tom Roll	Independent	16,426	28%
2022	Ohio House of Representatives	General	34,356	71.5%	Alissa Mayhaus	Democrat	13,701	28.5%

== Popular culture ==
The Seitz Cut and The Seitz Cut Part II are feature length YouTube videos that have been made compiling Seitz's speeches from his time in the House and Senate.

Ohio House of Representatives
Preceded by Dorothy Pelanda	Majority Leader of the Ohio House of Representatives; 2017–2025	Succeeded by Marilyn John
