= Ohio's 8th senatorial district =

American legislative district

Ohio's 8th State Senate district
Senator
| Louis Blessing; R–Colerain Township, Hamilton County, Ohio |
- Demographics: 75.3% White; 17.2% Black; 2.6% Hispanic; 2.8% Asian; 1.8% Native American; 0.1% Hawaiian/Pacific Islander
- Population (2020) • Voting age • Citizens of voting age: 358,233; 274,181; 262,379

Ohio's 8th senatorial district changed with the 2023 redistricting and now is composed of Hamilton County outside of the City of Cincinnati, except for a small piece of North Eastern Hamilton County that is in senatorial district 7. It encompasses the 27, 29, and 30 Ohio House Districts.

The current Ohio Senator is Republican Louis Blessing.

== Historically ==
Before the 2023 redistricting, Ohio's 8th senatorial district has been based in Cincinnati, Ohio and comprised the western portion of Hamilton County and encompassed Ohio House districts 28, 29 and 30. It has a Cook PVI of R+9.

== List of senators ==
| Senator | Party | Term | Notes |
|---|---|---|---|
| Stanley Aronoff | Republican | January 3, 1967 – December 31, 1996 | Aronoff served as Senate President from 1989 to 1996 and opted not to seek re-election in 1996. |
| Lou Blessing | Republican | January 6, 1997 – December 31, 2004 | Blessing was term-limited in 2004. |
| Patricia Clancy | Republican | January 3, 2005 – October 9, 2007 | Clancy resigned prior to the expiration of her term to take a county position. |
| Bill Seitz | Republican | October 10, 2007 – December 31, 2016 | Seitz was term-limited in 2016. |
| Louis Terhar | Republican | January 3, 2017 – September 3, 2019 | Resigned on September 3, 2019 due to health issues |
| Louis Blessing III | Republican | October 9, 2019 – Present | Incumbent |
