= Robert Mecklenborg =

American politician

Member of the Ohio House of Representatives from the 30th district
- In office October 9, 2007 – August 2, 2011
- Preceded by: Bill Seitz
- Succeeded by: Louis Terhar

Personal details
- Born: April 1, 1952 (age 74) Cincinnati, Ohio
- Party: Republican
- Education: Ohio University, University of Cincinnati
- Profession: Attorney

Robert Paul Mecklenborg (born April 1, 1952) is a former member of the Ohio House of Representatives, who represented the 30th district since his appointment in 2007. As chairman of the state government and elections committee, he introduced a bill to require voters to produce state-issued photo identification in order to vote.

== Life and career ==
Mecklenborg graduated from the Roman Catholic St. Xavier High School in 1970. After receiving a Bachelor of Arts from Ohio University, he obtained a J.D. degree from the University of Cincinnati College of Law. He was licensed to practice law in Ohio in 1978 and in Federal Court for the Southern District in 1983.

Mecklenborg served as solicitor and prosecutor for the Cleves, a village in Hamilton County with a population of 2,735 and a land area of 1.58 sq. miles. He is also a former law director and a former assistant county prosecutor for the city of Cheviot, a residential suburb of Cincinnati. He is a member of the executive and central committees of the Hamilton County, Ohio Republican Party.

== Ohio House of Representatives ==
With the endorsement of the Hamilton County Republican Party, Mecklenborg was appointed to succeed Bill Seitz in the 30th House District in the Ohio legislature in 2007. He was seated October 9, 2007.

In the 2008 primary, Mecklenborg won the Republican Party nomination for the 30th House District seat. In the general election, Mecklenborg defeated Democrat Bob Klug by nearly 29,000 votes.

He retained the 30th House District seat in 2010 in the campaign against Democrat Richard Luken. He chaired the Ohio House state government and elections committee and served on the committees of finance and appropriations, the higher education subcommittee, and the judiciary and ethics committees. He was a member of the Ohio Arts Council and the State Victims Assistance Advisory Committee.
