= Louis Terhar =

American politician

Member of the Ohio Senate from the 8th district
- In office January 3, 2017 – September 3, 2019
- Preceded by: Bill Seitz
- Succeeded by: Louis Blessing

Member of the Ohio House of Representatives from the 30th district
- In office September 14, 2011 – December 31, 2016
- Preceded by: Robert Mecklenborg
- Succeeded by: Bill Seitz

Personal details
- Born: September 28, 1949 (age 77) Cincinnati, Ohio, U.S.
- Party: Republican
- Education: United States Naval Academy, Syracuse University, Harvard University
- Profession: Businessman

Louis Terhar (born September 28, 1949) is an American businessman and former politician serving as a Republican member of the Ohio Senate, representing the 8th district. The district includes portions of Hamilton County. Formerly, he served in the Ohio House of Representatives from 2011 to 2016.

== Life and career ==
Terhar is a graduate of the United States Naval Academy, Syracuse University, and Harvard University. He is the managing director for Strategic Planning Advisors LLC. He also teaches in Xavier University's Executive MBA program and Mount St. Joseph University’s Saturday MBA program He is married to his wife, Debe, who is president of the State Board of Education of Ohio. They have four children and four grandchildren.

Prior to his time in public office, he served as president and chief executive officer of Integris Metals and The David J. Joseph Company.

In 2011, Terhar was appointed to the Ohio House of Representatives after incumbent Robert Mecklenborg resigned over a drink-driving incident. He was sworn in on September 14, 2011. Currently, he is serving on the committees of Economic and Small Business Development; Judiciary and Ethics; and State Government and Elections.

Terhar won his first full term to his seat in 2012, defeating Democrat Steven Newsome with 69.62% of the vote. He won a second term in 2014 with 74% of the vote.

== Ohio Senate ==
In 2016, Terhar announced he would seek the 8th district of the Ohio Senate to succeed Bill Seitz, who was prevented from running for re-election by term limits and in turn planned on running for Terhar's House seat. Facing no opposition for the Republican nomination, Terhar defeated Democrat Mary Lierman with 63% of the vote.

Terhar was sworn into office on January 3, 2017.

On September 3, 2019, Terhared announced that he was going to resign from office due to health issues.
