= Debe Terhar =

American politician

Debe Terhar is a US politician and member of the Republican Party. She served as president of the Ohio State Board of Education 2011-2014.

== Biography ==
=== Early life ===
Debe Terhar was born in Honolulu, Hawaii and has resided in California, Pennsylvania, New York, Massachusetts, Maryland, and England before moving to Ohio in 1989. She is a former Montessori teacher with experience in Early Childhood Montessori Education. Terhar served on the Cincinnati Montessori Society Board of Directors and on the Parent's Advisory Council of the Kelly O'Leary Center for Autism at Cincinnati Children's Hospital.

=== Personal ===
Terhar is a summa cum laude graduate of Xavier University and previously served as a board member on the Women of Excellence Council of Xavier's President's Advisory Council. She is a founding member of the American Spirit Education Alliance, a nonprofit organization dedicated to the preservation of American heritage.

She is a past president of the Hamilton County Republican Women's Club, a member of the Warren County Republican Women's Club, the Hamilton County Republican Club, The Green Township Republican Club and an early participant in the Tea Party movement. She is active in both the Northwest and Southwest Tea Parties of Hamilton County and the Lebanon Tea Party in Warren County.

=== Marriage and children ===
Debe Terhar is married to Louis Terhar, who served as a member of the Ohio House of Representatives from the 30th district and as a member of the Ohio Senate from the 8th District. They reside in the Cincinnati suburb of Monfort Heights. They have four children and six grandchildren.

=== Ohio State Board of Education ===
Terhar was elected to the Ohio State Board of Education in November 2010. Her term continues until December 2014. She was elected president of the state board in March 2011 with the support of Gov. John Kasich and reelected to the post in January 2013.

== Philosophical and/or political views ==
Terhar was active in the Tea Party movement.

=== Manufactured Hitler controversy ===
In January 2013, shortly after President Obama addressed the nation about gun control in the wake of the Sandy Hook Elementary School shooting, Terhar posted a graphic on her Facebook page with the caption "Never forget what this tyrant said: 'To conquer a nation, first disarm its citizens.' — Adolf Hitler." Terhar denied that she was comparing Obama to Hitler, but later stated that we "need to step back and think about it and look at history" to see that tyrants have disarmed their citizens.

=== Manufactured Book banning controversy ===
On September 10, 2013, Terhar made a statement at a State Board of Education meeting regarding the Toni Morrison novel The Bluest Eye, calling it "pornography". The book is on a suggested reading list for the Common Core State Standards Initiative. “I don’t want my grandchildren reading it and I don’t want anybody else’s grandchildren reading it,” she said. "It should not be used in any school for any Ohio K-12 child. If you want to use it in college somewhere, that’s fine." Terhar later stated that she supports Common Core in Ohio, and that she was not suggesting that the state ban the book. Many local and national media reported it as a book banning case, however. Since Terhar’s name is on the Ohio Board of Education’s website and that could be interpreted as an endorsement of the Suggested Reading List, she made it clear that each school district is responsible for the content of age appropriate books for their students and that the Suggested Reading List was adopted prior to her arrival on the State Board of Education.
