= The Bluest Eye =

1970 novel by Toni Morrison

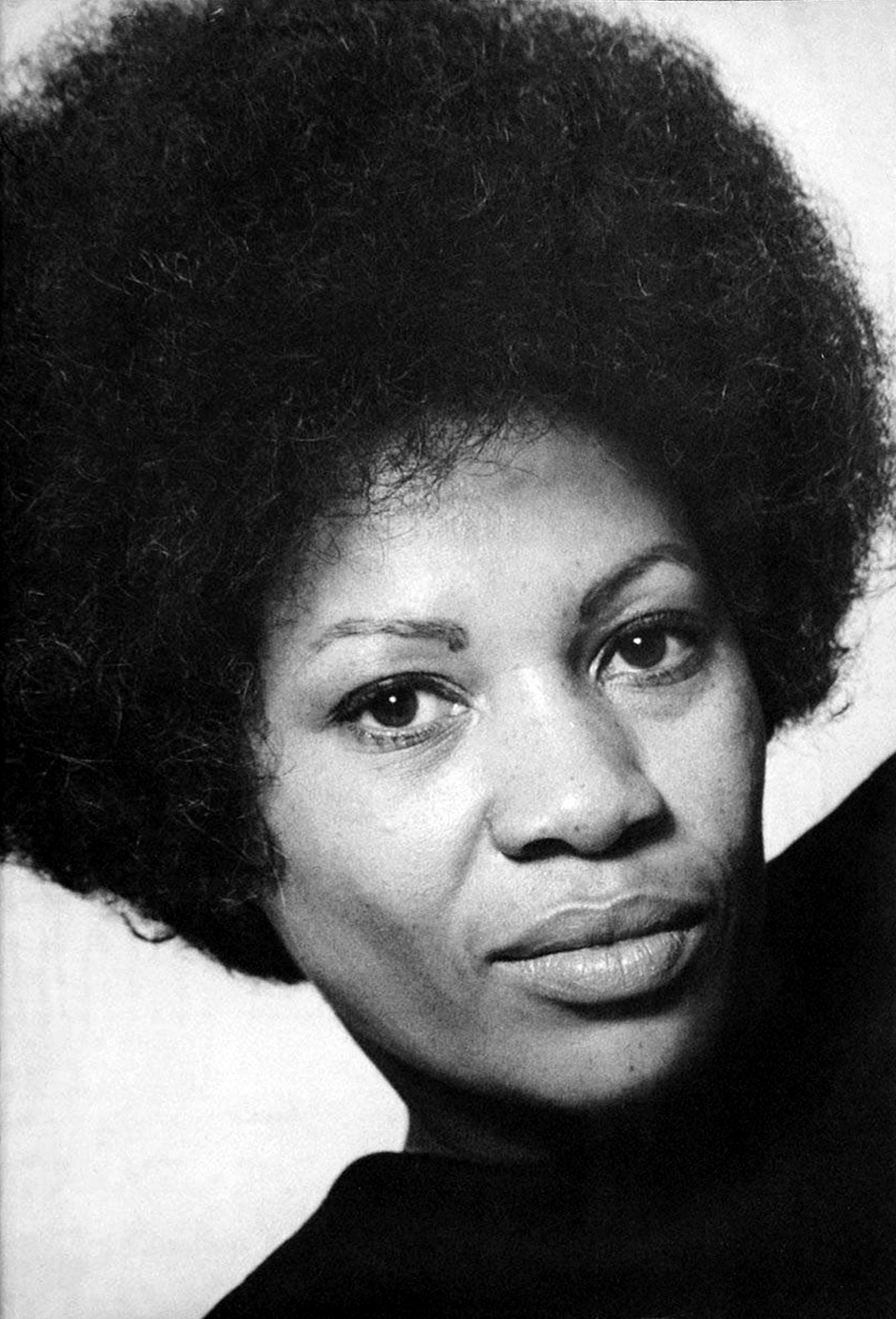
- Morrison's portrait on the first-edition dust jacket of The Bluest Eye (1970)
- Author: Toni Morrison
- Language: English
- Genre: American literature
- Publisher: Holt, Rinehart and Winston
- Publication date: 1970
- Publication place: United States
- Media type: Print (hardback & paperback)
- Pages: 224 pp (hardcover edition)
- ISBN: 978-0-375-41155-7 (hardcover edition)
- OCLC: 30110136
- Followed by: Sula

The Bluest Eye is the first novel written by American author Toni Morrison and published in 1970. It takes place in Lorain, Ohio (Morrison's hometown), and tells the story of a young African-American girl named Pecola who grew up following the Great Depression. She is consistently regarded as "ugly" due to her mannerisms and dark skin. As a result, she develops an inferiority complex, which fuels her desire for the blue eyes she equates with "whiteness".

The novel is told mostly from Claudia MacTeer's point of view. Claudia is the daughter of Pecola's temporary foster parents. There is also some omniscient third-person narration. The book's controversial topics of racism, incest, and child molestation have led to numerous attempts to ban the novel from schools and libraries in the United States.

== Plot summary ==
In 1941, in Lorain, Ohio, nine-year-old Claudia MacTeer and her ten-year-old sister Frieda live with their parents, a tenant named Mr. Henry Washington, and Pecola Breedlove, an 11-year-old temporary foster child whose house was burned down by her unstable, alcoholic, and sexually abusive father. Pecola is a quiet, passive girl who grows up with little money and whose parents are constantly fighting, both verbally and physically. Pecola is continually reminded of what an "ugly" girl she is by members of her neighborhood and school community. In an attempt to beautify herself, Pecola wishes for blue eyes. Additionally, most chapters' titles are extracts from the Dick and Jane paragraph in the novel's prologue, presenting a white family that may be contrasted with Pecola's. The chapter titles contain sudden repetition of words or phrases, many cut-off words, and no interword separations.

The novel, through flashbacks and various vignettes, explores the younger years of both of Pecola's parents, Cholly and Pauline, and their struggles as African Americans in a largely White Anglo-Saxon Protestant community. Cholly was abandoned by his parents at an early age and was raised by his aunt. His attempts to find his father led him to being spurned. Further humiliation came to him during his first sexual encounter, when two white men found him and made him continue even though he was paralyzed with fear at being discovered by the two men. He met Pauline at a young age, and they quickly wed, moving from Kentucky to Lorain. They initially loved each other, but their relationship gradually deteriorated over time, resulting in Cholly feeling trapped and uninterested. Pauline has a chronic, persistent belief that true, romantic love is reserved for beautiful people, and because she considers herself ugly, she encourages Cholly's behavior. Her belief that she is ugly greatly parallels Pecola's inferiority complex. Pauline now works as a servant for a wealthier white family, where she claims that she feels most alive.

At some point, Pecola leaves the MacTeers and returns to living with her parents. One day in the novel's present time, while Pecola is doing dishes at her home, a drunk Cholly finds her and rapes her. His motives are confusing, seemingly a combination of both love and hate. He leaves her to be discovered by Pauline, who does not believe Pecola's story and beats her. The community learns of Pecola's assault, and not long after, it is discovered that she is pregnant. Following the assault, a vignette depicts Pecola seeking the help of Soaphead Church, a cunning and deceptive man who pretends to be a spiritual healer. Pecola asks Soaphead to help her obtain blue eyes, and he tricks her into feeding a dog poisoned meat. When the dog dies, Pecola believes that her wish has been granted, and her mental state begins to sharply decline.

Claudia and Frieda are the only two in the community who hope for Pecola's child to survive in the coming months. Consequently, they give up the money they had been saving to buy a bicycle, instead planting marigold seeds with the superstitious belief that if the flowers bloom, Pecola's baby will survive. The marigolds never bloom, and Pecola's child, who is born prematurely, dies. In the aftermath, a dialogue is presented between two sides of Pecola's deluded imagination, in which she indicates conflicting feelings about her rape by her father. In this internal conversation, Pecola speaks as though her wish for blue eyes has been granted, and believes that the changed behavior of those around her is due to her new eyes, rather than the news of her rape or her increasingly strange behavior.

Claudia, as narrator a final time, describes the recent phenomenon of Pecola's insanity and suggests that Cholly, who died in a workhouse following the death of Pecola's baby, may have shown Pecola the only love he could by raping her. Claudia laments her belief that the whole community, herself included, has used Pecola as a scapegoat to make themselves feel prettier and happier.

== Characters ==
- Pecola Breedlove: Her insanity at the end of the novel is her only way to escape the world where she cannot be beautiful and happy due to her family situation and the beauty and social standards of that time. She believes that having blue eyes would make her more accepted.
- Claudia MacTeer: Narrates the majority of the novel and is also a young black girl. She is the child of Pecola's foster parents and is Frieda's sister. She is not only Pecola's fostering sister but she is also considered to be her friend. She is an independent, mature, and passionate nine-year-old. Despite her relative naivete, she is one of few, if any, characters that feel sympathy for Pecola. Claudia is the polar opposite of Pecola. In the first chapter, she destroys her white dolls out of hatred of white people. By contrast, Pecola consistently acts on her desire to achieve white beauty standards. Claudia is raised in a stable home, always assured of her self-worth and surrounded by a strong network of family.
- Frieda MacTeer: Claudia's ten-year-old sister. Frieda is more enlightened to the world in comparison to her younger sister and Pecola. Frieda is courageous and unwavering. She defends both Claudia and Pecola within the novel. Frieda is determined, independent, and stubborn at times.
- Mrs. MacTeer: Claudia and Frieda’s mother. Mrs. MacTeer offers her children tough love, administering corporal punishment and lecturing them on the cost of food. However, Mrs. MacTeer also cares deeply for her charges, looking after Claudia when she falls ill and helping Pecola when she gets her first period.
- Mr. Henry Washington: A boarder at the MacTeer house. Mr. Henry charms Claudia and Frieda by calling them “Ginger Rogers” and “Greta Garbo,” as well as doing magic tricks for them. Mr. Henry later gropes and attempts to molest Frieda, prompting Mr. MacTeer to chase him out of the house with a gun. Later in life, the girls say they still look back on their time with Mr. Henry fondly.
- Cholly Breedlove: Cholly is Pecola's father. Abusive and an alcoholic, Cholly's violent and aggressive behavior reflects his troublesome upbringing. In addition to being rejected by his father and discarded by his mother as a four-day-old baby, Cholly is scarred from an experience in his youth where he was coerced to have sex (with a girl he truly loved) for the amusement of two white men. Traumatic events like these influence Cholly to become a violent husband and father who beats his wife and eventually rapes his daughter. These acts are said to be mingled with affection, as Cholly is unable to separate his paternal affections from his own self-hatred and therefore cannot express love except through violence.
- Pauline "Polly" Breedlove: Pecola's mother, Mrs. Breedlove, is married to Cholly and lives the self-righteous life of a martyr, enduring her drunk husband and raising her two awkward children as well as she can. Mrs. Breedlove is a bit of an outcast herself with her shriveled foot and Southern background. She lives the life of a lonely and isolated character who escapes into a world of dreams, hopes, and fantasy that turns into the movies she enjoys viewing. However, after a traumatic event with a foul tooth, she relinquishes those dreams and escapes into her life as a housekeeper for a rich white family who gives her the beloved nickname "Polly".
- Sam Breedlove: Pecola's older brother. Sammy, as he is more often referred to in the novel, is Cholly and Mrs. Breedlove's only son. Sam's part in this novel is minimal. Like his sister Pecola, he is affected by the disharmony in their home and deals with his anger by running away.
- Auntie Jimmy: Cholly's great aunt, takes him in to raise him after his parents abandon him. She is friends with Miss Alice and is briefly ill, tended to by the medicine woman whom the locals call "M'Dear". Aunt Jimmy dies suddenly when Cholly is still a young boy during a meal of peach cobbler that was made by a friend, Esse Foster.
- Samson Fuller: Cholly Breedlove's father who abandoned Cholly before he was born. After Aunt Jimmy dies, Cholly runs off in search of Samson in Macon, Georgia, where he is left distraught and disappointed with his discovery.
- The Fishers: The rich, white couple who employ Pauline as their servant and as the caretaker of their young daughter.
- Geraldine: A socially conscious upper-class black woman in the community who exaggerates the fact that she is above traditional black stereotypes and is more "civilized" than other black families in Lorain, Ohio. When she feels that her husband isn't fulfilling her need for love, she finds a cat and pours her affection into it. Her lack of attention to anything but the cat causes unintended hatred for the cat from her son, whom she often neglects.
- Louis Junior: Geraldine's son, who bullies Pecola and blames her for accidentally killing his mother's beloved cat.
- Maginot Line (Marie): A prostitute who lives with two other prostitutes named China and Poland in an apartment above the one Pecola lives in. These ladies are ostracized by society, but teach Pecola a lot about being a social outcast, and offer her the support that few others do.
- Rosemary Villanucci: The MacTeers' next-door neighbor who constantly tries to get Claudia and Frieda in trouble.
- Mr. Yacobowski: The discriminatory white immigrant, owner of the grocery store where Pecola goes to buy Mary Janes.
- Maureen Peal: A light-skinned, green-eyed multiracial African-American girl of Pecola's age who is described in the book as a "high yellow dream child" with long brown hair and green eyes. Maureen considers herself to be above dark-skinned African-American people. Frieda and Claudia mock Maureen, calling her "Meringue Pie".
- Soaphead Church: Born Elihue Whitcomb, he received his nickname, "Soaphead Church", for his hair and profession, and has proclaimed himself to be "Reader, Adviser, and Interpreter of Dreams". He is a "light-skinned" West Indian failed preacher who hates all kinds of human touch. He considers himself to be a "misanthrope". He refuses to confront his homosexuality and therefore, the touch of little girls whom he views as innocent and "seductive" is the cleanest form of human touch that he pursues. He is also a religious hypocrite as a past preacher. Although someone who hates humans, as a "Reader, Adviser, and Interpreter of Dreams", he takes on the trouble of others, and works closely with them to help solve their problems. When Pecola approaches him asking for blue eyes, he tells her to give meat to his landlord's dog, and that her wish will be granted if the dog reacts. However, he secretly poisons the meat, and the dog dies, contributing to Pecola's delusions that she has blue eyes.

== Author's intentions ==
When asked about her motivations for writing The Bluest Eye in an interview, Morrison stated that she wanted to remind readers "how hurtful racism is" and that people are "apologetic about the fact that their skin [is] so dark". Reminiscing about her own experience, she recalled: "When I was a kid, we called each other names but we didn't think it was serious, that you could take it in." Expanding on this point of self-esteem, Morrison elaborated that she "wanted to speak on behalf of those who didn't catch that [they were beautiful] right away. [She] was deeply concerned about the feelings of ugliness." As seen throughout The Bluest Eye, this idea of "ugliness" is conveyed through a variety of characters. For example, Pecola, the main character, wishes for blue eyes as a way to escape the oppression that results from her having dark skin. Through Pecola's characterization, Morrison seeks to demonstrate the negative impact racism can have on one's self-confidence and worth. As she concluded in her interview, she "wanted people to understand what it was like to be treated that way".

Morrison commented on her motivations to write the novel, saying, "I felt compelled to write this mostly because in the 1960s, black male authors published powerful, aggressive, revolutionary fiction or nonfiction, and they had positive racially uplifting rhetoric with them that were stimulating and I thought they would skip over something and thought no one would remember that it wasn't always beautiful."

== Analysis ==
=== Black girlhood ===
Morrison's writing of the book began because she was "interested in talking about black girlhood". Jan Furman, professor of English at the University of Michigan, notes that the book allows the reader to analyze the "imprinting" factors that shape the identity of the self during the process of maturing in young black girls. She references parts in the book where the main characters are taught to feel less than human, specifically when the shopkeeper avoids touching Pecola's hand when giving her candy.

Susmita Roye, an associate professor of English at Delaware State University, notes that the novel emphasizes that living in a world defined by Euro-centric beauty standards creates a longing for whiteness, such as Pecola's desire for blue eyes, which attacks young black girls' confidence and perceived beauty. References to Shirley Temple and Dick and Jane serve similarly.

=== White lifestyle standards ===
The "Dick and Jane" textbooks (called Elson Basic Readers) were popular primers in the mid-20th century, and Morrison refers to them in The Bluest Eye by including her own versions of the "Dick and Jane" stories at the beginning of multiple chapters. These "Dick and Jane" stories promoted the importance of the white nuclear family as a way of helping foster literacy in young children. Morrison presents a critical view of the textbook's family by contrasting the "Dick and Jane" family with the MacTeers and Breedloves. Morrison's storytelling in The Bluest Eye challenged existing attitudes that stigmatized talking about sexual violence in children's lives. The living standards presented in the "Dick and Jane" stories were unachievable for many poor Black children who shared backgrounds with Pecola.

Debra Werrlein, professor at George Mason University, contends that the excerpts of "Dick and Jane" throughout the book project an image of an ideal family that contrasts with the family structures of the main characters. She argues that because the novel takes place in a time of World War II social sentiments, the "Dick and Jane" primer emphasizes the importance of raising children so as to mold the future of the United States. However, as Werrlein points out, the whiteness of the "Dick and Jane" characters represented the ideal American family. In addition, the string of letters describing Dick and Jane's perfect parents as strong and kind are used to create a contrast with Pecola's parents in the novel. Pecola's father is thus emasculated, Werrlein argues, because his behavior deviates from this standard for American family life. Finally, Werrlein claims that the black parents have experienced oppression throughout their lives, and that same oppression has negatively influenced their familial structure. Thus, racism is a prevalent factor in their homes.

English Professor Philip Page focuses on the importance of duality in The Bluest Eye. He claims that Morrison presents an "inverted world", entirely opposite from the Dick and Jane story that is at the beginning of the novel. The idea of breaks and splitting is common, as seen in the context of the war occurring in the time period of the story, the split nature of Pecola's family, and the watermelon that Cholly observes break open during a flashback. Page argues that breaks symbolize the challenges of African-American life, as seen in the rip in the Breedloves' couch that symbolizes poverty, or the break in Pauline's tooth that ruins her marriage and family. He goes on to identify how each of the characters are broken personally, since Cholly's former and present lives are described as chaotic and jumbled, and Pauline is responsible for both her biological family and the white family she works for. The epitome of this, Page argues, is seen in Pecola at the end of the novel. The events of her life, having broken parents in a broken family, have resulted in a totally fractured personality, which drives Pecola into madness.

=== Internalized racism ===
In the article "Racism and Appearance in The Bluest Eye: A Template for an Ethical Emotive Criticism", Jerome Bump explains how the novel suggests that physical beauty is a virtue embedded in society. Bump asserts that the novel reveals the belief that the outside of people ultimately reflects their character and personality. This belief compromises people's judgement and they act upon internal bias. These biases are displayed throughout the novel, especially through the mistreatment of Pecola by family, friends and community.

Literary critic Lynn Scott argues that the constant images of whiteness in The Bluest Eye serve to represent society's perception of beauty, which ultimately proves to have destructive consequences for many of the characters in the novel. Scott explains that in the novel, superiority, power, and virtue are associated with beauty, which is inherent in whiteness. She further asserts that white beauty standards are perpetuated by visual images in the media as well as the attitude of Pecola's family. When Pauline first arrives in Lorain, she feels pressure to conform and begins to develop a construct of femininity based on the actresses such as Jean Harlow. Pecola is also surrounded by constant images that perpetuate white beauty standards, including references to Shirley Temple and an image of Mary Jane that appears on her candy wrappers. Scott believes that Pecola attempts to seek the power associated with whiteness, and in her attempt to conform, she develops a destructive desire for blue eyes.

Harihar Kulkarni, an author of a book on African-American feminist fiction literature, recognizes that these Euro-centric ideals of family and beauty present in The Bluest Eye are shown to be transferred generationally, often between female relationships. In addition to living in a white-dominant society, this intergenerational oppression manifests itself into shame and self-hatred as demonstrated through Pecola's character development.

In the article "Probing Racial Dilemmas in the Bluest Eye with the Spyglass of Psychology", Anna Zebialowicz and Marek Palasinski discuss the racial climate of the society set forth in the novel. Zebialowicz and Palasinski explain how Pecola struggles with her identity as a black girl: "Ethnic identity and gender dilemmas are still both anecdotally and empirically linked to a decrease in self-esteem, adaptiveness and well-being". Pecola's race and gender both work against her to create a complex form of oppression. Morrison's novel confronts self-hatred and destructive behaviors black women participate in to fit into the hegemonic image of beauty and whiteness.

=== Religion ===
Critic Allen Alexander argues that religion is an important theme in The Bluest Eye, since Morrison's work possesses a "fourth face" outside of the Christian Trinity, which represents "the existence of evil, the suffering of the innocent". Alexander claims Pecola's suffering stems from her attempts to rationalize her misfortune with the notion of an omnipotent God. He further argues that much of Pecola's story suggests the insufficiency of Christian beliefs for minorities who exist in a predominantly white society. This ideology damages Pecola and her mother, Pauline, who fully accepts Christianity and spends her time caring for a white family as opposed to her own. Alexander suggests that the image of a more human God represents a traditional African view of deities, better suiting the lives of the African-American characters.

=== Media and culture ===
In the essays "Disconnections from the Motherline: Gender Hegemonies and the Loss of the Ancient Properties; The Bluest Eye, Song of Solomon, Tar Baby" and "Maternal Interventions: Resistance and Power; The Bluest Eye, Sula, Song of Solomon, Tar Baby, Beloved, Paradise", Andrea O'Reilly, a women's studies professor, proclaims that African-American women pass on cultural knowledge to successive generations through the process of motherline: "the ancestral memory and ancient properties of traditional black culture". O'Reilly claims that The Bluest Eye portrays how attempting to assimilate to white American ideologies effectively undermines the motherline process for African-American women.

Professor of English Jane Kuenz shows that Pecola conforms to what white society expects of her, as her affinity for Shirley Temple and other manifestations of whiteness illustrates the influence of the power of mass media. Kuenz insists that The Bluest Eye demonstrates the impact of mass-produced images in a hegemonic society. Kuenz specifically underscores the role the film industry plays in constructing these images, pointing out the influence of the cinema on various characters in the novel. Pauline Breedlove first feels ugly when she cannot make herself look like Jean Harlow, a white actress and sex symbol. Mr. Henry gives Claudia and Frieda the nicknames “Ginger Rogers” and "Greta Garbo,” two other white actresses with sexual personas. Maureen Peal also informs Pecola that she is named after a character in the 1934 film Imitation of Life. (The character in the film, actually named Peola, is a light-skinned young woman who resents her mother for being Black.) In each instance, the characters of the novel struggle with their inability to conform to the white beauty standards glorified by Hollywood.

Furthermore, the inclusion of the Shirley Temple cup in the novel highlights the commodification of childhood innocence alongside white beauty standards. While this cup acts as a symbolic representation of Pecola’s internalized dislike of her identity and desire to become “beautiful,” it simultaneously represents an era of media that was designed around marketing the ideal of “white beauty”. Moreover, the Shirley Temple cup is a representation of what was considered beautiful enough to put on a product that was intended to make a profit. In addition, this cup was designed to commodify and exemplify the juvenile innocence and adorable face of Shirley Temple, while simultaneously and implicitly excluding all features that do not fit within the guidelines of this constructed image. Therefore equating this beauty standard with the purity associated with it, thus excluding Pecola.

=== Violence ===
In the article "Treatment of Violence: A Study of Morrison's the Bluest Eye and Beloved", Shubhanku Kochar, a professor of English in India, argues that the theme of violence in the Bluest Eye is not discussed enough. Kochar asserts that the powerful white characters psychologically abuse people of non-white cultures and races, which results in a dominant theme of violence in the novel. She adds that psychoanalytical study focuses on these race-based tensions that consistently cause emotional harm. The Marxist frame targets class relations, while the feminist lens centers on violence perpetrated against women. Kochar argues that to comprehend the complex violence inflicted on Pecola, one must analyze the novel through the Marxist and Feminist lens in addition to the psychoanalytical lens.

=== Shame ===
J. Brooks Bouson, an English professor at Loyola University Chicago, claims that The Bluest Eye is a "shame drama and trauma narrative", that uses Pecola and its other characters to examine how people respond to shame. Bouson argues that some characters, like Claudia, show how people can respond violently to shame: Claudia does this by rejecting the racist system she lives in and destroying the white dolls she is given. However, most characters in the novel pass on their shame to someone below them on the social and racial ladder. For example, Soaphead Church comes from a family obsessed with lightening their skin tone, and passes on the shame of his African-American heritage by molesting young girls. Bouson suggests that all of the African-American characters in The Bluest Eye exhibit shame, and eventually much of this shame is passed onto Pecola, who is at the bottom of the racial and social ladder.

== Genre and style ==
Toni Morrison's novel The Bluest Eye breaks the long tradition of narratives that discuss the hardships of war and depression in the 1940s, and according to University of Oxford professor Tessa Roynon, who studies African-American literature, she brings forth a unique and untold point of view in American historical fiction. Roynon argues that Morrison purposefully writes stories that defy the "American mainstream ideology" by focusing in on the realities of African-American life at the time. Critics like Abdellatif Khayati, professor at the Moroccan Cultural Studies Center, and librarian Sandra Hughes-Hassel argue that The Bluest Eye serves as a counter-narrative, a method of the telling the accounts of people whose stories are rarely told and deliberately hidden. In an interview, Morrison stated: "my job becomes how to rip that veil drawn over proceedings too terrible to relate. The exercise is also critical for any person who is black, or who belongs to any marginalized category, for, historically, we were seldom invited to participate in the discourse even when we were its topic." In this novel, Morrison depicts a protagonist, Pecola, a young black girl who is a victim of this perpetual racism and denial that Morrison discusses.

As the Civil Rights Movement began to decline in favor of conservative ideals and white power, American culture soon fostered a national identity that excluded anyone who was not white, according to English professor Catherine Romagnolo. One example of this is that historically racist ideologies influence the character Soaphead Church in the novel, as University of Oxford professor Tessa Roynon, who studies African-American literature, explains: "the racial theories of Hume, Kant, Jefferson, and others, derived from innovations in classificatory systems by scientists such as Linnaeus, have been collected in useful readers such as Emmanuel Chukwudi Eze's anthology Race and the Enlightenment (1997). The well-read, race-obsessed Soaphead Church in The Bluest Eye is the inevitable product of these theories." As Khayati explains, these perpetual racist beliefs shape Pecola's self destructiveness, and she is suspicious of even her own blackness, and desires the characteristics of a white person, like those in the Dick and Jane primers. Khayati says The Bluest Eye shows how the historic white narrative creates an "epistemic violence of the Other [which] operates through the internalization of the self-as-other. Pecola exists only in the image reflected by the Other." Romagnolo argues that just as Pecola's rape is concealed throughout the story, the novel exposes a history of failed pursuits of hiding the racist and sexist establishments that directly provoke each character's hardships.

While Morrison was a notable female writer, she was quick to deny her works being categorized as "feminist", as she believed the title denies the specific necessities of black women. Rather than depict strong female protagonists, Morrison created characters who are actually defeated by the racism and sexism of the historic time period. Anne Salvatore, a professor of English at Rider University, interprets this failure of the "anti heroine" as a stark contrast to the typical bildungsroman, where a male character defeats obstacles and grows from experience. Instead, in The Bluest Eye, Pecola fails to develop an individual identity in the face of an oppressive society, and her self-hatred forces her to retreat from reality completely.

The points of view in the novel reveal a multi-perspectival post-1945 style. According to Roynon, Morrison combines three narrators: two revealing Claudia MacTeer—one is a child narrator and one is an adult narrator looking back on childhood—and one omniscient third-person narrator who connects the many tragedies of the characters. By the end of the novel, the jumbled words of the Dick and Jane primer, as well as the increasingly confusing chapters, hint at Pecola's descent into madness. Roynon suggests this breakdown in the novel's structure represents a destruction of the harmful ideologies which Morrison's stories seeks to reject.

== Reception ==
The novel received minimal critical attention when first published; however, it was placed on many university reading lists in black-studies departments, which promoted further recognition. Morrison was praised for her handling of difficult themes: critic Haskel Frankel said, "Given a scene that demands a writer's best, Morrison responds with control and talent." The first major sign that the book would succeed was an extremely positive review in The New York Times in November 1970. Morrison was also positively reviewed for her break from the status quo of usual novels from the time period, writing to a wider audience and focusing on black subculture in the 1940s, rather than the military culture of the time. African-American critic Ruby Dee wrote: "Toni Morrison has not written a story really, but a series of painfully accurate impressions." Morrison was additionally praised for her wide coverage of emotion in the novel, extending from Pecola Breedlove's quiet descent into madness, to Cholly Breedlove's skewed mindsets.

Critics picked up on Morrison's shortcomings as a first time published author. A common critique of her writing included her language in the novel, as it was often viewed as being made too simple for the reader. Early critics were also ambivalent about Morrison's portrayal of the black woman as an object in society rather than a person, only ever going so far as to bring this fact to light and rarely commenting past it. The most in-depth analysis of the novel began with feminist critique. There were also notable differences between African-American critics (who often identified more with the characters of the novel) and Euro-American critics (who often only focused on the actual writing of the novel).

Within classrooms across the country, educators also disagreed over whether or not the novel was appropriate for children. One African-American educator, founder of the IFE Academy of Teaching & Technology Shekema Silveri, has stated: "Teaching novels like The Bluest Eye helps us break down barriers with students. After reading the book, I had a student who said that she is the product of incest. And I've had a student who said that she was molested by her uncle. Books allow us to help them heal in ways that we as educators couldn't help them heal on our own." In an interview, American Library Association (ALA) editor Robert P. Doyle also recognized the potential of novels like The Bluest Eye to effect positive change within schools, stating that, "The book community realized that [they] have not only an opportunity, but a responsibility to engage the American public in a conversation about the First Amendment as it relates to books and literature." The Bluest Eye is one of many novels on the ALA's lists of challenged books, appearing as 15th out of 100 of the most challenged novels in the most recent decade.

As time passed, more reviews and analyses were written in praise of Morrison's writing of the "colonization of the mind", her critique of white versus black beauty standards, and even began to analyze her use of simplistic language, calling it a stylistic choice rather than a pitfall of the novel. Despite initial controversies surrounding the subject matter of The Bluest Eye, Morrison was eventually recognized for her contributions to literature when she received the Nobel Prize in 1993, more than 20 years following the original publication of the novel.

== Book-banning controversies ==
The Bluest Eye has frequently landed on American Library Association's (ALA) list of most challenged books because it contains offensive language, sexually explicit material, and controversial issues, as well as depicting child sexual abuse and being "unsuited to the age group". The ALA placed it on the Top Ten Most Challenged Books Lists for 2006 (5), 2014 (4), 2013 (2), 2020 (9), and 2022 (3). Ultimately, it became the 34th-most banned book in the United States 1990–1999, the 15th-most banned book 2000–2009, and the 10th-most banned book 2010–2019.

=== Montgomery County, Maryland ===
The Bluest Eye was legally challenged on February 10, 1998, by a mother from Montgomery County, Maryland, named Christine Schwalm. She brought The Bluest Eye and four other books to the attention of the Montgomery County school board, describing The Bluest Eye and others as "lewd, adult books". Ms. Schwalm argued for the removal of the book from the syllabus because she deemed them to be "at odds with the character education programme" promoted within the schools. In court, Ms Schwalm read a passage specifically from The Bluest Eye in order to demonstrate the inappropriate nature of the content within the novel. The passage in question featured Soaphead Church and presented pedophelia and child molestation, leading to Schwalm's objections to its presence in schools. The book, however, was not removed from the curriculum as Schwalm's objections were not upheld in court.

=== Baker City, Oregon ===
In March 1999, The Bluest Eye was successfully banned from Baker High School language arts program in Baker City, Oregon, after multiple complaints from parents about the content of the book. The original source of contention for this novel was the rape scene between Cholly and Pecola. Later, the book was banned for being "sexually explicit", "unsuited for age group", and containing "controversial issues". The decision was made by Baker City schools superintendent Arnold Coe, and was supported by the school board.

=== Claremont, New Hampshire ===
In 1999, parents of students at Stevens High School in Claremont, New Hampshire, objected to the book's being assigned to lower grade levels. The case started when parents complained to the school that they thought the book contained content that was sexually inappropriate for children. As a result, the school decided to remove the book from freshmen and sophomore reading lists, and deemed that the novel was only "suitable" for juniors and seniors. In addition, the school also ruled that teachers must send reading lists to parents early on in the year to get their approval as to which books their children could read and discuss in class. While some parents would have preferred heavier restrictions against the book at Stevens High School, they were glad that action was taken, as they viewed The Bluest Eye to be an "adult book".

=== Littleton, Colorado ===
In August 2005 in Littleton, Colorado, the Littleton school board voted to ban The Bluest Eye from reading lists, where it was listed as optional, and remove it from the libraries of the Heritage and Arapahoe high schools, despite the recommendation of a committee that the book be restricted to juniors and seniors. The ban was enacted in response to a complaint received by a parent of a ninth-grader student who was on the board and who took issue with the novel's sexual content, specifically the scene of Pecola's rape. Students protested the ban by reading passages from the book in their school libraries. In response to the ban, Camille Okoren, a student attending the sit-in acknowledged "students hear about rape and incest in the news media. It's better to learn about those subjects from a Nobel Prize winner ... and to discuss it with a teacher in class." Ultimately, the book was reinstated after English teacher Judy Vlasin filed an application to the board explaining why it should not be banned.

=== Howell, Michigan ===
In February 2007, a group called LOVE (the Livingston Organization for Values in Education) challenged four books in the Howell High School curriculum, including The Bluest Eye, Black Boy by Richard Wright, Slaughterhouse Five by Kurt Vonnegut, and The Freedom Writers Diary. The National Coalition Against Censorship published a letter in response to the criticism, claiming that the scenes which involve sex "represent small but essential parts of the novels, consistent with the kind of material that high school students frequently read." Their letter also argued that the books in question "are widely recognized as works of significant literary and artistic merit", and "are widely taught in high schools and colleges around the country".

Despite controversy, the curriculum was in fact approved in a 5-to-2 decision by the Howell School Board. In response to the legal concerns raised by LOVE, Livingston Prosecutor David Morse, the Michigan Attorney General Mike Cox, and the U.S. Attorney confirmed that no laws, state or federal, had been broken by including the selected books in the curriculum. Since the case, the books have been included in 11th grade advanced English curriculum.

=== Adams County, Colorado ===
In 2013, a group of parents challenged The Bluest Eye's inclusion in Legacy High School's AP English curriculum due to the book's sexual content and "subject matter" of a girl getting raped by her father. In their petition launched through Change.org, the parents argued that they "did not want developmentally inappropriate and graphic books used for classroom instruction". In a formal petition submitted to the superintendent, parent Janela Karlson claimed the introduction of sexually graphic material including rape and incest could be developmentally harmful to minors as supported by scientific research.

In response to the challenge, Legacy High School student Bailey Cross created a petition to maintain the book in the curriculum, and expressed the importance of retaining the book because "Banning and censoring this tells students that ... racism, incest, rape, abuse, are taboo subjects that should not be mentioned." Numerous teachers also spoke out against the ban, stating that the book was used to analyze Morrison's writing style and that banning it could set a precedent for censorship in the district. Ultimately, the Adams County School Board voted to retain the Superintendent's original ruling of the 2010 challenge, which not only restricted the book to AP curriculum but also required teachers to notify parents before their child read the book.

=== Ohio ===
In September 2013, The Bluest Eye was challenged by the Ohio Board of Education President Debe Terhar. This book was listed as recommended reading in the state's Common Core standards, but was challenged at the state's Board of Education, with teachers pushing to ban it from the classroom due to its explicit content. Terhar took particular issue when it came to the scene regarding Pecola being raped by her father. Although not seen commenting on previous challenges to her books, Morrison specifically commented on this particular incident: "I mean if it's Texas or North Carolina as it has been in all sorts of states. But to be a girl from Ohio, writing about Ohio having been born in Lorain, Ohio. And actually relating as an Ohio person, to have the Ohio, what—Board of Education?—is ironic at the least".

Debe Terhar, State Board of Education President and Cincinnati Republican, called the novel "pornographic" and suggested the book be removed from the state's teaching guidelines. Mark Smith, Ohio Christian University president, said, "I see an underlying socialist-communist agenda ... that is anti what this nation is about." The American Civil Liberties Union wrote a letter to Ms. Terhar, explaining the book was "a bold, unflinching look at the pain and damage that internalized racism can inflict on a young girl and her community". Despite the publicity, The Bluest Eye remained on the recommended reading list.

=== Wake County, North Carolina ===
In July 2014, East Wake High School in North Carolina removed The Bluest Eye from their reading lists due to what was deemed inappropriate content. In particular, the school highlighted the fact that the book contains "a description of a father raping his daughter". Furthermore, East Wake High assigned an alternative book to their reading list, The Color Purple. The Bluest Eye, however, was still left available within their libraries for students to read if they wish at their own discretion, as the school wished to make clear that they were not "denying students access to that level of literature".

=== Northville, Michigan ===
In 2016, The Bluest Eye was challenged in the Northville, Michigan, school district after a parent filed a complaint petitioning for the removal of the book from the AP Literature and Composition curriculum, stating the book's portrayal of sexual assault was not age-appropriate. A committee, consisting of a school administrator and other educators, evaluated the book and recommended that the board vote to maintain the book in the AP curriculum and allow students the option to choose an alternative book. The committee announced their decision explaining that removing the book "would eliminate the opportunity for deep study by our student[s] on critical themes in our society". Despite some support for the ban, many parents and students objected to it, with one student stating, "The purpose of AP literature as a class is to expand our understanding and enlarge our world, not make us more comfortable inside boxes of ignorance." Parents and students opposed to the ban were also supported by national organizations including the National Council of Teachers of English, NCAC, and ALA. After voting, the board ultimately sided with the evaluation of the committee and retained the book in the AP curriculum.

=== Buncombe County, North Carolina ===
In September 2017, The Bluest Eye was challenged at North Buncombe High School in Buncombe County, North Carolina, by a parent, Tim Coley. Tim Coley, a self-described "Christian single dad", took notice of the book for its sexual content and formed a committee concerning the removal of the book in the English honors academics. Coley told WLOS-13 "It's astounding really that somebody thinks it's OK for kids to be reading this in school." Eric Grant, the English coordinator, defended the book by making the committee aware that the school offered an alternative assignment for those who were not comfortable with the book. He also mentioned that the book was in the syllabus that was handed out at the beginning of the year. The committee was given time to read the book and determine if there was academic value offered from the book.

=== Wentzville, Missouri ===
In January 2022, the Wentzville, Missouri, school board voted 4–3 to ban The Bluest Eye, going against the review committee's 8–1 vote to retain the book in the district's libraries. The ban included three other books, as well: George M. Johnson's All Boys Aren't Blue, Alison Bechdel's Fun Home, and Kiese Laymon's Heavy.

=== Wasilla, Alaska ===
In September 2023, The Bluest Eye was challenged, along with 55 other books, by a newly created District Wide Library Committee, in the Matanuska-Susitna Borough School District, Alaska. This advisory committee was created and individual members selected by current Matanuska-Susitna Borough School District School Board members, in a change from the district's standard operating procedures. The committee was tasked with seeking out specific titles on a list, as well as finding additional book titles for banning. The committee incorrectly identified Toni Morrison's prize-winning book, along with others, as violating a state statute for distributing “indecent material” that is “harmful to minors” age 16 and under. A lawsuit by the ACLU of Alaska successfully returned The Bluest Eye and the other 55 challenged books and forced the District to pay $89,000 in damages.

=== Katy, Texas ===
In 2024, the book was banned in Texas by the Katy Independent School District on the basis that the novel is "adopting, supporting, or promoting gender fluidity" despite also pronouncing a bullying policy that protects infringements on the rights of the student.

== Adaptations ==
An adaptation of The Bluest Eye by Lydia R. Diamond was first performed in Chicago, Illinois in 2005, before seeing further adaptations around the United States.

- The Steppenwolf Theatre Company in Chicago, Illinois commissioned Lydia R. Diamond to adapt the novel into a full-length stage production. This play was developed through the Steppenwolf for Young Adults and the New Plays Initiative, where it received its world premiere in February 2005. The play was reprised in Chicago at the Steppenwolf Theatre in October 2006. The Bluest Eye received its off-Broadway premiere at the New Victory Theater in New York in November, 2006.
- In 2010, Phantom Projects Educational Theatre Group presented the Lydia R. Diamond adaptation at the La Mirada Theatre for the Performing Arts in La Mirada, California.
- Rapper Talib Kweli used the book as an inspiration for his song "Thieves in the Night" with Mos Def on the Blackstar album.
- In 2017, the Guthrie Theatre presented a production of The Bluest Eye, produced and adapted by Lydia R. Diamond, and directed by Lileana Blain-Cruz. This production is said to give the book "a poetic staging", staging the entire play in one act. The adapted script presents the abuse in a stylized form. The production was critically appraised, with the role of Pecola being particularly celebrated.

== Bibliography ==
- Enright, Anne. "Eyes that Bite" London Review of Books Vol. 45 No. 1 January 2023.
- "Censorship Dateline: Schools". Newsletter on Intellectual Freedom 62.5 (2013): 184–85.
- "English in the News". The English Journal, vol. 89, no. 4, 2000, pp. 113–117.
- Foerstel, Herbert N. Banned in the U.S.A.: A Reference Guide to Book Censorship in Schools and Public Libraries. Westport, US: Greenwood Press, 2002.
- "In Broomfield, CO 'Bluest Eye' Is Removed Without Being 'Banned'". National Coalition Against Censorship. August 23, 2013.
- Kochar, Shubhanku. "Treatment Of Violence: A Study Of Morrison's The Bluest Eye And Beloved". Language In India 13.1 (2013): 532–622. Master's Degree Dissertation.http://www.languageinindia.com/jan2013/shubhankumphildissertation2.pdf.
- Mcdowell, Margaret B. (2005). "Morrison, Toni b. 18 February 1931, Lorain, Ohio" ( (PDF)). In Bendixen, Alfred (ed.). Continuum Encyclopedia of American Literature (1 ed.). London, UK: Continuum. ISBN 9780826415172. Archived from the original on June 16, 2022 – via Credo Reference.
- Morrison, Toni. The Bluest Eye. New York: Knopf, 2000.
- Morrison, Toni. "Toni Morrison Talks About Her Motivation For Writing". via YouTube. National Visionary Leadership Project, 2008.
- "Toni Morrison – Biographical". Nobelprize.org. Nobel Media AB 2014.
- "Schools Limit Readership Of Book By Nobel Winner". Orlando Sentinel. June 18, 1999.
- Werrlein, Debra T. "Not so Fast, Dick and Jane: Reimagining Childhood and Nation in the Bluest Eye". MELUS 30.4 (2005): 53–72. JSTOR 30029634.
- Bump, Jeromo. "Family Systems Therapy and Narrative" in Womack, Kenneth and Knapp, John Newark (eds), Reading the Family Dance: Family Systems Therapy and Literature Study. Newark: UP, 2003. pp. 151–170
- Lucky, Crystal J. "Ancestral Wisdom in Toni Morrison's The Bluest Eye". Proteus: A Journal of Ideas 21.2 (2004): 21–26.
- Waxman, Barbara Frey. "Girls Into Women: Culture, Nature, and Self-Loathing" in Fisher, Jerilyn and Silbert, Ellen S. (eds), Women in Literature: Reading Through the Lens of Gender, Westport: Greenwood, 2003. pp. 47–49.

== See also ==
- Doll experiments
