= Patty Clancy =

American politician

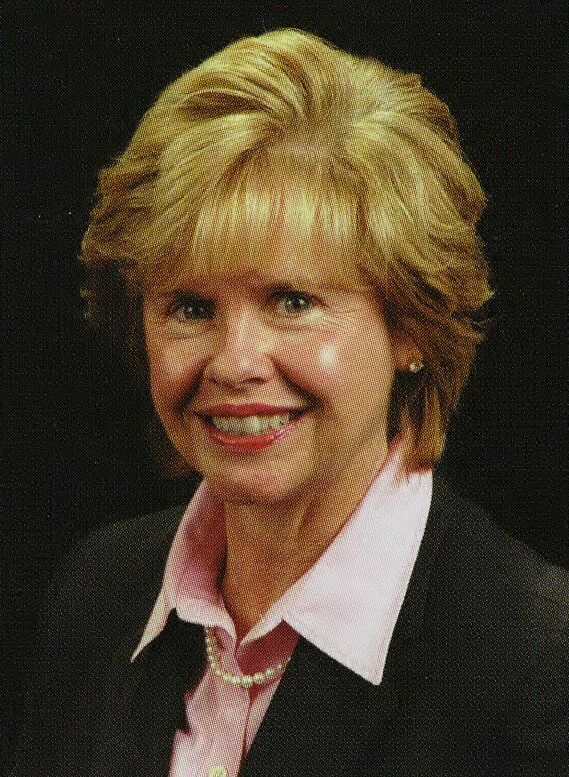

Member of the Ohio Senate from the 8th district
- In office January 3, 2005 – October 9, 2007
- Preceded by: Lou Blessing
- Succeeded by: Bill Seitz

Member of the Ohio House of Representatives from the 29th district
- In office January 3, 1997 – December 31, 2004
- Preceded by: Lou Blessing
- Succeeded by: Lou Blessing

Personal details
- Party: Republican

Patricia M. Clancy is a former Republican member of the Ohio General Assembly, representing the 8th District from 2005 to 2007. She is the daughter of former Cincinnati Mayor and U.S. Congressman Donald D. Clancy. Clancy first ran for the Ohio House of Representatives in 1996, after Representative Lou Blessing opted to run for the Ohio Senate. She won, and was reelected in 1998 and 2000. For the 124th Ohio General Assembly, Clancy was named as majority leader of the House. She won a final term in the House 2002, before facing term limits.

By 2004, Clancy had served four two-year terms in the Ohio House of Representatives and was prevented by Ohio's term limits law from running for re-election again. At the same time, another Cincinnati-area politician, Republican state Sen. Louis W. Blessing Jr., had also run up against term limits. So, Blessing and Clancy ran for each other's seats, both succeeding and holding the seats for the Republican party. Clancy defeated the Democratic nominee, real estate agent Jeannette Harrison.

Halfway through her first term in the Senate, Clancy sought and received an appointment as the assistant chief probation officer for the Hamilton County Common Pleas Court. As a result, she resigned her Senate seat on October 9, 2007. In 2008, she was elected Hamilton County Clerk of Court.
