= Louis Blessing =

American politician (born 1980)

Louis W. Blessing III

Member of the Ohio Senate from the 8th district
- Incumbent
- Assumed office October 9, 2019
- Preceded by: Louis Terhar

Member of the Ohio House of Representatives from the 29th district
- In office January 7, 2013 – October 8, 2019
- Preceded by: Lou Blessing
- Succeeded by: Cindy Abrams

Chairman Government Accountability and Oversight
- In office September 22, 2016 – December 31, 2018
- Preceded by: Tim Brown

Chairman Primary and Secondary Education
- In office February 8, 2019 – October 8, 2019
- Preceded by: Andrew Brenner

Personal details
- Born: November 11, 1980 (age 45) Cincinnati, Ohio, U.S.
- Party: Republican
- Spouse: Heather Mann (m. 2015)
- Children: 2
- Education: University of Cincinnati
- Profession: Electrical engineer
- Nickname: Bill

Louis W. Blessing III (born November 11, 1980) is a Republican member of the Ohio Senate for the 8th district, and a former member of the Ohio House of Representatives for the 29th District. He is the son of Lou Blessing, who previously served in the Ohio Senate and the Ohio House of Representatives, before he was forced to step down due to term limits.

== Early life, education, and pre-political career ==
Blessing was born in 1980 in Cincinnati, Ohio, the son of Louis William and Linda Ann (née Lameier) Blessing Jr. He graduated from La Salle High School in Cincinnati in 1999, and then from the University of Cincinnati in 2003, earning a B.A. in Mathematics. He later went on to obtain a B.S. degree in electrical engineering from the University of Cincinnati in 2007.

As a practicing engineer, Blessing earned his professional engineer's license in 2011.

== Abortion legislation ==
In 2019, Blessing co-sponsored Ohio Senate Bill 23, commonly known as the "Heartbeat Bill." The law prohibits abortions once a fetal heartbeat is detectable, typically around six weeks into pregnancy. It includes no exceptions for cases of rape or incest. Governor Mike DeWine signed the bill into law on April 11, 2019.

Blessing’s support aligned with efforts by Ohio’s Republican lawmakers to significantly curtail abortion access in the state. SB 23 drew national attention and legal challenges upon passage.

In September 2022, a judge in Hamilton County temporarily blocked enforcement of the bill, restoring abortion access in Ohio up to 22 weeks of pregnancy while litigation continued.

== Ohio General Assembly ==
=== Ohio House of Representatives ===
==== Energy ====
In 2017 Blessing introduced H.B. 114, legislation aimed at reducing energy efficiency mandates and eliminating renewable energy mandates in Ohio. The bill passed the House with bipartisan support.

==== Banking and Finance ====
In 2017 Blessing introduced H.B. 199. This legislation created the Ohio Residential Mortgage Lending Act for the purpose of regulating all non-depository lending secured by residential real estate, limited the application of the current Mortgage Loan Law to unsecured loans and loans secured by other than residential real estate, and modified an exemption to the Ohio Consumer Installment Loan Act.

==== Heroin epidemic ====
Along with Representative Jonathan Dever, Blessing jointly sponsored H.B. 171 in the 131st General Assembly. The legislation sought to get drug dealers off of the streets by decreasing the minimum amount of heroin to be considered a first-degree felony trafficking violation.

==== Education ====
In 2015, Representatives Blessing and Jeff Rezabek jointly sponsored H.B. 299. The legislation allows children who are with a legal, permanent or temporary custodian to apply for one of the state's Autism Scholarships. A constituent in Blessing's district, who is the legal guardian of a young girl with Autism, had lost the Autism scholarship. The legislation was ultimately passed and signed by governor John Kasich.

==== Alcohol ====
Blessing, with fellow Cincinnati Representative Denise Driehaus, introduced H.B. 47, which sought to establish "outdoor refreshment areas": areas designated by local governments that allow for open containers.

In the 132nd General Assembly, Blessing sponsored H.B. 444, which allowed free sampling of alcohol beverages in restaurants.

=== Ohio Senate ===
Blessing entered the Ohio Senate on October 9, 2019, after the retirement of his predecessor Louis Terhar.

==== Committee assignments ====
During the 14th General Assembly, Blessing was assigned to the following Ohio Senate committees:

- (Chair of) Ways & Means Committee
- (Vice Chair of) Primary & Secondary Education Committee
- Finance Committee
- Transportation Committee

== Electoral history ==
Ohio House 29th District: Results 2012 to 2018
Year	Republican	Votes	Pct	Democrat	Votes	Pct	Green	Votes	Pct
2012	Louis W. Blessing III	31,427	61.27%	Hubert E. Brown	19,869	38.73%			
2014	Louis W. Blessing III	20,746	67.34%	Tammy Simendinger	8,852	28.73%	Nathan D. Lane	1,209	3.92%
2016	Louis W. Blessing III	37,138	100%						
2018	Louis W. Blessing III	28,386	64.43%	Carrie R. Davis	15,668	35.57%			

== Personal life ==
Blessing and his wife Heather have two children: Louis William Blessing IV and James Warner Blessing.
