= Lou Blessing =

American politician

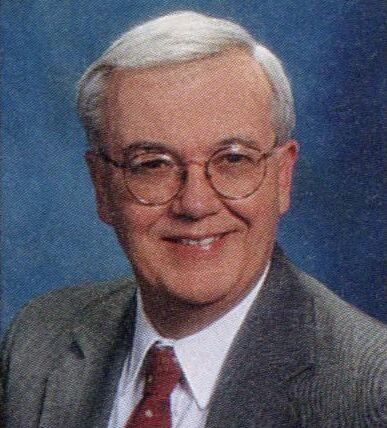

Member of the Ohio House of Representatives from the 29th district
- In office January 3, 2005 – December 31, 2012
- Preceded by: Patricia Clancy
- Succeeded by: Louis Blessing
- In office January 3, 1983 – December 31, 1996
- Preceded by: Helen Fix
- Succeeded by: Patricia Clancy

Member of the Ohio Senate from the 8th district
- In office January 6, 1997 – December 31, 2004
- Preceded by: Stanley Aronoff
- Succeeded by: Patricia Clancy

Personal details
- Born: August 1, 1948 (age 78) Cincinnati, Ohio
- Party: Republican
- Education: Northern Kentucky University, University of Cincinnati
- Profession: Attorney

Louis W. Blessing Jr. (born August 1, 1948) of Cincinnati, Ohio, is an American politician of the Republican party.

== Career ==
After graduation from the University of Cincinnati, he received a Juris Doctor degree from Northern Kentucky University law school. As an attorney, Blessing worked from the Hamilton County Common Pleas Court before being elected as a Colerain Township Trustee.

Blessing's career at the statehouse began in 1983, when he replaced Representative Helen Fix in a suburban Cincinnati district. He went on to serve seven terms in the House, for a total of fourteen years. He never faced considerable opposition in either a primary or general election throughout his tenure.

With term limits newly enacted and looming, eight-term incumbent Stanley Aronoff decided to retire in 1996 before being forced out of the Senate. As a result, Blessing forfeited an eighth term in the House for a run in the Senate. Facing no opposition in the primary, Blessing went on to win the general election with 65% of the vote. In 2000, Blessing was heavily favored in the strongly Republican district. Against Democrat Stuart Manning, Blessing won a second term, securing 63% of the vote.

In December 2002, Blessing, while traveling on I-71 in Ohio, was arrested and charged with a DUI after an Ohio state patrol officer found the state lawmaker had a blood-alcohol level of .11 percent when given a breathalyzer test, just over the legal limit.

By 2004, Blessing was facing term limits himself in the Senate. With Representative Patty Clancy also facing a term limit in the House, there was an opportunity for both Blessing and Clancy to run for each other's seats. However, Blessing first faced primary competition in Keith Corman. He went on to win the primary election with 52% of the electorate. Blessing went on to win the general election over Joseph R. Wolterman by about 7,000 votes, and retook a seat in the House after eight years in the Senate. Blessing was the first legislator post term-limits to go from the House to the Senate and then back to the House. He won reelection easily in 2006, 2008 and 2010.

For the 126th General Assembly, Blessing was named by Speaker of the House Jon Husted as vice chairman of the House Judiciary Committee, and for the 127th General Assembly was chosen as chairman of that committee.

With William G. Batchelder elected as minority leader of the House for the 128th General Assembly, Blessing was tabbed as assistant leader. However, when Republicans retook the majority in 2010, Blessing was again chosen for the second-highest Republican leadership position, speaker pro tempore. He also serves on the committees of criminal justice, rules and reference (as chairman); health and aging and its subcommittee on retirement and pensions; and state government and elections.

== Initiatives, policies and positions ==
=== Social issues ===
Along with Tracy Maxwell Heard, Blessing has introduced a plan to reduce Ohio's rising prison population and use part of the expected cost savings to strengthen felony probation supervision. While current law provides that certain adoption placement requirements do not apply to a stepparent, grandparent, or a guardian, Blessing has introduced a bill that would extend the exemption to the husband or wife of a grandparent.

=== Collective bargaining ===
As a member of the House Commerce and Labor Committee, Blessing played a key role in shaping a bill on collective bargaining reform, which will go forth to limit such for public employees. He favored limiting the same provisions for firefighters and law enforcement, although some cite Wisconsin's bill as allowing their collective bargaining to continue. Blessing has stated that while law doesn't state that employers have to pay non-union members the same wages as union members, it often happens anyway. He believed the bill would ultimately make it to John Kasich's desk for approval, which it did. He voted for the bill to pass out of committee, and did the same on the House floor. Blessing has stated that public employees shouldn't be concerned that they may receive pay cuts, and that the bill will actually help public employees. He has also stated that the bill will bring more accountability to the public sector. When asked if he would be willing to share in sacrificing his own pay, Blessing stated that he earns his pay, and isn't ashamed of what he makes.

=== Voter ID laws ===
In 2011, as state House speaker pro tem, Blessing sponsored voter ID legislation. The legislation was criticized by the nonprofit group Advocates for Basic Legal Equality, which opposed the law as erecting barriers to the right to vote. The highly controversial bill passed the state House on a party-line vote on a mostly party-line vote of 57-38.
