= Representative history of the Ohio House of Representatives =

The electoral history of each district in the Ohio House of Representatives can be traced from 1966 to the present.

Originally,

The [1851] constitution ... contained a complicated formula for apportionment, the so-called "major fraction rule." Under it, the state's population was divided by 100, with the resulting quotient being the ratio of representation in the House of Representatives. Any county with a population equal to at least half the ratio was entitled to one representative; a county with a population of less than half the ratio was grouped with an adjacent county for districting; a county containing a population of at least one and three-fourths the ratio was entitled to two representatives; a county with a population equal to three times the ratio was entitled to three representatives. To determine Senate districts, a similar procedure was followed; the starting point, however, was figured by dividing the state's population by 35. The ratios for the House and Senate and the resulting apportionment was determined by a board consisting of the governor, auditor, and secretary of state.

In 1903, at the urging of U.S. Senator Mark Hanna, who led the state's politically dominant Republican political machine, Ohio voters amended the state constitution to award each county one representative. The remaining representatives were apportioned to the counties on the basis of population. This provision later became known as the "Hanna amendment".

In June 1964, the Supreme Court of the United States ruled in Reynolds v. Sims, 377 U.S. 533 (1964) that state legislature districts had to be roughly equal in population. A case challenging the "Hanna amendment" reached the Supreme Court at about the same time as Reynolds v. Sims. On June 22, 1964, the Supreme Court held Ohio's method for apportioning representatives (but not state senators) to be in violation of the Constitution per the decision in Reynolds v. Sims. On remand, the United States District Court for the Northern District of Ohio ordered the state legislature to adopt a new apportionment scheme to comply with the holding in Nolan v. Rhodes.

Elections under the new apportionment scheme were first held in November 1966, for terms to begin per the Ohio Constitution on the first day in January 1967.

== 1st district ==
The 1st district has always been based in Wayne County and now consists of the entire county. It is one-third of the 27th Senate district. It has a Cook PVI of R+9.

Representative	Party	Term	Notes
Ralph Fisher	Republican	January 3, 1949 – December 31, 1970	Fisher lost re-election in 1970 to John E. Johnson
John Johnson	Democratic	January 3, 1971 – December 31, 1980	Johnson did not seek re-election in 1980.
Ron Amstutz	Republican	January 3, 1981 – December 31, 2000	Amstutz was term-limited in 2000 and won election to the Ohio Senate.
Jim Carmichael	Republican	January 3, 2001 – December 31, 2008	Carmichael was term-limited in 2008 and won election as a Wayne County Commissioner.
Ron Amstutz	Republican	January 5, 2009 – December 31, 2016	Amstutz was term-limited in 2016.
Scott Wiggam	Republican	January 3, 2017 – present	Incumbent.

== 2nd district ==
The 2nd district has always been based in Mansfield and now consists of all of Richland County. It is one-third of the 22nd Senate district. It has a Cook PVI of R+5.

Former U.S. Senator Sherrod Brown represented the district from 1975 to 1982.

Representative	Party	Term	Notes
Before 1967, seats were apportioned by county.
Richard Christiansen	Democratic	January 3, 1961 – December 31, 1972	Christiansen did not seek re-election in 1972.
Joan Douglass	Republican	January 3, 1973 – December 31, 1974	Douglass lost re-election in 1974 to Sherrod Brown.
Sherrod Brown	Democratic	January 3, 1975 – December 31, 1982	Brown did not seek re-election in 1982 and instead won election as Ohio Secretary of State.
Frank Sawyer	Democratic	January 3, 1983 – September 16, 1998	Sawyer resigned in 1998 due to poor health.
William J. Hartnett	Democratic	September 16, 1998 – December 31, 2006	Hartnett was term-limited in 2006.
Jay Goyal	Democratic	January 2, 2007 – December 31, 2012	Goyal did not seek re-election in 2012.
Mark Romanchuk	Republican	January 6, 2013 – present	Incumbent

== 3rd district ==
The 3rd district has always been based in Wood County and now consists of the entire county. It is one-third of the 2nd Senate district. It has a Cook PVI of R+1.

The district was represented by the Ohio Speaker of the House with Charles Kurfess from 1967 to 1972.

Representative	Party	Term	Notes
Before 1967, seats were apportioned by county.
Charles Kurfess	Republican	January 3, 1957 – December 31, 1978	Kurfess served as House Speaker from 1967 to 1972 and did not seek re-election in 1978.
Robert Brown	Republican	January 3, 1979 – November 15, 1985	Brown resigned in 1985 to serve as Director of the Ohio Department of MRDD.
Randy Gardner	Republican	November 15, 1985 – December 31, 2000	Gardner was term-limited in 2000.
Bob Latta	Republican	January 3, 2001 – December 13, 2007	Latta resigned to take a seat in the United States House of Representatives.
Randy Gardner	Republican	January 10, 2008 – December 31, 2012	Gardner did not seek re-election in 2012 and instead ran for the Ohio Senate.
Tim Brown	Republican	January 6, 2013 – July 30, 2016	Brown resigned to become President of the Toledo Metropolitan Area Council of Governments.
Theresa Gavarone	Republican	August 2, 2016 – February 6, 2019	Gavarone resigned to take a seat in the Ohio Senate.
Haraz Ghanbari	Republican	March 27, 2019 – present	Incumbent

== 4th district ==
The 4th district has always been based in Lima, Ohio and Allen County and now consists of the entire county. It is one-third of the 12th Senate district. It has a Cook PVI of R+11.

Representative	Party	Term	Notes
Before 1967, seats were apportioned by county.
Walter White	Republican	January 3, 1957 – December 31, 1972	White did not seek re-election in 1972 and instead won election to the Ohio Senate.
Ben Rose	Republican	January 3, 1973 – December 31, 1986	Rose did not seek re-election in 1986 and instead ran for Ohio State Auditor.
Bill Thompson	Republican	January 2, 1987 – August 8, 1997	Thompson resigned after appointment to the Ohio Industrial Commission.
John R. Willamowski	Republican	August 8, 1997 – December 31, 2006	Willamowski was term-limited in 2006.
Matt Huffman	Republican	January 2, 2007 – December 31, 2014	Huffman was term-limited in 2014.
Robert Cupp	Republican	January 5, 2015 – present	Incumbent

== 5th district ==
The 5th district has always consisted of the entirety of Columbiana County. It is one-third of the 33rd Senate district. It has a Cook PVI of D+2.

Representative	Party	Term	Notes
Before 1967, seats were apportioned by county.
Clarence Wetzel	Republican	January 3, 1949 – December 31, 1970	Wetzel lost re-election in 1970 to John Wargo
John Wargo	Democratic	January 3, 1971 – December 31, 1982	Wargo did not seek re-election and instead won election as Columbiana County Commissioner.
John D. Shivers Jr.	Democratic	January 2, 1983 – May 23, 1990	Shivers resigned after he was appointed to the Columbiana County Common Pleas Court.
Sean D. Logan	Democratic	May 23, 1990 – December 31, 2000	Logan was term-limited in 2000.
Chuck Blasdel	Republican	January 3, 2001 – December 31, 2006	Blasdel did not seek re-election in 2006 and instead ran for the United States Congress.
Linda Bolon	Democratic	January 2, 2007 – December 31, 2010	Bolon lost re-election in 2010 to Craig Newbold.
Craig Newbold	Republican	January 3, 2011 – December 31, 2012	Newbold lost re-election in 2012 to Nick Barborak.
Nick Barborak	Democratic	January 6, 2013 – December 31, 2014	Barborak lost re-election in 2014 to Tim Ginter.
Tim Ginter	Republican	January 6, 2015 – present	Incumbent

== 6th district ==
The 6th district has always consisted of portions of Cuyahoga County and now comprises Broadview Heights, Seven Hills, Brecksville, Independence, Valley View, Walton Hills, Oakwood, Glenwillow, Solon, Bentleyville, Chagrin Falls, Moreland Hills, Hunting Valley, Gates Mills, Mayfield, Highland Heights and Lyndhurst. It is one-third of the 24th Senate district.

It has a Cook PVI of R+2.

Representative	Party	Term	Notes
Before 1967, seats were apportioned by county.
Donald Nowack	Democratic	January 3, 1967 – December 31, 1970	Nowack lost the party renomination to Robert Jaskulski in 1970.
Robert Jaskulski	Democratic	January 3, 1971 – December 31, 1978	Jaskulski did not seek re-election in 1978.
Frank Mahnic	Democratic	January 3, 1979 – December 31, 1984	Mahnic did not seek re-election in 1982 and instead ran for the Ohio Senate.
John Carroll	Democratic	January 3, 1985 – January 6, 1985	Carroll died in office prior to the expiration of his term.
Robert Jaskulski	Democratic	February 13, 1985 – December 31, 1988	Jaskulski lost the party renomination to Frank Mahnic, Jr. in 1988.
Frank Mahnic, Jr.	Democratic	January 3, 1989 – December 31, 1992	Mahnic lost reelection in 1992 to Mike Wise.
Mike Wise	Republican	January 3, 1993 – December 31, 1998	Wise did not seek re-election in 1998.
Jim Trakas	Republican	January 3, 1999 – December 31, 2006	Trakas was term-limited in 2006.
Josh Mandel	Republican	January 2, 2007 – December 31, 2010	Mandel did not seek re-election in 2010 and instead won election as Ohio State Treasurer.
Marlene Anielski	Republican	January 3, 2011 – December 31, 2018	Anielski was term-limited.
Phil Robinson	Democratic	January 3, 2019 – present	Incumbent

== 7th district ==
The 7th district has always consisted of portions of Cuyahoga County and now comprises Olmsted, Olmsted Falls, Berea, Strongsville, and North Ridgeville. It is one-third of the 24th Senate district. It has a Cook PVI of R+2.

Representative	Party	Term	Notes
Before 1967, seats were apportioned by county.
James Celebrezze	Democraticic	January 3, 1965 – December 31, 1974	Celebrezze did not seek re-election in 1974.
Rocco Colonna	Democratic	January 3, 1974 – May 12, 1998	Colonna resigned to become a member of the Ohio Liquor Commission.
Erin Sullivan	Democratic	June 23, 1998 – December 31, 2002	Sullivan did not seek re-election in 2002.
Tom Patton	Republican	January 3, 2003 – November 18, 2008	Patton resigned to take a seat in the Ohio Senate.
Colleen Grady	Republican	November 18, 2008 – December 31, 2008	Grady served the remainder of Tom Patton's term in 2008.
Matt Patten	Democratic	January 5, 2009 – December 31, 2010	Patten was defeated for re-election in 2010 by Mike Dovilla.
Mike Dovilla	Republican	January 3, 2011 – December 31, 2016	Dovilla retired to run for the Ohio Senate, but lost.
Tom Patton	Republican	January 3, 2017 – present	Incumbent.

== 8th district ==
The 8th district has always consisted of portions of Cuyahoga County and now comprises Euclid, East Cleveland, Richmond Heights, South Euclid, Beachwood, Woodmere and portions of Cleveland. It is one-third of the 25th Senate district. It has a Cook PVI of D+26.

Speaker of the House Armond Budish held the seat from 2007 to 2014.

Representative	Party	Term	Notes
Before 1967, seats were apportioned by county.
Allen J. Bartunek	Republican	January 3, 1967 – December 31, 1970	Bartunek did not seek re-election in 1970.
John Sweeney	Democratic	January 3, 1971 – December 31, 1974	Sweeney did not seek re-election in 1974.
Arthur Brooks	Democratic	January 3, 1975 – December 31, 1978	Brooks did not seek re-election in 1978.
Mary Boyle	Democratic	January 3, 1979 – December 31, 1984	Boyle did not seek re-election in 1984 and instead won election as County Commissioner.
Jane Campbell	Democratic	January 3, 1985 – December 31, 1996	Campbell did not seek re-election in 1996 and instead won election as County Commissioner.
Peter Lawson Jones	Democratic	January 3, 1997 – February 5, 2002	Lawson Jones resigned upon being appointed as County Commissioner.
Lance Mason	Democratic	February 20, 2002 – December 31, 2006	Mason did not run for re-election in 2006 and instead won election to the Ohio Senate.
Armond Budish	Democratic	January 2, 2007 – December 31, 2014	Budish was term-limited in 2014 and won election as Cuyahoga County Executive.
Kent Smith	Democratic	January 5, 2015 – present	Incumbent

== 9th district ==
The 9th district has always consisted of portions of Cuyahoga County and now comprises Cleveland Heights, University Heights, Shaker Heights and portions of Cleveland. It is one-third of the 21st Senate district.

It has a Cook PVI of D+32.

Representative	Party	Term	Notes
Before 1967, seats were apportioned by county.
Richard Hollington	Republican	January 3, 1967 – December 31, 1970	Hollington lost re-election in 1970 to Harry Lehman.
Harry Lehman	Democratic	January 3, 1971 – December 31, 1980	Lehman did not seek re-election in 1980.
Lee Fisher	Democratic	January 3, 1981 – December 31, 1982	Fisher did not seek re-election in 1982 and instead won election to the Ohio Senate.
Judy Sheerer	Democratic	January 3, 1983 – December 31, 1992	Sheerer did not seek re-election in 1992.
Barbara Boyd	Democratic	January 3, 1993 – December 31, 2000	Boyd was term-limited in 2000.
Claudette Woodard	Democratic	January 3, 2001 – December 31, 2006	Woodard did not seek re-election and instead ran for the Ohio Senate.
Barbara Boyd	Democratic	January 2, 2007 – December 31, 2014	Boyd was term-limited in 2014.
Janine Boyd	Democratic	January 6, 2015 – present	Incumbent

== 10th district ==
The 10th district has always consisted of portions of Cuyahoga County and now comprises Bratenahl and portions of Cleveland. It is one-third of the 21st Senate district. It has a Cook PVI of D+34.

Representative	Party	Term	Notes
Before 1967, seats were apportioned by county.
Tom Hill	Democratic	January 3, 1967 – December 31, 1970	Hill lost the party renomination in 1970 to Ike Thompson.
Ike Thompson	Democratic	January 3, 1971 – December 31, 1990	Thompson did not seek re-election in 1990 facing a sexual harassment scandal.
C.J. Prentiss	Democratic	January 3, 1991 – December 31, 1998	Prentiss did not seek re-election in 1998 and instead won election to the Ohio Senate.
Shirley Smith	Democratic	January 3, 1999 – December 31, 2006	Smith was term-limited in 2006 and won election to the Ohio Senate.
Eugene Miller	Democratic	January 2, 2007 – March 5, 2009	Miller resigned in 2009 to take a seat on Cleveland City Council.
Robin Belcher	Democratic	March 16, 2009 – December 31, 2010	Belcher lost the party nomination in 2010 to Bill Patmon.
Bill Patmon	Democratic	January 3, 2011 – present	Incumbent

== 11th district ==
The 11th district has been based in Cleveland and Cuyahoga County since 1966 and now consists of portions of Cleveland and all of Garfield Heights and Newburgh Heights. It is one-third of the 21st Senate district. It has a Cook PVI of D+32.

The district was represented from 1967 to 2000 by Troy Lee James, the longest-serving African-American legislator in Ohio history.

Representative	Party	Term	Notes
Before 1967, seats were apportioned by county.
Troy Lee James	Democratic	January 3, 1967 – December 31, 2000	James was term-limited in 2000.
Annie L. Key	Democratic	January 3, 2001 – December 31, 2006	Key did not run for re-election in 2006 and instead ran for the Ohio Senate.
Sandra Williams	Democratic	January 2, 2007 – December 31, 2014	Williams was term-limited in 2014 and won election to the Ohio Senate.
Stephanie Howse	Democratic	January 5, 2015 – present	Incumbent

== 12th district ==
The 12th district has always consisted of portions of Cuyahoga County and now comprises Mayfield Heights, Pepper Pike, Orange, North Randall, Warrensville Heights, Highland Hills, Bedford, Bedford Heights, Maple Heights and portions of Cleveland. It is one-third of the 25th Senate district. It has a Cook PVI of D+30.

Representative	Party	Term	Notes
Before 1967, seats were apportioned by county.
Carl Stokes	Democratic	January 3, 1967 – January 15, 1968	Stokes resigned after winning election as Mayor of Cleveland.
Phillip DeLaine	Democratic	January 15, 1968 – December 31, 1970	DeLaine lost the party renomination in 1970 to John Thompson.
John Thompson	Democratic	January 3, 1971 – October 16, 1986	Thompson died in 1986 while in office.
Vermel Whalen	Democratic	November 16, 1986 – December 31, 1998	Whalen did not seek re-election in 1998.
John E. Barnes Jr.	Democratic	January 3, 1999 – February 13, 2002	Barnes resigned in 2002 to serve as Cleveland Mayor Jane Campbell's public relations director.
Michael DeBose	Democratic	February 13, 2002 – December 31, 2010	DeBose was term-limited in 2010.
John E. Barnes, Jr.	Democratic	January 3, 2011 – December 31, 2018	Barnes was term-limited in 2018.
Juanita Brent	Democratic	January 3, 2019 – present	Incumbent

== 13th district ==
The 13th district has always consisted of portions of Cuyahoga County and now comprises Lakewood, Linndale and portions of Cleveland. It is one-third of the 23rd Senate district. It has a Cook PVI of D+20.

Ohio Governor Richard Celeste held the seat from 1971 to 1974.

Representative	Party	Term	Notes
Before 1967, seats were apportioned by county.
Mark C. Schinnerer	Republican	January 3, 1967 – December 31, 1970	Schinnerer did not seek re-election in 1970.
Richard Celeste	Democratic	January 3, 1971 – December 31, 1974	Celeste did not run for re-election in 1974 and instead ran for Lieutenant Governor.
Francine Panehal	Democratic	January 3, 1975 – December 31, 1988	Panehal did not seek re-election in 1988.
Madeline Cain	Democratic	January 3, 1989 – December 31, 1995	Cain resigned after winning election as for Mayor of Lakewood, Ohio in 1995.
Dan Brady	Democratic	January 6, 1996 – December 31, 1998	Brady did not seek re-election in 1998 and instead won election to the Ohio Senate.
Bryan Flannery	Democratic	January 5, 1999 – December 31, 2002	Flannery did not seek re-election in 2002 and instead ran for Ohio Secretary of State.
Michael J. Skindell	Democratic	January 3, 2003 – December 31, 2010	Skindell was term-limited in 2010 and won election to the Ohio Senate.
Nickie Antonio	Democratic	January 3, 2011 – December 31, 2018	Antonio was term-limited in 2018.
Michael J. Skindell	Democratic	January 3, 2019 – present	Incumbent

== 14th district ==
The 14th district has been based in Cleveland and Cuyahoga County since 1966, and now consists of portions of Cleveland and all of Brooklyn, Brook Park, Parma Heights and Middleburg Heights. It is one-third of the 23rd Senate district. It has a Cook PVI of D+10.

Representative	Party	Term	Notes
Before 1967, seats were apportioned by county.
Patrick Sweeney	Democratic	January 3, 1967 – December 31, 1996	Sweeney resigned in 1996 to take a seat in the Ohio Senate.
Dale Miller	Democratic	January 3, 1997 – February 28, 2006	Miller resigned in 2006 to take a seat in the Ohio Senate.
Mike Foley	Democratic	March 1, 2006 – December 31, 2014	Foley was term-limited in 2014.
Martin J. Sweeney	Democratic	January 6, 2013 – December 31, 2018	Sweeney did not seek re-election in 2018 and instead ran for the Ohio Senate.
Bride Rose Sweeney	Democratic	January 6, 2019 – present	Incumbent

== 15th district ==
The 15th district has always consisted of portions of Cuyahoga County and now comprises Cuyahoga Heights, Brooklyn Heights, Parma and portions of Cleveland. It is one-third of the 23rd Senate district. It has a Cook PVI of D+8.

Representative	Party	Term	Notes
Before 1967, seats were apportioned by county.
Anthony Russo	Democratic	January 3, 1967 – December 31, 1972	Russo did not seek re-election in 1972.
Jerome Stano	Democratic	January 3, 1973 – December 31, 1974	Stano did not seek re-election in 1974 and instead won election to the Ohio Senate.
Ken Rocco	Democratic	January 3, 1975 – December 31, 1982	Rocco did not seek re-election in 1982.
June Kreuzer	Democratic	January 3, 1983 – December 31, 1986	Kreuzer did not seek re-election in 1986.
Ron Mottl	Democratic	January 2, 1987 – February 5, 1997	Mottl resigned in 1997 prior to the expiration of his term.
Ron Mottl Jr.	Democratic	February 5, 1997 – December 31, 1998	Mottl lost the party renomination in 1998 to Dean DePiero.
Dean DePiero	Democratic	January 5, 1999 – December 2, 2003	DePiero resigned in 2003 after winning election as Mayor of Parma.
Timothy J. DeGeeter	Democratic	December 2, 2003 – December 15, 2011	DeGeeter resigned in 2011 after winning election as Mayor of Parma.
Nicholas J. Celebrezze	Democratic	December 15, 2012 – present	Incumbent

== 16th district ==
The 16th district has been based in Cleveland and Cuyahoga County since 1966, and now consists of Bay Village, Rocky River, Westlake, Fairview Park and North Olmsted. It is one-third of the 24th Senate district. It has a Cook PVI of R+3.

Representative	Party	Term	Notes
Before 1967, seats were apportioned by county.
George Mastics	Republican	January 3, 1967 – December 31, 1974	Mastics did not seek re-election in 1974 and instead ran for the United States Congress.
Jim Betts	Republican	January 3, 1975 – December 31, 1980	Betts did not seek re-election in 1980 and instead ran for United States Senate.
Jim Petro	Republican	January 3, 1981 – May 22, 1984	Petro resigned in 1984 prior to the expiration of his term.
Jeff Jacobs	Republican	May 23, 1984 – December 31, 1986	Jacobs did not seek re-election in 1986 and instead ran for Ohio State Treasurer.
Jim Petro	Republican	January 2, 1987 – December 31, 1990	Petro did not seek re-election in 1990 and instead ran for Ohio Attorney General.
Ed Kasputis	Republican	January 3, 1991 – December 31, 1998	Kasputis did not seek re-election in 1998 and instead ran for Ohio State Treasurer.
Sally Conway Kilbane	Republican	January 5, 1999 – December 31, 2006	Kilbane was term-limited in 2006.
Jennifer Brady	Democratic	January 2, 2007 – December 31, 2008	Brady lost re-election in 2008 to Nan Baker.
Nan Baker	Republican	January 5, 2009 – December 31, 2016	Baker was term-limited in 2016.
David Greenspan	Republican	January 3, 2017 – present	Incumbent

== 17th district ==
The 17th district has been based in Columbus, Ohio and Franklin County since 2012, and now consists of Valleyview, Marble Cliff, and portions of Columbus. It is one-third of the 3rd Senate district. It has a Cook PVI of D+6.

Representative	Party	Term	Notes
Michael Curtin	Democratic	January 6, 2013 – December 31, 2016	Curtin did not seek re-election in 2016.
Adam Miller	Democratic	January 3, 2017 – present	Incumbent

== 18th district ==
The 18th district has been based in Columbus, Ohio and Franklin County since 1966, and now consists of Grandview Heights, Bexley, and portions of Columbus and Clinton Township. It is one-third of the 15th Senate district. It has a Cook PVI of D+20.

Representative	Party	Term	Notes
Before 1967, seats were apportioned by county.
Doris Jones	Republican	January 3, 1967 – December 31, 1972	Jones did not seek re-election in 1972.
Mike Stinziano	Democratic	January 3, 1973 – December 31, 1994	Stinziano lost re-election in 1994 to Amy Salerno.
Amy Salerno	Republican	January 3, 1995 – December 31, 2002	Salerno was term-limited in 2002.
Dan Stewart	Democratic	January 3, 2003 – December 31, 2010	Stewart was term-limited in 2010.
Michael Stinziano	Democratic	January 3, 2011 – December 31, 2015	Stinziano resigned following his election to the Columbus City Council.
Kristin Boggs	Democratic	January 16, 2016 – present	Incumbent

== 19th district ==
The 19th district has been based in Columbus, Ohio and Franklin County since 1966, and now consists of Westerville, New Albany, Minerva Park, Gahanna and Plain Township and portions of Sharon Township, Blendon Township, Mifflin Township and Columbus. It is one-third of the 3rd Senate district. It has a Cook PVI of R+6.

The district was represented by the Speaker of the House with Jo Ann Davidson from 1995 to 2000.

Representative	Party	Term	Notes
Before 1967, seats were apportioned by county.
Alan Norris	Republican	January 3, 1967 – December 31, 1980	Norris did not seek re-election in 1980.
Jo Ann Davidson	Republican	January 3, 1981 – December 31, 2000	Davidson was Speaker of the House from 1995 to 2000 and term-limited in 2000.
Larry L. Flowers	Republican	January 3, 2001 – December 31, 2008	Flowers was term-limited in 2008.
Marian Harris	Democratic	January 5, 2009 – December 31, 2010	Harris lost re-election in 2010 to Anne Gonzales.
Anne Gonzales	Republican	January 3, 2011 – present	Incumbent

== 20th district ==
The 20th district has been based in Columbus, Ohio and Franklin County since 1966, and now consists of Whitehall, Reynoldsburg, Groveport, Obetz, Lockbourne and Jefferson Township and portions of Truro Township, Madison Township, Hamilton Township, Pickerington, Canal Winchester, Lithopolis and Columbus.

It is one-third of the 3rd Senate district. It has a Cook PVI of R+1.

Representative	Party	Term	Notes
Before 1967, seats were apportioned by county.
Roger Tracy	Republican	January 3, 1967 – December 31, 1980	Tracy lost re-election in 1970 to James Baumann.
James Baumann	Democratic	January 3, 1971 – December 31, 1976	Baumann did not seek re-election and instead ran for the United States Congress in 1976.
Dean Conley	Democratic	January 3, 1979 – December 31, 1992	Conley was redistricted out of his district in 1992 and did not seek re-election.
Jim Mason	Republican	January 3, 1993 – March 30, 1998	Mason resigned his seat in 1998 to take appointment to the Ohio Court of Appeals.
David Goodman	Republican	March 30, 1998 – October 2, 2001	Goodman resigned his seat in 2001 to take an appointment to the Ohio Senate.
Jim McGregor	Republican	October 10, 2001 – December 31, 2008	McGregor lost re-election in 2008 to Nancy Garland.
Nancy Garland	Democratic	January 5, 2009 – December 31, 2012	Garland was redistricted out of her district in 2012 and did not seek re-election.
Heather Bishoff	Democratic	January 6, 2013 – May 21, 2017	Bishoff resigned in 2017 to spend more time with family.
Richard Brown	Democratic	June 28, 2017 – present	Incumbent

== 21st district ==
The 21st district has been based in Columbus, Ohio and Franklin County since 1992 and now consists of Worthington, Dublin, Riverlea, and portions of Columbus, Perry Township, Sharon Township, Washington Township and Norwich Township. It is one-third of the 16th Senate district. It has a Cook PVI of R+7.

Representative	Party	Term	Notes
Pat Tiberi	Republican	January 3, 1993 – December 31, 2000	Tiberi was term-limited and won election to the United States Congress.
Linda Reidelbach	Republican	January 3, 2001 – December 31, 2006	Reidelbach did not seek re-election in 2006.
Kevin Bacon	Republican	January 2, 2007 – December 31, 2010	Bacon did not seek re-election in 2010 and instead won election to the Ohio Senate.
Mike Duffey	Republican	January 3, 2011 – December 31, 2018	Term limited.
Beth Liston	Democrat	January 7, 2019 – present	Incumbent

== 22nd district ==
The 22nd district has been based in Columbus, Ohio and Franklin County since 1966 and now consists of portions of Columbus. It is one-third of the 19th Senate district. It has a Cook PVI of D+9.

Representative	Party	Term	Notes
Before 1967, seats were apportioned by county.
Robert E. Holmes	Democratic	January 3, 1961 – December 31, 1968	Holmes did not seek re-election in 1968 and instead ran for the Ohio District Courts of Appeals.
Larry Hughes	Democratic	January 3, 1969 – December 31, 1982	Hughes lost re-election in 1982 to David J. Leland.
David J. Leland	Democratic	January 3, 1983 – December 31, 1984	Leland lost re-election in 1984 to E. J. Thomas.
E. J. Thomas	Republican	January 3, 1985 – November 4, 1999	Thomas resigned in 1999 prior to the expiration of his term.
David J. Robinson	Republican	December 8, 1999 – September 12, 2000	Robinson lost re-nomination and resigned prior to the expiration of his term.
Jim Hughes	Republican	September 13, 2000 – December 31, 2008	Hughes was term-limited in 2008 and ran for the Ohio Senate.
John Patrick Carney	Democratic	January 5, 2009 – December 31, 2014	Carney did not seek re-election in 2014 and instead ran for Ohio State Auditor.
David J. Leland	Democratic	January 6, 2015 – present	Incumbent

== 23rd district ==
The 23rd district has been based in Columbus, Ohio and Franklin County since 1972 and now consists of Grove City, Jackson Township, Urbancrest, and portions of Columbus, Franklin Township, Hilliard, Prairie Township and Norwich Township. It is one-third of the 16th Senate district. It has a Cook PVI of R+6.

Representative	Party	Term	Notes
Bill O'Neil	Republican	January 3, 1973 – March 11, 1980	O'Neil resigned in 1980 prior to the expiration of his term.
Dana Deshler	Republican	March 11, 1980 – December 31, 1986	Deshler did not seek re-election in 1986.
Bill Schuck	Republican	January 2, 1987 – December 31, 2000	Schuck was term-limited in 2000.
Larry Wolpert	Republican	January 3, 2001 – December 31, 2008	Wolpert was term-limited in 2008.
Cheryl Grossman	Republican	January 5, 2009 – December 31, 2016	Grossman was term-limited in 2016.
Laura Lanese	Republican	January 3, 2017 – present	Incumbent

== 24th district ==
The 24th district has been based in Columbus, Ohio and Franklin County since 1966 and now consists of Brown Township, Harrisburg, Pleasant Township, Upper Arlington and portions of Columbus, Franklin Township, Hilliard, Prairie Township, Perry Township, Sharon Township, Washington Township and Norwich Township. It is one-third of the 16th Senate district. It has a Cook PVI of R+6.

Representative	Party	Term	Notes
Before 1967, seats were apportioned by county.
Mack Pemberton	Republican	January 3, 1967 – December 31, 1978	Pemberton did not seek re-election in 1978.
Don Gilmore	Republican	January 3, 1979 – December 31, 1990	Gilmore lost re-election in 1990 to Richard Cordray.
Richard Cordray	Democratic	January 3, 1991 – December 31, 1993	Cordray did not seek re-election in 1992 and instead ran for the United States Congress.
Priscilla D. Mead	Republican	January 3, 1993 – December 31, 2000	Mead was term-limited and won election to the Ohio Senate.
Geoffrey C. Smith	Republican	January 3, 2001 – December 31, 2006	Smith lost re-election in 2006 to Ted Celeste.
Ted Celeste	Democratic	January 2, 2007 – December 31, 2012	Celeste did not seek re-election in 2012 and instead ran for the United States Congress.
Stephanie Kunze	Republican	January 6, 2013 – December 31, 2016	Kunze did not seek re-election in 2016 and instead ran for the Ohio Senate.
Jim Hughes	Republican	January 3, 2017 – December 31, 2018	Hughes did not seek re-election in 2018.
Allison Russo	Democratic	January 7, 2019 – present	Incumbent

== 25th district ==
The 25th district has been based in Columbus, Ohio and Franklin County since 1966 and now consists of portions of Columbus, Clinton Township and Mifflin Township. It is one-third of the 15th Senate district. It has a Cook PVI of D+28.

Congresswoman Joyce Beatty represented the district from 1999 to 2008.

Representative	Party	Term	Notes
Before 1967, seats were apportioned by county.
Phale Hale	Democratic	January 3, 1967 – April 22, 1980	Hale resigned in 1980 to take a position with the Democratic National Committee.
Otto Beatty Jr.	Democratic	April 22, 1980 – May 30, 1999	Beatty resigned his seat in 1999 to pursue business opportunities.
Joyce Beatty	Democratic	May 31, 1999 – December 31, 2008	Beatty was term-limited in 2008.
W. Carlton Weddington	Democratic	January 5, 2009 – April 24, 2012	Weddington resigned his seat due to corruption charges in 2012.
Kevin Boyce	Democratic	May 6, 2012 – December 31, 2016	Boyce did not seek re-election and instead ran for Franklin County Commissioner.
Bernadine Kent	Democratic	January 3, 2017 – present	Incumbent

== 26th district ==
The 26th district has been based in Columbus, Ohio and Franklin County since 1966 and now consists of Brice and portions of Columbus, Madison Township and Truro Township. It is one-third of the 15th Senate district. It has a Cook PVI of D+25.

Representative	Party	Term	Notes
Before 1967, seats were apportioned by county.
Keith McNamara	Republican	January 3, 1961 – December 31, 1972	McNamara did not seek re-election in 1972.
William Kopp	Democratic	January 3, 1973 – December 31, 1976	Kopp did not seek re-election in 1976.
Leslie Brown	Democratic	January 3, 1977 – December 31, 1982	Brown did not seek re-election in 1982.
Ray Miller	Democratic	January 3, 1983 – July 1, 1993	Miller resigned in 1993 to form the National Urban Policy Institute.
Charleta Tavares	Democratic	July 1, 1993 – December 31, 1998	Tavares did not seek re-election in 1998 and instead ran for Ohio Secretary of State.
Ray Miller	Democratic	January 5, 1999 – December 31, 2002	Miller did not seek re-election in 2002 and instead won election to the Ohio Senate.
Larry Price	Democratic	January 3, 2003 – December 31, 2004	Price lost the party renomination in 2004 to Mike Mitchell.
Mike Mitchell	Democratic	January 3, 2005 – December 31, 2006	Mitchell lost the party renomination in 2006 to Tracy Heard.
Tracy Heard	Democratic	January 2, 2007 – December 31, 2014	Heard was term-limited in 2014.
Hearcel Craig	Democratic	January 6, 2015 – present	Incumbent

== 27th district ==
The 27th district has been based in Cincinnati, Ohio and Hamilton County since 1966 and now consists Indian Hill, Mariemont, Newtown, Terrace Park, Anderson Township and of portions of Cincinnati, Loveland and Symmes Township. It is one-third of the 7th Senate district. It has a Cook PVI of R+14.

The district was represented by future Ohio Governor Bob Taft from 1977 to 1980.

Representative	Party	Term	Notes
Before 1967, seats were apportioned by county.
Ralph B. Kohnen	Republican	January 3, 1963 – January 15, 1968	Kohnen resigned in 1968 after election to Cincinnati City Council.
Frank H. Mayfield	Republican	January 15, 1968 – December 16, 1975	Mayfield resigned in 1975 to focus on business opportunities.
Bob Taft	Republican	January 3, 1977 – December 31, 1980	Taft did not seek re-election in 1980 and instead won election as Hamilton County Commissioner.
John O'Brien	Republican	January 3, 1981 – March 15, 1985	O'Brien died in 1985 while in office.
Jacquelyn K. O'Brien	Republican	April 16, 1985 – December 31, 2000	O'Brien was term-limited in 2000.
Tom Brinkman	Republican	January 3, 2001 – December 31, 2008	Brinkman was term-limited in 2008.
Peter Stautberg	Republican	January 5, 2009 – December 31, 2014	Stautberg lost the party re-nomination in 2014 to Tom Brinkman.
Tom Brinkman	Republican	January 5, 2015 – present	Incumbent

== 28th district ==
The 28th district has been based in greater Cincinnati, Ohio and Hamilton County since 1966 and now consists of Blue Ash, Deer Park, Evendale, Fairfield, Forest Park, Glendale, Greenhills, Madeira, Montgomery, Reading, Sharonville and Springdale.

It is one-third of the 8th Senate district. It has a Cook PVI of R+6.

Representative	Party	Term	Notes
Before 1967, seats were apportioned by county.
Bill Anderson	Republican	January 3, 1967 – December 31, 1968	Anderson did not seek re-election in 1968.
Thomas Pottenger	Republican	January 3, 1969 – December 31, 1972	Pottenger lost the party re-nomination in 1972 to Richard Finan.
Richard Finan	Republican	January 3, 1973 – September 18, 1978	Finan resigned following his appointment to the Ohio Senate.
Dale N. Van Vyven	Republican	September 14, 1978 – December 31, 2000	Van Vyven was term-limited in 2000.
Wayne Coates	Democratic	January 3, 2001 – December 31, 2002	Coates lost re-election in 2002 to Jim Raussen.
Jim Raussen	Republican	January 3, 2003 – August 18, 2008	Raussen resigned to become resigned to take a job with the Strickland administration.
Andrew Ciafardini	Republican	December 5, 2008 – December 31, 2008	Ciafardini served the remainder of Raussen's term in 2008.
Connie Pillich	Democratic	January 5, 2009 – December 31, 2014	Pillich did not seek re-election and instead ran for Ohio State Treasurer.
Jonathan Dever	Republican	January 6, 2015 – present	Incumbent

== 29th district ==
The 29th district has been based in greater Cincinnati, Ohio and Hamilton County since 1966 and now includes Addyston, Cleves, Harrison and North Bend. It is one-third of the 8th Senate district. It has a Cook PVI of R+15.

Lou Blessing or his son, Louis Blessing, have represented the district for all but 8 years since 1983.

Representative	Party	Term	Notes
Before 1967, seats were apportioned by county.
John Bechtold	Republican	January 3, 1967 – December 31, 1972	Bechtold lost the party renomination in 1972 to Helen Fix.
Helen Fix	Republican	January 3, 1973 – December 31, 1982	Fix did not seek re-election in 1982.
Lou Blessing	Republican	January 3, 1983 – December 31, 1996	Blessing did not seek re-election in 1996 and instead won election to the Ohio Senate.
Patricia Clancy	Republican	January 3, 1997 – December 31, 2004	Clancy was term-limited in 2004 and won election to the Ohio Senate.
Lou Blessing	Republican	January 3, 2005 – December 31, 2012	Blessing was term-limited in 2012.
Louis Blessing	Republican	January 3, 2012 – present	Incumbent

== 30th district ==
The 30th district has been based in greater Cincinnati, Ohio and Hamilton County since 1966 and now includes Cheviot, Delhi, Green Township and portions of Cincinnati. It is one-third of the 8th Senate district. It has a Cook PVI of R+21.

Representative	Party	Term	Notes
Before 1967, seats were apportioned by county.
Gordon H. Scherer	Republican	January 3, 1965 – December 31, 1972	Scherer did not seek re-election in 1972.
John Brandenberg	Republican	January 3, 1973 – December 31, 1976	Brandenberg did not seek re-election in 1976.
Thomas Pottenger	Republican	January 3, 1977 – July 20, 1990	Pottenger resigned following his appointment to the State Employment Relations Board.
Cheryl Winkler	Republican	July 20, 1990 – December 31, 2000	Winkler was term-limited in 2000.
Bill Seitz	Republican	January 3, 2001 – October 9, 2007	Seitz resigned following his appointment to the Ohio Senate.
Robert Mecklenborg	Republican	October 9, 2007 – August 18, 2011	Mecklenborg resigned following a DUI arrest in Indiana.
Louis Terhar	Republican	September 14, 2011 – December 31, 2016	Terhar did not seek re-election in 2016 and instead ran for the Ohio Senate.
Bill Seitz	Republican	January 3, 2017 – present	Incumbent.

== 31st district ==
The 31st district has been based in Cincinnati, Ohio and Hamilton County since 1966 and now consists Amberley, Silverton, Norwood, St. Bernard, Columbia Township and of portions of Cincinnati and Sycamore Township. It is one-third of the 9th Senate district. It has a Cook PVI of D+16.

Representative	Party	Term	Notes
Before 1967, seats were apportioned by county.
Norman Murdock	Republican	January 3, 1967 – December 31, 1978	Murdock did not seek re-election in 1978 but instead ran for Hamilton County Commissioner.
Jerome F. Luebbers	Democratic	January 3, 1979 – December 31, 2000	Luebbers was term-limited in 2000.
Steve Driehaus	Democratic	January 3, 2001 – December 31, 2008	Driehaus was term-limited in 2008 and won election to the United States Congress.
Denise Driehaus	Democratic	January 5, 2009 – December 31, 2016	Driehaus was term-limited and won election as Hamilton County Commissioner.
Brigid Kelly	Democratic	January 3, 2017 – present	Incumbent

== 32nd district ==
The 32nd district has been based in Cincinnati, Ohio and Hamilton County since 1966 and now consists Mount Healthy, North College Hill and of portions of Cincinnati and Springfield Township. It is one-third of the 9th Senate district. It has a Cook PVI of D+19.

Members of the Mallory family have held the seat for all but eight years since 1966.

Representative	Party	Term	Notes
Before 1967, seats were apportioned by county.
William L. Mallory, Sr.	Democratic	January 3, 1967 – December 31, 1994	Mallory did not seek re-election in 1994.
Mark L. Mallory	Democratic	January 3, 1995 – December 31, 1998	Mallory did not seek reelection in 1998 and instead won election to the Ohio Senate.
Catherine L. Barrett	Democratic	January 5, 1999 – December 31, 2006	Barrett was term-limited in 2006.
Dale Mallory	Democratic	January 2, 2007 – December 31, 2014	Mallory was term-limited in 2014.
Christie Bryant	Democratic	January 6, 2015 – December 31, 2016	Bryant did not seek re-election in 2016.
Catherine Ingram	Democratic	January 3, 2017 – present	Incumbent

== 33rd district ==
The 33rd district has been based in Cincinnati, Ohio and Hamilton County since 1966 and now consists of Arlington Heights, Elmwood Place, Golf Manor, Lincoln Heights, Lockland, Woodlawn, Wyoming and portions of Cincinnati, Springfield Township and Sycamore Township.

It is one-third of the 9th Senate district. It has a Cook PVI of D+18.

Representative	Party	Term	Notes
Before 1967, seats were apportioned by county.
Bill Bowen	Democratic	January 3, 1967 – February 11, 1970	Bowen resigned following his appointment to the Ohio Senate.
Ed Burden	Democratic	February 11, 1970 – December 31, 1970	Burden lost the party renomination in 1970 to James Rankin.
James Rankin	Democratic	January 3, 1971 – June 28, 1978	Rankin died prior to the expiration of his term.
Helen Rankin	Democratic	September 14, 1978 – December 31, 1994	Rankin did not seek re-election in 1994.
Samuel T. Britton	Democratic	January 3, 1995 – December 31, 2002	Britton was term-limited in 2002.
Tyrone Yates	Democratic	January 3, 2003 – February 5, 2010	Yates resigned following his appointment to the Hamilton County Municipal Court.
Alicia Reece	Democratic	March 3, 2010 – present	Incumbent

== 34th district ==
The 34th district has been based in Akron, Ohio since 1966 and now consists of portions of Akron, Bath Township and Cuyahoga Falls. It is one-third of the 28th Senate district. It has a Cook PVI of D+23.

Representative	Party	Term	Notes
Before 1967, seats were apportioned by county.
Robert Manning	Republican	January 3, 1967 – December 31, 1972	Manning was defeated in 1972 by Pete Crossland.
Pete Crossland	Democratic	January 3, 1973 – March 11, 1983	Crossland resigned after being named assistant director of the Ohio Department of Youth Services.
Vernon Sykes	Democratic	March 16, 1983 – December 31, 2000	Sykes was term-limited in 2000.
Barbara Sykes	Democratic	January 3, 2001 – December 31, 2006	Sykes did not seek re-election in 2006 and instead ran for Ohio State Auditor.
Vernon Sykes	Democratic	January 2, 2007 – December 31, 2014	Sykes was term-limited in 2014.
Emilia Sykes	Democratic	January 6, 2015 – present	Incumbent

== 35th district ==
The 35th district has been based in Akron, Ohio since 1966 and now consists of portions of Barberton and portions of Akron and Coventry Township. It is one-third of the 28th Senate district. It has a Cook PVI of D+14.

Representative	Party	Term	Notes
Before 1967, seats were apportioned by county.
John Poda	Democratic	January 3, 1967 – January 13, 1971	Poda resigned to take a seat in the Ohio Senate.
Ronald Weyandt	Democratic	January 13, 1971 – December 31, 1976	Weyandt did not seek re-election and instead won election as Summit County Sheriff.
Cliff Skeen	Democratic	January 3, 1977 – December 31, 1992	Skeen did not seek re-election in 1992.
Betty Sutton	Democratic	January 3, 1993 – December 31, 2000	Sutton was term-limited in 2000.
Robert J. Otterman	Democratic	January 3, 2001 – December 31, 2007	Otterman resigned prior to the expiration of his term.
John Otterman	Democratic	January 8, 2008 – December 31, 2010	Otterman lost the party renomination in 2010 to Zack Milkovich.
Zack Milkovich	Democratic	January 3, 2011 – December 31, 2014	Milkovich lost the party renomination in 2014 to Greta Johnson.
Greta Johnson	Democratic	January 6, 2015 – March 2, 2017	Johnson resigned to become Summit County Deputy Law Director.
Tavia Galonski	Democratic	May 10, 2017 – present	Incumbent

== 36th district ==
The 36th district has been based in Akron, Ohio and Summit County since 1966 and now consists of Lakemore, Mogadore, Tallmadge, Springfield Township, Coventry Township, Green Township and of portions of Cuyahoga Falls. It is one-third of the 28th Senate district. It has a Cook PVI of D+3.

Representative	Party	Term	Notes
Before 1967, seats were apportioned by county.
David Headley	Democratic	January 3, 1967 – December 31, 1972	Headley did not seek re-election in 1972 and instead won election to the Ohio Senate.
Kenneth Cox	Democratic	January 3, 1973 – December 31, 1976	Cox did not seek re-election in 1976 and instead won election to the Ohio Senate.
Bob Nettle	Democratic	January 3, 1977 – March 4, 1986	Nettle resigned his seat in 1986 following appointment to the Ohio Senate.
Tom Seese	Democratic	May 21, 1986 – December 31, 1994	Seese lost re-election in 1994 to Twyla Roman.
Twyla Roman	Republican	January 3, 1995 – December 31, 2002	Roman was term-limited in 2002.
Mary Taylor	Republican	January 3, 2003 – December 31, 2006	Taylor did not seek re-election in 2006 and instead won election as Ohio Auditor.
Steve Dyer	Democratic	January 2, 2007 – December 31, 2010	Dyer lost re-election in 2010 to Todd McKenney.
Todd McKenney	Republican	January 3, 2011 – December 13, 2011	McKenney resigned in 2011 following appointment to the Summit County Common Pleas Court.
Anthony DeVitis	Republican	December 16, 2011 – present	Incumbent

== 37th district ==
The 37th district has been based in Akron, Ohio and Summit County since 1966 and now consists of Hudson, Macedonia, Munroe Falls, Northfield, Reminderville, Silver Lake, Stow, Twinsburg and Twinsburg Township.

It is one-third of the 27th Senate district. It has a Cook PVI of R+2.

Representative	Party	Term	Notes
Before 1967, seats were apportioned by county.
Morris Boyd	Republican	January 3, 1967 – December 31, 1972	Boyd did not seek re-election in 1972.
Vernon Cook	Democratic	January 3, 1973 – November 23, 1987	Cook died while in office.
Wayne Jones	Democratic	January 6, 1988 – December 31, 1996	Jones did not seek re-election in 1996.
Kevin Coughlin	Republican	January 3, 1997 – February 5, 2001	Coughlin resigned to take a seat in the Ohio Senate.
John Widowfield	Republican	February 12, 2001 – May 28, 2008	Widowfield resigned following a scandal regarding Ohio State University football tickets.
Richard Nero	Republican	June 12, 2008 – December 31, 2008	Nero lost re-election in 2008 to Mike Moran.
Mike Moran	Democratic	January 5, 2009 – December 31, 2010	Moran lost re-election in 2010 to Kristina Roegner.
Kristina Roegner	Republican	January 3, 2011 – December 31, 2018	Roegner served four consecutive terms, which is the limit for the Ohio House of Representatives.
Casey Weinstein	Democratic	January 7, 2019 – Present	Incumbent

== 38th district ==
The 37th district has been based in Akron, Ohio and Summit County since 1966 and now consists of portions of Summit County including Boston Heights, Clinton, Fairlawn, New Franklin, Norton, Peninsula, Richfield, Boston, Copley, Richfield and Sagamore Hills Township and portions of Bath Township and portions of Stark County including Beach City, Brewster, Canal Fulton, Wilmot, Lawrence, Sugar Creek Townships and portions of Massillon and Tuscarawas Township.

It is one-third of the 27th Senate district. It has a Cook PVI of R+2.

Representative	Party	Term	Notes
Before 1967, seats were apportioned by county.
Claude Fiocca	Democratic	January 3, 1967 – December 31, 1974	Fiocca lost re-election in 1974 to Paul Wingard.
Paul Wingard	Republican	January 3, 1975 – December 31, 1976	Wingard lost re-election in 1976 to Thomas C. Sawyer.
Thomas C. Sawyer	Democratic	January 3, 1977 – December 31, 1983	Sawyer resigned after winning election as Mayor of Akron, Ohio.
Dominic Basile	Democratic	January 2, 1984 – December 31, 1984	Basile lost re-election in 1984 to Tom Watkins.
Tom Watkins	Republican	January 3, 1985 – December 31, 1992	Watkins was redistricted out of his district and lost re-election in 1992.
Karen Doty	Democratic	January 3, 1993 – December 31, 1996	Doty lost re-election in 1996 to Bryan C. Williams.
Bryan C. Williams	Republican	January 2, 1997 – March 5, 2004	Williams resigned after he took a seat on the Summit County Board of Elections.
Marilyn Slaby	Republican	March 5, 2004 – December 31, 2004	Slaby lost re-election in 2004 to Brian Williams.
Brian Williams	Democratic	January 3, 2005 – December 31, 2010	Williams lost re-election in 2010 to Lynn Slaby.
Lynn Slaby	Republican	January 3, 2011 – May 6, 2012	Slaby resigned to become a commissioner for the Public Utilities Commission of Ohio.
Marilyn Slaby	Republican	May 12, 2012 – present	Incumbent

== 39th district ==
The 39th district has been based in Dayton, Ohio and Montgomery County since 1966 and now consists Jefferson Township and of portions of Dayton and Trotwood. It is one-third of the 5th Senate district. It has a Cook PVI of D+29.

Representative	Party	Term	Notes
Before 1967, seats were apportioned by county.
C.J. McLin	Democratic	January 3, 1967 – December 12, 1988	McLin died in 1988 while in office.
Rhine McLin	Democratic	January 3, 1989 – December 31, 1994	McLin did not seek re-election in 1994 and instead won election to the Ohio Senate.
Lloyd Lewis Jr.	Democratic	January 3, 1995 – January 4, 1998	Lewis resigned in 1998 after election to the Dayton City Commission.
Dixie Allen	Republican	January 6, 1998 – June 27, 2006	Allen was a Democrat from 1998 to 2006 and resigned after appointment as a county commissioner.
Clayton Luckie	Democratic	November 14, 2006-January 2013	Luckie did not seek re-election in 2012 after facing corruption charges.
Fred Strahorn	Democratic	January 6, 2013 – present	Incumbent

== 40th district ==
The 40th district has been based in Dayton, Ohio and Montgomery County since 1972 and now consists of Butler Township, Englewood, Huber Heights, Phillipsburg, Union, Vandalia, Verona, Wayne Township and portions of Clayton, Clay Township, Dayton, Harrison Township and Riverside. It is one-third of the 6th Senate district. It has a Cook PVI of R+7.

Representative	Party	Term	Notes
Before 1967, seats were apportioned by county.
Larry Christman	Democratic	January 3, 1973 – December 31, 1980	Christman lost re-election in 1980 to Russ Guerra.
Russ Guerra	Republican	January 3, 1981 – April 19, 1992	Guerra died in 1992 while in office.
Jeff Jacobson	Republican	June 17, 1992 – December 31, 2000	Jacobson was term-limited in 2000 and won election to the Ohio Senate.
Arlene Setzer	Republican	January 3, 2001 – December 31, 2008	Setzer was term-limited in 2008.
Seth Morgan	Republican	January 5, 2009 – December 31, 2010	Morgan did not seek re-election in 2010 and instead ran for Ohio State Auditor.
Michael Henne	Republican	January 3, 2011 – present	Incumbent

== 41st district ==
The 41st district has been based in Dayton, Ohio and Montgomery County since 1966 and now consists of Centerville, Kettering, Oakwood and portions of Dayton and Riverside. It is one-third of the 6th Senate district. It has a Cook PVI of R+8.

Representative	Party	Term	Notes
Before 1967, seats were apportioned by county.
Robert Roderer	Democratic	January 3, 1955 – December 31, 1968	Roderer did not seek re-election in 1968.
Tony P. Hall	Democratic	January 3, 1969 – December 31, 1972	Hall did not seek re-election and instead won election to the Ohio Senate.
Paul Leonard	Democratic	January 3, 1973 – December 31, 1980	Leonard did not seek re-election in 1980.
Larry Balweg	Republican	January 3, 1981 – December 31, 1982	Ballweg lost re-election in 1982 to Bob Hickey.
Bob Hickey	Democratic	January 3, 1983 – December 31, 1992	Hickey did not seek re-election in 1992.
Don Mottley	Republican	January 3, 1993 – December 31, 2000	Mottley was term-limited in 2000.
Jon Husted	Republican	January 3, 2001 – December 31, 2008	Husted was term-limited in 2008 and won election to the Ohio Senate.
Peggy Lehner	Republican	January 5, 2009 – January 8, 2011	Lehner resigned upon her appointment to the Ohio Senate.
Jim Butler	Republican	January 11, 2011 – present	Incumbent

== 42nd district ==
The 42nd district has been based in Dayton, Ohio and Montgomery County since 1966 and now consists of Carlisle, German Township, Germantown, Miamisburg, Miami Township, Moraine, Springboro, Washington Township and West Carrollton. It is one-third of the 6th Senate district. It has a Cook PVI of R+12.

Representative	Party	Term	Notes
Before 1967, seats were apportioned by county.
Albert Sealy	Republican	January 3, 1967 – December 31, 1968	Sealy did not seek re-election in 1968.
Fred Young	Republican	January 3, 1969 – December 31, 1976	Young lost the party re-nomination in 1976 to Bob Corbin.
Bob Corbin	Republican	January 2, 1977 – December 31, 2000	Corbin was term-limited in 2000.
John White	Republican	January 3, 2001 – December 31, 2008	White was term-limited in 2008.
Terry Blair	Republican	January 5, 2009 – June 26, 2014	Blair died in 2014 while in office.
Niraj Antani	Republican	December 2, 2014 – present	Incumbent

== 43rd district ==
The 43rd district has been based in Dayton, Ohio and Montgomery County since 1966 and now consists of all of Preble County and Farmersville, New Lebanon, Brookville, Trotwood, Clayton, Harrison Township, Perry Township, Jackson Township, and portions of Dayton. It is one-third of the 5th Senate district. It has a Cook PVI of D+3.

Representative	Party	Term	Notes
Before 1967, seats were apportioned by county.
David Albritton	Republican	January 3, 1961 – December 31, 1972	Albritton lost re-election in 1972 to Ed Orlett.
Ed Orlett	Democratic	January 3, 1973 – January 8, 1986	Orlett resigned in 1986 to serve as Montgomery County Clerk of Courts.
Tom Roberts	Democratic	January 8, 1986 – December 31, 2000	Roberts was term-limited in 2000.
Fred Strahorn	Democratic	January 3, 2001 – December 31, 2008	Strahorn was term-limited in 2008.
Roland Winburn	Democratic	January 5, 2009 – December 31, 2014	Winburn lost re-election in 2014 to Jeff Rezabek.
Jeff Rezabek	Republican	January 6, 2015 – present	Incumbent

== 44th district ==
The 44th district has been based in Toledo, Ohio and Lucas County since 1966 and now consists of portions of Toledo. It is one-third of the 11th Senate district. It has a Cook PVI of D+30.

Representative	Party	Term	Notes
Before 1967, seats were apportioned by county.
James Holzemer	Democratic	January 3, 1965 – December 31, 1968	Holzemer did not seek re-election in 1968 and instead won election as Lucas County Commissioner.
Casey Jones	Democratic	January 3, 1969 – December 31, 1994	Jones did not seek re-election in 1994.
Jack Ford	Democratic	January 3, 1995 – December 31, 2001	Ford resigned in 2001 after winning election as Mayor of Toledo, Ohio
Edna Brown	Democratic	January 8, 2002 – December 31, 2010	Brown was term-limited in 2010 and won election to the Ohio Senate.
Michael Ashford	Democratic	January 3, 2011 – present	Incumbent

== 45th district ==
The 45th district has been based in Toledo, Ohio and Lucas County since 1966 and now consists of Washington Township and portions of Toledo and Sylvania Township. It is one-third of the 11th Senate district. It has a Cook PVI of D+14.

Representative	Party	Term	Notes
Before 1967, seats were apportioned by county.
Marigene Valiquette	Democratic	January 3, 1963 – January 13, 1969	Valiquette resigned in 1969 to take a seat in the Ohio Senate.
Arthur Wilkowski	Democratic	January 15, 1969 – July 19, 1983	Wilkowski resigned prior to the expiration of his term.
Don Czarcinski	Democratic	November 30, 1983 – December 31, 1992	Czarcinski lost re-election in 1992 to Sally Perz.
Sally Perz	Republican	January 3, 1993 – September 14, 1999	Perz resigned to take a position with the University of Toledo.
Jim Mettler	Republican	October 20, 1999 – December 31, 2000	Mettler lost re-election in 2000 to Teresa Fedor.
Teresa Fedor	Democratic	January 3, 2001 – December 31, 2002	Fedor did not seek re-election in 2002 and instead won election to the Ohio Senate.
Peter Ujvagi	Democratic	January 3, 2003 – March 17, 2010	Ujvagi resigned in 2010 to become Lucas County Administrator.
Joe Walter	Democratic	March 24, 2010 – December 31, 2010	Walter did not seek election in 2010.
Teresa Fedor	Democratic	January 3, 2011 – present	Incumbent

== 46th district ==
The 46th district has been based in Toledo, Ohio and Lucas County since 1966 and now consists of Maumee, Springfield Township, Jerusalem Township, Holland, Oregon and portions of Toledo. It is one-third of the 11th Senate district. It has a Cook PVI of D+8.

Representative	Party	Term	Notes
Before 1967, seats were apportioned by county.
Barney Quilter	Democratic	January 3, 1967 – December 31, 1994	Quilter did not seek re-election in 1994.
John Garcia	Republican	January 3, 1995 – December 31, 1998	Garcia lost re-election in 1998 to Jeanine Perry.
Jeanine Perry	Democratic	January 5, 1999 – December 31, 2006	Perry was term-limited in 2006.
Matt Szollosi	Democratic	January 2, 2007 – May 31, 2013	Szollosi resigned to take a position with the Affiliated Building Trades.
Michael Sheehy	Democratic	June 16, 2013 – present	Incumbent

== 47th district ==
The 47th district has been based in Toledo, Ohio and Lucas County since 1966 and now consists of portions of Lucas County including Berkey, Ottawa Hills, Swanton, Sylvania, Waterville and Whitehouse and portions of Fulton County including Archbold, Fayette, Metamora, and Wauseon.

It is one-third of the 2nd Senate district. It has a Cook PVI of R+6.

Representative	Party	Term	Notes
Before 1967, seats were apportioned by county.
John Galbraith	Republican	January 3, 1967 – December 31, 1986	Galbraith lost re-election in 1986 to Arlene Singer.
Arlene Singer	Democratic	January 2, 1987 – December 31, 1988	Singer lost re-election in 1988 to Tim Greenwood.
Tim Greenwood	Republican	January 3, 1989 – January 4, 1995	Greenwood resigned in 1995 to take a seat in the Ohio Senate.
Lynn Olman	Republican	January 4, 1995 – December 31, 2004	Olman was term-limited in 2004.
Mark Wagoner	Republican	January 3, 2005 – January 15, 2008	Wagoner resigned in 2008 to take a seat in the Ohio Senate.
Barbara Sears	Republican	January 15, 2008 – June 29, 2016	Sears resigned in 2016 to take a position under Ohio Governor John Kasich.
Derek Merrin	Republican	August 2, 2016 – present	Incumbent

== 48th district ==
The 48th district has been based in Canton, Ohio and Stark County since 1966 and now consists of Hills and Dales, Jackson Township, Meyers Lake, Navarre, North Canton and portions of Bethlehem, Perry, Canton and Plain Townships.

It is one-third of the 29th Senate district. It has a Cook PVI of R+2.

Representative	Party	Term	Notes
Before 1967, seats were apportioned by county.
Robert Levitt	Republican	January 3, 1963 – December 31, 1974	Levitt did not seek reelection in 1974,
David Johnson	Republican	January 3, 1975 – December 31, 1976	Johnson did not seek re-election in 1976 and instead ran for the Ohio Senate.
John Kellogg	Republican	January 3, 1977 – December 31, 1978	Kellogg did not seek re-election in 1978.
David Johnson	Republican	January 3, 1979 – April 15, 1993	Johnson resigned to become a PUCO commissioner.
Kirk Schuring	Republican	January 3, 1995 – December 31, 2002	Schuring was term-limited in 2002 and won election to the Ohio Senate.
Scott Oelslager	Republican	January 3, 2003 – December 31, 2010	Oelslager was term-limited in 2010 and won election to the Ohio Senate.
Kirk Schuring	Republican	January 3, 2011 – present	Incumbent

== 49th district ==
The 49th district has been based in Canton, Ohio and Stark County since 1966 and now consists of Canton, East Sparta, Pike Township and portions of Massillon and Canton, Osnaburg, Perry, Plain and Tuscarawas Townships.

It is one-third of the 29th Senate district. It has a Cook PVI of D+13.

Representative	Party	Term	Notes
Before 1967, seats were apportioned by county.
James Thorpe	Republican	January 3, 1967 – December 31, 1974	Thorpe lost reelection in 1974 to William J. Healy.
William J. Healy	Democratic	January 3, 1975 – December 31, 2000	Healy was term-limited in 2000.
Mary Cirelli	Democratic	January 3, 2001 – December 31, 2004	Cirelli lost the party renomination to William J. Healy II.
William J. Healy II	Democratic	January 3, 2005 – December 12, 2007	Healy resigned after winning election as Mayor of Canton.
Stephen Slesnick	Democratic	March 11, 2008 – December 31, 2016	Slesnick was term-limited in 2016.
Tom West	Democratic	January 3, 2017 – present	Incumbent

== 50th district ==
The 50th district has been based in Canton, Ohio and Stark County since 1966 and now consists of Alliance, East Canton, Hartville, Limaville, Louisville, Magnolia, Minerva, Waynesburg, Lake, Lexington, Marlboro, Nimishillen, Paris, Sandy and Washington Townships and portions of Osnaburg and Plain Townships.

It is one-third of the 29th Senate district. It has a Cook PVI of R+4.

Representative	Party	Term	Notes
Before 1967, seats were apportioned by county.
Michael Gamble	Democratic	January 3, 1967 – December 31, 1968	Gamble did not seek re-election in 1968.
Ross Heintzelman	Republican	January 3, 1969 – December 31, 1972	Heintzelman lost re-election in 1972 to Irene Smart.
Irene Smart	Democratic	January 3, 1973 – January 3, 1978	Smart resigned to become a judge.
Robert Regula	Democratic	January 3, 1978 – December 31, 1978	Regula lost re-election in 1978 to Chuck Red Ash.
Chuck Red Ash	Republican	January 3, 1979 – December 31, 1990	Ash lost re-election in 1990 to Johnnie Maier Jr.
Johnnie Maier Jr.	Democratic	January 3, 1991 – December 31, 1999	Maier resigned after winning election as Massillon Clerk of Courts.
Mike Stevens	Democratic	January 11, 2000 – December 31, 2000	Stevens lost re-election in 2000 to John Hagan.
John Hagan	Republican	January 3, 2001 – December 31, 2008	Hagan was term-limited in 2008.
Todd Snitchler	Republican	January 5, 2009 – January 21, 2011	Snitchler resigned following appointment as Chairman of the Public Utilities Commission.
Christina Hagan	Republican	February 3, 2011 – present	Incumbent

== 51st district ==
The 51st district has been based in Butler County since 1966 and now consists of Fairfield, Hamilton, Ross Township and portions of Fairfield, Hanover and St. Clair Townships. It is one-third of the 4th Senate district. It has a Cook PVI of R+10.

Representative	Party	Term	Notes
Before 1967, seats were apportioned by county.
Thomas Rentschler	Republican	January 3, 1967 – December 31, 1970	Rentschler did not seek re-election in 1970.
Tom Kindness	Republican	January 3, 1971 – December 31, 1974	Kindness did not seek re-election in 1974 and instead won election to the United States Congress.
Michael A. Fox	Republican	January 3, 1975 – October 14, 1997	Fox resigned in 1997 to become a Butler County Commissioner.
Greg Jolivette	Republican	October 15, 1997 – January 16, 2004	Jolivette resigned in 2004 to become a Butler County Commissioner.
Courtney Combs	Republican	January 21, 2004 – present	Combs was term-limited in 2012.
Wes Retherford	Republican	January 6, 2013 – present	Incumbent

== 52nd district ==
The 52nd district has been based in Butler County since 1966 and now consists of Sharonville, Liberty Township, West Chester Township and portions of Fairfield Township. It is one-third of the 4th Senate district. It has a Cook PVI of R+19.

The district was represented by United States Speaker of the House John Boehner from 1985 to 1990.

Representative	Party	Term	Notes
Before 1967, seats were apportioned by county.
Barry Levey	Republican	January 3, 1963 – December 31, 1970	Levey did not seek re-election in 1970.
David Armbruster	Democratic	January 3, 1971 – December 31, 1972	Armbruster lost re-election in 1972 to Bill Donham.
Bill Donham	Republican	January 3, 1973 – December 31, 1984	Donham did not seek re-election in 1984.
John Boehner	Republican	January 3, 1985 – December 31, 1990	Boehner did not seek re-election in 1990 and instead won election to the United States Congress.
Scott Nein	Republican	January 3, 1991 – July 11, 1995	Nein resigned following his appointment to the Ohio Senate in 1995.
Gary Cates	Republican	October 5, 1995 – December 31, 2004	Cates was term-limited in 2004 and won election in the Ohio Senate.
Bill Coley	Republican	January 3, 2005 – May 24, 2011	Coley resigned following his appointment to the Ohio Senate in 2011.
Margaret Conditt	Republican	May 25, 2011 – September 8, 2017	Conditt resigned to spend more time with her family.
George Lang	Republican	September 13, 2017 – present	Incumbent

== 53rd district ==
The 53rd district has been based in Butler County since 1992 and now consists of College Corner, Jacksonburg, Millville, Monroe, Morgan Township, New Miami, Oxford, Oxford Township, Reilly Township, Seven Mile, Somerville, Trenton, Wayne and portions of Middletown, Hanover and St. Clair Townships. It is one-third of the 4th Senate district. It has a Cook PVI of R+10.

Representative	Party	Term	Notes
Gene Krebs	Republican	January 3, 1993 – December 31, 2000	Krebs was term-limited in 2000.
Shawn Webster	Republican	January 3, 2001 – December 31, 2008	Webster was term-limited in 2008.
Timothy Derickson	Republican	January 5, 2009 – August 21, 2016	Derickson resigned in 2016 to take a position under Ohio Governor John Kasich.
Candice Keller	Republican	November 16, 2016 – present	Incumbent

== 54th district ==
The 54th district has always been based in southwestern Ohio, and now comprises portions of Warren County including Lebanon, Mason and Monroe and portions of Butler County including part of Middletown.

It makes up one-third of the 7th Senate district. It has a Cook PVI of R+13.

Representative	Party	Term	Notes
Before 1967, seats were apportioned by county.
Corwin Nixon	Republican	January 3, 1963 – December 31, 1992	Nixon did not seek re-election in 1992.
George E. Terwilleger	Republican	January 5, 1993 – December 31, 2000	Terwilleger was term-limited in 2000.
Tom Raga	Republican	January 5, 2001 – December 31, 2006	Raga ran for Ohio Lieutenant Governor in 2006.
Shannon Jones	Republican	January 2, 2007 – August 10, 2009	Jones resigned to take a seat in the Ohio Senate.
Peter Beck	Republican	September 20, 2009 – November 30, 2014	Beck resigned due to felony charges.
Paul Zeltwanger	Republican	January 5, 2015 – present	Incumbent

== 55th district ==
The 55th district has always been based in Elyria, Ohio, and now comprises portions of Lorain County including Avon Lake, Elyria, Grafton, Sheffield and portions of North Ridgeville.

It makes up one-third of the 13th Senate district. It has a Cook PVI of D+3.

Representative	Party	Term	Notes
Before 1967, seats were apportioned by county.
Henry Schriver	Republican	January 3, 1967 – December 31, 1968	Schriver did not seek re-election in 1968.
Don Pease	Democratic	January 3, 1969 – December 31, 1974	Pease did not seek re-election in 1974 and won election to the Ohio Senate.
Scribner Fauver	Republican	January 3, 1975 – December 31, 1978	Fauver did not seek re-election in 1978 and ran for the Ohio Senate.
John Bara	Democratic	January 3, 1979 – December 31, 1980	Bara lost re-election in 1980 to Marguerite Bowman.
Marguerite Bowman	Republican	January 3, 1981 – December 31, 1982	Bowman lost re-election in 1982 to John Bara.
John Bara	Democratic	January 3, 1983 – December 31, 1992	Bara did not seek re-election in 1992.
John Bender	Democratic	January 3, 1993 – December 31, 2000	Bender was term-limited in 2000.
Jeffrey Manning	Republican	January 3, 2001 – March 4, 2003	Manning resigned to become Lorain County Prosecutor.
Earl Martin	Republican	April 8, 2003 – December 31, 2006	Martin lost re-election in 2006 to Matt Lundy.
Matt Lundy	Democratic	January 2, 2007 – December 31, 2014	Lundy was term-limited in 2014 and won election as Lorain County Commissioner.
Nathan Manning	Republican	January 6, 2015 – present	Incumbent

== 56th district ==
The 55th district has always been based in Lorain, Ohio, and now comprises portions of Lorain County including Amherst, Kipton, Lorain, Oberlin, Sheffield Lake, South Amherst and Vermilion.

It makes up one-third of the 13th Senate district. It has a Cook PVI of D+15.

Representative	Party	Term	Notes
Before 1967, seats were apportioned by county.
Ed DeChant	Democratic	January 3, 1949 – December 31, 1968	DeChant did not seek re-election in 1968.
Leo Camera	Democratic	January 3, 1969 – November 8, 1982.	Camera resigned prior to the expiration of his term in 1982.
Michael Camera	Democratic	November 8, 1982 – December 31, 1984	Camera lost the party renomination in 1984 to Joseph Koziura.
Joseph Koziura	Democratic	January 3, 1985 – December 31, 1995	Koziura resigned following his election as mayor of Lorain.
Dan Metelsky	Democratic	January 9, 1996 – October 17, 2001	Metelsky resigned to become deputy director for the Ohio Lottery Commission.
Joseph Koziura	Democratic	October 30, 2001 – December 31, 2010	Koziura was term-limited in 2010.
Dan Ramos	Democratic	January 3, 2011 – present	Incumbent

== 57th district ==
The 57th district has been based in northern Ohio, and now comprises Huron County and portions of Lorain County including Avon, LaGrange, Rochester, Wellington and portions of North Ridgeville.

It makes up one-third of the 13th Senate district. It has a Cook PVI of R+4.

Representative	Party	Term	Notes
Before 1967, seats were apportioned by county.
Ethel Swanbeck	Republican	January 3, 1955 – December 31, 1976	Swanbeck did not seek re-election in 1976.
Marie Tansey	Republican	January 3, 1977 – December 31, 1988	Tansey did not seek re-election in 1988.
Katherine Walsh	Democratic	January 3, 1989 – December 31, 1994	Walsh lost re-election in 1994 to Bill Taylor.
Bill Taylor	Republican	January 3, 1995 – December 31, 2000	Taylor did not seek re-election in 2000.
J. Tom Lendrum	Republican	January 3, 2001 – December 31, 2002	Lendrum re-districted and lost re-election against Rep. Chris Redfern.
Kathleen Walcher Reed	Republican	January 3, 2003 – May 25, 2006	Walcher Reed resigned prior to the expiration of her term in 2006.
Dan White	Republican	May 25, 2006 – December 31, 2006	White lost re-election to Matt Barrett in 2006.
Matt Barrett	Democratic	January 2, 2007 – April 21, 2008	Barrett resigned following a sex scandal.
Tom Heydinger	Democratic	May 21, 2008 – December 31, 2008	Heydinger did not seek re-election in 2008.
Terry Boose	Republican	January 5, 2009 – December 31, 2016	Boose was term-limited in 2016.
Dick Stein	Republican	January 3, 2017 – present	Incumbent

== 58th district ==
The 58th district has been based in Mahoning County since 1966 and now consists of Campbell, Coitsville Township, Lowellville, Struthers, Youngstown, and portions of Austintown. It is one-third of the 33rd Senate district. It has a Cook PVI of D+29.

Representative	Party	Term	Notes
Before 1967, seats were apportioned by county.
Tom Gilmartin	Democratic	January 3, 1967 – December 31, 1968	Gilmartin did not seek re-election in 1968.
John V. McCarthy	Democratic	January 3, 1969 – December 31, 1972	McCarthy did not seek re-election in 1972.
Tom Gilmartin	Democratic	January 3, 1973 – December 31, 1986	Gilmartin lost the party renomination in 1986 to Bob Hagan.
Bob Hagan	Democratic	January 2, 1987 – February 8, 1997	Hagan resigned after being appointed to the Ohio Senate.
Sylvester Patton	Democratic	February 8, 1997 – December 31, 2006	Patton was term-limited in 2006.
Bob Hagan	Democratic	January 2, 2007 – December 31, 2014	Hagan was term-limited in 2014.
Michele Lepore-Hagan	Democratic	January 6, 2015 – present	Incumbent

== 59th district ==
The 59th district has been based in Mahoning County since 1966 and now includes Beloit, Boardman Township, Canfield, Columbiana, Craig Beach, New Middletown, Poland, Salem, Sebring, Washingtonville and portions of Austintown.

It is one-third of the 33rd Senate district. It has a Cook PVI of D+7.

Representative	Party	Term	Notes
Before 1967, seats were apportioned by county.
Walter Paulo	Democratic	January 3, 1967 – December 31, 1972	Paulo did not seek re-election in 1972.
Tom Carney	Democratic	January 3, 1973 – February 10, 1982	Carney resigned to become Mahoning County Commissioner.
Ron Gerberry	Democratic	February 11, 1982 – December 31, 2000	Gerberry was term-limited in 2000.
Kenneth Carano	Democratic	January 3, 2001 – April 21, 2007	Carano resigned to become a regional representative for Governor Ted Strickland.
Ron Gerberry	Democratic	May 21, 2007 – August 21, 2015	Gerberry resigned following campaign-finance violations.
John Boccieri	Democratic	September 29, 2015 – present	Incumbent

== 60th district ==
The 60th district has been based in Lake County since 1966 and now includes Eastlake, Fairport Harbor, Grand River, Lakeline, Mentor-on-the-Lake, Painesville, Timberlake, Wickliffe, Willoughby and Willowick.

It is one-third of the 25th Senate district. It has a Cook PVI of D+4.

Representative	Party	Term	Notes
Before 1967, seats were apportioned by county.
Joe Tulley	Republican	January 3, 1967 – December 31, 1976	Tulley did not seek re-election in 1976.
Ed Hughes	Democratic	January 3, 1977 – December 31, 1982	Hughes did not seek re-election in 1982.
Dan Troy	Democratic	January 3, 1982 – December 31, 1996	Troy did not seek re-election in 1996 and instead ran for the Ohio Senate.
Jamie Callender	Republican	January 3, 1997 – December 31, 2004	Callender was term-limited in 2004.
Lorraine Fende	Democratic	January 3, 2005 – December 31, 2012	Fende was term-limited in 2012.
John Rogers	Democratic	January 6, 2013 – present	Incumbent

== 61st district ==
The 61st district has been based in Lake County since 1982 and now includes Kirtland, Kirtland Hills, Madison, North Perry, Perry, Waite Hill and Willoughby Hills.

It is one-third of the 18th Senate district. It has a Cook PVI of R+5.

Representative	Party	Term	Notes
Before 1967, seats were apportioned by county.
Robert Hagan	Democratic	January 3, 1983 – December 31, 1988	Hagan did not seek re-election in 1988.
Ray Sines	Republican	January 3, 1989 – December 31, 1996	Sines lost the party renomination in 1996 to Ron Young.
Ron Young	Republican	January 3, 1997 – December 31, 2004	Young was term-limited in 2004.
Timothy J. Cassell	Democratic	January 3, 2005 – December 31, 2006	Cassell lost re-election in 2006 to Carol-Ann Schindel.
Carol-Ann Schindel	Republican	January 2, 2007 – December 31, 2008	Schindel lost re-election in 2008 to Mark Schneider.
Mark Schneider	Democratic	January 5, 2009 – December 31, 2010	Schneider lost re-election in 2010 to Ron Young.
Ron Young	Republican	January 3, 2011 – present	Incumbent

== 62nd district ==
The 62nd district has been based in suburban Cincinnati since 1966 and now includes portions of Warren County including Blanchester, Butlerville, Carlisle, Corwin, Franklin, Harveysburg, Loveland, Middletown, Morrow, Pleasant Plain, South Lebanon, Springboro and Waynesville.

It is one-third of the 7th Senate district. It has a Cook PVI of R+13.

Representative	Party	Term	Notes
Before 1967, seats were apportioned by county.
W. Ray Cadwallader	Republican	January 3, 1965 – December 31, 1968	Cadwallader did not seek re-election in 1968.
Dale Schmidt	Republican	January 3, 1969 – December 31, 1972	Schmidt did not seek re-election in 1972.
Jim Luken	Democratic	January 3, 1973 – December 31, 1975	Luken resigned after winning election as Mayor of Cincinnati.
Terry Tranter	Democratic	January 3, 1977 – December 31, 1992	Tranter was redistricted and lost re-election to Rep. Dale Van Vyven.
Bob Schuler	Republican	January 3, 1993 – December 31, 2000	Schuler was term-limited in 2000.
Michelle G. Schneider	Republican	January 3, 2001 – December 31, 2008	Schneider was term-limited in 2008.
Ron Maag	Republican	January 5, 2009 – December 31, 2016	Maag was term-limited in 2016.
Scott Lipps	Republican	January 3, 2017 – present	Incumbent

== 63rd district ==
The 63rd district has been based in Trumbull County since 1966 and now consists of Cortland, Girard, Hubbard, Lordstown, McDonald, Newton Falls, Niles, Orangeville, Yankee Lake and Youngstown.

It is one-third of the 32nd Senate district. It has a Cook PVI of D+17.

Representative	Party	Term	Notes
Before 1967, seats were apportioned by county.
James B. Hagan	Democratic	January 3, 1967 – December 31, 1968	Hagan did not seek re-election in 1968.
Michael Del Bane	Democratic	January 3, 1969 – December 31, 1979	Del Bane resigned to become a member of the Ohio Public Utilities Commission.
Joe Williams	Democratic	January 3, 1980 – December 31, 1986	Williams did not seek re-election in 1986.
June Lucas	Democratic	January 2, 1987 – December 31, 2000	Lucas was term-limited in 2000.
Anthony Latell Jr.	Democratic	January 3, 2001 – December 31, 2002	Latell did not seek re-election in 2002.
Sandra Harwood	Democratic	January 3, 2003 – December 31, 2010	Harwood was term-limited in 2010.
Sean O'Brien	Democratic	January 3, 2011 – December 31, 2016	O'Brien did not seek re-election and instead ran for the Ohio Senate.
Glenn Holmes	Democratic	January 3, 2017 – present	Incumbent

== 64th district ==
The 64th district has been based in Trumbull County since 1966 and now consists of portions of Trumbull County including Warren and West Farmington and portions of Ashtabula County including Andover and Orwell.

It is one-third of the 32nd Senate district. It has a Cook PVI of D+14.

Representative	Party	Term	Notes
Before 1967, seats were apportioned by county.
Margaret Dennison	Republican	January 3, 1963 – December 31, 1968	Dennison did not seek re-election in 1968.
Larry Nord	Republican	January 3, 1969 – December 31, 1970	Nord lost re-election in 1970 to Bob Nader.
Bob Nader	Democratic	January 3, 1971 – December 31, 1982	Nader did not seek re-election in 1982.
Michael G. Verich	Democratic	January 3, 1983 – December 8, 1998	Verich resigned after his appointment to the State Employment Relations Board.
Chris Verich	Democratic	December 8, 1998 – December 31, 2000	Verich lost the party nomination to Daniel Sferra.
Daniel Sferra	Democratic	January 3, 2001 – December 31, 2004	Sferra lost re-election to Randy Law.
Randy Law	Republican	January 3, 2005 – December 31, 2006	Law lost re-election to Tom Letson.
Tom Letson	Democratic	January 2, 2007 – December 31, 2014	Letson was term-limited in 2014 and ran for the Ohio Supreme Court.
Michael O'Brien	Democratic	January 6, 2015 – present	Incumbent

== 65th district ==
The 65th district has been based in Clermont County since 1982 and now consists of portions of Clermont County including Loveland, Milford, Newtonsville and Owensville.

It is one-third of the 14th Senate district. It has a Cook PVI of R+18.

Representative	Party	Term	Notes
Sue Fisher	Republican	January 3, 1983 – October 26, 1983	Fisher was killed in 1983 while in office.
Sam Bateman	Republican	January 10, 1984 – December 31, 2000	Bateman was term-limited in 2000.
Jean Schmidt	Republican	January 3, 2001 – December 31, 2004	Schmidt did not run for re-election in 2004 and instead ran for the Ohio Senate.
Joe Uecker	Republican	January 3, 2005 – December 31, 2012	Uecker was term-limited in 2012 and won election to the Ohio Senate.
John Becker	Republican	January 6, 2013 – present	Incumbent

== 66th district ==
The 66th district has been based in Brown County since 1992 and now consists of all of Brown County portions of Clermont County including Amelia, Batavia, Bethel, Chilo, Felicity, Moscow, Neville, New Richmond and Williamsburg.

It is one-third of the 14th Senate district. It has a Cook PVI of R+14.

Representative	Party	Term	Notes
Rose Vesper	Republican	January 3, 1993 – December 31, 2000	Vesper was term-limited in 2000.
Tom Niehaus	Republican	January 3, 2001 – December 31, 2004	Niehaus did not seek re-election in 2004 and won election to the Ohio Senate.
Danny Bubp	Republican	January 3, 2005 – December 31, 2012	Bubp was term-limited in 2012.
Doug Green	Republican	January 6, 2013 – present	Incumbent

== 67th district ==
The 67th district has always been based in central Ohio, and now comprises portions of Delaware County including Ashley, Delaware, Dublin, Ostrander, Powell and Shawnee Hills.

It makes up one-third of the 19th Senate district. It has a Cook PVI of R+14.

Representative	Party	Term	Notes
Before 1967, seats were apportioned by county.
Chuck Fry	Republican	January 3, 1965 – December 31, 1974	Fry ran for Ohio Governor in 1974.
Charles R. Saxbe	Republican	January 3, 1975 – December 31, 1982	Saxbe for Ohio Attorney General in 1982.
Joan Lawrence	Republican	January 3, 1983 – December 31, 2000	Lawrence was term-limited in 2000.
Jon Peterson	Republican	January 3, 2001 – December 31, 2008	Peterson was term-limited in 2008.
Kris Jordan	Republican	January 5, 2009 – December 31, 2010	Jordan did not seek re-election in 2008 and instead won election to the Ohio Senate.
Andrew Brenner	Republican	January 3, 2011 – present	Incumbent

== 68th district ==
The 68th district has always been based in central Ohio, and now comprises Knox County and portions of Delaware County including Columbus, Galena, Sunbury and Westerville.

It makes up one-third of the 19th Senate district. It has a Cook PVI of R+14.

Representative	Party	Term	Notes
Before 1967, seats were apportioned by county.
Kenneth Creasy	Republican	January 3, 1959 – December 31, 1972	Creasy did not seek re-election in 1972.
Harry Turner	Republican	January 3, 1973 – December 31, 1984	Turner did not seek re-election in 1984.
Tom Van Meter	Republican	January 3, 1985 – December 31, 1986	Van Meter did not seek re-election in 1986 and instead ran for the Ohio Senate.
Eugene Byers	Republican	January 2, 1987 – December 31, 1994	Byers did not seek re-election in 1994.
Bill Harris	Republican	January 3, 1995 – August 15, 2000	Harris resigned following his appointment to the Ohio Senate.
Thom Collier	Republican	September 15, 2000 – December 31, 2008	Collier was term-limited in 2008.
Margaret Ruhl	Republican	January 5, 2009 – December 31, 2016	Ruhl was term-limited in 2016.
Rick Carfagna	Republican	January 3, 2017 – present	Incumbent

== 69th district ==
The 69th district has always been based in Medina, and now comprises portions of Medina County including Chippewa Lake, Creston, Gloria Glens Park, Lodi, Medina, Wadsworth, Seville and Westfield Center. It makes up one-third of the 22nd Senate district. It has a Cook PVI of R+7.

Speaker of the House William G. Batchelder represented the district for much of the last forty years.

Representative	Party	Term	Notes
Before 1967, seats were apportioned by county.
Dennis Dannley	Republican	January 3, 1961 – December 31, 1968	Dannley did not seek re-election in 1968.
Bill Batchelder	Republican	January 3, 1969 – December 31, 1998	Batchelder did not seek re-election in 1998 and won election to the Medina County Court of Common Pleas.
Chuck Calvert	Republican	January 3, 1999 – December 31, 2006	Calvert was term-limited in 2006.
Bill Batchelder	Republican	January 2, 2007 – present	Batchelder served as Speaker of the House from 2011 to 2014 and was term-limited in 2014.
Steve Hambley	Republican	January 5, 2015 – present	Incumbent.

== 70th district ==
The 70th district is a multi-county district established in 2002 that now consists of all of Ashland County and portions of Holmes County including Holmesville, Loudonville, Millersburg and Nashville and portions of Medina County including Spencer and part of Brunswick.

It is one-third of the 22nd Senate district. It has a Cook PVI of R+7.

Representative	Party	Term	Notes
Bob Gibbs	Republican	January 3, 2003 – December 31, 2008	Gibbs did not seek re-election in 2008 and instead won election to the Ohio Senate.
Dave Hall	Republican	January 5, 2009 – December 31, 2016	Hall was term-limited in 2016.
Darrell Kick	Republican	January 3, 2017 – present	Incumbent

== 71st district ==
The 71st district has been based in Licking County since 1966 and now consists of Bennington, Burlington, Eden, Granville, Hartford, Heath, Jersey, Liberty, McKean, Monroe, New Albany, Newark, Newton, Pataskala, Reynoldsburg, St. Louisville, Utica, Washington and portions of Etna Township and Madison.

It is one-third of the 31st Senate district. It has a Cook PVI of R+8.

Representative	Party	Term	Notes
Before 1967, seats were apportioned by county.
John McDonald	Democratic	January 3, 1965 – December 31, 1970	McDonald did not seek reelection in 1970.
Raymond Luther	Republican	January 3, 1971 – December 31, 1972	Luther lost reelection in 1972 to Eugene Branstool.
Eugene Branstool	Democratic	January 3, 1973 – December 31, 1982	Branstool did not run for reelection in 1982 and instead won election to the Ohio Senate.
Marc Guthrie	Democratic	January 3, 1983 – December 31, 1994	Guthrie lost reelection in 1994 to Jay Hottinger.
Jay Hottinger	Republican	January 3, 1995 – February 20, 1998	Hottinger resigned following appointment to the Ohio Senate.
David R. Evans	Republican	February 20, 1998 – December 31, 2006	Evans was term-limited in 2006.
Jay Hottinger	Republican	January 2, 2007 – December 31, 2014	Hottinger was term-limited in 2014 and won election to the Ohio Senate.
Scott Ryan	Republican	January 6, 2015 – present	Incumbent

== 72nd district ==
The 72nd district is a multi-county district in existence since 1966 that now consists of Coshocton and Perry counties and portions of Licking including Alexandria, Bowling Green Township, Buckeye Lake, Fallsbury, Franklin Township, Gratiot, Hanover Township, Harrison Township, Hebron, Hopewell Township, Kirkersville, Licking Township, Mary Ann Township, Perry Township, St. Albans Township, Union Township and portions of Madison Township and Etna Township.

It is one-third of the 31st Senate district. It has a Cook PVI of R+6. The district was represented by Larry Householder from 1997 to 2004, who served as Speaker of the House from 2001 to 2004.

Representative	Party	Term	Notes
Before 1967, seats were apportioned by county.
Carlton Davidson	Republican	January 3, 1961 – December 31, 1972	Davidson did not seek re-election in 1972.
Claire Ball	Republican	January 3, 1973 – December 31, 1982	Ball lost reelection in 1982 to Jolynn Boster.
Jolynn Boster	Democratic	January 3, 1983 – April 24, 1989	Boster resigned after named chairperson of the Public Utilities Commission of Ohio.
Mary Abel	Democratic	May 9, 1989 – December 31, 1996	Abel lost reelection in 1996 to Larry Householder.
Larry Householder	Republican	January 3, 1997 – December 31, 2004	Householder was term-limited in 2004 after serving as Speaker of the House from 2001 to 2004.
Ron Hood	Republican	January 3, 2005 – December 31, 2006	Hood did not seek re-election in 2006 and instead ran for the Ohio Senate.
Dan Dodd	Democratic	January 2, 2007 – December 31, 2010	Dodd lost re-election in 2010 to Bill Hayes.
Bill Hayes	Republican	January 3, 2011 – December 31, 2016	Hayes did not seek re-election in 2016.
Larry Householder	Republican	January 3, 2017 – June 16th, 2021	
Kevin D. Miller	Republican	June 25th, 2021 - December 31st, 2022	
Gail Pavliga	Republican	January 3rd, 2023 - Incumbent	Incumbent

== 73rd district ==
The 73rd district has been based in Greene County since 1966 and now consists Bath Township, Beavercreek, Beavercreek Township, Bellbrook, Centerville, Clifton, Fairborn, Huber Heights, Kettering, Miami Township, Sugarcreek Township and Yellow Springs. It is one-third of the 10th Senate district. It has a Cook PVI of R+11.

Representative	Party	Term	Notes
Before 1967, seats were apportioned by county.
Herman Ankeney	Republican	January 3, 1953 – December 31, 1968	Ankeney did not seek re-election in 1968.
John Scott	Republican	January 3, 1969 – December 31, 1976	Scott lost re-election in 1976 to Jim Zehner.
Jim Zehner	Democratic	January 3, 1977 – December 31, 1982	Zehner did not seek re-election in 1982.
Bob Doyle	Republican	January 3, 1983 – December 31, 1992	Doyle lost the party renomination in 1992 to Marilyn Reid.
Marilyn Reid	Republican	January 3, 1993 – December 31, 1998	Reid lost the party renomination in 1998 to Steve Austria.
Steve Austria	Republican	January 5, 1999 – December 31, 2000	Austria did not seek re-election in 2000 and instead won election to the Ohio Senate.
Kevin DeWine	Republican	January 3, 2001 – December 31, 2008	DeWine was term-limited in 2008.
Jarrod Martin	Republican	January 5, 2009 – December 31, 2012	Martin lost the party renomination in 2012 to Rick Perales.
Rick Perales	Republican	January 6, 2013 – present	Incumbent

== 74th district ==
The 74th district is a multi-county district that has been based in central Ohio since 1966 and now consists of Madison County and portions of Clark County including Catawba and South Vienna and portions of Greene County including Bowersville, Cedarville, Jamestown, Spring Valley and Xenia.

It is one-third of the 10th Senate district. It has a Cook PVI of R+10.

Representative	Party	Term	Notes
Before 1967, seats were apportioned by county.
Robert Evans	Republican	January 3, 1967 – December 31, 1968	Evans did not seek re-election in 1968.
John Baker	Republican	January 3, 1969 – December 31, 1972	Baker lost re-election in 1972 to David Hartley.
David Hartley	Democraticic	January 3, 1973 – December 31, 2000	Hartley was term-limited in 2000.
Ron Rhine	Democraticic	January 3, 2001 – December 31, 2002	Rhine was redistricted out of the district in 2002.
Chris Widener	Republican	January 3, 2003 – December 31, 2008	Widener did not seek re-election in 2008 and instead won election to the Ohio Senate.
Bob Hackett	Republican	January 5, 2009 – February 23, 2016	Hackett resigned following his appointment to the Ohio Senate.
Bill Dean	Republican	April 12, 2016 – present	Incumbent

== 75th district ==
The 75th district has been based in Portage County since 1966 and now includes Brady Lake, Kent, Mogadore, Ravenna, Streetsboro, Sugar Bush Knolls and Tallmadge.

It is one-third of the 18th Senate district. It has a Cook PVI of D+7.

Representative	Party	Term	Notes
Before 1967, seats were apportioned by county.
Joseph Kainrad	Democratic	January 3, 1963 – December 31, 1968	Kainrad did not run for re-election in 1968.
Anice Johnson	Republican	January 3, 1969 – December 31, 1970	Johnson lost re-election in 1970 to Marcus Roberto.
Marcus Roberto	Democratic	January 3, 1971 – December 31, 1976	Roberto did not seek re-election in 1976 and instead won election to the Ohio Senate.
John A. Begala	Democratic	January 3, 1977 – December 31, 1982	Begala resigned prior to the expiration of his term in 1982.
Paul Jones	Democratic	January 3, 1983 – December 31, 1994	Jones lost re-election in 1994 to Ann Womer Benjamin.
Ann Womer Benjamin	Republican	January 3, 1995 – December 31, 2002	Benjamin was term-limited in 2002 and ran for the United States Congress.
Kathleen Chandler	Democratic	January 3, 2003 – December 31, 2010	Chandler was term-limited in 2010.
Kathleen Clyde	Democratic	January 3, 2011 – present	Incumbent

== 76th district ==
The 76th district has been based in Geauga County since 1966 and now portions of Geauga County including Burton, Hunting Valley, Middlefield and South Russell and portions of Portage County including Aurora, Garrettsville, Hiram, Mantua, and Windham.

It is one-third of the 18th Senate district. It has a Cook PVI of R+7.

Representative	Party	Term	Notes
Before 1967, seats were apportioned by county.
Edwin Hofstetter	Republican	January 3, 1967 – December 31, 1968	Hofstetter did not seek re-election in 1968 and won election to the Ohio Court of Appeals.
Jim Hunt	Republican	January 3, 1969 – December 31, 1970	Hunt lost re-election in 1970 to James Mueller.
James Mueller	Democratic	January 3, 1971 – December 31, 1974	Mueller did not seek re-election in 1974.
Dennis Wojtanowski	Democratic	January 3, 1975 – December 31, 1982	Wojtanowski did not seek re-election in 1982.
Bob Clark	Republican	January 3, 1983 – December 31, 1992	Clark did not seek re-election in 1992.
Diane Grendell	Republican	January 3, 1993 – December 31, 2000	Grendell was term-limited in 2000.
Tim Grendell	Republican	January 3, 2001 – December 31, 2004	Grendell did not seek re-election in 2004 and instead won election to the Ohio Senate.
Matt Dolan	Republican	January 3, 2005 – January 19, 2010	Dolan resigned in 2010 to run for Cuyahoga County Executive.
Richard Hollington	Republican	February 6, 2010 – January 7, 2012	Hollington resigned following his election as mayor of Hunting Valley.
Mary Matheney	Republican	January 8, 2012 – April 16, 2012	Matheney resigned following the party nomination of Matt Lynch in 2012.
Matt Lynch	Republican	April 16, 2012 – December 31, 2014	Lynch did not run for re-election and instead ran for the United States Congress.
Sarah LaTourette	Republican	January 6, 2015 – present	Incumbent

== 77th district ==
The 77th district has been based in Fairfield County since 1966 and now includes Baltimore, Buckeye Lake, Lancaster, and Pickerington.

It is one-third of the 20th Senate district. It has a Cook PVI of R+9.

Representative	Party	Term	Notes
John Weis	Republican	January 3, 1963 – December 31, 1968	Weis lost re-election in 1968 to Don Maddux.
Don Maddux	Democratic	January 3, 1969 – December 31, 1980	Maddox lost re-election in 1980 to Steve Williams.
Steve Williams	Republican	January 3, 1981 – December 31, 1990	Williams ran for the Ohio Senate in 1990.
Jon D. Myers	Republican	January 3, 1991 – December 31, 2000	Myers was term-limited in 2000.
Tim Schaffer	Republican	January 3, 2001 – December 31, 2006	Schaffer did not seek reelection in 2006 and instead won election to the Ohio Senate.
Gerald Stebleton	Republican	January 2, 2007 – December 31, 2014	Stebleton was term-limited in 2014.
Tim Schaffer	Republican	January 6, 2015 – present	Incumbent

== 78th district ==
The 78th district has been based in Hocking County since 2012 and now includes all of Hocking County and Morgan County portions of Pickaway County including Ashville, Circleville, Lockbourne, South Bloomfield and Tarlton, portions of Fairfield County including Amanda, Bremen, Carroll, Lithopolis, Stoutsville, Sugar Grove and Tarlton, portions of Athens County including Glouster, Jacksonville and Trimble and portions Muskingum County including Fultonham, Roseville and South Zanesville.

It is one-third of the 20th Senate district. It has a Cook PVI of R+5.

Representative	Party	Term	Notes
Ron Hood	Republican	January 6, 2013 – present	Incumbent

== 79th district ==
The 79th district has been based in Clark County since 1966 and now consists of Bethel Township, Clifton, Donnelsville, Enon, German Township, Green Township, Madison Township, Mad River Township, New Carlisle, North Hampton, Pike Township, South Charleston, Springfield, Springfield Township, Tremont City and portions of Moorefield Township. It is one-third of the 10th Senate district. It has a Cook PVI of EVEN.

Representative	Party	Term	Notes
Before 1967, seats were apportioned by county.
Joseph Hiestand	Republican	January 3, 1965 – December 31, 1974	Hiestand did not seek re-election in 1974.
Bob McEwen	Republican	January 3, 1975 – December 31, 1980	McEwen did not seek re-election in 1980 and instead won election to the United States Congress.
Joe Haines	Republican	January 3, 1981 – November 4, 1999	Haines resigned to become a deputy agriculture director.
Chris Widener	Republican	December 8, 1999 – December 31, 2000	Widener lost the party nomination in 2000 to Merle G. Kearns.
Merle G. Kearns	Republican	January 3, 2001 – August 25, 2005	Kearns resigned in 2005 to become Director of the Ohio Department of Aging.
Ross McGregor	Republican	October 5, 2005 – December 31, 2014	McGregor was term-limited in 2014.
Kyle Koehler	Republican	January 6, 2015 – present	Incumbent

== 80th district ==
The 80th district has always been based in western Ohio, and now comprises Miami County and portions of Darke County including Arcanum, Bradford, Castine, Gettysburg, Hollansburg, Ithaca, New Madison, Palestine, Pitsburg and Wayne Lakes.

It makes up one-third of the 5th Senate district. It has a Cook PVI of R+15. The district was represented by Bob Netzley, the longest serving member in the history of the Ohio House of Representatives, from 1961 to 2000.

Representative	Party	Term	Notes
Before 1967, seats were apportioned by county.
Bob Netzley	Republican	January 3, 1961 – December 31, 2000	Netzley was term-limited in 2000.
Diana Fessler	Republican	January 3, 2001 – December 31, 2008	Fessler was term-limited in 2008.
Richard Adams	Republican	January 5, 2009 – December 31, 2014	Adams did not seek re-election in 2014.
Steve Huffman	Republican	January 6, 2015 – December 31, 2018	Elected to the Senate seat vacated by Bill Beagle
Jena Powell	Republican	January 7, 2019 – present	Incumbent

== 81st district ==
The 81st district has always been based in northwest Ohio, and now comprises Williams, Henry and Putnam counties, and portions of Fulton County including Delta and Swanton.

It makes up one-third of the 1st Senate district. It has a Cook PVI of R+11.

Representative	Party	Term	Notes
Before 1967, seats were apportioned by county.
Ralph Cole	Republican	January 3, 1955 – March 1, 1968	Cole resigned to become a judge on the Ohio Court of Appeals.
Robert D. Schuck	Republican	March 1, 1968 – December 31, 1972	Schuck lost re-nomination in 1972 to Michael Oxley.
Michael Oxley	Republican	January 3, 1973 – July 15, 1981	Oxley resigned after winning election to Congress.
Charlie Earl	Republican	October 7, 1981 – December 31, 1984	Earl did not seek re-election in 1984.
Lynn Wachtmann	Republican	January 3, 1985 – December 31, 1998	Wachtmann did not seek re-election and instead ran for the Ohio Senate.
Jim Hoops	Republican	January 5, 1999 – December 31, 2006	Hoops was term-limited in 2006.
Lynn Wachtmann	Republican	January 2, 2007 – December 31, 2014	Wachtmann was term-limited in 2014.
Rob McColley	Republican	January 6, 2015 – December 5, 2017	Resigned when we was appointed to the Ohio Senate.
Jim Hoops	Republican	January 17, 2018 – present	Incumbent

== 82nd district ==
The 82nd district has always been based in northwest Ohio, and now comprises Defiance, Paulding and Van Wert counties, and portions of Auglaize County including Buckland, St. Marys and Wapakoneta.

It makes up one-third of the 1st Senate district. It has a Cook PVI of R+10.

Representative	Party	Term	Notes
Before 1967, seats were apportioned by county.
Fred Hadley	Republican	January 3, 1965 – December 31, 1978	Hadley did not seek re-election in 1978.
Larry Manahan	Republican	January 3, 1979 – December 31, 1992	Manahan did not seek re-election in 1992.
Richard Hodges	Republican	January 3, 1993 – December 31, 1998	Hodges did not seek re-election in 1998.
Steve Buehrer	Republican	January 5, 1999 – December 31, 2006	Buehrer was term-limited in 2006 and ran for the Ohio Senate.
Bruce Goodwin	Republican	January 2, 2007 – December 31, 2012	Goodwin did not seek re-election in 2012.
Tony Burkley	Republican	January 6, 2013 – December 31, 2016	Burkley lost re-nomination in 2016 to Craig Reidel.
Craig Reidel	Republican	January 3, 2017 – present	Incumbent

== 83rd district ==
The 83rd district is a multi-county district established in 1982 that now comprises Hancock and Hardin counties and portions of Logan County including Belle Center, Ridgeway, Rushsylvania and West Mansfield.

It makes up one-third of the 1st Senate district. It has a Cook PVI of R+13.

Representative	Party	Term	Notes
Jon Stozich	Republican	January 3, 1983 – February 7, 1991	Stozich resigned after being named Director of the Ohio Department of Industrial Relations.
Chuck Brading	Republican	February 7, 1991 – December 31, 2000	Brading was term-limited in 2000.
Mike Gilb	Republican	January 3, 2001 – December 31, 2006	Gilb did not seek re-election in 2006 and instead ran for the United States Congress.
Cliff Hite	Republican	January 2, 2007 – February 2, 2011	Hite resigned in order to take an appointment to the Ohio Senate.
Robert Sprague	Republican	February 2, 2011 – present	Incumbent

== 84th district ==
The 84th district is a multi-county district established in 1982 that now comprises Mercer county and portions of Auglaize County including Cridersville, Minster, New Bremen, New Knoxville, Uniopolis and Waynesfield, portions of Darke County including Ansonia, Burkettsville, Greenville, New Weston, North Star, Osgood, Rossburg, Union City, Versailles and Yorkshire and portions of Shelby County including Anna, Botkins, Fort Loramie, Jackson Center, Kettlersville and Russia.

It makes up one-third of the 12th Senate district. It has a Cook PVI of R+19, making it the most Republican district in the state.

Representative	Party	Term	Notes
Jim Buchy	Republican	January 3, 1983 – December 31, 2000	Buchy was term-limited in 2000.
Keith Faber	Republican	January 3, 2001 – January 2, 2007	Faber resigned after being appointed to the Ohio Senate.
Jim Zehringer	Republican	February 20, 2007 – January 3, 2011	Zehringer resigned after being named Ohio Director of Agriculture.
Jim Buchy	Republican	January 3, 2011 – December 31, 2016	Buchy did not seek re-election in 2016.
Keith Faber	Republican	January 3, 2017 – present	Incumbent

== 85th district ==
The 85th district is a multi-county district established in 1966 that now comprises Champaign County and portions of Logan County including Bellefontaine, De Graff, Huntsville, Lakeview, Quincy, Russells Point, Valley Hi and Zanesfield and portions of Shelby County including Lockington, Port Jefferson and Sidney.

It makes up one-third of the 12th Senate district. It has a Cook PVI of R+12. From 2001 to 2006, the district was represented by Derrick Seaver, who at 18 was the youngest member ever elected to the Ohio House of Representatives.

Representative	Party	Term	Notes
Before 1967, seats were apportioned by county.
Vaughn Stocksdale	Democratic	January 3, 1967 – December 31, 1968	Stocksdale did not seek re-election in 1968.
Jack P. Oliver	Republican	January 3, 1969 – December 31, 1972	Oliver lost re-election in 1972 to Dale Locker.
Dale Locker	Democratic	January 3, 1973 – November 12, 1982	Locker resigned to become director of the Ohio Department of Agriculture.
Walter Fortener	Democratic	February 3, 1983 – December 31, 1984	Fortener lost re-election in 1984 to Jim Davis.
Jim Davis	Republican	January 3, 1985 – December 31, 1994	Davis did not seek re-election in 1994.
Jim Jordan	Republican	January 3, 1995 – December 31, 2000	Jordan did not seek re-election in 2000 and instead won election to the Ohio Senate.
Derrick Seaver	Republican	January 3, 2001 – December 31, 2006	Seaver served as a Democrat from 2001 to 2004; did not seek re-election in 2006.
John Adams	Republican	January 2, 2007 – December 31, 2014	Adams was term-limited in 2014.
Nino Vitale	Republican	January 6, 2015 – present	Incumbent

== 86th district ==
The 86th district has always been based in west-central Ohio, and now comprises Union County and the majority of Marion County including Big Island, Green Camp, LaRue, Marion, New Bloomington, Prospect and Waldo.

It makes up one-third of the 26th Senate district. It has a Cook PVI of R+11.

Representative	Party	Term	Notes
Before 1967, seats were apportioned by county.
Rodney Hughes	Republican	January 3, 1967 – December 31, 1990	Hughes did not seek re-election in 1990.
Ed Core	Republican	January 3, 1991 – August 9, 1999	Core died while in office in 1999.
Tony Core	Republican	September 8, 1999 – December 31, 2008	Core was term-limited in 2008.
David Burke	Republican	January 5, 2009 – July 25, 2011	Burke resigned when appointed to the Ohio Senate.
Dorothy Liggett Pelanda	Republican	July 25, 2011 – January 6, 2019	
Tracy Richardson	Republican	January 6, 2019 - present	

== 87th district ==
The 87th district has always been based in west-central Ohio, and now comprises Crawford County, Morrow County and Wyandot County and the portions of Marion County including Caledonia and Morral and portions of Seneca County including New Riegel.

It makes up one-third of the 26th Senate district. It has a Cook PVI of R+10.

Representative	Party	Term	Notes
Before 1967, seats were apportioned by county.
Lloyd Kerns	Republican	January 3, 1961 – December 31, 1972	Kerns did not seek re-election in 1972.
Walter McClaskey	Republican	January 3, 1973 – December 31, 1986	McClaskey did not seek re-election in 1986.
Larry Adams	Republican	January 2, 1987 – December 31, 1990	Adams lost re-election in 1990 to Randy Weston.
Randy Weston	Democratic	January 3, 1991 – March 19, 1999	Weston resigned to take the position of associate director of AFSCME.
Robert Gooding	Democratic	March 19, 1999 – December 31, 2000	Gooding lost re-election in 2000 to Steve Reinhard.
Steve Reinhard	Republican	January 3, 2001 – December 31, 2008	Reinhard was term-limited and ran for the Ohio Senate.
Jeffrey McClain	Republican	January 5, 2009 – October 2, 2016	McClain was term-limited in 2016.
Wesley Goodman	Republican	November 16, 2016 – November 14, 2017	Resigned following a sex scandal.
Riordan McClain	Republican	January 10, 2018 – present	Incumbent

== 88th district ==
The 88th district has always been based in north-central Ohio, and now comprises Sandusky County and the portions of Seneca County including Attica, Bettsville, Bloomville, Fostoria, Green Springs, Republic and Tiffin.

It makes up one-third of the 26th Senate district. It has a Cook PVI of R+2.

Representative	Party	Term	Notes
Before 1967, seats were apportioned by county.
Robert Carpenter	Republican	January 3, 1963 – December 31, 1970	Carpenter did not seek re-election in 1970.
Paul Pfeifer	Republican	January 3, 1971 – December 31, 1972	Pfeifer lost the party renomination in 1972 to Gene Damschroder.
Gene Damschroder	Democratic	January 3, 1973 – December 31, 1982	Damchroder lost re-election in 1982 to Dwight Wise.
Dwight Wise	Democratic	January 3, 1983 – December 31, 1994	Wise lost re-election in 1994 to Rex Damschroder.
Rex Damschroder	Republican	January 3, 1995 – December 31, 2002	Damschroder was term-limited in 2002.
Jeff Wagner	Republican	January 3, 2003 – December 31, 2010	Wagner was term-limited in 2010.
Rex Damschroder	Republican	January 3, 2011 – December 31, 2014	Damschroder failed to qualify for the ballot in 2014.
Bill Reineke	Republican	January 6, 2015 – present	Incumbent

== 89th district ==
The 89th district has always been based in Sandusky in 1966 that now comprises Ottawa and Erie counties. It makes up one-third of the 2nd Senate district. It has a Cook PVI of D+4.

Representative	Party	Term	Notes
Before 1967, seats were apportioned by county.
Howard Knight	Republican	January 3, 1963 – December 31, 1972	Knight did not seek re-election in 1972.
Fred Deering	Democratic	January 3, 1973 – December 31, 1992	Deering did not seek re-election in 1992.
Darrell Opfer	Democratic	January 3, 1993 – August 10, 1999	Opfer resigned to executive director of the Ottawa County Community Improvement Corporation.
Chris Redfern	Democratic	September 8, 1999 – December 31, 2008	Redfern was term-limited in 2008.
Dennis Murray	Democratic	January 5, 2009 – December 31, 2012	Murray did not seek re-election in 2012.
Chris Redfern	Democratic	January 6, 2013 – December 31, 2014	Redfern lost re-election in 2014 to Steve Kraus.
Steve Kraus	Republican	January 5, 2015 – July 27, 2015	Kraus resigned after being convicted of a felony.
Steve Arndt	Republican	September 30, 2015 – August 1, 2019	
DJ Swearingen	Republican	August 1, 2019 – present	Incumbent

== 90th district ==
The 90th district has always been based in southern Ohio, and now comprises Adams County, Scioto County and portions of Lawrence County including Coal Grove, Hanging Rock and Ironton. It makes up one-third of the 14th Senate district. It has a Cook PVI of D+1.

The district has been known as 'Vern Riffe Country', as it was represented by Vern Riffe, the longest serving Speaker of the House in Ohio history.

Representative	Party	Term	Notes
Before 1967, seats were apportioned by county.
Vern Riffe	Democratic	January 3, 1959 – December 31, 1994	Riffe did not seek re-election in 1994.
William L. Ogg	Democratic	January 3, 1995 – December 31, 2002	Ogg was term-limited in 2002.
Todd Book	Democratic	January 3, 2003 – December 31, 2010	Book was term-limited in 2010.
Terry Johnson	Republican	January 3, 2011 – present	Incumbent

== 91st district ==
The 91st district has always been based in southern Ohio, and now comprises Clinton, Highland and Pike counties, and two townships in Ross County. It makes up one-third of the 17th Senate district. It has a Cook PVI of R+8.

It is the seat of the current Speaker of the Ohio House of Representatives, Cliff Rosenberger.

Representative	Party	Term	Notes
Before 1967, seats were apportioned by county.
Bill Mussey	Republican	January 3, 1967 – December 31, 1972	Mussey did not seek re-election in 1972 and instead won election to the Ohio Senate.
Harry Mallott	Democratic	January 3, 1973 – December 31, 1990	Mallott was defeated for re-election in 1990 by Doug White.
Doug White	Republican	January 5, 1991 – April 16, 1996	White resigned in 1996 to take a seat in the Ohio Senate.
Dennis Stapleton	Republican	April 16, 1996 – December 31, 2002	Stapleton was re-districted and did not seek re-election in 2002.
David T. Daniels	Republican	January 5, 2003 – December 31, 2010	Daniels was term-limited and won election to the Ohio Senate in 2010.
Cliff Rosenberger	Republican	January 3, 2011 – present	Incumbent

== 92nd district ==
The 92nd district has always been based in southern Ohio, and now comprises Fayette County and all but two townships in Ross County and portions of Pickaway County including Commercial Point, Darbyville, Harrisburg, New Holland, Orient and Williamsport.

It makes up one-third of the 17th Senate district. It has a Cook PVI of R+5. The seat was represented by former Ohio Lieutenant Governor Myrl Shoemaker from 1959 to 1982.

Representative	Party	Term	Notes
Before 1967, seats were apportioned by county.
Myrl Shoemaker	Democratic	January 3, 1959 – December 31, 1982	Shoemaker did not seek re-election and instead won election as Ohio Lieutenant Governor in 1982.
Mike Shoemaker	Democratic	January 3, 1983 – February 8, 1997	Shoemaker resigned in 1997 to take a seat in the Ohio Senate.
Joseph P. Sulzer	Democratic	February 8, 1997 – December 31, 2002	Sulzer lost re-election in 2002 to John M. Schlichter.
John M. Schlichter	Republican	January 3, 2003 – December 31, 2008	Schlichter lost re-election in 2008 to Raymond Pryor.
Raymond Pryor	Democratic	January 5, 2009 – December 31, 2010	Pryor lost Re-election in 2010 to Bob Peterson.
Bob Peterson	Republican	January 3, 2011 – May 6, 2012	Peterson resigned in 2012 to take a seat in the Ohio Senate.
Gary Scherer	Republican	May 14, 2012 – present	Incumbent

== 93rd district ==
The 93rd district has always been based in southern Ohio, and now comprises Gallia County, Jackson County, portions of Lawrence County including Athalia, Chesapeake, Proctorville and South Point; and portions of Vinton County including McArthur.

It makes up one-third of the 17th Senate district. It has a Cook PVI of R+4.

Representative	Party	Term	Notes
Before 1967, seats were apportioned by county.
Ralph Welker	Republican	January 3, 1967 – December 31, 1972	Welker lost the party nomination in 1972 to Oakley C. Collins.
Oakley C. Collins	Republican	January 3, 1973 – December 31, 1974	Collins did not seek re-election in 1974 and instead won election to the Ohio Senate.
Ron James	Democratic	January 3, 1975 – February 10, 1983	James resigned in 1983 to become deputy director of the Ohio Department of Natural Resources.
Mark Malone	Democratic	February 10, 1983 – December 31, 1994	Malone lost re-election in 1994 to John Carey.
John Carey	Republican	January 3, 1995 – December 31, 2002	Carey was term-limited in 2002 and won election to the Ohio Senate.
Clyde Evans	Republican	January 3, 2003 – December 31, 2010	Evans was term-limited in 2010.
John Carey	Republican	January 3, 2011 – December 15, 2011	Carey resigned to take a position with Shawnee State University.
Philip H. Rose	Republican	December 21, 2011 – April 16, 2012	Rose resigned following the primary victory of Ryan Smith.
Ryan Smith	Republican	April 16, 2012 – present	Incumbent

== 94th district ==
The 94th district has been based in southern Ohio since 2002, and now comprises Meigs County and portions of Athens County including Albany, Amesville, Athens, Buchtel, Chauncey, Coolville and Nelsonville, portions of Vinton County including Hamden, Wilkesville and Zaleski and portions of Washington County including Belpre and parts of Marietta.

It makes up one-third of the 30th Senate district. It has a Cook PVI of D+8.

Representative	Party	Term	Notes
Before 1967, seats were apportioned by county.
Jimmy Stewart	Republican	January 3, 2003 – December 31, 2008	Stewart did not seek reelection and instead won election to the Ohio Senate.
Debbie Phillips	Democratic	January 5, 2009 – December 31, 2016	Phillips was term-limited in 2016.
Jay Edwards	Republican	January 3, 2017 – present	Incumbent

== 95th district ==
The 95th district sprawls across southeastern Ohio and now comprises Carroll, Harrison and Noble counties and portions of Belmont County including Barnesville, Belmont, Bethesda, Fairview, Flushing, Holloway, Morristown, St. Clairsville and Wilson and Washington County including Beverly, Lowell, Lower Salem, Macksburg, Matamoras and part of Marietta.

It makes up one-third of the 30th Senate district. It has a Cook PVI of EVEN. The seat is unique as Ohio Governor Nancy P. Hollister represented the district following her governorship, albeit she was only Governor for 10 days.

Representative	Party	Term	Notes
Before 1967, seats were apportioned by county.
Don Goddard	Republican	January 3, 1965 – December 31, 1970	Goddard lost the party re-nomination to Sam Speck in 1970.
Sam Speck	Republican	January 3, 1971 – December 31, 1976	Speck did not seek re-election in 1976 but instead won election to the Ohio Senate.
Tom Johnson	Republican	January 3, 1977 – January 5, 1999	Johnson resigned in 1999 to become head of the Office of Budget and Management.
Nancy P. Hollister	Republican	January 5, 1999 – December 31, 2004	Hollister is a former Ohio Governor and lost re-election in 2004 to Jennifer Garrison.
Jennifer Garrison	Democratic	January 3, 2005 – December 6, 2010	Garrison did not seek re-election in 2010 and resigned prior to the expiration of her term.
Larry Woodford	Democratic	December 8, 2010 – December 31, 2010	Woodford was appointed as a place-holder and did not seek election in 2010.
Andy Thompson	Republican	January 3, 2011 – December 31, 2018	Andrew Thompson was not able to file for re-election due to term limits.
Don Jones	Republican	January 1, 2019–present	Incumbent.

== 96th district ==
The 96th district has been based in Steubenville since 1966 and now comprises all of Jefferson and Monroe counties and portions of Belmont County including Bellaire, Bridgeport, Brookside, Colerain, Martins Ferry, Mead Township, Pease Township, Powhatan Point, Pultney Township, Shadyside, Smith Township, Washington Township, York Township and Yorkville.

It makes up one-third of the 30th Senate district. It has a Cook PVI of D+10.

Representative	Party	Term	Notes
Before 1967, seats were apportioned by county.
Douglas Applegate	Democratic	January 3, 1961 – December 31, 1968	Applegate did not seek re-election in 1968 and instead won election to the Ohio Senate.
Arthur Bowers	Democratic	January 3, 1969 – December 31, 1986	Bowers did not seek reelection in 1986.
Jerry W. Krupinski	Democratic	January 2, 1987 – December 31, 2000	Krupinski was term-limited in 2000.
Eileen Krupinski	Democratic	January 3, 2001 – December 31, 2002	Krupinski lost the party renomination in 2002 to John Domenick.
John Domenick	Democratic	January 3, 2003 – December 31, 2010	Domenick was term-limited in 2010.
Lou Gentile	Democratic	January 3, 2011 – December 15, 2011	Gentile resigned following his appointment to the Ohio Senate.
Jack Cera	Democratic	December 15, 2011 – present	Incumbent

== 97th district ==
The 97th district has been based in Zanesville, Ohio and Muskingum County since 1966 and now consists of all of Guernsey County and the majority of Muskingum County. It has a Cook PVI of R+3.

Representative	Party	Term	Notes
Before 1967, seats were apportioned by county.
David Weissert	Republican	January 3, 1961 – December 31, 1972	Weissert did not seek re-election in 1972.
Rex Kieffer Jr.	Republican	January 3, 1973 – December 31, 1978	Kieffer did not seek re-election in 1978.
Jim Ross	Republican	January 3, 1979 – December 31, 1982	Ross lost re-election in 1982 to Joe Secrest.
Joe Secrest	Democratic	January 3, 1983 – June 30, 1992	Secrest resigned prior to the expiration of his term.
Michael McCullough	Democratic	June 30, 1992 – December 31, 1992	McCullough lost re-election in 1992 to Joy Padgett.
Joy Padgett	Republican	January 3, 1993 – June 30, 1999	Padgett resigned after appointed as the Governor's director of the Office of Appalachia.
Jim Aslanides	Republican	June 30, 1999 – December 31, 2008	Aslanides was term-limited in 2008.
Troy Balderson	Republican	January 5, 2009 – July 24, 2011	Balderson resigned following appointment to the Ohio Senate.
Brian Hill	Republican	July 24, 2011 – present	Incumbent

== 98th district ==
The 98th district has been based in eastern Ohio since 1966 and now comprises Tuscarawas County, and portions of Holmes County including Baltic, Glenmont and Killbuck. It makes up one-third of the 31st Senate district. It has a Cook PVI of R+4.

The district was represented by Speaker of the House A.G. Lancione for over thirty years, who was followed by former Congressman Wayne Hays and future Congressmen Bob Ney and Charlie Wilson.

Representative	Party	Term	Notes
Before 1967, seats were apportioned by county.
A.G. Lancione	Democratic	January 3, 1947 – December 31, 1978	Lancione did not seek re-election in 1978.
Wayne Hays	Democratic	January 3, 1979 – December 31, 1980	Hays was defeated in 1980 by Bob Ney.
Bob Ney	Republican	January 3, 1979 – December 31, 1982	Ney lost re-election to Jack Cera in 1982.
Jack Cera	Democratic	January 3, 1983 – December 31, 1996	Cera did not seek re-election in 1996 and instead ran for the Ohio Senate.
Charlie Wilson	Democratic	January 3, 1997 – December 31, 2004	Wilson was term-limited in 2004 and won election to the Ohio Senate.
Allan Sayre	Democratic	January 3, 2005 – June 2, 2010	Sayre resigned in 2010 prior to the expiration of his term.
Joshua O'Farrell	Democratic	June 2, 2010 – December 31, 2010	O'Farrell lost re-election in 2010 to Al Landis.
Al Landis	Republican	January 3, 2011 – present	Incumbent

== 99th district ==
The 99th district has been based in Ashtabula, Ohio since 1966 and now comprises most of Ashtabula County including Ashtabula, Conneaut, Geneva, Geneva-on-the-Lake, Jefferson, North Kingsville, Roaming Shores and Rock Creek, and portions of Geauga County including Aquilla and Chardon.

It makes up one-third of the 32nd Senate district. It has a Cook PVI of D+4.

Representative	Party	Term	Notes
Before 1967, seats were apportioned by county.
E. W. Lampson	Republican	January 3, 1963 – December 31, 1972	Lampson did not seek re-election in 1972.
Bob Boggs	Democratic	January 3, 1973 – December 31, 1982	Boggs did not seek re-election in 1982 and instead won election to the Ohio Senate.
Ross Boggs	Democratic	January 3, 1983 – February 17, 1999	Boggs resigned to serve on the Unemployment Compensation Board of Review.
George Distel	Democratic	February 17, 1999 – March 31, 2008	Distel resigned to serve as Director of the Ohio Turnpike Commission.
Deborah Newcomb	Democratic	May 20, 2008 – December 31, 2010	Newcomb lost re-election in 2010 to Casey Kozlowski.
Casey Kozlowski	Republican	January 3, 2011 – December 31, 2012	Kozlowski lost re-election in 2012 to John Patterson.
John Patterson	Democratic	January 6, 2013 – present	Incumbent

== Defunct districts ==
=== Former Cuyahoga County and Lucas County districts ===
Cuyahoga County has had six districts eliminated since 1966, the first eliminated following the 1972 redistricting, and most recently in 2012. Lucas County, Ohio, has lost one district since 1966, eliminated following the 1972 redistricting.

10th district (1966-1982) The 10th district was active from 1966 to 1982.

Representative	Party	Term	Tenure	Notes
Larry Smith	Democratic	January 2, 1967 – December 31, 1972	3	Lost primary nomination
Thomas M. Bell	Democratic	January 1, 1973 – January 3, 1983	5	Redistricted out of existence (did not seek re-election)

48th district (1966-1972) The 48th district was active from 1966 to 1972.

Representative	Party	Term	Tenure	Notes
James J. Flannery	Democraticic	January 1, 1967 - December 31, 1972	3	Redistricted out of existence (unsuccessfully ran for Cuyahoga County Auditor)

51st district (1966-1972) The 51st district was active from 1966 to 1972.

Representative	Party	Term	Tenure	Notes
Ron Mottl	Democratic	January 1, 1967 – December 31, 1969	1	Did not seek reelection (ran for state senate)
Gertrude Polcar	Republican	January 1, 1969 – December 23, 1971	2	Resigned after winning election to judgeship
Donna Pope	Republican	December 23, 1971 – December 31, 1972	1	Redistricted out of existence (ran successfully in new House District 12 [existed from 1966 to 1982])

57th district (1966-1972) The 57th district was active from 1966 to 1972.

Representative	Party	Term	Tenure	Notes
Frank Pokorny	Democratic	January 1, 1963 – January 30, 1968	3	Resigned due to appointment as Cuyahoga County Commissioner
Joseph S. Cloonan	Democratic	January 30, 1968 – December 31, 1968	partial	Appointed to unexpired term (Jan. 30 to Nov. 7); won election to six-week unexpired term (Nov. 8 to Jan. 2)
Walter Rutkowski	Democratic	January 1, 1969 – December 31, 1972	2	Redistricted out of existence (lost election to new House District 12 [existed from 1966 to 1982])

55th district (1966-1972) The 55th district was active from 1966 to 1972.

Representative	Party	Term	Tenure	Notes
Frank Gorman	Democraticic	January 1, 1967 - December 31, 1968	1	Did not seek re-election (ran for judgeship)
Leonard Ostrovsky	Democraticic	January 1, 1969 - December 31, 1972	2	Redistricted out of existence (successfully ran in new House District 17 [existed from 1973 to ?])

53rd district (1966-1972) The 53rd district was active from 1966 to 1972.

Representative	Party	Term	Tenure	Notes
George Voinovich	Republican	January 1, 1967 – November 25, 1971	3	Resigned to become Cuyahoga County Auditor
Edward Ryder	Republican	December 13, 1971 – December 31, 1972	1	Redistricted out of existence; lost election to new House District 18

77th district (1966-1972) The 77th district was active from 1966 to 1972.

Representative	Party	Term	Tenure	Notes
James Weldishofer	Republican	January 1, 1967 - December 31, 1968	1	Not known
Donald Fraser	Republican	January 1, 1969 – December 31, 1972	2	Redistricted out of existence

=== Former multi-county districts ===
The 2nd district from 1966 to 1972 comprised Paulding, Van Wert and Auglaize counties and portions of Putnam and Mercer counties. It was combined with another district following the 1970 census.

Representative	Party	Term	Notes
Robert Wilhelm	Republican	January 3, 1965 – December 31, 1972	Wilhelm was redistricted into another district and lost re-nomination.

Representative	Party	Term	Tenure	Notes
Jim Panno	Democratic	January 3, 1965 – June 9, 1970	5	Died
George D. Tablack	Democratic	June 9, 1970 – December 31, 1976	6	Did not seek re-election
Joseph Vukovich	Democratic	January 2, 1977 – December 31, 1992	16	Did not seek re-election
Francis Carr	Democratic	January 3, 1993 – December 31, 1994	2	Lost re-election
Ron Hood	Republican	January 3, 1995 – December 31, 2000	6	Lost re-election
John Boccieri	Democratic	January 3, 2001 – December 31, 2006	6	Ran for the Ohio Senate
Mark Okey	Democratic	January 2, 2007 – present		

Representative	Party	Term	Tenure	Notes
Robert Roderer	Republican	January 3, 1955 – December 31, 1968	14	Lost re-election
Richard Wittenberg	Democratic	January 3, 1973 – December 31, 1974	2	Lost re-election
Tony P. Hall	Democratic	January 3, 1969 – December 31, 1972	4	Ran for the Ohio Senate
Paul Leonard	Democratic	January 3, 1973 – December 31, 1980	8	Ran for Mayor of Dayton, Ohio
Larry Balweg	Democratic	January 3, 1981 – December 31, 1982	2	District relocated

== See also ==
- List of Ohio state legislatures
