= Senator Greenwood =

Senator Greenwood may refer to:

- Jim Greenwood (American politician) (born 1951), Pennsylvania State Senate
- Levi H. Greenwood (1872–1930), Massachusetts State Senate
- Tim Greenwood (born 1940s), Ohio State Senate
