= Ed Burden =

American politician

Member of the Ohio House of Representatives from the 69th district
- In office February 11, 1970 – December 31, 1970
- Preceded by: Bill Bowen
- Succeeded by: James Rankin

Personal details
- Born: March 22, 1925
- Died: June 20, 1997 (aged 72) Cincinnati, Ohio
- Party: Democratic

Edward B. Burden (March 22, 1925 – June 20, 1997) was a former member of the Ohio House of Representatives.
