= James Mueller (Ohio politician) =

American politician

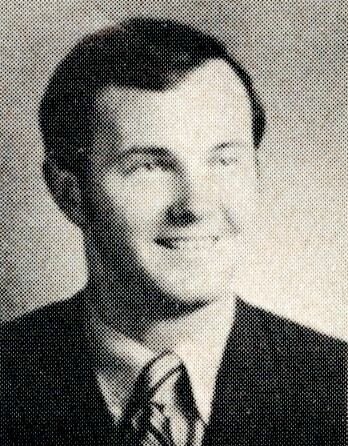

Member of the Ohio House of Representatives from the 74th district
- In office January 3, 1971-December 31, 1974
- Preceded by: James I. Hunt
- Succeeded by: Dennis Wojtanowski

Personal details
- Born: 1943 or 1944 (age 81–82)
- Party: Democratic

James A. Mueller is a former member of the Ohio House of Representatives.
