= Ed DeChant =

American politician

Member of the Ohio House of Representatives from the 74th district
- In office January 3, 1949-December 31, 1968
- Preceded by: None (First)
- Succeeded by: Leo Camera

Personal details
- Born: September 30, 1888 Lorain, Ohio, U.S.
- Died: June 15, 1972 (aged 83) Lorain, Ohio, U.S.
- Party: Democratic

Edward DeChant (September 30, 1888 – June 15, 1972) was a Democratic politician who formerly served in the Ohio House of Representatives. A native of Lorain, Ohio, DeChant was initially elected to the Ohio House in 1948. He was sworn into office in 1949, in what would be the beginning of a long career in the legislature. For the most of his tenure he represented an at-large of Lorain County. However, following the Voting Rights Act of 1965, the House went to district representation. He won election to the newly apportioned 74th District in 1966.

DeChant retired from the House in 1968, after serving in the House for twenty years, or ten terms. He returned to private law practice following his retirement from politics. He died in 1972.
