= Phillip DeLaine =

American politician

Member of the Ohio House of Representatives from the 44th district
- In office January 15, 1968 – December 31, 1970
- Preceded by: Carl Stokes
- Succeeded by: John D. Thompson Jr.

Personal details
- Born: January 26, 1928 Cleveland, Ohio, U.S.
- Died: May 7, 1975 (aged 47) Bethesda, Maryland, U.S.
- Party: Democratic

Phillip Morgan DeLaine (January 26, 1928 – May 7, 1975) was an American politician who served as a Democratic member of the Ohio House of Representatives from 1968 to 1970. He served in the U.S. Army for two years, attended Kent State University, and served as policeman in Cleveland from 1953 to 1967. He won the 1968 special election to succeed Carl Stokes, the newly elected Cleveland mayor, and was re-elected later that year. He lost the 1970 and 1972 primaries to John D. Thompson Jr. After leaving the legislature, DeLaine was a state liquor examiner. He died at the age of 47 on May 7, 1975, in Bethesda, Maryland.
