= James Rankin (Ohio politician) =

American politician

James W. Rankin
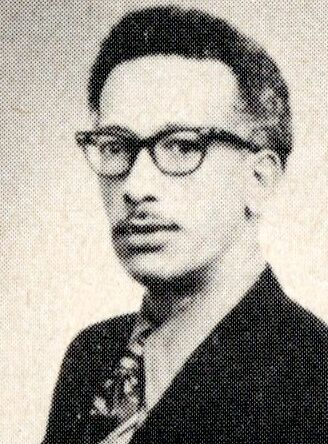

Member of the Ohio House of Representatives from the 25th district
- In office January 3, 1971 – June 28, 1978
- Preceded by: Ed Burden
- Succeeded by: Helen Rankin

Personal details
- Born: April 10, 1926
- Died: June 28, 1978 (aged 52) Cincinnati, Ohio, United States
- Party: Democratic

James W. Rankin (April 10, 1926 – June 28, 1978) served in the Ohio House of Representatives.
