= Michael Camera =

American politician

Member of the Ohio House of Representatives from the 55th district
- In office January 3, 1983-December 31, 1984
- Preceded by: Leo Camera
- Succeeded by: Joseph Koziura

Personal details
- Party: Democratic

Michael Camera is a former member of the Ohio House of Representatives.
