= Robert Roderer =

American politician (1926–2014)

Member of the Ohio House of Representatives from the 87th district
- In office January 3, 1955 – December 31, 1968
- Preceded by: None (First)
- Succeeded by: Tony P. Hall

Personal details
- Born: May 30, 1926 Dayton, Ohio, U.S.
- Died: September 9, 2014 (aged 88) Dayton, Ohio, U.S.
- Party: Democratic

Robert Laverne Roderer (May 30, 1926 – September 9, 2014) was an American politician who was a member of the Ohio House of Representatives.

Roderer was born in Dayton, Ohio on May 30, 1926. He died in Dayton on September 9, 2014, at the age of 88.
