= John Brandenberg =

American politician

Member of the Ohio House of Representatives from the 20th district
- In office January 3, 1973-December 31, 1976
- Preceded by: Gordon H. Scherer
- Succeeded by: Thomas Pottenger

Personal details
- Party: Republican

John Brandenberg is a former member of the Ohio General Assembly. Brandenberg was originally elected in 1972, and reelected in 1974. However, in 1976, former Rep. Thomas Pottenger opted to run for Bradenberg's seat, creating a primary for the Republican nomination. As a result, Brandenberg was defeated for a third term, and Pottenger went on to win the general election. Prior and after his stint in the House, Brandenberg practiced private law.
