= Larry Nord =

American politician

Member of the Ohio House of Representatives from the 98th district
- In office January 3, 1969 – December 31, 1970
- Preceded by: Margaret Dennison
- Succeeded by: Bob Nader

Personal details
- Born: 1936 or 1937 (age 88–89)
- Party: Republican

Larry Nord (born c. 1937) is a former member of the Ohio House of Representatives.
