= Bill Anderson (Ohio politician) =

American politician

Member of the Ohio House of Representatives from the 73rd district
- In office January 3, 1967 – December 31, 1968
- Preceded by: None (First)
- Succeeded by: Thomas Pottenger

Personal details
- Party: Republican

Bill Anderson is a former member of the Ohio House of Representatives.
