= Thomas Pottenger =

American politician

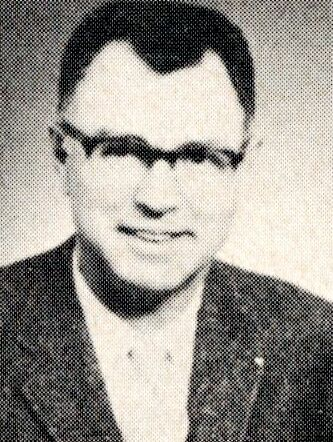

Member of the Ohio House of Representatives from the 20th district
- In office January 3, 1977-July 20, 1990
- Preceded by: John Brandenberg
- Succeeded by: Cheryl Winkler
- In office January 3, 1969-December 31, 1972
- Preceded by: Bill Anderson
- Succeeded by: Jim Luken

Personal details
- Born: June 9, 1920
- Died: October 23, 2003 (aged 83) Cincinnati, Ohio
- Party: Republican

Thomas Alexander Pottenger (June 9, 1920 – October 24, 2003) was an American politician. He was a member of the Ohio House of Representatives. Originally elected to the House in 1968, Pottenger served two terms before losing the primary election to Richard Finan, much due to an unpopular vote regarding taxes. However, he made a comeback in 1976 by doing the same to fellow Republican John Brandenberg.

In 1990, Pottenger resigned from his House seat to take a position on the Ohio Employment Relations Board. He would serve on the SERB for a number of years in the Nineties. Pottenger died in 2003.
