= Dale Schmidt =

American politician

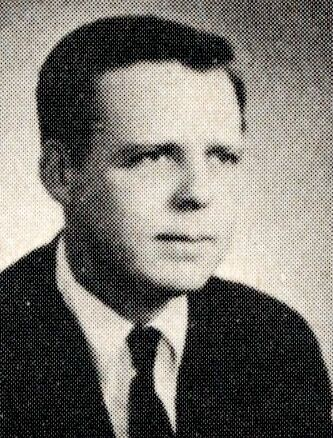

Member of the Ohio House of Representatives from the 66th district
- In office January 3, 1969 – December 31, 1972
- Preceded by: W. Ray Cadwallader
- Succeeded by: Jim Luken

Personal details
- Born: October 15, 1931 Ohio, United States
- Died: July 12, 2006 (aged 74) Cincinnati, Ohio, United States
- Party: Republican

Dale G. Schmidt (October 15, 1931 – July 12, 2006) was a member of the Ohio House of Representatives.
