= Leo Camera =

American politician

Joseph Leonard Camera
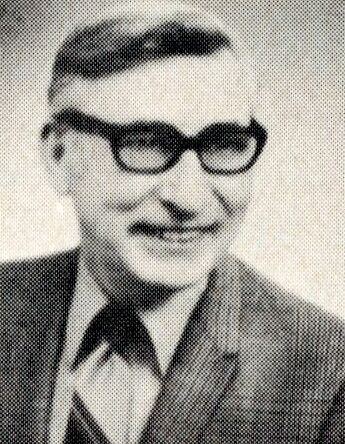

Member of the Ohio House of Representatives from the 53rd district
- In office January 3, 1969 – December 31, 1982
- Preceded by: Ed DeChant
- Succeeded by: Michael Camera

Personal details
- Born: August 14, 1914 Franklin, Missouri
- Died: June 30, 1993 (aged 78) Lorain, Ohio
- Party: Democratic

Joseph Leonard Camera (August 14, 1914 – June 30, 1993) is a Democratic politician who formerly served as a member of the Ohio House of Representatives. A native of Lorain, Ohio, Camera entered the race to replace retired Rep. Ed DeChant in 1968 and won the nomination and general election. He was sworn into office on January 3, 1969, and would serve a portion of Lorain County for the entirety of the 1970s.

A longtime labor leader, Camera served as Chairman of the House Commerce and Labor Committee for much of his later tenure in the legislature. In 1982, he would retire, and was succeeded by his cousin, Michael Camera. Following his time in the legislature, he would return to Lorain and retire.
