= J. Tom Lendrum =

American politician

Tom Lendrum

Member of the Ohio House of Representatives from the 61st district
- In office January 3, 2001 – December 31, 2002
- Preceded by: Bill Taylor
- Succeeded by: Kathleen Walcher

Personal details
- Born: December 24, 1927 Kalamazoo, Michigan
- Died: July 17, 2016 (aged 88) Lorain, Ohio
- Party: Republican

John Thomas Lendrum (December 24, 1927 – July 17, 2016) was a member of the Ohio House of Representatives from 2001 to 2002. His district consisted of portions of Lorain County, Ohio. He was succeeded by Kathleen Walcher.

Lendrum held a bachelor's degree in mechanical engineering from Purdue University.

He died on July 17, 2016, in Lorain, Ohio, at the age of 88.
