= W. Ray Cadwallader =

American politician

Ray Cadwallader

Member of the Ohio House of Representatives from the 66th district
- In office January 3, 1965-December 31, 1968
- Preceded by: None (First)
- Succeeded by: Dale Schmidt

Personal details
- Party: Republican

William Rayburn Cadwallader (1931 – March 31, 2016) was a member of the Ohio House of Representatives.
