= Bill Taylor (Ohio politician) =

American politician

Member of the Ohio House of Representatives from the 63rd district
- In office January 3, 1995-December 31, 2000
- Preceded by: Katherine Walsh
- Succeeded by: J. Tom Lendrum

Personal details
- Party: Republican

Bill Taylor was a member of the Ohio House of Representatives from 1995 to 2000. His district consisted of a portion of Lorain County, Ohio. He was elected in the 1994 election with a margin of only 12 votes. He was succeeded by J. Tom Lendrum.
