= Margaret Dennison =

American politician (1920–2010)

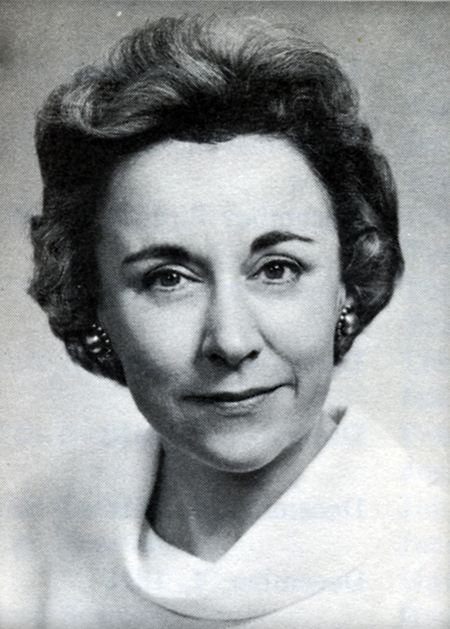

Member of the Ohio House of Representatives from the 98th district
- In office January 3, 1963 – December 31, 1968
- Preceded by: None (First)
- Succeeded by: Larry Nord

Personal details
- Born: June 14, 1920 Cleveland, Ohio
- Died: September 17, 2010 (aged 90) Hubbard Township, Trumbull County, Ohio
- Party: Democratic

Margaret Gillmer Kroehle Dennison (June 14, 1920 – September 17, 2010) was a former member of the Ohio House of Representatives.
