= Dennis Wojtanowski =

American politician

Member of the Ohio House of Representatives from the 74th district
- In office January 3, 1975 – December 31, 1982
- Preceded by: James Mueller
- Succeeded by: Bob Clark

Personal details
- Born: February 27, 1950 (age 76) Iselin, New Jersey, United States
- Party: Democratic

Dennis Wojtanowski is an American former member of the Ohio House of Representatives and co-founder of the Columbus, Ohio-based nonprofit organization Democratic Voices.

== Political experience ==
Wojtanowski was a Democratic State Representative for Ohio House District 74 representing parts of Lake and Geauga counties where he was elected for 4 terms and served from 1975 to 1981.

Wojtanowski served as the Executive Assistant for Legislative Affairs in the administration of former Governor Dick Celeste.

In 2013, Wojtanowski started Democratic Voices with long-time colleague and friend, Jeff Rechenbach.

In 2012, Wojtanowski volunteered for the re-election campaign of U.S. Senator Sherrod Brown.

In 2014, Wojtanowski withdrew his bid to become chairman of the Ohio Democratic Party after some Democrats expressed concern about his lobbying past and past donations to Republicans.

== Business career ==
From 2004 to 2011, Wojtanowski was co-owner and managing member for W&W Swinson, LLC, a real estate development company.

In 2009, Wojtanowski served as president of the Ohio Auto Industry Support Council established by former Governor Ted Strickland. As president, he led the efforts to stabilize and strengthen Ohio's auto sector.

He was chairman and CEO of the Success Group in Columbus, Ohio from 1984 to 2003, a lobbying firm.

== Philanthropic work and awards ==
In 2006, Wojtanowski was awarded an honorary Doctor of Laws (LL.D.) by the National University.

Wojtanowski has served on a number of boards and foundations, including the Ohio Arts Council, Progress Ohio, the government affairs steering committee of the Columbus Chamber of Commerce, the visiting committee of the College of Urban Affairs at Cleveland State University, Chair of board-level Committee on Diversity at Medical Mutual of Ohio. He has also served as a national board member of the Camphill Foundation.
