= James Weldishofer =

American politician (born 1929)

Member of the Ohio House of Representatives from the 77th district
- In office January 3, 1967 – December 31, 1968
- Preceded by: None (First)
- Succeeded by: Donald Fraser

Personal details
- Born: 1929 (age 96–97)
- Party: Republican
- Spouse: Bonnie Ann Weldishofer (died. 2022)

James Ray Weldishofer (born 1929) is an American former politician who was a member of the Ohio House of Representatives.
