= Tim Greenwood =

American politician

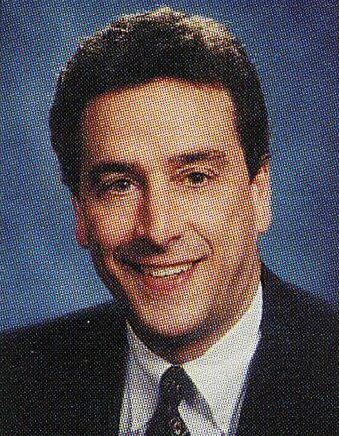

Member of the Ohio Senate from the 2nd district
- In office January 3, 1995 – October 5, 1995
- Preceded by: Betty Montgomery
- Succeeded by: Steve Yarbrough

Member of the Ohio House of Representatives from the 51st district
- In office January 3, 1989 – January 3, 1995
- Preceded by: Arlene Singer
- Succeeded by: Lynn Olman

Personal details
- Born: 1948 or 1949 (age 77–78)
- Party: Republican
- Education: Denison University (BA); University of Toledo (JD)

Truman A. Greenwood is an American politician and attorney who served in both chambers of the Ohio General Assembly. Greenwood challenged incumbent Representative Arlene Singer in 1988, and was sworn in on January 3, 1989.

== Education ==
Greenwood earned a Bachelor of Arts degree from Denison University and Juris Doctor from the University of Toledo College of Law.

== Career ==
Greenwood won a second term in 1990, with 58% of the vote. He faced a primary challenge in 1992, but went on to win both the primary and general elections. He again was reelected in 1994, for a fourth consecutive term.

In 1994, Senator Betty Montgomery was elected as Ohio Attorney General, and resigned from her Senate seat. As a result, Greenwood was appointed to fill the vacancy left in the Ohio Senate. He resigned from the House in January 1995. However, only six months into his Senate tenure, Greenwood announced he would resign, citing an inability to spend time with his family. He resigned from the Senate in October 1995.

Following his resignation, he returned to private law practice. From 1999 to 2003, he served by gubernatorial appointment as a member of the Ohio Turnpike Commission. He serves as outside counsel for the Ohio Attorney General and is the Law Director of Sylvania Township.
