= Larry Balweg =

American politician

Larry Ballweg

Member of the Ohio House of Representatives from the 37th district
- In office January 3, 1981 – December 31, 1982
- Preceded by: Paul Leonard
- Succeeded by: District Eliminated

Personal details
- Party: Democratic

Larry Balweg is a former member of the Ohio House of Representatives.
