= John D. Thompson Jr. =

American politician

John Thompson
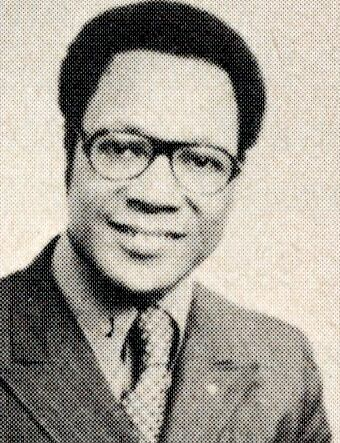

Member of the Ohio House of Representatives from the 16th district
- In office January 3, 1971-October 16, 1986
- Preceded by: Phillip DeLaine
- Succeeded by: Vermel Whalen

Personal details
- Born: December 17, 1928
- Died: October 15, 1986 (aged 57) Cleveland, Ohio, United States
- Party: Democratic

John D. Thompson Jr. (December 17, 1928 – October 15, 1986) was a member of the Ohio House of Representatives. He was black and died of cancer, aged 57.
