= Donald Fraser (Ohio politician) =

American politician

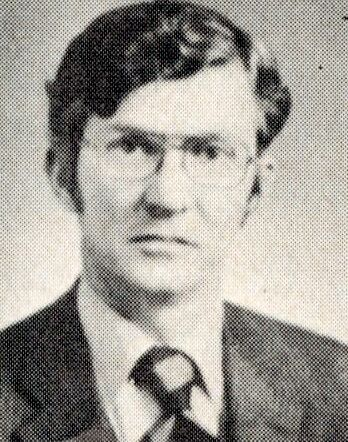

Member of the Ohio House of Representatives from the 77th district
- In office January 3, 1969-December 31, 1972
- Preceded by: James Weldishofer
- Succeeded by: Richard L. Wittenberg

Personal details
- Born: May 21, 1927 Perrysburg, Ohio
- Died: December 28, 2010 (aged 83) Fort Myers, Florida
- Party: Republican

Donald R. Fraser (May 21, 1927 – December 28, 2010) was a member of the Ohio House of Representatives.
