= Lynn Olman =

American politician

Member of the Ohio House of Representatives from the 46th district
- In office January 4, 1995 – December 31, 2004
- Preceded by: Tim Greenwood
- Succeeded by: Mark Wagoner

Personal details
- Party: Republican
- Education: Ohio University (BS)

Lynn Olman is an American politician who served in the Ohio House of Representatives from 1995 to 2004.

== Early life and education ==
Olman grew up in Maumee, Ohio. Olman is one of seven siblings. In 1965, he graduated from Maumee High School, where he played football, baseball, and track. In 1969, Olman earned a Bachelor of Science degree in journalism from Ohio University. During college, Olman was involved in student government, the Phi Delta Theta fraternity, and the Inter-College Church Council.

== Career ==
In 1973, Olman became affiliated with State Farm. Building an insurance agency that represented over 3,000 families in Northwest Ohio, Olman has been recognized by State Farm by being named to the Millionaire Club every year since 1973, receiving the Legion Honor seven times, receiving the Bronze Tablet twice and has been honored nine times at national company conventions.

Olman served as a member and President of Maumee City Council for fifteen years. Throughout his tenure, he served on nearly every council committee at some point, and was Council President/Vice Mayor for four years.

In 1995, Olman was appointed to the Ohio House of Representatives to represent the 51st House District, covering much of western Lucas County. He was subsequently elected to the seat in 1996, 1998 and 2000. He served as Chairman of the House Public Utilities Committee and sat on both the House Insurance and Ways and Means Committees. Olman served as co-chairman on the House Select Committee on Ohio's Energy Policy. He was also appointed by the Speaker of the House to serve on the Ohio Port Authority Advisory Council, the Joint Legislative Committee to study Ohio's Public Retirement Plans, the Ohio Lottery Profits Review Commission, the Joint Committee to study Electric Utility Deregulation, the Ohio Power Siting Board and the Legislative Commission on Lake Erie. Olman was also appointed to the Midwest-Canada Relations Committee of the Midwestern Legislative Conference (MLC) of the Council of State Governments, and he previously served as the co-chairman of the Joint Legislative Committee on Decentralization of State Government, helping to guide the publication of its final report in May 1998.

== Personal life ==
Olman and his wife, Joyce, reside in Maumee, Ohio and have three sons. They are members of St. Paul's Lutheran Church, where Olman and Joyce teach Sunday School.
