= Arlene Singer =

American politician

Member of the Ohio House of Representatives from the 48th district
- In office January 2, 1987 – December 31, 1988
- Preceded by: John Galbraith

Personal details
- Born: October 10th, 1948 Toledo, Ohio, U.S.
- Died: June 29, 2025 (aged 76)
- Party: Democratic
- Spouse: John M. Wilson

Arlene Singer (October 10, 1948 - June 29, 2025) was an American politician, attorney, and former judge of the Ohio Sixth District Court of Appeals (retired). She is a former Judge of the Toledo Municipal Court and served as a member of the Ohio House of Representatives.

== Public Service ==
=== Elected Positions ===
Judge, Ohio Sixth District Court of Appeals. Elected 2002, re-elected 2008 and 2014. Presiding Judge, Ohio Sixth District Court of Appeals. 2005 and 2006; 2012 and 2013. Retired.

Judge, Toledo Municipal Court. Appointed in January, 1991 by then-Governor Dick Celeste, and elected to the unexpired term in November, 1991. Re-elected to full term, November, 1995 and November, 2001. Presiding and Administrative Judge, Toledo Municipal Court. 2000 and 2001.

Member, Ohio House of Representatives, 117th General Assembly. Represented the 48th District, 1987 and 1988.

=== Legal Community Leadership ===
- Establishing Founder, Toledo Women Lawyers History Project at the University of Toledo College of Law.
- Ohio Supreme Court, Board of Commissioners on Grievances and Discipline. Member, 2003 through 2011. Elected Vice-Chair for 2007, Elected Chair for 2008.
- Ohio Supreme Court, Task Force on the Code of Judicial Conduct. Member, 2007 and 2008.
- Toledo Bar Association, Board of Trustees. Elected 2000 and re-elected in 2003.

=== Public Service Recognition Awards ===
- YWCA of Northwest Ohio, Milestone Tribute for Contribution in Government (2015)
- Toledo Women's Bar Association, Arabella Babb Mansfield Award
- Toledo Bar Association, Robert A. Kelb Distinguished Service Award (2016)
- Toledo Junior Bar Association, Order of the Heel

=== Mentoring ===
- Ohio Supreme Court Lawyer to Lawyer Mentoring Program, 2006 to present
- Ohio Judicial College, Mentor Training
- University of Toledo, College of Law, Mentor
- Toledo Women's Bar Association, Mentor
