= 125th Ohio General Assembly =

Term of state legislature in Ohio, US

The One Hundred Twenty-fifth Ohio General Assembly was the legislative body of the state of Ohio in 2003 and 2004. In this General Assembly, both the Ohio Senate and the Ohio House of Representatives were controlled by the Republican Party. In the Senate, there were 22 Republicans and 11 Democrats. In the House, there were 63 Republicans and 36 Democrats. It is also the first General Assembly to use redistricted legislative districts after the 2000 Census.

== Major events ==
=== Vacancies ===
- March 4, 2003: Representative Jeffrey Manning (R-57th) resigns to become Lorain County, Ohio Prosecutor.
- August 31, 2003: Senator Leigh Herington (D-28th) resigns.
- December 2, 2003: Representative Dean DePiero (D-15th) resigns to become Mayor of Parma, Ohio.
- January 6, 2004: Senator James E. Carnes (R-20th) resigns.
- January 16, 2004: Representative Greg Jolivette (R-54th) resigns to become a Commissioner in Butler County, Ohio.
- March 5, 2004: Representative Bryan C. Williams (R-41) resigns to become Chair of Summit County, Ohio Board of Elections.

=== Appointments ===
- January 6, 2003: Steve Stivers appointed to Senate District 16 due to the resignation of Priscilla D. Mead.
- January 6, 2003: Marc Dann appointed to Senate District 32 due to the resignation of Tim Ryan.
- April 8, 2003: Earl Martin appointed to House District 57 due to the resignation of Jeffrey Manning.
- September 3, 2003: Kimberly Zurz appointed to Senate District 28 due to the resignation of Leigh Herington.
- December 2, 2003: Timothy J. DeGeeter appointed to House District 15 due to the resignation of Dean DePiero.
- January 6, 2004: Joy Padgett appointed to the 20th Senatorial District due to the resignation of James E. Carnes.
- January 21, 2004: Courtney Combs appointed to House District 54 due to the resignation of Greg Jolivette.
- March 5, 2004: Marilyn Slaby appointed to House District 41 due to the resignation of Bryan C. Williams.

=== Leadership changes ===
- January 6, 2004: John Boccieri resigns from Assistant Minority Whip; Lance Mason appointed.

== Senate ==
=== Leadership ===
==== Majority leadership ====
- President of the Senate: Doug White
- President pro tempore of the Senate: Jeff Jacobson
- Floor Leader: Randy Gardner
- Assistant Majority Floor Leader: Robert Spada
- Whip: Steve Austria
- Assistant Majority Whip: Jay Hottinger

==== Minority leadership ====
- Leader: Greg DiDonato
- Assistant Leader: Mark Mallory
- Whip: C.J. Prentiss
- Assistant Whip: Teresa Fedor

=== Members of the 125th Ohio Senate ===
| District | Senator | Party | First elected |
|---|---|---|---|
| 1 | Lynn Wachtmann | Republican | 1998 |
| 2 | Randy Gardner | Republican | 2000 |
| 3 | David Goodman | Republican | 2001 (Appt.) |
| 4 | Scott Nein | Republican | 1995 (Appt.) |
| 5 | Tom Roberts | Democratic | 2002 (Appt.) |
| 6 | Jeff Jacobson | Republican | 2000 |
| 7 | Robert Schuler | Republican | 2002 |
| 8 | Lou Blessing | Republican | 1996 |
| 9 | Mark Mallory | Democratic | 1998 |
| 10 | Steve Austria | Republican | 2000 |
| 11 | Teresa Fedor | Democratic | 2002 |
| 12 | Jim Jordan | Republican | 2000 |
| 13 | Jeff Armbruster | Republican | 1998 |
| 14 | Doug White | Republican | 1996 (Appt.) |
| 15 | Ray Miller | Democratic | 2002 |
| 16 | Steve Stivers | Republican | 2003 (Appt.) |
| 17 | John Carey | Republican | 2002 |
| 18 | Robert A. Gardner | Republican | 1996 |
| 19 | Bill Harris | Republican | 2000 (Appt.) |
| 20 | Joy Padgett | Republican | 2004 (Appt.) |
| 21 | C.J. Prentiss | Democratic | 1998 |
| 22 | Ron Amstutz | Republican | 2000 |
| 23 | Dan Brady | Democratic | 1998 |
| 24 | Robert Spada | Republican | 1999 (Appt.) |
| 25 | Eric Fingerhut | Democratic | 1998 |
| 26 | Larry Mumper | Republican | 1997 (Appt.) |
| 27 | Kevin Coughlin | Republican | 2001 (Appt.) |
| 28 | Kimberly Zurz | Democratic | 2003 (Appt.) |
| 29 | Kirk Schuring | Republican | 2002 |
| 30 | Gregory L. DiDonato | Democratic | 1996 |
| 31 | Jay Hottinger | Republican | 1998 (Appt.) |
| 32 | Marc Dann | Democratic | 2003 (Appt.) |
| 33 | Bob Hagan | Democratic | 1997 (Appt.) |

== House of Representatives ==
=== Leadership ===
==== Majority leadership ====
- Speaker of the House: Larry Householder
- President pro tempore of the Senate: Gary Cates
- Floor Leader: Patricia Clancy
- Assistant Majority Floor Leader: Steve Buehrer
- Majority Whip: Jim Trakas
- Assistant Majority Whip: Jon Peterson

==== Minority leadership ====
- Leader: Chris Redfern
- Assistant Leader: Joyce Beatty
- Whip: Dale Miller
- Assistant Whip: John Boccieri (January 6, 2003 – January 6, 2004), Lance Mason (January 6, 2004-)

=== Members of the 125th Ohio House of Representatives ===
| District | Representative | Party | First elected |
|---|---|---|---|
| 1 | Chuck Blasdel | Republican | 2000 |
| 2 | Jon Peterson | Republican | 2000 |
| 3 | Jim Carmichael | Republican | 2000 |
| 4 | John R. Willamowski | Republican | 1997 (Appt.) |
| 5 | Tim Schaffer | Republican | 2000 |
| 6 | Bob Latta | Republican | 2000 |
| 7 | Ed Jerse | Democratic | 1995 (Appt.) |
| 8 | Lance Mason | Democratic | 2002 (Appt.) |
| 9 | Claudette Woodard | Democratic | 2000 |
| 10 | Shirley Smith | Democratic | 1998 |
| 11 | Annie L. Key | Democratic | 2000 |
| 12 | Michael DeBose | Democratic | 2002 (Appt.) |
| 13 | Michael J. Skindell | Democratic | 2002 |
| 14 | Dale Miller | Democratic | 1996 |
| 15 | Timothy J. DeGeeter | Democratic | 2003 (Appt.) |
| 16 | Sally Conway Kilbane | Republican | 1998 |
| 17 | Jim Trakas | Republican | 1998 |
| 18 | Tom Patton | Republican | 2002 |
| 19 | Larry L. Flowers | Republican | 2000 |
| 20 | Jim McGregor | Republican | 2001 (Appt.) |
| 21 | Linda Reidelbach | Republican | 2000 |
| 22 | Jim Hughes | Republican | 2000 |
| 23 | Larry Wolpert | Republican | 2000 |
| 24 | Geoffrey C. Smith | Republican | 1998 |
| 25 | Dan Stewart | Democratic | 2002 |
| 26 | Larry Price | Democratic | 2002 |
| 27 | Joyce Beatty | Democratic | 1999 (Appt.) |
| 28 | Jim Raussen | Republican | 2002 |
| 29 | Patricia Clancy | Republican | 1996 |
| 30 | Bill Seitz | Republican | 2000 |
| 31 | Steve Driehaus | Democratic | 2000 |
| 32 | Catherine L. Barrett | Democratic | 1998 |
| 33 | Tyrone Yates | Democratic | 2002 |
| 34 | Tom Brinkman Jr. | Republican | 2000 |
| 35 | Michelle G. Schneider | Republican | 2000 |
| 36 | Arlene Setzer | Republican | 2000 |
| 37 | Jon Husted | Republican | 2000 |
| 38 | John White | Republican | 2000 |
| 39 | Dixie Allen | Democratic | 1998 (Appt.) |
| 40 | Fred Strahorn | Democratic | 2000 |
| 41 | Marilyn Slaby | Republican | 2004 (Appt.) |
| 42 | John Widowfield | Republican | 2001 (Appt.) |
| 43 | Mary Taylor | Republican | 2002 |
| 44 | Barbara Sykes | Democratic | 2000 |
| 45 | Robert J. Otterman | Democratic | 2000 |
| 46 | Lynn Olman | Republican | 1995 (Appt.) |
| 47 | Peter Ujvagi | Democratic | 2002 |
| 48 | Edna Brown | Democratic | 2001 (Appt.) |
| 49 | Jeanine Perry | Democratic | 1998 |
| 50 | John Hagan | Republican | 2000 |
| 51 | Scott Oelslager | Republican | 2002 |
| 52 | Mary Cirelli | Democratic | 2000 |
| 53 | Shawn Webster | Republican | 2000 |
| 54 | Courtney Combs | Republican | 2004 (Appt.) |
| 55 | Gary Cates | Republican | 1995 (Appt.) |
| 56 | Joseph Koziura | Democratic | 2001 (Appt.) |
| 57 | Earl Martin | Republican | 2003 (Appt.) |
| 58 | Kathleen Walcher | Republican | 2002 |
| 59 | Kenneth Carano | Democratic | 2000 |
| 60 | Sylvester Patton | Democratic | 1997 (Appt.) |
| 61 | John Boccieri | Democratic | 2000 |
| 62 | Jamie Callender | Republican | 1996 |
| 63 | Ron Young | Republican | |
| 64 | Daniel Sferra | Democratic | 2000 |
| 65 | Sandra Harwood | Democratic | 2002 |
| 66 | Jean Schmidt | Republican | 2000 |
| 67 | Tom Raga | Republican | 2000 |
| 68 | Kathleen Chandler | Democratic | 2002 |
| 69 | Chuck Calvert | Republican | 1998 |
| 70 | Kevin DeWine | Republican | 2000 |
| 71 | David R. Evans | Republican | 1998 (Appt.) |
| 72 | Merle G. Kearns | Republican | 2000 |
| 73 | William J. Hartnett | Democratic | 1998 (Appt.) |
| 74 | Steve Buehrer | Republican | 1998 |
| 75 | Jim Hoops | Republican | 1998 |
| 76 | Mike Gilb | Republican | 2000 |
| 77 | Keith Faber | Republican | 2000 |
| 78 | Derrick Seaver | Republican | 2000 |
| 79 | Diana Fessler | Republican | 2000 |
| 80 | Chris Redfern | Democratic | 1999 (Appt.) |
| 81 | Jeff Wagner | Republican | 2002 |
| 82 | Steve Reinhard | Republican | 2000 |
| 83 | Tony Core | Republican | 1999 (Appt.) |
| 84 | Chris Widener | Republican | 2002 |
| 85 | John M. Schlichter | Republican | 2002 |
| 86 | David T. Daniels | Republican | 2002 |
| 87 | Clyde Evans | Republican | 2002 |
| 88 | Tom Niehaus | Republican | 2000 |
| 89 | Todd Book | Democratic | 2002 |
| 90 | Thom Collier | Republican | 2000 (Appt.) |
| 91 | Larry Householder | Republican | 1996 |
| 92 | Jimmy Stewart | Republican | 2002 |
| 93 | Nancy P. Hollister | Republican | 1999 (Appt.) |
| 94 | Jim Aslanides | Republican | 1999 (Appt.) |
| 95 | John Domenick | Democratic | 2002 |
| 96 | Charlie Wilson | Democratic | 1996 |
| 97 | Bob Gibbs | Republican | 2002 |
| 98 | Tim Grendell | Republican | 2000 |
| 99 | George Distel | Democratic | 1999 (Appt.) |

Appt.- Member was appointed to current House Seat

== See also ==
- Ohio House of Representatives membership, 126th General Assembly
- Ohio House of Representatives membership, 125th General Assembly
