= Ohio House of Representatives membership, 126th General Assembly =

The 126th Ohio General Assembly comprised the state legislature of the U.S. state of Ohio. The Ohio House of Representatives is the lower house of the Ohio General Assembly. Every two years, all of the house seats come up for election. The 126th General Assembly was in session in 2005 and 2006. The party distribution was 61 Republicans and 38 Democrats.

== Make-up of the 126th General Assembly ==
Affiliation	Members
Republican Party	61
Democratic Party	38
Total	99
Government Majority	23

== Leadership ==
=== Majority leadership ===
Office	Name	Party	District	Since
Speaker	Jon Husted	Republican	37th District-Kettering	
Speaker Pro Tempore	Charles R. Blasdel; RUNNING FOR US HOUSE-6TH CD	Republican	1st District-East Liverpool	
Majority Floor Leader	Larry L. Flowers	Republican	19th District-Canal Winchester	
Assistant Majority Floor Leader	Kevin DeWine	Republican	70th District-Fairborn	
Majority Whip	Jim Carmichael	Republican	3rd District-Wooster	
Assistant Majority Whip	Bill Seitz	Republican	30th District--Cincinnati	

=== Minority leadership ===
Office	Name	Party	District	Since
Minority Leader	Joyce Beatty	Democratic	27th District-Columbus	
Assistant Minority Leader	Todd Book	Democratic	89th District-McDermott	
Minority Whip	Steven L. Driehaus	Democratic	31st District-Cincinnati	
Assistant Minority Whip	Fred Strahorn	Democratic	40th District-Dayton	

== Members of the Ohio House of Representatives, 126th General Assembly ==
District	Representative	Party	Home Town, County	First elected
1st District	Charles R. Blasdel (Running for US House-6th CD	Republican	East Liverpool, Columbiana	2000
2nd District	Jon M. Peterson	Republican	Delaware, Delaware	1999 (App)
3rd District	Jim Carmichael	Republican	Wooster, Wayne	2000
4th District	John R. Willamowski (Running for Court of Appeals-3rd District)	Republican	Lima, Allen	
5th District	Tim Schaffer (Running for State Senate-31st SD)	Republican	Lancaster, Fairfield	
6th District	Robert E. Latta	Republican	Bowling Green, Wood	2000
7th District	Kenny Yuko	Democratic	Richmond Heights, Cuyahoga	2004
8th District	Lance T. Mason (Running for State Senate-25th SD)	Democratic	Shaker Heights, Cuyahoga	2000
9th District	Claudette J. Woodard (Retiring)	Democratic	Cleveland Heights, Cuyahoga	
10th District	Shirley A. Smith (Running for State Senate-21st SD)	Democratic	Cleveland, Cuyahoga	
11th District	Annie L. Key	Democratic	Cleveland, Cuyahoga	
12th District	Michael DeBose	Democratic	Cleveland, Cuyahoga	2002 (App)
13th District	Michael J. Skindell	Democratic	Lakewood, Cuyahoga	2002
14th District	Michael Foley	Democratic	Cleveland, Cuyahoga	2006 (App)
15th District	Timothy J. DeGeeter	Democratic	Parma, Cuyahoga	2003 (App)
16th District	Sally Conway Kilbane (Term Limited)	Republican	Rocky River, Cuyahoga	
17th District	James Peter Trakas (Term Limited)	Republican	Independence, Cuyahoga	
18th District	Thomas F. Patton	Republican	Strongsville, Cuyahoga	2002
19th District	Larry L. Flowers	Republican	Canal Winchester, Fairfield/Franklin	2000
20th District	Jim McGregor	Republican	Gahanna, Franklin	2001 (App)
21st District	Linda Reidelbach (Retiring)	Republican	Columbus, Franklin	
22nd District	Jim Hughes	Republican	Columbus, Franklin	2000
23rd District	Larry Wolpert	Republican	Hilliard, Franklin	2000
24th District	Geoffrey C. Smith	Republican	Columbus, Franklin	
25th District	Daniel Stewart	Democratic	Columbus, Franklin	2002
26th District	Mike Mitchell (Defeated in Primary)	Democratic	Columbus, Franklin	2004
27th District	Joyce Beatty	Democratic	Columbus, Franklin	2000 (App)
28th District	Jim Raussen	Republican	Springdale, Hamilton	2002
29th District	Louis W. Blessing Jr.	Republican	Cincinnati, Hamilton	2004
30th District	William J. Seitz	Republican	Cincinnati, Hamilton	
31st District	Steven L. Driehaus	Democratic	Cincinnati, Hamilton	2000
32nd District	Catherine L. Barrett (Term Limited)	Democratic	Cincinnati, Hamilton	
33rd District	Tyrone K. Yates	Democratic	Cincinnati, Hamilton	2002
34th District	Tom Brinkman Jr.	Republican	Cincinnati, Hamilton	2000
35th District	Michelle G. Schneider	Republican	Cincinnati, Hamilton	2000
36th District	Arlene J. Setzer	Republican	Vandalia, Montgomery	2000
37th District	Jon Husted	Republican	Kettering, Montgomery	2000
38th District	John J. White	Republican	Kettering, Montgomery	2000
39th District	Dixie J. Allen (Term Limited)	Republican	Dayton, Montgomery	2006 (App)
40th District	Fred Strahorn	Democratic	Dayton, Montgomery	2000
41st District	Brian G. Williams	Democratic	Akron, Summit	2004
42nd District	John Widowfield	Republican	Cuyahoga Falls, Summit	2001 (App)
43rd District	Mary Taylor (Running for Auditor)	Republican	Green, Summit	
44th District	Barbara A. Sykes (Running for Auditor)	Democratic	Akron, Summit	
45th District	Robert J. Otterman	Democratic	Akron, Summit	
46th District	Mark Wagoner	Republican	Toledo, Lucas	2004
47th District	Peter Ujvagi	Democratic	Toledo, Lucas	2002
48th District	Edna Brown	Democratic	Toledo, Lucas	2001 (App)
49th District	Jeanine Perry (Term Limited)	Democratic	Toledo, Lucas	
50th District	John P. Hagan	Republican	Marlboro Twp., Stark	2000
51st District	W. Scott Oelslager	Republican	Canton, Stark	2002
52nd District	William J. Healy II	Democratic	Canton, Stark	2004
53rd District	Shawn N. Webster	Republican	Millville, Butler	2000
54th District	Courtney E. Combs	Republican	Hamilton, Butler	2004 (App)
55th District	Bill Coley	Republican	West Chester Twp., Butler	2004
56th District	Joseph F. Koziura	Democratic	Lorain, Lorain	2000
57th District	Earl J. Martin	Republican	Avon Lake, Lorain	
58th District	Kathleen L. Walcher (Retiring)	Republican	Norwalk, Huron	
59th District	Kenneth A. Carano Sr.	Democratic	Austintown, Mahoning	
60th District	Sylvester D. Patton Jr. (Term Limited)	Democratic	Youngstown, Mahoning	
61st District	John A. Boccieri (Running for State Senate-33rd SD)	Democratic	New Middletown, Mahoning	
62nd District	Lorraine M. Fende	Democratic	Willowick, Lake	2004
63rd District	Timothy J. Cassell	Democratic	Madison, Lake	2004
64th District	Randy Law	Republican	Warren, Trumbull	2004
65th District	Sandra Stabile Harwood	Democratic	Niles, Trumbull	2002
66th District	Joseph W. Uecker	Republican	Loveland, Clermont	2004
67th District	Tom Raga (Running for Lieutenant Governor)	Republican	Deerfield Township, Warren	2000
68th District	Kathleen Chandler	Democratic	Kent, Portage	2002
69th District	Charles E. Calvert (Term Limited)	Republican	Medina, Medina	
70th District	Kevin DeWine	Republican	Fairborn, Greene	2000
71st District	David R. Evans (Term Limited)	Republican	Newark, Licking	
72nd District	Ross McGregor	Republican	Springfield, Clark	2005 (App)
73rd District	William J. Hartnett (Retiring)	Democratic	Mansfield, Richland	
74th District	Stephen P. Buehrer (Running for State Senate—1st SD)	Republican	Delta, Fulton	1998
75th District	James M. Hoops (Term Limited)	Republican	Napoleon, Henry	
76th District	Michael E. Gilb (Retiring)	Republican	Findlay, Hancock	
77th District	Keith L. Faber	Republican	Celina, Mercer	2001-
78th District	Derrick Seaver (Retiring)	Republican	Minster, Auglaize	2001-
79th District	Diana M. Fessler	Republican	New Carlisle, Clark	2000
80th District	Chris Redfern	Democratic	Port Clinton, Ottawa	2000
81st District	Jeff Wagner	Republican	Sycamore, Seneca	2002
82nd District	Stephen Reinhard	Republican	Bucyrus, Crawford	2000
83rd District	Anthony E. Core	Republican	Rushsylvania, Logan	2000
84th District	Chris Widener	Republican	Springfield, Clark	2002
85th District	John M. Schlichter	Republican	Washington Court House, Fayette	2002
86th District	David T. Daniels	Republican	Greenfield, Highland	2002
87th District	Clyde Evans	Republican	Rio Grande, Gallia	2002
88th District	Danny R. Bubp	Republican	West Union, Adams	2004
89th District	Todd Book	Democratic	McDermott, Scioto	2002
90th District	Thom Collier	Republican	Mount Vernon, Knox	2000 (App)
91st District	Ron Hood (Retiring)	Republican	Canfield, Mahoning	2004
92nd District	Jimmy Stewart	Republican	Athens, Athens	2002
93rd District	Jennifer Garrison	Democratic	Marietta, Washington	2004
94th District	James Aslanides	Republican	Coshocton, Coschocton	2000
95th District	John Domenick	Democratic	Smithfield, Jefferson	2002
96th District	Allan R. Sayre	Democratic	Dover, Tuscarawas	2004
97th District	Bob Gibbs	Republican	Lakeville, Holmes	2002
98th District	Matthew J. Dolan	Republican	Novelty, Geauga	2004
99th District	L. George Distel	Democratic	Conneaut, Ashtabula	2000

== See also ==
- Ohio House of Representatives membership, 125th General Assembly
