= Ohio House of Representatives membership, 125th General Assembly =

The House of Representatives is the lower house of the Ohio General Assembly, which is the state legislature of the U.S. state of Ohio. Every two years, all of the house seats come up for election. The 125th General Assembly was in session in 2003 and 2004. The party distribution was 63 Republicans and 36 Democrats.

== Leadership ==
=== Majority Leadership ===
Office	Name	Party	District	Since
Speaker	Larry Householder	Republican	91st District-Glenford	
Speaker Pro Tempore	Gary W. Cates	Republican	55th District-West Chester Twp.	
Majority Floor Leader	Patricia M. Clancy	Republican	29th District-Cincinnati	
Assistant Majority Floor Leader	Stephen P. Buehrer	Republican	74th District-Delta	
Majority Whip	James Peter Trakas	Republican	17th District-Independence	
Assistant Majority Whip	Jon M. Peterson	Republican	2nd District-Delaware	

=== Minority Leadership ===
Office	Name	Party	District	Since
Minority Leader	Chris Redfern	Democratic	80th District-Port Clinton	
Assistant Minority Leader	Joyce Beatty	Democratic	27th District-Columbus	
Minority Whip	Dale Miller	Democratic	14th District-Cleveland	
Assistant Minority Whip	Lance Mason	Democratic	8th District-Shaker Heights	

== Members of the Ohio House of Representatives, 125th General Assembly ==
District	Representative	Party	Home Town, County	Term of Service
1st District	Charles R. Blasdel	Republican	East Liverpool, Columbiana	
2nd District	Jon M. Peterson	Republican	Delaware, Delaware	
3rd District	Jim Carmichael	Republican	Wooster, Wayne	
4th District	John R. Willamowski	Republican	Lima, Allen	
5th District	Tim Schaffer	Republican	Lancaster, Fairfield	
6th District	Robert E. Latta	Republican	Bowling Green, Wood	
7th District	Edward S. Jerse	Democratic	Euclid, Cuyahoga	-2005
8th District	Lance T. Mason	Democratic	Shaker Heights, Cuyahoga	
9th District	Claudette J. Woodard	Democratic	Cleveland Heights, Cuyahoga	
10th District	Shirley A. Smith	Democratic	Cleveland, Cuyahoga	
11th District	Annie L. Key	Democratic	Cleveland, Cuyahoga	
12th District	Michael DeBose	Democratic	Cleveland, Cuyahoga	
13th District	Michael J. Skindell	Democratic	Lakewood, Cuyahoga	
14th District	Dale Miller	Democratic	Cleveland, Cuyahoga	
15th District	Timothy J. DeGeeter	Democratic	Parma, Cuyahoga	
16th District	Sally Conway Kilbane	Republican	Rocky River, Cuyahoga	
17th District	James Peter Trakas	Republican	Independence, Cuyahoga	
18th District	Thomas F. Patton	Republican	Strongsville, Cuyahoga	
19th District	Larry L. Flowers	Republican	Canal Winchester, Fairfield/Franklin	
20th District	Jim McGregor	Republican	Gahanna, Franklin	
21st District	Linda Reidelbach	Republican	Columbus, Franklin	
22nd District	Jim Hughes	Republican	Columbus, Franklin	
23rd District	Larry Wolpert	Republican	Hilliard, Franklin	
24th District	Geoffrey C. Smith	Republican	Columbus, Franklin	
25th District	Daniel Stewart	Democratic	Columbus, Franklin	
26th District	Larry Price	Democratic	Columbus, Franklin	-2005
27th District	Joyce Beatty	Democratic	Columbus, Franklin	
28th District	Jim Raussen	Republican	Springdale, Hamilton	
29th District	Patricia M. Clancy	Republican	Cincinnati, Hamilton	-2005
30th District	William J. Seitz	Republican	Cincinnati, Hamilton	
31st District	Steven L. Driehaus	Democratic	Cincinnati, Hamilton	
32nd District	Catherine L. Barrett	Democratic	Cincinnati, Hamilton	
33rd District	Tyrone K. Yates	Democratic	Cincinnati, Hamilton	
34th District	Tom Brinkman Jr.	Republican	Cincinnati, Hamilton	
35th District	Michelle G. Schneider	Republican	Cincinnati, Hamilton	
36th District	Arlene J. Setzer	Republican	Vandalia, Montgomery	
37th District	Jon Husted	Republican	Kettering, Montgomery	
38th District	John J. White	Republican	Kettering, Montgomery	
39th District	Dixie J. Allen	Republican	Dayton, Montgomery	
40th District	Fred Strahorn	Democratic	Dayton, Montgomery	
41st District	Marilyn Slaby	Republican	Akron, Summit	
42nd District	John Widowfield	Republican	Cuyahoga Falls, Summit	
43rd District	Mary Taylor	Republican	Green, Summit	
44th District	Barbara A. Sykes	Democratic	Akron, Summit	
45th District	Robert J. Otterman	Democratic	Akron, Summit	
46th District	Lynn E. Olman	Republican	Maumee, Lucas	-2005
47th District	Peter Ujvagi	Democratic	Toledo, Lucas	
48th District	Edna Brown	Democratic	Toledo, Lucas	
49th District	Jeanine Perry	Democratic	Toledo, Lucas	
50th District	John P. Hagan	Republican	Marlboro Twp., Stark	
51st District	W. Scott Oelslager	Republican	Canton, Stark	
52nd District	Mary M. Cirelli	Democratic	Canton, Stark	-2005
53rd District	Shawn N. Webster	Republican	Millville, Butler	
54th District	Courtney E. Combs	Republican	Hamilton, Butler	
55th District	Gary W. Cates	Republican	West Chester Twp., Butler	-2005
56th District	Joseph F. Koziura	Democratic	Lorain, Lorain	
57th District	Earl J. Martin	Republican	Avon Lake, Lorain	
58th District	Kathleen L. Walcher	Republican	Norwalk, Huron	
59th District	Kenneth A. Carano Sr.	Democratic	Austintown, Mahoning	
60th District	Sylvester D. Patton Jr.	Democratic	Youngstown, Mahoning	
61st District	John A. Boccieri	Democratic	New Middletown, Mahoning	
62nd District	Jamie Callender	Republican	Willowick, Lake	-2005
63rd District	Ron Young	Republican	Leroy, Geauga	-2005
64th District	Daniel J. Sferra	Democratic	Warren, Trumbull	2005-
65th District	Sandra Stabile Harwood	Democratic	Niles, Trumbull	;
66th District	Jean Schmidt	Republican	Miami Township, Clermont	-2005
67th District	Tom Raga	Republican	Deerfield Township, Warren	
68th District	Kathleen Chandler	Democratic	Kent, Portage	
69th District	Charles E. Calvert	Republican	Medina, Medina	
70th District	Kevin DeWine	Republican	Fairborn, Greene	
71st District	David R. Evans	Republican	Newark, Licking	
72nd District	Merle Grace Kearns	Republican	Springfield, Clark	
73rd District	William J. Hartnett	Democratic	Mansfield, Richland	
74th District	Stephen P. Buehrer	Republican	Delta, Fulton	
75th District	James M. Hoops	Republican	Napoleon, Henry	
76th District	Michael E. Gilb	Republican	Findlay, Hancock	
77th District	Keith L. Faber	Republican	Celina, Mercer	
78th District	Derrick Seaver	Democratic (switched to Republican on 11 zz18zz 2004)	Minster, Auglaize	
79th District	Diana M. Fessler	Republican	New Carlisle, Clark	
80th District	Chris Redfern	Democratic	Port Clinton, Ottawa	
81st District	Jeff Wagner	Republican	Sycamore, Seneca	
82nd District	Stephen Reinhard	Republican	Bucyrus, Crawford	
83rd District	Anthony E. Core	Republican	Rushsylvania, Logan	
84th District	Chris Widener	Republican	Springfield, Clark	
85th District	John M. Schlichter	Republican	Washington Court House, Fayette	
86th District	David T. Daniels	Republican	Greenfield, Highland	
87th District	Clyde Evans	Republican	Rio Grande, Gallia	
88th District	Tom Niehaus	Republican	New Richmond, Clermont	-2005
89th District	Todd Book	Democratic	McDermott, Scioto	
90th District	Thom Collier	Republican	Mount Vernon, Knox	
91st District	Larry Householder	Republican	Glenford, Perry	-2005
92nd District	Jimmy Stewart	Republican	Athens, Athens	
93rd District	Nancy P. Hollister	Republican	Marietta, Washington	-2005
94th District	James Aslanides	Republican	Coshocton, Coschocton	
95th District	John Domenick	Democratic	Smithfield, Jefferson	
96th District	Charles A. Wilson Jr.	Democratic	Bridgeport, Belmont	-2005
97th District	Bob Gibbs	Republican	Lakeville, Holmes <	
98th District	Timothy J. Grendell	Republican	Chesterland, Geauga	-2005
99th District	L. George Distel	Democratic	Conneaut, Ashtabula	

=== References ===
1. Ohio State Legislature Digital Record (offline, waybackmachine retrieval February 6, 2024) https://web.archive.org/web/20111108071246/http://www.legislature.state.oh.us/JournalText125/HJ-01-06-03.pdf
