= Ted Celeste =

American politician

- Celeste in 2009

Member of the Ohio House of Representatives from the 24th district
- In office January 2, 2007 – December 31, 2012
- Preceded by: Geoffrey C. Smith
- Succeeded by: Stephanie Kunze

Personal details
- Born: September 27, 1945 (age 80) Lakewood, Ohio, U.S.
- Party: Democratic
- Education: College of Wooster
- Profession: Peace Corps, Real Estate

Theodore S. Celeste (born September 27, 1945) is an American businessman and former politician. He is a member of the Democratic Party. After serving in the Peace Corps, Celeste, the brother of former Ohio governor and U.S. ambassador Dick Celeste, ran for the U.S. Senate in 2000 and lost to the Republican incumbent Mike DeWine. In 2006, Celeste was elected State Representative of Ohio's 24th District, and served until 2012.

== Early life, education, and business career ==
After graduating from the College of Wooster, Celeste and his wife taught school in Fiji via the Peace Corps. Following that, he served as acting chief of the Bureau of Consumer Services in the Ohio Department of Public Welfare and then in the Ohio Department of Finance.

A former real estate developer, Celeste helped chair Governor and brother Dick Celeste's gubernatorial campaigns Ted Strickland's 2006 gubernatorial campaign. Celeste also served for nine years on The Ohio State University Board of Trustees.

== 2000 U.S. Senate election ==
He ran for the U.S. Senate for the seat held by Republican U.S. Senator Mike DeWine. In the Democratic primary, he defeated perennial candidate Marvin McMickle, former State Representative Richard Cordray, and activist Daniel Radakovich 44%-24%-24%-8%. He won all but five counties: Pike, Pickaway, Franklin, Madison, and Cuyahoga counties. Cordray defeated Celeste in his home county (Franklin) 49%-34%. In the general election, DeWine won re-election to a second term by defeating Celeste by a landslide 60%-36%, while Republican Governor George W. Bush defeated Democratic Vice President Al Gore in Ohio 50%-47%.

== Ohio House of Representatives ==
=== Elections ===
In 2006, incumbent Republican Geoffrey C. Smith was seen as vulnerable, and Celeste entered the Ohio House race to try and unseat him. However, despite his name recognition, Celeste faced a four-way primary in 2006. He ended up winning 67% of the electorate. In the general election of that year, Republicans began to run negatively against Celeste, yet he vowed to stay positive in his campaigning. In the end, Celeste ended up defeating Smith, winning by about 4,300 votes.

Early on in the 2008 cycle, Celeste was in considerations for leadership if the House were to go into Democratic hands. However, he faced strong opposition for caucus leader from Todd Book and Armond Budish. In the 2008 general election Republicans looked to take back the district, and fielded attorney Timothy Rankin to take on Celeste. Celeste won a second term by around 9,000 votes.

Less vulnerable in 2010 but still contentious, Celeste faced Republican Nathan Larger. However, the race proved to be closer than anticipated, and Celeste won by less than 3,000 votes.

=== Tenure ===
In the end, Budish defeated Celeste, Book, and Matt Szollosi to take the Speaker position.

Celeste was vocal about concerns regarding a bill to replace overtime with comp time. "I think we've gone in the wrong direction," he said before voting against the bill.

Along with Nickie Antonio, Celeste has introduced legislation to end the death penalty in Ohio. Celeste has cited the financial burden that death row brings to the taxpayers, and that there should be a discussion on the death penalty included in the upcoming budget deliberations. Celeste has pointed to evidence that the penalty has been discriminatory toward minorities.

Celeste has stated that he believes Republicans have embarked upon a "starve the beast" strategy, with their main intent being to hurt the future financial support of the Democratic Party with Senate Bill 5, and the voter-ID bill will make it harder for the traditional base to collect votes. He also stated the influence they will be able to gain through redistricting.

With Andrew Brenner, Celeste has sponsored a bill that aims to support children with dyslexia. His legislation sought to demonstrate and evaluate the effectiveness of early reading assistance programs for children with dyslexia and to evaluate whether those programs can reduce future special education costs.

=== Committee assignments ===
He was named Chairman of the House Alternative Energy Committee, and the Higher Education Subcommittee of the House Finance and Appropriations Committee. Currently, he serves on the committees of Health and Aging; Economic and Small Business Development; Education; and State Government and Elections.

== 2012 congressional election ==
In November 2011, he decided to retire from the Ohio House to run for the newly redrawn Ohio's 3rd congressional district, based in Columbus. Celeste placed last out of four contenders.

Party political offices
Preceded by Joel Hyatt	Democratic nominee for U.S. Senator from Ohio (Class 1); 2000	Succeeded by Sherrod Brown
