= Mike Moran (politician) =

American politician

Member of the Ohio House of Representatives from the 42nd district
- In office January 5, 2009 – December 31, 2010
- Preceded by: Richard Nero
- Succeeded by: Kristina Roegner

Personal details
- Party: Democrat
- Education: Georgetown University
- Profession: Attorney

Mike Moran is a former Democratic member of the Ohio House of Representatives, representing the 42nd District from 2009 to 2010. A former member of Hudson City Council, Moran ran for state representative in 2008 against incumbent John Widowfield. However, when Widowfield resigned, it allowed Republicans to replace him with Richard Nero, a political newcomer. However, Democrats still attempted to win the seat. On election day, Moran defeated Nero, and was sworn into office on January 5, 2009. He became an influential member of the freshman class of 2009.

However, from the day he was sworn in, Moran was a top target for Republicans. Up for reelection in 2010, Moran faced no opposition in the primary election. However, Kristina Roegner, who had served on city council with Moran, entered the race as a Republican to try to unseat Moran. In an overwhelmingly Republican year, Moran was defeated by Roegner.

Following his defeat, Moran returned to the private sector as a lawyer.
