= Sandra Harwood =

American politician (born 1950)

Member of the Ohio House of Representatives from the 65th district
- In office 2003–2011

Personal details
- Born: 1950 (age 75–76)
- Party: Democratic
- Education: University of Akron School of Law
- Alma mater: Kent State University

Sandra Stabile Harwood (born 1950) is an American politician and judge from Ohio. She was a Democrat and represented District 65 in the Ohio House of Representatives.

In 2024, she retired from the Trumbull County Family Court.

== See also ==
- Ohio House of Representatives membership, 125th General Assembly
- Ohio House of Representatives membership, 126th General Assembly
- Ohio House of Representatives, 127th General Assembly
- 128th Ohio General Assembly
- 127th Ohio General Assembly
- 126th Ohio General Assembly
- 125th Ohio General Assembly
