= William G. Batchelder =

American politician (1942–2022)

Bill Batchelder
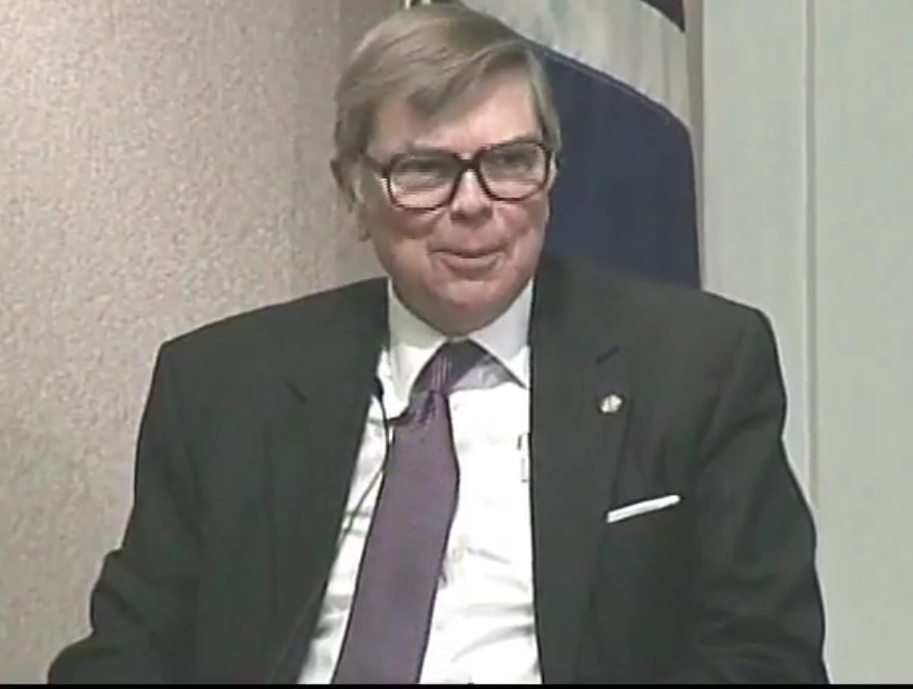
- Batchelder at the City Club of Cleveland, 2011

101st Speaker of the Ohio House of Representatives
- In office January 3, 2011 – December 31, 2014
- Preceded by: Armond Budish
- Succeeded by: Cliff Rosenberger

Minority Leader of the Ohio House of Representatives
- In office January 5, 2009 – January 3, 2011
- Preceded by: Joyce Beatty
- Succeeded by: Armond Budish

Member of the Ohio House of Representatives from the 69th district
- In office January 2, 2007 – December 31, 2014
- Preceded by: Chuck Calvert
- Succeeded by: Steve Hambley
- In office January 3, 1969 – December 31, 1998
- Preceded by: Dennis Dannley
- Succeeded by: Chuck Calvert

Personal details
- Born: December 19, 1942 Medina, Ohio, U.S.
- Died: February 12, 2022 (aged 79) Medina, Ohio, U.S.
- Party: Republican
- Spouse: Alice Moore (m. 1966)
- Children: 2
- Education: Ohio Wesleyan University (BA); Ohio State University (JD)

William G. Batchelder III (December 19, 1942 – February 12, 2022) was an American politician who was the 101st Speaker of the Ohio House of Representatives, serving from 2011 to 2014. He also represented the 69th District of the Ohio House of Representatives from 2007 to 2014, and served in the House from 1969 to 1998 previously. He was a Republican.

== Early life and legal career ==
Batchelder was born in Medina, Ohio, and grew up in the town, graduating from Medina High School. He earned his undergraduate degree in history at Ohio Wesleyan University and his J.D. from the Ohio State University College of Law. In law school he was a member of the moot court team.

He began his public service career as an aide to and protege of the late Ohio Lt. Governor John W. Brown, who was from his home town of Medina. Batchelder was elected to the Ohio House of Representatives while on active duty with the United States Army. He served in the office of the Judge Advocate General at the headquarters of the Third Army in Fort McPherson, Georgia; he was honorably discharged in 1974.

Batchelder practiced law in Medina, Ohio for 31 years with the law firm of Williams & Batchelder. His practice focused on personal injury defense litigation, corporate law, probate, and estate planning. Batchelder was elected to the Medina County Court of Common Pleas and served briefly on that court before Governor Bob Taft appointed him to the Ninth District Ohio Court of Appeals. Batchelder was elected to the appellate bench in November 2000. He served as presiding judge from January 2000 to December 2001.

He had been selected by the Supreme Court of Ohio to serve on the Ohio Board of Bar Examiners. He was the recipient of the Ohio State Bar Public Service Award and an honorary graduate of the University of Akron School of Law. Batchelder had been a member of the Criminal Justice Advisory Board, Office of Criminal Justice Services, Ohio Court of Appeals Association and the Ohio, Akron, Lorain County, Medina County, and Wayne County Bar Associations. He served as an adjunct professor of law at the University of Akron School of Law and at the College of Urban Affairs of Cleveland State University.

== Ohio House of Representatives ==
Batchelder served in the Ohio House of Representatives for more than 30 years, serving as chairman of the Joint Committee on Ethics and Vice-Chairman of the Criminal Justice Committee, as well as ranking member at various times on the House Judiciary Committee and House Financial Institutions Committee. From 1995 to 1998, Batchelder served as Speaker Pro Tempore of the House and Vice-Chairman of the Reference and Rules Committee.

During the Savings and Loan Crisis in the 1980s, Batchelder worked with Democratic Governor Dick Celeste to draft legislation to save depositors' savings at stricken Savings and loan associations, causing Celeste to thank Batchelder during his State of the State speech. During the pay-to-play scandal of the mid 1990s, as chair of the Joint Committee on Ethics, Batchelder referred both the Republican President of the Ohio Senate and the Democratic Ohio Speaker of the House to a prosecutor; both were convicted. He is the only ethics committee chair ever to have referred the heads of both legislative chambers to a prosecutor.

After leaving the bench in 2005, Batchelder again was elected to the state House of Representatives in 2006, defeating Jack Schira. He would be reelected in 2008. By 2009, Batchelder was serving as Minority Leader, and when Republicans retook the Ohio House in 2010, he was elected as the 101st Speaker of the Ohio House of Representatives. He would remain as Speaker for the 130th Ohio General Assembly, and was term-limited in 2014.

== Personal life and death ==
Batchelder was married to Judge Alice M. Batchelder (née Moore), who is on senior status as a federal judge on the United States Court of Appeals for the Sixth Circuit. They were married in 1966 and had two children. He died at a retirement community in Medina on February 12, 2022, at the age of 79.

== Electoral history ==
Ohio House of Representatives 69th District: Results 2006–2012
| Year | Democrat | Votes | Pct | Republican | Votes | Pct |
|---|---|---|---|---|---|---|
| 2006 | Jack Schira | 21,116 | 44.53% | William G. Batchelder | 26,302 | 55.47% |
| 2008 | Jack Schira | 22,505 | 36.78% | William G. Batchelder | 38,684 | 63.22% |
| 2010 | Jack Schira | 13,666 | 29.66% | William G. Batchelder | 32,406 | 70.34 % |
| 2012 | Judith Cross | 23,047 | 39.37% | William G. Batchelder | 35,486 | 60.63% |
