= Charles Brading =

American pharmacist and politician (1935–2016)

Member of the Ohio House of Representatives from the 86th district
- In office January 3, 1993 – December 31, 2000
- Preceded by: Jon Stozich
- Succeeded by: Mike Gilb

Personal details
- Born: February 19, 1935 Wapakoneta, Ohio, U.S.
- Died: September 30, 2016 (aged 81) Celina, Ohio, U.S.
- Party: Republican
- Spouse: Sandra Berry
- Children: three
- Education: Ohio Northern University
- Occupation: pharmacist

Charles Richard Brading (February 19, 1935 – September 30, 2016) was an American pharmacist and politician.

Born in Wapakoneta, Ohio, Brading graduated from Ohio Northern University with a degree in pharmacy. He owned Rhine and Brading Pharmacy in Wapakoneta. He served on the Wapakoneta City Council and was president of the city council. Then, he served as mayor of Wapakoneta from 1988 to 1991. Brading served in the Ohio House of Representatives from 1993 to 2000 and was a Republican. His district consisted of an area circled around Findlay, Ohio. He was succeeded by Mike Gilb.
