= Stephanie Howse =

American politician (born 1979)

Member of Cleveland City Council from Ward 7
- Incumbent
- Assumed office January 3, 2022
- Preceded by: Basheer Jones
- In office August 18, 2008 – November 26, 2008
- Preceded by: Fannie Lewis
- Succeeded by: TJ Dow

Member of the Ohio House of Representatives from the 11th district
- In office January 3, 2015 – January 2, 2022
- Preceded by: Sandra Williams
- Succeeded by: Shayla Davis

Personal details
- Born: August 21, 1979 (age 47)
- Party: Democratic
- Relations: Annie L. Key (mother)
- Education: Florida A&M University (BS); Cleveland State University (MS)

Stephanie D. Howse (born August 21, 1979) is an American politician serving as a member of the Cleveland City Council from the 7th ward. She was previously a member of the Ohio House of Representatives from 2015 to 2022.

== Early life and education ==
Howse was raised in Cleveland, and is the daughter of former Representative Annie L. Key. Howse is a graduate of the Cleveland School of the Arts, where she studied vocal and instrumental music. After high school, Howse earned a Bachelor of Science degree in civil and environmental engineering from Florida A&M University and a Master of Science in environmental studies from Cleveland State University.

== Career ==
Howse briefly served as a member of the Cleveland City Council in 2008. From 2015 to 2022, she represented the 11th district of the Ohio House of Representatives. In 2021, Howse was elected to the Cleveland City Council and resigned from the House.
