= Charleta Tavares =

American politician

Charleta B. Tavares
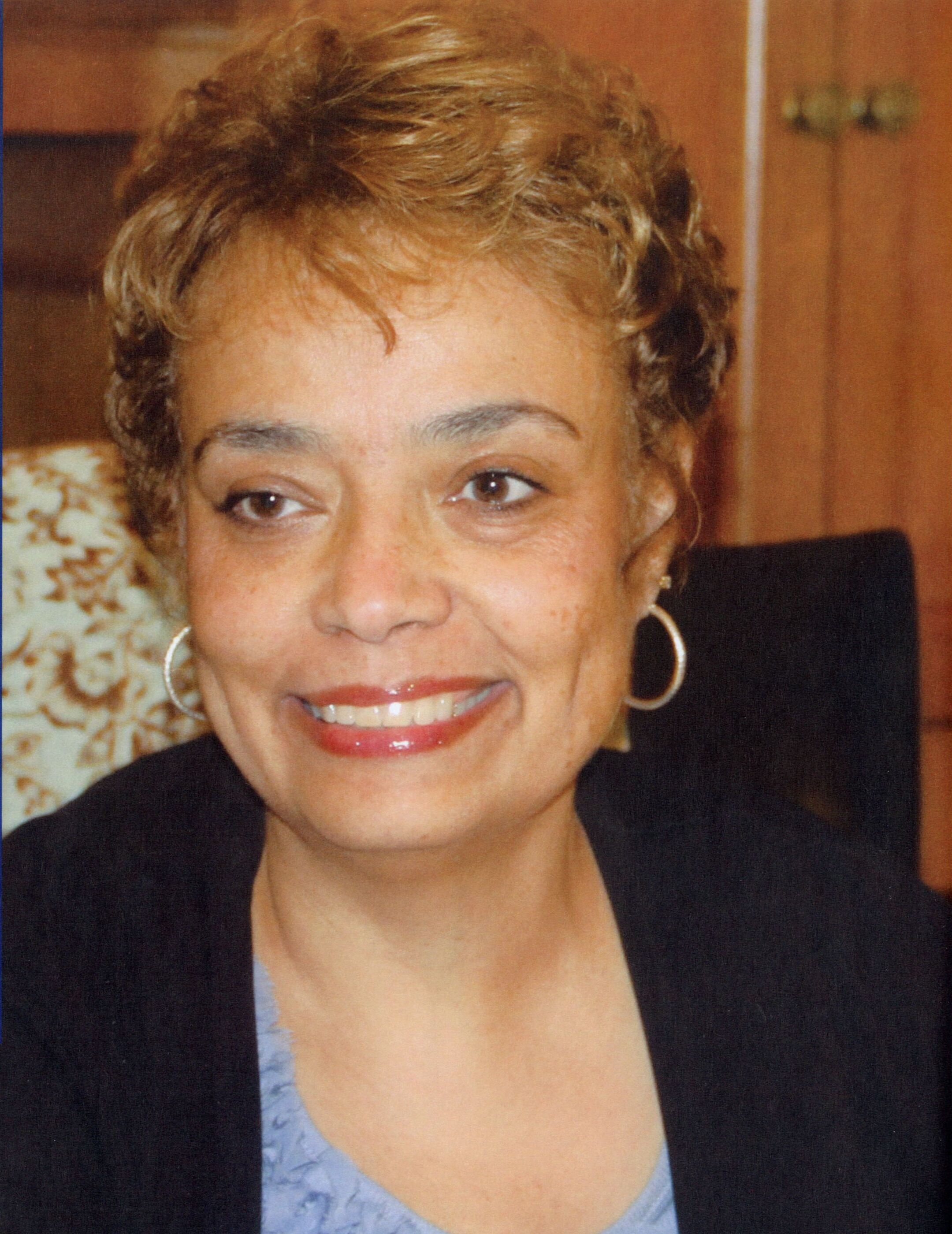

Member of the Ohio Senate from the 15th district
- In office January 1, 2011 – December 31, 2018
- Preceded by: Ray Miller
- Succeeded by: Hearcel Craig

Member of the Ohio House of Representatives from the 22nd district
- In office July 1, 1993 – December 31, 1998
- Preceded by: Ray Miller
- Succeeded by: Ray Miller

Personal details
- Party: Democratic
- Education: Eastmoor High School; Spelman College; Ohio State University
- Profession: Legislator and non-profit President/CEO

Charleta B. Tavares is a former member of the Ohio Senate. She represented the 15th District from 2011 to 2018. Her district included much of central Franklin County, including the cities of Bexley and Grandview Heights with the majority encompassing the historic neighborhoods of Columbus, Ohio. Tavares previously had served in the Ohio House of Representatives from 1993 to 1998.

== Life and career ==
Tavares has an extensive public service career starting as the Legislative Assistant to Ray Miller in the Ohio House of Representatives. She also served as Chief of the Children's Protection Section for Ohio Attorney General Lee Fisher prior to her appointment in 1993, as state Representative and the first African-American and Democratic woman to serve in the Legislature from Franklin County in the state's history. Tavares was elected in 1994 and served until 1998. She was elected by her colleagues in 1996 to serve as Minority Whip, making her the first African-American woman ever to hold a leadership position in the Ohio Legislature.

In 1998, Tavares gave up her seat to run unsuccessfully for Ohio Secretary of State. The Republican, J. Kenneth Blackwell won the election. However, Tavares was appointed to Columbus City Council in 1999, and won re-election that year.

Tavares was asked by the Democratic Party in 2002 to run as lieutenant governor with her running mate, Tim Hagan who was nominated to run for governor. They lost the election. She won re-election to City Council in 2003 and 2007.

== Ohio Senate ==
In 2010, Senator Ray Miller was term limited and unable to run for another term in the Ohio Senate. As a result, Tavares, Representative Dan Stewart, and politician novice Oyango Snell ran to replace him. Tavares won the Democratic primary nomination with 52.39% of the vote. She went on to defeat Republican Alicia Healy with 72.8% of the vote.

On January 3, 2011, Tavares was sworn into her first term in the Senate and once again became both the first Democratic and African-American woman to serve in the Ohio Senate from Central Ohio. She is also the first woman Democrat to serve in leadership in both the Ohio House of Representatives and Ohio Senate in Ohio's history.

In 2014, Tavares was elected as Assistant Senate Democratic Leader. She was re-elected to the Senate 15th District in 2014 with over 73% of the vote. She was also re-elected to her leadership post. Tavares's legislative agenda includes providing benefits and protections for domestic workers, eliminating health disparities, eliminating disparities caused by school expulsions and suspensions, investing in Ohio's infrastructure, and creating equity and racial fairness in the judicial system. She has been an advocate for raising the minimum wage, and for a refundable earned income tax credit.

=== Committee assignments ===
Committee on Rules; Ways & Means (Ranking Member); Health and Human Services (Ranking Member); Finance; and Corrections Subcommittee (Finance). She was also appointed to the Joint Committee on Agency Rule Review (JCARR), Joint Medicaid Oversight Committee (JMOC), and the Constitutional Modernization Commission (co-chair).

== Electoral history ==
Election results
Year	Office	Election	Votes for Tavares	%	Opponent	Party	Votes	%
1994	Ohio House of Representatives	General	23,866	100%				
1996	Ohio House of Representatives	General	23,427	73.81%	David Glenn	Republican	8,311	28.19%
1998	Ohio Secretary of State	General	1,404,081	43.97%	Ken Blackwell	Republican	1,789,105	56.03%
1999	Columbus City Council	General	72,396	15.32%				
2002	Ohio Lieutenant Governor	General	1,236,924	38.31%	Jennette Bradley	Republican	1,865,007	57.76%
2003	Columbus City Council	General	52,073	16.16%				
2007	Columbus City Council	General	60,833	17.83%				
2010	Ohio Senate	General	60,563	72.32%	Alicia Healy	Republican	23,183	27.68%
2014	Ohio Senate	General	53,258	76.39%	Joe Healy	Republican	16,461	23.61%

Party political offices
Preceded by Dan Brady	Democratic nominee for Ohio Secretary of State; 1998	Succeeded by Bryan Flannery
Preceded by Michael B. Coleman	Democratic nominee for Lieutenant Governor of Ohio; 2002	Succeeded by Lee Fisher
