= Margaret Ruhl =

American politician

Margaret Ann Ruhl
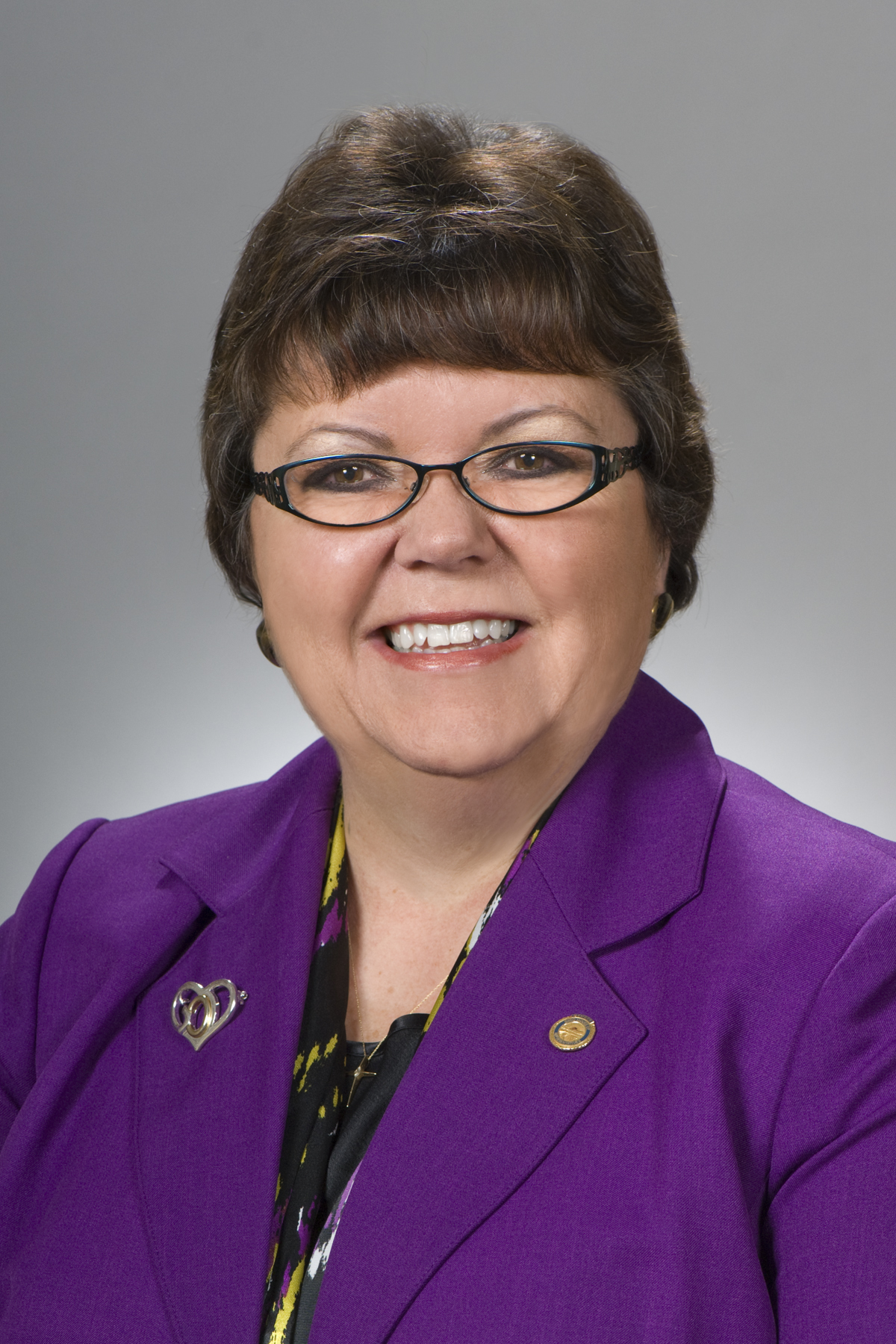

Member of the Ohio House of Representatives from the 68th district
- In office January 5, 2009-December 31, 2016
- Preceded by: Thom Collier
- Succeeded by: Rick Carfagna

Personal details
- Born: September 2, 1956 (age 70) Knox County, Ohio, U.S.
- Party: Republican
- Education: Fredericktown High School
- Profession: Auditor

Margaret Ann Ruhl (born September 2, 1956) is a Republican politician who formerly represented the 68th District of the Ohio House of Representatives, which includes Knox County and the eastern portion of Delaware County.

== Life and career ==
A lifelong resident of Knox County, Ohio, Ruhl graduated from Fredericktown High School. She went on to begin a career in business and accounting, and eventually served as city auditor for Mount Vernon, Ohio, from 1983 to 1995. In 1995, Ruhl was elected Knox County Auditor. She served as auditor from 1995 to 2008 before she was elected to the Ohio House of Representatives in 2009.

== Ohio House of Representatives ==
When Representative Thom Collier was term limited from the Statehouse in 2008, Ruhl ran for the open seat. A decisively Republican district, Ruhl initially faced Tom Whiston in the Republican Primary, and won with 53.71%. She defeated Democrat Duane Grassbaugh by 55.16% of the vote in an overwhelmingly Democratic year.

In 2010, Ruhl ran for a second term. Again Ruhl faced a primary challenge by Patrick Quinn, but again won with 64.59% of the vote. She went on to defeat Democrat John Ryerson with 72.26% of the vote.
