= Richard Nero =

American politician

Member of the Ohio House of Representatives from the 42nd district
- In office June 12, 2008 – December 31, 2008
- Preceded by: John Widowfield
- Succeeded by: Mike Moran

Personal details
- Born: April 5, 1971 (age 55) Akron, Ohio
- Party: Republican
- Education: Kent State University
- Profession: Attorney

Richard Nero (born April 5, 1971) is a former Republican member of the Ohio House of Representatives, who represented the 42nd District briefly in 2008.

== Life and career ==
Nero is a graduate of Kent State University, and has worked for Oracle, which is a computer software company. He also has worked in the past for Cleveland State University. He is married with two children.

== Ohio House of Representatives ==
Former Ohio House Representative John Widowfield resigned his seat in 2008, allowing House Republicans to name a replacement through appointment. Nero sought the seat, and was named the replacement. He was sworn into office on June 12, 2008.

With the seat up for election in 2008, Nero had to run for election to a full term to retain the seat. However, with the year favoring Democrats, and with Barack Obama topping the ballot, Nero was defeated by Mike Moran, a Democrat. The final tally was 55.87% to 44.13%.

Nero spent six months in the Ohio House. He has since returned to the private sector.
