= Sandra Williams (American politician) =

Ohio politician

Member of the Ohio Senate from the 21st district
- In office January 5, 2015 – June 1, 2022
- Preceded by: Shirley Smith
- Succeeded by: Dale Martin

Member of the Ohio House of Representatives from the 11th district
- In office January 2, 2007 - December 31, 2014
- Preceded by: Annie L. Key
- Succeeded by: Stephanie Howse

Personal details
- Born: Cleveland, Ohio
- Party: Democratic
- Education: Cleveland State University, Tiffin University

Sandra R. Williams is a former Democratic member of the Ohio Senate who served the 21st district from 2015 to 2022. She also formerly served in the Ohio House of Representatives from 2007 to 2014. Her district includes the eastern two-thirds of Cleveland, as well as the east-side suburbs of Bratenahl, Cleveland Heights, Garfield Heights, Newburgh Heights, Shaker Heights and University Heights.

== FirstEnergy scandal ==
As a member of the Ohio Senate, Williams co-sponsored House Bill 6 (HB 6), the 2019 energy law later tied to what prosecutors described as the largest corruption scandal in Ohio history. The $60 million bribery and racketeering scheme, centered on former House Speaker Larry Householder, was funded by FirstEnergy Corporation.

According to campaign finance records, Williams received $10,000 from the FirstEnergy political action committee in 2017, along with additional contributions in subsequent years, during the period leading up to and following the passage of HB 6.

HB 6 authorized a $1.3 billion ratepayer-funded bailout for two nuclear plants formerly owned by a FirstEnergy subsidiary.

Williams was not charged in the federal bribery case. However, her co-sponsorship of HB 6 and campaign contributions from FirstEnergy drew scrutiny from watchdog groups, who cited them as evidence of the utility’s wide-ranging influence on Ohio's legislature.

== Early life and education ==
A native of Cleveland, Williams attended Cleveland State University and Tiffin University.

== Career ==
Williams worked in the field of criminal justice as a corrections officer, probation officer, parole officer and mediator. She served as a member of the United States Army Reserve from 1987 to 1995. She also worked in the statehouse as a legislative aide for her predecessor in the Ohio House of Representatives, Annie L. Key.

=== Ohio House of Representatives ===
After Key decided not seek reelection in 2006, Williams ran for the safely Democratic seat. She won the Democratic primary with 30.38% of the vote in a field of six candidates, and was unopposed in the November general election. In 2008, Williams was unopposed in the March Democratic primary, and won the general election with 85.45% of the vote against Republican Rosalind McAllister.

In 2009, Williams was elected president of the Ohio Legislative Black Caucus, and served in that capacity through the 130th General Assembly. Speaker Armond Budish also named Williams as chairman of the Economic Development Committee for the 128th General Assembly. She also served as vice chairman of the Public Utilities Committee.

In 2010, Williams was again unopposed in the March Democratic primary, and again defeated challenger Rosalind McAllister with 82.24% of the vote. Williams won election to a final term in 2012 by defeating challenger Tony Perry in the primary with 81.07% of the vote. She was unopposed in the general election.

On October 31, 2014, Williams pleaded no contest in Franklin County Municipal Court to two first-degree misdemeanor charges: one count of illegal conversion of campaign funds and one count of filing a false report. The charges pertained to her having, in 2010, sold Ohio State University football tickets that had been purchased with campaign funds to an associate, retained the proceeds for personal use, and failed to properly report the transaction on her campaign finance reports. The illegal activity was discovered as a consequence of an FBI investigation of payday lending lobbying activity at the Ohio Statehouse. Prior to her conviction, Williams voluntarily reimbursed her campaign for the value of the tickets. In early December 2014, Williams was fined $2000 after having been found guilty of both charges.

=== Ohio Senate ===
In 2014, Williams faced term limits in the House and decided to run for the Ohio Senate to replace Senator Shirley Smith, who was also term-limited. In the Democratic primary, Williams pulled 84.45% of the vote in a three-way race, and went on to win the general election with 86% of the vote.

As a member of the Senate, Williams served on a new task force seeking to improve relations between Ohio communities and their police departments, formed by Ohio Governor John Kasich.

She resigned from the Ohio Senate on June 1, 2022 and took a job in the private sector.

=== Mayoral campaign ===
In May 2021, Williams announced her candidacy in the upcoming Cleveland mayoral election after incumbent Mayor Frank G. Jackson announced his retirement. In the September 14 primary, Williams was eliminated after placing 6th with just over 11% of the vote. She was the only female candidate in the race, and, if elected, would have been the first African-American woman to serve as mayor of Cleveland.

== Policy and positions ==
Williams has been a vocal critic of Governor John Kasich's lack of diversity upon choosing his cabinet, stating, "I would hope that Kasich would understand that this state is very diverse.... African-Americans, as well as other minorities, make up a significant portion of the state's population and his cabinet, as well as his staff, should reflect that." She also has stated that there is a "strong possibility" that Gov. Kasich and the GOP-controlled legislature would curtail efforts to expand minority business contracting.

A staunch opponent of collective bargaining reform brought forth in S.B. 5, Williams believes that Republicans could risk defeat if they continued with the bill.

As chairperson of the Legislative Black Caucus, Williams was vocal about a controversial initiative that would require a photo ID to cast a ballot. She believes that doing so would "disenfranchise" minority voters from participating in an election. She has called it an intentional attack on the Democratic Party.

In April, 2011, Williams made news when citizens concerned about Governor Kasich's proposed budget tried to visit legislators' Columbus offices and were stopped by state troopers and a police dog. Williams, who had an appointment scheduled with the group, said the dog was unnecessary and intimidating.

In one of her first initiatives in the Senate, Williams proposed workforce training measures.

== Electoral history ==
2021 Cleveland mayoral election primary election results
Party	Candidate	Votes	%
Nonpartisan	Justin Bibb	10,901	27.22%
Nonpartisan	Kevin Kelley	7,702	19.23%
Nonpartisan	Dennis Kucinich	6,595	16.47%
Nonpartisan	Zack Reed	4,840	12.08%
Nonpartisan	Basheer Jones	4,801	11.99%
Nonpartisan	Sandra Williams	4,472	11.42%
Nonpartisan	Ross DiBello	639	1.60%
Total votes		40,172	100.00

Ohio Senate 21st District: Results 2014
Year	Democrat	Votes	Pct	Republican	Votes	Pct
2014	Sandra Williams	62,130	86.53%	Sikiru Safaru	9,673	13.47%

Ohio House 11th District: Results 2006 to 2012
Year	Democrat	Votes	Pct	Republican	Votes	Pct
2006	Sandra Williams	16,194	100.00%			
2008	Sandra Williams	26,488	85.37%	Rosalind McAllister	4,540	14.63%
2010	Sandra Williams	14,466	81.65%	Rosalind McAllister	3,253	18.36%
2012	Sandra Williams	26,238	100.00%			
