= Matt Lundy =

American politician

Member-elect of the Ohio House of Representatives from the 53rd district
- Assuming office January 1, 2027
- Succeeding: Joe Miller

Member of the Ohio House of Representatives from the 55th district
- In office January 2, 2007-December 31, 2014
- Preceded by: Earl Martin
- Succeeded by: Nathan Manning

Personal details
- Born: January 4, 1960 (age 66) Pittsburgh, Pennsylvania
- Party: Democratic
- Education: Lorain County Community College, Friends University
- Profession: Full-time Legislator/Former Investigative-Reporter/Anchor

Matt Lundy (born January 4, 1960) is a former Democratic Party member of the Ohio House of Representatives, who represented the 55th District from 2007 to 2014. Since 2015, he has served as a member of the Lorain County Board of County Commissioners.

== Career ==
Lundy holds an associate degree from Lorain County Community College and a bachelor's degree in human resource management from Friends University in Wichita, Kansas. At Avon Lake High School during the 1970s, Lundy hosted a radio show on WLRO 1380 in Lorain, Ohio. He was later terminated for discussing unionizing radio announcers in the county.By the age of 24, Lundy was anchoring the 11:00 p.m. news on a Toledo, Ohio television station. Lundy made other stops during his television career in Utah, Tennessee, Mississippi and North Carolina. Lundy later served as the statewide political correspondent for a four-station group in West Virginia.

His first public service job was on Avon Lake's City Council from 1994 to 1995. Later, Lundy began serving under Elyria Mayor Bill Grace as assistant safety/service director. He served in that capacity until being elected to the Ohio House of Representatives.

== Ohio House of Representatives ==
In 2006, incumbent Earl Martin, who had been appointed, was seen as vulnerable by Democrats. Lundy, in a primary battle with Alan Caruso, won 68.82% of the vote to face in incumbent in the general election. The race became contentious, when a local property dispute involving Martin became public. Lundy beat Martin, taking 56.23% of the vote.

For his first reelection bid in 2008, Lundy was targeted hard by the Republican Party who sought to take the district back, and Avon City Councilman Daniel Urban was nominated to run against Lundy. Lundy won reelection with 57.61% of the vote. For the 128th General Assembly, Speaker of the House Armond Budish named Lundy Chairman of the Consumer Affairs & Economic Protection Committee.

With his second reelection bid, Lundy hung on to his seat against Republican Rae Brady by winning 50.88% of the vote. He is serving on the committees of Finance and Appropriations and its Primary and Secondary Education Subcommittee (as ranking member), Local Government, Education, and State Government and Elections.

Lundy won a final term in 2012 with 62.68% of the vote over Republican Rae Brady. Lundy was term-limited in 2014.

Matt is now the Outreach Coordinator for the Grafton Midview Public Library as of 2024.

== Initiatives, policies and positions ==
With Republicans proposing to privatize the Ohio Department of Development, Lundy has asked the Ohio Ethics Commission to weigh in on the proposal, which he said would exempt the entity from many of the disclosure and oversight measures typical for agencies that spend public money. Lundy raised similar questions after a gubernatorial proposal to privatize prisons, citing that Governor John Kasich's cabinet has individuals who formerly worked in the private prison industry. His questions were answered by the Ohio Ethics Commission as stating that he met ethics requirements. Upon hearing Lundy's concerns, OEC ruled that there was not a conflict of interest with the director.

He has also cited other reasons against privatization, specifically calling the selling of five or possibly six prisons to private operators is "profitization, not privatization."

His initiative, the "Taxpayers' Right to Know Act", would address concerns about the Republican governor's proposed JobsOhio entity being exempt from certain public records and open meetings laws. "As long as public dollars are to be used, the public has a right to know how those dollars are being spent," he said.

In regards to the state biennium budget, Lundy has acknowledged that he is not in favor of proposals that aim to expand charter schools, saying that they are not worthy of support, and has criticized Republicans for supporting them. Lundy has also been considering legal action after being rebuffed in a public-records request, filed April 6, for 17 items of information related to education funding from Governor Kasich.

Lundy involved in controversy over apparent reversal of his promise to support Second Amendment rights in order to obtain endorsements from Ohio gun rights organizations.Lundy stressed the group changed the bill leading to his not supporting the measure. Several of his colleagues in the legislature defended Lundy citing that the group did change the intent of the bill described to them as well.

In regards to public records, Lundy has criticized Governor Kasich for evading the disclosure of certain documents requested by Lundy and others. Kasich defended this with the ruling from the 2008 Ohio Supreme Court case, Glasgow v. Jones. Kasich maintains that the magnitude of the request for documentation illustrated undue cause and lack of a clear objective. Lundy believes that the case is not relevant due to the specificity of the request and has requested the opinion of State Attorney General Mike DeWine. Lundy has stated that the administration has been secretive from the beginning, yet the public wants as much transparency as possible.
