= Bill Thompson (Ohio politician) =

American politician

Bill Thompson is an American politician who is a former member of the Ohio House of Representatives, serving from 1987 to 1997.
