= Jeffrey Manning =

American politician

Member of the Ohio House of Representatives from the 57th district
- In office January 3, 2001 – March 4, 2003
- Preceded by: John Bender
- Succeeded by: Earl Martin

Personal details
- Born: 1949 or 1950 Elyria, Ohio, US
- Died: February 13, 2004 (aged 54)
- Party: Republican

Jeffrey Manning (died February 13, 2004) was a county prosecutor and a member of the Ohio House of Representatives.

Manning was born in Elyria, Ohio. He earned a bachelor's degree from Kent State University and a PhD from the University of Akron.

He was appointed to be Lorain County, Ohio prosecutor to succeed Gregory White, who left to become United States Attorney for Northern Ohio. Manning died of complications of a heart condition in 2004. His wife, Gayle Manning, is currently (2010) a candidate for the Ohio Senate in district 13.
