= Shirley Smith (politician) =

American politician (born 1950)

Shirley A. Smith
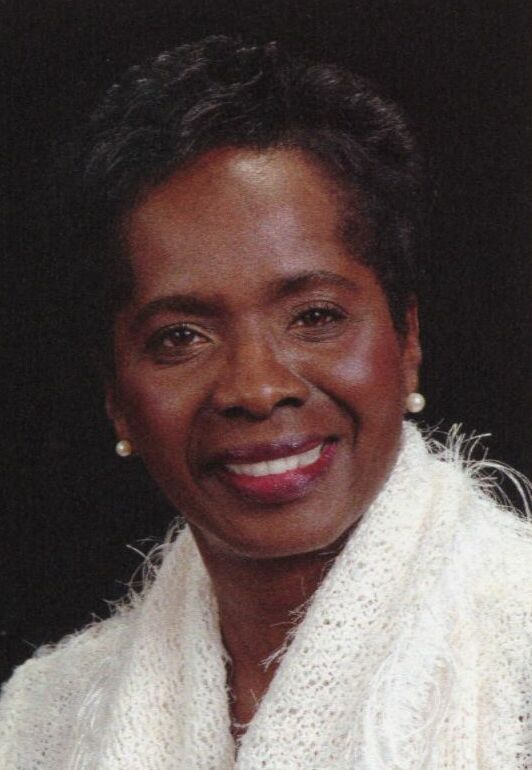

Member of the Ohio Senate from the 21st district
- In office January 2, 2007 – November 30, 2014
- Preceded by: C. J. Prentiss
- Succeeded by: Sandra Williams

Member of the Ohio House of Representatives from the 10th district
- In office January 6, 2003 – January 2, 2007
- Preceded by: Annie L. Key
- Succeeded by: Eugene Miller

Member of the Ohio House of Representatives from the 8th district
- In office January 3, 1999 – January 6, 2003
- Preceded by: C. J. Prentiss
- Succeeded by: Lance Mason

Personal details
- Born: November 29, 1950 (age 75) Cleveland, Ohio, U.S.
- Party: Democratic
- Children: 2
- Education: Cuyahoga Community College (AA); Cleveland State University (BA)

Shirley A. Smith (born November 29, 1950) is an American politician who served as a member of the Ohio Senate from 2007 to 2014. Previously, she was a member of the Ohio House of Representatives. She is a Democrat.

== Early life and education ==
Smith is a native of Cleveland. She earned an associate degree from Cuyahoga Community College and a Bachelor of Arts degree from Cleveland State University.

== Career ==
Smith has worked in sales and marketing, and as a radio talk-show host for a major radio station in Cleveland, and has also served as an independent consultant for Coca-Cola Bottling Company.

When incumbent C. J. Prentiss decided to run for the Ohio Senate, Smith and four other Democrats sought to replace her in the 1998 primary election. Smith won the District 8 nomination with 35.29% of the vote. She won the general election against Republican Dominic Rini with 86.15% of the vote. Smith won reelection in District 8 in 2000 against Republican Ronnie Jones with 87.2% of the vote.

In 2002, Smith again faced a primary challenge from four other Democrats, due to redistricting. However she won the District 10 nomination with 43.66% of the vote. She went unopposed in the general election and was unopposed for the 2004 general election. For the 126th General Assembly, Smith served as secretary of the Ohio Legislative Black Caucus (OLBC).

=== Ohio Senate ===
In late 2005, Smith announced that she would run to succeed term-limited Prentiss in the Senate, along with Representatives Annie L. Key, Claudette Woodard and two other Democrats. While it was a contested primary, Smith defeated the opposition to take the District 21 nomination with 50.86% of the votes. She won the general election with 85.34% of the electorate. In the 127th General Assembly, Smith served as president of the OLBC.

Early in 2008, the Senate Democrats ousted Minority Leader Teresa Fedor and replaced her with Ray Miller, as well as Smith as assistant minority leader. With the beginning of the 128th General Assembly, the caucus retained Smith in her role as assistant minority leader under Capri Cafaro.

In 2010, Smith won election to a second term in the Senate, defeating Republican Burrell Jackson with 84.4% of the vote.

Smith resigned a month prior to the end of her term.

=== 2021 U.S. House campaign ===
On January 19, 2021, Smith declared her candidacy in the Democratic primary for the 2021 special election in Ohio's 11th congressional district. She placed fifth with 583 votes, 0.8% of the 75,064 total votes cast, in the August 3 primary.

== Electoral history ==
Ohio Senate 21st District: Results 2006 to 2010
Year	Democrat	Votes	Pct	Republican	Votes	Pct
2010	Shirley Smith	52,296	84.07%	Burrell Jackson	9,908	15.93%
2006	Shirley Smith	54,492	85.22%	Richard Norris	9,448	14.78%

Ohio House of Representatives 10th District: Results 1998 to 2004
Year	Democrat	Votes	Pct	Republican	Votes	Pct
2004	Shirley Smith	26.174	100.00%	Unopposed		
2002	Shirley Smith	14,908	100.00%	Unopposed		
2000	Shirley Smith	26,947	87.20%	Ronnie Jones	3,959	12.80%
1998	Shirley Smith	18,969	86.15%	Dominic Rini	3,049	13.85%

== Personal life ==
Smith is divorced with two children. She lives in Cleveland, but also owns property in South Euclid, Ohio.

Ohio House of Representatives
Preceded by C. J. Prentiss	Member of the Ohio House from the 8th district 1999–2003	Succeeded by Lance Mason
Preceded by Annie L. Key	Member of the Ohio House from the 10th district 2003–2006	Succeeded by Eugene Miller
Ohio Senate
Preceded by C. J. Prentiss	Member of the Ohio Senate from the 21st district 2007–2014	Succeeded by Sandra Williams
