= C. J. Prentiss =

American politician (1941–2024)

C.J. Prentiss
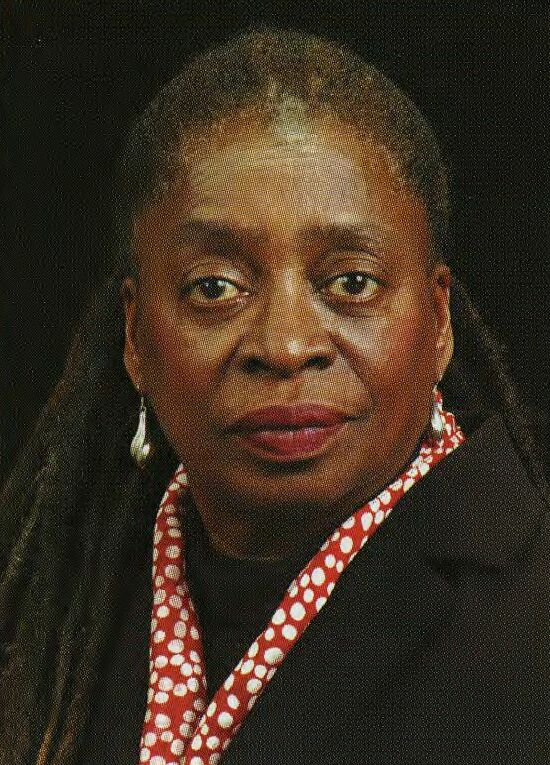

Ohio Senate Minority Leader
- In office January 3, 2005 – December 31, 2006
- Preceded by: Greg DiDonato
- Succeeded by: Teresa Fedor

Member of the Ohio Senate from the 21st district
- In office January 5, 1999 – December 31, 2006
- Preceded by: Jeff Johnson
- Succeeded by: Shirley Smith

Member of the Ohio House of Representatives from the 8th district
- In office January 3, 1991 – December 31, 1998
- Preceded by: Ike Thompson
- Succeeded by: Shirley Smith

Personal details
- Born: June 6, 1941 Cleveland, Ohio, U.S.
- Died: April 2, 2024 (aged 82) Cleveland, Ohio, U.S.
- Party: Democratic
- Spouse: Michael Charney

Carolyn Jean Prentiss (June 6, 1941 – April 2, 2024) was an American politician of the Democratic party who served in the Ohio State Senate from 1999 until 2007. During the 126th Ohio General Assembly, she served as minority leader.

== Life and career ==
Born in Cleveland in 1941, Prentiss grew up in an activist family. Her father worked with the Future Outlook League, which was critical in mobilizing the Black community and increasing Black employment. He was assaulted trying to integrate an amusement park during the Euclid Beach Park Riot of 1946. C. J. attended the March on Washington in 1963 along with her mother.

Prentiss earned a bachelor of arts degree and a master's degree in education from Cleveland State University. She held a post-graduate certificate in Administration from Kent State University. She attended the advanced management program at Case Western Reserve University's Weatherhead School of Management.

In 1976, Prentiss was one of the only Black women integrally involved in Ohio’s Cuyahoga Women’s Political Caucus, which at the time was primarily composed of white women. She became a delegate to the Democratic Convention for Jesse Jackson in 1984, and then became co-chair of the Cleveland Rainbow Coalition.

From 1985 to 1990, she served on the Ohio State Board of Education. Known in Columbus as "the highest ranking African-American education lawmaker in the state of Ohio," Prentiss served eight years in the Ohio State House of Representatives (8th district) before serving eight years in the Ohio State Senate (21st district). While in the Ohio State Senate, she represented constituents of Bratenahl, Brooklyn Heights, Cleveland Heights, Cuyahoga Heights, East Cleveland, Newburgh Heights and University Heights. She served as minority whip (during the 125th General Assembly), was Senate minority leader, was the first female president of the Ohio Legislative Black Caucus (OLBC), and was the second African-American woman to serve as the Democratic leader in the Ohio Senate (after Rhine McLin).

Prentiss was on numerous committees, and consistently advocated for those most underserved. She spearheaded significant legislation that helped to decrease the Black-white academic achievement gap, she obtained funding for all-day kindergarten and reduced class sizes, and she worked tirelessly to improve education for students of all races. Under her leadership, the NBCSL published Closing the Achievement Gap: Improving Educational Outcomes for African American Children, which helped to put the achievement gap on the national agenda.

Prentiss was also on the founding board of directors for the nonpartisan economic policy group Policy Matters Ohio.

In 2007, she was chosen to be the Special Education adviser to Ohio Governor Ted Strickland.

Prentiss appeared on the pilot episode of 30 Days, discussing living on minimum wage.

She was a candidate in the special election to replace Stephanie Tubbs-Jones in the 110th Congress, but withdrew before the primary.

Prentiss died in Cleveland on April 2, 2024, at the age of 82.
