= Mike Mitchell (Ohio politician) =

American politician

Member of the Ohio House of Representatives from the 26th district
- In office January 3, 2005 – December 31, 2006
- Preceded by: Larry Price
- Succeeded by: Tracy Heard

Personal details
- Party: Democratic

Mike Mitchell is a former Ohio Representative who represented the 26th District, based out of Columbus, Ohio.

== See also ==
- List of United States Senate elections in Ohio
