= Ray Miller (Ohio legislator) =

American politician (1948/1949–2026)

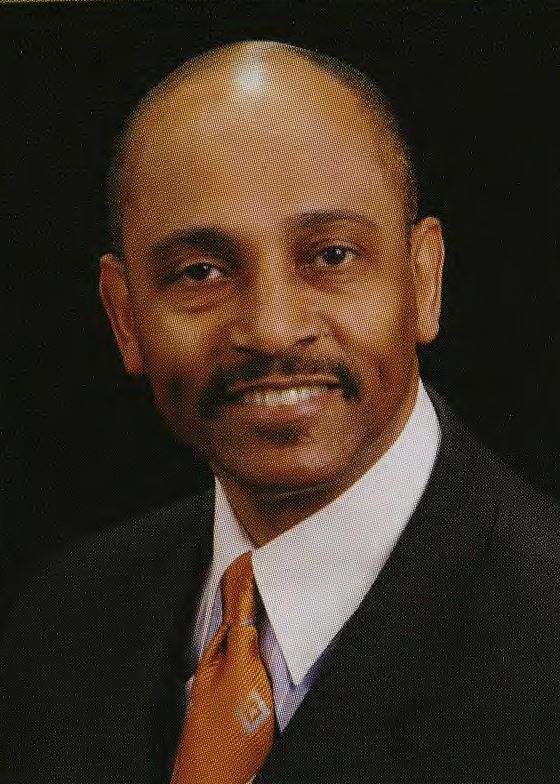
- Miller in 2006

Ohio Senate Minority Leader
- In office January 15, 2008 – January 5, 2009
- Preceded by: Teresa Fedor
- Succeeded by: Capri Cafaro

Member of the Ohio Senate from the 15th district
- In office January 6, 2003 – December 31, 2010
- Preceded by: Ben Espy
- Succeeded by: Charleta Tavares

Member of the Ohio House of Representatives from the 22nd district
- In office January 5, 1999 – December 31, 2002
- Preceded by: Charleta Tavares
- Succeeded by: Larry Price
- In office January 3, 1983 – July 1, 1993
- Preceded by: Leslie Brown
- Succeeded by: Charleta Tavares

Personal details
- Born: 1948 or 1949
- Died: August 28, 2026 (aged 77)
- Party: Democratic

Ray Miller (1948 or 1949 — August 28, 2026) was an American Democratic politician who was a member of the Ohio General Assembly.

== Life and career ==
A graduate of the Ohio State University and a former staffer in the Carter Administration, Miller was elected to the Ohio House of Representatives in 1982, succeeding Leslie Brown. He won reelection in 1984, and 1986. In 1988, he won a fourth term, and was named as President of the Legislative Black Caucus. He again won reelection in 1990, and 1992.

In 1993, Miller resigned from the House to create a policy nonprofit organization, and was succeeded by Charleta Tavares. However, his retirement was short lived. He again ran for the seat in 1998, and won to succeed Tavares, who had left to take a seat on Columbus City Council. He was reelected in 2000.

=== Ohio Senate ===
With Ben Espy being term limited in 2002, Miller sought to succeed him, and won the 15th District. He took the seat on January 3, 2003, and was reelected in 2006. In 2008, Miller led a successful political coup in which he replaced minority leader Teresa Fedor. However, following the 2008 elections, Miller stepped down from the post to begin his transition to the private sector. On January 10, 2011 Miller founded The Columbus African American news journal where he remained the journal's Publisher and Chairman.

Miller was term limited and unable to run again in 2010, and again was succeeded by Tavares. He recently completed a six-year appointment on the Central State University Board of Trustees.

=== Death ===
Miller died on August 28, 2026, at the age of 77.
