= Steve Driehaus =

American politician (born 1966)

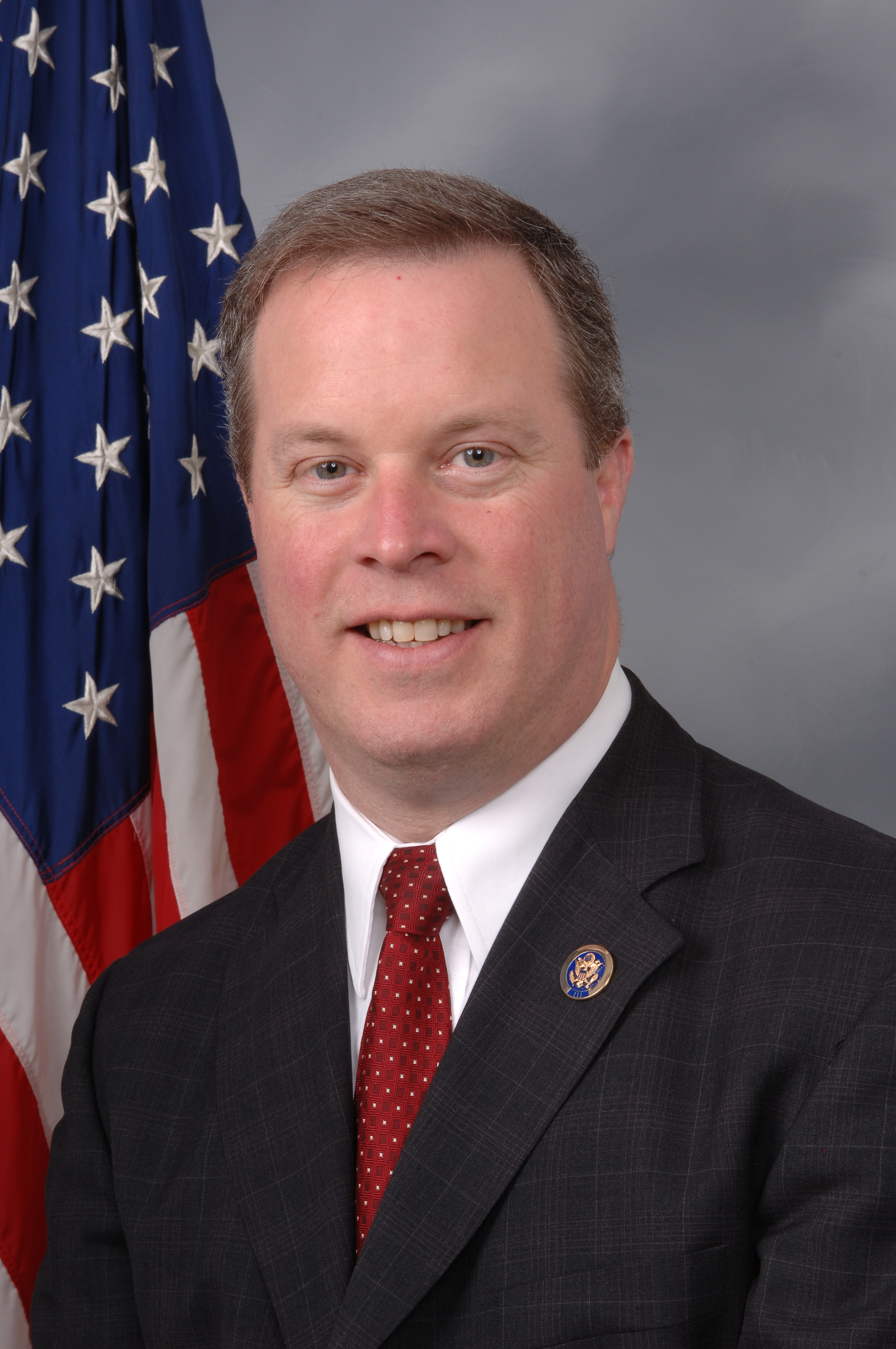
- Official portrait, 2009

Member of the U.S. House of Representatives from Ohio's 1st district
- In office January 3, 2009 – January 3, 2011
- Preceded by: Steve Chabot
- Succeeded by: Steve Chabot

Member of the Ohio House of Representatives from the 31st district
- In office January 2003 – January 2009
- Preceded by: Catherine Barrett
- Succeeded by: Denise Driehaus

Member of the Ohio House of Representatives from the 33rd district
- In office January 2001 – January 2003
- Preceded by: Jerry Luebbers
- Succeeded by: Tyrone Yates

Personal details
- Born: Steven Leo Driehaus; June 24, 1966 (age 60) Cincinnati, Ohio, U.S.
- Party: Democratic
- Relatives: Denise Driehaus (sister)
- Education: Miami University (BA); Indiana University, Bloomington (MPA)

Steven Leo Driehaus (born June 24, 1966) is an American politician and former U.S. representative for Ohio's 1st congressional district, serving from 2009 until 2011. A member of the Democratic Party, he previously served as the Minority Whip in the Ohio House of Representatives.

The district included the western four-fifths of Cincinnati, as well as suburbs north and west of the city in Hamilton and Butler counties. He was formerly a four-term member of the Ohio House of Representatives, representing the 31st District from 2001 to 2009. His Ohio State House district included western Cincinnati and all of Addyston, Cheviot, Cleves and North Bend, Ohio.

== Early life and education ==
Driehaus (January 21, 2008)

Driehaus, a 1984 graduate and class president of Elder High School in Cincinnati, studied political science at Miami University while earning a Bachelor of Arts degree in 1988. He earned a Master of Public Administration (MPA) from Indiana University Bloomington in 1995.

== Career ==
He served as a Peace Corps volunteer in Senegal where he worked with village groups and local schools as a natural resource volunteer to promote sustainable environmental practices from 1988 to 1990.

Driehaus then served as Associate Director of the Center for International Education and Development Assistance at Indiana University. While serving in this role, he coordinated the South African Internship Program, which was sponsored by the United States Information Agency that is the largest professional exchange program between the United States and South Africa. He formerly directed and served as consultant to the Community Building Institute, a collaborative effort of Xavier University and United Way & Community Chest that promotes citizen-led, asset-based community development. He is a member of the Price Hill Civic Club and serves on the Board of Seton High School. He was a part-time political science instructor at Xavier University. He began his political career as an aide for Cincinnati City Council Member Todd Portune and former U.S. Rep. Charlie Luken in the 1990s.

=== Ohio House of Representatives ===
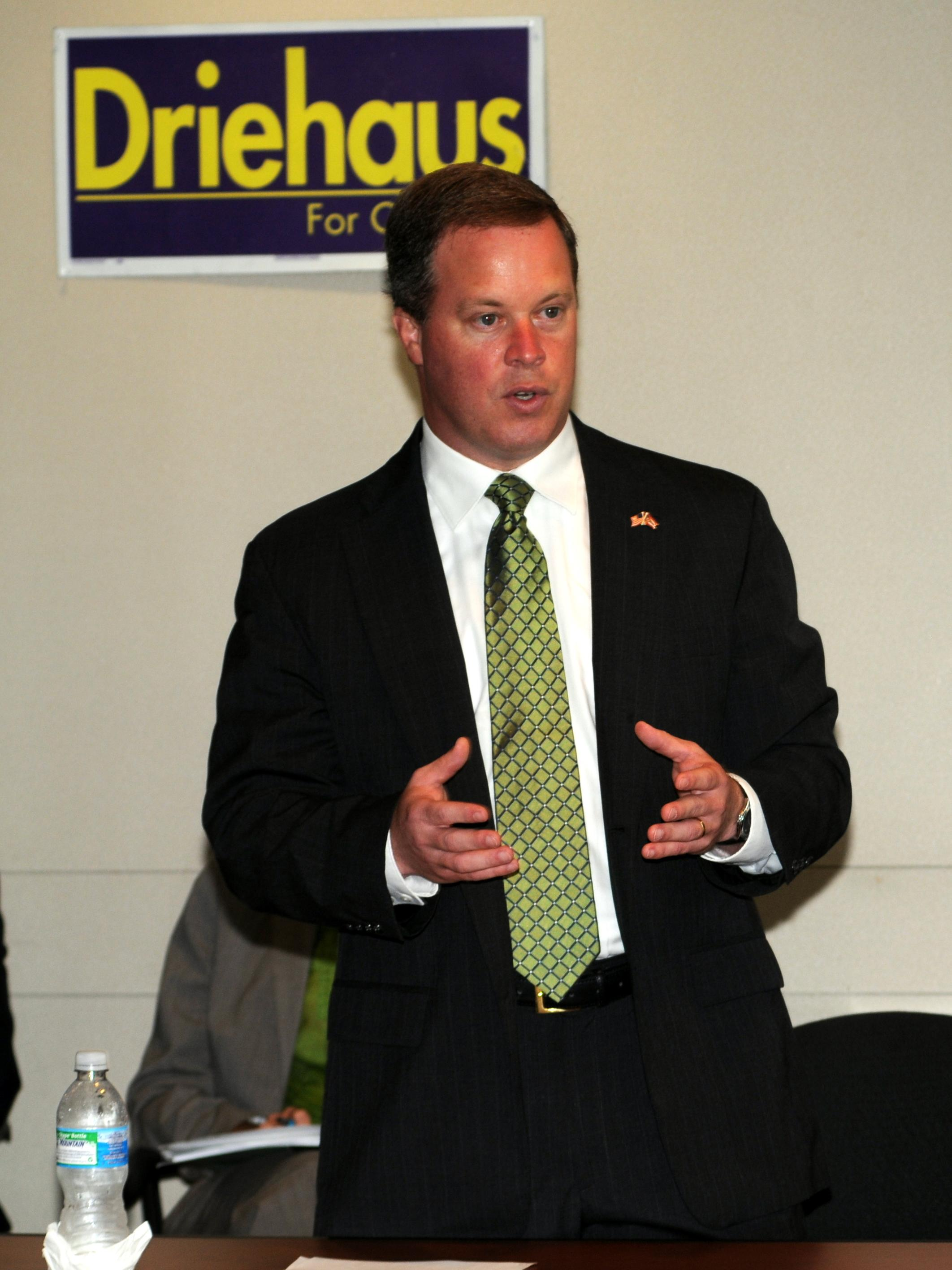
Driehaus (July 21, 2008)

Driehaus served four consecutive terms. He served as Minority Whip of the Ohio House of Representatives from the beginning of his third term in January 2005 until he resigned from the position to be replaced by Fred Strahorn in December 2007 due to his campaign.

Driehaus took a leadership role on issues such as election law and redistricting reform. He took issue with information privacy in the state.

== U.S. House of Representatives ==
=== Committee assignments ===
- Committee on Financial Services
  - Subcommittee on Housing and Community Opportunity
  - Subcommittee on International Monetary Policy and Trade
  - Subcommittee on Oversight and Investigations
- Committee on Oversight and Government Reform
  - Subcommittee on Information Policy, Census, and National Archives
  - Subcommittee on National Security and Foreign Affairs

Driehaus was a centrist politician. The Cincinnati Enquirer named him legislative "Rookie of the Year" during his first term. In 2008, the ARC of Ohio and the Ohio Association of Election Officials named him Democratic Legislator of the Year. He had a reputation as an anti-abortion fiscal conservative.

== Political campaigns ==
=== Ohio House campaigns ===
In 2000, Driehaus ran for the Ohio House of Representatives from the 33rd district, which at the time included Delhi Township, Price Hill, Sayler Park and other parts of western Hamilton County.

The incumbent, Jerome Luebbers, had surrendered his seat due to term limits. In the 2002 redistricting, Driehaus' district became the 31st district and surrendered many Republican constituents. Driehaus has served the 31st Ohio House of Representatives district, which has included wards 19–22, 25 & 26 of Cincinnati as well as Cheviot, Cleves, North Bend, and Addyston since the 2002 redistricting. This district is fully contained within Ohio's 1st congressional district. It is also (along with districts 32 and 33) part of Ohio Senate district 9, which encompasses the south central portion of Hamilton County.

Driehaus did not have an opponent in any of his Democratic primaries, and he earned at least 57% shares of the vote in each of his general elections for state legislature.

=== 2006 elections ===
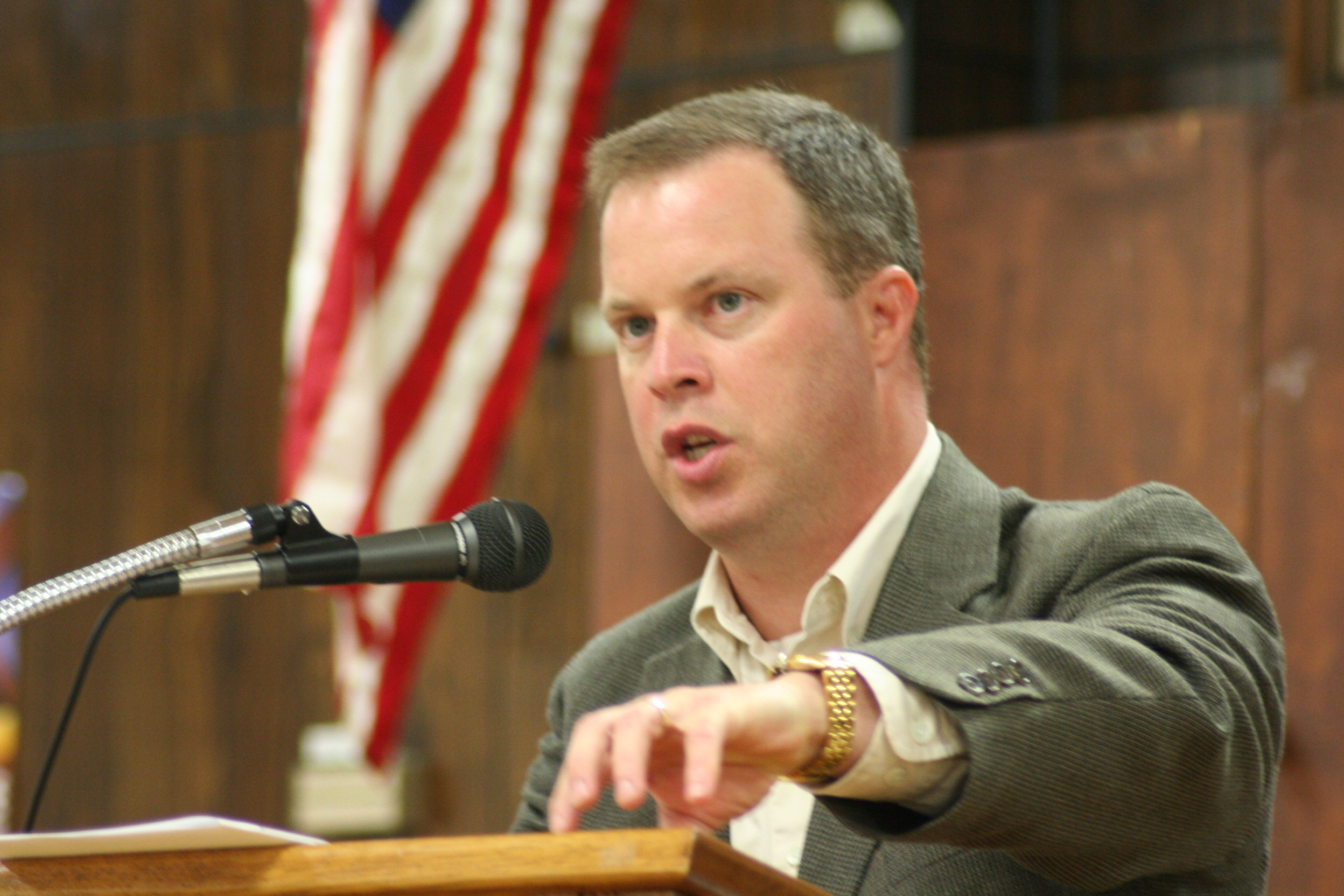
Driehaus during third term in the Ohio House (October 11, 2005)

Driehaus had been the choice of the Democratic Congressional Campaign Committee (DCCC) to run in Ohio's 1st congressional district for the 2006 United States House of Representatives elections, but he decided to run for re-election in his Ohio House of Representatives seat. He had been elected as the Minority Whip of the Ohio House of Representatives, replacing Dale Miller for the beginning of the 2005 session, in a November 2004 vote after being reelected to his third term. Driehaus survived his own challenge from Scott Gehring with a 2:1 victory margin in the 2006 election for his state house seat.

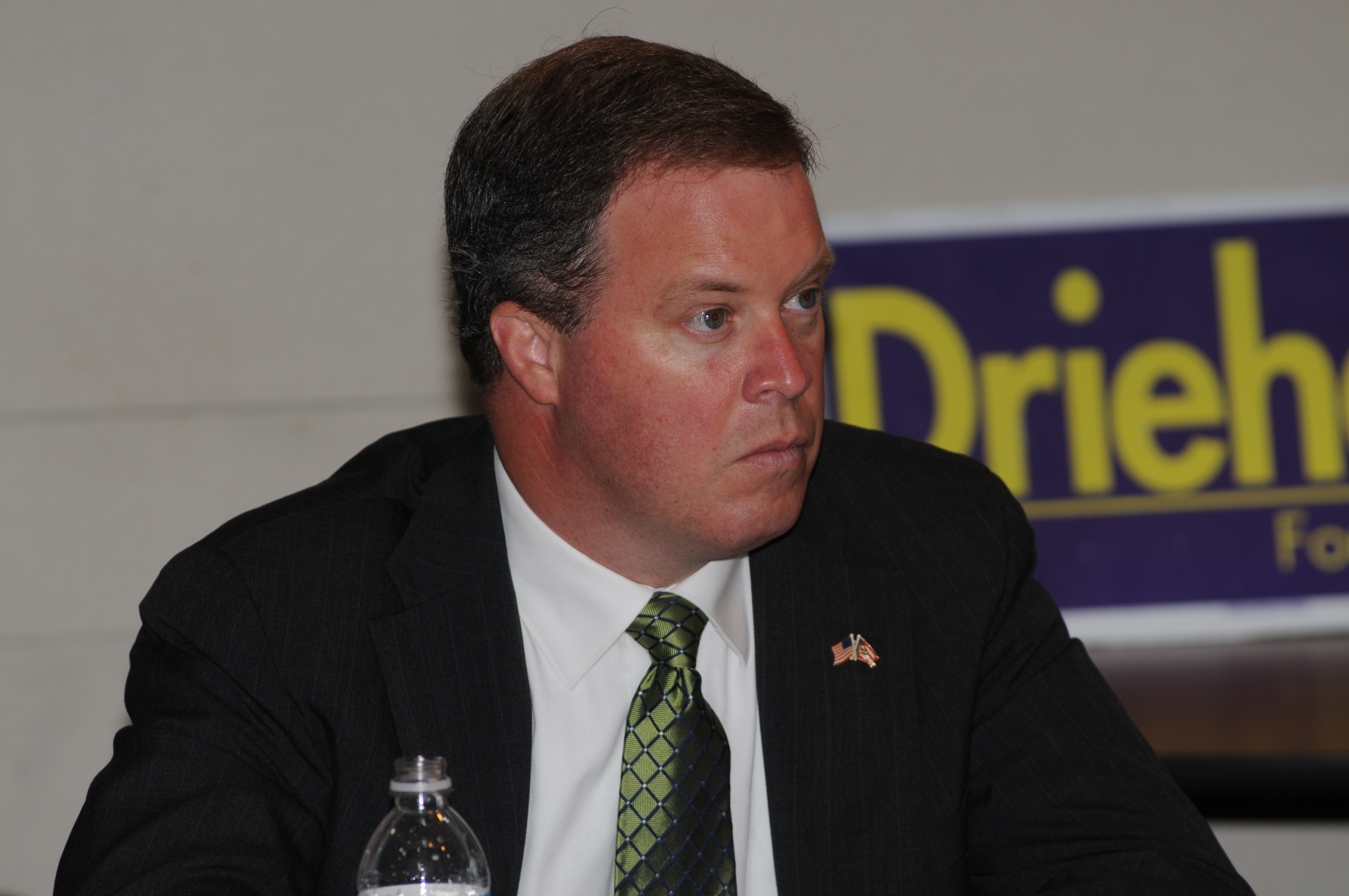
Driehaus campaigning in 2008

Based on the 2000 and 2004 United States presidential elections, the district has voted 1% more Republican than the nation as a whole. The district is regarded as a Democratically shifting maturing suburban district that is expected to vote more city-like as it becomes more dense. The district was one of four Republican Ohio congressional seats that the party had targeted for takeover, but Chabot held off Cincinnati Councilman John Cranley by a 52% to 48% margin and the Republicans held on to three of the four seats.

=== 2008 congressional campaign ===
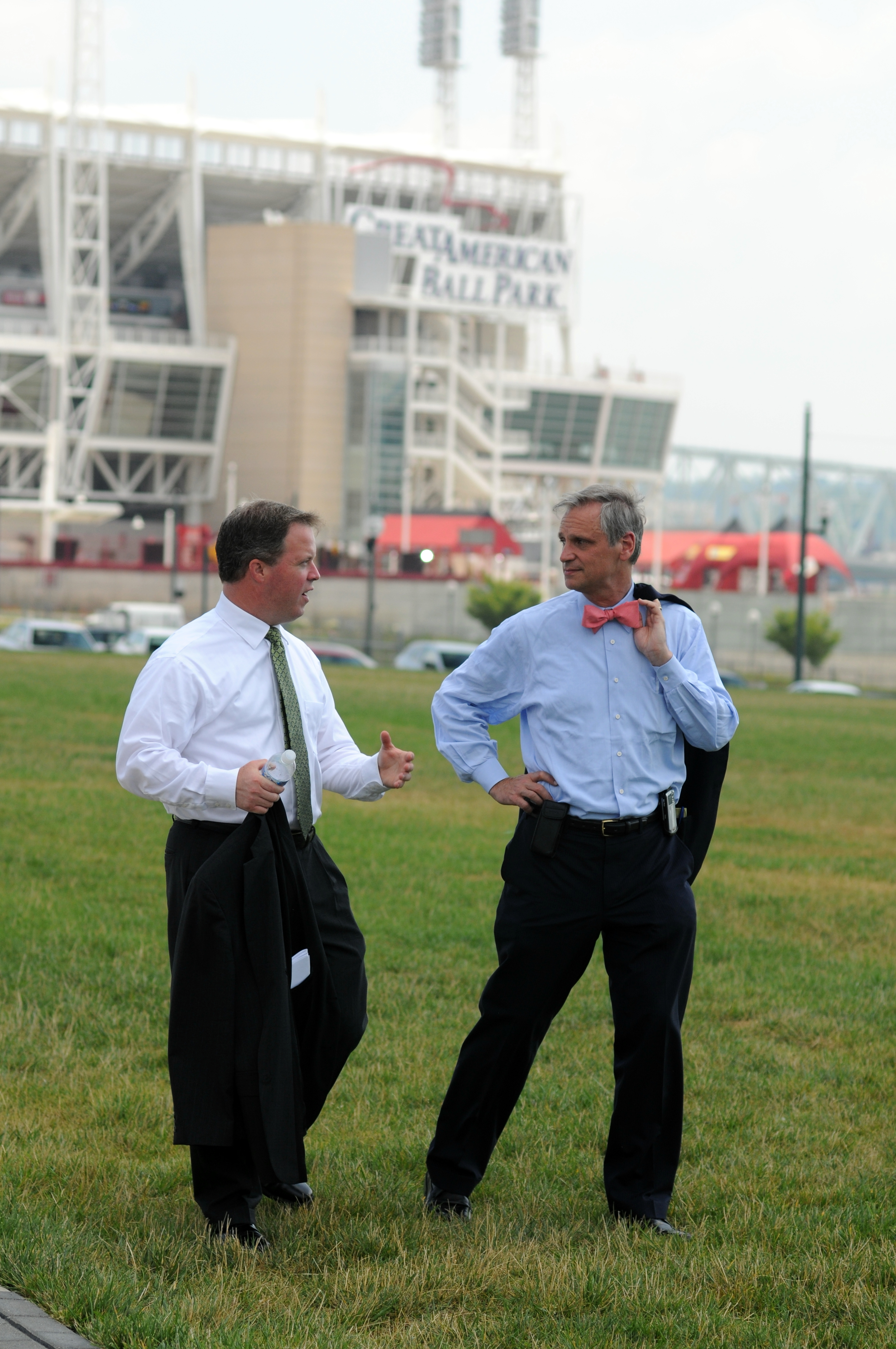
Driehaus outside Great American Ball Park on day of League of Conservation Voters endorsement (July 21, 2008)

Although Driehaus passed on the 2006 race, he began planning a run for the district in 2008 almost as soon as the 2006 election cycle ended. This was largely because he was barred from running for a fifth term in the state house. Ohio's 1st district was very high on the target list for the Democrats in both 2006 and 2008. Seven-term Republican incumbent Steve Chabot, elected in the Republican wave of 1994, had won the district consistently, but with varying margins. He had won the seat with less than 55% of the vote in four of his seven previous victories.

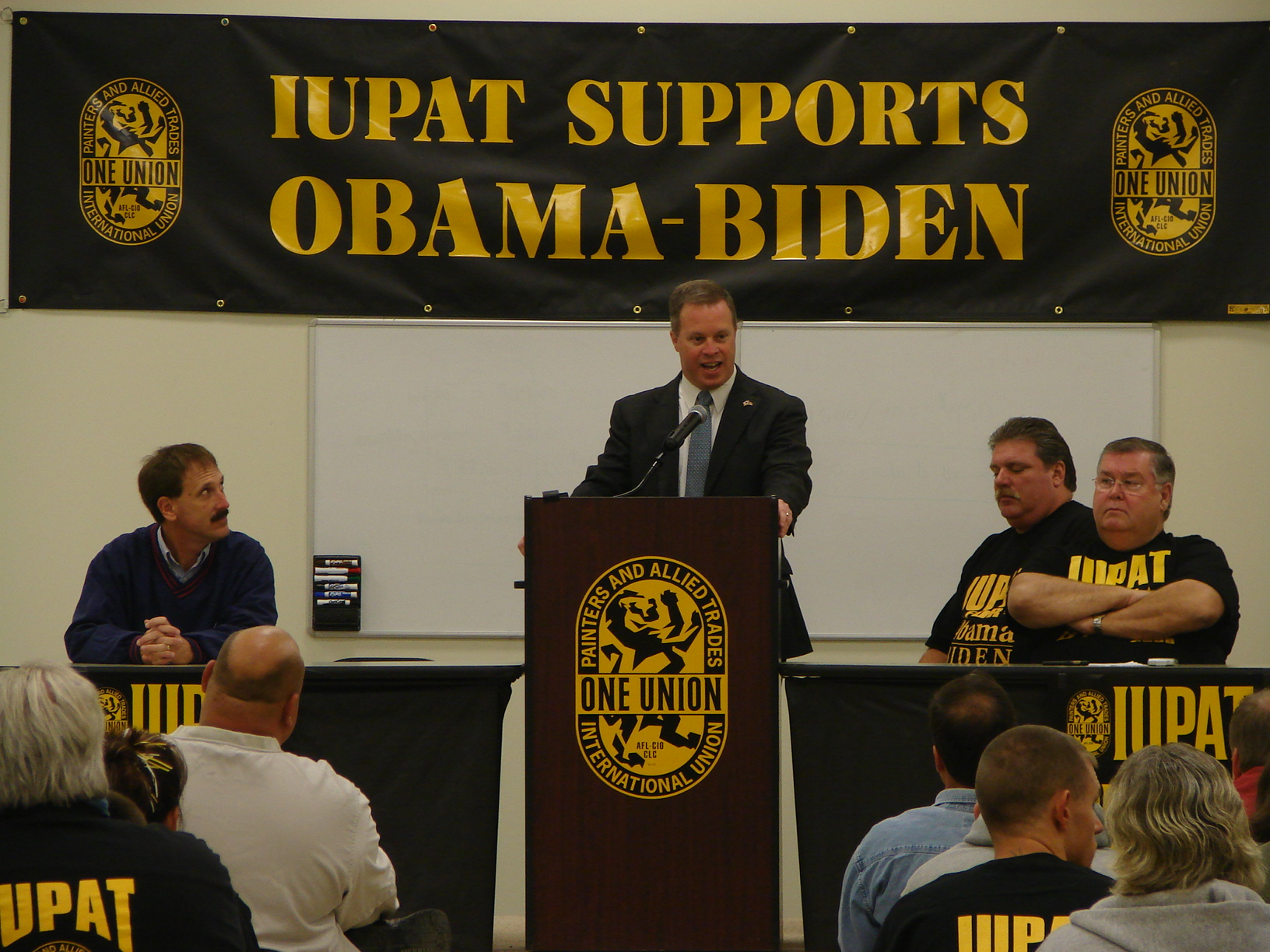
Driehaus at IUPAT Obama-Biden rally in Cincinnati, Ohio (October 24, 2008)

In previous elections, the 1st congressional district was hotly contested. It narrowly favored Democratic Ohio Governor Ted Strickland and United States Senator Sherrod Brown in 2006; and United States President George W. Bush narrowly outpaced Democratic nominee John Kerry by just 1 percentage point in the 2004 United States presidential election. Driehaus was recruited for the race by Democratic party officials, and he received early contributions for this race from Nancy Pelosi, Steny H. Hoyer, James E. Clyburn, and Chris Van Hollen, that were included in his 2007 second quarter financial filings. From the time of the first official announcement on May 3, 2007, and first financial filing deadline on July 15, 2007, the race has been closely watched in the national media, and Time described it as one of the 15 Congressional races to watch in the 2008 election. The DCCC has named the district's race as one of the thirteen that it is supporting in hopes of ousting a Republican incumbent in the 2008 United States House of Representatives elections.

During the 2008 financial crisis, especially the subprime mortgage crisis, one of the issues in the race was the candidates stances on foreclosures. The race was considered to be close. As of October 14, 2008 (three weeks before election day), The Rothenberg Political Report considered the race to be a toss-up. A poll by Survey USA indicated that African-American turnout would probably determine who won the race.

Although a marginally Republican district, 27 percent of the district's voters are African-American — one of the highest percentages for a Republican-held district in the 109th Congress. The district includes nearly all of Cincinnati's African-American voters. In the November 4 election, Driehaus defeated incumbent Chabot with 52 percent of the vote, largely on the strength of a 16,000-vote margin in Hamilton County. Barack Obama carried the district with 55 percent of the vote.

=== 2010 congressional campaign ===
Driehaus was challenged by Republican nominee and his predecessor, former U.S. Congressman Steve Chabot, as well as Libertarian nominee James Berns, and Green Party nominee Richard Stevenson. As Chabot was ahead in public opinion polls, the DCCC pulled its financial support for TV ads from the Driehaus campaign, indicating to NBC pundit Chuck Todd that they expected Driehaus to be defeated, which he was, 52% to 45%. Until the inauguration of Greg Landsman, Driehaus was the last Democrat to have represented Cincinnati in Congress.

In October 2012 Driehaus filed a criminal complaint against the Susan B. Anthony List claiming the organization violated Ohio law against making false statements in a campaign advertisement. He later asked that the complaint be dropped. Driehaus later sued the List, claiming the group caused his "loss of livelihood" by "defaming" him by saying he supported taxpayer funded abortion due to his vote for the Affordable Care Act. The case was decided in favor of the Susan B. Anthony List (Defendants) (805 F.Supp.2d 412 (2011)).

== Electoral history ==
Date	Office	District	Democratic	Votes	Percentage	Republican	Votes	Percentage
November 7, 2000	Ohio House of Representatives	33	Steve Driehaus	19,263	57.26%	Tony Condia	14,377	42.74%
November 5, 2002	Ohio House of Representatives	31	Steve Driehaus	13,916	65.21%	Sheryl Ross	7,425	34.79%
November 2, 2004	Ohio House of Representatives	31	Steve Driehaus	26,330	69.36%	Terry Weber	11,634	30.64%
November 7, 2006	Ohio House of Representatives	31	Steve Driehaus	15,557	67.33%	Scott Gehring	7,550	32.67%
November 4, 2008	U.S. House of Representatives	Ohio's 1st	Steve Driehaus	155,089	52.45%	Steve Chabot	140,469	47.5%
November 2, 2010	U.S. House of Representatives	Ohio's 1st	Steve Driehaus	92,672	45.99%	Steve Chabot	103,770	51.49%

== Peace Corps ==
In March 2011, Driehaus was selected for an approximately two and a half years tenure as the Peace Corps' director of HIV and AIDS education in Eswatini. This follows on his prior African Peace Corps experience as a volunteer. His wife and three children moved along with him. On June 29, 2011, he completed his staff training and was sworn in for service.

== Personal life ==
Driehaus was raised in Green Township by H. Donald and Clare Driehaus, along with his seven siblings. They are congregants at St. Teresa of Avila Catholic parish. His father, Don Driehaus, is a former Hamilton County Democratic Party co-chairman.

He was succeeded in the Ohio House of Representatives by his sister Denise. Their father died on September 21, 2008, aged 75.

In 2018, Driehaus launched GoodGovernmentGroup, a consulting firm based in Cincinnati.

U.S. House of Representatives
Preceded by Steve Chabot	Member of the U.S. House of Representatives from Ohio's 1st congressional district 2009–2011	Succeeded by Steve Chabot
U.S. order of precedence (ceremonial)
Preceded by John Boccieri as Former U.S. Representative	Order of precedence of the United States as Former US Representative	Succeeded by Mary Jo Kilroy as Former U.S. Representative
