= Larry Price (politician) =

American politician

Member of the Ohio House of Representatives from the 26th district
- In office January 3, 2003 – December 31, 2004
- Preceded by: Ray Miller
- Succeeded by: Mike Mitchell

Personal details
- Party: Democratic

Larry Price is a former member of the Ohio House of Representatives, representing the Columbus, Ohio area
