= Annie L. Key =

American politician

Annie Key

Member of the Ohio House of Representatives from the 11th district
- In office January 6, 2003 – December 31, 2006
- Preceded by: Lance Mason
- Succeeded by: Sandra Williams

Member of the Ohio House of Representatives from the 10th district
- In office January 3, 2001 – January 6, 2003
- Preceded by: Troy Lee James
- Succeeded by: Shirley Smith

Personal details
- Born: 1940 (age 85–86) Camden, Alabama
- Party: Democratic

Annie Key is a former Democratic member of the Ohio House of Representatives, representing the 11th District from 2001 to 2006. A former telephone worker with Ohio Bell and later AT&T, Key initially ran for the Ohio House of Representatives in 2000 to succeed Troy Lee James, who had held the seat for 34 years and no longer could run due to term limits. She succeeded in her bid, and was seated on January 3, 2001. She would go on to win reelection in 2002, and 2004. By her second term, Key was serving as the ranking Democratic member on the Ethics and Elections Committee.

In 2006, Key opted to forgo another term in the House to run for the Ohio Senate in an open seat. However, with the seat being incredibly Democratic, she faced a contentious primary against Shirley Smith and Claudette Woodard. In the end, Smith defeated Key, ultimately ending her political career in Columbus. She was succeeded by her aide, Democrat Sandra Williams.

Following her defeat, Key returned to Cleveland and remains active in the community.

Her daughter, Stephanie Howse, currently serves in the Ohio House representing the 11th District - Key's former district.
