= John R. Willamowski =

American politician

John Willamowski

Judge of the Ohio District Court of Appeals from the 3rd district
- Incumbent
- Assumed office February 9, 2011

Member of the Ohio House of Representatives
- In office January 3, 2003 – December 31, 2006
- Preceded by: Bob Latta
- Succeeded by: Matt Huffman
- Constituency: 4th district
- In office August 8, 1997 – December 31, 2002
- Preceded by: Bill Thompson
- Succeeded by: Chuck Blasdel
- Constituency: 1st district

Personal details
- Born: July 22, 1960 (age 66) South Bend, Indiana, U.S.
- Party: Republican
- Spouse: Mona
- Children: 4
- Education: University of Notre Dame (BA); Ohio Northern University (JD)

John Willamowski (born July 22, 1960) is a former Republican member of the Ohio House of Representatives. In 2006, Willamowski was elected to the Ohio District Courts of Appeals for the third district where has served since. He resides in Lima, Ohio.

Ohio House of Representatives
Preceded by Bill Thompson	Member of the Ohio House of Representatives from the 1st district 1997–2002	Succeeded by Chuck Blasdel
Preceded by Bob Latta	Member of the Ohio House of Representatives from the 4th district 2003–2006	Succeeded by Matt Huffman
