= William J. Hartnett =

American politician

Bill Hartnett

Member of the Ohio House of Representatives from the 73rd district
- In office September 16, 1998 – December 31, 2006
- Preceded by: Frank Sawyer
- Succeeded by: Jay Goyal

Personal details
- Party: Democratic

William J. Hartnett (April 3, 1932 – June 17, 2016) was an American politician.

Hackett was born in New Castle, Pennsylvania and moved with his family to Orrville, Ohio. Hartnell served in the United States Navy during the Korean War. He graduated from Kent State University and West Virginia University. He was a high school coach and teacher in Mansfield, Ohio. He was a former member of the Ohio House of Representatives, serving from 1998 to 2006. He died at OhioHealth Mansfield Hospital in Mansfield, Ohio.
