= Chris Redfern =

American politician

Member of the Ohio House of Representatives
- In office January 2, 2013 – January 5, 2015
- Preceded by: Terry Johnson
- Succeeded by: Steve Kraus
- Constituency: 89th district
- In office September 8, 1999 – January 5, 2009
- Preceded by: Darrell Opfer
- Succeeded by: Dennis Murray
- Constituency: 53rd district (1999–2003); 80th district (2003–2009)

Chair of the Ohio Democratic Party
- In office December 19, 2005 – December 31, 2014
- Preceded by: Rhine McLin (acting)
- Succeeded by: David Pepper

Minority Leader of the Ohio House of Representatives
- In office January 6, 2003 – January 15, 2006
- Preceded by: Dean DePiero
- Succeeded by: Joyce Beatty

Personal details
- Born: October 1, 1964 (age 61) South Bend, Indiana, U.S.
- Party: Democratic
- Education: Bowling Green State University (BA, MA)

Chris Redfern (born October 1, 1964) is an American politician, former state representative in Ohio, and former chair of the Ohio Democratic Party. He won election to the chairmanship of the Ohio Democratic Party in December 2005 and was reelected in 2008 and again in 2012 before resigning in December 2014. He was previously a Democratic State Representative for Ohio House District 80 and had been a member of the Ohio House since 1999. During the 2012 general election, he was again elected to serve as State Representative for the newly drawn 89th District.

== Political career ==
Redfern is the only Ohio Democratic Party Chairman on record to have served as chairman when the Democratic Party won gubernatorial, U.S. Senate, and presidential elections. In 2008, The Columbus Dispatch wrote:"Democrats made history -- marking the first time a party that did not draw the district lines was ever able to take control of the House chamber." Following President Barack Obama's successful 2012 re-election, Redfern became the only State Party Chairman in Ohio's history to help a Democratic presidential candidate carry Ohio twice with more than 50% of the vote. Since taking office in late 2005, Redfern has helped raise more than $100,000,000 for Ohio Democrats.

Before becoming party chairman, he was the Minority Leader in the Ohio House of Representatives. During Redfern's term as Minority Leader, he was the first Democratic Leader to oversee multiple gains in the Ohio House of Representatives (during the 2004 election) since former Speaker of the Ohio House Vern Riffe. Redfern was also an Ottawa County commissioner from 1993 to 1999 - the youngest in the state when his term began in 1993.

In 2008, Redfern set the party's sights on the general election and began constructing the largest field operation ever envisioned by a state political party. Together, the Campaign for Change and the Ohio Democratic Party registered 105,862 new Ohio voters and engaged in 3,552,486 conversations with Ohioans at their doors or on the phone. Fueling these record-breaking figures were the efforts of more than 60,000 volunteers from neighborhoods across Ohio. On Election Day, Ohio Democrats delivered a decisive victory for Barack Obama and picked up three new congressional seats. Democrats also captured the Ohio House on a legislative map drawn by state Republicans, a feat never before seen in Ohio history.

At a September 20, 2010 Democratic Party event hosted by the United Steelworkers, Redfern was recorded on a WTOV-TV camera using a derogatory term in referring to opponents of the health care law saying, "It's in the very base terms we win these arguments. Every time one of these fuckers says, excuse my language..." Redfern later remarked that he thought the camera was off. "The reporter was working her BlackBerry and the photographer was standing away from his camera, but I guess it was on."

Following a national Republican wave in 2010, Redfern led Ohio Democrats back to victory in 2012 by championing one of the largest campaign investments in Ohio's history. Between the Ohio Democratic Party and the President's Ohio campaign, Democrats made an unprecedented 16,261,643 attempts to talk to Ohio voters from more than 170 field offices, staffed by more than 750 paid employees and tens of thousands of volunteers across the state. On election night, Redfern's gamble paid off as Barack Obama became the first Democratic presidential candidate since 1940 to carry more than fifty percent of Ohio voters' support twice.

Ohio Democrats' early investment was also successful for Senator Sherrod Brown who was able to overcome an unprecedented $40 million spent against him in attack ads in part because of the infrastructure his campaign and the Ohio Democratic Party put in place. Despite a redistricting period controlled by the opposing party where three Democratic State House incumbent seats were eliminated, Ohio Democrats also won races that were supposed to be out of reach, and overcame a 3-1 financial disadvantage and for the first time in 12 years, Democrats won a seat on the Ohio Supreme Court.

In 2014, Republican Governor John Kasich, once seen as one of the most vulnerable Republican governors in that year's elections, was re-elected over Cuyahoga County commissioner Ed FitzGerald. Redfern resigned the following month.

== Personal life ==
Redfern attended Bowling Green State University where he earned both a bachelor's degree and then his master's degree in state and local government. He received the BGSU Accomplished Graduate Award in 2004. Redfern lives on Catawba Island with his daughter, Reese. In 2014 he opened Rocky Point Winery in Marblehead, a boutique winery and inn specializing in Lake Erie region wines.

== Notes ==
Ohio House of Representatives
Preceded by Dean DePiero	Minority Leader of the Ohio House of Representatives; 2003–2006	Succeeded by Joyce Beatty
Party political offices
Preceded by Rhine McLin; Acting	Chair of the Ohio Democratic Party; 2005–2014	Succeeded by David Pepper
