= Diana Fessler =

American politician

Member of the Ohio House of Representatives from the 79th district
- In office January 3, 2001-December 31, 2008
- Preceded by: Bob Netzley
- Succeeded by: Richard Adams

Personal details
- Party: Republican

Diana Fessler is a former Republican member of the Ohio House of Representatives, who represented the 79th District from 2001 to 2008 and lived in New Carlisle.
