= Earl Martin =

American politician

Member of the Ohio House of Representatives from the 57th district
- In office April 8, 2003-December 31, 2006
- Preceded by: Jeffrey Manning
- Succeeded by: Matt Lundy

Personal details
- Party: Republican

Earl Martin is a former member of the Ohio House of Representatives, succeeded by Matt Lundy. He is the son of Mayor Earl Martin of Rocky River, Ohio. Former Representative Martin operates Martin's Deli in Bay Village, Ohio and Avon, Ohio. His son serves in the United States Marines.
