= Geoffrey C. Smith (politician) =

American politician

Member of the Ohio House of Representatives from the 24th district
- In office January 5, 1999 – December 31, 2006
- Preceded by: Priscilla D. Mead
- Succeeded by: Ted Celeste

Personal details
- Party: Republican

Geoff Smith is an American former politician who was a member of the Ohio House of Representatives, representing the western part of Columbus from 1999 to 2006. Originally appointed, he went on to win re-election in 2000, 2002, and 2004 until he was defeated in the 2006 general election by Ted Celeste.
