= Larry L. Flowers =

American politician

Member of the Ohio House of Representatives from the 19th district
- In office January 3, 2001-December 31, 2008
- Preceded by: Jo Ann Davidson
- Succeeded by: Marian Harris

Personal details
- Born: May 6, 1952 (age 74) Newark, Ohio
- Party: Republican
- Spouse: Patty
- Profession: Fire chief

Larry L. Flowers is a former Republican member of the Ohio House of Representatives, representing the 19th District from 2001 to 2008. He currently is serving as the fire marshal for the state of Ohio.
