= Sally Conway Kilbane =

American politician (born 1942)

Member of the Ohio House of Representatives from the 16th district
- In office January 5, 1999 – December 31, 2006
- Preceded by: Ed Kasputis
- Succeeded by: Jennifer Brady

Personal details
- Born: November 11, 1942 (age 83) Cleveland, Ohio, U.S.
- Party: Republican

Sally Conway Kilbane (born November 11, 1942) is a former Republican member of the Ohio House of Representatives, representing the 16th District from 1999 to 2006.
