= Mike Gilb =

American politician

Member of the Ohio House of Representatives from the 76th district
- In office January 3, 2001 – December 31, 2006
- Preceded by: Chuck Brading
- Succeeded by: Cliff Hite

Personal details
- Party: Republican
- Spouse: Michelle Gilb

Mike Gilb is a former member of the Ohio House of Representatives, representing the 76th District from 2001 to 2006.
