= Thom Collier =

American politician

Member of the Ohio House of Representatives from the 90th district
- In office September 12, 2000-December 31, 2008
- Preceded by: Bill Harris
- Succeeded by: Margaret Ruhl

Personal details
- Party: Republican

Thom Collier is a current Knox County Commissioner, elected to the position in 2012, and former Republican member of the Ohio House of Representatives, representing the 90th District from 2000 to 2008.

In January 2012, he announced his intention to run for Knox County Commissioner. On March 6, 2012, he was chosen as the Republican nominee in the GOP primary. On November 5, 2012, he won a seat as a Knox County Commissioner, receiving 48.95% of the vote.

In 2010, he made an unsuccessful bid for the Republican nomination for the 19th Senate District, losing the primary election to Kris Jordan, 37.5% to 53.9%.
