= Linda Reidelbach =

American politician

Member of the Ohio House of Representatives from the 21st district
- In office January 3, 2001 – December 31, 2006
- Preceded by: Pat Tiberi
- Succeeded by: Kevin Bacon

Personal details
- Born: April 1, 1949 (age 77) Cincinnati, Ohio, U.S.
- Party: Republican

Linda Reidelbach (born April 1, 1949) is a former member of the Ohio House of Representatives, who served six years.

Reidelbach was a talk show host for Christian radio when she started her political career in 1992. She entered the race for Ohio's 15th congressional district as an independent against the Republican Deborah Pryce and the Democrat Richard Cordray, gaining 18 percent of the vote. In 1997, she ran unsuccessfully for a seat in the Columbus City Council. In 2000, she won the seat of the 26th district in the Ohio House of Representatives and sat in this body from 3 January 2001 to 31 December 2006, running successfully for its 21st district in 2002 and 2004.
