= Jim Aslanides =

American politician

Member of the Ohio House of Representatives from the 94th district
- In office June 30, 1999-December 31, 2008
- Preceded by: Joy Padgett
- Succeeded by: Troy Balderson

Personal details
- Party: Republican

Jim Aslanides is a former Republican member of the Ohio House of Representatives, representing the 94th District from 1999 to 2008.

He is the current president of the Ohio Oil & Gas Association.
