= Kathleen Chandler =

American politician (born 1932)

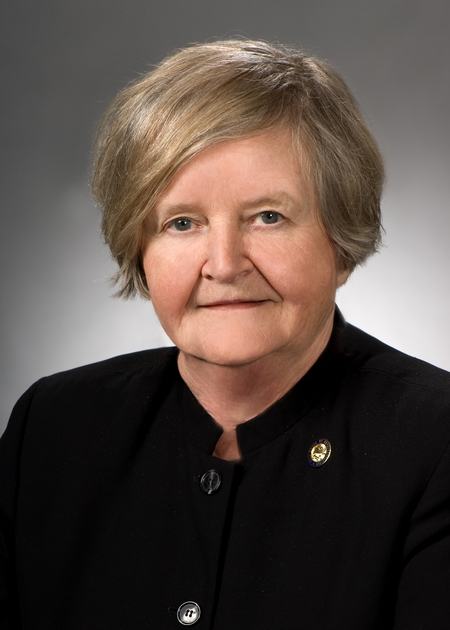

Member of the Ohio House of Representatives from the 68th district
- In office January 3, 2003 – December 31, 2010
- Preceded by: Ann H. Womer Benjamin
- Succeeded by: Kathleen Clyde

Personal details
- Born: September 19, 1932 (age 93) Detroit, Mi
- Party: Democratic
- Education: Michigan State University, Kent State University
- Profession: Legislator

Kathleen Chandler (born September 19, 1932) is a former Democratic member of the Ohio House of Representatives, who represented the 68th District from 2003–2010.
