= Chuck Calvert =

American politician (born 1930)

Member of the Ohio House of Representatives from the 69th district
- In office January 3, 1999 – December 31, 2006
- Preceded by: William G. Batchelder
- Succeeded by: William G. Batchelder

Personal details
- Born: 1938/1939
- Died: August 8, 2023 (aged 84)
- Party: Republican

Charles E. Calvert (1938/1939 – August 8, 2023) was the Chairman of the Ohio Elections Commission, and a member of the Ohio House of Representatives, succeeded by Bill Batchelder. Calvert was named as a potential successor to Bob Gibbs, who won election to Congress and vacated his seat in the Ohio Senate late in 2010, but he did not run. He died on August 8, 2023, at the age of 84.
