= Jim Trakas =

American politician

Member of the Ohio House of Representatives from the 17th district
- In office January 3, 1999 – December 31, 2006
- Preceded by: Mike Wise
- Succeeded by: Josh Mandel

Personal details
- Born: May 5, 1965 (age 61)
- Party: Republican
- Education: Ohio State University (BA)
- Website: Campaign website

Military service
- Allegiance: Ohio
- Branch/service: Ohio Military Reserve
- Years of service: 2013-present
- Rank: Major

James Peter Trakas (born May 5, 1965) is an American politician who served as a member of the Ohio House of Representatives from 1999 to 2006. He was the Republican nominee for the United States House of Representatives in Ohio's 10th congressional district in 2008.

== Education ==
Trakas earned a Bachelor of Arts degree from Ohio State University in social and behavioral sciences.

== Career ==
In 1991, Trakas was elected to the Independence City Council where he served two terms. In 1996 Trakas was elected chairman of The Republican Party of Cuyahoga County, serving until 2005.

In 1998, Trakas was elected to the Ohio House of Representatives representing the 15th district, later renumbered the 17th district, where he served until 2007. As State Representative Trakas served two terms as House Majority Whip, and was a member of the Finance and Appropriations Committee. During Trakas' tenure, he authored 14 bills into law, including the Third Frontier Program. In 2002, Trakas was named "Best Politician" by Cleveland Scene, an alternative newspaper.

Jim Trakas was the Republican nominee for the United States House of Representatives in Ohio's 10th congressional district, unsuccessfully challenging incumbent Democrat Dennis Kucinich. Trakas left office in 2006. In 2018, he was a candidate for the 6th district of the Ohio House of Representatives, losing narrowly to Democratic nominee Phil Robinson.

He currently serves with the rank of major in the Ohio Military Reserve.

== See also ==
- United States House of Representatives elections in Ohio, 2008
