= Catherine L. Barrett =

American politician (1941–2023)

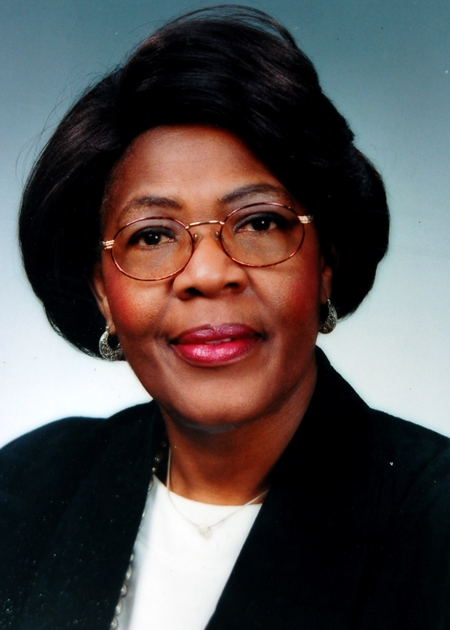

Member of the Ohio House of Representatives from the 32nd district
- In office January 3, 1999 – December 31, 2006
- Preceded by: Mark Mallory
- Succeeded by: Dale Mallory

Personal details
- Born: June 14, 1941 Cincinnati, Ohio
- Died: June 6, 2023
- Party: Democratic
- Spouse: Simon Barrett
- Children: 6
- Education: Union Institute & University

Catherine L. Barrett (June 14, 1941 – June 6, 2023) of Cincinnati, Ohio, United States was a former Democratic member of the Ohio House of Representatives, who served for eight years, the applicable term limit for that body. Previously, she served as mayor of Forest Park, Ohio.

She also served as a delegate for John Kerry on the Ohio delegation to the 2004 Democratic National Convention in Boston.
