= John Widowfield =

American politician

Member of the Ohio House of Representatives from the 42nd district
- In office February 12, 2001 – May 28, 2008
- Preceded by: Kevin Coughlin
- Succeeded by: Richard Nero

Personal details
- Party: Republican
- Education: Hiram College (BA); University of Akron (MBA)

John Widowfield is a former Republican member of the Ohio House of Representatives, representing the 42nd District from 2001 to 2008.

Widowfield was appointed to the Ohio House of Representatives in 2001. He resigned from the Ohio House of Representatives during his fourth term on May 28, 2008, amid an investigation into improper use of campaign funds on football tickets between 2004 and 2006. He pleaded guilty to two misdemeanor charges on October 28 and was fined $2,000.

He was elected twice to the Cuyahoga Falls City Council from 1998 to 2001. He graduated from Hiram College and obtained an MBA from the University of Akron. Widowfield is a former U.S. Army paratrooper who received numerous awards for meritorious service including: The Army Commendation Medal and The Joint Services Achievement Medal. Widowfield is married and the father of 2 children.
