= Todd Book =

American politician

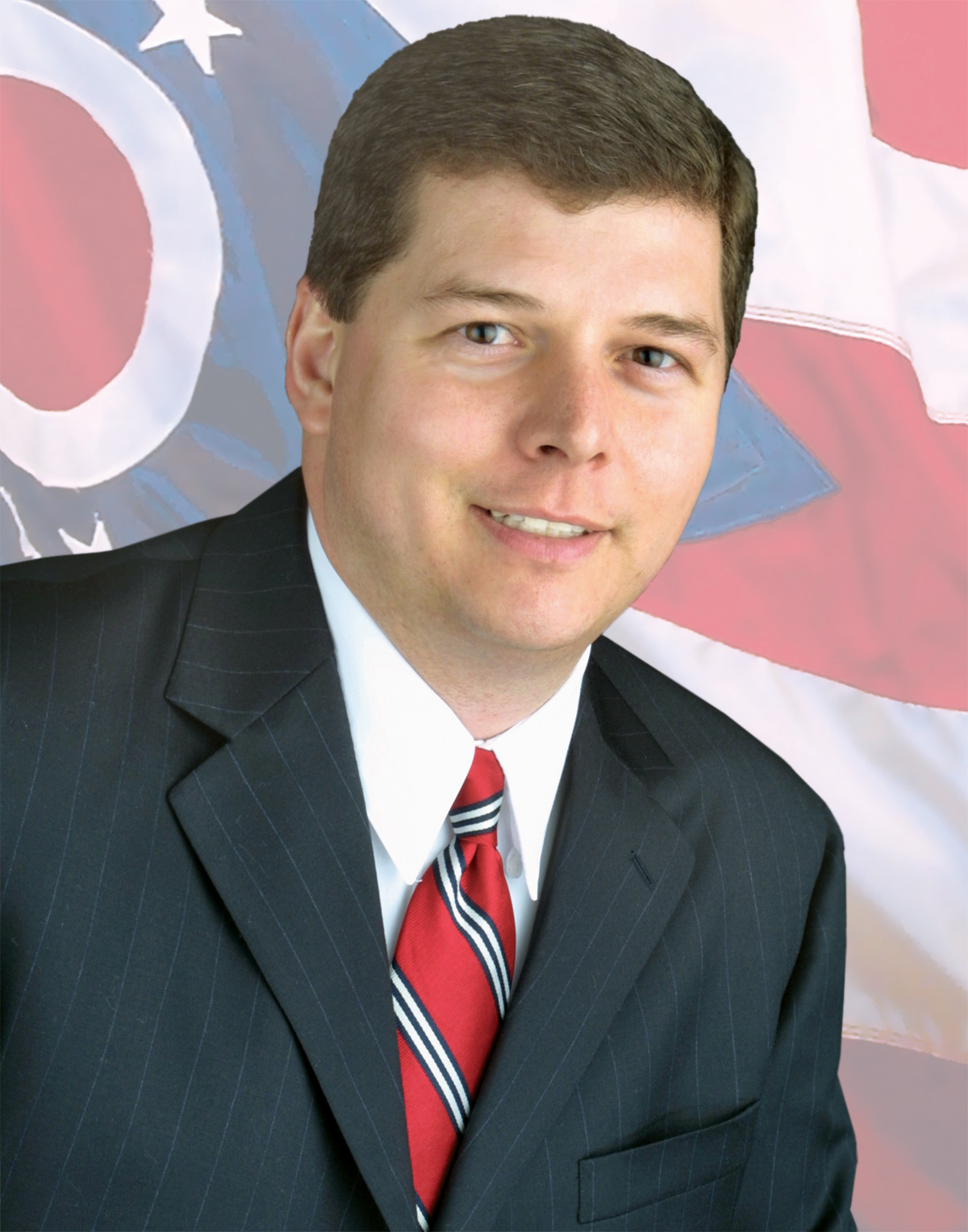

Member of the Ohio House of Representatives from the 89th district
- In office January 3, 2003-December 31, 2010
- Preceded by: William L. Ogg
- Succeeded by: Terry Johnson

Personal details
- Born: Portsmouth, Ohio
- Party: Democratic
- Education: Western Michigan University, BA, College of William and Mary, JD
- Profession: OSBA Director of Policy and Government Affairs

Todd Book is a former Democratic member of the Ohio House of Representatives who was first elected in 2002. He served the 89th House District, which includes all of Scioto County, the western half of Lawrence County and the eastern half of Adams County in Southern Ohio.

Book was raised in Portsmouth, Ohio. His father, Tom Book, operated a trenching business and his mother, Delores Book, raised Todd and his two sisters. Todd attended the local public high school, Portsmouth West High School. Book attended undergraduate college at Western Michigan University where he majored in Political Science. In 1990, Todd earned a Bachelor of Arts Degree with Honors. After completing his undergraduate studies, he enrolled at the College of William & Mary, Marshall-Wythe School of Law where he was awarded his Juris Doctor degree in 1993.

After law school, Todd returned to the Portsmouth, OH area where he started practicing law. He and his father started a small business, Old Hickory Golf Co., Ltd. The business conducts golf outings using hickory shafted clubs, period clothing and old style golf balls. He began teaching business law at Shawnee State University as an adjunct faculty member. In 1997, Todd Book married Emily. After joining with a local attorney, Howard Harcha Jr., in 1998 to form the law firm Harcha & Book, LLC, Todd and Emily had their first child, Cassidy Mae, in 1999. In 2001, Todd and Emily had a son, Avery Todd, and in 2006 they had another daughter, Meredith.

Book was elected to the Ohio House of Representatives in 2002 after a hotly contested race for the 89th House District's open seat. During his second term, Book was elected to be the Assistant House Minority Leader. In 2004, the Council of State Governments Midwestern Office selected Book as a Bowhay Institute for Legislative Leadership Fellow. Book served as the Chairman of the Rules and Reference Committee after the Democratic Party captured the majority in the Ohio House in 2008. Book left the House in 2010 due to term limits.

In 2009, Book explored running for the United States House of Representatives, but declined due to obligations in the Ohio House and lackluster fundraising.

In 2012, Book unsuccessfully ran for State School Board.

In 2010, Book began working for the Ohio State Bar Association as its Director of Policy and Government Affairs. He is the author of the "Word on the Square," a weekly blog that focuses on legislative issues, OSBA priority bills and general Statehouse news.
