= Lance Mason =

American politician and convicted murderer (born 1967)

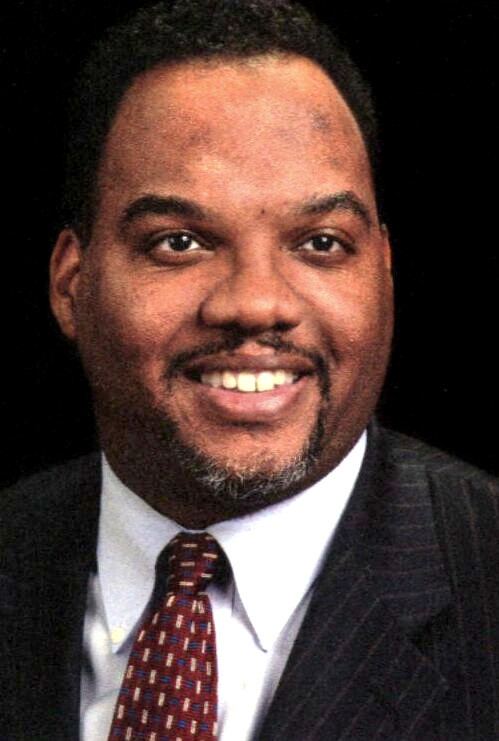
- Official portrait, c. 2007–2008

Member of the Ohio Senate from the 25th district
- In office January 2, 2007 – September 16, 2008
- Preceded by: Eric Fingerhut
- Succeeded by: Nina Turner

Member of the Ohio House of Representatives
- In office February 20, 2002 – December 31, 2006
- Preceded by: Peter Lawson Jones
- Succeeded by: Armond Budish
- Constituency: 11th district (2002–2003); 8th district (2003–2006)

Personal details
- Born: Lance Timothy Mason; August 26, 1967 (age 59) Shaker Heights, Ohio, U.S.
- Party: Democratic
- Spouse: Aisha Fraser (m. 2005; div. 2015)
- Education: College of Wooster (BA); University of Michigan (JD)

Lance Timothy Mason (born August 26, 1967) is an American convicted murderer and former politician, who served in various offices representing Cleveland, Ohio.

As a judge, he served on the Cuyahoga County Court of Common Pleas. He was a member of the Ohio Senate, representing the 25th District from 2007 to 2008. From 2002 to 2006, he was a member of the Ohio House of Representatives, where he served as Assistant Minority Whip during his final year. He was also an assistant prosecuting attorney for the county and was an aide to U.S. Representative Stephanie Tubbs Jones. In 2017, he worked as an official for the city of Cleveland under mayor Frank G. Jackson.

In 2019, he was sentenced to life in prison with the possibility of parole after 35 years for the murder of his ex-wife.

== Early life ==
Mason was born on August 26, 1967, and graduated from Shaker Heights High School. He received a Bachelor of Arts from the College of Wooster and Juris Doctor from the University of Michigan Law School in 1992.

== Political career ==
From 2002 to 2008, Mason was a member of the Ohio General Assembly, first as a state representative, and then state senator. In August 2008, Ohio governor Ted Strickland announced that he appointed Mason to be a Judge on the Cuyahoga County Court of Common Pleas after a vacancy arose.

In 2017, Mason was hired by the City of Cleveland as an official in the Frank G. Jackson administration, with the title of Minority Business Development Administrator.

== Murder and legal issues ==
On August 2, 2014, Mason was arrested and charged for beating his wife while he was driving and their children were in the backseat. Later that day, police seized ammunition and weapons from Mason's home, including shotguns, semiautomatic rifles, handguns, smoke grenades, a bulletproof vest, a sword, and over 2,500 rounds of ammunition. The couple, who were married in 2005, had separated the previous March. Their divorce was finalized on November 12, 2015. Mason pleaded guilty on August 13, 2015, to attempted felonious assault and domestic violence, and agreed to serve time in prison. On September 3, the Ohio Supreme Court suspended Mason from practicing law for being a convicted felon. Mason submitted his resignation as judge on September 15. The next day, he was sentenced to two years in prison; he was released after 9 months. During sentencing, the judge read from a police report which detailed how Mason punched his wife 20 times with his fist, smashed her head against the car's center console five times, and continued to beat her, bite her, and threaten her after she exited the car. As a convicted felon, Mason will never be allowed to serve as a judge in the future, but could practice law depending on the outcome of disciplinary action by the state Supreme Court.

=== Murder charge ===
On November 17, 2018, Mason stabbed his ex-wife, Aisha Fraser Mason, to death at a house that his sister rented and was owned by his ex-wife, in front of their two children. Mason took his ex-wife's SUV and fled the scene, striking a police cruiser and injuring the police officer standing inside of the opened door before he was arrested. On August 20, 2019, he pleaded guilty and on September 12, 2019, he was sentenced to life in prison with the possibility of parole after 35 years. As of April 13, 2026, he is imprisoned at Toledo Correctional Institution in Toledo, Ohio.
