= Ohio's 82nd House of Representatives district =

American legislative district

Ohio's 82nd State House of Representatives district
Representative
Roy Klopfenstein; R–Haviland
- Population (2020): 114,464

Ohio's 82nd House of Representatives district is currently represented by Republican Roy Klopfenstein. It is located in the western part of the state and includes all of Paulding, Putnam, and Van Wert counties, and a portion of southern Defiance County.

== List of members representing the district ==
Member	Party	Years	General Assembly	Electoral history
District established January 2, 1967.
James R. Panno (Youngstown)	Democratic	January 2, 1967 – June 9, 1970	107th 108th	Elected in 1966. Re-elected in 1968. Died.
George D. Tablack (Campbell)	Democratic	June 9, 1970 – December 31, 1972	108th 109th	Appointed to finish Panno's term. Re-elected in 1970. Redistricted to the 52nd district.
Mike Oxley (Findlay)	Republican	January 1, 1973 – June 25, 1981	110th 111th 112th 113th 114th	Elected in 1972. Re-elected in 1974. Re-elected in 1976. Re-elected in 1978. Re-elected in 1980. Retired to run for U.S. Representative.
Vacant		June 25, 1981 – October 7, 1981	114th	
Charlie Earl (Fostoria)	Republican	October 7, 1981 – December 31, 1982	114th	Appointed to finish Oxley's term. Redistricted to the 80th district.
John Stozich (Findlay)	Republican	January 3, 1983 – December 31, 1992	115th 116th 117th 118th 119th	Elected in 1982. Re-elected in 1984. Re-elected in 1986. Re-elected in 1988. Re-elected in 1990. Retired.
Richard Hodges	Republican	January 4, 1993 – December 31, 1998	120th 121st 122nd	Elected in 1992. Re-elected in 1994. Re-elected in 1996. Retired.
Steve Buehrer (Delta)	Republican	January 4, 1999 – December 31, 2002	123rd 124th	Elected in 1998. Re-elected in 2000. Redistricted to the 74th district.
Steve Reinhard (Bucyrus)	Republican	January 6, 2003 – December 31, 2008	125th 126th 127th	Redistricted from the 90th district and re-elected in 2002. Re-elected in 2004. Re-elected in 2006. Term-limited.
Jeffrey McClain (Upper Sandusky)	Republican	January 5, 2009 – December 31, 2012	128th 129th	Elected in 2008. Re-elected in 2010. Redistricted to the 87th district.
Tony Burkley (Payne)	Republican	January 7, 2013 – December 31, 2016	130th 131st	Elected in 2012. Re-elected in 2014. Lost renomination.
Craig Riedel (Defiance)	Republican	January 2, 2017 – December 31, 2022	132nd 133rd 134th	Elected in 2016. Re-elected in 2018. Re-elected in 2020. Retired to run for U.S. Representative.
Roy Klopfenstein (Haviland)	Republican	January 2, 2023 – present	135th	Elected in 2022.

== Election results ==
=== 2020 ===
2020 General election
Party	Candidate	Votes	%
Republican	Craig Riedel (Incumbent)	45,059	100%
Independent	Elecia Wobler	1,462	3.1%
Total votes		45,059	100%
Republican hold			

=== 2018 ===
The 2018 election in Ohio will be held on November 6, 2018.

Incumbent representative Craig Riedel is eligible for re-election and is widely expected to run again.

Party	Candidate	Votes	%
Republican	Craig Riedel (Incumbent)	29,519	73.54%
Democratic	Aden Wyatt Baker	10,622	26.46%
Total votes		40,141	100%
Republican hold			

==== Candidates ====
Declared

- Craig Riedel, incumbent representative

==== Candidates ====
Declared

- Aden Baker, high school student and Democratic Central Committeeman

==== 2016 ====
District 82 was at the center of a bitter primary campaign between Incumbent representative Tony Burkley and his challenger, former Nucor-Vulcraft salesman Craig Riedel. Both campaigned on the ideals of fiscal and social conservatism, with the Riedel campaign portraying Burkley as a 'career politician' who didn't understand the needs of the district.

Campaign themes included the Charter Schools/School Voucher program, the Ohio Budget, and making Ohio a "right-to-work" state.

Reidel went on to defeat Burkley in the primary, with the latter winning only his home county (Paulding).

2016 Republican Primary
Party	Candidate	Votes	%
Republican	Craig Riedel	11,977	53.10%
Republican	Tony Burkley (Incumbent)	10,578	46.90%
Total votes		22,555	100%

2016 General election
Party	Candidate	Votes	%
Republican	Craig Riedel	39,457	100%
Total votes		39,457	100%

=== 2014 ===
In 2014, incumbent representative Tony Burkley faced Brett Eley of Wapakoneta. Burkley won the primary in a landslide and went on to win the general election unopposed.

2014 General election
Party	Candidate	Votes	%
Republican	Tony Burkley	22,735	100%
Total votes		22,735	100%
Republican hold			

=== 2012 ===
In 2012, former Paulding County Commissioner Tony Burkley ran unopposed in the Republican primary.

Pete Schlegel, a country musician and farmer from Defiance County, ran as an independent. He criticized Burkley for his history in local politics and ran an "outsider" campaign. Burkley handily defeated Schlegel in the general election, 59-41%

2012 General election
Party	Candidate	Votes	%
Republican	Tony Burkley	27,922	59.04%
Independent	Pete Schlegel	19,423	40.96%
Total votes		47,345	100%
Republican hold			

== See also ==
- Ohio House of Representatives
