= Mark Wagoner =

American politician

Mark Wagoner Jr.

Member of the Ohio Senate from the 2nd district
- In office January 15, 2008 – December 31, 2012
- Preceded by: Randy Gardner
- Succeeded by: Randy Gardner

Member of the Ohio House of Representatives from the 46th district
- In office January 3, 2005 – January 15, 2008
- Preceded by: Lynn Olman
- Succeeded by: Barbara Sears

Personal details
- Born: September 18, 1971 (age 55) Toledo, Ohio
- Party: Republican
- Spouse: Merideth
- Education: Georgetown University, Ohio State University
- Profession: Attorney

Mark D. Wagoner, Jr. (born September 18, 1971) is an American politician and former Republican member of the Ohio Senate and Ohio House of Representatives.

== Career ==
Wagoner is a lifetime resident of Ottawa Hills and graduated from Ottawa Hills High School. Wagoner obtained degrees from both Georgetown University and the Ohio State University before practicing law in the Toledo area. He is a partner as Shumaker, Loop and Kendrick L.L.P.

With incumbent Lynn Olman term limited and unable to run for a fifth term, Wagoner entered the race for the 46th District of the Ohio House of Representatives in 2004. He was unopposed in the primary election, and faced Nancy Patrick Greeley in the fall. He was reelected to his seat in 2006.

== Ohio Senate ==
Wagoner was originally mentioned as a potential successor to state Senator Randy Gardner late in 2007. However, his move to the Ohio Senate was expedited when Congressman Paul Gillmor unexpectedly died. This set off a set of legislative switches where Representative Bob Latta was elected to Gillmor's Congressional seat, allowing term-limited Senator Gardner to fill his former Ohio House seat. Therefore, with the 2nd Senate seat now vacant, Wagoner was appointed early to the seat he was seeking.

Wagoner faced two others in the 2008 primary election, but won with over 74% of the vote. He faced Democrat Jackie Brown in the general election, but again won easily.

Following his election to the Senate, Wagoner was elected Majority Whip by his colleagues. However, early in 2010, Wagoner resigned his post and was replaced by Senator Steve Buehrer. Wagoner cited personal and professional problems as the reason for him leaving his post, but many cite his controversial speech in support of Governor Ted Strickland's decision to raise the income tax rate in Ohio.

For the 129th General Assembly, Wagoner served as Chairman of the Judiciary Committee and the Rules and Reference Committee. He also served on the War of 1812 Bicentennial Commission. Wagoner did not seek reelection in 2012.

== Post-Senate Career ==
Following his time in the Ohio General Assembly, Wagoner returned to practice law full time with Shumaker, Loop & Kendrick, LLP, with a focus on antitrust and distribution law. He was appointed as one of twenty public members of the Ohio Constitutional Modernization Commission and is a member of the Ohio Republican Party State Central Committee. Wagoner is active in the community serving on many boards and commissions, including the Ohio Legal Assistance Foundation, the National Statuary Collection Commission, Kids Unlimited, Valentine Theater, and the Great Lakes Maritime Museum. He has also been appointed by the President of the Ohio State Bar Association to a special task force regarding judicial elections in Ohio.

== Lucas County Republican Party Chairman ==
In the summer of 2017, Wagoner announced his intention to run for Lucas County Republican Party Chairman. On February 7, 2018 Wagoner supporters filed 276 petitions to run as candidates for the Lucas County Republican Central Committee. The incumbent, Jon Stainbrook, filed 312 individual precincts. On June 9, 2018, Wagoner won election as the Lucas County Republican Party Chairman.
