= Kurt Erichsen =

American cartoonist

- Born: Kurt Erichsen Coos Bay, Oregon
- Area: Cartoonist
- Notable works: "Murphy's Manor"
- Awards: Gay/Lesbian Press Association award for Outstanding Achievement in Illustration

Kurt Erichsen is an openly gay cartoonist and civil engineer, creator of the syndicated LGBT-themed comic strip "Murphy's Manor," his most notable work, which ran for 1183 weekly strips from the 1980s until 2008 and through strip 1205 in 2019.

== Biography ==
Cover of Under the Covers by Kurt Erichsen

Erichsen was born on December 18, 1954, in Coos Bay, Oregon. He attended Oregon State University, receiving a Bachelor of Science in Civil Engineering. The following year he received a master's degree in Sanitary Engineering from Michigan State University. In 1979 he moved to Toledo, Ohio, where he became vice president of environmental planning for the Toledo Metropolitan Area Council of Governments.

== Publications ==
=== "Murphy's Manor" ===
In 1980, he began producing "Murphy's Manor," a comic strip focusing on the lives of gay men living together in the titular manor, in the fictional town of Black Swamp, Ohio. The beginnings of "Murphy's Manor" were difficult. Erichsen's friend gave him a gay bar guide in which the publisher wanted someone to draw cartoons for two newspapers. This did not work out and so Erichsen decided to publish "Murphy's Manor" on his own. The series was carried in about 70 papers over the course of its run, which continued until 2008.

In 2019 Erichsen published Murphy's Manor: the 30-Year Wedding. The book covers gay relationships and the LGBT community's attempts at marriage equality over the years. The 22 new strips are about gay marriage as it finally became legal. "Murphy's Manor" cartoons and "Saboteur" from Gay Comix no. 1 appear in La Revue des Bandes Dessinées LGBT.

Aside from the main series of "Murphy's Manor," there was a side series called "Murphy's Library," which ran from 1987 to 1990 and produced 16 comic strips. Lambda Rising Book Report was where the first 12 comic strips of "Murphy's Library" were published, with the remaining published in Meatmen.

=== "The Sparkle Spinsters" ===
Another series he produced was "The Sparkle Spinsters" about a trio of gay friends, inspired by Gilbert Shelton's Freak Brothers. There were four stories in Gay Comics issues no. 6 (1985), no. 7 (1986), no. 8 (1986), and no. 12 (1988). The respective titles of the stories in the Gay Comics are as follows:

- "The Sparkle Spinsters: Stains on the Sofa,"
- "The Sparkle Spinsters: Home Movies,"
- "The Sparkle Spinsters: In Midsummer Night's Super Stud," and
- "The Sparkle Spinsters: In the Ghetto."

There was one story published in Meatmen issue 19 (1994) titled "The Sparkle Spinsters: Little Red Riding Crop."

=== GLiB Talk ===
He also produced a single-panel syndicated series called "GLIB Talk" from 2000 to 2006. These single-panel comics served as a platform for Erichsen to air his views on gay pride and gay rights.

== Contributions ==
Erichsen's work has been published in eight issues of Gay Comix and was a regular feature in Meatmen.

=== Gay Comix ===
The issues of Gay Comix Erichsen published stories in were issues:

- no. 1 (1980) "Saboteur,"
- no. 3 (1982) "Weekend Revolutionaries,"
- no. 6 (1985) "The Sparkle Spinsters: Stains on the Sofa,"
- no. 7 (1986) "The Sparkle Spinsters: Home Movies,"
- no. 8 (1986) "The Sparkle Spinsters: In Midsummer Night's Super Stud,"
- no. 12 (1988) "The Sparkle Spinsters: In the Ghetto,"
- no. 20 (1993) "Gender Bender,"
- no. 22 (1993) "Honeymoon," and
- no. 25 (1998) "I've Got a Secret."

=== Meatmen ===
The works he contributed to Meatmen were in issues:

- no. 12 (1991) "Robot Love,"
- no. 15 (1993) "The Nine Billion Names of Penis,"
- no. 19 (1994) "The Sparkle Spinsters: Little Red Riding Crop,"
- no. 20 (1997) "A Wedding in the Family,"
- no. 21 (1997) "Link-Up," and
- no. 22 (1997) "Straight Man's Burden."

=== Fanzines ===
Erichsen has been working in science fiction fanzines since the late 1960s. His own fanzine is Taciturn, which has had three issues. His work also appears in other fanzines such as Challenger, Mimosa and Argentus.

=== Other works ===
He also drew commissioned illustrations for Instinct magazine, Lambda Rising Book Report, and Fairy Flicks. In 1989, he and cartoonist Bruce Billings co-produced a tête-bêche book – a single bound volume with both covers formatted as the "front" – as Under the Covers (Erichsen's cover) and Between the Sheets! (Billings').

== Awards and accomplishments ==
=== For comics and art ===
Erichsen won the Gay/Lesbian Press Association award for Outstanding Achievement in Illustration in 1985 and 1987. Erichsen has long been active in science-fiction fandom, producing a great deal of fan art, and in 2002 he received the Rotsler Award for his work from SCIFI Inc. In May 2015, he was a featured panelist at the first Queers & Comics conference, as one of the "Pioneers of Queer Men's Comics". During this conference, Erichsen discussed his thoughts, feelings, and motivations behind his various works.

=== For civil engineering ===
While working at the TMACOG, Erichsen aided in restoring the Ottawa River and the Maumee Bay State Park. Another of Erichsen's accomplishments at the TMACOG was to improve the Stormwater Coalition of Wood and Lucas County which led to the aid of the farming community by managing the stormwater in the region. Many at the TMACOG credit and acknowledge the work that Erichsen did on the 208 plan, a plan on how to manage sewer lines, wastewater treatment, and septic systems in five counties in Ohio and Michigan. In 2009, he received the National Association of Regional Councils' John Bosley Award for his work with the TMACOG.
