= Cliff Hite =

American politician, teacher, and football coach

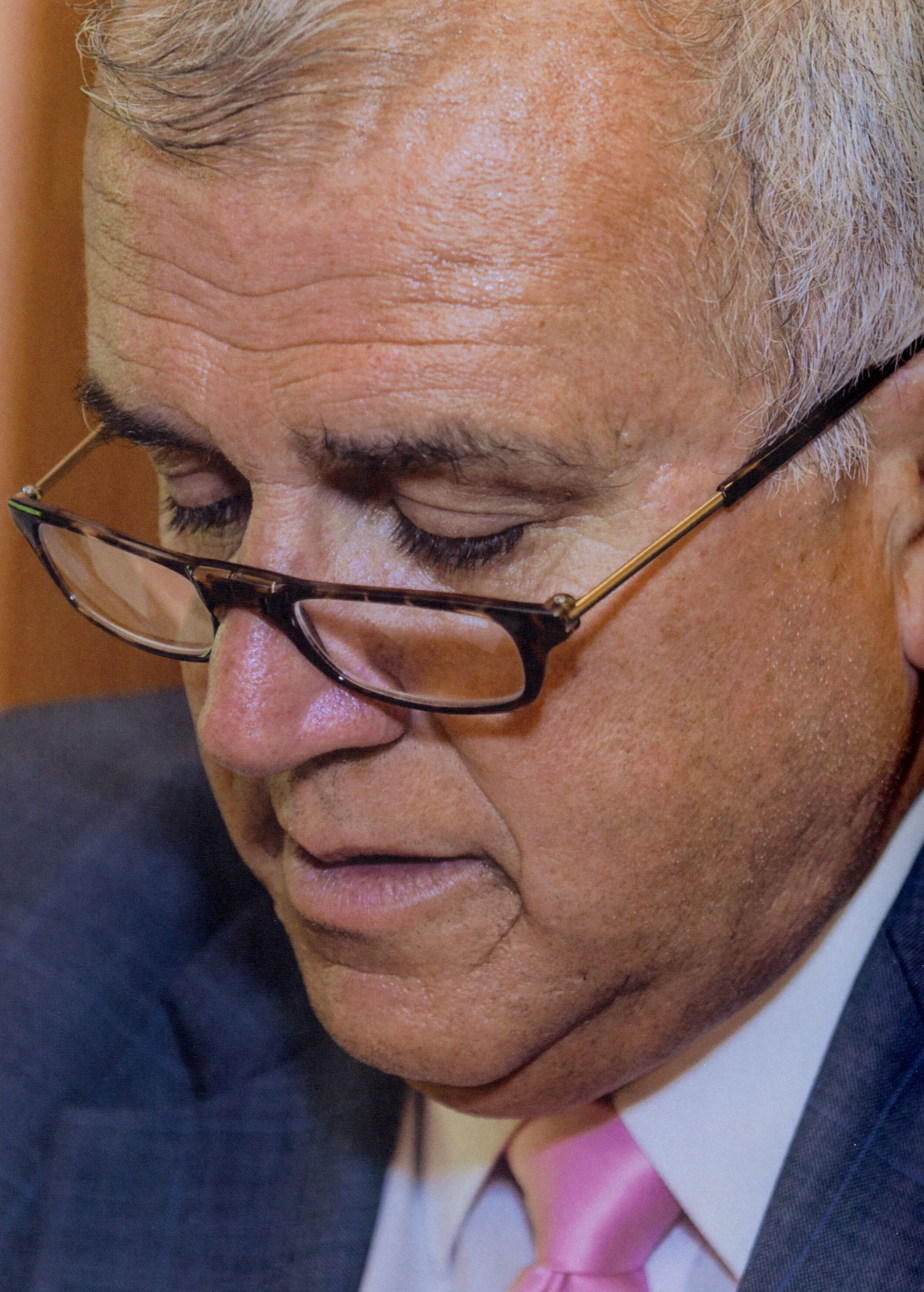

Member of the Ohio Senate from the 1st district
- In office February 1, 2011 – October 17, 2017
- Preceded by: Steve Buehrer
- Succeeded by: Rob McColley

Member of the Ohio House of Representatives from the 76th district
- In office January 1, 2007 – February 1, 2011
- Preceded by: Mike Gilb
- Succeeded by: Robert Sprague

Personal details
- Born: September 4, 1954 (age 71) Findlay, Ohio, U.S.
- Party: Republican
- Education: Findlay High School (1972)
- Alma mater: University of Kentucky (B.S. 1977)
- Profession: Teacher, Coach

Cliff Hite (born September 4, 1954) is a Republican politician who formerly represented the 1st district of the Ohio Senate from 2011 to 2017. Before serving in the senate, he represented the Ohio House of Representatives from 2007 to 2011. He was the Chairman of the Senate Agriculture Committee before resigning on October 17, 2017.

== Teaching career ==
Hite graduated in Findlay, Ohio from Findlay High School in 1972, and obtained his B.S. degree from the University of Kentucky in 1977 in Secondary Studies with an emphasis in social studies.

Upon graduating from UK, Hite served in four school districts as teacher. From 1977 to 1980, Hite taught in Danville, Kentucky at Danville High School. In 1980, Hite returned to Findlay for the first of three years as a teacher at Findlay High School. Hite spent 1983 to 1996 teaching at Bryan High School in Bryan, Ohio. In 1996, Hite returned to Findlay High School where he remained until 2006 when he was elected to the Ohio House of Representatives.

The decisions which probably garnered Hite the most national attention during his coaching tenure were those surrounding Ben Roethlisberger, the former starting quarterback for the Pittsburgh Steelers. Roethlisberger did not play quarterback until his senior year of 1999-2000, giving way to Cliff Hite's son, Ryan Hite. Roethslisberger played college quarterback at Division I Miami University in Oxford, Ohio. Roethlisberger holds every major passing record at the school and a number of passing records in the Mid-American Conference, although he only played for three years. Ryan Hite played college wide receiver at Division III Denison University.

== Political career ==
Hite was elected to the Ohio House of Representatives in 2006, defeating Democrat John Kostyo with 59.94% of the vote. In 2008, he won reelection with 98.39% of the vote, and in 2010, won a third term with 70.78% of the vote over Democrat Jeffrey Detmer.

Representative Hite was sworn into a third term on January 3, 2011, however, with Senator Steve Buehrer's pending resignation from the Ohio Senate to head the Ohio Bureau of Workers' Compensation under Governor-elect John Kasich, Hite was mentioned as a possible successor.

It was announced that Hite would be appointed to the Senate in January 2011. Upon announcement of the appointment, Senate President Tom Niehaus stated “Cliff Hite knows the many challenges that are facing our state, but he is not afraid to roll up his sleeves and delve into the issues.”

Hite won reelection to complete the unexpired term in 2012 unopposed, and again in 2014 for a full term.

Hite, along with fellow senator Randy Gardner successfully proposed "Sierra's Law" (which was named after Sierah Joughin, who was murdered by James D. Worley). Originally, the bill was intended to allow the public to search on a website for offenders with the qualifying convictions, similar to a sex offender registry. After several hearings, where some opponents such as the ACLU argued that the bill did nothing to protect the public and created privacy concerns, the bill was changed so that residents must visit their local sheriff's office to request a search be performed. In November 2017, "Sierah's Law" was introduced to the Ohio Senate as Senate Bill 231. Joughin's mother spoke before legislators in November 2018, urging them to pass the bill. It was passed on December 6, 2018, and signed into law by Governor John Kasich on December 19. It went into effect on March 20, 2019.

=== Resignation ===
He abruptly resigned on October 17, 2017 citing "inappropriate behavior" and "failing health" as reasons for his resignation. News reports stated that prior to his resignation, Hite had repeatedly propositioned a state employee for sex.
