= Ohio's 2nd senatorial district =

American legislative district

Ohio's 2nd State Senate district
Senator
Theresa Gavarone; R–Bowling Green
- Demographics: 85.1% White; 5.4% Black; 5% Hispanic; 2.3% Asian; 1.9% Native American; 0.1% Hawaiian/Pacific Islander
- Population (2020) • Voting age • Citizens of voting age: 344,171; 272,502; 261,678

Ohio's 2nd senatorial district is now composed of Erie, Ottawa, and Wood counties along with the Western section of Lucas County. It now encompasses the House Districts of 44, 47, and 49.

The seat has been held by Theresa Gavarone following her appointment in February 2019.

== Historically ==
Before the 2023 redistricting, Ohio's 2nd senatorial district was located in northwestern Ohio. It stretched along the Great Lakes. A multi-county district, it comprises the counties of Erie, Ottawa and Wood, as well as, portions of the counties of Fulton and Lucas. It encompassed Ohio House of Representatives districts 3, 47 and 89. It has a Cook PVI of R+7.

== List of senators ==
Senator	Party	Term	Notes
Paul Gillmor	Republican	January 3, 1967 – December 31, 1988	Gillmor won election to the United States Congress.
Betty Montgomery	Republican	January 3, 1989 – January 2, 1995	Montgomery won election as Ohio Attorney General.
Tim Greenwood	Republican	January 3, 1995 – October 5, 1995	Greenwood resigned for personal reasons.
Steve Yarbrough	Republican	October 5, 1995 – December 31, 1996	Yarbrough opted not to seek re-election.
Bob Latta	Republican	January 6, 1997 – December 31, 2000	Latta opted to seek election to the Ohio House of Representatives.
Randy Gardner	Republican	January 3, 2001 – January 2, 2008	Gardner resigned to take a seat in the Ohio House of Representatives
Mark Wagoner	Republican	January 15, 2008 – December 31, 2012	Wagoner opted not to seek re-election.
Randy Gardner	Republican	January 7, 2013 – January 16, 2019	Gardner resigned to become Chancellor of the Ohio Department of Higher Education.
Theresa Gavarone	Republican	February 6, 2019 – current	Gavarone was appointed to fill the unexpired term of former Senator Randy Gardner.
