= Derek Merrin =

American politician (born 1986)

- Merrin in 2026

Member of the Ohio House of Representatives
- In office August 2, 2016 – January 3, 2025
- Preceded by: Barbara Sears
- Succeeded by: Elgin Rogers Jr.
- Constituency: 47th district (2016–2023); 42nd district (2023–2025)

Personal details
- Born: Derek Scott Merrin; January 4, 1986 (age 40) Smithtown, New York, U.S.
- Party: Republican
- Education: Owens Community College (attended); University of Toledo (BA); Bowling Green State University (MPA)
- Website: Campaign website

Derek Scott Merrin (born January 4, 1986) is an American politician who previously served as the state representative for the 42nd District of the Ohio House of Representatives. He was the Republican nominee for Ohio's 9th congressional district in 2024, where he was narrowly defeated by incumbent Marcy Kaptur. Merrin was the Republican nominee in Ohio's 9th district in the 2026 election, again losing to Kaptur.

== Life and career ==
Merrin was born in Smithtown, New York on Long Island, and moved to Waterville, Ohio, with his family when he was thirteen years old. His father, Russ Merrin, was a public-school teacher and pastored Monclova Road Baptist Church for twenty-three years. Merrin's mother, Norma, was a registered nurse. Merrin is a graduate of Monclova Christian Academy. In addition, Merrin holds a Bachelor of Arts degree from the University of Toledo and a Master of Public Administration degree from Bowling Green State University. He attended Owens Community College before transferring to UT.

Merrin was elected to the Waterville City Council, a city of just over 6,000 people, at the age of nineteen. Two years later, he was elected Mayor. Along with his time in public office, Merrin previously worked for Ohio Auditor Dave Yost. In 2012 he was named 'Thirty Conservatives Under Thirty' by Red Alert Politics.

== Ohio House of Representatives ==
=== Elections ===
With Representative Barbara Sears term-limited in 2016, Merrin entered the race to succeed her. He won a three-way primary against Republicans Vicki Donovan-Lyle and Kevin Haddad, with over 45% of the vote.

Sears resigned from the seat before the end of her term to take a position in the administration of Ohio Governor John Kasich. As the winner of the Republican primary, Ohio House Republicans led by Speaker of the House Cliff Rosenberger appointed Merrin to serve the remainder of Sears' term. He won the ensuing general election over Democrat Lauri Cooper.

Merrin was re-elected in 2018 and 2020, with nearly 60% of the vote each time. Following re-districting, Merrin's district was made substantially more Democratic, losing conservative western Lucas County while adding parts of the city of Toledo and inner ring suburbs. Despite this, Merrin carried the Democrat-leaning (D+2) 47th House District by nearly eight points, 53.9%-46.1% over Democrat Erika White.

=== Tenure ===
Merrin was sworn into office on August 2, 2016.

In September 2017, Merrin passed a tax break for prescription eyeglasses and contact lenses.

In 2017, he introduced an amendment that would place authority over lead-safety regulations with the Ohio Department of Health, preempting local lead-safety rental housing ordinances such as Toledo's. He also introduced legislation that year that would count weekends and holidays as part of the three-day notice period required before a landlord can begin eviction proceedings; the bill did not advance out of committee.

In 2019, Governor John Kasich signed Epinephrine Accessibility Act into law. The law was originally proposed by Merrin as House Bill 101. The law allows pharmacists to substitute a brand-name epinephrine auto-injector with a pharmaceutically equivalent generic one.

In 2022, Merrin lost the speaker election to Jason Stephens, who had bipartisan support, by 54 to 43 votes.

== Personal life ==
Merrin is a real estate investor who owns five rental properties in Toledo.

== Electoral history ==
=== 2016 ===
2016 Ohio House of Representatives District 47 Republican primary
Party	Candidate	Votes	%
Republican	Derek Merrin	8,765	45.6%
Republican	Vicki L. Donovan-Lyle	5,751	29.8%
Republican	Kevin G. Haddad	4,739	24.6%
Total votes		19,255	100.0

2016 Ohio House of Representatives District 47 general election
Party	Candidate	Votes	%
Republican	Derek Merrin	36,446	60.85
Democratic	Lauri Cooper	23,449	39.15
Total votes		59,895	100.00

2018 Ohio House of Representatives District 47 Republican primary
Party	Candidate	Votes	%
Republican	Derek Merrin	5,431	64.6
Republican	Barbara Lang	2,981	35.4
Total votes		8,412	100.0

2018 Ohio House of Representatives District 47 general election
Party	Candidate	Votes	%
Republican	Derek Merrin	29,476	58.0
Democratic	Gary Newnham	21,377	42.0
Total votes		50,853	100.0

2020 Ohio House of Representatives District 47 Republican primary
Party	Candidate	Votes	%
Republican	Derek Merrin	5,290	100.0
Total votes		5,290	100.0

2020 Ohio House of Representatives District 47 general election
Party	Candidate	Votes	%
Republican	Derek Merrin	40,445	58.6
Democratic	Nancy Larson	28,538	41.4
Total votes		68,983	100.0

2022 Ohio House of Representatives District 42 Republican primary
Party	Candidate	Votes	%
Republican	Derek Merrin	2,016	100.0
Total votes		2,016	100.0

2022 Ohio House of Representatives District 42 general election
Party	Candidate	Votes	%
Republican	Derek Merrin	22,594	53.9
Democratic	Erika White	19,325	46.1
Total votes		41,919	100.0

2024 Ohio's 9th congressional district Republican primary
Party	Candidate	Votes	%
Republican	Derek Merrin	27,632	52.5
Republican	Craig Riedel	18,072	34.3
Republican	Steve Lankenau	6,946	13.2
Total votes		52,650	100.0

2024 Ohio's 9th congressional district general election
Party	Candidate	Votes	%
Democratic	Marcy Kaptur	181,098	48.27
Republican	Derek Merrin	178,716	47.63
Libertarian	Tom Pruss	15,381	4.10
Total votes		375,195	100.00

2026 Ohio's 9th congressional district Republican primary
Party	Candidate	Votes	%
Republican	Derek Merrin	22,775	43.6
Republican	Josh Williams	13,403	25.7
Republican	Madison Sheahan	10,583	20.3
Republican	Alea Nadeem	2,794	5.4
Republican	Anthony Bruce Campbell	2,631	5.0
Total votes		52,186	100.0
