= Tony Burkley =

American politician

Member of the Ohio House of Representatives from the 82nd district
- In office January 7, 2013 – December 31, 2016
- Preceded by: Bruce Goodwin
- Succeeded by: Craig Riedel

Personal details
- Party: Republican
- Spouse: Nancy

Tony Burkley is a former Republican member of the Ohio House of Representatives, representing the 82nd district from 2013 to 2016. He was elected in 2012, defeating independent Pete Schlegel with 59% of the vote. He also contested a seat for the 2006 election, but lost the Republican primary to Lynn Wachtmann. Before his election to the Ohio House, Burkley served as commissioner of Paulding County, Ohio. In 2016, Burkley lost the Republican nomination for the seat to Craig Riedel.
