= Tim Brown (Ohio politician) =

American politician

Tim Wayne Brown

President of the Toledo Metropolitan Area Council of Governments
- In office July 20, 2016 – August 31, 2023

Member of the Ohio House of Representatives from the 3rd district
- In office January 1, 2013 – July 30, 2016
- Preceded by: Randy Gardner
- Succeeded by: Theresa Gavarone

Personal details
- Born: October 25, 1962 (age 63) Omaha, Nebraska
- Party: Republican
- Education: Bowling Green State University
- Occupation: Legislator

Tim W. Brown (born October 25, 1962) is an American politician who has served as the President of the Toledo Metropolitan Area Council of Governments since 2016. He previously served in the Ohio House of Representatives, representing the 3rd District from 2013 to 2016.

== Life and career ==
Brown graduated from Miamisburg High School in 1981. Brown received a bachelor's degree in business from Bowling Green State University in 1986. He formerly served as a Wood County Commissioner and as a district representative for United States Congressman Paul Gillmor. In 2013, Brown completed Harvard University's John F. Kennedy School of Government program for Senior Executives in State and Local Government as a David Bohnett Foundation LGBTQ Victory Institute Leadership Fellow.

== Ohio House of Representatives ==
A member of the Ohio Republican Party, Brown represents the 3rd District. He won his first term in 2012 to succeed Randy Gardner by defeating Democrat Kelly Wicks and Libertarian Nathan Eberly with 51% of the vote.

Brown is the first openly gay man to serve in the Ohio state legislature, and only the second LGBT person following Nickie Antonio. He will also be one of just two openly gay Republican state legislators in the United States, alongside Pennsylvania state representative Mike Fleck.

== Electoral history ==
Election results
Year	Office	Election	Subject	Party	Votes	%	Opponent	Party	Votes	%	Opponent	Party	Votes	%
2012	Ohio House of Representatives	General	Tim Brown	Republican	30,834	51.39%	Kelly Wicks	Democratic	26,385	43.98%	Nathan Eberly	Libertarian	2,780	4.63%
2014	Ohio House of Representatives	General	Tim Brown	Republican	21,311	62.92%	Steve Long	Democratic	10,571	31.21%	Nathan Eberly	Libertarian	1,987	5.87%
