= Theresa Gavarone =

American politician (born 1966)

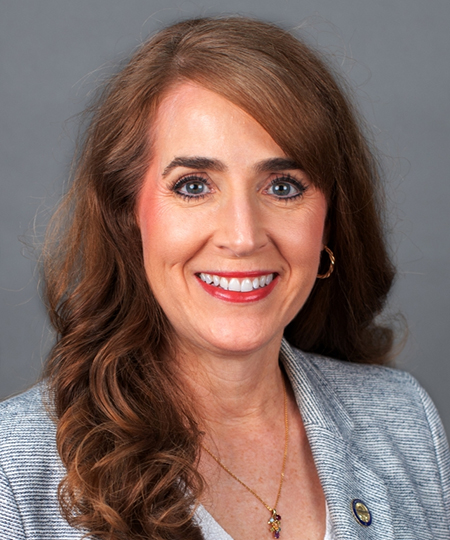
- Official portrait, c. 2019

Majority Leader of the Ohio Senate
- Incumbent
- Assumed office January 6, 2025
- Preceded by: Rob McColley

Member of the Ohio Senate from the 2nd district
- Incumbent
- Assumed office February 6, 2019
- Preceded by: Randy Gardner

Member of the Ohio House of Representatives from the 3rd district
- In office August 2, 2016 – February 6, 2019
- Preceded by: Tim Brown
- Succeeded by: Haraz Ghanbari

Personal details
- Born: June 30, 1966 (age 60) Dayton, Ohio, U.S.
- Party: Republican
- Spouse: Jim Gavarone
- Children: 3
- Education: Bowling Green State University (BS); University of Toledo (JD)

Theresa Gavarone (born June 30, 1966) is an American attorney, politician, and businesswoman serving as a member of the Ohio Senate for the 2nd district. A Republican, Gavarone was first appointed to the Senate in 2019 after serving in the Ohio House of Representatives from 2016 to 2019.

== FirstEnergy scandal ==
As a member of the Ohio Senate, Theresa Gavarone co-sponsored House Bill 6 (HB 6), the 2019 energy law later tied to what prosecutors described as the largest corruption scandal in Ohio history. The $60 million bribery and racketeering scheme, centered on former House Speaker Larry Householder, was funded by FirstEnergy Corporation. See Ohio nuclear bribery scandal.

According to campaign finance records, Gavarone received $1,500 from the FirstEnergy political action committee in 2018, $1,000 in May 2019, and $3,500 in 2020, during the period surrounding the introduction and passage of HB 6.

HB 6 authorized a $1.3 billion ratepayer-funded bailout for two nuclear plants formerly owned by a FirstEnergy subsidiary.

Gavarone was not charged in the federal bribery case. However, her co-sponsorship of HB 6 and campaign contributions from FirstEnergy drew criticism from watchdog organizations, which highlighted the utility’s extensive influence over Ohio lawmakers.

== Early life and career ==
Gavarone was born in Dayton, Ohio, and attended Archbishop Alter High School in neighboring Kettering. She earned a Bachelor of Science degree in business administration from Bowling Green State University and a Juris Doctor from the University of Toledo College of Law, graduating in 1994. Soon after, she began practicing law in Bowling Green.

Along with her husband, Jim, Gavarone owns and operates Mr. Spots Philadelphia Steak Sandwich in Bowling Green along with practicing law. Gavarone was elected to two full terms on the Bowling Green City Council, winning in 2013 and again in 2015.

== Political career ==
=== Ohio House of Representatives ===
In 2016, Tim Brown decided to step down from the Ohio House to take a position with the Toledo Metropolitan Area Council of Governments, allowing Speaker Cliff Rosenberger and the House Republican Caucus to select his successor. After vetting, Gavarone was chosen to complete the remainder of Brown's term and to take his place on the ballot for a full term beginning in 2017. She was seated in the House on August 2, 2016, and won elections for full terms in 2016 and again in 2018.

Gavarone was vice chair of the House Health Committee.

=== Ohio Senate ===
In 2019, Randy Gardner was appointed by Governor Mike DeWine as chancellor of the Ohio Department of Higher Education. He resigned from the Senate in January. Gavarone immediately announced her intention to seek an appointment to the seat. On February 6, after unanimous approval by the Senate Republican Caucus, Gavarone was officially sworn in as a member of the Senate.

At the beginning of the 133rd General Assembly, Gavarone became vice chair of the Senate Higher Education Committee.

In June 2019, Gavarone sponsored legislation that would ban synthetic urine. In 2021, after Democratic candidates had won several races for the Supreme Court of Ohio in a row, Gavarone proposed a bill that would list the party affiliation of state supreme court judicial candidates on ballots.

==== Committee assignments ====
During the 134th General Assembly, Gavarone was assigned to the following Ohio Senate committees:

- (Chair of) Local Government and Elections Committee
- (Vice Chair of) Finance Committee
- Judiciary Committee
- Small Business & Economic Opportunity Committee
- Rules & Reference Committee

Additionally, Gavarone had the following special appointments:

- (Chair of) Joint Committee on Agency Rule Review
- (Vice Chair of) Ohio Ballot Board
- Joint Legislative Committee on Adoption Promotion and Support
- Ohio Child Support Guideline Advisory Council
- Great Lakes Commission
- National Council of State Legislatures Redistricting & Election Committee

=== 2022 congressional election ===
Gavarone was a Republican candidate for Ohio's 9th congressional district in the 2022 election. She placed third in the May 3, 2022, Ohio primary, losing to J.R. Majewski, a nuclear power plant employee who came to prominence after painting a Trump sign on his lawn.

== Personal life ==
Gavarone and her husband have three children. Her full name is Theresa Charters Gavarone. For 2023-2025 she voted absentee.

== Electoral history ==
Election results
Year	Office	Election	Subject	Party	Votes	%	Opponent	Party	Votes	%				
2016	Ohio House of Representatives	General	Theresa Gavarone	Republican	35,025	59.05%	Kelly Wicks	Democratic	24,289	40.95%				
2018	Ohio House of Representatives	General	Theresa Gavarone	Republican	29759	62.2%	Aidan Hubbell-Staeble	Democratic	18058	37.8%				
2020	Ohio Senate	General	Theresa Gavarone	Republican	122,084	62.2%%	Joel O'Dorisio	Democratic	74,240	37.8%				
2022	Ohio's 9th congressional district	Primary	J.R. Majewski	Republican	21,666	35.7%	Craig Riedel	Republican	18,861	31.0%	Theresa Gavarone	Republican	17,337	28.5%

Ohio Senate
Preceded by Rob McColley	Majority Leader of the Ohio Senate; 2025–present	Incumbent
