= Bruce Goodwin =

American politician (1949–2020)

Member of the Ohio House of Representatives from the 74th district
- In office January 2, 2007-December 31, 2012
- Preceded by: Steve Buehrer
- Succeeded by: Tony Burkley

Personal details
- Born: September 8, 1949 Defiance, Ohio
- Died: September 14, 2020 (aged 71) Defiance, Ohio
- Party: Republican
- Education: Defiance College; St. Francis College; University of Toledo; Bowling Green State University
- Occupation: Legislator

Bruce W. Goodwin (September 8, 1949 – September 14, 2020) was an American politician, serving as a state representative in the Ohio House of Representatives. He was a former educator.

== Personal life ==
Goodwin was married and has two children. Goodwin died on September 14, 2020, from cancer.

== Education ==
Goodwin went to Ayersville High School prior to attending Defiance College. He received a master's degree at St. Francis College and continued his education at the University of Toledo and Bowling Green State University.

== Career ==
Goodwin worked as a teacher and in school administration prior to his government service. In addition, he worked as director of the Four County Career Center, chairman of the State Legislative Committee for the Ohio Career and Technical Association, and chairman of the State Board of Directors for Trade and Industry.

== Government Service ==
Goodwin serves in the 74th district of the Ohio State House of Representatives representing Fulton, Williams, and Defiance counties.
