= Craig Riedel =

American politician (born 1966)

Member-elect of the Ohio Senate from the 1st district
- Assuming office January 4, 2027
- Succeeding: Rob McColley

Member of the Ohio House of Representatives from the 82nd district
- In office January 3, 2017 – December 31, 2022
- Preceded by: Tony Burkley
- Succeeded by: Roy Klopfenstein

Personal details
- Born: Craig Steven Riedel; May 23, 1966 (age 60) Oberlin, Ohio, U.S.
- Party: Republican
- Education: Ohio State University (BS)

Craig Riedel (born May 23, 1966) is an American politician who is the member-elect of the Ohio Senate from the 1st district. A member of the Republican Party , he previously served as the state representative for the 82nd District of the Ohio House of Representatives from 2017 to 2022, which consists of Defiance, Paulding and Van Wert counties as well as a portion of Auglaize County. Riedel was a candidate in the 2024 election for Ohio's 9th congressional district.

== Life and career ==
Riedel was born in Oberlin, Ohio, and raised in Attica, Ohio, on a family farm. He graduated from Seneca East High School, where he lettered in basketball. He then attended Ohio State University where he received a degree in civil engineering. He worked as an engineer for over twenty five years with Nucor Vulcraft Group, located in Defiance.

In 2015, Riedel retired, but continued to remain active in his community prior to being elected to public office. He is married with a son and a daughter and resides in Defiance, Ohio.

== Ohio House of Representatives ==
In 2016, incumbent Republican state representative Tony Burkley was up for a third term, however Riedel decided to run against him for the Republican nomination. In the campaign, Riedel defeated Burkley, 53% to 47%, winning three of the four counties in the district. Burkley was the only incumbent to lose that year.

Riedel was unopposed in the general election, and was sworn into office on January 3, 2017.

== Congressional campaigns ==
In 2022, Riedel ran for Ohio's 9th congressional district, but lost the Republican primary election to J.R. Majewski. Riedel made a second run for the seat in 2024, again facing Majewski in the primary. He earned the support of Republican congressional leaders, who hope Riedel would be a more viable candidate in a general election than Majewski, who lost in 2022 after lying about his military service. In December 2023, Trumpist activist Charlie Kirk released an audio recording of Riedel calling former President Donald Trump "arrogant," and further stating he wouldn't endorse Trump's 2024 presidential campaign. Seeking to prevent further backlash from the pro-Trump wing of the Republican Party, Riedel hurriedly endorsed Trump. Nevertheless, Congressmen Max Miller and Elise Stefanik, both Trump allies, rescinded their endorsements of Riedel. Reidel lost the primary to state representative Derek Merrin, who had hurriedly entered the race at the behest of Republican leaders searching for another alternative to Reidel or Majewski.
