= Ohio's 1st senatorial district =

American legislative district

Ohio's 1st State Senate district
Senator
Rob McColley; R–Napoleon
- Demographics: 88.8% White; 2% Black; 6.1% Hispanic; 1.1% Asian; 1.9% Native American; 0.1% Hawaiian/Pacific Islander
- Population (2020) • Voting age • Citizens of voting age: 350,009; 269,352; 264,717

The 1st Ohio senatorial district covers the north-western counties of Ohio, including Williams, Fulton, Defiance, Henry, Paulding, Van Wert, Putnam, Hancock, Hardin Counties and the northern section of Logan County. It is made up of House Districts 81,82, and 83. The current Ohio Senator is Republican Rob McColley and will be succeeded by member-elect Craig Riedel in January 2027.

== 2026 election results ==
Craig Riedel (R) 104,450 100%

== Historically ==
Before the 2023 redistricting, the 1st Ohio senatorial district represented areas located in northwestern Ohio. A multi-county district, it comprised the counties Hancock, Hardin, Putnam, Henry, Williams, Defiance, Paulding, and Van Wert and portions of the counties Fulton, Logan, and Auglaize. It encompassed Ohio House districts 81, 82 and 83. It has a Cook PVI of R+25.

== List of senators ==
Senator	Party	Term	Notes
Howard C. Cook	Republican	January 3, 1967 – December 31, 1974	Cook defeated in 1974 Republican Primary Election
M. Ben Gaeth	Republican	January 4, 1975 – December 31, 1998	Gaeth was not a candidate for re-election in 1998
Lynn Wachtmann	Republican	January 5, 1999 – December 31, 2006	Reached term limit after four terms
Steve Buehrer	Republican	January 2, 2007 – January 15, 2011	Resigned to become administrator of Ohio Bureau of Workers' Compensation
Cliff Hite	Republican	February 2, 2011 – October 17, 2017	Resigned
Rob McColley	Republican	December 5, 2017 – present	Incumbent
