= Howard C. Cook =

American politician (1918–1983)

Member of the Ohio Senate from the 1st district
- In office January 3, 1967 – December 31, 1974
- Preceded by: Inaugural holder
- Succeeded by: M. Ben Gaeth

Personal details
- Born: February 20, 1918
- Died: December 31, 1983 (aged 65) Toledo, Ohio
- Party: Republican

Howard C. Cook (February 20, 1918 – December 31, 1983) was an Ohio Republican Party politician and a former member of the Ohio General Assembly. Cook's political career began as a member of the Toledo, Ohio civil service commission. He was elected to Toledo City Council in 1951, serving off and on for the next decade. In 1960, Cook unsuccessfully ran for Congress against Thomas L. Ashley, and returned to city council following his defeat.

In 1966, Cook won a seat in the Ohio Senate, serving the 1st District. He was reelected handily in 1970, but in 1971, Cook ran unsuccessfully for Mayor of Toledo. Up for a third term in the Senate in 1974, Cook was opposed for the nomination by M. Ben Gaeth, who ultimately denied Cook a third term by defeating him in the primary election.

Following his tenure as an elected official, Cook remained active in the Toledo community. He died in 1983.
