= M. Ben Gaeth =

American politician

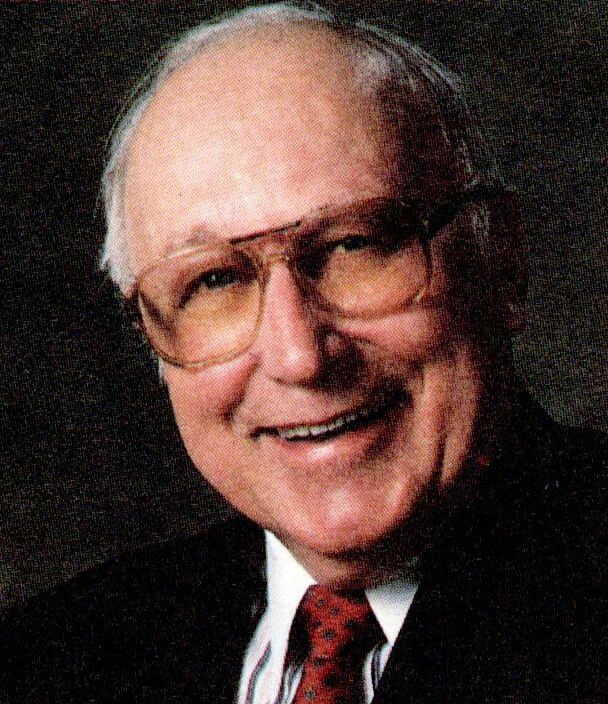

Member of the Ohio Senate from the 1st district
- In office January 3, 1975 – December 31, 1998
- Preceded by: Howard C. Cook
- Succeeded by: Lynn Wachtmann

Personal details
- Born: June 1, 1921 Oak Harbor, Ohio, U.S.
- Died: June 2, 2002 (aged 81) Lima, Ohio, U.S.
- Party: Republican

Matthew Ben Gaeth (June 1, 1921 – June 2, 2002) was a member of the Ohio Senate from 1975 to 1998, representing the 1st District. Born in Oak Harbor, Ohio, and raised on a farm there, was the youngest of 13 children. After graduating from Bowling Green State University in 1943 with a bachelor's degree in business administration, Gaeth enlisted in the US Navy serving in both the Atlantic and Pacific during World War II and received the Purple Heart.

Gaeth entered public service in 1962 as Defiance's part-time safety director, at the request of then-Mayor Robert Galliers. Three years later, when Mr. Galliers decided not to seek re-election, local Republicans asked Mr. Gaeth to run for mayor. Gaeth's first state Senate campaign began at the request of Mr. Cook, his predecessor who in 1974 declared his candidacy for lieutenant governor. But when Mr. Cook decided to abandon that pursuit, Mr. Brennan said, Mr. Gaeth refused to withdraw and defeated Mr. Cook in a primary battle. Holding office in the era before term limits, he was re-elected five times before retiring in 1998. He rose to the chairmanship of the agriculture, commerce, and labor committee and vice-chairmanship of the highways, transportation, and local government committee.

After retiring from the Senate, Gaeth returned to Lima, Ohio for retirement. He died in 2002.
