= 2007 Ohio's 5th congressional district special election =

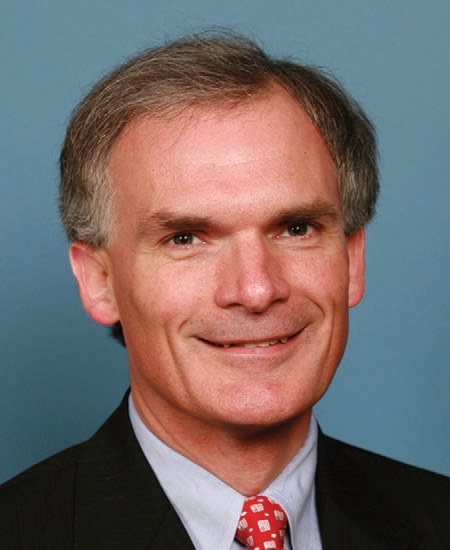

Nominee	Bob Latta	Robin Weirauch
Party	Republican	Democratic
Popular vote	56,114	42,229
Percentage	56.96%	42.87%
- County results Latta: 50–60% 60–70% 70–80%
U.S. Representative before election
Paul Gillmor
Republican
Elected U.S. Representative
Bob Latta
Republican

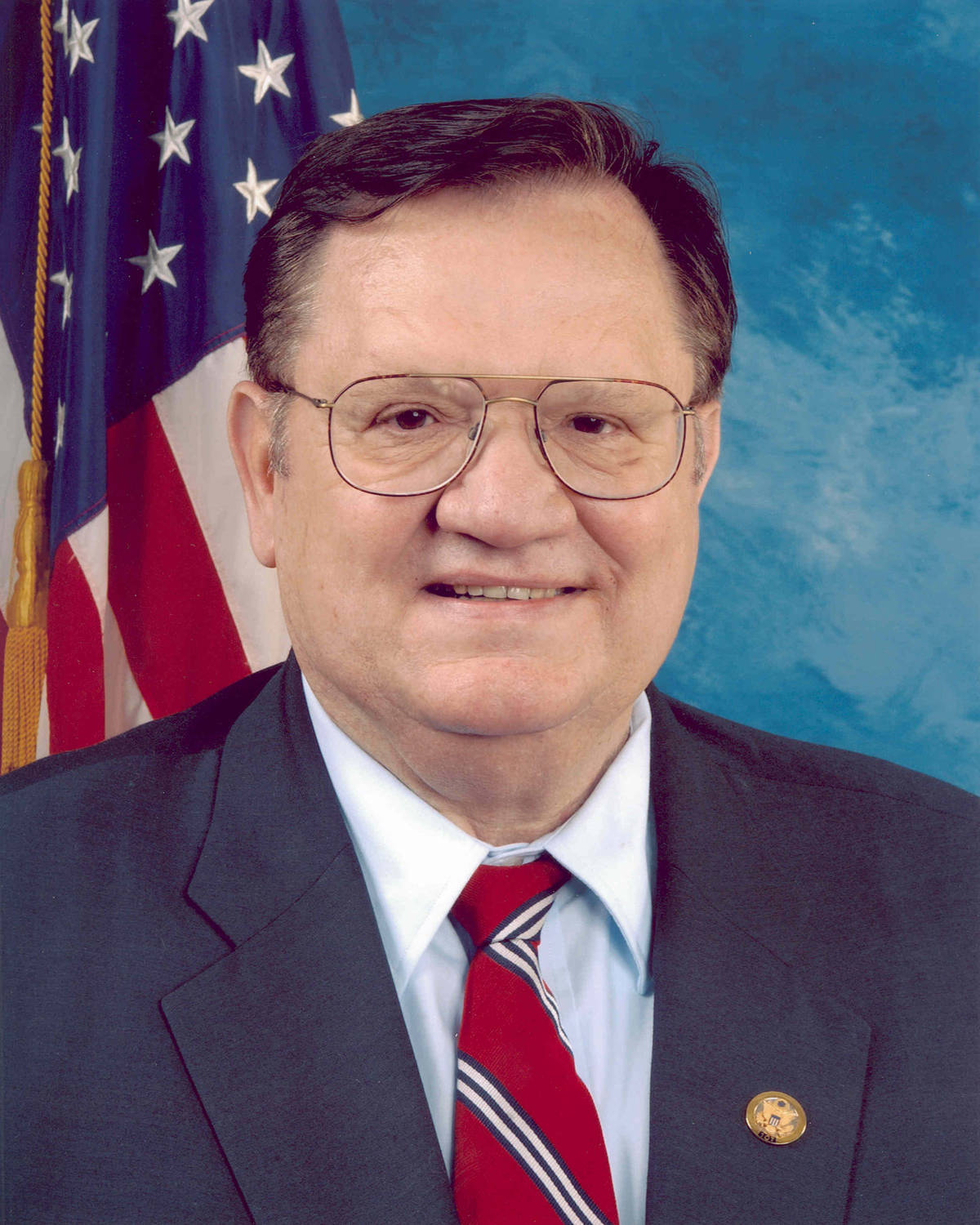
Paul Gillmor, whose death triggered a special election in Ohio's 5th congressional district

The 2007 special election in Ohio's 5th congressional district occurred when the district became vacant following the death of incumbent Paul E. Gillmor. A special election to fill the seat was called by Ohio Governor Ted Strickland for December 11, 2007. Republican nominee and Ohio State Senator Bob Latta won election to Congress, defeating Democratic nominee Robin Weirauch.

== Democratic primary ==
=== Candidates ===
- Robin Weirauch, public administrator, 2004 and 2006 Democratic nominee
- George Mays, businessman

=== Results ===
Democratic primary results
Party	Candidate	Votes	%
Democratic	Robin Weirauch	32,124	72.13
Democratic	George Mays	12,412	27.87
Total votes		44,536	100.00

== Republican primary ==
=== Candidates ===
- Bob Latta, State Senator
- Steve Buehrer, State Senator
- Mark Hollenbaugh, high school teacher
- Fred Pieper
- Michael Smitley, business consultant

=== Polling ===
Source	Date	Buehrer (R)	Hollenbaugh (R)	Latta (R)	Pieper (R)	Smitley (R)
Basswood Research	Oct 27–28, 2007	28%	N/A	25%	N/A	N/A
Public Opinion Strategies	Oct 16–17, 2007	21%	1%	40%	4%	0%
Basswood Research	October 15, 2007	25%	N/A	28%	N/A	N/A
Basswood Research	September 19, 2007	14%	N/A	27%	N/A	N/A

=== Results ===
Republican primary results
Party	Candidate	Votes	%
Republican	Bob Latta	32,392	43.66
Republican	Steve Buehrer	29,850	40.23
Republican	Mark Hollenbaugh	4,955	6.68
Republican	Fred Pieper	4,252	5.73
Republican	Michael Smitley	2,742	3.70
Total votes		74,191	100.00

== General election ==
=== Polling ===
Source	Date	Latta (R)	Weirauch (D)
Public Opinion Strategies	Nov 11–12, 2007	50%	36%

=== Results ===
Ohio's 5th congressional district special election, 2007
Party	Candidate	Votes	%
Republican	Bob Latta	56,114	56.96
Democratic	Robin Weirauch	42,229	42.87
Write-ins		167	0.17
Total votes		98,510	100.00
Republican hold			

== See also ==
- List of special elections to the United States House of Representatives
