= BG News =

Student newspaper at Bowling Green State University

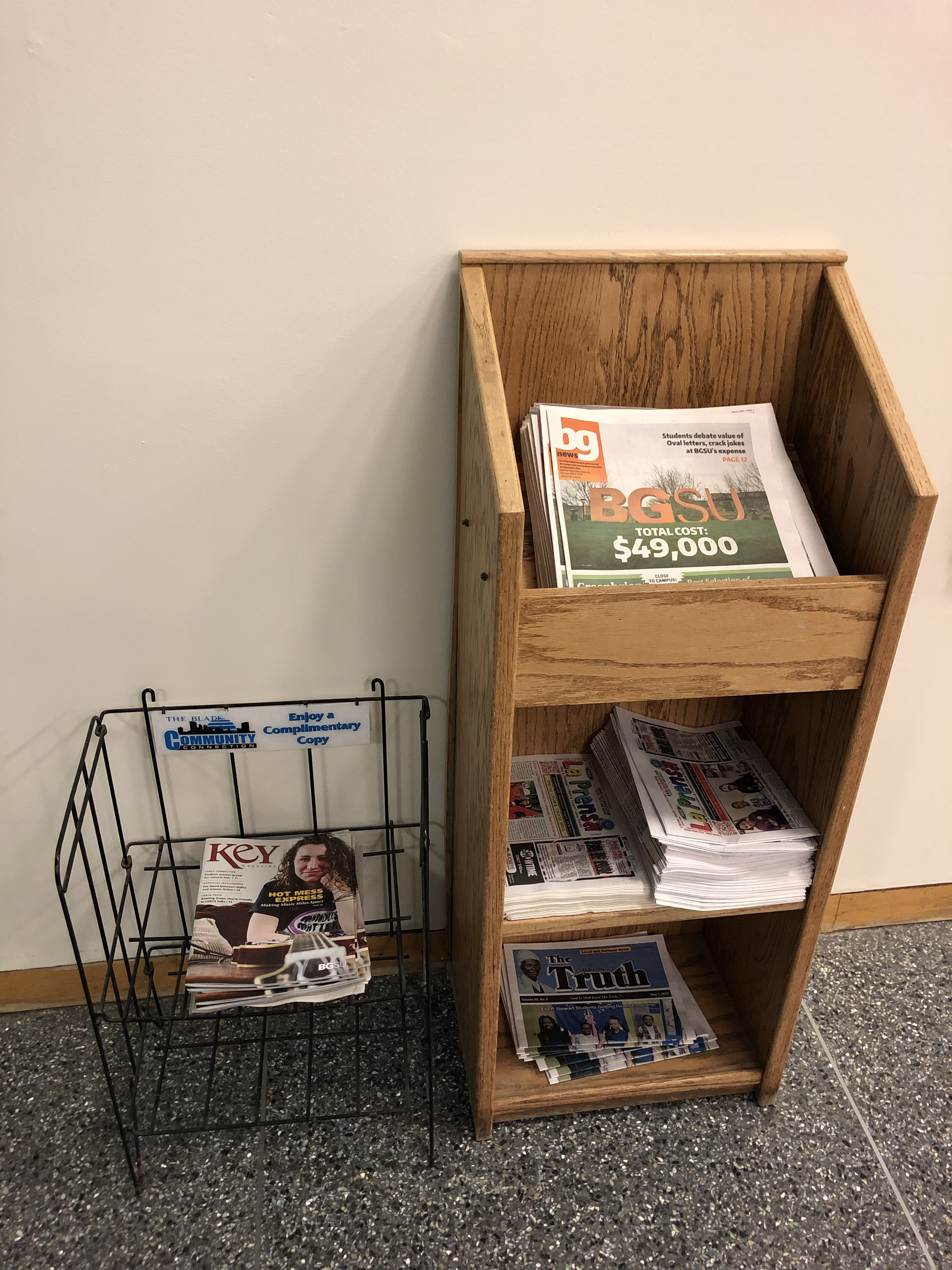
A copy of the BG News on a news stand.

Founded in 1920, the BG News is the student-run newspaper at Bowling Green State University, which is published Monday through Friday during the fall and spring semesters and weekly during the summer. It can be picked up at hundreds of locations on and off campus around Bowling Green, Ohio. The newspaper offices are located at The Michael & Sara Kuhlin Center and is advised by the Director of Student Publications. Past editors include: Maxwell Selby in 2013, Danae King in 2014, Cameron T. Robinson in 2015, Annie Furia in 2016 and Holly Shively in 2017.

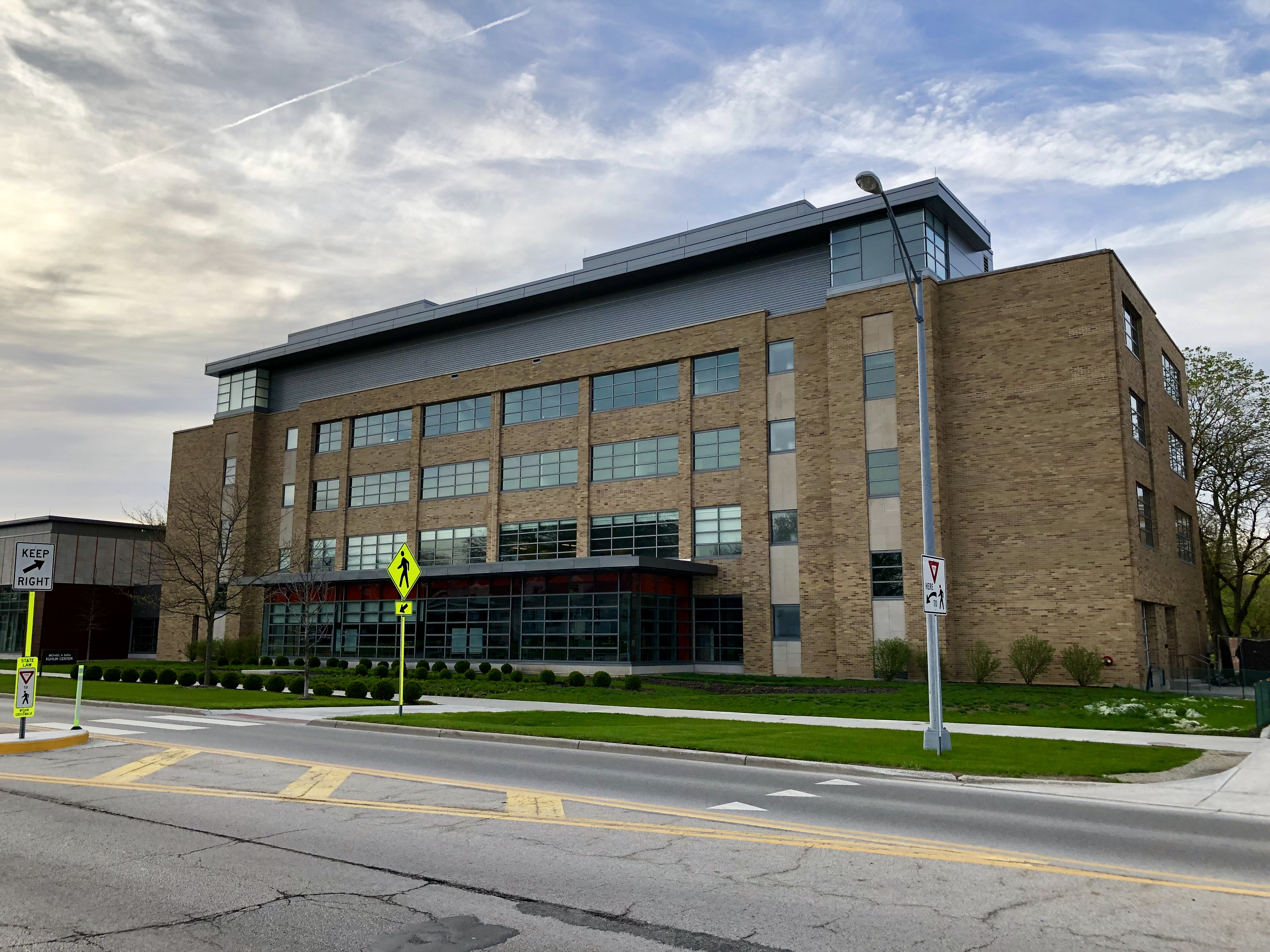
The Kuhlin Center where the news offices are currently located.

== Sections ==
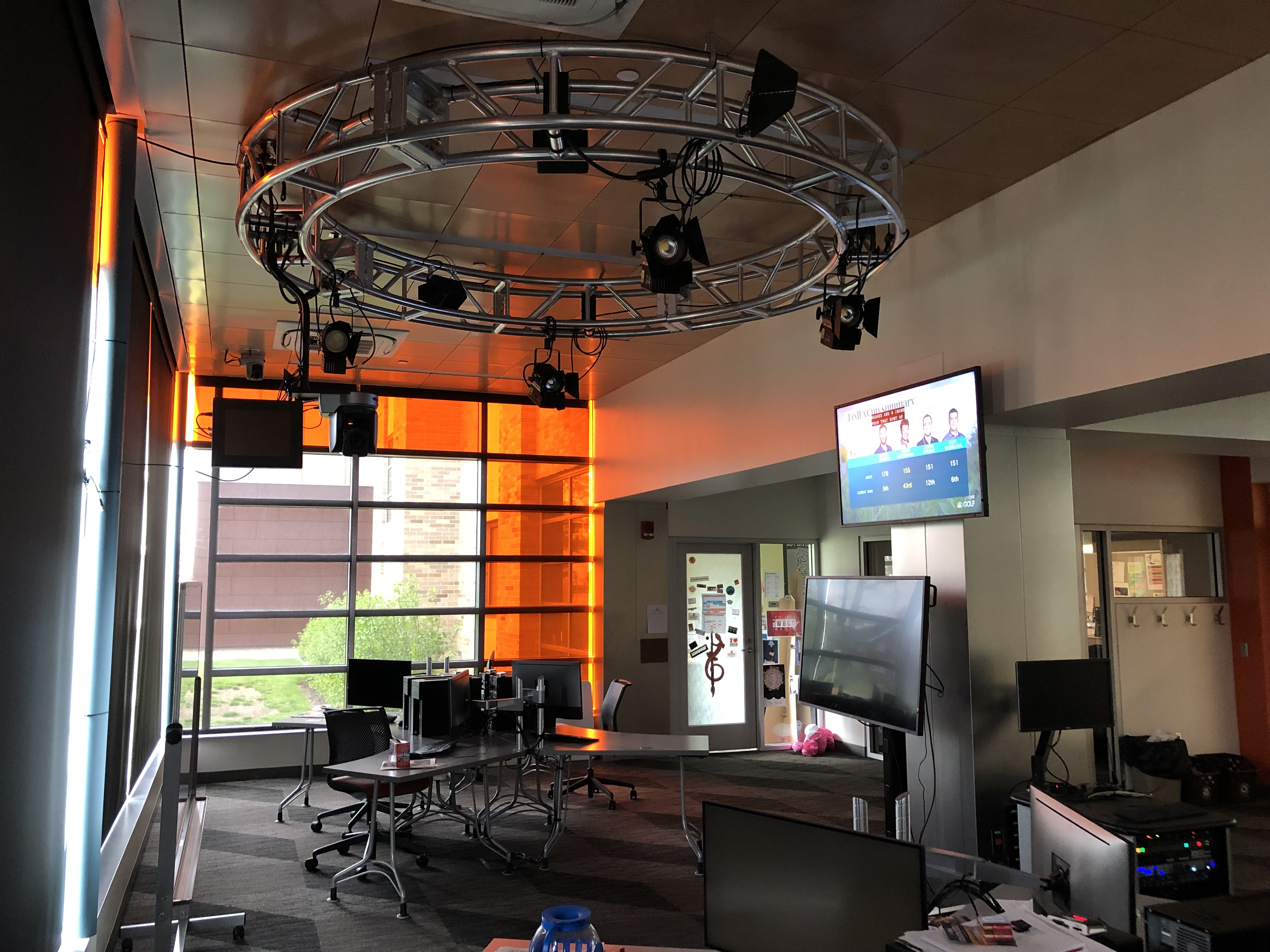
The BG Falcon Media newsroom.

=== News ===
The BG News offers local campus and city news, as well as state, regional, national, and international news stories, and editorials.

=== Sports ===
Sports appears in every issue and provides the latest scores and sports related news stories. The paper is also the only newspaper source for several campus sports such as football, men's and women's basketball, hockey, baseball, soccer, and other various sports on BGSU's campus. Also covered in the sports section are other NCAA games as well as regional professional sports.

=== The Pulse ===
The Pulse is an entertainment section that comes out once a week on Tuesdays during the academic year.

=== The Blotter ===
The Blotter, a daily review of the strangest calls that the Bowling Green City Police and Bowling Green State University Police received the past night, and the entire weekend in Monday editions. Typical blotter reports range from underage alcohol consumption and pranks to more serious crimes such burglary and vandalism.

=== Forum ===
Forum is the opinion section of the paper with articles from BG News columnists and guest columnist submissions. The Forum section also includes political cartoons and an opinion poll question and answer in a section called "People On The Street."

=== Other features ===
BG News also includes classified ads, a crossword puzzle, and sudoku in each issue. The BG News also operates a website called the "BG News Network" and features forums, links to local Bowling Green, OH properties, and classified ads.
