= Bruce Billings (cartoonist) =

American cartoonist

- Born: Bruce Billings
- Area: Cartoonist
- Notable works: Castro

Cover of Between the Sheets/Under the Covers by Bruce Billings and Kurt Erichsen

Bruce Billings is an openly gay cartoonist, creator of the LGBT-themed comic strip Castro, which ran in the 1970s and 1980s in San Francisco gay newspapers such as The Voice. Castro nominally starred a dog (based on Billings') who lived in the Castro Street neighborhood of San Francisco with his owner (based on Billings himself), and the strip affectionately lampooned the gay male culture of the city. The strips were reprinted in Gay Comix, Meatmen, and Strip AIDS USA. In 1989, Billings and cartoonist Kurt Erichsen co-produced a flip book – a single bound volume with both covers formatted as the "front" – as Between the Sheets! (Billings' cover) and Under the Covers (Erichsen's). Billings retired to southern Oregon.
