= Barbara Sears =

American politician

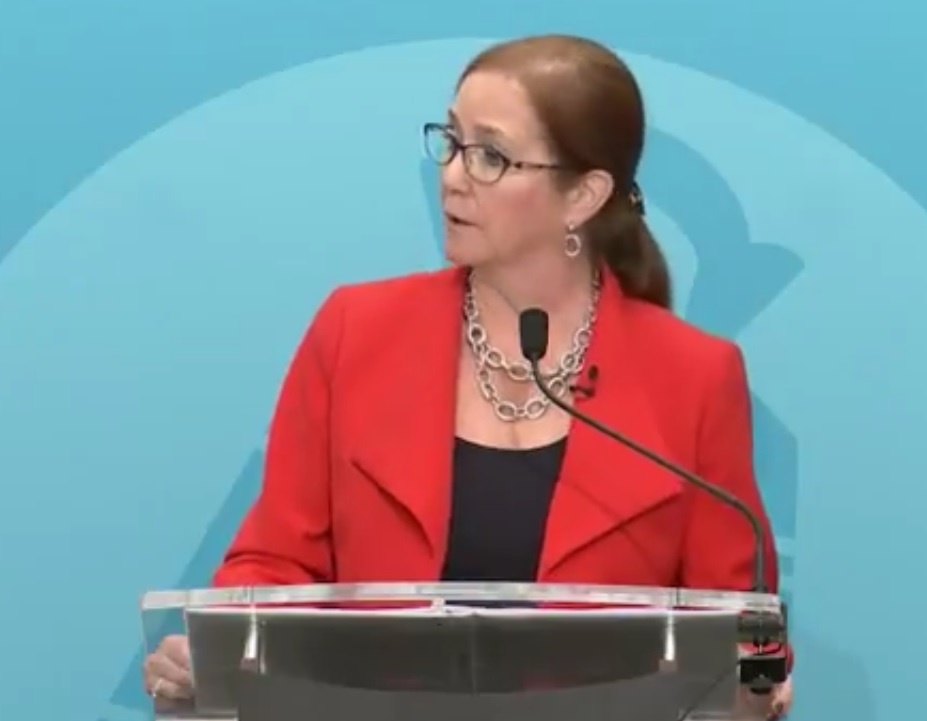

Member of the Ohio House of Representatives from the 47th district
- In office January 15, 2008 – June 29, 2016
- Preceded by: Mark Wagoner
- Succeeded by: Derek Merrin

Personal details
- Born: April 29, 1961 (age 65) Youngstown, Ohio, U.S.
- Party: Republican
- Education: University of Toledo
- Occupation: Legislator

Barbara R. Sears (born December 5, 1966) is a Republican politician who formerly represented the 47th District of the Ohio House of Representatives from 2008 to 2016. She served as the Majority Floor Leader in the Ohio House of Representatives. Her district included much of suburban Toledo, Ohio.

== Life and career ==
Sears graduated from the University of Toledo in 1983. She served on the city council of Sylvania, Ohio from 1998 to 2008, serving as president of the council from 2004 to 2008. She is a co-owner of Noble and Sears, Inc.

Currently, she lives in Monclova Township, Ohio. She has two sons.

== Ohio House of Representatives ==
In 2008, Sears was appointed to the Ohio House to succeed Mark Wagoner, who had resigned to serve in the Ohio Senate. She won reelection in 2008 and 2010.

In 2012, Sears won election to a third term, defeating Democrat Jeff Bunck with 60.18% of the vote. Sears came under fire from ultra-conservatives in 2014 for her outspoken support for Medicaid expansion, which many saw as a facet of Obamacare. Regardless, she easily won a primary for her seat to take another term in 2014.

Sears won a final term in 2014 unopposed and served as House Majority Leader for half of the 131st Ohio General Assembly. She resigned prior to the expiration of her term in 2016 to the assistant director of the Governor's Office of Health Transformation for Ohio Governor John Kasich. On December 23, 2016, she was sworn in as Ohio's new Medicaid director.
