= Randy Gardner (politician) =

American politician

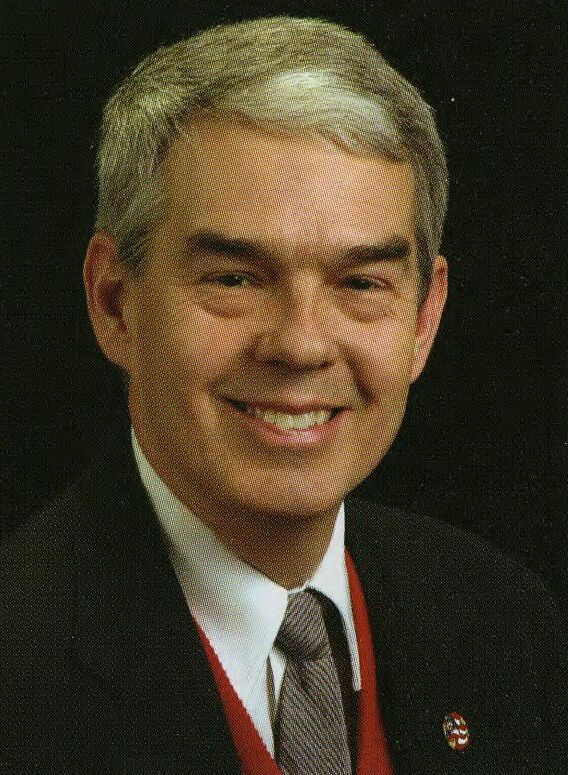

Chancellor of the Ohio Department of Higher Education
- In office 2018 – 2024
- Governor: Mike DeWine
- Preceded by: John Carey
- Succeeded by: Mike Duffey

Majority Leader of the Ohio Senate
- In office January 3, 2017 – February 6, 2019
- Preceded by: Tom Patton
- Succeeded by: Matt Huffman

Member of the Ohio Senate from the 2nd district
- In office January 1, 2013 – February 6, 2019
- Preceded by: Mark Wagoner
- Succeeded by: Theresa Gavarone
- In office January 1, 2001 – January 9, 2008
- Preceded by: Bob Latta
- Succeeded by: Mark Wagoner

Member of the Ohio House of Representatives from the 6th district
- In office January 10, 2008 – December 31, 2012
- Preceded by: Bob Latta
- Succeeded by: Tim Brown
- In office December 5, 1985 – December 31, 2000
- Preceded by: Robert Brown
- Succeeded by: Bob Latta

Personal details
- Born: August 20, 1958 (age 67) Bowling Green, Ohio, U.S.
- Party: Republican
- Education: Bowling Green State University (BA, MA)

Randall L. Gardner (born 1958) is an American politician. A member of the Republican Party, he represented Ohio's 2nd senatorial district from 2001 to 2008, and again from 2013 to 2018. Gardner was also a member of the Ohio House of Representatives from 1985 to 2000, and from 2008 to 2012. Governor Mike DeWine appointed Gardner as the chancellor of the Ohio Department of Higher Education in 2019.

== Career ==
Gardner first entered Ohio politics in 1985, when he was appointed to a seat vacated by former State Representative, Robert Brown. He went on to serve 7 more full terms in the House, until the time being term limited in 2000.

With State Senator Bob Latta not running for reelection to his seat, Gardner decided to run in 2000. He did, and in 2001, took his seat in the upper chamber. He quickly rose in the ranks, and served as president pro-tempore for the 125th General Assembly. In 2004, he faced weak opposition, and once again won his senate bid. He served as majority leader for the 126th General Assembly and the 127th General Assembly.

With then-Senate President Doug White facing term limits, Gardner and Senator Jeff Jacobson were looked at as two potential successors. However, by the end of 2003, Gardner had withdrawn as a candidate, citing the desire to eliminate uncertainty in the caucus. Soon after, Jacobson in early 2004, became associated with a lobbying scandal, and Gardner once again emerged as a potential contender. In late summer 2004, he once again withdrew, and gave his support to Bill Harris, who went on to become president.

Gardner made it evident half way through 2007 that he intended to run for his old House seat in 2008, when he faced term limits in the Senate. However, when Congressman Paul Gillmor was found dead in his Washington D.C. area apartment, Gardner was mentioned as a potential successor, but on September 17, 2007, Gardner stated he was staying in the state legislature. When Bob Latta ended up winning the congressional race to succeed Gillmor, Latta's 6th District Ohio House seat became vacant. Gardner therefore resigned his Senate seat and was appointed early to the seat he was running for in the fall. He was subsequently placed as ranking member of the Higher Education Subcommittee of the Finance Committee.

In 2012, Mark Wagoner opted to not run again for the 2nd District, opening up the election. Gardner again opted to switch chambers, and ultimately won his former district with 58.66% of the vote over Democrat Jeff Bretz.

=== Committee assignments ===
- Finance: Education Sub.--Chair
- Education
- Rules & Reference
- Health & Human Services
- Energy and Natural Resources

== Electoral history ==
Election results
Year	Office	Election	Percentage for Gardner	Opponent	Party	%
1986	Ohio House of Representatives	General	61.5%	Joyce Kepke	Democrat	39.5%
1988	Ohio House of Representatives	General	70.5%	William Fischer	Democrat	29.5%
1990	Ohio House of Representatives	General	63.9%	Kathleen Steingraber	Democrat	36.1%
1992	Ohio House of Representatives	General	68.6%	John Sinn	Democrat	31.4%
1994	Ohio House of Representatives	General	75.58%	Bruce Purdy	Democrat	24.42%
1996	Ohio House of Representatives	General	65.93%	Antonio Yap	Democrat	34.07%
1998	Ohio House of Representatives	General	72.43%	Kurt Young	Democrat	27.57%
2000	Ohio Senate	General	100%	Unopposed		
2004	Ohio Senate	General	62.27%	Nathan Nickens	Democrat	37.73%
2008	Ohio House of Representatives	General	61.97%	Jeffery Bretz	Democrat	38.03%
2010	Ohio House of Representatives	General	66.61%	Jackie Brown	Democrat	33.39%
2012	Ohio Senate	General	58.66%	Jeffery Bretz	Democrat	41.34%
2016	Ohio Senate	General	66.6%	Kirk Halliday	Democrat	33.4%

Ohio Senate
Preceded by Tom Patton	Majority Leader of the Ohio Senate; 2017–2019	Succeeded by Matt Huffman
