= Bob Latta =

American politician (born 1956)

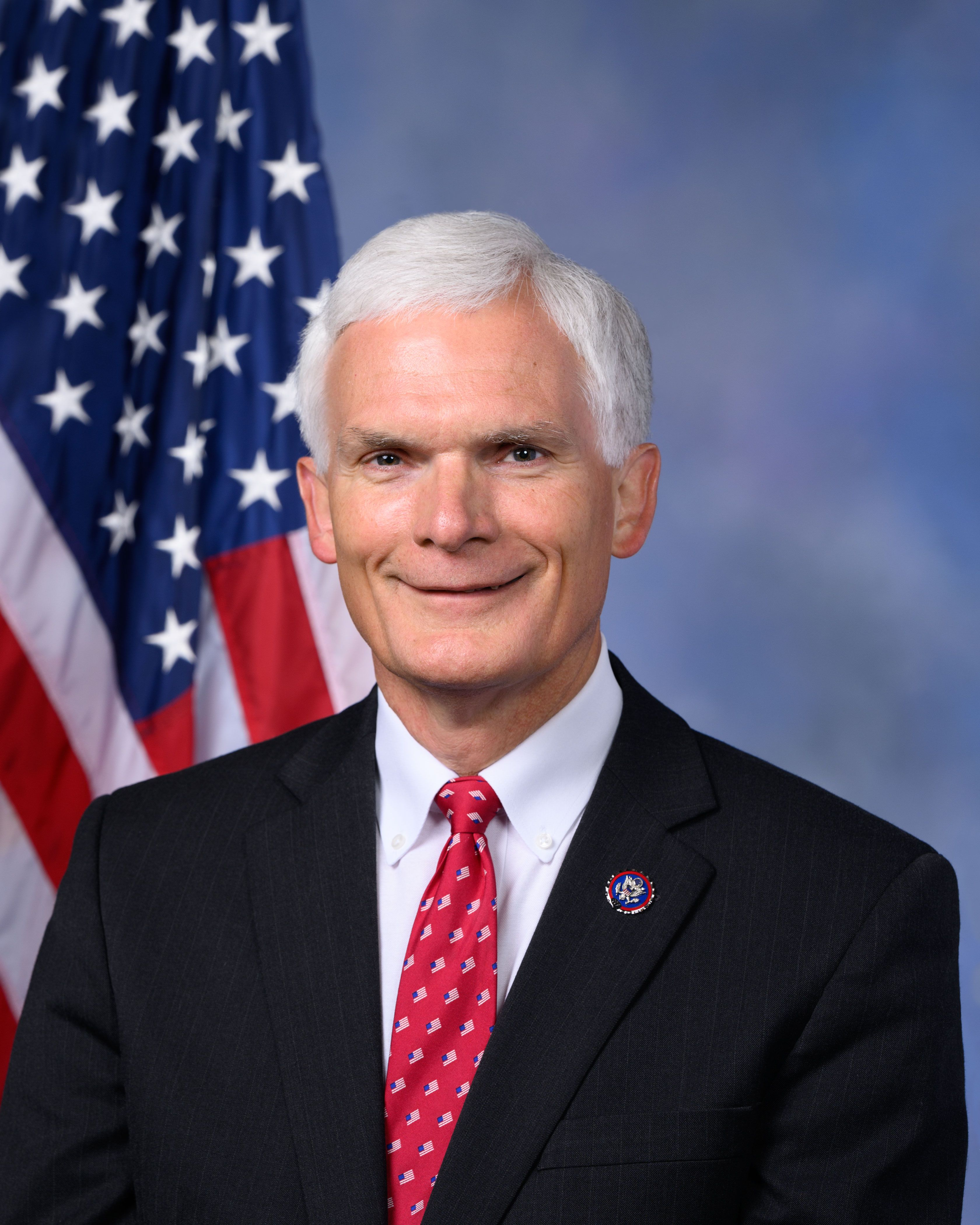
- Official portrait, 2024

Member of the U.S. House of Representatives from Ohio's 5th district
- Incumbent
- Assumed office December 11, 2007 (Note: Latta's official service begins on the date of the special election, while he was not sworn in until December 13, 2007.)
- Preceded by: Paul Gillmor

Member of the Ohio House of Representatives
- In office January 7, 2003 – December 13, 2007
- Preceded by: Tim Schaffer
- Succeeded by: Randy Gardner
- Constituency: 6th district
- In office January 2, 2001 – December 31, 2002
- Preceded by: Randy Gardner
- Succeeded by: John R. Willamowski
- Constituency: 4th district

Personal details
- Born: Robert Edward Latta; April 18, 1956 (age 70) Bluffton, Ohio, U.S.
- Party: Republican
- Spouse: Marcia Sloan (m. 1986)
- Children: 2
- Parent: Del Latta (father)
- Education: Bowling Green State University (BA); University of Toledo (JD)
- Website: House website Campaign website
- Latta's voice Latta on the 2019 tornadoes in Ohio. Recorded June 3, 2019

Robert Edward Latta (/ˈlætə/ LAT-ə; born April 18, 1956) is an American politician who is the United States representative for Ohio's 5th congressional district. Currently in his 10th term, Latta has served in Congress since 2007, and prior to that he served four terms in the Ohio House of Representatives. He is a member of the Republican Party. The fifth district includes many of Toledo's suburbs, as well as Findlay, Bowling Green, Tiffin, Napoleon, Sylvania, Defiance and Van Wert, and a sliver of Toledo itself.

== Early life, education and career ==
Born in Bluffton, Ohio, Latta earned his Bachelor of Arts at Bowling Green State University in 1978 and his Juris Doctor at the University of Toledo College of Law in 1981. Latta was inducted into Omicron Delta Kappa in 1995 as an alumnus of Bowling Green State University. His father, Del Latta, represented the 5th from 1959 to 1989 and served as ranking Republican on the House Budget Committee from 1975 to his retirement. Latta worked as a private practice attorney before entering politics.

== Ohio political career ==
Latta served as a Wood County Commissioner from 1991 to 1996. He then represented the 2nd Senate District in the Ohio Senate from 1997 to 2001 and the 6th house district in the Ohio House of Representatives from 2001 to 2007.

== U.S. House of Representatives ==
=== Elections ===
In 2018, the Conservative Review gave him a 58% rating. Americans for Prosperity has given him a lifetime rating of 90%. In 2017, the Campaign for Working Families gave him a rating of 100%. In 2017, the John Birch Society gave him a Freedom Index rating of 60%. The American Conservative Union has given him a lifetime rating of 91%.

=== Tenure ===
On July 22, 2014, Latta introduced a bill that would direct the Federal Communications Commission (FCC) to allow manufacturers of electronic devices with a screen to display information required by the agency digitally on the screen rather than on a label affixed to the device.

In 2015, Latta cosponsored a resolution to amend the Constitution to ban same-sex marriage.

In December 2020, Latta was one of 126 Republican members of the House of Representatives to sign an amicus brief in support of Texas v. Pennsylvania, a lawsuit filed at the United States Supreme Court contesting the results of the 2020 presidential election, in which Joe Biden defeated incumbent Donald Trump. The Supreme Court declined to hear the case on the basis that Texas lacked standing under Article III of the Constitution to challenge the results of an election held by another state.

On May 19, 2021, Latta voted against establishing an independent commission to investigate the storming of the U.S. Capitol. In 2021, he introduced legislation to prohibit municipalities from building their own broadband networks.

=== Committee assignments ===
- Committee on Energy and Commerce
  - Subcommittee on Communications and Technology
  - Subcommittee on Energy (chair)

=== Caucus memberships ===
- Republican Study Committee
- Congressional Propane Caucus (Co-chair)
- Congressional Sportsmen's Caucus (Co-chair)
- Congressional French Caucus (Co-chair)
- Congressional Rural Broadband Caucus (Co-chair)
- Congressional Natural Gas Caucus
- Congressional Constitution Caucus
- House Baltic Caucus
- Rare Disease Caucus
- Congressional Caucus on Turkey and Turkish Americans

== Personal life ==
Latta is Catholic. He is an avid sportsman and lifelong resident of Northwest Ohio. He and his wife, Marcia, live in Bowling Green and have two daughters. He is the son of former Congressman Del Latta and Rose Mary Kiene Latta and serves in the seat his father held in Congress from 1959 to 1989.

== Electoral history ==
=== 1988 ===
Latta ran in the Republican primary for the congressional seat that opened up in 1988 after his father Del announced his retirement. He lost by 27 votes to then Ohio State Senate president Paul Gillmor, who won the general election.

=== 2007 ===
After Gillmor's sudden death in September 2007, Latta ran again for the seat. He defeated State Senator Steve Buehrer, among other candidates, in the special primary. In the December 11 special general election, Latta defeated Democratic nominee Robin Weirauch, 57% to 43%. He was sworn in on December 13, 2007.

=== 2010 ===
Latta defeated Democratic nominee Caleb Finkenbiner and Libertarian nominee Brian L. Smith.

=== 2012 ===
Latta defeated Democratic nominee Angela Zimmann and Libertarian nominee Eric Eberly. He was endorsed by the United States Chamber of Commerce, the NFIB, the NRA Political Victory Fund and National Right to Life.

Election results
Year	Office	Election	Name	Party	Votes	%	Opponent	Party	Votes	%	Opponent	Party	Votes	%
1996	Ohio Senate	General	Bob Latta	Republican	77,796	54.8%	Chris Redfern	Democratic	64,279	45.2%				
2000	Ohio House of Representatives	General	Bob Latta	Republican	31,461	64.6%	Dean Clarke	Democratic	15,731	32.3%	Milton Mann	Libertarian	1,483	3.0%
2002	Ohio House of Representatives	General	Bob Latta	Republican	25,493	68.1%	Scott McCarty	Democratic	11,932	31.9%				
2004	Ohio House of Representatives	General	Bob Latta	Republican	36,625	62.5%	Scott McCarty	Democratic	21,971	37.5%				
2006	Ohio House of Representatives	General	Bob Latta	Republican	25,494	56.9%	Jeffrey Bretz	Democratic	19,346	43.1%				
2007	U.S. House of Representatives	Special General	Bob Latta	Republican	56,114	57.0%	Robin Weirauch	Democratic	42,229	42.9%	John Green	Write-in	167	0.17%
2008	U.S. House of Representatives	General	Bob Latta	Republican	188,905	64.1%	George Mays	Democratic	105,840	35.9%				
2010	U.S. House of Representatives	General	Bob Latta	Republican	140,703	67.8%	Caleb Finkenbiner	Democratic	54,919	26.5%	Brian Smith	Libertarian	11,831	5.7%
2012	U.S. House of Representatives	General	Bob Latta	Republican	201,514	57.3%	Angela Zimmann	Democratic	137,806	39.2%	Eric Eberly	Libertarian	12,558	3.6%
2014	U.S. House of Representatives	General	Bob Latta	Republican	134,449	66.5%	Robert Fry	Democratic	58,507	28.9%	Eric Eberly	Libertarian	9,344	4.6%
2016	U.S. House of Representatives	General	Bob Latta	Republican	244,599	70.9%	James Neu	Democratic	100,392	29.1%				
2018	U.S. House of Representatives	General	Bob Latta	Republican	173,894	62.46%	J. Michael Galbraith	Democratic	97,352	34.96%				
2020	U.S. House of Representatives	General	Bob Latta	Republican	257,019	68.0%	Nick Rubando	Democratic	120,962	32.0%				
2022	U.S. House of Representatives	General	Bob Latta	Republican	187,303	66.9%	Craig Swartz	Democratic	92,634	33.1%				
2024	U.S. House Of Representatives	General	Bob Latta	Republican	255,633	67.5%	Keith Mundy	Democratic	123,024	37.5%				

U.S. House of Representatives
Preceded by Omar Burleson	Member of the U.S. House of Representatives from Ohio's 5th congressional district 2007–present	Incumbent
U.S. order of precedence (ceremonial)
Preceded by Adrian Smith	United States representatives by seniority 62nd	Succeeded by Rob Wittman
