= Monclova Christian Academy =

- MCA
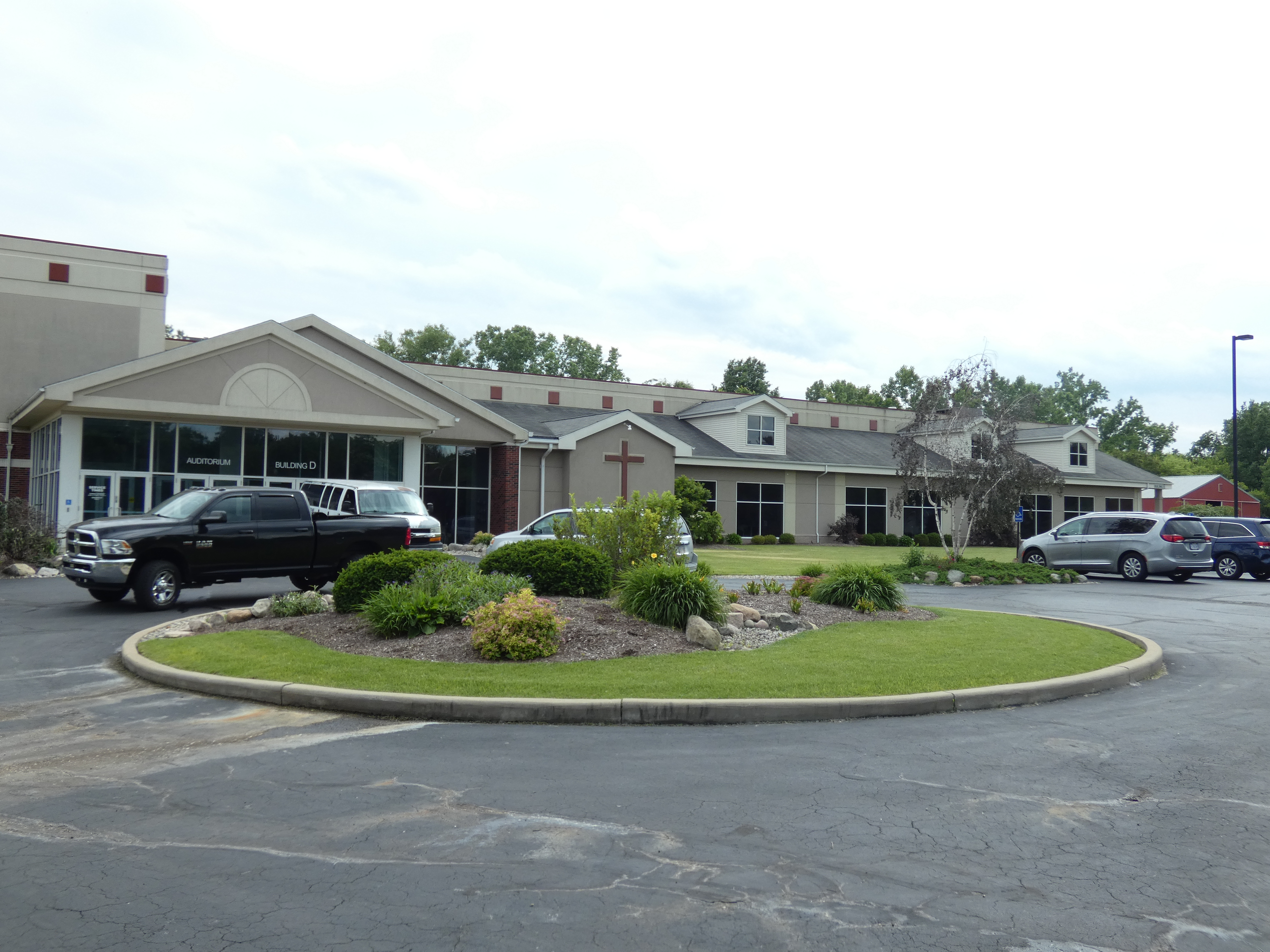
- Front portion of the main campus

Location
- 7819 Monclova Road; Monclova; Monclova, (Lucas County), Ohio 43542; United States
- Coordinates: 41°33′27″N 83°43′44″W

Information
- Opened: 1999
- Superintendent: Jose Salazar
- Principal: Mark Lenentine
- Colors: Red, White, and Blue
- Nickname: MCA
- Team name: Thunder
- Website: http://monclovabaptist.org/mca/

Monclova Christian Academy is a private Christian school in Monclova, Ohio, United States, southwest of Toledo. It is a ministry of Monclova Road Baptist Church.

Monclova Christian Academy was founded in 1999.

In 2008, a preschool class was added to the academy.
