= Charlie Earl =

American politician

Member of the Ohio House of Representatives from the 80th district
- In office October 7, 1981 – December 31, 1984
- Preceded by: Mike Oxley
- Succeeded by: Lynn Wachtmann

Personal details
- Born: June 6, 1946 (age 80) Fostoria, Ohio
- Party: Libertarian (2010–present)
- Other political affiliations: Republican (before 2010)
- Spouse: Pat
- Children: 2
- Education: College of Wooster (B.A.); Bowling Green State University (M.A.)
- Profession: Radio broadcasting Mass communication professor
- Website: Campaign website

Charles R. Earl (born June 6, 1946) is an American politician and former member of the Ohio House of Representatives 80th district from 1981 to 1984 when he declined to seek reelection. A member of the Libertarian Party, he received enough signatures to obtain ballot access and become a candidate for Governor of Ohio in the 2014 election.

== Early life, education, and family ==
Earl was born in Fostoria, Ohio, a town near Findlay. Charlie attended public schools in Sycamore, Ohio and then enrolled at College of Wooster graduating in 1975 with a Bachelor of Arts in English. Later, Earl enrolled at Bowling Green State University graduating in 1992 with a Master of Arts in mass communication but stayed for two more years pursuing doctoral studies.

== Ohio House of Representatives (1981–1984) ==
With Mike Oxley elected to Congress in a special election following the death of Congressman Tennyson Guyer, Earl was appointed to serve the remainder of Oxley's term in the Ohio House of Representatives. In 1982, Earl won election to a full term. In 1984, Earl opted not to run for another term, and was succeeded by Lynn Wachtmann. He subsequently returned to the private sector.

== 2010 Ohio Secretary of State election ==
In 2010, Earl decided to run for office, this time as a Libertarian. While initially looking to obtain his seat back in the Ohio House of Representatives, he decided to instead run for Ohio Secretary of State. He lost the election, and has since again returned to private life.

== 2014 gubernatorial election ==
Earl has announced his candidacy for Governor of Ohio. Earl has achieved enough valid signatures to obtain ballot access in the election. However, he was barred from the ballot because of technical faults in the signatures collected. The decision was appealed in federal court but the court determined the signatures were not collected by Libertarian Party or independent petitioners as required by law.

== Electoral history ==
Election results
Year	Office	Election	Subject	Party	Votes	%	Opponent	Party	Votes	%	Opponent	Party	Votes	%
2010	Ohio Secretary of State	General	Charlie Earl	Libertarian	179,495	4.9%	Jon Husted	Republican	1,973,422	54.0%	Maryellen O'Shaughnessy	Democratic	1,500,648	41.1%
