= Roy Klopfenstein =

American politician (born 1960)

Member of the Ohio House of Representatives from the 82nd district
- Incumbent
- Assumed office January 1, 2023

Personal details
- Born: November 20, 1960 (age 65) Haviland, Ohio, U.S.
- Party: Republican
- Spouse: Deborah Klopfenstein

Roy W. Klopfenstein is an American politician who is serving as the state representative for the 82nd District of the Ohio House of Representatives since 2023. The 82nd District consists of counties of Paulding, Putnam, Van Wert, and a portion of Defiance. Klopfenstein is running for reelection in 2024.

== Biography ==
Klopfenstein was born and raised in Haviland, Ohio. He graduated from Wayne Trace High School; He then attended Purdue University, where he got a degree in agriculture. He is a self-employed farmer since 1983.

Klopfenstein is a former state committee member of the USDA Farm Service Agency, and is currently a member of the Ohio Soybean Association, Ohio Corn & Wheat Growers Association and Ohio Farm Bureau. He was also a former chairman of the Pauling County Extension Advisory Committee and The Ohio State University State Extension Advisory Committee.

In 1982, Roy married Deborah, and they have four sons.

== Ohio House of Representatives ==
In 2022, Klopfenstein ran for the 82nd District, and won the primaries against Ted Penner, with 4,745 votes against Penner's 1,966. He then won the general election against his opponent, Magdalene Markward.

Klopfenstein was sworn in on January 1, 2023. He is running for reelection, and won the primaries unopposed.
