= Lynn Wachtmann =

American politician (born 1954)

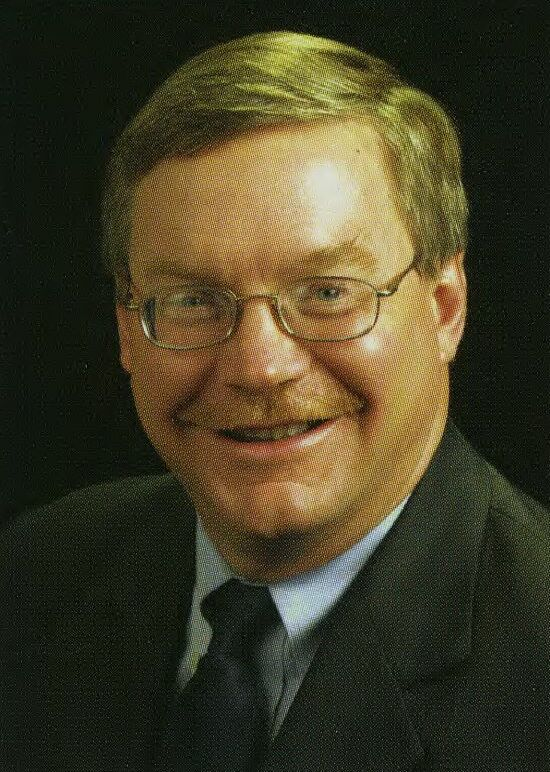

Member of the Ohio House of Representatives from the 81st district
- In office January 2, 2007 – December 31, 2014
- Preceded by: Jim Hoops
- Succeeded by: Rob McColley
- In office January 3, 1985 – December 31, 1998
- Preceded by: Chuck Earl
- Succeeded by: Jim Hoops

Member of the Ohio Senate from the 1st district
- In office January 5, 1999 – December 31, 2006
- Preceded by: M. Ben Gaeth
- Succeeded by: Steve Buehrer

Personal details
- Born: December 24, 1954 (age 71) Napoleon, Ohio, U.S.
- Party: Republican
- Education: Napoleon High School
- Profession: Small Business Owner

Lynn Wachtmann (born December 24, 1954) is a former Republican member of the Ohio House of Representatives, who had represented the 81st District from 2007 to 2014. Prior to his term in the House, Wachtmann was a two-term state Senator, representing the 1st district of the Ohio Senate from 1999 to 2006, and the 83rd District of the Ohio House of Representatives from 1985 to 1998. He is the Chairman of the House Health and Aging Committee.

== Career ==
Wachtmann is president of Maumee Valley Bottling, Inc. and a partner in Culligan Water Conditioning. When incumbent Chuck Earl decided to not seek another term in 1984, Wachtmann sought to replace him and won. He served seven more terms in the House, until 1998.

With the enactment of term limits, Wachtmann was nearing the end of his eligible tenure in the House. However, with incumbent Senator M. Ben Gaeth also facing term limits, Wachtmann ran for the Senate. Facing Democrat Timothy Holtsberry in the 1998 election, Wachtmann won with 65.91% of the electorate. In his 2002 reelection bid, he won with over 69.5% of the vote against Democrat William Flanary.

Wachtmann served as Senate Health Committee Chairman, and during Hurricane Katrina in 2005, delivered water to the devastated areas of New Orleans.

== Ohio House of Representatives, second tenure ==
In late 2005, Wachtmann, facing term limits in the Senate, announced that he would seek an Ohio House seat in 2006, which was an open seat. He had opposed in the primary by Paulding County Commissioner Tony Burkley. He won with 63.73% of the vote over Burkley. In the general election, he defeated Democrat Angie Byrne with 56.23% of the vote. Wachtmann served again as Chairman of the House Health Committee.

In 2008, Wachtmann ran unopposed. He won in 2010 with 72.05% of the vote over Democrat Cletus Schindler. It was announced in early December 2010 that Wachtmann was a potential contender to return to the Ohio Senate, but he soon after released a statement stating that he would remain in the House, and was sworn in for his tenth overall term.

With Republicans holding the House decisively, Wachtmann stated "This is the opportunity of a lifetime for guys like me to dramatically change the role of state government and empower the taxpayer by letting them keep more of their money."

During his tenure, He served on the committees of Commerce and Labor; Health and Aging (as Chairman) and its Subcommittee on Retirement and Pensions; and Insurance and its Subcommittee on Workers' Compensation. Wachtmann ran for re-election in 2010 in the new 81st District, where he defeated Democratic candidate John Vanover.

Wachtmann won a final term in 2012 with 68.10% of the vote over Democrat John Vanover.

== Policies, platforms and positions ==
=== Fiscal issues ===
With two public retirement systems looking to boost employer contribution rates to help shore up funding levels Wachtmann is developing new plans without those hikes. "This message is consistent with what I have been telling those pension systems for 18 months," he said. "It is no time to be asking the taxpayers of Ohio to be taking more out of their pocketbooks... to be more generous to public employees." He also is in favor of revising the pension plans for elected officials.

Wachtmann has remained against funding for an Ohio Bureau of Workers' Compensation taskforce that has not provided any analysis of legislation but still maintains a $1 million appropriation from the state.

=== Abortions ===
An opponent of abortion, Wachtmann has introduced legislation to ban abortions when a heartbeat is detected in the fetus, which is typically in the first trimester of a pregnancy. "One of my goals as a legislator is to push the pro-life agenda as far as we can," Wachtmann said. "The elections of Nov. 2 last year certainly changed the dynamics of public policy." With the bill introduced by Wachtmann being one of the most conservative abortion measures in the nation, even Ohio Right to Life has opposed it, stating it could possibly bring unwanted retributions against other abortion measures in the court of law. Speaker of the House William G. Batchelder also has been mum on support for the bill. However, the bill has gained support from Josh Mandel, Steve Chabot, Ken Blackwell and Mike Huckabee.

The bill was passed by the Ohio House of Representatives.

=== Collective bargaining ===
Wachtmann has been a staunch proponent of a bill that limits collective bargaining opportunities for public employees. He states that even if the bill is passed, public employers would still have vastly more rights than those who work in the private sector. A member of the committee that heard the bill, Wachtmann voted in favor of passage, and again out of the full Ohio House of Representatives, stating it will make government more efficient.

=== Environmental issues ===
Wachtmann has also introduced legislation that would allow for more water to be used out of Lake Erie. While opponents have said there could be negative environmental impacts, Wachtmann has stated this is mere "fearmongering". He has accused environmental organizations of long using the Great Lakes Compact as a rigid withdrawal tool. Critics have argued that Wachtmann's ownership of the Maumee Valley Bottlers bottling company (he is majority share holder and Board President) presents a clear conflict of interest. Following a veto by Ohio Gov. John Kasich on July 14, 2011, Wachtmann denounced Kasich and vowed to seek an overturn of the veto.
