= Steve Buehrer =

American politician

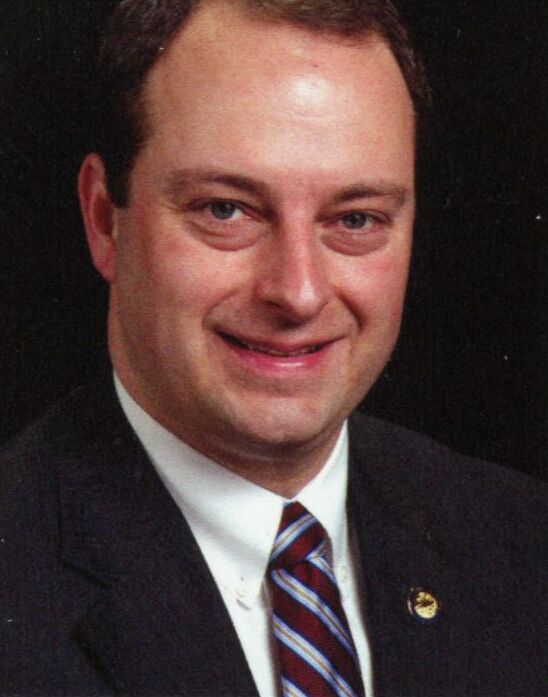

Member of the Ohio Senate from the 1st district
- In office January 2, 2007 – January 11, 2011
- Preceded by: Lynn Wachtmann
- Succeeded by: Cliff Hite

Member of the Ohio House of Representatives from the 74th district
- In office January 5, 1999 – December 31, 2006
- Preceded by: Richard Hodges
- Succeeded by: Bruce Goodwin

Personal details
- Born: September 16, 1967 (age 58) Toledo, Ohio
- Party: Republican
- Education: Bowling Green University, Capital University
- Profession: Lawyer

Stephen P. Buehrer (born January 1, 1967, Toledo, Ohio) is a former Republican member of the Ohio Senate who represented the 1st district, and was an unsuccessful candidate for U.S. Congress in the special election for Ohio's 5th congressional district to replace the late Paul Gillmor. Buehrer served as director of the Ohio Bureau of Workers' Compensation until April 2016.

== Life and career ==
Buehrer earned his Bachelor of Science in Social Studies Education from Bowling Green State University, and graduated Summa Cum Laude. He later attended Capital University Law School, where he earned his Juris Doctor and graduated cum laude. Buehrer lives in Delta, Ohio, with his wife, Cathy, and three sons.

Buehrer served as State Representative from 1998 to 2007. While Representative he was elected Assistant Majority Floor Leader for both the 124th and 125th General Assembly. He has also served as an intern for former Congressman Paul Gillmor, as an aide to former State Representative Jo Ann Davidson, and served in the administration of Governor George V. Voinovich. Buehrer serves as the state co-chair of the American Legislative Exchange Council (ALEC).

== Ohio Senate ==
In 2006, Senator Lynn Wachtmann was unable to run for reelection for the 1st district due to term limits, as a result, Buehrer, who was also term limited, sought the seat. In the primary election, he faced Jim Hoops, who was also an incumbent member of the Ohio House of Representatives. Buehrer easily won the Republican nomination against Hoops, securing 60.75% of the electorate. With the district being one of the most Republican in Ohio, Buehrer easily won the general election with 60.08% of the vote. He took a seat in the Senate on January 2, 2007, and served as Chairman of the Highways and Transportation Committee in his freshman term.

When Congressman Paul Gillmor died unexpectedly, Buehrer entered the special election to replace him. However, he failed to secure the Republican nomination, losing to Bob Latta 43.66% to 40.23%.

Returning to the Senate, Buehrer served as chairman of the Insurance, Commerce and Labor Committee for the 128th Ohio General Assembly. He won reelection to his seat in 2010, securing exactly 74% of the vote against Democrat Eric Cramner.

In late November 2010, Governor-elect John Kasich announced that Buehrer would serve as the next director of the Ohio Bureau of Workers' Compensation. Although he had just won a second term, he resigned from his Senate seat to take the post, and was succeeded by Cliff Hite.
