= Toledo Metropolitan Area Council of Governments =

Metropolitan planning organization

The Toledo Metropolitan Area Council of Governments (TMACOG) is a voluntary organization of dues-paying members. TMACOG members include governmental and non-governmental organizations in northwest Ohio and southeast Michigan: cities, counties, villages, and townships, as well as schools and colleges, park districts, businesses, and other groups concerned with quality of life in the region. TMACOG is both a regional council and a metropolitan planning organization.

== Membership ==
Current members include the counties of Lucas, Ottawa, Sandusky and Wood in Ohio, and Monroe County in Michigan.

Other members include various cities, villages, townships, businesses, and schools within those counties and the counties of Fulton, Hancock, Henry, Sandusky, and Seneca in Ohio and Lenawee County in Michigan.

The TMACOG region includes Fulton, Lucas, Monroe, Ottawa, Sandusky, and Wood counties. A complete list of members (updated October 2013), along with a map, can be found here.

- The city of Fostoria, Ohio is located within the counties of Hancock, Seneca, and Wood; even though Hancock and Seneca counties have no affiliation with TMACOG otherwise.

== History ==
TMACOG was formed in 1968 "primarily to review federally funded projects and to address federal initiatives and local intergovernmental needs." It originally included Lucas, Wood, and Monroe counties, and by 1974 would expand to include Erie, Ottawa, and Sandusky counties into its region. It became the water quality planning agency for the area in 1975 and would be recognized by the state as "the areawide agency responsible for carrying out programs that led to planned rural development and urban growth, better transportation systems, improved water and air quality, wiser use of energy and natural resources, and long-term economic vitality."

During the 1980s, federal funding worsened and a greater responsibility came to state governments. As a result, many regional councils turned to state governments for funding and direction. TMACOG's membership dropped, including the losses of Erie, Ottawa, Sandusky, and Wood counties. To continue its existence, TMACOG began to focus some of its attention onto railroad projects, energy conservation, air and water pollution, and economic development. The organization also began to focus on small town needs, transportation around the Maumee River, and other beneficial developments around the area. Membership would begin to grow again in the early 1990s, with 60 members in 1993, including the readmission of Ottawa and Wood counties. By adding non-governmental members as well, TMACOG has made its organization more diverse and able to help strengthen the quality of the Toledo area.

== Initiatives ==
TMACOG partners with other MPOs in Ohio to provide Gohio Commute, a web-based tool which allows commuters to plan trips with a variety of alternatives, like car pooling, biking, and public transit. The service offers rewards to incentivize users to try new modes of transit. The site became available in 2017.
