= Ohio's 14th senatorial district =

American legislative district

Ohio's 14th State Senate district
Senator
Terry Johnson; R–McDermott
- Demographics: 91.2% White; 2.6% Black; 1.9% Hispanic; 1.3% Asian; 2.5% Native American; 0.1% Hawaiian/Pacific Islander
- Population (2020) • Voting age • Citizens of voting age: 353,762; 273,573; 269,750

Ohio's 14th senatorial district after 2023 redistricting now includes all of Clermont, Brown, Adams, and Scioto. It encompasses Ohio House Districts 62, 63,and 90.

The current Ohio Senator is Republican Terry Johnson.

== Historically ==
Before the 2023 redistricting, Ohio's 14th district stretched across the Ohio River east of Cincinnati in southern Ohio. Currently it encompasses th e counties of Clermont, Brown, Adams, Scioto and portions of Lawrence County. It encompasses Ohio House districts 65, 66 and 90. It has a Cook PVI of R+23.

== List of senators ==
Senator	Party	Term	Notes
Oakley C. Collins	Republican	January 3, 1951 – December 31, 1972	Collins ran for the Ohio House of Representatives in 1972 after being redistricted.
Bill Mussey	Republican	January 3, 1973 – March 30, 1979	Mussey retired prior to the expiration of his term.
Cooper Snyder	Republican	April 3, 1979 – March 30, 1996	Snyder retired prior to the expiration of his term.
Doug White	Republican	April 16, 1996 – December 31, 2004	White served as Senate President from 2003 to 2004 and was term-limited in 2004.
Tom Niehaus	Republican	January 2, 2005 – December 31, 2012	Niehaus served as Senate President from 2011 to 2012 and was term-limited in 2012.
Joe Uecker	Republican	January 7, 2013 – September 3, 2019	Uecker resigned prior to the expiration of his term.
Terry Johnson	Republican	September 4, 2019 – present	Incumbent
