= Kris Jordan =

American politician in Ohio (1977–2023)

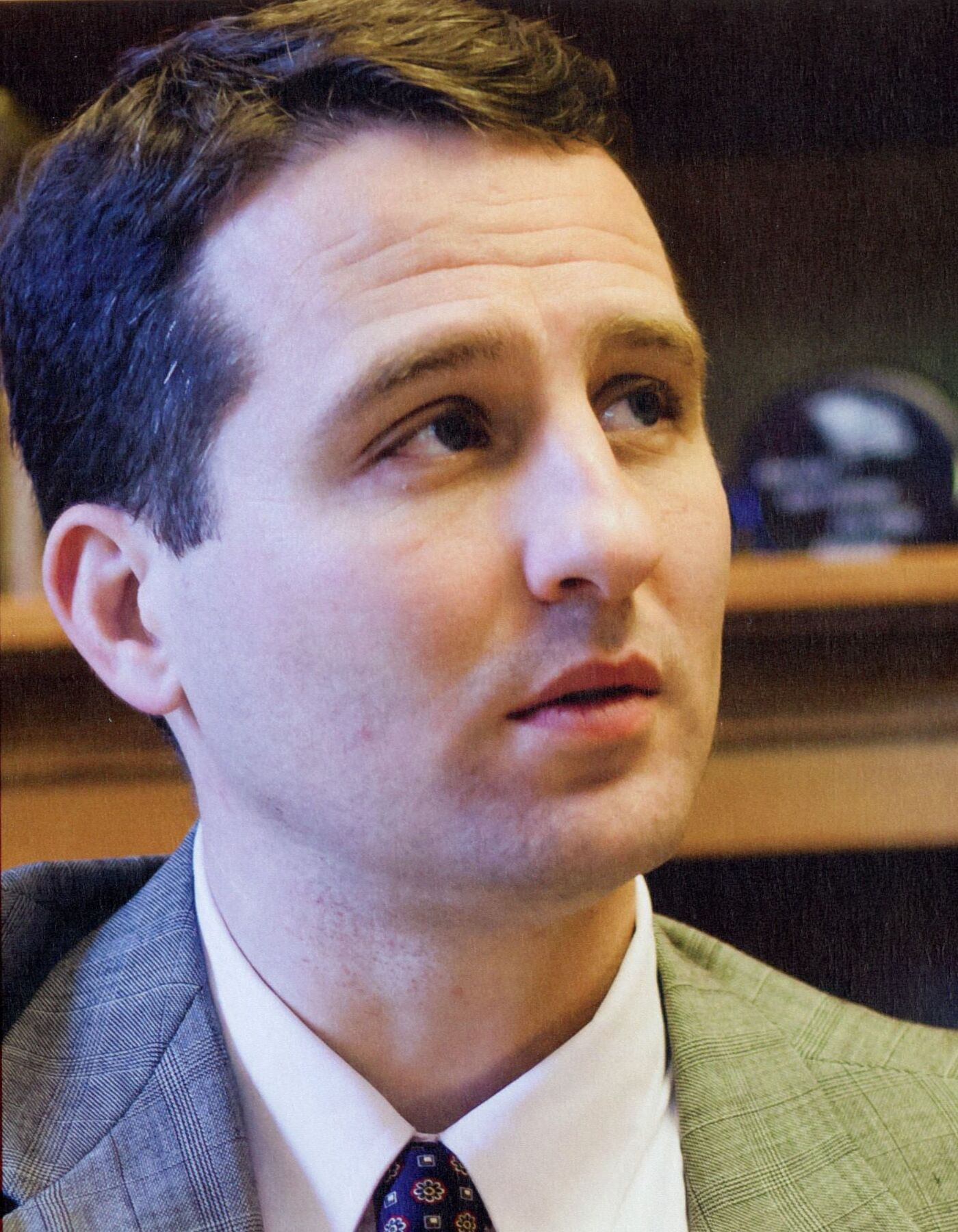

Member of the Ohio House of Representatives
- In office January 2, 2023 – February 25, 2023
- Preceded by: Dan Troy
- Succeeded by: Brian Lorenz
- Constituency: 60th district
- In office January 7, 2019 – December 31, 2022
- Preceded by: Andrew Brenner
- Succeeded by: Melanie Miller
- Constituency: 67th district
- In office January 5, 2009 – December 31, 2010
- Preceded by: Jon Peterson
- Succeeded by: Andrew Brenner
- Constituency: 2nd district

Member of the Ohio Senate from the 19th district
- In office January 3, 2011 – December 31, 2018
- Preceded by: Bill Harris
- Succeeded by: Andrew Brenner

Personal details
- Born: February 10, 1977 Columbus, Ohio, U.S.
- Died: February 25, 2023 (aged 46)
- Party: Republican
- Spouse: Melissa (divorced)
- Children: 3
- Education: Ohio State University

Kristopher W. Jordan (February 10, 1977 – February 25, 2023) was an American politician in the Republican Party. He was a member of the Ohio House of Representatives from 2019 until his death (after a previous term from 2009 to 2010), and the Ohio Senate from 2011 to 2019, where he was chairman of the Senate State and Local Government and Veterans Affairs Committee.

== Career ==
After graduation from the Ohio State University, Jordan served two terms as a Delaware County commissioner and worked for Rep. Joan Lawrence and as a legislative aide to Rep. Jon Peterson. Jordan was a member of the Delaware County Farm Bureau, Hiram Masonic Lodge, the Delaware County Township Association and the County Commissioner Association of Ohio.

With incumbent Jon Peterson unable to run again because of term limits in 2008, Jordan, a former aide of Peterson, sought to replace him. Among four candidates, Jordan secured the Republican nomination with 53.31% of the vote. He won the general election against Democrat Janice Lanier with 61.29% of the vote. After his victory, colleagues named Jordan House assistant minority whip. Speaker of the House Armond Budish also named Jordan as a member of the Controlling Board.

== Ohio Senate ==
In late 2009, Jordan announced that he would seek the Ohio Senate seat held by Bill Harris in 2010. The election race put Jordan against former Representative Thom Collier and Knox County GOP Party Chairman Lou Petros. Jordan won the GOP nomination with 53.9% of the vote. He won the general election with 69.08% of the vote against Democrat Neil Patel.

Jordan was sworn into his first term on January 3, 2011. Subsequently, Senate President Tom Niehaus appointed him to the Joint Committee on Agency Rule Review, and the standing committees on Government Oversight and Reform, including Health, Human Services and Aging, Highways and Transportation, Insurance, Commerce and Labor, Agriculture, Environment and Natural Resources, and State and Local Government and Veteran's Affairs (as Chairman).

== Policies, positions and initiatives ==
=== Abortion ===
In 2016, Jordan introduced the Ohio "Heartbeat Bill", a bill outlawing abortions after about six weeks of pregnancy. The Ohio General Assembly passed the bill on December 6, 2016.

In 2019, Jordan co-sponsored legislation that would ban abortion in Ohio. Doctors who performed abortions in cases of ectopic pregnancy and other life-threatening conditions would be exempt from prosecution only if they "[took] all possible steps to preserve the life of the unborn child, while preserving the life of the woman. Such steps include, if applicable, attempting to reimplant an ectopic pregnancy into the woman's uterus". Reimplantation of an ectopic pregnancy is not a recognized or medically feasible procedure.

=== Fiscal issues ===
In one of his earliest initiatives, Jordan introduced legislation that would eliminate the Ohio estate tax. He has stated that it is an effort to help keep more small business owners and the jobs they create in Ohio. However, local governments see the bill as another potential blow to their already strained budgets.

Jordan was a proponent of fracking in state parks due to the potential benefits it could bring to solving Ohio's budgetary problems. He sees the usage of natural resources as an answer to help with fiscal recovery. He was adamant about stating that there are no real environmental concerns surrounding fracking.

== Personal life and death ==
Jordan and his wife, Melissa, had three children. In July 2011, Jordan was investigated for fourth degree domestic violence after an altercation with his wife in which she called 911 for help. Jordan told the Delaware County sheriff's deputies who responded to the call that his wife "got a little upset … girls do that." He and his wife later divorced.

Jordan died on February 25, 2023, at the age of 46 following a diabetic reaction. Jordan was a type 1 diabetic since the age of 18.
