= Thaddeus E. Cromley =

American politician

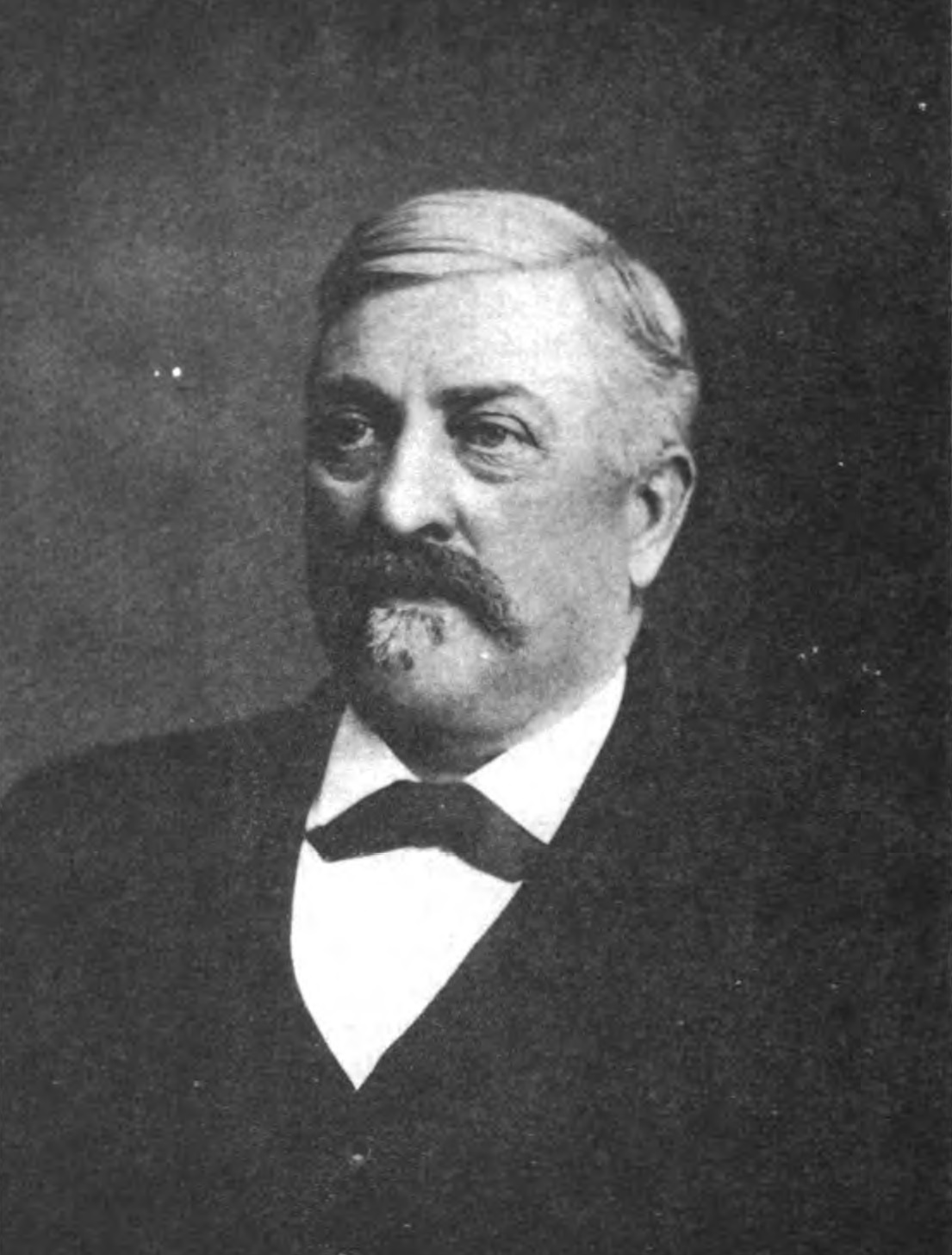

Member of the Ohio Senate from the 10th district
- In office January 6, 1896 – December 31, 1899 Serving with Nial R. Hysell (1896-98); John C. L. Pugh (1898-1900)
- Preceded by: Moses B. Earnhart
- Succeeded by: Edward D. Howard

Member of the Ohio House of Representatives from the Pickaway district
- In office January 2, 1888 – January 3, 1892
- Preceded by: Wesley Work
- Succeeded by: Daniel Haas

Personal details
- Born: June 21, 1843 Pickaway County, Ohio
- Died: April 20, 1921 (aged 77) Walnut Township, Pickaway County, Ohio
- Resting place: Forest Cemetery; Circleville, Ohio
- Party: Democratic
- Spouse: Mary Rebecca Millar
- Children: eight
- Education: Kenyon College (A.B. 1865) (A.M. 1868)

Thaddeus E. Cromley (21 June 1843 – 20 April 1921) was a Democratic politician from Ohio. He served in both houses of the Ohio Legislature, holding a leadership position in the Ohio State Senate during the nineteenth century.

Thaddeus Cromley descended from German immigrants named Grammlich, who settled in Pennsylvania in 1749. The name was eventually anglicized to Cromley. He was born on his father's Pickaway County, Ohio farm on June 21, 1843. His parents were William and Sarah E. (Staige) Cromley. He attended the local log schoolhouse, and he studied at Circleville Union School beginning at age 16. He entered Kenyon College in 1861 and graduated with an A.B. in 1865 and an A.M. three years later. He became a farmer and stock raiser.

Cromley served as a township trustee and member of the Board of Education. He was elected as a Democrat to the Ohio House of Representatives in 1887 by a plurality of 1,116 votes, and was re-elected in 1889 by a plurality of 1,090 votes. In 1890, he was the nominee for Ohio Secretary of State, but lost to Republican Daniel J. Ryan.

In 1892, Cromley was appointed by Governor McKinley as a trustee of the Boy's Industrial School in Fairfield County. He held that position until 1896. In 1895 he was elected to the Ohio State Senate from the tenth district (Franklin and Pickaway counties) with a plurality of 961 votes, and was re-elected in 1897 by 2,373 votes. In the latter term he was President Pro Tempore and chairman of the Committees on Finance and Rules.

In 1900, Cromley was elected to the State Board of Agriculture, and he was re-elected in 1905. He was married to Mary Rebecca Millar of Pickaway County on October 6, 1870. They had eight children. He was a member of the Knights of Pythias, Chi Phi and Phi Beta Kappa. Cromley died at his Walnut Township home on April 17, 1921. He was interred at Forest Cemetery in Circleville.

== Notes ==
Ohio Senate
Preceded by John C. Hutsinpiller	President of the Ohio Senate; 1898-1899	Succeeded by Oscar Sheppard
Ohio House of Representatives
Preceded by Wesley Work	Representative from Pickaway County; 1888-1891	Succeeded by Daniel Haas
