= Senator Archer =

Senator Archer may refer to:

- Brian Archer (1929–2013), Australian Senator from Tasmania from 1975 to 1994
- Frank B. Archer (1858–1914), Ohio State Senate
- William Beatty Archer (1793–1870), Illinois Senate
- William S. Archer (1789–1855), U.S. Senator from 1841 to 1847
