= David T. Daniels =

Republican politician

David Daniels

Director of the Ohio Department of Agriculture
- In office February 2012 – October 2018
- Governor: John Kasich
- Succeeded by: Dorothy Pelanda

Member of the Ohio Senate from the 17th district
- In office January 3, 2011 – February 24, 2012
- Preceded by: John Carey
- Succeeded by: Bob Peterson

Member of the Ohio House of Representatives from the 86th district
- In office January 6, 2003 – December 31, 2010
- Preceded by: Dennis Stapleton
- Succeeded by: Cliff Rosenberger

Personal details
- Born: January 14, 1957 (age 69) Greenfield, Ohio
- Party: Republican
- Profession: Farmer

David Daniels (born February 1, 1957) is a Republican politician who since October 2020 is a Highland County, Ohio Commissioner. He previously served as the director of the Ohio Department of Agriculture from February 2012 until October 2018. From 2011 to 2012, he represented the 17th District as a member of the Ohio Senate. From 2003 to 2010, he served as a member of the Ohio House of Representatives, representing the 86th District. Daniels previously served as Highland County commissioner from 1997 to 2002. He was mayor of Greenfield, Ohio from 1988 to 1995, and served as a City Council from 1984 to 1988.

== Career ==
Prior to government, Daniels and his father managed the Daniels Brothers Farm. Daniels served four years on Greenfield City Council and was Mayor for eight years. He also served as a Highland County Commissioner for six years.

With an open seat available in 2002, Daniels won a three-way primary to take the Republican nomination with 41.85% of the vote. He defeated Democrat Bill Horne with 63.4% of the vote to take his first term. In 2004, he again defeated Horne with 61.08% of the vote, and again with 53.16% of the vote in 2006. Daniels was selected as chairman of the State Government and Elections Committee for the 127th General Assembly. In 2008, Daniels again beat Horne with 57.5% of the vote to take a final term.

== Ohio Senate ==
With incumbent John Carey unable to run again in 2010 due to term limits, Daniels entered the race to succeed him. However, he faced fellow Representative Clyde Evans in the primary election. It proved to be a divisive, negative primary, which included election complaints filed by both candidates. In the end, Daniels defeated Evans with 51.62% of the vote to take the nomination. Daniels faced Gallia County Commissioner Justin Fallon in the general election. While Democrats were hoping for an upset, Daniels won the general election with 63.39% of the vote.

On January 3, 2011, Daniels was sworn into office for his first term. Senate President Tom Niehaus subsequently named Daniels as a member of the Energy and Public Utilities Committee (as Chairman); Finance; Financial Institutions; and State and Local Government and Veteran's Affairs (as vice chairman). He also serves on the Southern Ohio Agricultural and Community Development Foundation; the Lawrence County Transportation Improvement District; and the Power Siting Board.
