= Danny Bubp =

American politician

Member of the Ohio House of Representatives from the 88th district
- In office January 3, 2005 – January 7, 2013
- Preceded by: Tom Niehaus
- Succeeded by: Doug Green

Personal details
- Born: September 27, 1954 (age 71) Cincinnati, Ohio, U.S.
- Party: Republican
- Education: University of Cincinnati (BS); Ohio Northern University (JD)

Danny R. Bubp (born September 27, 1954) is a former Republican member of the Ohio House of Representatives, representing the 88th District from 2005 to 2012.

== Life and career ==
Bubp attained a B.S. in criminal justice from the University of Cincinnati in 1978 and a J.D. from the Ohio Northern University College of Law in 1984. He earned the rank of colonel in the Marine Corps Reserve. Bubp worked as a lawyer in Adams County, Ohio and served as probate and juvenile judge for a year.

Beginning in March 1999, Bubp served as pro bono legal counsel for and was a founding member of Adams County for the Ten Commandments, a group formed to oppose the removal of Ten Commandments monuments following a legal challenge from the ACLU. From November 2007 to December 2008, Bubp served in Iraq as the 1st Marine Expeditionary Force Liaison Officer to the governor of Al Anbar Governorate.

== Ohio House of Representatives ==
Bubp was originally elected to the Ohio House of Representatives in 2004 succeeding Tom Niehaus, and was subsequently reelected in 2006, 2008, 2010. He faced term limits in 2012. In his 2006 re-election, Bubp faced only token opposition in the Republican primary, and no opposition in the general election.

In the 129th General Assembly, Bubp is serving as Chairman of the House Judiciary Committee. He also serves on the committees of Criminal Justice; and Veteran's Affairs.

== Initiatives, policies and positions ==
In 2011, Bubp introduced a bill that would clarify the difference between civil and criminal penalties associated with livestock owners' failure to keep their animals from running at large.

Reintroducing a measure from the 128th General Assembly, Bubp, along with Terry Johnson sponsored legislation that would allow concealed carry licensees to take their weapons into establishments that serve alcohol so long as they do not consume alcohol and would remove storage mandates for keeping firearms in vehicles. The bill has been controversial with some lawmakers concerned about opposition from the Ohio Restaurant Association.

Bubp has come out against legislation that looks to abolish the death penalty in Ohio. With critics and opponents of the legislation stating that there is evidence of discrimination towards minorities, Bubp has stated that as a former judge, he is outraged that individuals would insinuate that prosecutors behave differently due to race.

== Controversies ==
=== Jean Schmidt comments ===
Bubp has close ties to U.S. Representative Jean Schmidt, also from Ohio. He campaigned on behalf of Schmidt during her close race against Paul Hackett, also a U.S. Marine.

On November 18, 2005, during a U.S. House debate about a resolution calling for the withdrawal of US troops from Iraq prompted by strong public comments from U.S. Representative John Murtha (D-PA), Schmidt commented:

A few minutes ago I received a call from Colonel Danny Bubp, Ohio Representative from the 88th district in the House of Representatives. He asked me to send Congress a message: stay the course. He also asked me to send Congressman Murtha a message, that cowards cut and run, Marines never do. Danny and the rest of America and the world want the assurance from this body—that we will see this through.

Schmidt's remarks were immediately criticized and within ten minutes, she withdrew them and apologized. Karen Tabor, Bubp's spokeswoman, said Bubp "did not mention Congressman Murtha by name nor did he mean to disparage Congressman Murtha ... He feels as though the words that Congresswoman Schmidt chose did not represent their conversation." Bubp told The Cincinnati Enquirer that he never mentioned Murtha by name when talking to Schmidt and would never call another U.S. Marine a coward. Bubp later said, "I don't want to be interjected into this. I wish she never used my name."

In discussing the incident, Rush Limbaugh and Tucker Carlson both claimed that Bubp was in Iraq when he spoke to Schmidt in 2005. Bubp was not in Iraq when he spoke to Schmidt in 2005, nor had he served in the Iraq War at the time of the controversy. Bubp would later serve in Iraq from November 2007 to November 2008.

=== Allegations of illegal service in two public offices ===
On October 22, 2009, the chairman of the local Democratic Party in the three counties comprising District 88 in the Ohio House of Representatives (Clermont, Brown and Adams Counties) filed complaints with their local prosecuting attorneys and the Ohio Attorney General claiming that Bubp was in violation of the Ohio Constitution and Ohio law by serving as both a member of the Ohio General Assembly and as a magistrate judge for the village of Ripley. According to the complaint, the Ohio Constitution and the Ohio Revised Code make it illegal to hold these two public offices at the same time. If the allegations of the complaint were confirmed, the matter could be submitted to the Ohio Supreme Court which would be called upon to rule whether Bubp, by accepting a second public office, forfeited his seat in the Ohio House of Representatives.

=== Allegations concerning mishandling of probate estate ===
On July 29, 2014, a letter was received by the Adams County Common Pleas Court raising issues relating to Bubp's handling of the probate estate of Hubert C. Wescott in 2009 to 2010. According to the letter, a parcel of real estate in the probate estate was appraised for $100,000. Through Bubp's handling of the estate, the property was sold to Michael L. Morgan an alleged "close associate" of Mr. Bubp's for $72,000. On the same day that the probate estate transferred the property to him, Mr. Morgan turned around and transferred the property to Bubp. The deed to Bubp was not recorded until Nov. 29, 2011. As Bubp was a licensed attorney, the issue was referred to the Ohio Supreme Court's Disciplinary Council on May 28, 2014. Disciplinary Council later dismissed the grievance against Bubp noting, however, that the grievance could be filed again, if appropriate, when the Adams County case is closed.
