= Jacob Henry Miller =

American lawyer

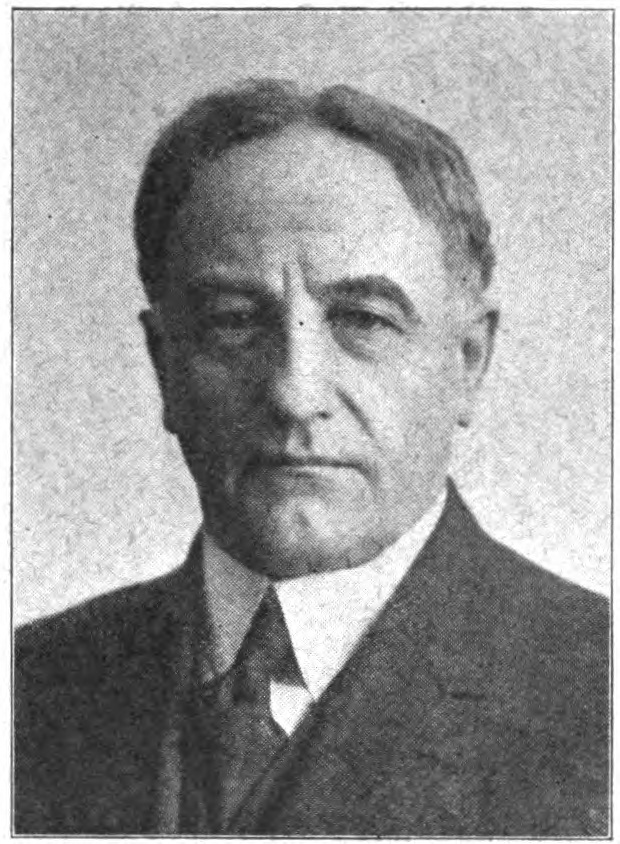

President of the Ohio Senate
- In office January 1, 1917 – January 5, 1919
- Preceded by: Charles John Howard
- Succeeded by: Frank E. Whittemore

Personal details
- Born: October 3, 1865 Licking County, Ohio, US
- Died: 1920
- Resting place: Cedar Hill Cemetery, Newark, Ohio
- Party: Democratic
- Education: Bethany College; Ohio Northern University Pettit College of Law

Jacob Henry Miller was a lawyer from the U.S. State of Ohio who served as President of the Ohio State Senate.

== Biography ==
Miller was born October 3, 1865, in Licking County, Ohio. He graduated from Bethany College in West Virginia with A.B., and from Ohio Northern University Pettit College of Law with L.L.B.

Miller was elected to the Ohio State Senate 1917–1918, and served as President of the Senate. He was a member of Delta Tau Delta, and supported women's suffrage and prohibition.
