= John Carey (Ohio state legislator) =

American politician (born 1959)

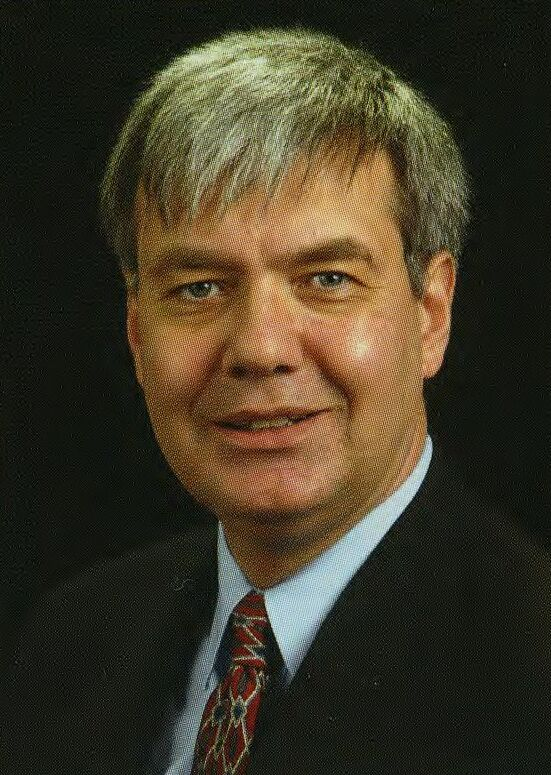

Chancellor of the Ohio Department of Higher Education
- In office 2013 – 2018
- Governor: John Kasich
- Preceded by: Jim Petro
- Succeeded by: Randy Gardner

Member of the Ohio House of Representatives from the 87th district
- In office January 3, 2011 – December 16, 2011
- Preceded by: Clyde Evans
- Succeeded by: Philip H. Rose
- In office January 3, 1995 – December 31, 2002
- Preceded by: Mark Malone
- Succeeded by: Clyde Evans

Member of the Ohio Senate from the 17th district
- In office January 6, 2003 – December 31, 2010
- Preceded by: Mike Shoemaker
- Succeeded by: David T. Daniels

Personal details
- Born: April 18, 1959 (age 67) Chillicothe, Ohio, U.S.
- Party: Republican
- Education: Ohio University

John Carey (born April 18, 1959) is an American politician. A member of the Republican Party, he served in the Ohio House of Representatives from 1995 to 2002, and again in 2011, as well as the Ohio Senate from 2003 to 2010. Carey later served as the chancellor of the Ohio Board of Regents (renamed the Ohio Department of Higher Education) from 2013 to 2018.

== Early life and education ==
Carey graduated from Wellston High School and attended Ohio University, where he earned a degree in political science. After college, he worked as an aide to U.S. Representative Clarence Miller and served as Mayor of Wellston from 1988 to 1994.

== Career ==
Carey defeated incumbent Representative Mark Malone in 1994 to take his first term in the Ohio House of Representatives, and won reelection handily in 1996. In 1998, Carey defeated Democrat Bill Oiler with 64.97% of the electorate to take a third term. For his fourth term in 2000, he ran unopposed.

Term limited in the House after 2002, Carey sought to face incumbent Senator Mike Shoemaker to move up to the Ohio Senate. While the seat had been held by Democrats since the mid-1980s, redistricting made the seat solidly Republican. He defeated Shoemaker to take his first term with 53.8% of the vote.

For the 126th General Assembly, Senate President Bill Harris named Carey as Chairman of the Senate Finance Committee, and he continued to serve in the capacity for the 127th and 128th General Assemblies. For his reelection bid in 2006, Carey faced Democrat April Howland, but easily won reelection with 60.08% of the vote.

Again term limited, Carey returned to the Ohio House in 2010, and ran to succeed Clyde Evans. He went on to win the seat with 64.19% of the vote.

Carey served as vice chairman of the House Finance and Financial Institutions Committee, under Chairman Ron Amstutz, and as Chairman of the Primary and Secondary Education Subcommittee in the 129th General Assembly. He also served on the committee of Agriculture and Natural Resources. Carey is also a member of the Lawrence County Transportation Improvement District Board of Trustees.

== House initiatives and positions ==
With Carey a key player in Ohio education reform as Chairman of the Primary and Secondary Education Subcommittee, Carey is leading an effort to reform Ohio school funding, and to change the current evidence based model. While he supports some changes, he believes the overall formula is set up fair.

After the most recent budget bill adjusted the number of calamity days school districts can use each year from five to three, there was great concern from school districts citing costs. Carey introduced legislation, along with Casey Kozlowski, that would allow for five calamity days starting as early as the present school year. He stated that bring the available days back up to three allows for education needs to be met while also ensuring safety for students.

As vice chairman of the Finance Committee, Carey was responsible for appropriating the privatization of the Ohio Department of Development. While it is a controversial approach, Carey has stated, "What we're doing now isn't working," he said about the state's existing job creation programs. "We need to take a step, even though there are risks involved. But I think we need to take these risks to help our constituents." Carey has also been adement about being cautious with local government funds.

An opponent of the estate tax, Carey has claimed that jobs have been lost in his district as a result of the taxation, and is in favor of initiatives to abolish the tax.

Carey was a member of the conference committee on the 2013–2014 budget. The goal of a conference committee is to discuss differences between the House and Senate versions of the budget legislation and decide on a common solution.

Preceded by Jim Petro	Chancellor of University System of Ohio; 2013–present	Incumbent
