= Senator Shepard =

Senator Shepard may refer to:

- Mark Shepard (born 1960), Vermont State Senate
- Seth Shepard (1847–1917), Texas State Senate
- William Biddle Shepard (1799–1852), North Carolina State Senate
- Abraham Shepherd (1776–1847), Ohio State Senate
- Derrick Shepherd (born 1970), Louisiana State Senate

== See also ==
- Morris Sheppard (1875–1941), U.S. Senator from Texas
- Oscar Sheppard (1845–1922), Ohio State Senate
