= Brian Baldridge =

American politician

Director of the Ohio Department of Agriculture
- Incumbent
- Assumed office February 1, 2023
- Governor: Mike DeWine
- Preceded by: Dorothy Pelanda

Member of the Ohio House of Representatives from the 90th district
- In office January 7, 2019 – January 31, 2023
- Preceded by: Terry Johnson
- Succeeded by: Justin Pizzulli

Personal details
- Born: January 21, 1969 (age 57) West Union, Ohio
- Party: Republican

Brian Baldridge (born January 21, 1969) is current Director of the Ohio Department of Agriculture. He is a former member of the Ohio House of Representatives, representing the 90th district from 2019 until his resignation in 2023. He is a Republican. The district comprises Adams and Scioto counties as well as a portion of Lawrence county. Baldridge is currently serving as a full-time firefighter/paramedic with Anderson Township Fire Department. Baldridge previously served as an Adams County Commissioner and prior to that served as a Wayne Township Trustee in Adams County. He also has served as a firefighter while also working as a farmer, including on a farm owned for seven generations by his family.

In 2018, state Representative Terry Johnson was term limited and unable to run for another term. Baldridge won a crowded Republican primary for the seat, and went on to win the general election against Democrat Adrienne Buckler with over 61% of the vote.

Baldridge resigned his seat in the House on January 31, 2023, after being appointed the 40th Director of the Ohio Department of Agriculture by Governor Mike DeWine.

== Association with Team Householder ==
During the 2018 Ohio House election cycle, Jean Schmidt was identified in reporting as one of the Republican candidates recruited by then-State Representative Larry Householder as part of an organized effort to regain the speakership of the Ohio House of Representatives. According to an investigation by Cleveland.com, Householder assembled a slate of candidates, commonly referred to as “Team Householder,” who were encouraged to run for office with the expectation that they would support his bid for Speaker if elected. Schmidt was listed among the candidates recruited as part of this strategy.

The successful election of multiple Team Householder candidates enabled Householder to secure enough internal support to be elected Speaker at the start of the 133rd Ohio General Assembly.

This reporting occurred amid broader investigations that later became known as the Ohio nuclear bribery scandal.

== Links ==
- Representative Brian Baldridge (official site)
