= James M. Williams =

American politician

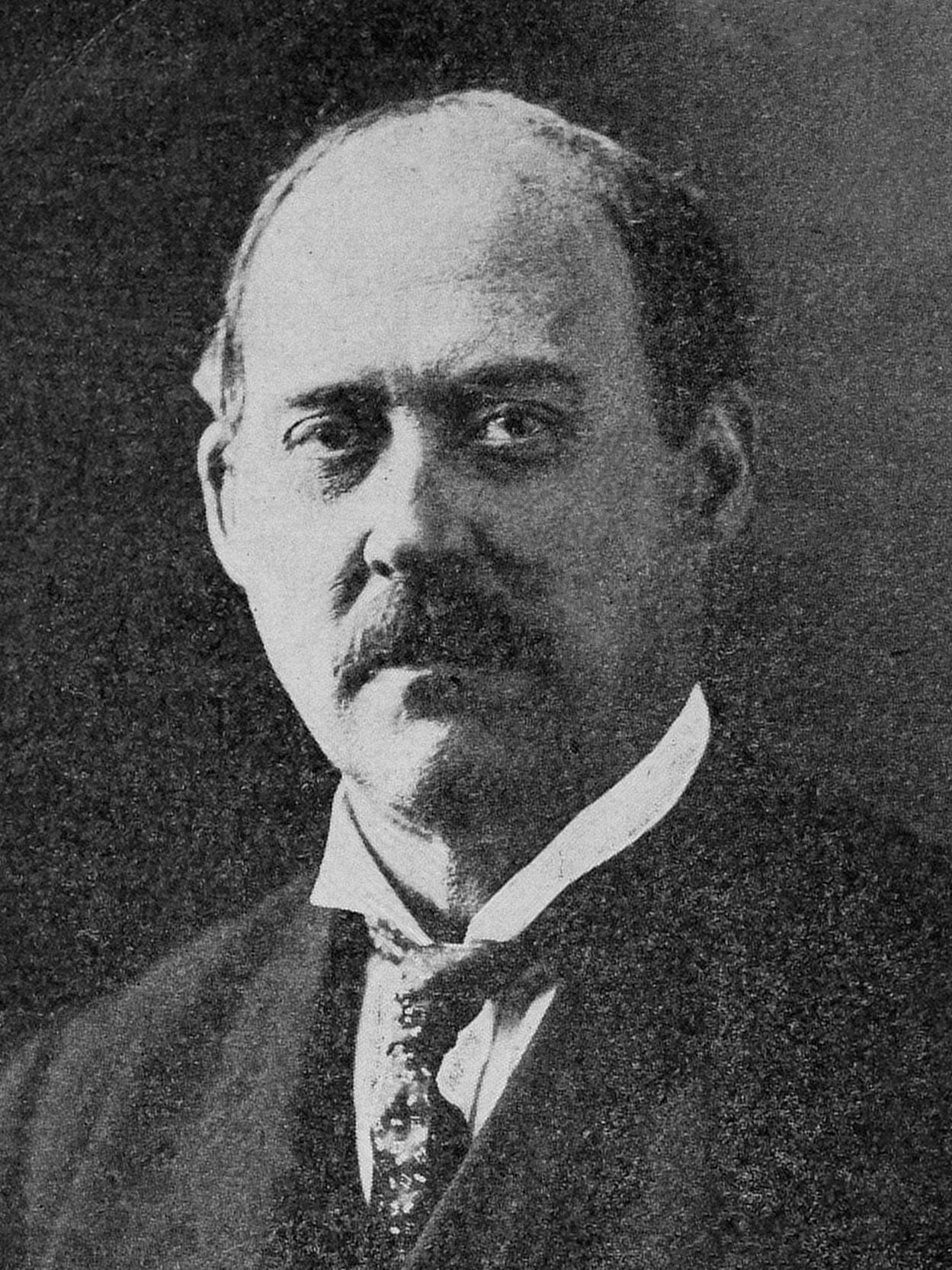

President of the Ohio Senate
- In office January 1, 1906 – January 3, 1909
- Preceded by: George Henry Chamberlain
- Succeeded by: Nation O. Mather

Personal details
- Born: July 22, 1850 Plainfield, Ohio, US
- Died: May 22, 1909 (aged 58) Cleveland, Ohio, US
- Resting place: Quincy Rural Cemetery, Ripley, New York
- Party: Democratic
- Spouse: Mary S. Brockway
- Children: one
- Education: Allegheny College

James M. Williams (22 July 1850 – 22 May 1909) was a politician from Cleveland, Ohio, United States. He was a member of the Ohio House of Representatives and the Ohio State Senate, and was President of the Senate for two years.

== Early life ==
James M. Williams was born in Plainfield, Ohio on July 22, 1850. He was the son of Heslip Williams, a leading physician of the county and Ohio native, and Charlotte Miskimen Williams, also from Ohio. He left school at age thirteen to enlist as a private in Company C, 3rd United States Cavalry during the American Civil War. He served in the campaigns in Tennessee, Mississippi, and Arkansas. After the war, Williams attended Newcomerstown High School and Allegheny College of Meadville, Pennsylvania, where he graduated in 1873.

== Legal career ==
Williams studied law in the office of Judge J.C. Pomerene of Coshocton, Ohio, and was admitted to the bar in 1875. He practiced law in Coshocton until 1888, when he moved to Cleveland. He edited the three-volume "Revised Statutes of Ohio" in 1883, which was adopted by the General Assembly, and distributed about the state. He was elected as a Democrat to the Ohio House of Representatives in 1885, and served a single two-year term. He drafted the 1885 constitutional amendment that was adopted by the public that changed state elections from October to November.

Williams was nominated for Judge of the Commons Pleas Court in 1888 and 1894, but not elected. He was successful in 1905 in election to the Ohio State Senate, and was chosen president pro tem. of that body. He was chairman of the Committees on Commercial Corporations and Rules, and member of the Judiciary, Taxation, County Affairs and Fees and Salaries committees.

== Personal ==
James M. Williams married Mary S. Brockway of Chautauqua County, New York in 1879. She had one daughter, and died in 1897.

Williams died in 1909 in Cleveland of a heart ailment.
