= List of presidents of the Ohio Senate =

President of the Senate of Ohio
- Seal of the president of the senate
- Incumbent; Rob McColley since January 6, 2025
- Inaugural holder: Nathaniel Massie (Speaker)
- Formation: Ohio Constitution
- Succession: Second

The president of the Ohio State Senate is the leader of the Ohio State Senate. Under Ohio's first constitution, in effect from 1803 to 1851, the presiding officer of the senate was called the speaker. Starting in 1851, when the second constitution took effect, a new office of lieutenant governor was created. The new position of lieutenant governor carried with it the office of president of the senate, and was nominally the presiding officer of the senate. During this time, the actual legislative leader of the senate majority was the president pro tempore of the Ohio Senate. In the 1970s, another change was made, which made the office of lieutenant governor elected jointly with the governor. At this time, the duty of presiding over the senate was removed from the lieutenant governor's portfolio and the majority party of the senate began electing its own president starting in 1979. The president is second in line to the office of the governor.

== Speakers of the Ohio Senate, 1803–1851 ==
Term	Name	Party	Home county
1803-03-01 – 1803-12-04	Nathaniel Massie	Democratic-Republican	Ross
1803-12-05 – 1805-02-21	Daniel Symmes	Democratic-Republican	Hamilton
1805-02-21 – 1806-11-30	James Pritchard	Democratic-Republican	Jefferson
1806-12-01 – 1809-12-03	Thomas Kirker	Democratic-Republican	Adams
1809-12-04 – 1810-12-02	Duncan McArthur	Democratic-Republican	Ross
1810-12-03 – 1813-12-05	Thomas Kirker (2nd)	Democratic-Republican	Adams
1813-12-06 – 1814-12-04	Othniel Looker	Democratic-Republican	Hamilton
1814-12-05 – 1815-12-03	Thomas Kirker (3rd)	Democratic-Republican	Adams
1815-12-04 – 1816-12-01	Peter Hitchcock	Democratic-Republican	Geauga
1816-12-02 – 1818-12-06	Abraham Shepherd	Democratic-Republican	Adams
1818-12-07 – 1819-12-05	Robert Lucas	Democratic-Republican	Pike
1819-12-06 – 1826-12-03	Allen Trimble	National Republican	Highland
1826-12-04 – 1827-12-02	Abraham Shepherd (2nd)	Democratic	Brown
1827-12-03 – 1829-12-06	Samuel Wheeler	National Republican	Geauga
1829-12-07 – 1830-12-05	Robert Lucas (2nd)	Democratic	Pike
1830-12-06 – 1831-12-04	Samuel R. Miller	Democratic	Hamilton
1831-12-05 – 1832-12-02	William Doherty	Whig	Franklin
1832-12-03 – 1833-12-01	Samuel R. Miller (2nd)	Democratic	Hamilton
1833-12-02 – 1834-11-30	David T. Disney	Democratic	Hamilton
1834-12-01 – 1835-03-06	Peter Hitchcock (2nd)	Whig	Geauga
1835-03-06 - 1835-06-07	Charles Anthony	Whig	Clark
1835-06-08 - 1835-12-06	David T. Disney (2nd)	Democratic	Hamilton
1835-12-07 – 1837-12-03	Elijah Vance	Democratic	Butler
1837-12-04 – 1838-12-02	George J. Smith	Whig	Warren
1838-12-03 – 1839-12-01	William Hawkins	Democratic	Morgan
1839-12-02 – 1841-12-05	William McLaughlin	Democratic	Richland
1841-12-06 – 1843-12-03	James J. Faran	Democratic	Hamilton
1843-12-04 – 1844-12-01	Thomas W. Bartley	Democratic	Richland
1844-12-02 – 1845-11-30	David Chambers	Whig	Muskingum
1845-12-01 – 1846-12-06	Seabury Ford	Whig	Geauga
1846-12-07 – 1847-12-05	Edson B. Olds	Democratic	Pickaway
1847-12-06 – 1848-12-03	Charles B. Goddard	Whig	Muskingum
1848-12-04 – 1849-12-02	Brewster Randall	Free Soil	Ashtabula
1849-12-03 – 1850-12-01	Harrison G. O. Blake	Whig	Medina
1850-12-02 – 1852-01-04	Charles Cleveland Convers	Whig	Muskingum

== Presidents pro tempore of the Ohio Senate, 1852–1978 ==
(At this time, the nominal presiding officer of the senate was the Lieutenant Governor of Ohio.)

Term	Name	Party	Home county
1852-01-05 – 1854-01-01	Joel W. Wilson; George Rex	Democratic	Sandusky; Wayne
1854-01-02 – 1856-01-06	Robert J. Atkinson	Democratic	Carroll
1856-01-07 – 1858-01-03	Robert Walker Tayler	Republican	Trumbull
1858-01-04 – 1860-01-01	Edward M. Phelps	Democratic	Defiance
1860-01-02 – 1862-01-05	Richard A. Harrison	Republican	Madison
1862-01-06 – 1864-01-03	James Monroe	Republican	Lorain
1864-01-04 – 1865-12-31	Samuel Humphreville	Republican	Medina
1866-01-01 – 1868-01-05	H. S. Martin	Republican	Stark
1868-01-06 – 1870-01-02	Thomas J. Godfrey	Democratic	Mercer
1870-01-03 – 1871-12-31	Samuel Furman Hunt	Democratic	Hamilton
1872-01-01 – 1874-01-04	Allen T. Brinsmade	Republican	Cuyahoga
1874-01-05 – 1876-01-02	Emery D. Potter	Democratic	Lucas
1876-01-03 – 1878-01-06	H. W. Curtiss	Republican	Cuyahoga
1878-01-07 – 1880-01-03	James W. Owens	Democratic	Licking
1880-01-04 – 1882-01-01	Rees G. Richards	Republican	Jefferson
1882-01-02 – 1884-01-06	Roland A. Horr	Republican	Lorain
1884-01-07 – 1886-01-03	Elmer White	Democratic	Defiance
1886-01-04 – 1888-01-01	John O'Neill; Silas A. Conrad	Democratic; Republican	Muskingum; Stark
1888-01-02 – 1890-01-05	Theodore F. Davis	Republican	Washington
1890-01-06 – 1892-01-03	Perry M. Adams	Democratic	Seneca
1892-01-04 – 1894-01-02	Elbert L. Lampson	Republican	Ashtabula
1894-01-03 – 1896-01-05	Thomas H. McConica	Republican	Hancock
1896-01-06 – 1898-01-02	John C. Hutsinpiller	Republican	Gallia
1898-01-03 – 1899-12-31	Thaddeus E. Cromley	Democratic	Pickaway
1900-01-01 – 1902-01-05	Oscar Sheppard	Republican	Preble
1902-01-06 – 1904-01-03	Frank B. Archer	Republican	Belmont
1904-01-04 – 1905-12-31	George Henry Chamberlain	Republican	Lorain
1906-01-01 – 1909-01-03	James M. Williams	Democratic	Cuyahoga
1909-01-04 – 1911-01-01	Nation O. Mather	Republican	Summit
1911-01-02 – 1915-01-03	William Green	Democratic	Coshocton
1915-01-04 – 1916-12-31	Charles John Howard	Republican	Belmont
1917-01-01 – 1919-01-05	J. H. Miller	Democratic	Licking
1919-01-06 – 1922-12-31	Frank E. Whittemore	Republican	Summit
1923-01-01 – 1925-01-04	George E. Kryder	Republican	Henry
1925-01-05 – 1927-01-02	Joseph R. Gardner	Republican	Hamilton
1927-01-03 – 1929-01-06	Chester C. Bolton	Republican	Cuyahoga
1929-01-07 – 1931-01-04	Allan G. Aigler	Republican	Sandusky
1931-01-05 – 1933-01-01	Earl R. Lewis	Republican	Belmont
1933-01-02 – 1935-01-06	D. H. DeArmond	Democratic	Hamilton
1935-01-07 – 1937-01-03	Paul P. Yoder	Democratic	Montgomery
1937-01-04 – 1939-01-01	Keith Lawrence	Democratic	Cuyahoga
1939-01-02 – 1949-01-02	Frank E. Whittemore (2nd)	Republican	Summit
1949-01-03 – 1950-12-31	Margaret A. Mahoney	Democratic	Cuyahoga
1951-01-01 – 1953-01-04	Roscoe R. Walcutt	Republican	Franklin
1953-01-05 – 1959-01-04	C. Stanley Mechem	Republican	Athens
1959-01-05 – 1961-01-01	Frank W. King	Democratic	Lucas
1961-01-02 – 1965-01-03	C. Stanley Mechem (2nd)	Republican	Athens
1965-01-04 – 1975-01-05	Theodore M. Gray	Republican	Miami
1975-01-06 – 1979-01-01	Oliver R. Ocasek	Democratic	Summit

== Presidents of the Ohio Senate, 1979–present ==
Term	Name	Party	Home county	District
1979 – 1981	Oliver R. Ocasek	Democratic	Summit	27th
1981 – 1983	Paul E. Gillmor	Republican	Ottawa	2nd
1983 – 1985	Harry Meshel	Democratic	Mahoning	33rd
1985 – 1989	Paul E. Gillmor (2nd)	Republican	Ottawa	2nd
1989 – 1997	Stanley J. Aronoff	Republican	Hamilton	8th
1997 – 2003	Richard Finan	Republican	Hamilton	7th
2003 – 2005	Doug White	Republican	Adams	14th
2005 – 2011	Bill Harris	Republican	Ashland	19th
2011 – 2013	Tom Niehaus	Republican	Clermont	14th
2013 – 2017	Keith Faber	Republican	Mercer	12th
2017 – 2020	Larry Obhof	Republican	Medina	22nd
2021 – 2024	Matt Huffman	Republican	Allen	12th
2025 – Present	Rob McColley	Republican	Henry	1st
Assuming office 2027	Bill Reineke	Republican	Seneca	26th

== See also ==
- List of Ohio state legislatures
