= Clyde Evans =

American politician (1938–2021)

Cylde Evans

Member of the Ohio House of Representatives from the 87th district
- In office January 3, 2003 – December 31, 2010
- Preceded by: John Carey
- Succeeded by: John Carey

Personal details
- Born: June 26, 1938 Rio Grande, Ohio
- Died: August 11, 2021 (aged 83) Gallipolis, Ohio
- Party: Republican
- Education: University of Southern Mississippi, Eastern Kentucky University, Union College
- Profession: Business, Educator

Clyde Evans (June 26, 1938 – August 11, 2021) was an American politician who served as a Republican member of the Ohio House of Representatives, who represented the 87th district from 2003 to 2010. Term limited in 2010, he ran for the Ohio Senate, but lost the primary election to David T. Daniels.

He died on August 11, 2021, in Gallipolis, Ohio, at age 83.
