= George Henry Chamberlain =

American lawyer

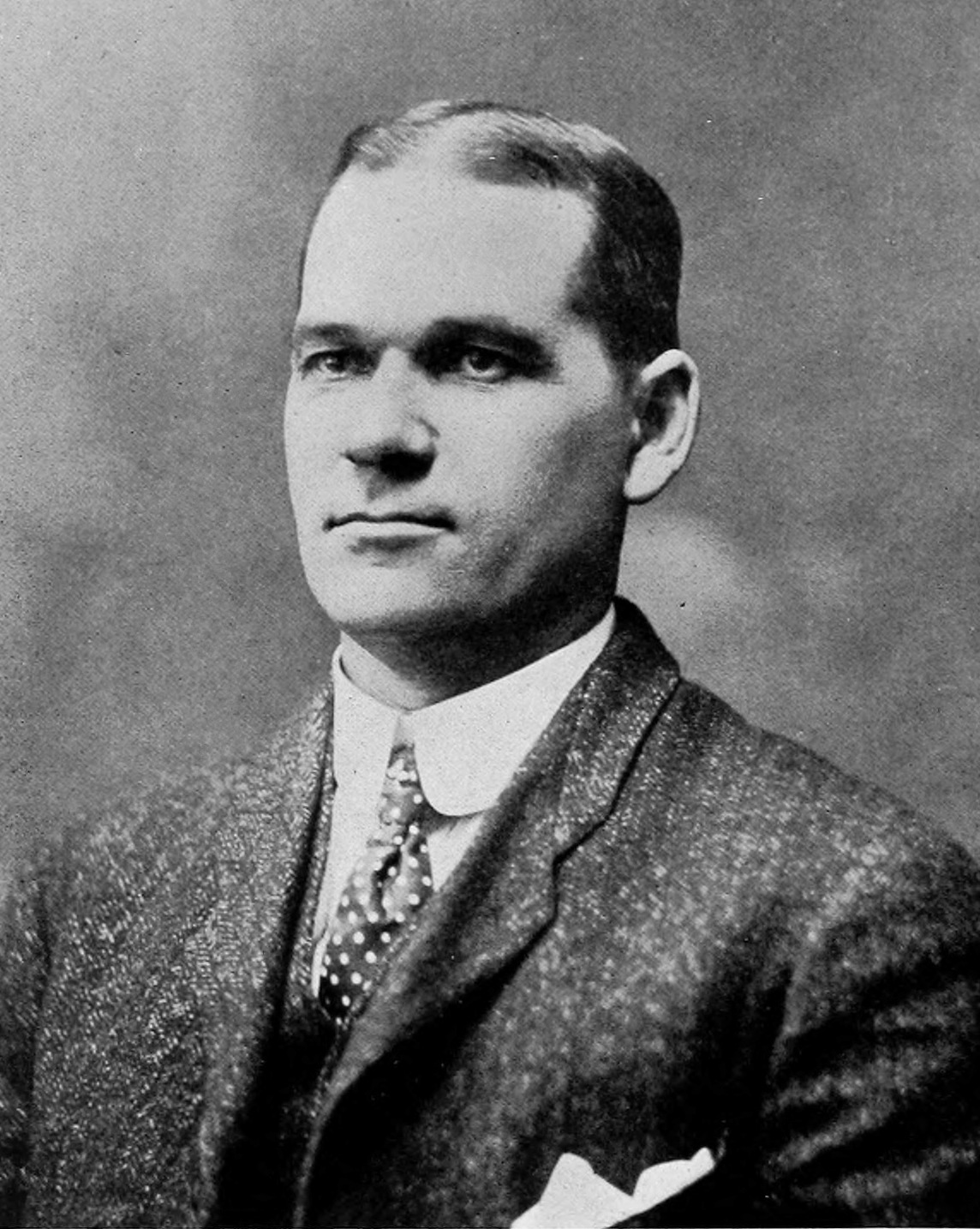

President of the Ohio Senate
- In office January 4, 1904 – December 31, 1905
- Preceded by: Frank B. Archer
- Succeeded by: James M. Williams

Personal details
- Born: June 21, 1862 Grafton Township, Lorain County, Ohio
- Died: March 3, 1943 (aged 80) Elyria, Ohio
- Resting place: Ridgelawn Cemetery, Elyria
- Party: Republican
- Spouses: Etta K. Mynderse; Ola Chamberlain
- Children: nine
- Education: Oberlin College
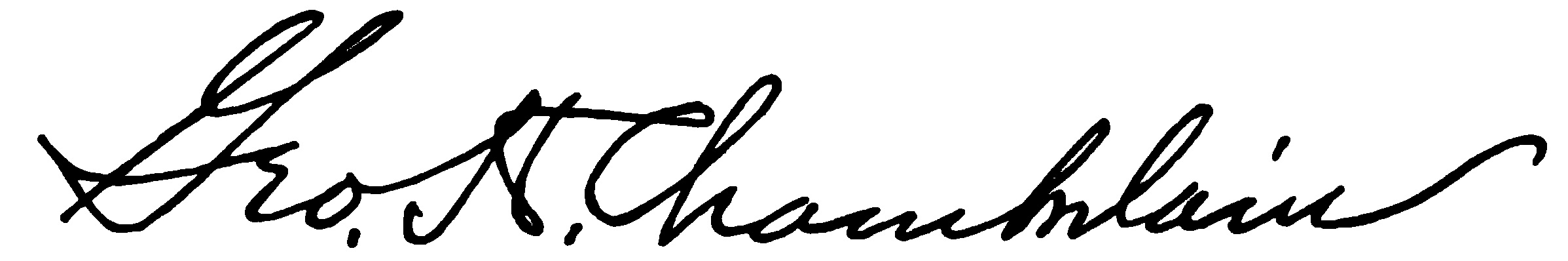
- Signature

George Henry Chamberlain (21 June 1862 – 3 March 1943) was a Republican politician and lawyer from Elyria, Ohio, United States. He was President of the Ohio State Senate during 1904 and 1905.

George H. Chamberlain was born June 21, 1862, in Grafton Township, Lorain County, Ohio. He was the son of George B. and Elizabeth (Cragin) Chamberlain. He remained on their farm until seventeen years old, and was educated at the district schools and Oberlin College. He taught school, read law in an office in Elyria, Ohio, and was admitted to the bar in 1887.

Chamberlain practiced law in Elyria for two years, and then moved to Milwaukee, Wisconsin, where he was engaged in insurance work until 1895. He returned to Elyria, in 1895, and was engaged in law and Republican politics. In 1896, he spoke in support of the presidential candidacy of William McKinley in Lorain County, and throughout the state.

Chamberlain was elected to the combined 27th-29th district of the Ohio State Senate, (Madison, Lorain, Richland and Ashland counties), for the 75th and 76th General Assemblies, (1902-1905). In the latter session, (1904 to 1905), he was President Pro Tempore of the Senate. In 1910, he was the Republican nominee for Ohio's 14th congressional district.

Chamberlain was on the Elyria board of education beginning in 1899, and was President of the Board after 1905. He was also president of the board of elections, and a member of the Elyria Chamber of Commerce.

Chamberlain married Etta K. Mynderse of LaGrange, Ohio, in June, 1883. They had nine children. After she died, his second wife was Ola Chamberlain. Chamberlain died at his Elyria home on March 3, 1943. He was buried at Ridgelawn Cemetery in Elyria.

== Notes ==
Ohio Senate
Preceded by Charles D. Wightman	Senator from 27th-29th District; 1902-1905	Succeeded by Frank N. Patterson
