= Youngstown Historical Center of Industry and Labor =

Labor museum in Youngstown, Ohio

Coordinates: 41.102533°N 80.651417°W

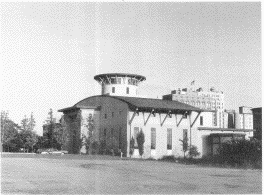
The Youngstown Historical Center of Industry and Labor

The Youngstown Historical Center of Industry and Labor, located in Youngstown, Ohio, preserves the history of the steel industry that dominated the Youngstown area's economic life for much of the 20th century. The museum is owned by the Ohio History Connection and operated by Youngstown State University. The facility, which was designed by noted architect Michael Graves, is reminiscent of a steel mill, complete with stylized smoke stacks.

== Origins ==
A museum to commemorate the community's declining steel industry was first proposed by Ohio State Senator Harry Meshel in 1977, and a planning office was opened in downtown Youngstown the following year. In 1983, $3 million in state funding was approved for the project. A groundbreaking ceremony was held in 1986. Construction began in 1989 headed by Graves and the Raymond J. Jaminet Partners firm. The center opened with temporary exhibits in 1990. The museum established a permanent collection and was officially dedicated in 1992.

== Current operations ==
The center's permanent exhibit, titled "By the Sweat of Their Brow: Forging the Steel Valley," examines the community's industrial past using video, photographs, artifacts, and reconstructed scenes. Despite its focus on Youngstown's former staple industry, the center has faced difficulties related to low patronage. Until recently, the center enjoyed low visibility among residents of the Mahoning Valley, and some observers pointed to the center's hours of operation, which do not make the facility accessible to working residents. Nevertheless, the OHS continues to support the Youngstown Historical Center of Industry and Labor, which has survived rumors of imminent closure. Site manager Nancy Haraburda indicated that more than 8,000 people visited the center in the 2006–2007 fiscal year, an increase of 800 people over the previous fiscal year.
