= Cliff Rosenberger =

American politician (born 1981)

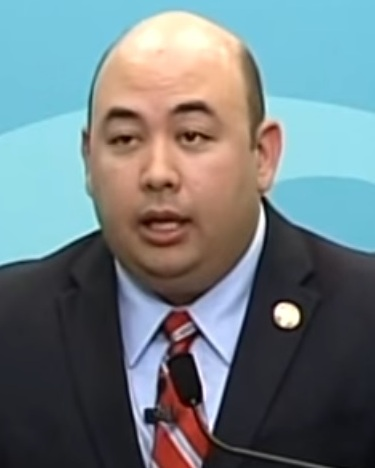

102nd Speaker of the Ohio House of Representatives
- In office January 5, 2015 – April 12, 2018
- Preceded by: William Batchelder
- Succeeded by: Kirk Schuring (Acting)

Member of the Ohio House of Representatives from the 91st district
- In office January 3, 2011 – April 12, 2018
- Preceded by: David Daniels
- Succeeded by: Shane Wilkin

Personal details
- Born: April 23, 1981 (age 45) Wilmington, Ohio, U.S.
- Party: Republican
- Education: Wright State University (BA)

Cliff Rosenberger (born April 23, 1981) is a former American politician who was a Republican member of the Ohio House of Representatives, serving the 91st District from 2011 until 2018. He was Speaker of the House from 2015 until 2018. It was announced that Kirk Schuring would take over as the interim speaker. Rosenberger represented a large southern Ohio district that includes Wilmington, Hillsboro and Waverly.

On April 10, 2018, he announced he would resign effective May 1, 2018 amid an FBI investigation of his "lavish lifestyle" and "relationships with lobbyists and donors." On April 12, 2018, Rosenberger announced he was immediately resigning.

== Life and career ==
His mother is South Korean, his father having met her while stationed in South Korea. Following high school, Rosenberger enlisted in the U.S. Air Force, where he served with the Air National Guard. During his service, he also worked in the White House. In his civilian work, he has been a political events coordinator for Mitt Romney's presidential campaign, as well as a special assistant to the U.S. Secretary of the Interior.

Rosenberger resides in Clarksville, Ohio.

== Ohio House of Representatives ==
In 2010, Representative David T. Daniels was term limited and unable to run for another term in the Ohio House of Representatives. Rosenberger opted to replace him, and was elected in the 2010 general election with 59.46% of the vote.

Rosenberger was sworn into his first term on January 3, 2011. Prior to being selected Speaker, he served on the committees of Economic and Small Business Development; Finance and Appropriations and its Higher Education Subcommittee (as Chair); Public Utilities; and Veterans Affairs. In 2012, Rosenberger was elected to a second term with 61.76% of the vote over Democrat Peter Pence.

As a member of the Ohio Controlling Board, Rosenberger opposed an item that would fund Medicaid expansion in the state. He was replaced on the board for the item to pass through, at the direction of Governor John Kasich. He has also been critical of President Barack Obama's plan to offer free tuition for community college students for two years.

Rosenberger was unopposed for a third term in 2014. For the 131st Ohio General Assembly, Rosenberger has been named Speaker of the House. He is believed to be the youngest person to ever hold that role. Rosenberger presided over the largest Republican majority in nearly fifty years. In his inaugural address, he stated that government should stay out of people’s lives, adding “We are not the creator of jobs, but only the means to help foster them."

On April 10, 2018 Rosenberger announced his resignation from office as the Ohio House Speaker. Rosenberger was the first Ohio House speaker to resign in more than 50 years. The resignation follows reports of FBI inquiries into Public Corruption.

== Issues ==
Rosenberger supports the right to bear firearms. He received an "A" rating and endorsement from the NRA Political Victory Fund, along with an endorsement for his re-election from the Buckeye Firearms Association.

Political offices
Preceded by William Batchelder	Speaker of the Ohio House of Representatives; 2015–2018	Succeeded by Kirk Schuring; Acting
