= Arthur L. Peterson =

American educator and politician (1926–2023)

Member of the Montana House of Representatives from the 10th district
- In office January 3, 2001 – January 6, 2003
- Preceded by: Royal Johnson
- Succeeded by: Donald Roberts

5th President of Thunderbird School of Global Management
- In office 1966 – 1969
- Preceded by: Carl A. Sauer
- Succeeded by: Robert F. Delaney

Member of the Wisconsin State Assembly from the Pierce County district
- In office January 1, 1951 – January 3, 1955
- Preceded by: Selmer W. Gunderson
- Succeeded by: district abolished

Personal details
- Born: June 27, 1926 Glyndon, Minnesota, U.S.
- Died: March 22, 2023 (aged 96) Sun City, California, U.S.
- Party: Republican
- Spouse: Connie L. Peterson
- Children: 4, including Jon
- Education: Yale University (BS); University of Southern California (MS); University of Minnesota (PhD)

Academic work
- Institutions: University of Wisconsin; Ohio Wesleyan University; Thunderbird School of Global Management; Pepperdine University

Arthur Laverne Peterson (June 27, 1926 – March 22, 2023) was an American educator and politician.

== Life and career ==
Peterson was born in Glyndon, Minnesota on June 27, 1926. He served in the United States Marine Corps during the Korean War. In 1947, he graduated from Yale University. He then received his master's degree from the University of Southern California in 1949. In 1962, he received his doctorate in philosophy from the University of Minnesota. He lived in Prescott, Wisconsin and worked for Eaton Plumbing and Heating. From 1951 to 1955, Peterson served in the Wisconsin Assembly and was a Republican. He taught political science at University of Wisconsin–Eau Claire and Ohio Wesleyan University.

In 1966, Peterson accepted the position of President at Thunderbird School of Global Management, then known as the American Institute for Foreign Trade. During his time at Thunderbird, Peterson would land his own personal plane at the campus which was once a WWII-era airfield. By the time of his departure to Pepperdine University in 1969, Peterson had helped Thunderbird achieve accreditation through the North Central Association of Colleges and Schools.

In 1989, Peterson taught political science at Rocky Mountain College in Billings, Montana.

He served in the Montana House of Representatives from 2000 to 2002 as a Republican. Peterson later lived in Billings, Montana.

Peterson was a candidate for California’s 39th congressional district, but he lost the primary.

Peterson died in Sun City, California on March 22, 2023, at the age of 96.

== Notable works ==
Peterson, Arthur L. "McCarthyism: Its Ideology and Foundations." PhD Diss., University of Minnesota, 1962.
