= Dennis Stapleton =

American politician

Member of the Ohio House of Representatives from the 88th district
- In office April 16, 1996-December 31, 2002
- Preceded by: Doug White
- Succeeded by: David T. Daniels

Personal details
- Party: Republican

Dennis Stapleton is a former representative of the Ohio House of Representatives and former Delaware County Commissioner in Delaware County, Ohio. His district encompassed all of Adams, Fayette, Highland and Pike Counties. He served from 1996-2003 when he was succeeded by David T. Daniels.

== Early life ==
Dennis R. Stapleton was born 23 July 1950 in Wilmington, Oh.

Dennis Stapleton entered the insurance industry as in May 1979 in Washington Court House, Fayette County, Ohio. While working in the insurance industry he earned a bachelor's degree in communications from the University of Dayton in 1986 graduating magna cum laude. In 1988 he became the owner/operator of Buckeye Theatre's Inc. in Chillicothe, Ohio and Middletown, Ohio. The theatre's were sold in 1998. He would retire as President of the Stapleton-Pool Insurance Agency in January 2000.

== Later career ==
Stapleton was appointed to the Ohio House for the 88th District on April 16, 1996 filling the seat previous occupied by Doug White who had been appointed to the Ohio Senate. During his tenure in the Ohio House of Representatives Stapleton served as chairman of the Ohio House Insurance Committee, Chairman of the Finance Sub-Committee for Agriculture and Economic Development and as a member of committees for Education, Financial Institutions, Agriculture, Natural Resources, Local Government, and Economic & Workforce Development. Stapleton left the House in 2003 due to term limits and was succeeded by David T. Daniels.

Following the end of his term in the Ohio House, Stapleton was appointed the Assistant Director for Life, Health, Managed Care and Annuities at the Ohio Department of Insurance by then Governor Bob Taft. He would serve as Assistant Director until June 2004 when he became the Director of Government Relations for the Ohio Consumer's Council.

Stapleton left government service in August 2008 joining CPM Government Relations, Ltd. as their Director of Government Relations. While at CPM he became a county commissioner in Delaware County, Ohio in November 2010. He would serve as commissioner until December 2014 when he chose not to run for re-election. In January 2013, during his term in the commissioner's office he would leave CPM Government Relations, Ltd. In September 2014 he became the Vice-President of Commercial Insurance for Huntington Insurance a division of Huntington Bancshares.

In addition to his roles in government and private enterprise, Stapleton also served as a financial advisor for H. D. Vest Financial Services from May 2005 until his retirement in May 2018.

== Education ==
Stapleton earned his B.A. degree in Communications from the University of Dayton in 1986 with an emphasis in Broadcast Communications. While there he was a member of Alpha Epsilon Rho National Honorary Fraternity. He also attended Capital University Law School and the Ohio State University

== Personal life ==
Stapleton married the former Katie Jamison on 3 July 1974. The couple have two children.

Stapleton was a member of the Fayette County Chamber of Commerece and served as President of the Washington Court House Rotary Club.
