= Jon Peterson (politician) =

American politician (1953–2019)

Member of the Ohio House of Representatives from the 2nd district
- In office January 5, 1999 – December 31, 2008
- Preceded by: Joan Lawrence
- Succeeded by: Kris Jordan

Personal details
- Born: Jon Martin Peterson II; October 25, 1953 Prescott, Wisconsin
- Died: October 10, 2019 (aged 65) Tennessee
- Party: Republican
- Spouse: Melissa Peterson
- Children: Emily and Hannah
- Parent: Arthur L. Peterson (father)
- Profession: Delaware County Treasurer

Jon Peterson was a former Republican member of the Ohio House of Representatives, representing the 2nd District from 1999 to 2008. Peterson served as Delaware County Auditor, and also Delaware County Treasurer.

In 2020, a memorial plaza in Delaware was named in his honor.
