= Harry Malott =

American politician (1917–1996)

Harry Mallott

Member of the Ohio House of Representatives from the 87th district
- In office January 5, 1973 – December 31, 1990
- Preceded by: Bill Mussey
- Succeeded by: Doug White

Personal details
- Born: Harry C. Mallot; June 11, 1917 Clermont County, Ohio, United States
- Died: January 28, 1996 (aged 78) Batavia, Ohio, United States
- Party: Democratic

Harry C. "Bud" Malott (June 11, 1917 – January 28, 1996) was a member of the Ohio House of Representatives, representing Clermont County from 1973 to 1990. He died in 1996 at the age of 78.
