= Rose Vesper =

American politician (1937–2018)

Member of the Ohio House of Representatives from the 72nd district
- In office January 3, 1993 – December 31, 2000
- Preceded by: District Established
- Succeeded by: Tom Niehaus

Personal details
- Born: October 4, 1937 Cincinnati, Ohio, U.S.
- Died: December 4, 2018 (aged 81) New Richmond, Ohio, U.S.
- Party: Republican

Rose Vesper (October 4, 1937 – December 4, 2018) was an American politician and member of the Ohio House of Representatives from 1993–2000 for the 72nd district, a portion of Clermont County, Ohio. She was succeeded by Tom Niehaus at the beginning of 2001.

== Early life ==
Vesper was born in Cincinnati, Ohio. She obtained a Bachelor of Arts from Xavier University and a Master of Arts from Midwestern University. She worked as a school teacher from 1984 to 1992.

Before entering and during her term in public office Vesper ran her own farm, growing tobacco, alfalfa, and cattle. Due to her experience and interest in farming tobacco, Vesper was a member of an Ohio "Tobacco Settlement Task Force" in 1999.

== Public career ==
Vesper entered public office as a member of the Ohio parliament on 3 January 1993.

In 2001, Vesper was nominated as Ohio's regional economic development representative by then governor, Bob Taft.

In 2002, Vesper won the Matha Dorsey Award for economic achievement. Vesper died on December 4, 2018, at the age of 81.
