= George E. Kryder =

American politician (1872–1953)

George Elmer Kryder
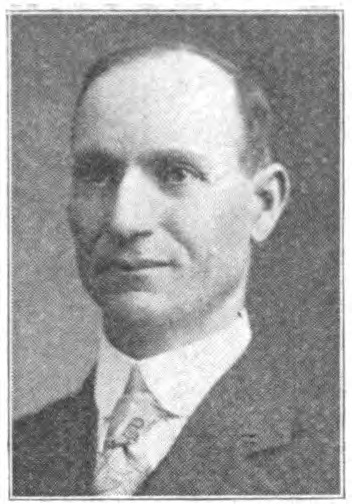

President of the Ohio Senate
- In office January 1, 1923 – January 4, 1925
- Preceded by: Frank E. Whittemore
- Succeeded by: Joseph R. Gardner

Personal details
- Born: February 10, 1872 McClure, Ohio, US
- Died: November 13, 1953 (aged 81) Ohio, US
- Resting place: Olive Branch Cemetery, McClure
- Party: Republican
- Spouse: Gertrude Hartman
- Children: five
- Education: Ohio Normal University

George E. Kryder was a Republican politician from Henry County, Ohio. He was President of the Ohio Senate in 1923 and 1924.

George E. Kryder was born February 10, 1872, near McClure, Ohio. He was the son of George Kryder and Elizabeth Sweetland Kryder. He attended the common schools and Ohio Normal University.

Kryder taught school for six years, and then became a farmer and breeder of registered Jersey cattle. He was elected as a Republican to the Ohio's 33rd senatorial district, (Fulton, Hancock, Henry, Putnam and Wood Counties), for the 83rd Ohio General Assembly, (1919-1920). He was re-elected to the 84th, (1921-1922), and 85th General Assemblies, (1923-1924), and was President Pro-Tem of the 85th.

Kryder was married with five children. He was a member of the Knights of Pythias and Modern Woodmen of America. He died November 13, 1953, in Ohio.

== Notes ==
Ohio Senate
Preceded by Frank W. Thomas	Senator from 33rd district 1919-1924	Succeeded by R. A. Powell
