= Bill Harris (Ohio politician) =

American politician

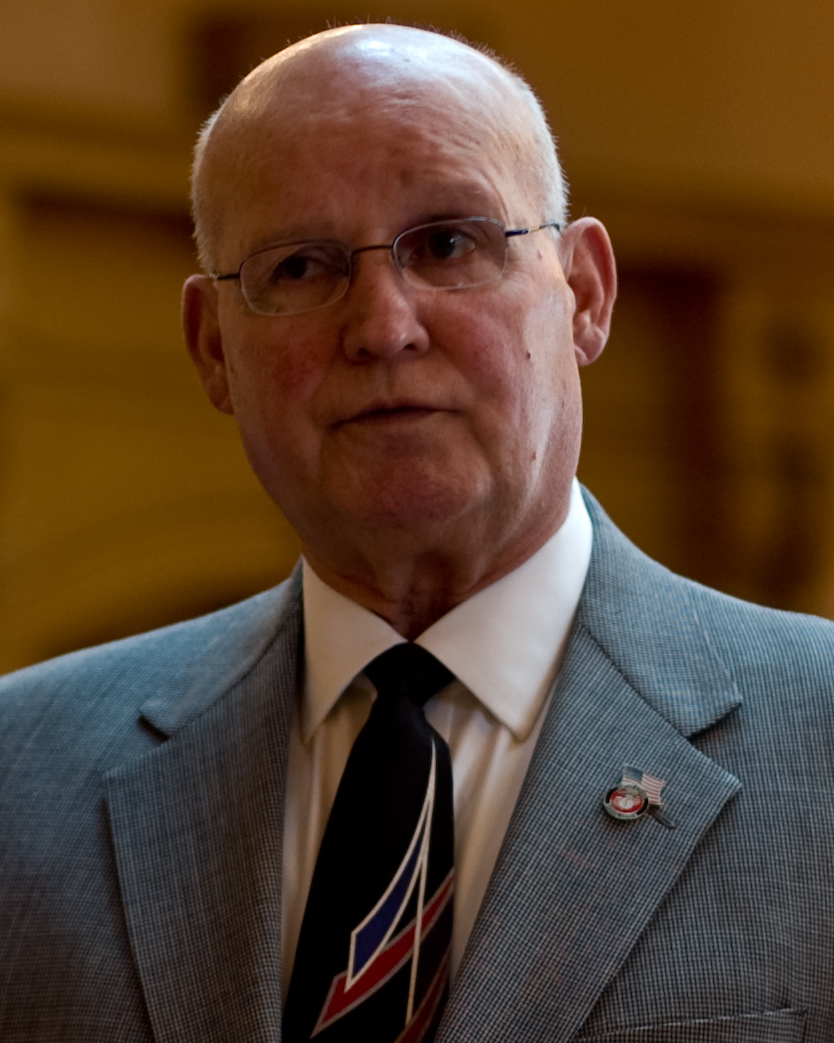
- Harris in March 2008

92nd President of the Ohio Senate
- In office January 3, 2005 – December 31, 2010
- Preceded by: Doug White
- Succeeded by: Tom Niehaus

Member of the Ohio Senate from the 19th district
- In office August 15, 2000 – December 31, 2010
- Preceded by: Dick Schafrath
- Succeeded by: Kris Jordan

Member of the Ohio House of Representatives from the 93rd district
- In office January 3, 1995 – August 15, 2000
- Preceded by: Eugene Byers
- Succeeded by: Thom Collier

Personal details
- Born: September 1, 1934 Fork Mountain, Tennessee, U.S.
- Died: November 27, 2017 (aged 83) Ashland, Ohio, U.S.
- Party: Republican
- Spouse: Mary Cay
- Profession: Military, Small Business Owner

Bill Harris (September 1, 1934 – November 27, 2017) was a Republican politician, who served in the Ohio General Assembly, notably as President of the Ohio Senate from 2005 to 2010.

== Life and career ==
Originally from Tennessee, Harris earned his B.A. in Secondary Education from the University of Arizona. A former U.S. Marine, Harris served in the Korean War as a machine gunner and a platoon commander. After Korea he attended the US Army Counterintelligence School, and then served the remainder of his 23-year career with the USMC as an intelligence and counterintelligence officer, serving two tours of duty in Vietnam. Following his time in the military, Harris moved to Ashland, Ohio, where he began a career as an automotive dealer. He would own one of the largest Chevrolet and General Motors dealership networks in Northern Ohio.

In 1995, Harris sought an open seat in the Ohio House of Representatives in a Republican district. He won easily, and began his first term on January 3, 1995. He won reelection in 1996. By 1997, Harris was serving as majority whip of the House. He won reelection in 1998.

The Ohio Senate announced Harris' death on November 27, 2017.

== Ohio Senate ==
While Harris was seen as a potential Speaker of the House in 2000, a vacant seat in the Ohio Senate changed his political future. In summer of 2000, Senator Dick Schafrath resigned from his seat before facing term limits in 2002. Harris was appointed to the seat. He was seated in the upper chamber on August 15, 2000, and resigned from his House seat on the same day.

Harris won a full term to the Senate in 2000, facing minimal opposition, and served as Chairman of the Senate Finance Committee, one of the more powerful chairmanships in the legislature. In late 2004, ongoing disputes between Senators Randy Gardner and Jeff Jacobson, who were both vying to be the next President of the Senate, left President Doug White's successor unnamed. Both dropped out of the running, leaving darkhorse candidate Harris to take the top position in the Senate in 2005. He served in the capacity for three General Assemblies, or six years. Harris easily won a second term in 2006.

By 2010, Harris was term limited, and after fifteen years, left the legislature. He was succeeded in the Senate by Kris Jordan, and as President of the Senate by Tom Niehaus. Following his time as a legislator, Harris returned to Ashland County and retired. He died November 27, 2017.
