= Oscar Sheppard =

American politician

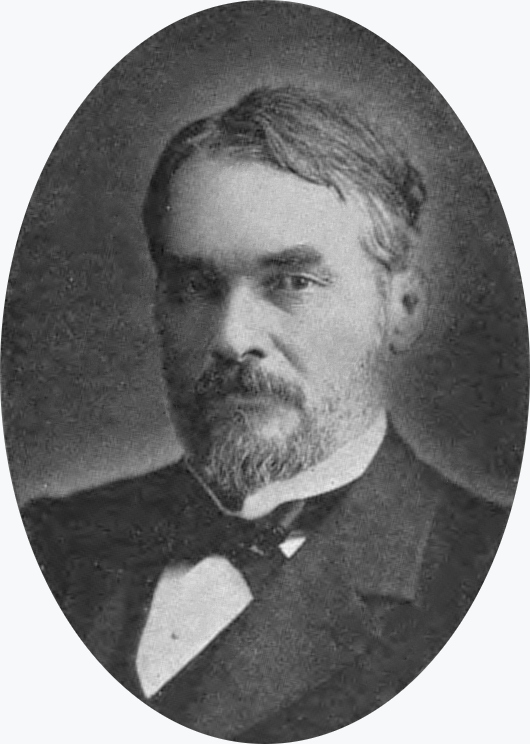

President of the Ohio Senate
- In office January 1, 1900 – January 5, 1902
- Preceded by: Thaddeus E. Cromley
- Succeeded by: Frank B. Archer

Personal details
- Born: July 15, 1845 Muskingum County, Ohio
- Died: October 24, 1922 (aged 77) West Alexandria, Ohio
- Resting place: Fairview Cemetery
- Party: Republican
- Spouse: Alice Cary Gale
- Children: three
- Education: National Normal University

Oscar Sheppard (15 July 1845 – 24 October 1922) was a politician from West Alexandria, Ohio, United States. He was a member of the Ohio House of Representatives and Ohio State Senate, serving as president pro tempore of the Senate at the turn of the twentieth century.

== Early life and war service ==
Oscar Sheppard was born in Muskingum County, Ohio on July 15, 1845, son of Lenox Sheppard, a native of Westmoreland County, Pennsylvania, and Ellen McLain Sheppard, originally from Muskingum County. At age sixteen, he enlisted as a private in Company C of the 27th Ohio Infantry early in the American Civil War. He participated in all the battles of the Army of the Tennessee, was severely wounded at the Battle of Atlanta on July 22, 1864, and was present at the surrender of Johnston at the close of the war. He participated in the Grand Review of the Armies, and was mustered out as sergeant-major of his regiment in July 1865 at Louisville, Kentucky.

== Post war ==
From 1866 to 1868, Sheppard attended Newark High School during winters while working for contractors and bridge-builders during the summer. He entered National Normal University at Lebanon, Ohio in 1868, and taught and attended university until 1872. He was elected principal of West Alexandria, Ohio school in 1872, and continued as such until 1879. He studied law, and was admitted to the bar in May, 1877. He began practice of law in 1879.

In 1881 and 1883, Sheppard was elected to the Ohio House of Representatives from Preble County. From 1884 to 1887, he was interested in the building of the Cincinnati, Jackson and Mackinaw Railroad, and was a member of the board of directors for several years. He was also a member of the Board of Trustees of the Dayton State Hospital from 1891 to 1897.

In 1897, Sheppard was elected as a Republican to the Ohio State Senate from the third district. He was re-elected in 1899, and with his party in the majority, was chosen as president pro tempore for the 1900-1901 session. He also served on several committees.

== Personal ==
Oscar Sheppard was married in 1878 to Alice Cary Gale, and had one son and two daughters. He died at West Alexandria on October 24, 1922, and was buried at Fairview Cemetery.

== Notes ==
Ohio House of Representatives
Preceded by D. C. Stubbs	Representative from Preble County; 1882-1885	Succeeded by Andrew L. Harris
Ohio Senate
Preceded by William E. Sparks	Senator from 3rd District; 1898-1901	Succeeded by Philo G. Burnham
