= Bill Mussey =

American politician

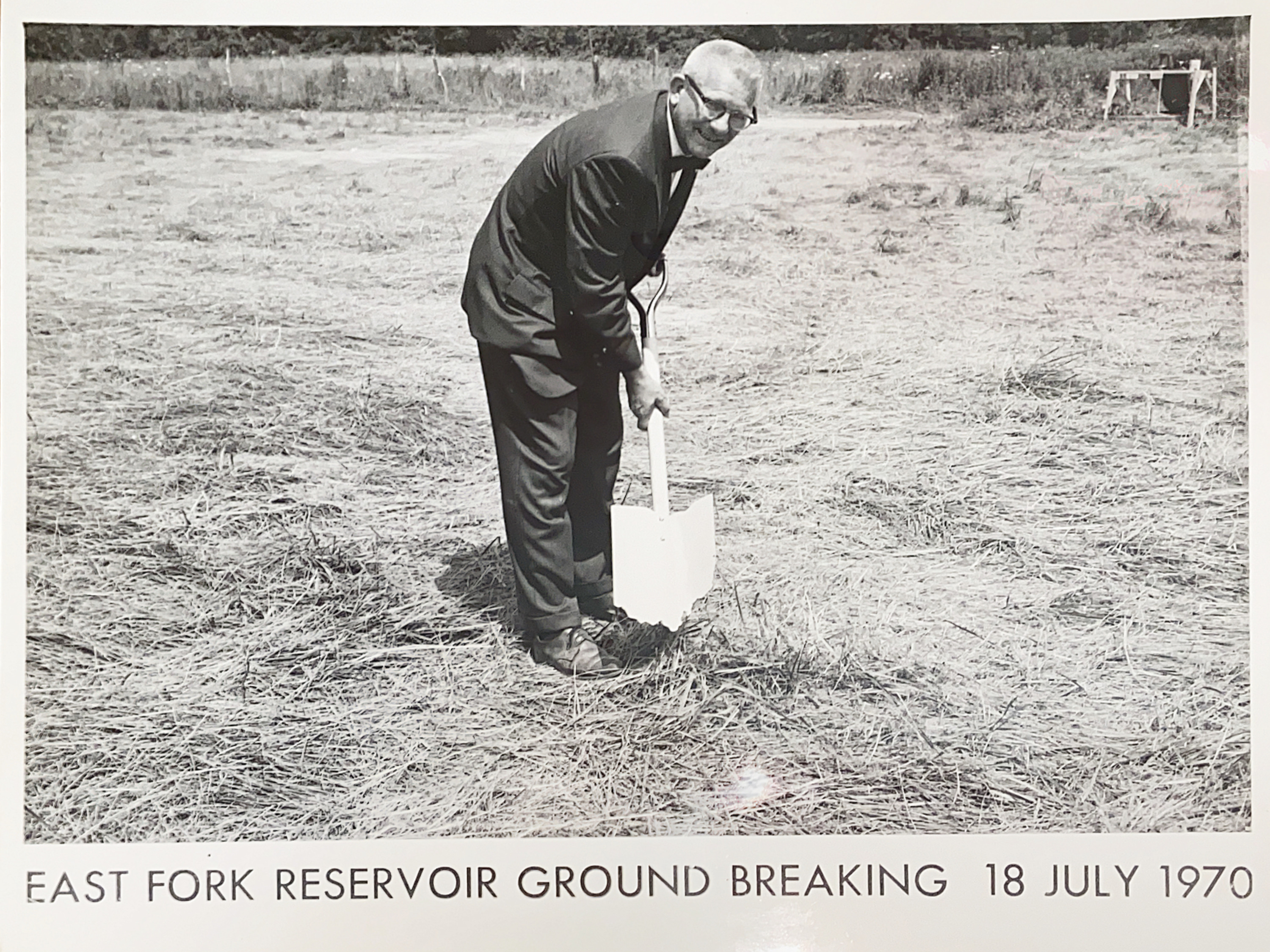

Member of the Ohio Senate from the 14th district
- In office January 3, 1973-March 30, 1979
- Preceded by: Oakley C. Collins
- Succeeded by: Cooper Snyder

Member of the Ohio House of Representatives from the 12th district
- In office January 3, 1967-December 31, 1972
- Preceded by: District Created
- Succeeded by: Harry Mallott

Personal details
- Born: August 24, 1913 Illinois, United States
- Died: May 12, 2000 (aged 86) Gallipolis, Ohio, United States
- Party: Republican

William Howard Mussey (August 24, 1913 – May 12, 2000) was a Republican politician who formerly served in the Ohio General Assembly. A native of Batavia, Ohio and a former reporter, Mussey initially won election to the Ohio House of Representatives in 1966, following redistricting because of the Voting Rights Act of 1965. He was reelected in 1968, and 1970.

In 1972, Mussey opted to move to the Ohio Senate, following another redistricting process that left incumbent Senator Oakley Collins out of the district. He went on to win the seat, and was sworn in on January 3, 1973. He won reelection to the seat in 1976.

By 1979, Mussey had been chosen by Ohio Governor Jim Rhodes to serve on the Ohio Industrial Commission, and resigned on March 30, after serving as a legislator for over twelve years. He was replaced by Cooper Snyder. He would serve on the commission for a portion of the 1980s, before retiring to Columbus, Ohio.
