= Joe Uecker =

American politician

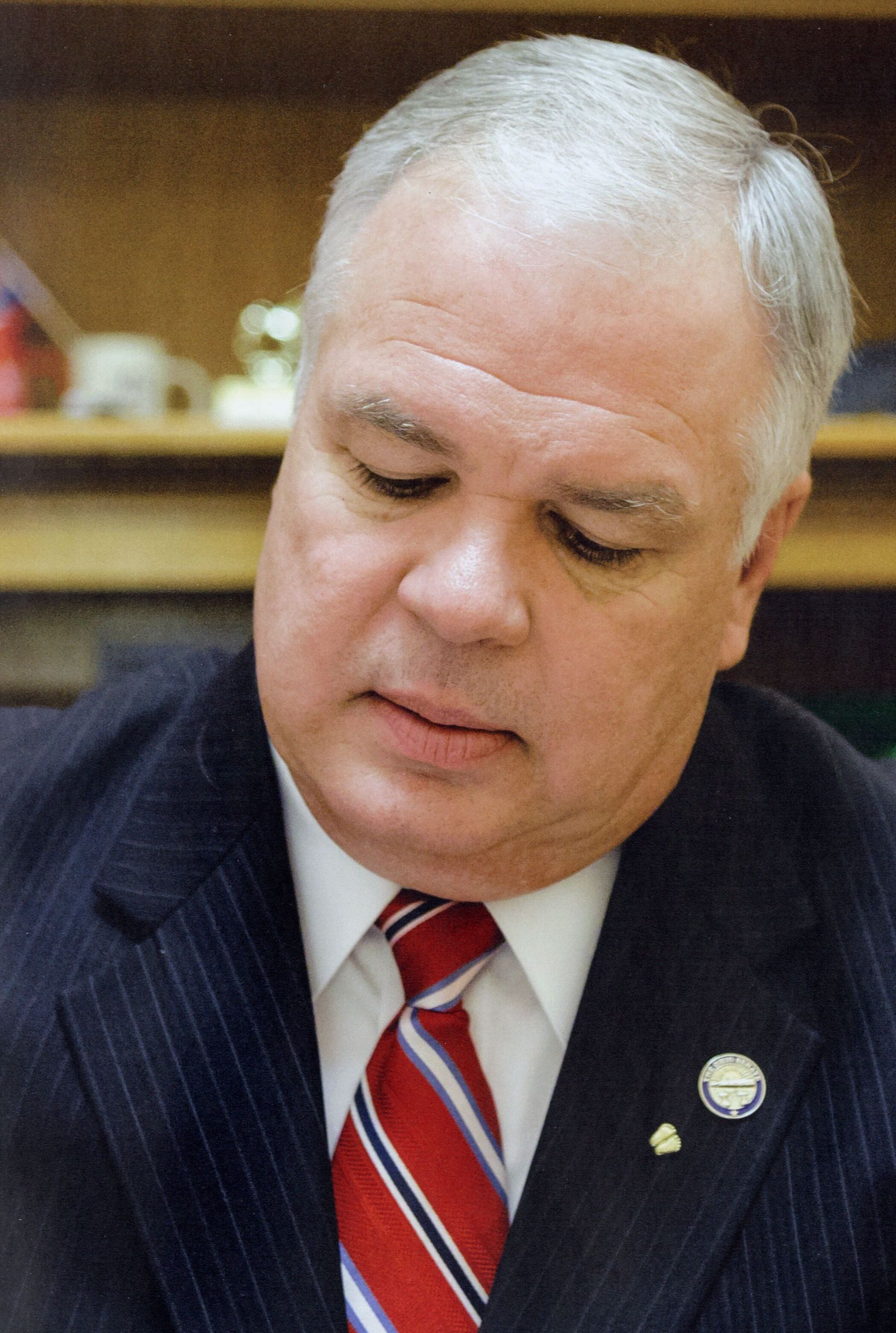

Member of the Ohio Senate from the 14th district
- In office January 7, 2013–August 31, 2019
- Preceded by: Tom Niehaus
- Succeeded by: Terry Johnson

Member of the Ohio House of Representatives from the 66th district
- In office January 3, 2005-December 31, 2012
- Preceded by: Jean Schmidt
- Succeeded by: John Becker

Personal details
- Born: November 27, 1954 (age 71) Cincinnati, Ohio, U.S.
- Party: Republican
- Education: Moeller High School, University of Cincinnati, Northern Kentucky University
- Profession: Sales, Business Owner, Law Enforcement

Joe Uecker (born November 27, 1954) is a former Republican member of the Ohio Senate, who represented the 14th District from 2013 to 2019. He formerly served in the Ohio House of Representatives from 2005 to 2012.

== Career ==
Uecker worked in law enforcement for the City of Deer Park, Clermont County Sheriff's Office, and the City of Montgomery before parlaying his management degree into the private sector in 1988. He also co-owned a private business for three years. Uecker worked as the Administrator of the Clermont County Engineer's Office from 1993 until 2004 and was also a Miami Township Trustee from 1990 until 2004.

When incumbent Jean Schmidt decided to run for the Ohio Senate, Uecker was one of five who ran for her open House seat. He won with 40.26% of the electorate. He ran unopposed in the general election, and began his term in 2005.

In 2006, he won a second term against Democrat William Newby with 63.59% of the vote, and again ran unopposed for a third term in 2008. For a final term in 2010, Uecker defeated Libertarian Barry Cox with 79.94% of the vote.

== Ohio Senate ==
In 2012, Uecker was term limited from the Ohio House of Representatives and opted to run for an open seat in the Ohio Senate. He won a four way primary with 42.37% of the vote. He was unopposed in the general election. Uecker resigned on August 31, 2019 to take a position with the Ohio Department of Transportation (ODOT).
