= Frank B. Archer =

American politician

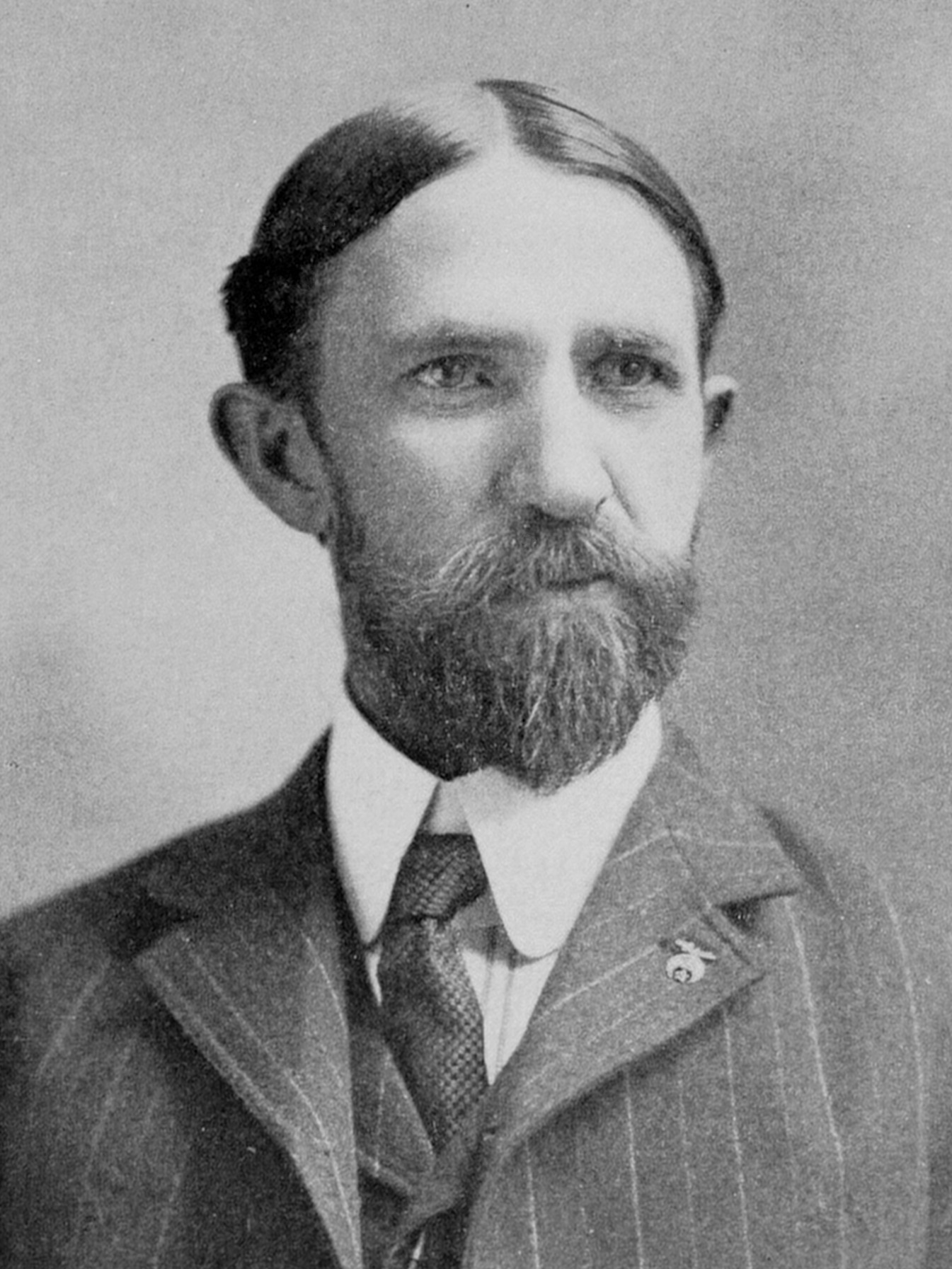

President of the Ohio Senate
- In office January 6, 1902 – January 3, 1904
- Preceded by: Oscar Sheppard
- Succeeded by: George Henry Chamberlain

Personal details
- Born: May 20, 1858 Bellaire, Ohio
- Died: December 11, 1914 (aged 56) Bellaire, Ohio
- Party: Republican
- Spouse: Lucy F. Horn
- Children: five

Frank B. Archer (20 May 1858 – 11 December 1914) was a politician from Bellaire, Ohio, United States. He was president pro tem of the Ohio State Senate from 1902 to 1904.

== Early life ==
Frank B. Archer was born in Bellaire, Ohio, on May 5, 1858. His father died that autumn, and his mother, with six children, was thrown into poverty. He began working in a glass factory at age 12, and by age 17 he had finished his apprenticeship and was a master tradesman.

== Political career ==
In 1884, Archer left the factory to pursue the stationery and insurance business. Two years before that, he had begun his political career by being elected treasurer of Pultney Township. He served two terms on the city council of Bellaire, and was president of that body for two years. He was elected treasurer of Belmont County in 1889 and was re-elected. He was twice Chairman of the Belmont County Republican Executive Committee.

Archer was elected to the Ohio State Senate from the 20th and 22nd districts, and was re-elected in 1901. He was elected as president pro tem for the sessions in 1902 and 1903.

== Personal ==
Frank B. Archer married Lucy F. Horn. They had four sons and a daughter. He was a member of the Masonic and Knights of Pythias fraternal organizations. He died December 11, 1914, at Bellaire.
