= Joan Lawrence =

American politician

Member of the Ohio House of Representatives from the 80th district
- In office January 3, 1983 – December 31, 2000
- Preceded by: Charles R. Saxbe
- Succeeded by: Jon Peterson

Personal details
- Born: 1931 or 1932 (age 94–95)
- Party: Republican

Joan W. Lawrence was a member of the Ohio House of Representatives from 1983–2000. Her district consisted of a portion of Delaware County, Ohio. She was succeeded by Jon Peterson.
