= Doug White (politician) =

American politician

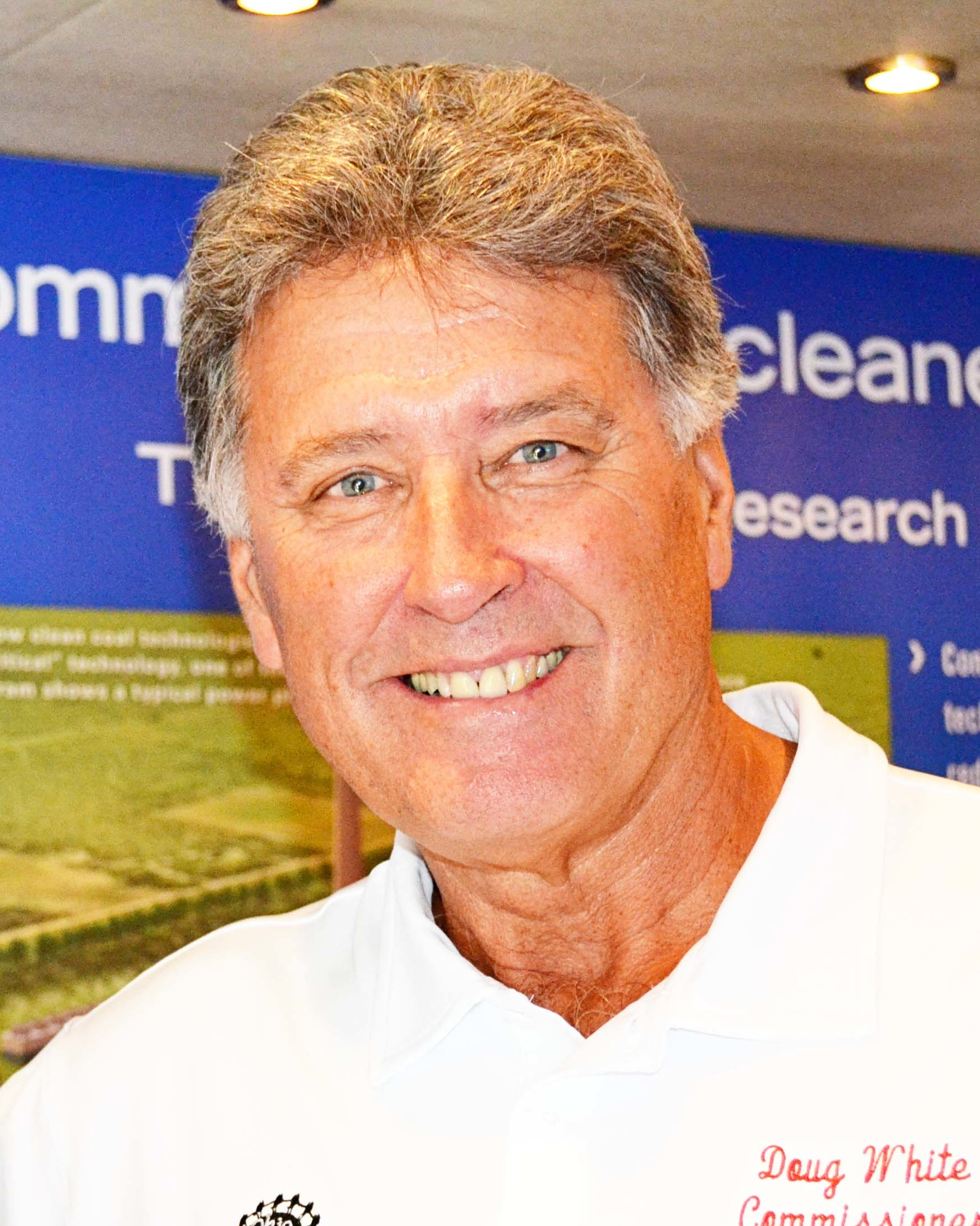

91st President of the Ohio Senate
- In office January 3, 2003 – December 31, 2004
- Preceded by: Richard Finan
- Succeeded by: Bill Harris

Member of the Ohio Senate from the 14th district
- In office April 16, 1996 – December 31, 2004
- Preceded by: Cooper Snyder
- Succeeded by: Tom Niehaus

Member of the Ohio House of Representatives from the 88th district
- In office January 5, 1991 – April 15, 1996
- Preceded by: Harry Mallott
- Succeeded by: Dennis Stapleton

Personal details
- Born: 1943 (age 82–83) Adams County, Ohio, U.S.
- Party: Republican
- Spouse: Shirley White
- Education: Ohio State University

Military service
- Allegiance: United States
- Branch/service: United States Army
- Years of service: 1964–1966
- Battles/wars: Vietnam War

Doug White of Manchester, Ohio, is an American politician of the Republican Party who was president of the Ohio Senate for two years, from 2003 to 2005.

An Adams County Commissioner from 1985-1990, White opted to run against the Democrat Harry Mallott in 1990 for a seat in the Ohio House of Representatives. He was successful in his run, and was seated in 1991. He won re-election in 1992 and 1994.

By 1996, Senator Cooper Snyder announced his retirement from the Ohio Senate after 17 years. Subsequently, White announced his candidacy for the seat. Ultimately Snyder resigned early, allowing the Senate Republicans to appoint White to the seat early, which they did.

After the 2002 elections, the Republicans of the Ohio Senate selected White to succeed Richard Finan as leader of the party. By 2004, however, White had already served two terms in the Senate and Ohio's term limits law prevented him from running again. Thus, in the 2004 election, Tom Niehaus took White's seat and Bill Harris was chosen to be the next Senate president.

After his service in the Senate, White was director of the Ohio Department of Commerce in the cabinet of Republican Bob Taft.
