= John C. Hutsinpiller =

American politician (1840–1927)

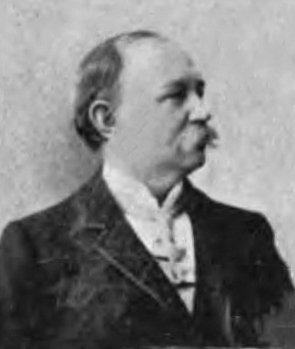

Member of the Ohio Senate from the eighth district
- In office January 3, 1894 – January 2, 1898
- Preceded by: J. L. Carpenter
- Succeeded by: J. L. Carpenter

Personal details
- Born: December 11, 1840 Gallia County, Ohio, US
- Died: June 20, 1927 (aged 86) Gallipolis, Ohio, US
- Resting place: Mound Hill Cemetery, Gallipolis
- Party: Republican
- Spouse: Mary S. Stewart
- Children: two
- Education: Nelson's Commercial College

Military service
- Allegiance: United States
- Branch/service: Union Army
- Years of service: August 19, 1862 – July 25, 1865
- Unit: 117th Ohio Infantry

John C. Hutsinpiller (11 December 1840 – 20 June 1927) was a Republican politician from Gallia County, Ohio, United States who served in the Ohio State Senate 1894 to 1898, and was President of the Senate 1896 to 1898.

== Biography ==
John C. Hutsinpiller was born in Gallia County, Ohio, on December 11, 1840. He lived on a farm until the American Civil War broke out. He enlisted in the 117th Ohio Infantry on August 12, 1862 or August 19, 1862. This regiment became the First Ohio Heavy Artillery. He mustered out July 25, 1865.

Hutsinpiller took a course at Nelson's Business College, and started a furniture manufacturing business in Cincinnati, Ohio. He moved the business to Gallipolis, Gallia County in 1868, known as the Fuller & Hutsinpiller Company.

He was appointed a trustee of the Athens State Asylum by Ohio Governor Foraker, and was re-appointed by Governors Campbell and McKinley.

In 1893, Hutsinpiller was nominated by the Republicans for the eighth district of the Ohio State Senate, and was elected by a majority of 11,720. He was re-elected in 1895, and was selected as president pro tem in the 72nd General Assembly, 1896-1898.

Hutsinpiller was married to Mary S. Stewart in 1873. They had two children. He died June 20, 1927, at Gallipolis, and is buried at Mound Hill Cemetery. He was a Methodist and Mason.
