= Charles John Howard =

American politician

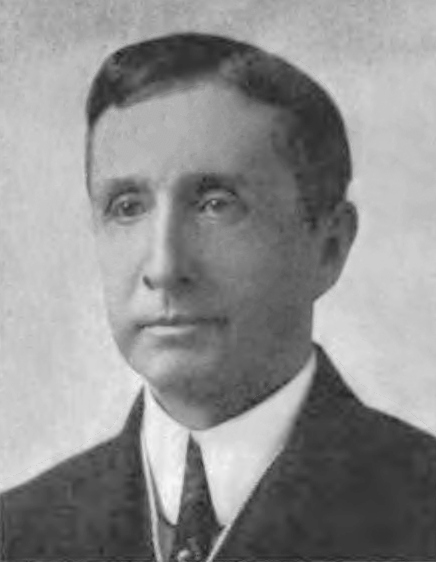

Member of the Ohio Senate from the 20th - 22nd district
- In office 1913–1916 Serving with Justin A. Moore
- Preceded by: John J. Purinton
- Succeeded by: A. A. Galbreath; Charles A. White

Personal details
- Born: March 26, 1862 Barnesville, Ohio, U.S.
- Died: May 13, 1928 (aged 66) Baltimore, Maryland, U.S.
- Party: Republican
- Education: Ohio State University; Cincinnati Law School
- Occupation: lawyer

Charles John Howard (March 25, 1862 – May 13, 1928) was a legislator in both houses of the Ohio legislature around the turn of the nineteenth century. He was President of the Ohio Senate in 1915 and 1916.

Charles John Howard was born at Barnesville, Ohio on March 26, 1862. His father was Albertus B. Howard, a native of Frederick, Maryland. He graduated from Barnesville public schools, spent three years at Ohio State University and graduated from Cincinnati Law School. He practiced law at Barnesville, was Solicitor of Barnesville for twelve years, and served two terms on the board of education.

Howard was elected to the Ohio House of Representatives from Belmont County for the 72nd and 73rd General Assemblies, (1896 to 1899). He was later elected to the Ohio State Senate from the combined 20th - 22nd district for the 80th General Assembly, (1913 to 1914), where he was selected floor leader of the minority Republicans. He was re-elected to the 81st General Assembly, (1915 and 1916), and, with the Republicans in the majority, he was elected President Pro Tempore. He was unmarried when elected to the Senate. He died in a hospital at Baltimore, Maryland in 1928.

== Notes ==
Ohio House of Representatives
Preceded by Joseph C. Heinlein	Representative from Belmont County; 1896-1899; Served alongside: Joseph E. Blackburn (1896-1897); Elihu B. Armstrong (1898-1899)	Succeeded by Elihu B. Armstrong
Ohio Senate
Preceded by John J. Purinton	Senator from 20th - 22nd District; 1864-1865; Served alongside: Justin A. Moore	Succeeded by A. A. Galbreth; Charles A. White
Preceded by William Green	President of the Senate; 1915-1916	Succeeded by Jacob Henry Miller
