= Terry Johnson (Ohio politician) =

American politician (born 1956)

Member of the Ohio Senate from the 14th district
- Incumbent
- Assumed office September 4, 2019
- Preceded by: Joe Uecker

Member of the Ohio House of Representatives from the 90th district
- In office January 3, 2011 – December 31, 2018
- Preceded by: Todd Book
- Succeeded by: Brian Baldridge

Personal details
- Born: June 4, 1956 (age 70) Portsmouth, Ohio, U.S.
- Party: Republican
- Education: Ohio University (BA, DO)

Terry A. Johnson (born June 4, 1956) is an American politician serving as a Republican member of the Ohio Senate from the 14th District. He is an osteopathic physician who was a member of the Ohio House of Representatives for the 90th district from 2011 to 2018.

He was unopposed in the primary and faced Democrat construction worker Ron Hadsell in the general election. Johnson won with 58.38% of the vote. In 2012, he carried 64.07% of the vote as he was easily re-elected to a second term over Portsmouth City Council President John Haas. He earned a third term in 2014, again carrying 64% of the vote over Thom Davis.

Johnson's 2010 election made him the first Republican to capture the seat since 1954, and his 2012 re-election campaign saw him become the first Republican to earn major endorsements and support from area labor unions.

In 2011, Johnson was named Family Physician of the Year by the Ohio State chapter of the American College of Osteopathic Family Physicians.

== Ohio House of Representatives ==
=== 2010 campaign and election ===
Johnson first considered running for State Representative in 2009. At the time, he was the Scioto County Coroner and serving in Iraq as a member of the Ohio National Guard.

Johnson described his thought process in an interview with the Community Common, saying:

"I have considered running for state representative because it's the right thing to do. We need someone with a good education, a good personality, someone that comes from our area to represent the 89th District. When you set back and look at all the wonderful people we have that do not step up, and you think they should step up, you have to look in the mirror. So, I looked in the mirror."

Johnson received positive feedback and officially launched his campaign later that year.

Shortly after Johnson entered the race, the only other declared candidate—Democrat Bob Walton, Jr. -- withdrew, saying it was "not the right time" for him to run. Two new candidates, businessman Ron Hadsell and Scioto County Commissioner Mike Crabtree, later competed for the Democratic nomination. Hadsell won the nomination in a race so divisive that Crabtree ended up endorsing Johnson and leaving the Democratic party.

Johnson received numerous endorsements during the course of the 2010 campaign, including one from the Ironton Tribune in which they praised his leadership and experience fighting prescription drug abuse

At end of the campaign, Johnson was elected by a wide margin. Immediately after the results came in, he vowed to set his sights on southern Ohio's problem of prescription drug abuse, saying "We know what our priority is here in Scioto County. It’s what is killing us. It’s prescription drug abuse."

=== First term ===
Immediately after being sworn into office, Johnson began drafting legislation to address the issue of prescription drug abuse. Just a few months into his first term, Johnson had completed the legislation and introduced it as House Bill 93. The bill put limitations on in-office dispensing of controlled drugs, put licensing requirements on pain clinics and contained a take-back program to help people safely dispose of unused medications.

On May 20, House Bill 93 was signed into law by Ohio Governor John Kasich. HB93 was signed just two months after it had first been introduced, leading the Ohio News Network to remark that Johnson's bill had gone from concept to law in "record speed."

In addition to pushing through new laws to combat the problem, Johnson also managed to bring a higher awareness to the damage caused by "pill mills" and prescription drug abuse. Kasich and Attorney General Mike DeWine, in addition to many others, joined Johnson in making the issue a priority shortly after taking office.

After keeping his promise to crack down on prescription drug abuse, Johnson also made headlines by fighting against the closure of several guard towers at the Southern Ohio Correctional Facility and publicly opposing Kasich's decision to close the Ohio River Valley Juvenile Correctional Facility.

=== 2012 re-election ===
Johnson ran for re-election in 2012, though his district had been re-drawn and re-designated from the 89th District to the 90th District. In that campaign, Johnson became the first Republican to earn endorsements from "several statewide and local unions" who cited his willingness to stand up for the interests of his district, even if it meant opposing the leaders of his own party. Johnson went on to easily win re-election, defeating Portsmouth City Council President John Haas by a margin of 64%-36%.

=== 2014 re-election ===
Johnson won a third term to the Ohio House in 2014, again earning 64% of the vote and nearly doubling the total earned by Democrat Thom Davis. Johnson again earned support from across the political spectrum and earned the endorsement of the Ironton Tribune.

In their recommendation, the Tribune praised Johnson for his work combatting drug abuse, saying: "Johnson, a physician and the only medical doctor in the state legislature, has made huge strides in the fight against prescription drug abuse, championing House Bill 93, which effectively shut down pill mills in the area."

Johnson cruised to victory, winning all three counties in the district by double digits. He carried Adams County 70%-30%, Scioto County 64%-36% and Lawrence County 57%-43%.

== Ohio State Senate ==
Johnson was term limited in 2018. He was succeeded by Brian Baldridge. Johnson was hired by Valley View Health Centers to serve as a director. After state senator Joe Uecker resigned to take a position with the Ohio Department of Transportation (ODOT), a screening committee selected Johnson to fill the seat in September 2019.

=== Tenure ===
On March 5, 2021, he visited the Clermont County Chamber of Commerce to attend a round table discussion with Jeff Weir, Superintendent of the Clermont County Educational Service Center, and Harry Snyder, President and CEO of Great Oaks Career Campuses. They discussed work-ready initiatives and issues facing local school districts.
