= Cooper Snyder =

American politician (1928–2019)

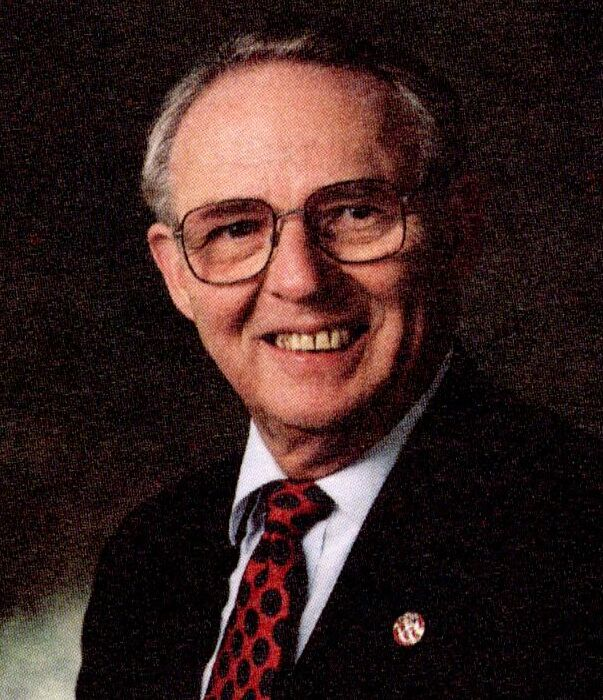

Member of the Ohio Senate from the 14th district
- In office April 3, 1979 – March 30, 1996
- Preceded by: Bill Mussey
- Succeeded by: Doug White

Personal details
- Born: Harry Cooper Snyder Jr. July 10, 1928 Blanchester, Ohio U.S.
- Died: October 14, 2019 (aged 91) Wilmington, Ohio, U.S.
- Party: Republican
- Spouse: Dorothy Bacot Snyder (m. 1949; died 2019)
- Children: 6

Harry Cooper Snyder Jr. (July 10, 1928 – October 14, 2019) was an American politician. He was affiliated with the Republican Party, and served on the Ohio Senate from 1979 to 1996 as a legislator from the 14th district.

== Early life ==
Snyder was born in Blanchester, Ohio. He was the owner of Snyder's Hardware. Snyder served on the Clinton County Board of Education.

== Political career ==
When Bill Mussey resigned from the Senate in 1979 to take a spot on the Ohio Industrial Commission, Snyder was appointed to his seat. He was elected to his own full term a year later, in 1980. He won re-election to a second term in 1984.

In 1988, Snyder initially sought to run for the United States House of Representatives, but instead remained in the Senate, winning a third term. He won a fourth term in the Senate in 1992. By 1994, Snyder again sought to run for the United States Congress for a seat held by first-term Congressman Ted Strickland, but in a crowded Republican primary, Snyder lost the nomination to Frank Cremeans, who won the election.

With his Congressional defeat, Snyder returned to the Senate. By 1996, Snyder announced that he would retire, citing term limits as the reason. In an effort to give a successor a head start, Snyder resigned early from the seat, and was replaced by Doug White, who served as Senate President later in his term. He served as Chairman of the Ohio Community School Network, until retiring in the early 2000s.

During his time in the Senate, he was passionate about education. He pushed for Post Secondary Enrollment Options, advocated for mandatory kindergarten attendance, and supported proficiency testing. In 1991, the University of Cincinnati Clermont College unveiled The Dorothy and Cooper Snyder Education Building to honor both Snyder and his wife Dorothy for their efforts to bring educational opportunities to under-served areas. In August 2018, Snyder was awarded a Certificate of Appreciation by the Ohio Department of Higher Education.

== Personal life and death ==
Snyder married Dorothy Bacot on July 7, 1949, and together they had six children. Dorothy played a significant role during Snyder's time in the Senate and she frequently accompanied him to events, meetings, and legislative sessions. In the final years of their lives, they lived at the Ohio Living Cape May retirement community in Wilmington, Ohio. Dorothy died in her sleep on June 15, 2019, and Cooper died nearly four months later, at age 91, on October 14, 2019.
