= Tom Niehaus =

American politician

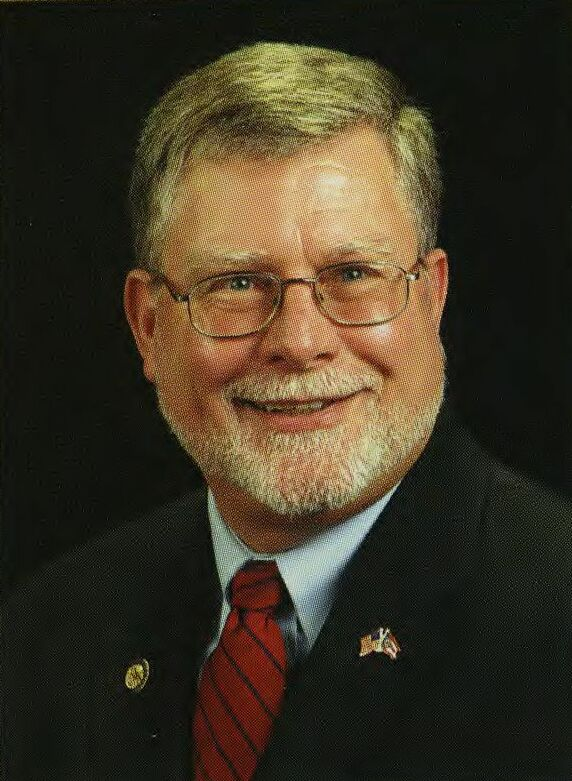

93rd President of the Ohio Senate
- In office January 3, 2011 – December 31, 2012
- Preceded by: Bill Harris
- Succeeded by: Keith Faber

Member of the Ohio Senate from the 14th district
- In office January 3, 2005 – December 31, 2012
- Preceded by: Doug White
- Succeeded by: Joe Uecker

Member of the Ohio House of Representatives from the 88th district
- In office January 3, 2001 – December 31, 2004
- Preceded by: Rose Vesper
- Succeeded by: Danny Bubp

Personal details
- Party: Republican
- Spouse: Emily Niehaus
- Education: Xavier University, Ohio State University
- Profession: Journalist

Tom Niehaus is a former American politician who served as President of the Ohio Senate from 2011 to 2012. He was also the state senator for the 14th District from 2005 to 2012 and served in the Ohio House of Representatives from 2001 to 2004. Currently, he works as a principal with Vorys Advisors LLC, a wholly owned affiliate of the law firm Vorys, Sater, Seymour and Pease. In this role, Niehaus provides business and strategic counsel to the law firm’s clients, as well as other businesses and organizations. He works in the firm’s Cincinnati office and also maintains an office in Columbus.

== Career ==
A graduate of Xavier University and Ohio State University, Niehaus spent ten years with Harte Hanks Communications and 15 years (ten as an editor/publisher) with Community Press, a network of 27 community newspapers serving the Greater Cincinnati area.

When incumbent Representative Rose Vesper's term was limited, Niehaus sought to replace her. In the 2000 election, he defeated Melvin Dean and Scott Boone to win the Republican nomination with 46% of the vote. He won the general election against Democrat Ken Zuk by 10,000 votes and was unopposed for reelection in 2002.

== Ohio Senate ==
Midway through 2003, Niehaus and Jean Schmidt stated their intentions to run for the Senate President position to succeed Doug White in 2004. Niehaus was supported by Senator White and former Representative Rose Vesper, while Schmidt received support from Speaker of the House Larry Householder. The primary proved to be one of the closest watched of the cycle. The campaign prompted complaints over fundraising tactics and featured testy television spots centered on disputes over tax votes. The Ohio Taxpayers Association launched a $100,000 TV "issue ad" campaign labelling Mr. Niehaus a tax-hiker.

Schmidt initially defeated Niehaus by 62 votes. However, with a mandatory recount enacted and the counting of provisional ballots beginning, Niehaus closed the gap, and by late March, Niehaus took the lead. Niehaus was certified the winner by 22 votes. Niehaus went on to defeat Democrat Paul Schwietering by 53,000 votes.

In his first term in the Senate, Niehaus served as Chairman of the Senate Environment & Natural Resources Committee. In 2008, following Randy Gardner's resignation from the Senate, Niehaus was chosen by Senate colleagues to take his place as Senate majority floor leader. After Jeff Jacobson's resignation, Niehaus was again elevated to Senate President pro tempore.

Niehaus won reelection in 2008 against Democrat Gregory Napolitano by 50,000 votes and was selected to serve as President pro tempore for the 128th General Assembly.

Niehaus served again as President of the Senate for the 129th General Assembly. On the opening day of that assembly, Niehaus set a tone for bipartisanship, stating, "I want to assure the Senate that this will be a deliberative body where all voices will be heard." As President of the Senate, Niehaus also served as chairman of the Rules and Reference Committee.
