= 107th Ohio General Assembly =

The One Hundred Seventh Ohio General Assembly was the legislative body of the state of Ohio in 1967 and 1968. In this General Assembly, both the Ohio Senate and the Ohio House of Representatives were controlled by the Republican Party. In the Senate, there were 23 Republicans and 10 Democrats. In the House, there were 61 Republicans and 38 Democrats. It was the first General Assembly to take effect after the Voting Rights Act of 1965 required population proportioned districts. The seats were apportioned in 1966.

== Senate ==
=== Leadership ===
==== Majority leadership ====
- President of the Senate: John W. Brown
- President pro tempore of the Senate: Theodore Gray
- Majority Whip: Michael Maloney

==== Minority leadership ====
- Leader: Frank W. King
- Assistant Leader: Oliver Ocasek

=== Members of the 107th Senate ===
District	Senator	Party	First elected
1	Howard C. Cook	Republican	1966
2	Tennyson Guyer	Republican	1958
3	Ted Gray	Republican	1950
4	Walter E. Powell	Republican	1966
5	Clara Weisenborn	Republican	1966
6	David Holcomb	Republican	1966
7	Michael Maloney	Republican	1964 (Appt.)
8	Stanley Aronoff	Republican	1966
9	Calvin C. Johnson	Democratic	1966
10	Max Dennis	Republican	1963 (Appt.)
11	Frank W. King	Democratic	1958
12	Paul Gillmor	Republican	1966
13	Harry Jump	Republican	1966
14	Robin Turner	Republican	1962
15	John W. Bowen	Republican	1966
16	Bob Shaw	Republican	1952
17	Harry Armstrong	Republican	1966
18	Oakley C. Collins	Republican	1950
19	James K. Leedy	Republican	1966
20	Tom V. Moorehead	Republican	1962
21	Morris Jackson	Democratic	1966
22	Anthony O. Calabrese	Democratic	1956
23	Anthony F. Novak	Democratic	1964
24	Francis D. Sullivan	Democratic	1962
25	John Weeks	Republican	1966
26	William W. Taft	Republican	1966
27	Oliver Ocasek	Democratic	1958
28	William B. Nye	Democratic	1966
29	Ralph Regula	Republican	1966
30	John Longsworth	Republican	1966
31	Robert Stockdale	Republican	1962
32	Bishop Kilpatrick	Democratic	1966
33	Charles J. Carney	Democratic	1950

== House of Representatives ==
=== Leadership ===
- Speaker of the House: Charles Kurfess

==== Members of the 107th House of Representatives ====
District	Representative	Party	First elected
1	Fred Hadley	Republican	1964
2	Robert Wilhelm	Republican	1964
3	Vaughn Stocksdale	Democratic	1964
4	Charles Kurfess	Republican	1956
5	Ralph Cole	Republican	1954
6	Walter White	Republican	1956
7	Bob Netzley	Republican	1960
8	Rodney Hughes	Republican	1966
9	Charles Fry	Republican	1964
10	Herman Ankeney	Republican	1952
11	Corwin M. Nixon	Republican	1962
12	Bill Mussey	Republican	1966
13	Howard Knight	Republican	1962
14	Ethel Swanbeck	Republican	1954
15	Robert Carpenter	Republican	1962
16	Lloyd Kerns	Republican	1960
17	Richard Christiansen	Democratic	1960
18	Kenneth Creasy	Republican	1958
19	John McDonald	Democratic	1964
20	Joseph Hiestand	Republican	1964
21	Myrl Shoemaker	Democratic	1958
22	Vern Riffe	Democratic	1958
23	Dennis Dannley	Republican	1960
24	Ralph E. Fisher	Republican	1948
25	John Weis	Republican	1962
26	Carlton Davidson	Republican	1960
27	Ralph Welker	Republican	1964
28	David Weissert	Republican	1960
29	Don Goddard	Republican	1964
30	A.G. Lancione	Democratic	1946
31	Robert Evans	Republican	1960
32	William Hinig	Democratic	1964
33	Douglas Applegate	Democratic	1960
34	Clarence Wetzel	Republican	1948
35	Joseph Kainrad	Democratic	1962
36	Edwin Hofstetter	Republican	1966
37	Joe Tulley	Republican	1966
38	E. W. Lampson	Republican	1962
39	Barry Levey	Republican	1962
40	Thomas Rentschler	Republican	1966
41	Tom Hill	Democratic	1966
42	Larry Smith	Democratic	1966
43	Anthony Russo	Democratic	1964
44	Phillip DeLaine	Democratic	1968 (Appt.)
45	Donald Nowack	Democratic	1966
46	Troy Lee James	Democratic	1966
47	Patrick Sweeney	Democratic	1966
48	Jim Flannery	Democratic	1966
49	Mark C. Schinnerer	Republican	1966
50	James P. Celebrezze	Democratic	1964
51	Ron Mottl	Democratic	1966
52	George Mastics	Republican	1966
53	George Voinovich	Republican	1966
54	Allen J. Bartunek	Republican	1966
55	Frank Gorman	Democratic	1964
56	Richard Hollington	Republican	1966
57	Frank Pokorny	Democratic	1956
58	Robert E. Holmes	Republican	1960
59	Alan Norris	Republican	1966
60	Roger Tracy	Republican	1966
61	Mack Pemberton	Republican	1966
62	Doris Jones	Republican	1966
63	Phale Hale	Democratic	1966
64	Keith McNamara	Republican	1960
65	John Bechtold	Republican	1966
66	W. Ray Cadwallader	Republican	1964
67	Frank H. Mayfield	Republican	1968 (Appt.)
68	Robert Reckman	Republican	1952
69	Bill Bowen	Democratic	1966
70	Norman Murdock	Republican	1966
71	Gordon H. Scherer	Republican	1964
72	William L. Mallory, Sr.	Democratic	1966
73	Bill Anderson	Republican	1966
74	Ed DeChant	Democratic	1948
75	Henry Schriver	Republican	1966
76	John Galbraith	Republican	1966
77	James Weldishofer	Republican	1966
78	James Holzemer	Democratic	1964
79	Marigene Valiquette	Democratic	1962
80	Barney Quilter	Democratic	1966
81	Tom Gilmartin	Democratic	1966
82	Jim Panno	Democratic	1964
83	Walter Paulo	Republican	1966
84	Albert Sealy	Republican	1966
85	David Albritton	Republican	1960
86	Frank Mills	Democratic	1966
87	Robert Roderer	Democratic	1954
88	C.J. McLin	Democratic	1966
89	Michael Gamble	Democratic	1966
90	James Thorpe	Republican	1966
91	Robert Levitt	Republican	1962
92	Richard Reichel	Republican	1966
93	Morris Boyd	Republican	1966
94	Robert Manning	Republican	1966
95	Claude Fiocca	Democratic	1966
96	David Headley	Democratic	1966
97	John Poda	Democratic	1966
98	Margaret Dennison	Republican	1962
99	James B. Hagan	Democratic	1966

Appt.- Member was appointed to current House Seat

== See also ==
- List of Ohio state legislatures
