= 108th Ohio General Assembly =

The One Hundred Eighth Ohio General Assembly was the legislative body of the state of Ohio in 1969 and 1970. In this General Assembly, both the Ohio Senate and the Ohio House of Representatives were controlled by the Republican Party. In the Senate, there were 21 Republicans and 12 Democrats. In the House, there were 63 Republicans and 36 Democrats. It was the second General Assembly to use districts drawn after the 1966 apportionment.

== Major events ==
=== Vacancies ===
- January 13, 1969: Senator Frank W. King (D-11th) resigns.
- January 30, 1969: Senator Harry V. Jump (R-13th) resigns.
- February 9, 1970: Senator Calvin Johnson (D-9th) resigns.

=== Appointments ===
- January 14, 1969: Marigene Valiquette is appointed to the 11th Senatorial District.
- February 5, 1969: Robert J. Corts is appointed to the 13th Senatorial District.
- February 11, 1970: Bill Bowen is appointed to the 9th Senatorial District.

== Senate ==
=== Leadership ===
==== Majority leadership ====
- President of the Senate: John W. Brown
- President pro tempore of the Senate: Theodore Gray
- Majority Whip: Michael Maloney

==== Minority leadership ====
- Leader: Anthony Calabrese
- Assistant Leader: Oliver Ocasek

=== Members of the 108th Senate ===
District	Senator	Party	First elected
1	Howard C. Cook	Republican	1966
2	Tennyson Guyer	Republican	1958
3	Ted Gray	Republican	1950
4	Walter E. Powell	Republican	1966
5	Clara Weisenborn	Republican	1966
6	David Holcomb	Republican	1966
7	Michael Maloney	Republican	1964 (Appt.)
8	Stanley Aronoff	Republican	1966
9	Bill Bowen	Democratic	1970 (Appt.)
10	Max Dennis	Republican	1963 (Appt.)
11	Marigene Valiquette	Democratic	1969 (Appt.)
12	Paul Gillmor	Republican	1966
13	Robert J. Corts	Republican	1968
14	Robin Turner	Republican	1962
15	John W. Bowen	Republican	1966
16	Robert Shaw	Republican	1952
17	Harry Armstrong	Republican	1966
18	Oakley C. Collins	Republican	1950
19	James K. Leedy	Republican	1966
20	Robert Secrest	Democratic	1968
21	Morris Jackson	Democratic	1966
22	Anthony O. Calabrese	Democratic	1956
23	Anthony F. Novak	Democratic	1962
24	Ron Mottl	Democratic	1968
25	John Weeks	Republican	1966
26	William W. Taft	Republican	1966
27	Oliver Ocasek	Democratic	1958
28	William B. Nye	Democratic	1966
29	Ralph Regula	Republican	1966
30	Doug Applegate	Democratic	1968
31	Robert Stockdale	Republican	1962
32	Bishop Kilpatrick	Democratic	1966
33	Charles J. Carney	Democratic	1950

== House of Representatives ==
=== Leadership ===
==== Majority ====
- Speaker of the House: Charles Kurfess
- Speaker Pro Tempore: Charles Fry
- Majority Leader: Robert Levitt
- Assistant Majority Leader: Walter White

==== Minority ====
- Minority Leader: John McDonald
- Assistant Minority Leader: Anthony Russo
- Minority Whip: Troy Lee James

=== Members of the 108th House of Representatives ===
District	Representative	Party	First elected
1	Fred Hadley	Republican	1964
2	Robert Wilhelm	Republican	1964
3	Jack P. Oliver	Republican	1968
4	Charles Kurfess	Republican	1956
5	Robert D. Schuck	Republican	1968
6	Walter White	Republican	1956
7	Bob Netzley	Republican	1960
8	Rodney Hughes	Republican	1966
9	Charles Fry	Republican	1964
10	John Scott	Republican	1968
11	Corwin Nixon	Republican	1962
12	Bill Mussey	Republican	1966
13	Howard Knight	Republican	1962
14	Ethel Swanbeck	Republican	1954
15	Robert Carpenter	Republican	1962
16	Lloyd Kerns	Republican	1960
17	Richard Christiansen	Democratic	1960
18	Kenneth Creasy	Republican	1958
19	John McDonald	Democratic	1964
20	Joseph Hiestand	Republican	1964
21	Myrl Shoemaker	Democratic	1958
22	Vern Riffe	Democratic	1958
23	William G. Batchelder	Republican	1968
24	Ralph E. Fisher	Republican	1948
25	Don Maddux	Democratic	1968
26	Carlton Davidson	Republican	1960
27	Ralph Welker	Republican	1964
28	David Weissert	Republican	1960
29	Don Goddard	Republican	1964
30	A.G. Lancione	Democratic	1946
31	John Baker	Republican	1968
32	William Hinig	Democratic	1964
33	Arthur Bowers	Democratic	1968
34	Clarence Wetzel	Republican	1948
35	Anice Johnson	Republican	1968
36	James I. Hunt	Republican	1968
37	Joe Tulley	Republican	1966
38	E. W. Lampson	Republican	1962
39	Barry Levey	Republican	1962
40	Thomas Rentschler	Republican	1966
41	Tom Hill	Democratic	1966
42	Larry Smith	Democratic	1966
43	Anthony Russo	Democratic	1964
44	Phillip DeLaine	Democratic	1968 (Appt.)
45	Donald Nowack	Democratic	1966
46	Troy Lee James	Democratic	1966
47	Patrick Sweeney	Democratic	1966
48	Jim Flannery	Democratic	1966
49	Mark C. Schinnerer	Republican	1966
50	James P. Celebrezze	Democratic	64
51	Gertrude Polcar	Republican	1968
52	George Mastics	Republican	1966
53	George Voinovich	Republican	1966
54	Allen J. Bartunek	Republican	1966
55	Leonard Ostrovsky	Democratic	1968
56	Richard Hollington	Republican	1966
57	Walter Rutkowski	Democratic	1968
58	Larry Hughes	Republican	1968
59	Alan Norris	Republican	1966
60	Roger Tracy	Republican	1966
61	Mack Pemberton	Republican	1966
62	Doris Jones	Republican	1966
63	Phale Hale	Democratic	1966
64	Keith McNamara	Republican	1960
65	John Bechtold	Republican	1966
66	Dale Schmidt	Republican	1968
67	Frank H. Mayfield	Republican	1968 (Appt.)
68	Chester Cruze	Republican	1968
69	Ed Burden	Democratic	1970 (Appt.)
70	Norman Murdock	Republican	1966
71	Gordon H. Scherer	Republican	1964
72	William L. Mallory Sr.	Democratic	1966
73	Thomas Pottenger	Republican	1968
74	Leo Camera	Democratic	1968
75	Don Pease	Democratic	1968
76	John Galbraith	Republican	1966
77	Donald Fraser	Republican	1968
78	Casey Jones	Democratic	1968
79	Arthur Wilkowski	Democratic	1969 (Appt.)
80	Barney Quilter	Democratic	1966
81	John V. McCarthy	Democratic	1968
82	George D. Tablack	Democratic	1970 (Appt.)
83	Walter Paulo	Republican	1966
84	Fred Young	Republican	1968
85	David Albritton	Republican	1960
86	James Pippenger	Democratic	1970 (Appt.)
87	Tony P. Hall	Democratic	1968
88	C.J. McLin	Democratic	1966
89	Ross Heintzelman	Republican	1968
90	James Thorpe	Republican	1966
91	Robert Levitt	Republican	1962
92	Richard Reichel	Republican	1966
93	Morris Boyd	Republican	1966
94	Robert Manning	Republican	1966
95	Claude Fiocca	Democratic	1966
96	David Headley	Democratic	1966
97	John Poda	Democratic	1966
98	Larry Nord	Republican	1968
99	Michael Del Bane	Democratic	1968

Appt.- Member was appointed to current House Seat

== See also ==
- Ohio House of Representatives membership, 126th General Assembly
- Ohio House of Representatives membership, 125th General Assembly
- List of Ohio state legislatures
