= 109th Ohio General Assembly =

The One Hundred Ninth Ohio General Assembly was the legislative body of the state of Ohio in 1971 and 1972. In this General Assembly, both the Ohio Senate and the Ohio House of Representatives were controlled by the Republican Party. In the Senate, there were 20 Republicans and 13 Democrats. In the House, there were 54 Republicans and 45 Democrats. It was the last General Assembly to use districts drawn after the 1966 apportionment.

== Major events ==
=== Vacancies ===
- January 5, 1971: Senator Walter E. Powell (R-4th) resigns to take a seat in the United States House of Representatives.
- January 11, 1971: Senator William B. Nye (D-28th) resigns to take a seat in the cabinet of Governor John Gilligan.
- December 31, 1971: Senator James K. Leedy (R-19th) resigns.
- December 15, 1972: Senator Jerry O'Shaughnessy (D-15th) dies.

=== Appointments ===
- January 5, 1971: Donald E. “Buz” Lukens is appointed to the 4th Senatorial District.
- January 12, 1972: Kenneth F. Berry is appointed to the 19th Senatorial District.
- January 13, 1971: John Poda is appointed to the 28th Senatorial District.
- January 1973: Robert O'Shaughnessy is appointed to the 15th District.

== Senate ==
=== Leadership ===
==== Majority leadership ====
- President of the Senate: John W. Brown
- President pro tempore of the Senate: Theodore Gray
- Majority Whip:

==== Minority leadership ====
- Leader: Anthony Calabrese
- Assistant Leader: Oliver Ocasek

=== Members of the 109th Ohio Senate ===
District	Senator	Party	First elected
1	Howard C. Cook	Republican	1966
2	Tennyson Guyer	Republican	1958
3	Ted Gray	Republican	1950
4	Buz Lukens	Republican	1971 (Appt.)
5	Clara Weisenborn	Republican	1966
6	David Holcomb	Republican	1966
7	Michael Maloney	Republican	1964 (Appt.)
8	Stanley Aronoff	Republican	1966
9	Bill Bowen	Democratic	1970 (Appt.)
10	Max Dennis	Republican	1963 (Appt.)
11	Marigene Valiquette	Democratic	1969 (Appt.)
12	Paul Gillmor	Republican	1966
13	Robert J. Corts	Republican	1968
14	Robin Turner	Republican	1962
15	Robert O'Shaughnessy	Democratic	1972 (Appt.)
16	Bob Shaw	Republican	1952
17	Harry Armstrong	Republican	1966
18	Oakley C. Collins	Republican	1950
19	Kenneth F. Berry	Republican	1972 (Appt.)
20	Robert Secrest	Democratic	1968
21	Morris Jackson	Democratic	1966
22	Anthony O. Calabrese	Democratic	1956
23	Anthony F. Novak	Democratic	1962
24	Ron Mottl	Democratic	1968
25	Paul Matia	Republican	1970
26	William W. Taft	Republican	1966
27	Oliver Ocasek	Democratic	1958
28	John Poda	Democratic	1971 (Appt.)
29	Ralph Regula	Republican	1966
30	Doug Applegate	Democratic	1968
31	Robert Stockdale	Republican	1962
32	Bishop Kilpatrick	Democratic	1966
33	Harry Meshel	Democratic	1970

== House of Representatives ==
=== Members of the 109th Ohio House of Representatives ===
District	Representative	Party	First elected
1	Fred Hadley	Republican	1967
2	Robert Wilhelm	Republican	1967
3	Jack P. Oliver	Republican	1968
4	Charles Kurfess	Republican	1967
5	Robert D. Schuck	Republican	1968
6	Walter White	Republican	1967
7	Bob Netzley	Republican	1967
8	Rodney Hughes	Republican	1967
9	Charles Fry	Republican	1967
10	John Scott	Republican	1968
11	Corwin Nixon	Republican	1967
12	Bill Mussey	Republican	1967
13	Howard Knight	Republican	1967
14	Ethel Swanbeck	Republican	1967
15	Paul Pfeifer	Republican	1970
16	Lloyd Kerns	Republican	1967
17	Richard Christiansen	Democratic	1967
18	Kenneth Creasy	Republican	1967
19	Raymond Luther	Republican	1970
20	Joseph Hiestand	Republican	1967
21	Myrl Shoemaker	Democratic	1967
22	Vern Riffe	Democratic	1967
23	William G. Batchelder	Republican	1968
24	John Johnson	Democratic	1970
25	Don Maddux	Democratic	1968
26	Carlton Davidson	Republican	1967
27	Ralph Welker	Republican	1967
28	David Weissert	Republican	1967
29	Sam Speck	Republican	1970
30	A.G. Lancione	Democratic	1967
31	John Baker	Republican	1968
32	William Hinig	Democratic	1967
33	Arthur Bowers	Democratic	1968
34	John Wargo	Democratic	1970
35	Marcus Roberto	Democratic	1970
36	James Mueller	Democratic	1970
37	Joe Tulley	Republican	1967
38	E. W. Lampson	Republican	1967
39	David Armbruster	Democratic	1970
40	Tom Kindness	Republican	1970
41	Ike Thompson	Democratic	1970
42	Larry Smith	Democratic	1967
43	Anthony Russo	Democratic	1967
44	John Thompson	Democratic	1970
45	Robert Jaskulski	Democratic	1970
46	Troy Lee James	Democratic	1967
47	Patrick Sweeney	Democratic	1967
48	Jim Flannery	Democratic	1967
49	Richard Celeste	Democratic	1970
50	James Celebrezze	Democratic	1967
51	Donna Pope	Republican	1972 (Appt.)
52	George Mastics	Republican	1967
53	Edward Ryder	Republican	1971 (Appt.)
54	John Sweeney	Democratic	1970
55	Leonard Ostrovsky	Democratic	1968
56	Harry Lehman	Democratic	1970
57	Walter Rutkowski	Democratic	1968
58	Larry Hughes	Republican	1968
59	Alan Norris	Republican	1966
60	James Baumann	Democratic	1970
61	Mack Pemberton	Republican	1966
62	Doris Jones	Republican	1966
63	Phale Hale	Democratic	1966
64	Keith McNamara	Republican	1960
65	John Bechtold	Republican	1966
66	Dale Schmidt	Republican	1968
67	Frank H. Mayfield	Republican	1968 (Appt.)
68	Chester Cruze	Republican	1968
69	James Rankin	Democratic	1970
70	Norman Murdock	Republican	1966
71	Gordon M. Scherer	Republican	1964
72	William L. Mallory Sr.	Democratic	1966
73	Thomas Pottenger	Republican	1968
74	Leo Camera	Democratic	1968
75	Don Pease	Democratic	1968
76	John Galbraith	Republican	1966
77	Donald Fraser	Republican	1968
78	Casey Jones	Democratic	1968
79	Arthur Wilkowski	Democratic	1969 (Appt.)
80	Barney Quilter	Democratic	1966
81	John V. McCarthy	Democratic	1968
82	George D. Tablack	Democratic	1970 (Appt.)
83	Walter Paulo	Republican	1966
84	Fred Young	Republican	1968
85	David Albritton	Republican	1960
86	Tom Fries	Democratic	1970
87	Tony P. Hall	Democratic	1968
88	C.J. McLin	Democratic	1966
89	Ross Heintzelman	Republican	1968
90	James Thorpe	Republican	1966
91	Robert Levitt	Republican	1962
92	Richard Reichel	Republican	1966
93	Morris Boyd	Republican	1966
94	Robert Manning	Republican	1966
95	Claude Fiocca	Democratic	1966
96	David Headley	Democratic	1966
97	Ronald Weyandt	Democratic	1971 (Appt.)
98	Bob Nader	Democratic	1970
99	Michael Del Bane	Democratic	1968

Appt.- Member was appointed to current House Seat

== See also ==
- Ohio House of Representatives membership, 126th General Assembly
- Ohio House of Representatives membership, 125th General Assembly
- List of Ohio state legislatures
