= 110th Ohio General Assembly =

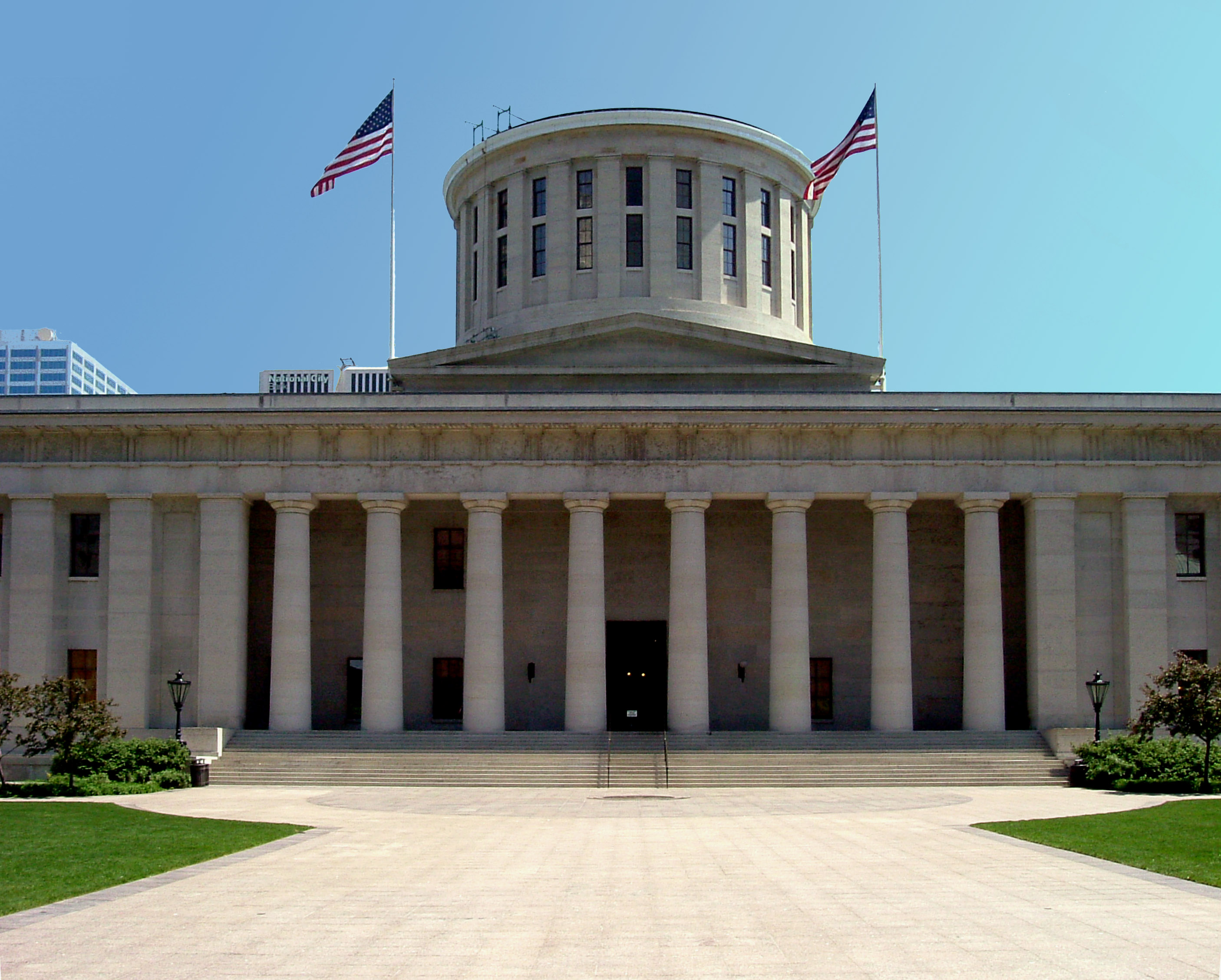
The Ohio Statehouse in Columbus, Ohio.

The One Hundred Tenth Ohio General Assembly was the legislative body of the state of Ohio in 1973 and 1974. In this General Assembly, the Ohio Senate was controlled by the Republican Party and the Ohio House of Representatives was controlled by the Democratic Party. In the Senate, there were 17 Republicans and 16 Democrats. In the House, there were 59 Democrats and 40 Republicans. This was the first Ohio General Assembly to use redistricted legislative districts from the 1970 United States census.

== Major events ==
=== Vacancies ===
- January 3, 1973: Senator Ralph Regula (R-29th) resigns to take a seat in the United States House of Representatives.
- December 31, 1973: Senator Robert Stockdale (R-31st) resigns due to health problems.
- December 6, 1974: Senator Ron Mottl (D-23rd) resigns to take a seat in the United States House of Representatives.

=== Appointments ===
- January 3, 1973: Richard Reichel is appointed to the 29th Senatorial District.
- January 31, 1973: Charles Bolton is appointed to the 31 Senatorial District.

== Senate ==
=== Leadership ===
==== Majority leadership ====
- President of the Senate: John W. Brown
- President pro tempore of the Senate: Theodore Gray
- Assistant pro tempore: Michael Maloney

==== Minority leadership ====
- Leader: Anthony Calabrese
- Assistant Leader: Oliver Ocasek

=== Members of the 110th Ohio Senate ===
District	Senator	Party	First elected
1	Howard C. Cook	Republican	1967
2	Paul Gillmor	Republican	1967
3	Ted Gray	Republican	1967
4	Buz Lukens	Republican	1971 (Appt.)
5	Clara Weisenborn	Republican	1967
6	Tony P. Hall	Democratic	1972
7	Michael Maloney	Republican	1967
8	Stanley Aronoff	Republican	1967
9	Bill Bowen	Democratic	1970 (Appt.)
10	Max Dennis	Republican	1967
11	Marigene Valiquette	Democratic	1969 (Appt.)
12	Walter White	Republican	1972
13	Robert J. Corts	Republican	1968
14	Bill Mussey	Republican	1972
15	Robert O'Shaughnessy	Democratic	1972 (Appt.)
16	Donald L. Woodland	Democratic	1972
17	Harry Armstrong	Republican	1967
18	Anice Johnson	Republican	1972
19	Tom Van Meter	Republican	1972
20	Robert Secrest	Democratic	1968
21	Morris Jackson	Democratic	1967
22	Anthony O. Calabrese	Democratic	1967
23	Anthony F. Novak	Democratic	1967
24	Ron Mottl	Democratic	1968
25	Paul Matia	Republican	1970
26	Gene Slagle	Democratic	1972
27	Oliver Ocasek	Democratic	1967
28	Dave Headley	Democratic	1972
29	Richard Reichel	Republican	1973 (Appt.)
30	Doug Applegate	Democratic	1968
31	Charles Bolton	Republican	1974 (Appt.)
32	Tom Carney	Democratic	1972
33	Harry Meshel	Democratic	1970

=== Members of the 110th Ohio House of Representatives ===
District	Representative	Party	First elected
1	Raymond Luther	Republican	1970
2	John Wargo	Democratic	1970
3	George Mastics	Republican	1967
4	James P. Celebrezze	Democratic	1967
5	Richard F. Celeste	Democratic	1970
6	Patrick Sweeney	Democratic	1967
7	Ken Rocco	Democratic	1972
8	Ed Feighan	Democratic	1972
9	Troy Lee James	Democratic	1967
10	Tom Bell	Democratic	1972
11	Robert Jaskulski	Democratic	1970
12	Donna Pope	Republican	1972 (Appt.)
13	Ike Thompson	Democratic	1970
14	John Sweeney	Democratic	1970
15	John Thompson	Democratic	1970
16	Harry Lehman	Democratic	1970
17	Virginia Aveni	Democratic	1972
18	John McCormack	Democratic	1972
19	Richard Finan	Republican	1972
20	John Brandenberg	Republican	1972
21	Norman Murdock	Republican	1966
22	Chester Cruze	Republican	1968
23	William L. Mallory Sr.	Democratic	1966
24	Jim Luken	Democratic	1972
25	James Rankin	Democratic	1970
26	Helen Fix	Republican	1972
27	Alan Norris	Republican	1966
28	Bill O'Neil	Republican	
29	William Kopp	Democratic	1972
30	Mike Stinziano	Democratic	1972
31	Phale Hale	Democratic	1966
32	James Baumann	Democratic	1970
33	Mack Pemberton	Republican	1966
34	Ed Orlett	Democratic	1972
35	Tom Fries	Democratic	1970
36	C.J. McLin	Democratic	1966
37	Paul Leonard	Democratic	1972
38	Fred Young	Republican	1968
39	Vernon Cook	Democratic	1972
40	Claude Fiocca	Democratic	1966
41	Kenneth Cox	Democratic	1972
42	Pete Crossland	Democratic	1972
43	Ronald Weyandt	Democratic	1971 (Appt.)
44	Richard L. Wittenberg	Democratic	1972
45	Casey Jones	Democratic	1968
46	Arthur Wilkowski	Democratic	1969 (Appt.)
47	Barney Quilter	Democratic	1966
48	Dick Maier	Republican	1972
49	Irene Smart	Democratic	1972
50	James Thorpe	Republican	1966
51	Tom Gilmartin	Democratic	1972
52	George D. Tablack	Democratic	1970 (Appt.)
53	Leo Camera	Democratic	1968
54	Don Pease	Democratic	1968
55	Bob Nader	Democratic	1970
56	Michael Del Bane	Democratic	1968
57	Bill Donham	Republican	1972
58	Thomas N. Kindness	Republican	1970
59	Joe Tulley	Republican	1967
60	David Hartley	Democratic	
61	Joan Douglass	Republican	1972
62	Marcus Roberto	Democratic	1970
63	John Scott	Republican	1968
64	Waldo Rose	Republican	1972
65	Frank H. Mayfield	Republican	1968 (Appt.)
66	Larry Hughes	Republican	1968
67	Larry Christman	Democratic	
68	John Johnson	Democratic	1970
69	John Galbraith	Republican	1966
70	Robert Levitt	Republican	1962
71	Tom Carney	Democratic	1972
72	Ethel Swanbeck	Republican	1967
73	Corwin Nixon	Republican	1967
74	James Mueller	Democratic	1970
75	Charles Fry	Republican	1967
76	Harry Turner	Republican	1972
77	Joseph Hiestand	Republican	1967
78	Rodney Hughes	Republican	1967
79	Fred Hadley	Republican	1967
80	Dale Locker	Democratic	1972
81	Bob Netzley	Republican	1967
82	Michael Oxley	Republican	1972
83	Charles Kurfess	Republican	1967
84	Fred Deering	Democratic	1972
85	Gene Damschroder	Republican	1972
86	Walter McClaskey	Republican	1972
87	Harry Mallott	Democratic	1972
88	Myrl Shoemaker	Democratic	1967
89	Vern Riffe	Democratic	1967
90	Don Maddux	Democratic	1968
91	Claire Ball	Republican	1972
92	Oakley Collins	Republican	1972
93	William G. Batchelder	Republican	1968
94	Rex Kieffer Jr.	Republican	1972
95	Sam Speck	Republican	1970
96	William Hinig	Democratic	1967
97	Robert Boggs	Democratic	1972
98	Arthur Bowers	Democratic	1968
99	A.G. Lancione	Democratic	1967

Appt.- Member was appointed to current House Seat

== See also ==
- Ohio House of Representatives membership, 126th General Assembly
- Ohio House of Representatives membership, 125th General Assembly
- List of Ohio state legislatures
