= 111th Ohio General Assembly =

American state legislative body, 1975–1976

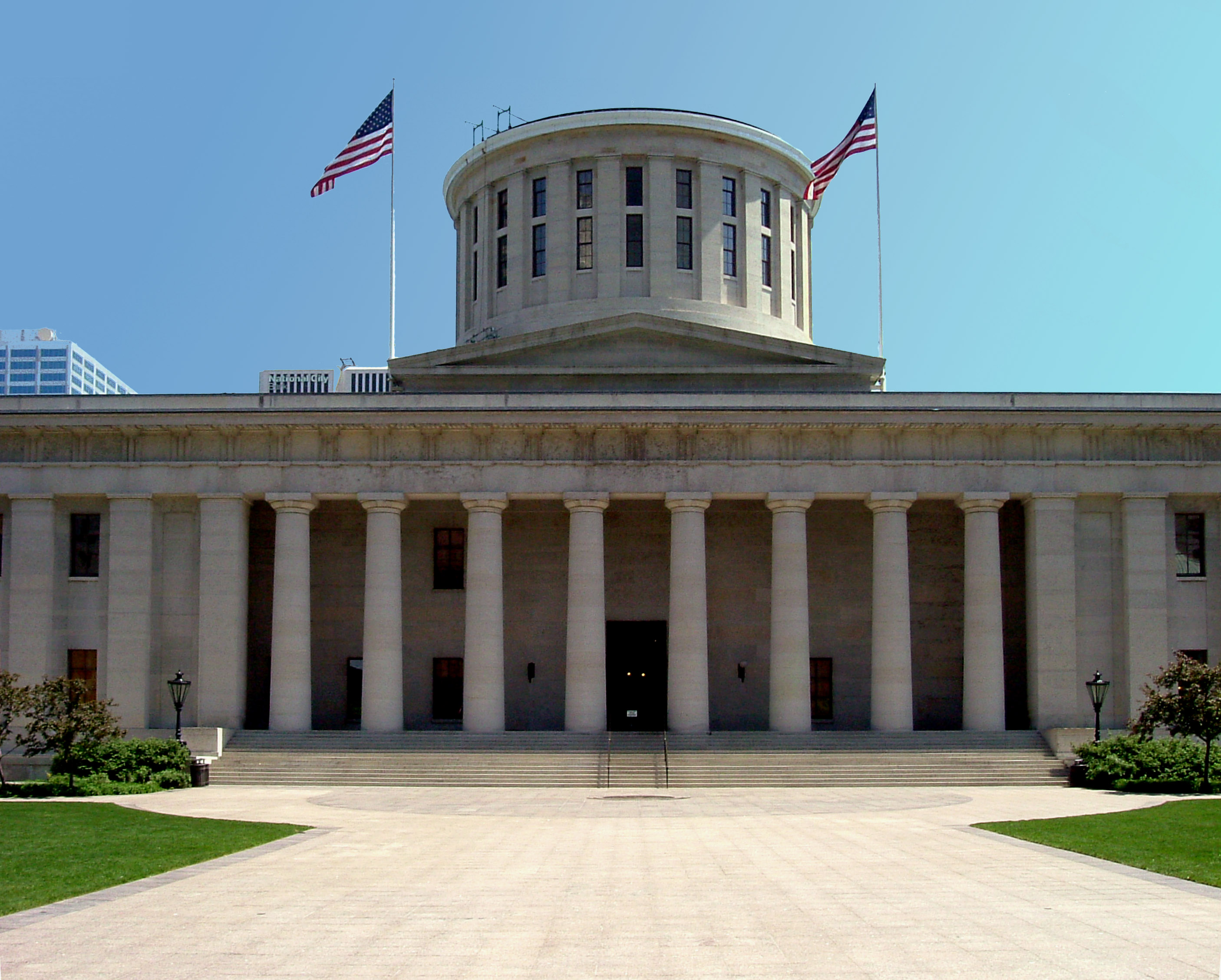
Ohio Statehouse in Columbus.

Seal of the Ohio House of Representatives.

The One Hundred Eleventh Ohio General Assembly was the legislative body of the state of Ohio in 1975 and 1976. In this General Assembly, both the Ohio Senate and the Ohio House of Representatives were controlled by the Democratic Party. In the Senate, there were 21 Democrats and 12 Republicans. In the House, there were 61 Democrats and 38 Republicans.

== Major events ==
=== Vacancies ===
- April 21, 1975: Senator Anice Johnson (R-18th) resigned.
- December 1, 1975: Representative Jim Luken (D-24th) resigned.

=== Appointments ===
- April 22, 1975: David W. Johnson is appointed to the 18th Senatorial district.
- January 6, 1976: Terry Tranter is appointed to the 24th House district.

== Senate ==
=== Leadership ===
==== Majority leadership ====
- President of the Senate: John W. Brown
- President pro tempore of the Senate: Oliver Ocasek
- Assistant pro tempore: Morris Jackson

==== Minority leadership ====
- Leader: Michael Maloney
- Assistant Leader: Paul Gillmor
- Whip: Buz Lukens

=== Members of the 111th Ohio Senate ===
| District | Senator | Party | First elected |
|---|---|---|---|
| 1 | M. Ben Gaeth | Republican | 1974 |
| 2 | Paul Gillmor | Republican | 1967 |
| 3 | Ted Gray | Republican | 1967 |
| 4 | Buz Lukens | Republican | 1971 (Appt.) |
| 5 | Neal Zimmers | Democratic | 1974 |
| 6 | Tony P. Hall | Democratic | 1972 |
| 7 | Michael Maloney | Republican | 1967 |
| 8 | Stanley Aronoff | Republican | 1967 |
| 9 | Bill Bowen | Democratic | 1970 (Appt.) |
| 10 | Max Dennis | Republican | 1967 |
| 11 | Marigene Valiquette | Democratic | 1969 (Appt.) |
| 12 | Walter White | Republican | 1972 |
| 13 | Don Pease | Democratic | 1974 |
| 14 | Bill Mussey | Republican | 1972 |
| 15 | Robert O'Shaughnessy | Democratic | 1972 (Appt.) |
| 16 | Donald L. Woodland | Democratic | 1972 |
| 17 | Oakley C. Collins | Republican | 1974 |
| 18 | David W. Johnson | Republican | 1975 (Appt.) |
| 19 | Tom Van Meter | Republican | 1972 |
| 20 | Robert Secrest | Democratic | 1968 |
| 21 | Morris Jackson | Democratic | 1967 |
| 22 | Anthony O. Calabrese | Democratic | 1967 |
| 23 | Charles L. Butts | Democratic | 1974 |
| 24 | Jerome Stano | Democratic | 1974 (Appt.) |
| 25 | Anthony J. Celebrezze Jr. | Democratic | 1974 |
| 26 | Gene Slagle | Democratic | 1972 |
| 27 | Oliver Ocasek | Democratic | 1967 |
| 28 | Dave Headley | Democratic | 1972 |
| 29 | Robert D. Freeman | Democratic | 1974 |
| 30 | Kinsey Milleson | Democratic | 1974 |
| 31 | Tim McCormack | Democratic | 1974 |
| 32 | Tom Carney | Democratic | 1972 |
| 33 | Harry Meshel | Democratic | 1970 |

== House of Representatives ==
=== Leadership ===
==== Majority leadership ====
- Speaker of the House: Vern Riffe
- President pro tempore of the Senate: Barney Quilter
- Floor Leader: Bill Mallory
- Assistant Floor Leader: Patrick Sweeney
- Majority Whip: Tom Carney

==== Minority leadership ====
- Leader: Charles F. Kurfess
- Assistant Leader: Norman Murdock
- Whip: Alan Norris

=== Members of the 111th Ohio House of Representatives ===
| District | Representative | Party | First elected |
|---|---|---|---|
| 1 | Eugene Branstool | Democratic | 1974 |
| 2 | John Wargo | Democratic | 1970 |
| 3 | Jim Betts | Republican | 1974 |
| 4 | Rocco Colonna | Democratic | 1974 |
| 5 | Francine Panehal | Democratic | 1974 |
| 6 | Patrick Sweeney | Democratic | 1967 |
| 7 | Ken Rocco | Democratic | 1972 |
| 8 | Ed Feighan | Democratic | 1972 |
| 9 | Troy Lee James | Democratic | 1967 |
| 10 | Thomas M. Bell | Democratic | 1972 |
| 11 | Robert Jaskulski | Democratic | 1970 |
| 12 | Donna Pope | Republican | 1972 (Appt.) |
| 13 | Ike Thompson | Democratic | 1970 |
| 14 | Arthur Brooks | Democratic | 1974 |
| 15 | John Thompson | Democratic | 1970 |
| 16 | Harry Lehman | Democratic | 1970 |
| 17 | Virginia Aveni | Democratic | 1972 |
| 18 | Dennis Eckart | Democratic | 1974 |
| 19 | Richard Finan | Republican | 1972 |
| 20 | John Brandenberg | Republican | 1972 |
| 21 | Norman Murdock | Republican | 1966 |
| 22 | Chester Cruze | Republican | 1968 |
| 23 | William L. Mallory Sr. | Democratic | 1966 |
| 24 | Terry Tranter | Democratic | 1976 (Appt.) |
| 25 | James Rankin | Democratic | 1970 |
| 26 | Helen Fix | Republican | 1972 |
| 27 | Alan Norris | Republican | 1966 |
| 28 | Bill O'Neil | Republican | |
| 29 | William Kopp | Democratic | 1972 |
| 30 | Mike Stinziano | Democratic | 1972 |
| 31 | Phale Hale | Democratic | 1966 |
| 32 | James Baumann | Democratic | 1970 |
| 33 | Mack Pemberton | Republican | 1966 |
| 34 | Ed Orlett | Democratic | 1972 |
| 35 | Tom Fries | Democratic | 1970 |
| 36 | C.J. McLin | Democratic | 1966 |
| 37 | Paul Leonard | Democratic | 1972 |
| 38 | Fred Young | Republican | 1968 |
| 39 | Vernon Cook | Democratic | 1972 |
| 40 | Paul Wingard | Republican | 1974 |
| 41 | Kenneth Cox | Democratic | 1972 |
| 42 | Pete Crossland | Democratic | 1972 |
| 43 | Ronald Weyandt | Democratic | 1971 (Appt.) |
| 44 | Irma Karmol | Republican | 1974 |
| 45 | Casey Jones | Democratic | 1968 |
| 46 | Arthur Wilkowski | Democratic | 1969 (Appt.) |
| 47 | Barney Quilter | Democratic | 1966 |
| 48 | Dick Maier | Republican | 1972 |
| 49 | Irene Smart | Democratic | 1972 |
| 50 | William J. Healy | Democratic | 1974 |
| 51 | Tom Gilmartin | Democratic | 1972 |
| 52 | George D. Tablack | Democratic | 1970 (Appt.) |
| 53 | Leo Camera | Democratic | 1968 |
| 54 | Scribner Fauver | Republican | 1974 |
| 55 | Bob Nader | Democratic | 1970 |
| 56 | Michael Del Bane | Democratic | 1968 |
| 57 | Bill Donham | Republican | 1972 |
| 58 | Michael A. Fox | Democratic | 1974 |
| 59 | Joe Tulley | Republican | 1967 |
| 60 | David Hartley | Democratic | |
| 61 | Sherrod Brown | Democratic | 1974 |
| 62 | Marcus Roberto | Democratic | 1970 |
| 63 | John Scott | Republican | 1968 |
| 64 | Waldo Rose | Republican | 1972 |
| 65 | Frank H. Mayfield | Republican | 1968 (Appt.) |
| 66 | Larry Hughes | Republican | 1968 |
| 67 | Larry Christman | Democratic | |
| 68 | John Johnson | Democratic | 1970 |
| 69 | John Galbraith | Republican | 1966 |
| 70 | David Johnson | Democratic | 1978 |
| 71 | Ron Gerberry | Democratic | 1974 |
| 72 | Ethel Swanbeck | Republican | 1967 |
| 73 | Corwin Nixon | Republican | 1967 |
| 74 | Dennis Wojtanowski | Democratic | 1974 |
| 75 | Charles R. Saxbe | Republican | 1974 |
| 76 | Harry Turner | Republican | 1972 |
| 77 | Bob McEwen | Republican | 1974 |
| 78 | Rodney Hughes | Republican | 1967 |
| 79 | Fred Hadley | Republican | 1967 |
| 80 | Dale Locker | Democratic | 1972 |
| 81 | Bob Netzley | Republican | 1967 |
| 82 | Michael Oxley | Republican | 1972 |
| 83 | Charles Kurfess | Republican | 1967 |
| 84 | Fred Deering | Democratic | 1972 |
| 85 | Gene Damschroder | Republican | 1972 |
| 86 | Walter McClaskey | Republican | 1972 |
| 87 | Harry Mallott | Democratic | 1972 |
| 88 | Myrl Shoemaker | Democratic | 1967 |
| 89 | Vern Riffe | Democratic | 1967 |
| 90 | Don Maddux | Democratic | 1968 |
| 91 | Claire Ball | Republican | 1972 |
| 92 | Ron James | Democratic | 1974 |
| 93 | William G. Batchelder | Republican | 1968 |
| 94 | Rex Kieffer Jr. | Republican | 1972 |
| 95 | Sam Speck | Republican | 1970 |
| 96 | William Hinig | Democratic | 1967 |
| 97 | Robert Boggs | Democratic | 1972 |
| 98 | Arthur Bowers | Democratic | 1968 |
| 99 | A.G. Lancione | Democratic | 1967 |

Appt.- Member was appointed to current House Seat

== See also ==
- Ohio House of Representatives membership, 126th General Assembly
- Ohio House of Representatives membership, 125th General Assembly
- List of Ohio state legislatures
