= Ohio's 52nd House of Representatives district =

American legislative district

Ohio's 52nd State House of Representatives district
Representative
Gayle Manning; R–North Ridgeville
- Population (2020): 118,043

Ohio's 52nd House of Representatives district is currently represented by Republican Gayle Manning. It is located entirely within Lorain County and includes the cities of Avon, Elyria, and North Ridgeville.

== List of members representing the district ==
Member	Party	Years	General Assembly	Electoral history
District established January 2, 1967.
George Mastics (Cleveland)	Republican	January 2, 1967 – December 31, 1972	107th 108th 109th	Elected in 1966. Re-elected in 1968. Re-elected in 1970; Redistricted to the 3rd district.
George D. Tablack (Campbell)	Democratic	January 7, 1973 – December 31, 1976	110th 111th	Redistricted from the 82nd district and re-elected in 1972. Re-elected in 1974. Retired.
Joseph Vukovich (Poland)	Democratic	January 2, 1977 – December 31, 1992	112th 113th 114th 115th 116th 117th 118th 119th	Elected in 1976. Re-elected in 1978. Re-elected in 1980. Re-elected in 1982. Re-elected in 1984. Re-elected in 1986. Re-elected in 1988. Re-elected in 1990. Retired.
Sally Perz (Toledo)	Republican	January 2, 1993 – September 14, 1999	120th 121st 122nd 123rd	Elected in 1992. Re-elected in 1994. Re-elected in 1996. Re-elected in 1998. Resigned to take a position with the University of Toledo.
Vacant		September 14, 1999 – October 20, 1999	123rd	
Jim Mettler (Toledo)	Republican	October 20, 1999 – December 31, 2000	123rd	Appointed to finish Perz's term. Lost re-election.
Teresa Fedor (Toledo)	Democratic	January 7, 2001 – December 31, 2002	124th	Elected in 2000. Retired to run for state senator.
Mary Cirelli (Canton)	Democratic	January 5, 2003 – December 31, 2004	125th	Redistricted from the 54th district and re-elected in 2002. Lost renomination.
William J. Healy II (Canton)	Democratic	January 2, 2005 – December 31, 2007	126th 127th	Elected in 2004. Re-elected in 2006. Resigned after winning election for Mayor of Canton.
Vacant		December 31, 2007 – March 11, 2008	127th	
Stephen Slesnick (Canton)	Democratic	March 11, 2008 – December 31, 2012	127th 128th 129th	Appointed to finish Healy's term. Re-elected in 2008. Re-elected in 2010. Redistricted to the 49th district.
Margaret Conditt (Liberty Township)	Republican	January 6, 2013 – September 8, 2017	130th 131st 132nd	Redistricted from the 55th district and re-elected in 2012. Re-elected in 2014. Re-elected in 2016. Resigned.
Vacant		September 8, 2017 – September 13, 2017	132nd	
George Lang (West Chester)	Republican	September 13, 2017 – December 31, 2020	132nd 133rd	Appointed to finish Conditt's term. Re-elected in 2018. Retired to run for state senator.
Jennifer Gross (West Chester)	Republican	January 3, 2021 – December 31, 2022	134th	Elected in 2020. Redistricted to the 45th district.
Gayle Manning (North Ridgeville)	Republican	January 2, 2023 – present	135th	Redistricted from the 55th district and re-elected in 2022.

== Election results ==
=== 2020 ===
Democratic primary
Party	Candidate	Votes	%
Democratic	Chuck Horn	5,121	100.0
Total votes		5,121	100.0

Republican primary
Party	Candidate	Votes	%
Republican	Jennifer Gross	5,382	51.9
Republican	Mark Welch	4,997	48.1
Total votes		10,379	100.0

General Election, 2020
Party	Candidate	Votes	%
Republican	Jennifer Gross	44,953	63.34%
Democratic	Chuck Horn	26,019	36.66%
Total votes		70,972	100.0
Republican hold			

=== 2018 ===
Democratic Primary
Party	Candidate	Votes	%
Democratic	Kathy Wyenandt	3,123	100%
Total votes		3,123	100%

Republican Primary
Party	Candidate	Votes	%
Republican	George Lang (Incumbent)	7,479	100%
Total votes		7,479	100%

2018 General Election
Party	Candidate	Votes	%
Republican	George Lang (Incumbent)	31,866	58.38%
Democratic	Kathy Wyenandt	22,720	41.62%
Total votes		54,586	100%
Republican hold			
