= Ohio's 3rd House of Representatives district =

American legislative district

Ohio's 3rd State House of Representatives district
Representative
Ismail Mohamed; D–Columbus
- Population (2020): 119,267

Ohio's 3rd House of Representatives district is currently represented by Democrat Ismail Mohamed. It is located entirely within Franklin County and includes part of Columbus.

== List of members representing the district ==
Member	Party	Years	General Assembly	Electoral history
District established January 2, 1967.
Vaughn Stocksdale (Greenville)	Democratic	January 2, 1967 – December 31, 1968	107th	Elected in 1966. Retired.
Jack P. Oliver (Arcanum)	Republican	January 6, 1969 – December 31, 1972	108th 109th	Elected in 1968. Re-elected in 1970. Redistricted to the 80th district and lost re-election.
George Mastics (Cleveland)	Republican	January 7, 1973 – December 31, 1974	110th	Redistricted from the 52nd district and re-elected in 1972. Retired to run for U.S. Representative.
Jim Betts	Republican	January 6, 1975 – December 31, 1980	111th 112th 113th	Elected in 1974. Re-elected in 1976. Re-elected in 1978. Retired to run for U.S. Senate.
Jim Petro (Rocky River)	Republican	January 5, 1981 – December 31, 1982	114th	Elected in 1980. Redistricted to the 6th district.
John D. Shivers Jr. (Columbiana)	Democratic	January 3, 1983 – May 23, 1990	115th 116th 117th 118th	Elected in 1982. Re-elected in 1984. Re-elected in 1986. Re-elected in 1988. Appointed to Columbiana County Common Pleas Court judge.
Sean D. Logan (Salem)	Democratic	May 23, 1990 – December 31, 2000	118th 119th 120th 121st 122nd 123rd	Appointed to finish Shivers' term. Re-elected in 1990. Re-elected in 1992. Re-elected in 1994. Re-elected in 1996. Re-elected in 1998. Term-limited.
Chuck Blasdel (East Liverpool)	Republican	January 1, 2001 – December 31, 2002	124th	Elected in 2000. Redistricted to the 1st district.
Jim Carmichael (Wooster)	Republican	January 6, 2003 – December 31, 2008	125th 126th 127th	Redistricted from the 7th district and re-elected in 2002. Re-elected in 2004. Re-elected in 2006. Term-limited.
Ron Amstutz (Wooster)	Republican	January 5, 2009 – December 31, 2012	128th 129th	Elected in 2008. Re-elected in 2010. Redistricted to the 1st district.
Tim Brown (Grand Rapids)	Republican	January 7, 2013 – July 30, 2016	130th 131st	Elected in 2012. Re-elected in 2014. Resigned to become President of the Toledo Metropolitan Area Council of Governments.
Vacant		July 30, 2016 – August 2, 2016	131st	
Theresa Gavarone (Bowling Green)	Republican	August 2, 2016 – February 6, 2019	131st 132nd 133rd	Appointed to finish Brown's term. Re-elected in 2016. Re-elected in 2018. Appointed to state senate.
Vacant		February 6, 2019 – March 27, 2019	133rd	
Haraz Ghanbari (Perrysburg)	Republican	March 27, 2019 – December 31, 2022	133rd 134th	Appointed to finish Gavarone's term. Re-elected in 2020. Redistricted to the 75th district.
Ismail Mohamed (Columbus)	Democratic	January 2, 2023 – present	135th	Elected in 2022.
