= Ohio Legislative Black Caucus =

- Formation: 1967; 59 years ago
- Headquarters: Columbus, Ohio
- Members: During the 135 General Assembly: 4 Senators; 13 Representatives
- President: Terrence Upchurch
- Website: Official website

The Ohio Legislative Black Caucus (OLBC), formally known as the Black Elected Democrats of Ohio, is an American political organization now composed of African Americans elected to the Ohio General Assembly. The Ohio Legislative Black Caucus is the oldest legislative black caucus in the nation.

== Purpose ==
The purpose for establishing OLBC was to recognize and address the hopes, aspirations and needs of African Americans in Ohio. The organization continues to help ensure equality for all citizens by promoting, fostering and sponsoring educational, civic and political initiatives. Its primary focus is public policy advocacy and development, as well as, significant involvement in state and national electoral politics.

== History ==
The first African American man elected to the Ohio House of Representatives was George Washington Williams in 1880, followed by John Patterson Green's election to the Ohio Senate in 1892. Unlike in many parts of the United States, African Americans in the Ohio House of Representatives have had one of the longest-running presences in any state legislature in the United States, being present in the House in every decade with a few interruptions since 1880; the Illinois House of Representatives has had the longest uninterrupted streak of African American members since 1882.

The Ohio Legislative Black Caucus was founded in 1967 by African American state legislators under the leadership of State Representative C.J. McLin of Dayton, Ohio. At that time, the organization was known as BEDO (Black Elected Democrats of Ohio). Along with McLin, Rep. William Mallory, Rep. Bill Bowen, Rep. Phale Hale, Rep. Thomas Hill, Sen. Morris Jackson, Rep. Troy Lee James, and Rep. Larry Smith also helped establish the organization. The organization's structure and purpose was subsequently duplicated in at least 32 other states in the following years.

Since its establishment, the OLBC has been joined by African American women, starting with Helen Rankin in 1978 in the House and Rhine McLin in 1994 in the Ohio Senate.

== Mission and vision ==
The Ohio Legislative Black Caucus seeks to promote, foster, and sponsor education, civic, and political activities that enrich and improve African American communities across the state of Ohio through the efforts of the members of Ohio Legislative Black Caucus. This is further accomplished through active legislation in the statehouse and community partnerships with other elected officials and constituents in and around the districts we represent.

Over the past 50 years, the members of the Ohio Legislative Black Caucus have been on the front lines of issues important to African Americans in Ohio. The caucus has listed reformation of the criminal justice system, voting rights, healthcare, poverty and education as top priorities.

== Current membership ==
List of officers:

District	Officers	Position	Chamber Position
(D - Cleveland) House District 20	Terrence Upchurch	President	None
(D - Cincinnati) Senate District 9	Catherine Ingram	1st VP	None
(D - Cincinnati) House District 26	Sedrick Denson	2nd VP	None
(D - Columbus) House District 1	Dontavius Jarrells	Treasurer	Ohio House Assistant Minority Leader
(D - Columbus) House District 2	Latyna Humphrey	Secretary	None
(D - Columbus) Senate District 15	Hearcel Craig	Sgt. of Arms	Ohio State Senate Assistant Minority Leader
(D - Akron) Senate District 28	Vernon Sykes	Parliamentarian	None

=== Non-officer members ===
- Ohio House of Representatives Assistant Minority Whip Tavia Galonski (D-Akron)
- Ohio State Senate Assistant Minority Whip Paula Hicks-Hudson (D-Toledo)
- Ohio State Rep. Munira Abdullahi (D-Huber Ridge)
- Ohio State Rep. Willis Blackshear (D-Dayton)
- Ohio State Rep. Juanita Brent (D-Cleveland)
- Ohio State Rep. Darnell Brewer (D-Cleveland)
- Ohio State Rep. Ismail Mohamed (D-Columbus)
- Ohio State Rep. Phil Robinson (D-Solon)
- Ohio State Rep. Elgin Rogers, Jr. (D-Toledo)
- Ohio State Rep. Cecil Thomas (D-Cincinnati)
