= Ohio's 2nd House of Representatives district =

American legislative district

Ohio's 2nd State House of Representatives district
Representative
| Latyna Humphrey; D–Columbus |
- Population (2020): 121,167

Ohio's 2nd House of Representatives district is currently represented by Democrat Latyna Humphrey. It is located entirely within Franklin County and includes the city of Whitehall and part of Columbus.

== List of members representing the district ==
| Member | Party | Years | General Assembly | Electoral history |
|---|---|---|---|---|
District established January 2, 1967.
| Robert Wilhelm (Van Wert) | Republican | January 2, 1967 – December 31, 1972 | 107th 108th 109th | Elected in 1966. Re-elected in 1968. Re-elected in 1970. Redistricted to the 79th district and lost renomination. |
| John Wargo (Franklin) | Democratic | January 1, 1973 – December 31, 1982 | 110th 111th 112th 113th 114th | Redistricted from the 34th district and re-elected in 1972. Re-elected in 1974. Re-elected in 1976. Re-elected in 1978. Re-elected in 1980. Retired to run for Columbiana County Commissioner. |
| Ross Boggs (Andover) | Democratic | January 3, 1983 – December 31, 1992 | 115th 116th 117th 118th 119th | Elected in 1982. Re-elected in 1984. Re-elected in 1986. Re-elected in 1988. Re-elected in 1990. Redistricted to the 5th district. |
| George E. Terwilleger (Hamilton) | Republican | January 4, 1993 – December 31, 2000 | 120th 121st 122nd 123rd | Elected in 1992. Re-elected in 1994. Re-elected in 1996. Re-elected in 1998. Term-limited. |
| Tom Raga (Deerfield) | Republican | January 1, 2001 – December 31, 2002 | 124th | Elected in 2000. Redistricted to the 67th district. |
| Jon Peterson (Delaware) | Republican | January 6, 2003 – December 31, 2008 | 125th 126th 127th | Redistricted from the 80th district and re-elected in 2002. Re-elected in 2004. Re-elected in 2006. Term-limited. |
| Kris Jordan (Dublin) | Republican | January 5, 2009 – December 31, 2010 | 128th | Elected in 2008. Retired to run for state senator. |
| Andrew Brenner (Powell) | Republican | January 3, 2011 – December 31, 2012 | 129th | Elected in 2010. Redistricted to the 67th district. |
| Mark Romanchuk (Ontario) | Republican | January 7, 2013 – December 31, 2020 | 130th 131st 132nd 133rd | Elected in 2012. Re-elected in 2014. Re-elected in 2016. Re-elected in 2018. Term-limited; ran for state senator. |
| Marilyn John (Shelby) | Republican | January 3, 2021 – December 31, 2022 | 134th | Elected in 2020. Redistricted to the 76th district. |
| Latyna Humphrey (Columbus) | Democratic | January 2, 2023 – present | 135th | Redistricted from the 26th district and re-elected in 2022. |
