= John Weis =

John Weis may refer to:

- John Weis (politician), member of the Ohio House of Representatives
- John Ellsworth Weis, American painter

== See also ==
- John Weiss, American author and clergyman
