= Panno =

Panno may refer to:

- James R. Panno (c.1922–1970), member of the Ohio House of Representatives
- Oscar Panno (born 1935), Argentine chess Grandmaster
- Panno (typeface), a Latin sans-serif typeface designed by Pieter van Rosmalen for South Korean road signs
