= Ohio's 18th senatorial district =

American legislative district

Ohio's 18th State Senate district
Senator
Jerry Cirino; R–Kirtland
- Demographics: 80.5% White; 9.2% Black; 4.3% Hispanic; 4.1% Asian; 1.5% Native American; 0.1% Hawaiian/Pacific Islander
- Population (2020) • Voting age • Citizens of voting age: 371,394; 298,899; 282,519

After the 2023 redistricting Ohio's 18th senatorial district comprises Lake County and the part of Cuyahoga County along the Lake Shore and along the Western area of metropolitan Cleveland The senate district is made up of the 60, 61, and 98 House Districts.

The current senator is Republican Jerry Cirino.

== Historically ==
Before the 2023 Redistricting) the district has been established in northeastern Ohio, primarily along the shore of Lake Erie. It consisted of Portage County and portions of Cuyahoga, Lake and Geauga counties. It encompasses Ohio House districts 61, 75 and 76. It has a Cook PVI of R+4.

== List of senators ==
Senator	Party	Term	Notes
William W. Taft	Republican	January 3, 1967 – December 31, 1972	Taft did not seek re-election in 1972.
Anice Johnson	Republican	January 3, 1973 – April 21, 1975	Resigned in 1975 for health reasons prior to the expiration of her term.
David W. Johnson	Republican	April 22, 1975 – December 31, 1976	Johnson lost re-election in 1976 to Marcus Roberto.
Marcus Roberto	Democrat	January 3, 1977 – December 31, 1982	Roberto sought election instead to the 28th District in 1982.
Robert Boggs	Democrat	January 3, 1983 – December 31, 1996	Boggs did not seek re-election in 1996.
Bob Gardner	Republican	January 3, 1997 – December 31, 2004	Gardner was term-limited in 2004.
Tim Grendell	Republican	January 3, 2005 – September 18, 2011	Grendell resigned in 2011 to become a judge on the Geauga County Court of Common Pleas.
John Eklund	Republican	November 18, 2011 – December 31, 2020	Eklund was term-limited in 2020.
Jerry Cirino	Republican	January 4, 2021 – present	Incumbent
