= Michael Gamble =

Michael Gamble may refer to:

- Michael Gamble (1907-1992), an American politician
- Michael Gamble (1994), an American soccer player
