= Hofstetter =

Hofstetter or Hoffstetter is a German surname. Notable people with this surname include the following:

- Daniel Hofstetter (born 1992), German footballer
- Edwin Hofstetter (1918–2006), American politician
- Gaspar Hoffstetter, Slovenian politician
- Hugo Hofstetter (born 1994), French cyclist
- Jim Hoffstetter (1937–2006), Luxembourgish footballer
- Mario Richard Hofstetter, designer of the Hofstetter Turbo car
- Mary E. Hofstetter, Canadian arts administrator and educator
- Rachell Hofstetter (also known as Valkyrae) (born 1992), American YouTuber and streamer
- Robert Hoffstetter (1908–1999), French taxonomist and herpetologist
- Roman Hoffstetter or Hofstetter (1742–1815), German monk and composer
- Steve Hofstetter (born 1979), American author, columnist and comedian
