= Ralph L. Humphrey =

American politician

Member of the Ohio House of Representatives from the Ashtabula County district
- In office January 3, 1961-April 11, 1961
- Preceded by: Howard Fortney
- Succeeded by: E. W. Lampson
- In office January 3, 1949-December 31, 1952
- Preceded by: Gilbert Myers
- Succeeded by: Howard V. Shaylor

Personal details
- Born: March 17, 1908 Plymouth, Ohio
- Died: April 11, 1961 (aged 53) Columbus, Ohio
- Party: Republican

Ralph L. Humphrey (March 17, 1908 – April 11, 1961) was a member of the Ohio House of Representatives, serving Ashtabula County from 1949 to 1952, and again in 1961. He also served in the Ohio Senate from 1953 to 1960. He died on April 11, 1961, while in office.
