= Howard V. Shaylor =

American politician

Member of the Ohio House of Representatives from the Ashtabula County district
- In office January 3, 1953 – December 31, 1958
- Preceded by: Ralph L. Humphrey
- Succeeded by: Howard Fortney

Personal details
- Born: July 21, 1891 Ashtabula, Ohio, U.S.
- Died: February 20, 1973 (aged 81) Ashtabula, Ohio, U.S.
- Party: Republican

Howard V. Shaylor (July 21, 1891 – February 20, 1973) was a member of the Ohio House of Representatives, serving Ashtabula County from 1953 to 1958.
