= Ralph B. Kohnen =

American politician (1935–2008)

Ralph Kohnen

Member of the Ohio House of Representatives from the 67th district
- In office January 3, 1963 – January 15, 1968
- Preceded by: None (First)
- Succeeded by: Frank H. Mayfield

Personal details
- Born: October 22, 1935 Cincinnati, Ohio
- Died: January 31, 2008 (aged 72) Cincinnati, Ohio
- Party: Republican

Ralph B. Kohnen, Jr. (October 22, 1935 – January 31, 2008) was a former member of the Ohio House of Representatives.
