= Albert Sealy =

American politician

Member of the Ohio House of Representatives from the 84th district
- In office January 3, 1967 – December 31, 1968
- Preceded by: None (First)
- Succeeded by: Fred Young

Personal details
- Born: October 23, 1917 Columbus, Ohio
- Died: August 3, 2008 (aged 90) Waterbury, Connecticut
- Party: Republican

Albert H. Sealy, Jr. (October 23, 1917 – August 3, 2008) was a member of the Ohio House of Representatives. Sealy graduated from Ohio State University and received his law degree from Harvard Law School. He practiced law and was an adjutant professor of public policy at Ohio State University.
