= Ron James (politician) =

American politician

Member of the Ohio House of Representatives from the 92nd district
- In office January 3, 1975 – December 31, 1984
- Preceded by: Oakley C. Collins
- Succeeded by: Mark Malone

Personal details
- Born: 1948 or 1949 (age 77–78)
- Party: Democratic

Ron James is a former member of the Ohio House of Representatives.
