= Robert Wilhelm (politician) =

American politician

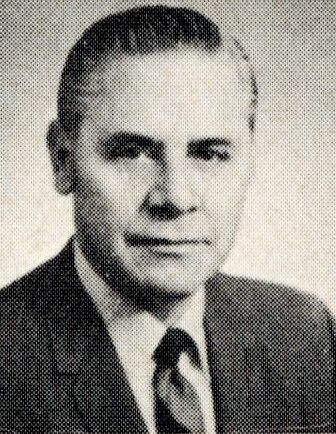

Member of the Ohio House of Representatives
- In office January 3, 1967 – December 31, 1972
- Preceded by: District created
- Succeeded by: John Wargo
- Constituency: 2nd district
- In office January 5, 1965 – December 31, 1966
- Preceded by: Martin Feigert
- Succeeded by: District abolished
- Constituency: Van Wert County

Personal details
- Born: November 5, 1925 Wabash, Indiana
- Died: April 19, 1991 (aged 65) Columbus, Ohio
- Party: Republican

Robert L. Wilhelm (1925–1991) was a Republican politician who served in the Ohio General Assembly. A former employee of both Kroger and the United Telephone Company, Wilhelm initially ran to represent Van Wert County in the Ohio House of Representatives in 1964, and won a seat. When the Voting Rights Act of 1965 initiated legislative districts in 1966, Wilhelm won reelected to represent the newly drawn Second District. He ran unopposed for a third term in 1968, and won a fourth term in 1970.

In 1972, redistricting put Wilhelm in the same district as Representative Fred Hadley. With neither of them wanting to move or retire, they went on to face each other in the primary election for the Republican nomination. In the end, Hadley defeated Wilhelm, successfully ending his time in the legislature.

Following his defeat, Wilhelm served in the private sector, and publicly as a member of the Ohio state lottery commission. He died in 1991.
