= James B. Hagan =

American politician (1923–1988)

Member of the Ohio House of Representatives from the 99th district
- In office January 3, 1967 – December 31, 1968
- Preceded by: None (first)
- Succeeded by: Michael Del Bane

Personal details
- Born: December 9, 1923 Youngstown, Ohio
- Died: June 10, 1988 (aged 64) Columbus, Ohio
- Party: Democratic
- Spouse: Elsie I. Schaffer (1848–1988; his death)
- Children: Ronald, Glenn, James B., Jr.

James B. Hagan, Sr. (1923–1988) was a member of the Ohio House of Representatives. He had also served as a trustee in Liberty Township, where he resided.

He died of heart disease in 1988 in a hotel in Columbus, where he had been staying to attend a granddaughter's high school graduation.

His brother Robert Hagan and nephews Robert F. Hagan and Timothy Hagan also served in various political offices in Ohio.
