= Walter Rutkowski =

American politician

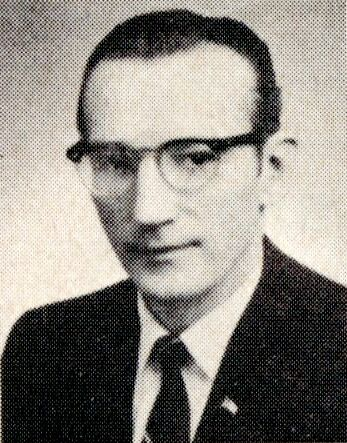

Member of the Ohio House of Representatives from the 57th district
- In office January 3, 1969-December 31, 1972
- Preceded by: Frank Pokorny
- Succeeded by: District Relocated to Franklin County

Personal details
- Born: March 28, 1917
- Died: August 8, 1975 (aged 58) Warrensville Heights, Ohio
- Party: Democratic

Walter A. Rutkowski (March 28, 1917 – August 8, 1975) was a member of the Ohio House of Representatives.
