= Joan Douglass =

American politician (1924–2016)

Member of the Ohio House of Representatives from the 61st district
- In office January 3, 1973 – December 31, 1974
- Preceded by: Richard Christiansen
- Succeeded by: Sherrod Brown

Personal details
- Born: February 9, 1924 Mansfield, Ohio, U.S.
- Died: January 20, 2016 (aged 91) Mansfield, Ohio, U.S.
- Party: Republican
- Spouse: Lawrence A. Douglass
- Children: 3

Martha Joan Douglass (February 9, 1924 — January 20, 2016) was an American political figure who served in the Ohio House of Representatives. She lost in 1974 to future United States Senator Sherrod Brown.

Joan Douglass died in Mansfield's independent living community The Waterford at the age of 91.
