= Paul Wingard =

American politician

Member of the Ohio House of Representatives from the 40th district
- In office January 3, 1975 – December 31, 1976
- Preceded by: Claude Fiocca
- Succeeded by: Thomas C. Sawyer

Personal details
- Born: 1930 Akron, Ohio, U.S.
- Died: June 11, 2014 (aged 84) Brighton, Tennessee, U.S.
- Party: Republican

Paul Sidney Wingard (1930 – June 11, 2014) was an American politician and member of the Ohio House of Representatives.
