= Michael Gamble (politician) =

American politician

Michael P. Gamble

Member of the Ohio House of Representatives from the 89th district
- In office January 3, 1967 – December 31, 1968
- Preceded by: None (First)
- Succeeded by: Ross Heintzelman

Personal details
- Born: May 4, 1907
- Died: November 4, 1992 (aged 85)
- Party: Democratic

Michael P. Gamble (May 4, 1907 – November 4, 1992) was an Ohio Democratic Party politician and a member of the Ohio General Assembly. Formerly a Canton City Councilman, Gamble was elected to the Ohio House of Representatives in 1966. A member of the 107th Ohio General Assembly, Gamble was a member of the first state legislature following redistricting from the 1965 Voting Rights Act. In 1968, Gamble lost reelection to Ross Heintzelman, cutting his House tenure to a single term.

Returning to Canton, he was elected as city treasurer, and served for a number of years. He also served as an alternative delegate for the 1972 Democratic National Convention. Gamble died in 1992, at the age of 85.
