= Frank W. King =

American politician

Frank King

Member of the Ohio Senate from the 11th district
- In office January 3, 1959 – January 13, 1969
- Preceded by: District Created
- Succeeded by: Marigene Valiquette

Personal details
- Born: April 24, 1912
- Died: April 28, 1988 (aged 76) Columbus, Ohio
- Party: Democratic

Frank W. King (April 24, 1912 – April 28, 1988) was a Democratic Leader and member of the Ohio Senate. He represented the 11th District, consisting of the majority of Toledo, Ohio, from January 3, 1967, to January 13, 1969.
