= Frank Mills (politician) =

American politician (1904–1969)

Member of the Ohio House of Representatives from the 86th district
- In office January 3, 1967 – November 11, 1969
- Preceded by: None (First)
- Succeeded by: James Pippenger

Personal details
- Born: March 20, 1904
- Died: November 11, 1969 (aged 65) Dayton, Ohio
- Party: Republican

Frank Mills (March 20, 1904 – November 11, 1969) was a former member of the Ohio House of Representatives. He died while in office in 1969.
