= John McDonald (Ohio politician) =

American politician

Member of the Ohio House of Representatives from the 19th district
- In office January 3, 1965-December 31, 1970
- Preceded by: None (at-large Districts)
- Succeeded by: Raymond Luther

Personal details
- Born: 1934 or 1935 (age 90–91)
- Party: Democratic

John McDonald is a Democratic politician who formerly served in the Ohio General Assembly. An attorney, McDonald was originally elected to the Ohio House of Representatives in 1964, and was reelected in 1966. McDonald rose quickly in the ranks of his caucus, serving as minority whip in only his second term. When Frank Pokorny resigned from the House in 1968, McDonald replaced him as minority leader. He again won reelection in 1968.

In 1970, McDonald, still House minority leader, opted to forgo a fourth term to run for Ohio Attorney General. However, he lost the Democratic nomination to William J. Brown, who would go on to be the longest serving attorney general in Ohio history. As a result, McDonald would no longer hold public office by the end of 1970.

However, following John Gilligan's win as Ohio Governor the same year, McDonald was named as his legislative director. He served in this capacity throughout 1972.

Following his time as the Governor's counsel, McDonald returned to private practice, and has occasionally taught at Capital University and the Ohio State University. He currently is a partner with Schottenstein, Zox and Dunn in Columbus, Ohio.
