= Rex Kieffer Jr. =

American politician

Rex Kieffer

Member of the Ohio House of Representatives from the 94th district
- In office January 3, 1973 – December 31, 1978
- Preceded by: David Weissert
- Succeeded by: Jim Ross

Personal details
- Born: May 8, 1929
- Died: October 26, 2001 (aged 72)
- Party: Republican

Rex Kieffer (May 8, 1929 – October 26, 2001) was a member of the Ohio House of Representatives.
