= Thomas Rentschler =

American politician

Member of the Ohio House of Representatives from the 40th district
- In office January 3, 1967 – December 31, 1970
- Preceded by: District created
- Succeeded by: Tom Kindness

Personal details
- Born: August 23, 1932 Hamilton, Ohio, U.S.
- Died: October 25, 2016 (aged 84) Hamilton, Ohio, U.S.
- Party: Republican

Thomas Beckett Rentschler (August 23, 1932 – October 25, 2016) was a member of the Ohio House of Representatives. Rentschler was a graduate of Haverford College in Pennsylvania, and a veteran of the U.S. Navy. He was chairman and CEO of Citizens Bank for more than 30 years. He died after a short illness at a hospice in Hamilton, Ohio in 2016.
