= Donald Nowack =

American politician (1924–2008)

Donald R. Nowack

Member of the Ohio House of Representatives from the 45th district
- In office January 3, 1967-December 31, 1970
- Preceded by: District established
- Succeeded by: Robert Jaskulski

Personal details
- Born: February 23, 1924 Cleveland, Ohio
- Died: January 7, 2008 (aged 83) Sagamore Hills Township, Summit County, Ohio
- Party: Democratic

Donald R. Nowack (February 23, 1924 – January 7, 2008) was a former member of the Ohio House of Representatives.
