= John Sweeney (Ohio politician) =

American politician (1924–2016)

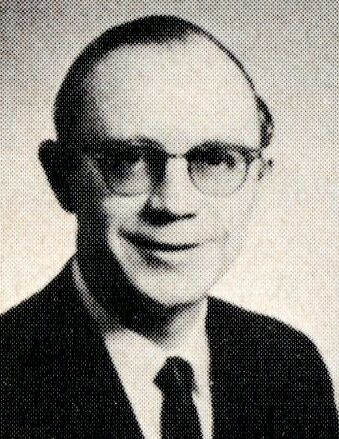

Member of the Ohio House of Representatives from the 14th district
- In office January 3, 1971-December 31, 1974
- Preceded by: Allen J. Bartunek
- Succeeded by: Arthur Brooks

Personal details
- Born: May 13, 1924
- Died: December 13, 2016 (aged 92)
- Party: Democratic

John G. Sweeney (May 13, 1924 – December 13, 2016) was an American politician who was a member of the Ohio House of Representatives. He died on December 13, 2016, at the age of 92.
