= Robert Carpenter (American politician) =

American politician

Member of the Ohio House of Representatives from the 15th district
- In office January 3, 1967-December 31, 1970
- Preceded by: Districts Established
- Succeeded by: Paul Pfeifer

Personal details
- Born: July 28, 1909
- Died: August 25, 1979 (aged 70) Tiffin, Ohio
- Party: Republican

Robert Carpenter (July 28, 1909 – August 25, 1979) was a member of the Ohio House of Representatives.
