= Clarence Wetzel =

American politician

Member of the Ohio House of Representatives from the 34th district
- In office January 3, 1949 – December 31, 1970
- Preceded by: District created
- Succeeded by: John Wargo

Personal details
- Born: February 24, 1899
- Died: June 4, 1972 (aged 73) Salem, Ohio, United States
- Party: Republican

Clarence Wetzel (February 24, 1899 – June 1972) was a member of the Ohio House of Representatives. Hailing from Columbiana, Ohio, Wetzel was a longtime politician. He ran for Ohio's 18th congressional district in 1952. He was defeated in 1970 by John Wargo.
