= Thomas M. Bell (Ohio politician) =

American politician

Member of the Ohio House of Representatives from the 10th district
- In office January 3, 1973 – December 31, 1982
- Preceded by: Larry G. Smith

Personal details
- Born: Cleveland, Ohio, U.S.
- Party: Democratic
- Children: 3
- Parent: James H. Bell (father)
- Education: Glenville High School
- Profession: Politician, businessman

Thomas M. Bell is an American politician and businessman from Cuyahoga County, Ohio who served in the Ohio House of Representatives from 1973 to 1982, representing the 10th legislative district of Ohio as a Democrat from the 110th to 114th Ohio General Assemblies.

== Early life ==
Bell was born in Cleveland, Ohio. He graduated from Glenville High School.

== Career ==
Bell was elected to the Ohio General Assembly while in his early 20s. He served from 1973 to 1982, representing the 10th legislative district of Ohio as a Democrat from the 110th to 114th Ohio General Assemblies.

Bell's voting record of 44.1% was the worst among Democrats in the Ohio General Assembly. He stopped seeking re-election in 1982.

Following his time in office, Bell lived in Columbus, Ohio until his father died in 1988, after which Bell returned to Cleveland to take over his father's business, the Metropolitan Security Service. Bell sold the business and moved back to Columbus in 1991, where he worked in the office of the state auditor until early 1996.

== Personal life ==
Bell is married and has three children.

Ohio House of Representatives
Preceded by Larry G. Smith	Member of the Ohio House of Representatives from the 10th district 1973–1982	Succeeded by —
