= Edwin Hofstetter =

American politician

Member of the Ohio House of Representatives from the 36th district
- In office January 3, 1967 – December 31, 1968
- Preceded by: District Created
- Succeeded by: James I. Hunt

Personal details
- Born: August 12, 1918 Huntsburg, Ohio
- Died: March 6, 2006 (aged 87) Chardon, Ohio
- Party: Republican

Edwin Thomas Hofstetter (August 12, 1918 – March 8, 2006) was a former member of the Ohio House of Representatives.
