= James R. Panno =

American politician

James Panno

Member of the Ohio House of Representatives from the 82nd district
- In office January 3, 1965 – June 9, 1970
- Preceded by: Constituency created
- Succeeded by: George D. Tablack

Personal details
- Born: c.1922
- Died: June 9, 1970 (aged 48) Cleveland, Ohio, U.S.
- Party: Democratic

James R. Panno (c. 1922 – June 9, 1970) was an American politician who served as a member of the Ohio House of Representatives for the 82nd district from 1965 to 1970.
