= John Weis (politician) =

American politician

John Harvey Weis

Member of the Ohio House of Representatives from the 25th district
- In office January 3, 1967-December 31, 1968
- Preceded by: District established
- Succeeded by: Don Maddux

Personal details
- Party: Republican

John Harvey Weis (December 5, 1911 – October 17, 1992) was a member of the Ohio House of Representatives.
