= Claire Ball =

American politician and attorney (1941–2019)

Member of the Ohio House of Representatives from the 91st district
- In office January 3, 1973 – December 31, 1982
- Preceded by: Ralph Welker
- Succeeded by: Jolynn Boster

Personal details
- Born: October 4, 1941 Athens, Ohio, U.S.
- Died: April 7, 2019 (aged 77) Columbus, Ohio, U.S.
- Party: Republican
- Education: Ohio University (BBA, MBA); Ohio State University (JD)

Claire M. "Buzz" Ball Jr. (October 4, 1941 – April 7, 2019) was an American attorney and politician who served as a member of the Ohio House of Representatives from 1973 to 1982.

== Early life and education ==
Ball was born in Athens, Ohio and graduated from Athens High School. He earned a Bachelor of Business Administration and Master of Business Administration from Ohio University, followed by a Juris Doctor from the Ohio State University Moritz College of Law.

== Career ==
Ball began his career as a congressional aide to Ohio Congressman Clarence E. Miller. He later served as the prosecuting attorney of Athens County, Ohio. He was elected to the Ohio House of Representatives in 1972 and assumed office in 1973. During his tenure, Ball drafted legislation to create municipal courts in Hocking and Jackson Counties. He also secured a special subsidy for the Heritage College of Osteopathic Medicine. After leaving the House in 1982, Ball served as a member of the Ohio Workers Compensation Regional Board of Review, nominated by Governor Jim Rhodes.
