= Allen J. Bartunek =

American politician

Allen Bartunek

Member of the Ohio House of Representatives from the 54th district
- In office January 3, 1967 – December 31, 1970
- Preceded by: At Large
- Succeeded by: John Sweeney

Personal details
- Born: June 12, 1928
- Died: February 1, 1997 (aged 68)
- Party: Republican

Allen Bartunek (June 12, 1928 – February 1, 1997) was a member of the Ohio House of Representatives.
