= Richard Christiansen (politician) =

American politician

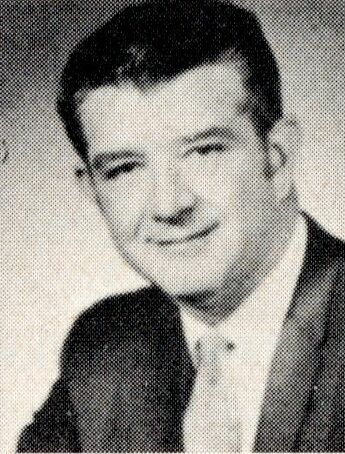

Member of the Ohio House of Representatives from the 17th district
- In office January 3, 1967 – December 31, 1972
- Preceded by: Districts Established
- Succeeded by: Joan Douglass

Personal details
- Born: August 21, 1928 Wisconsin, United States
- Died: November 10, 2001 (aged 73) Mansfield, Ohio, United States
- Party: Democratic

Richard M. Christiansen (August 21, 1928 – November 10, 2001) was a member of the Ohio House of Representatives.
