= E. W. Lampson =

American politician

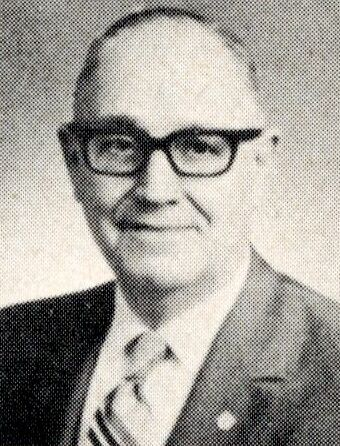

Member of the Ohio House of Representatives from the 38th district
- In office January 3, 1963-December 31, 1972
- Preceded by: Ralph L. Humphrey
- Succeeded by: Robert Boggs

Personal details
- Born: May 17, 1904 Jefferson, Ohio, US
- Died: October 5, 1997 (aged 93) Punta Gorda, Florida, US
- Resting place: Oakdale Cemetery, Jefferson
- Party: Republican
- Spouse: Doris Leona Durey
- Children: one
- Education: Miami University of Ohio

Elbert Wellington 'Ab' Lampson (May 17, 1904 – October 5, 1997) was an American politician who was a member of the Ohio House of Representatives.

Lampson, a native of Ashtabula County, was the son of E.C. "Chet" and Pearle Evans Lampson. His grandfather was Ohio Lieutenant Governor, Elbert L. Lampson.

Politics was important to Lampson, who served 10 years in the Ohio House of Representatives. He was chairman of the House Ways and Means Committee when the first state income tax was passed in 1970. He convinced 12 fellow Republicans to cross party lines and join minority Democrats in passing the legislation. The decision later was reaffirmed in a referendum vote by Ohio citizens.

After that term, he retired from the General Assembly. During his first term in the General Assembly in 1963, he was voted one of six outstanding freshman legislators by a bipartisan board.

Mr. Lampson lived most of his life in Jefferson, Ohio, and moved to Florida in 1979. He graduated from Miami University in Oxford, Ohio in 1927. He was a two-year letterman on the college track team, winning medals in the Drake Medley Relays in 1926.

During his early years in Jefferson, he became active in numerous organizations, being the youngest man to hold the top office of the Jefferson Masonic Lodge. He also organized and was a charter member of the Jefferson Exchange Club. He was a volunteer firefighter, Jefferson Grange member and past patron of the Sunshine Chapter of the Order of the Eastern Star. He also was a member of Ashtabula Elks Lodge 208, Sons of the American Revolution and the Ashtabula County Historical Society. He also was active with the Ashtabula County Fair, serving as fair board secretary from 1938 to 1946. He was director of the board for several additional years.

A desire for bigger, better fairs in Ashtabula County led him to an active role in the Ohio Fair Managers Association, which he served as president from 1947 to 1949. He was the only Ashtabula County native to serve in that organization.

Lampson joined Gazette Newspapers, a family business, in 1927. Among its publications are the Jefferson Gazette, the Conneaut Courier and the Pymatuning Valley Area News. Mr. Lampson was active in newspaper organizations, and served as past president of the Buckeye Press Association, and as trustee, president and chairman of the board of the Ohio Newspaper Association. He served the latter group from 1951 to 1976.

In 1953, Mr. Lampson helped found the Jefferson Development Corp., of which he was a director for 30 years. He also served as a precinct committeeman, a member of the County GOP Executive Committee and was, from 1942 to 1954, a member of the Ashtabula County Board of Elections.

In 1966, the Jefferson Chamber of Commerce named Mr. Lampson "Outstanding Citizen of the Year." He was the first second-generation family member to be so honored, his father, Chet, having received the honor in 1952.

Source: Obituary, Ashtabula Star Beacon, Oct. 8 1997
