= Kenneth Creasy =

American politician

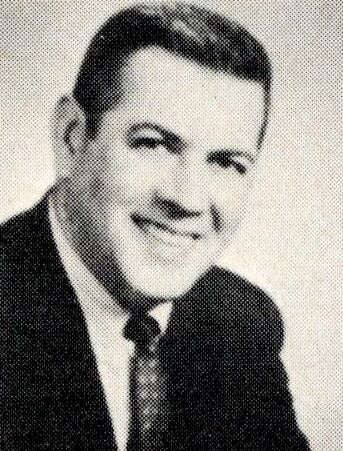

Member of the Ohio House of Representatives from the 18th district
- In office January 3, 1958-December 31, 1972
- Preceded by: January 3, 1968, 18th District established
- Succeeded by: Harry Turner

Personal details
- Party: Republican

Kenneth Burton Creasy (October 7, 1932 – June 16, 1992) was a member of the Ohio House of Representatives.

== Early life ==
Kenneth B. Creasy grew up in Turkey Creek, Kentucky, the oldest son of a coal miner. In 1940 his family moved to Delaware, Ohio so his father, John Samuel Creasy, could take advantage of factory work in Central Ohio. His mother, Pauline Hammond Creasy, worked briefly as a court recorder in Union County, Kentucky, where her father was a judge. The economic difference between Pauline and John posed a problem for Pauline's father; the couple secretly wed in 1931, and made the marriage public only after Pauline became pregnant with Kenneth a year later.

The extended Creasy family's experience in the coal mines, including the death of Kenneth's grandfather in a mine collapse, led to his lifelong interest in improving conditions for coal miners and their communities, in education, and in assisting children caught in the poverty cycle.

Creasy credited much of his political success to his participation on the high school debate team, coached by Mrs. Doris Evans, with whom Creasy maintained a lifelong friendship. He attended Ohio Wesleyan University on a debate scholarship from 1951to 1955, winning two national debate titles during his time on the OWU debate team, coached by Dr. Roy Diem.

Creasy became the first international president of Circle K International (the student service organization of Kiwanis) from 1953 to 1954. He was a member of Phi Delta Kappa fraternity, and was elected student body president at Ohio Wesleyan from 1954 to 1955.

== Career ==
After a year of graduate school at Ohio State University, he successfully ran for City Council while teaching social studies (and serving as speech and debate coach) at Olentangy High School. In 1958, at age 26, he became the Ohio House of Representatives' youngest member.serving from 1958 to 1972.

As chairman of the state welfare committee in the House of Representatives, he authored Medicaid and food stamp legislation that expanded aid to Ohio residents. As chairman of the Natural Resources Committee, Creasy launched Ohio's state park system and authored Ohio's 1972 law requiring strip mining companies to reclaim land damaged by surface mining, paving the way for the national Surface Mining and Reclamation Act of 1977

. After seven terms in the Ohio House of Representatives, Creasy retired and resumed his career as an educator, teaching social studies and government at Rutherford B. Hayes High School. In 1977, at age 44, Creasy was named Director of the Ohio Department of Public Welfare, where he served until his retirement. After retiring, he was elected a Delaware County Commissioner, and served in this post until he died unexpectedly of a heart attack in 1992.

== Personal life ==
Creasy married his high school sweetheart Juddean Ferguson. They had two daughters, author/professor Kenda Creasy Dean, a United Methodist pastor, and music professor/novelist Kathy Creasy Mittelman.
