= Ronald Weyandt =

American politician (1935–2003)

Ron Weyandt
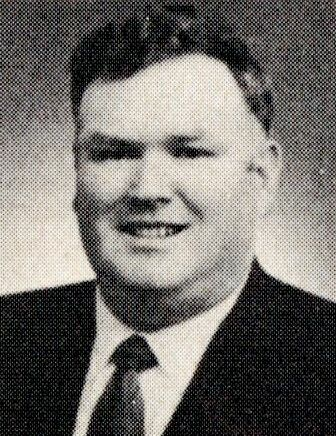

Member of the U.S. House of Representatives from Ohio's 43rd district
- In office January 13, 1971 – December 31, 1976
- Preceded by: John Poda
- Succeeded by: Cliff Skeen

Member of the Ohio House of Representatives

Personal details
- Born: March 7, 1935 Akron, Ohio, United States
- Died: January 10, 2003 (aged 67) Akron, Ohio, United States
- Party: Democratic

Ronald H. Weyandt (March 7, 1935 – January 10, 2003) was a former member of the Ohio House of Representatives.
