= David Holcomb =

American politician

Member of the Ohio Senate from the 6th district
- In office January 3, 1967 – December 31, 1972
- Preceded by: Inaugural holder
- Succeeded by: Tony P. Hall

Personal details
- Party: Republican

David Holcomb was a U.S. State Senator in the Ohio Senate. He served from January 3, 1967 – December 31, 1972. In 1970, he ran unsuccessfully for the Republican nomination for U.S. Senator.
