= Morris Boyd =

American politician

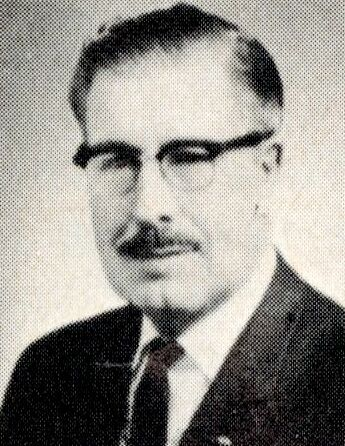

Member of the Ohio House of Representatives from the 93rd district
- In office January 3, 1967 – December 31, 1972
- Preceded by: None (First)
- Succeeded by: Vernon Cook

Personal details
- Born: September 6, 1905 Auxvasse, Missouri
- Died: February 10, 1986 (aged 80) Hudson, Ohio
- Party: Republican

Morris Boyd (June 9, 1905 – February 10, 1986) was a former member of the Ohio House of Representatives.
