= Carlton Davidson =

American politician

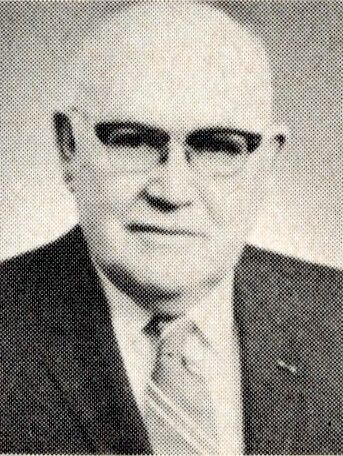

Member of the Ohio House of Representatives from the 26th district
- In office January 3, 1961 – December 31, 1972
- Preceded by: District established
- Succeeded by: Oakley C. Collins

Personal details
- Born: June 26, 1905 Ohio, United States
- Died: July 20, 1984 (aged 79) Ironton, Ohio, United States
- Party: Republican

Carlton E. Davidson (June 26, 1905 – July 20, 1984) was a member of the Ohio House of Representatives.
