= James Flannery (Ohio politician) =

American politician

Jim Flannery
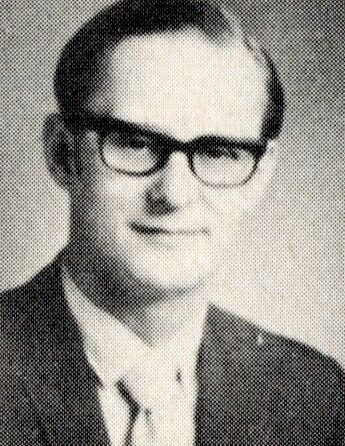

Member of the Ohio House of Representatives from the 48th district
- In office January 3, 1967 – December 31, 1972
- Preceded by: At Large District
- Succeeded by: Ed Feighan

Personal details
- Born: October 31, 1938
- Died: March 4, 2005 (aged 66) Westlake, Ohio
- Party: Democratic

James J. Flannery (October 31, 1938 – March 4, 2005) was a member of the Ohio House of Representatives.
