= Doris Jones (politician) =

American politician

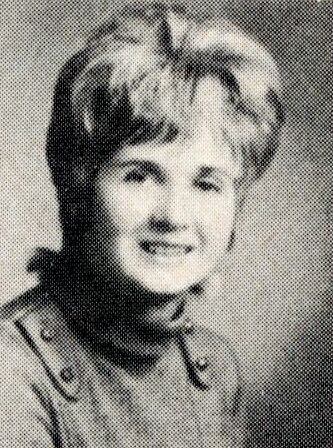

Member of the Ohio House of Representatives from the 62nd district
- In office January 15, 1969-December 31, 1972
- Preceded by: Robert C. Jones
- Succeeded by: Mike Stinziano

Personal details
- Party: Republican

Doris J. Jones is a former member of the Ohio House of Representatives.
