= Ralph Welker =

American politician

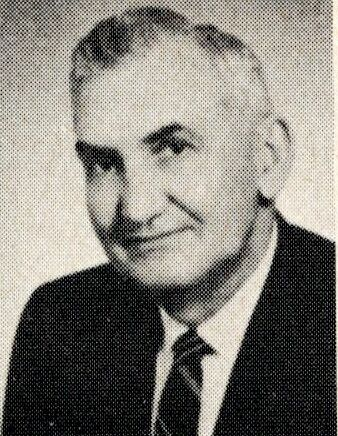

Member of the Ohio House of Representatives from the 27th district
- In office January 3, 1967 – December 31, 1972
- Preceded by: District established
- Succeeded by: Claire Ball

Personal details
- Born: March 8, 1911
- Died: September 13, 1981 (aged 70) Jackson, Ohio
- Party: Republican

Ralph Q. Welker (March 8, 1911 – September 13, 1981) was a member of the Ohio House of Representatives.
