= John Poda =

American politician

Member of the Ohio Senate from the 28th district
- In office January 13, 1971-December 31, 1972
- Preceded by: William B. Nye
- Succeeded by: David Headley

Member of the Ohio House of Representatives from the 97th district
- In office January 3, 1967-January 13, 1971
- Preceded by: None (First)
- Succeeded by: Ronald Weyandt

Personal details
- Born: 1936 or 1937 (age 89–90)
- Party: Democratic

John Merle Poda Jr. (born 1936 or 1937) is an American politician from Ohio who served as a member of the Ohio General Assembly for the Democratic Party. A public relations officer by trade, Poda's father was a member of the Ohio House of Representatives for a number of years.

Poda initially served as a Summit County Commissioner, but in 1966, after the Voting Rights Act of 1965 mitigated legislative districts represented by a single individual, Poda returned to the House of Representatives. He won reelection in 1968 and 1970.

In 1971, Ohio Governor John J. Gilligan chose state Senator William B. Nye as a member of his cabinet, causing a vacancy in the Ohio Senate. As a result, Poda sought and attained an appointment, and was sworn into the state Senate on January 14, 1971. However, citing the want to be closer to family more often, Poda decided not to run for a full term in the Senate, and was replaced by David Headley in 1973.

In 1974, Poda ran for Summit County Auditor and won. However, in 1981, Poda was charged with receiving illegal campaign contributions. Following the incident Poda continued to serve as auditor, and eventually recovered politically from the damage. After Summit County revised their government to delete the office of auditor, Poda left office. He has not held elected office since.
