= Anthony Russo (Ohio politician) =

American politician

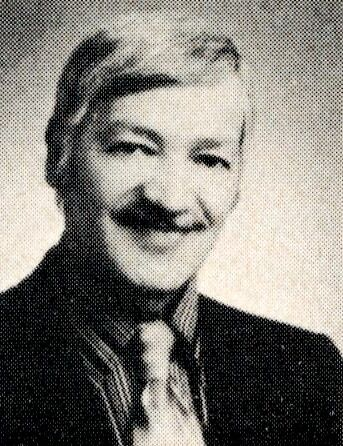

Member of the Ohio House of Representatives from the 43rd district
- In office January 3, 1967-December 31, 1972
- Preceded by: District established
- Succeeded by: Virginia Aveni

Personal details
- Born: January 1, 1920
- Died: March 6, 1985 (aged 65) Cleveland, Ohio, United States
- Party: Democratic

Anthony J. Russo (January 1, 1920 – March 6, 1985) was a member of the Ohio House of Representatives. He left office after his district was redistricted to be the home of two different Democratic incumbents, in a move aimed at removing him from office.
