= Robert Manning (politician) =

American politician (1927–2006)

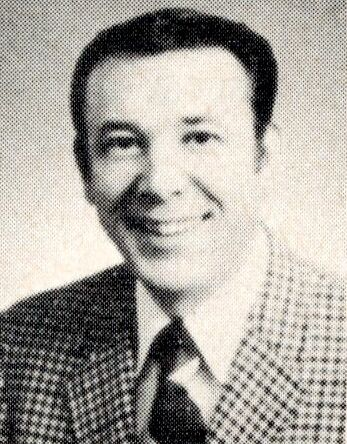

Member of the Ohio House of Representatives from the 94th district
- In office January 3, 1967-December 31, 1972
- Preceded by: None (First)
- Succeeded by: Pete Crossland

Personal details
- Born: June 30, 1927 Manchester, Kentucky
- Died: August 24, 2006 (aged 79) Ohio, United States
- Party: Republican

Robert A. Manning (June 30, 1927 – August 24, 2006) was a member of the Ohio House of Representatives.
