= Frank Pokorny =

American attorney and politician

Frank Robert Pokorny

Member of the Ohio House of Representatives from the 57th district
- In office January 1, 1965 – January 30, 1968
- Succeeded by: Joseph S. Cloonan

Member of the Ohio House of Representatives from the Cuyahoga County district
- In office January 1, 1963 – December 31, 1964

Member of the Ohio House of Representatives from Ohio
- In office January 1, 1957 – December 31, 1960

Personal details
- Born: July 10, 1923 Cleveland, Ohio, U.S.
- Died: January 30, 1999 (aged 75) Naples, Florida, U.S.
- Party: Democratic
- Spouse: Dorothy Redway Pokorny
- Children: 3
- Education: John Carroll University (BA) Cleveland State University (JD)

Military service
- Branch/service: United States Army
- Unit: 51st Field Artillery Battalion, 6th Infantry Division
- Battles/wars: World War II

Frank Robert Pokorny (July 10, 1923 – January 30, 1999) was an American attorney and politician who served as a member of the Ohio House of Representatives of the U.S. state of Ohio. He represented Cuyahoga County from 1957 to 1961, and again from 1963 to 1965. After redistricting and the establishment of state districts (rather than county allocation), he represented District 57. He was appointed to the Cuyahoga County Board of Commissioners after the death of the incumbent, and served from February 1968 to April 1976. He resigned from office on April 12, 1976, after being indicted for misconduct of office. He pled guilty, and never served in public office again.

== Early life ==
Frank Robert Pokorny was born July 10, 1923, in Cleveland, Ohio, to Frank J. and Anna B. Pokorny. His father was a Hungarian émigré who later served in the Ohio House of Representatives during World War II. He had a sister, Irene.

He graduated from John Adams High School in Cleveland and then attended John Carroll University, graduating with a bachelor's degree in accounting and becoming an actuary. Drafted into the United States Army during World War II, he served in the 51st Field Artillery Battalion of the 6th Infantry Division and saw battle in both the Philippines and South Korea.

== Career ==
After leaving the military, Pokorny returned to Cleveland. He joined his father on the Hungarian Radio Hour on WCSB, which his father had produced and directed since 1948. He also enrolled at the Cleveland–Marshall College of Law, graduating with his J.D. degree in 1955.

=== Ohio House of Representatives ===
In 1956, Pokorny ran for the Democratic nomination for state representative from Cuyahoga County. (Note: At the time, the Ohio state constitution apportioned the state's 99 representatives by giving each county one representative. The remaining representatives were apportioned to the counties on the basis of population. This was known as the "Hanna amendment" to the constitution, which was enacted in 1903 at the urging of U.S. Senator Mark Hanna, who led the state's politically dominant Republican political machine.) Pokorny came in fifth (the top 18 vote-getters qualified for the nomination), with 22,570 votes. He subsequently won the November election.

Pokorny won re-election in November 1958, coming in fifth (the top 18 vote-getters were elected) with 22,202 votes. He was elected chair of the Ohio House Committee on Government Organization for the 103rd Ohio General Assembly.

Pokorny declined to run for re-election to the Ohio House in 1960, instead seeking to challenge Democratic incumbent Frank S. Day for Cuyahoga County Recorder. Pokorny lost to Day in a three-way primary on May 4, 1960, by 13,000 votes. Pokorny then tried to broker a deal whereby he would become deputy clerk of Ohio House, but this fell through. Instead, in January 1961 Pokorny took a position as administrative assistant to Ohio House Minority Leader James A. Lantz. The part-time position paid $500 a month through the end of the legislative session.

In May 1962, Pokorny sought the Democratic nomination for the Ohio House again. The Cuyahoga County Democratic Party declined to endorse him in the primary. Pokorny came in 14th (the top 17 vote-getters qualified for the nomination), with 32,696 votes. He won election to Ohio House again on November 7, 1962, coming in fifth (the top 17 vote-getters were elected to office) with 230,452 votes.

Pokorny declined to run for re-election in 1964, instead seeking to challenge incumbent Cuyahoga County Recorder Mark McElory. McElroy defeated him in the Democratic primary election in May by about 2,200 votes. However, in June, State Senator Joseph W. Bartunek resigned from office to run for a judgeship of on the Cuyahoga County Probate Court. State Representative Anthony F. Novak resigned from Ohio House to run for Bartunek's seat. The Cuyahoga County Democratic Committee then nominated Pokorny to run for Novak's seat. He won election to Ohio House again on November 4, 1964, coming in sixth (the top 17 vote-getters were elected to office) with 320,036 votes.

In June 1964, the Supreme Court of the United States ruled in Reynolds v. Sims, 377 U.S. 533 (1964) that state legislature districts had to be roughly equal in population. A case challenging the "Hanna amendment" reached the Supreme Court at about the same time as Reynolds v. Sims. On June 22, 1964, the Supreme Court held Ohio's method for apportioning representatives (but not state senators) to be in violation of the Constitution per the decision in Reynolds v. Sims. On remand, the United States District Court for the Northern District of Ohio ordered the state legislature to adopt a new apportionment scheme to comply with the holding in Nolan v. Rhodes. Elections under the new apportionment scheme were first held in November 1966, for terms to begin per the Ohio constitution on the first day in January 1967.

Pokorny, who had been elected chairman of the Democratic caucus of Cuyahoga County state house representatives, was assigned to the new House District 57. He won the Democratic primary in May 1966 by a vote of 4,195 to 1,848 for his closest challenger, Joseph S. Cloonan, in a four-way election.

Pokorny easily won reelection in November 1966, 21,127 to 14,204 for Republican challenger P. S. Hamilton. Democrats had won just 37 of the 99 seats in the Ohio House, and Pokorny immediately launched a bid to be elected Minority Leader. Pokorny was narrowly elected Minority Leader on November 22 over incumbent Minority leader A. G. Lancione, 19 to 18.

=== Cuyahoga County commission ===
On January 10, 1968, Cuyahoga County Commissioner Henry Speeth (a Democrat) died at the age of 60 from a heart attack. Under state law, Speeth's political party was empowered to choose his successor to fill the remainder of his term. On January 19, 1968, the Cuyahoga County Democratic Committee chose Frank R. Pokorny as Speeth's successor. Pokorny resigned from the Ohio House on January 30, receiving a standing ovation. He took the oath of office as Cuyahoga County Commissioner on February 2, 1968. Joseph S. Cloonan was appointed Pokorny's successor. Cloonan lost to fellow Democrat Walter A. Rutkowski in the general election in November 1968.

On November 5, 1968, Pokorny easily won election as Cuyahoga County Commissioner with 63,366 votes. His nearest competitor, Republican Paul W. Cassidy, had just 50,295 votes.

=== Congressional campaigns ===
Pokorny entered the 1970 Democratic primary to challenge Rep. William Edwin Minshall, Jr. in Ohio's 23rd congressional district, but withdrew in order to give fellow Democrat Ronald M. Mottl a clear run against Minshall.

Pokorny ran for two offices in the May 1972 Democratic primary. He ran for the Democratic nomination for Ohio Senate District 24, but lost to Mottl, 20,199 to 12,188. However, Pokorny also ran for re-election as Cuyahoga County Commissioner. He was unopposed in the primary. Corrigan easily won re-election on November 7, 1972, beating Republican challenger Nicholas Daria by a wide margin (246,868 to 66,661).

In 1974, Ohio Governor John J. Gilligan asked Pokorny to run for Ohio Secretary of State, but Pokorny declined. Pokorny considered running for Lieutenant Governor and for Congress in the 23rd congressional district the same year, but decided against it.

=== Resignation ===
In 1975, a Cuyahoga County grand jury began probing whether Pokorny had committed ethical improprieties while county commissioner. The Plain Dealer broke news of the investigation on February 27, 1976. On April 13, the grand jury indicted Pokorny on a single charge of misconduct in office. Prosecutors alleged that Pokorny had owned stock in Personal Transportation, Inc., a school bus company which won a county busing contract that lasted from 1971 to 1975. Pokorny then sold his stock on April 8, 1973, for $14,600. The grand jury declined to indict Pokorny for accepting kickbacks from an architect who sought a county job. He was the first Cuyahoga County commissioner to be indicted in 44 years.

Pokorny resigned as Cuyahoga County Commissioner on April 12, 1976. The following day, he pled guilty to the charge of misconduct in office. He paid a $400 fine and court costs, agreed to forfeit his office.

=== Later career ===
In April 1976, Pokorny took a position as a director of the United Labor Agency, a social welfare organization sponsored by the Ohio AFL-CIO, the Teamsters union, and the United Auto Workers.

Since Pokorny's crime was merely a misdemeanor, he was not barred under Ohio law from seeking public office again. In 1978, he publicly announced he would run again for the Cuyahoga County Commission. But his announcement generated such extreme media criticism that he never formally filed for the race. In February 1980, he resigned from the United Labor Agency and took a job as a realtor and announced he would run for Cuyahoga County Commissioner. He lost the Democratic primary to Tim Hagan by 34,000 votes, coming in third. In 1982, Pokorny ran for Cuyahoga County Auditor, and lost the Democratic primary to incumbent Tim McCormack by 3,000 votes.

=== Retirement and death ===
Pokorny moved to Naples, Florida, in 1990. He suffered a stroke in late January 1999, and died at National Health Center on January 30, 1999.

== Personal life ==
Pokorny married Dorothy Priscilla Redway of Cleveland on June 18, 1949. The couple had three children: Frank R. (born about 1950), Thomas J. (born about 1952), and Laura A. (born about 1954). Early in his legislative career, Pokorny lived in Shaker Heights, but by 1960 had moved to Independence, Ohio.

His son, Thomas J. Pokorny, became a lawyer and served for many years as a judge on the Cuyahoga County Court of Common Pleas.
