= Thomas E. Hill (politician) =

American politician

Tom Hill

Member of the Ohio House of Representatives from the 41st district
- In office January 3, 1967 – December 31, 1970
- Preceded by: District established
- Succeeded by: Ike Thompson

Personal details
- Party: Democratic

Tom Hill is a former member of the Ohio House of Representatives, serving from 1967 to 1970.

== Biography ==
Other than being a politician, Thomas Hill was also a painter, painter, and worked for Cook Coffee Company. Hill attended West Virginia State University and Case Western Reserve University. He had 3 children with his wife, Eloise Hill.

Before becoming a state representative, he took part in local politics and community organizations. Namely:

- Sixth District Citizens Committee
- the Glenville Area Council
- the Metropolitan Civil Association
- the Glenville Civic Association
- the 27th Ward Democratic Club
- National Association for the Advancement of Colored People
- political action club CHAMPS
- Young Men's Christian Association

In 1966, he won the state legislature election in the 41st district of the Ohio House of Representatives, and served from 1967 to 1970.
