= Howard Knight (politician) =

American politician

Howard A. Knight
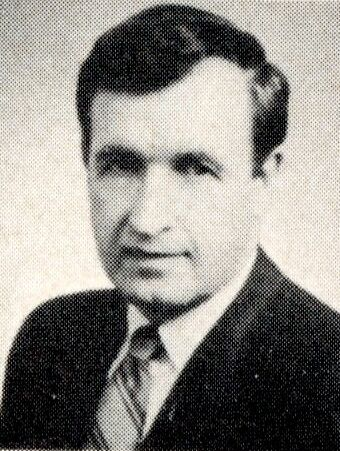

Member of the Ohio House of Representatives from the 13th district
- In office January 3, 1963 – December 31, 1972
- Preceded by: Districts Created
- Succeeded by: Fred Deering

Personal details
- Born: December 22, 1926 Royal Oak, Michigan
- Died: November 6, 2002 (aged 75) Fremont, Ohio
- Party: Republican

Howard Allen Knight (December 22, 1926 – November 6, 2002) was a member of the Ohio House of Representatives.

== Background ==
Knight worked in Insurance and his office was based in Fremont, Ohio. He was a state representative from 1963 to 1972.
