= Lloyd Kerns =

American politician

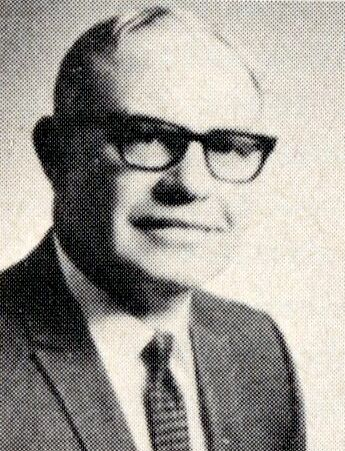

Member of the Ohio House of Representatives from the 16th district
- In office January 3, 1967 – December 31, 1972
- Preceded by: District established
- Succeeded by: Walter McClaskey

Personal details
- Born: April 27, 1921 Union County, Ohio, United States
- Died: September 7, 1986 (aged 65) Raymond, Ohio, United States
- Party: Republican

Lloyd George Kerns (April 27, 1921 – September 7, 1986) was a member of the Ohio House of Representatives.
