= David Weissert =

American politician

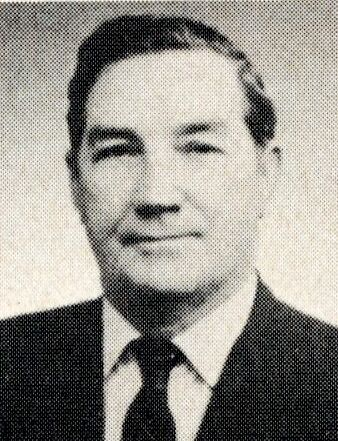

Member of the Ohio House of Representatives from the 28th district
- In office January 3, 1967 – December 31, 1972
- Preceded by: District established
- Succeeded by: Rex Kieffer Jr.

Personal details
- Born: February 6, 1913
- Died: September 25, 1989 (aged 76)
- Party: Republican

David Weissert (February 6, 1913 – September 25, 1989) was a member of the Ohio House of Representatives.
