= Anice Johnson =

American politician

Member of the Ohio Senate from the 18th district
- In office January 3, 1973 – April 21, 1975
- Preceded by: William W. Taft
- Succeeded by: David W. Johnson

Member of the Ohio House of Representatives from the 35th district
- In office January 3, 1969 – December 31, 1970
- Preceded by: Joseph Kainrad
- Succeeded by: Marcus Roberto

Personal details
- Party: Republican

Anice Wismer Johnson (February 22, 1919 – January 22, 1992) is a former member of the Ohio Senate. She represented the 18th District, which encompassed much of Northeastern Ohio. She served from 1973 to 1975. Prior to this, she was a member of the Ohio House of Representatives.
