= James Thorpe (Ohio politician) =

American politician

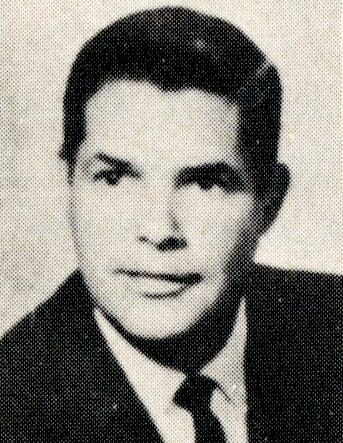

Member of the Ohio House of Representatives from the 50th district
- In office January 3, 1967 – December 31, 1974
- Preceded by: None (First)
- Succeeded by: William J. Healy

Personal details
- Born: October 28, 1927 Alliance, Ohio, United States
- Died: March 28, 2007 (aged 79) Alliance, Ohio, United States
- Party: Republican

James E. Thorpe (October 28, 1927 – March 28, 2007) was a former member of the Ohio House of Representatives.
