= Walter Paulo =

American politician

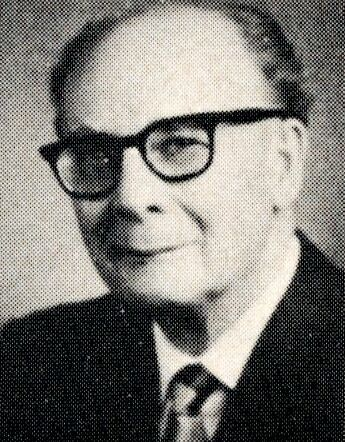

Member of the Ohio House of Representatives from the 83rd district
- In office January 3, 1967-December 31, 1972
- Preceded by: None (First)
- Succeeded by: Tom Carney

Personal details
- Born: March 6, 1906 Mansfield, Ohio
- Died: December 12, 1984 (aged 82) Canfield, Ohio
- Party: Republican

Walter H. Paulo (March 6, 1902 – December 12, 1984) was a member of the Ohio House of Representatives.
