= Robert Levitt =

American politician (1926–1998)

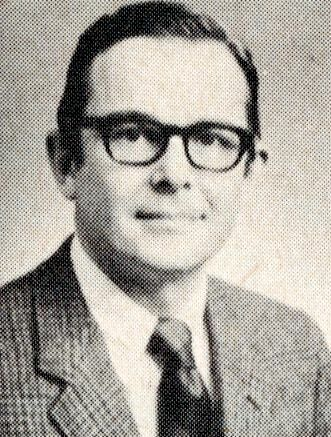

Member of the Ohio House of Representatives from the 70th district
- In office January 3, 1963-December 31, 1974
- Preceded by: None (First)
- Succeeded by: David W. Johnson

Personal details
- Born: November 1, 1926 Hollywood, California
- Died: September 9, 1998 (aged 71) Canton, Ohio
- Party: Republican

Robert Elwood Levitt (November 1, 1926 – September 9, 1998) was a member of the Ohio House of Representatives.
