= Michael Del Bane =

American politician

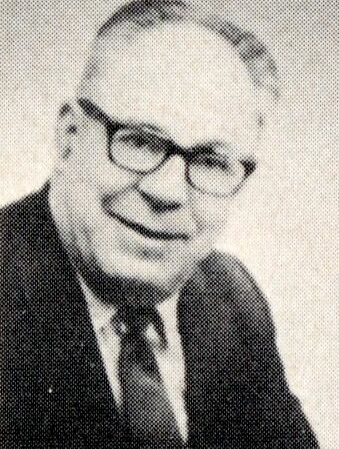

Member of the Ohio House of Representatives from the 56th district
- In office January 3, 1969-December 31, 1980
- Preceded by: James B. Hagan
- Succeeded by: Joe Williams

Personal details
- Born: February 24, 1918 Hubbard, Ohio
- Died: November 8, 1984 (aged 66) Hubbard, Ohio
- Party: Democratic

Michael Del Bane (February 24, 1918 – November 8, 1984) was a Democratic member of the Ohio House of Representatives and chairman of the Public Utilities Commission. Del Bane was awarded the Phillips Medal of Public Service in 1980. He died of cancer at the age of 66.
