= Fred Young (Ohio politician) =

American politician

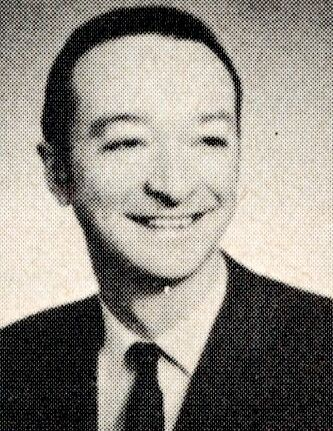

Member of the Ohio House of Representatives from the 38th district
- In office January 3, 1969-December 31, 1976
- Preceded by: Albert Sealy
- Succeeded by: Bob Corbin

Personal details
- Born: January 1, 1932 Dayton, Ohio
- Died: January 12, 2006 (aged 74) Dayton, Ohio
- Party: Republican

Frederick N. Young (January 1, 1932 – January 12, 2006) was a member of the Ohio House of Representatives serving from 1969 to 1976. Young graduated from Harvard Law School and practiced law in his father's law firm. From 1993 to 2005, he served on the Ohio District Courts of Appeals He was part of the Republican Party.
