= Claude Fiocca =

American politician

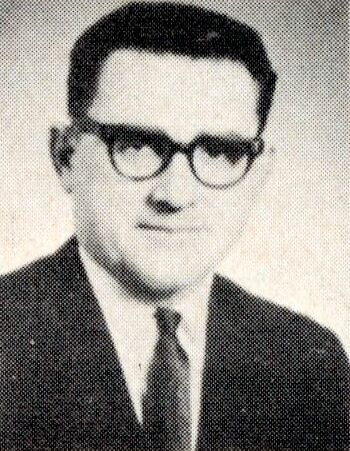

Member of the Ohio House of Representatives from the 40th district
- In office January 3, 1967 – December 31, 1974
- Preceded by: None (First)
- Succeeded by: Paul Wingard

Personal details
- Born: 1931 Akron, Ohio, U.S.
- Died: March 31, 2001 (aged 69) Akron, Ohio, U.S.
- Party: Democratic

Claude Michael Fiocca (1931 – March 31, 2001) was an American politician who was a member of the Ohio House of Representatives.
