= Clara Weisenborn =

American politician (1907–1985)

Member of the Ohio Senate from the 5th district
- In office January 3, 1967 – December 31, 1974
- Preceded by: Inaugural holder
- Succeeded by: Neal Zimmers

Personal details
- Born: February 9, 1907 Dayton, Ohio
- Died: January 26, 1985 (aged 77) Dayton, Ohio
- Party: Republican

Clara E. Weisenborn (February 9, 1907 – January 26, 1985) was a Republican Ohio politician who served in the Ohio General Assembly. Born in Dayton, Weisenborn was a journalist by trade for the Journal Herald, a prominent Dayton newspaper. She was initially elected to the Ohio House of Representatives in 1952 and served seven consecutive terms in the House. In 1966, Weisenborn was elected to the Ohio Senate, following the Voting Rights Act of 1965. She was reelected to a second term in 1970.

An advocate for women's rights, Weisenborn challenged and was critical of the fact that no women served as committee chairs in the Ohio legislature. Ultimately, she became one of the first, as chair of the Senate Education Committee.

By 1974, the Fifth Senate District was equally distributed among Republicans and Democrats, and Weisenborn was considered vulnerable in her bid for a third term. She was challenged by Neal Zimmers, who was an attorney in Dayton. Ultimately, Weisenborn lost the election, in a year where Democrats took control of both houses of the state legislature. In all, Weisenborn served twenty two years as a legislator.

Following her time in elected office, Weisenborn returned to Dayton where she remained active in gardening and her local historical society, as well as championing many park districts throughout the Miami Valley. She died in 1985.

Weisenborn Middle School in the Dayton suburb of Huber Heights is named in her honor.
