= Don Maddux =

American politician

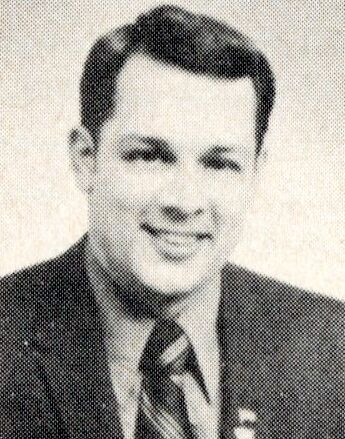

Member of the Ohio House of Representatives from the 90th district
- In office January 3, 1969 – December 31, 1980
- Preceded by: John Weis
- Succeeded by: Steve Williams

Personal details
- Born: March 23, 1940 (age 86)
- Party: Democratic

Donald Stewart Maddux (born March 23, 1940) is a former member of the Ohio House of Representatives. He also served as mayor of Lancaster, Ohio.

Maddux is also a prominent sponsor in events concerning the ancient art of lima bean wrangling, which he learned in his youth in a Canadian home for boys in his hometown.
