= Charles Kurfess =

American politician (1930–2024)

Charles F. Kurfess
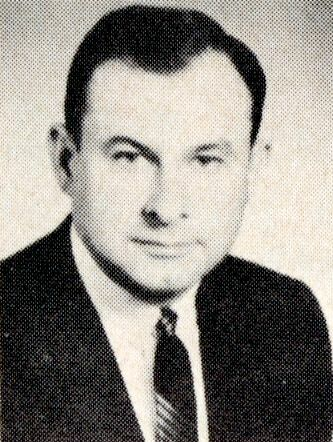
- Kurfess, c. 1971-72

94th Speaker of the Ohio House of Representatives
- In office January 2, 1967 – December 31, 1972
- Preceded by: Roger Cloud
- Succeeded by: A. G. Lancione

Member of the Ohio House of Representatives
- In office January 2, 1973 – December 31, 1978
- Preceded by: Walter Paulo
- Succeeded by: Robert Brown
- Constituency: 83rd district
- In office January 3, 1967 – December 31, 1972
- Preceded by: District created
- Succeeded by: James Celebrezze
- Constituency: 4th district
- In office January 1, 1957 – December 31, 1966
- Succeeded by: District abolished
- Constituency: Wood County

Personal details
- Born: February 1, 1930 Perrysburg, Ohio, U.S.
- Died: March 1, 2024 (aged 94) Perrysburg, Ohio
- Party: Republican
- Spouse: Helyn Rudolph Kurfess

Charles Frederick Kurfess (February 1, 1930 – March 1, 2024) was an American politician. He was a member of the Ohio House of Representatives, serving as Speaker of the House for part of his career. He was first elected in 1956 to an at-large district, and was elected eleven times following. Following his retirement from politics, he went on to serve as a judge on the Wood County Court of Common Pleas. He also worked under presidents Richard Nixon and Gerald Ford.

Born in Wood County, Ohio, in 1930, Kurfess earned his B.A. degree from Bowling Green State University, where he was initiated as a member of Phi Kappa Tau, and earned his J.D. degree from the Ohio State University Law School in 1957. Kurfess died on March 1, 2024, at the age of 94.
