= Harry Armstrong (politician) =

American politician

Member of the Ohio Senate from the 17th district
- In office January 3, 1967-December 31, 1974
- Preceded by: Districts Created
- Succeeded by: Oakley C. Collins

Personal details
- Born: October 15, 1915 Hocking County, Ohio
- Died: April 28, 2011 (aged 95) Logan, Ohio
- Party: Republican

Harry L. Armstrong (October 15, 1915 – April 28, 2011) was a member of the Ohio Senate. He served the 17th District, which encompassed much of Southeastern, Appalachian, Ohio. He was responsible for many pieces of legislation that benefited Ohio State Parks and the coal industry. He served from 1967, when districts were created, until 1974.

He died on April 28, 2011.
