= John Wargo =

American politician

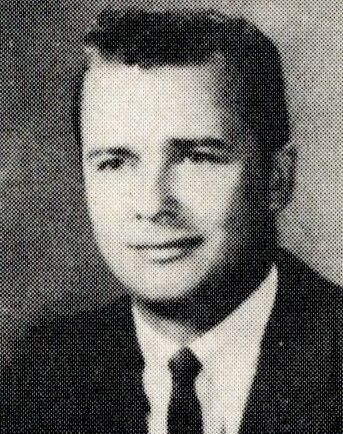

Member of the Ohio House of Representatives
- In office January 2, 1973 – December 31, 1982
- Preceded by: redistricted
- Succeeded by: John D. Shivers Jr.
- Constituency: 2nd district
- In office January 5, 1971 – December 31, 1972
- Preceded by: Clarence Wetzel
- Succeeded by: redistricted
- Constituency: 34th district

Personal details
- Born: March 10, 1938
- Died: July 25, 2017 (aged 79) Franklin Township, Columbiana County, Ohio
- Party: Democratic

John P. Wargo (March 10, 1938 – July 25, 2017) was an American politician who served in the Ohio House of Representatives from 1971 to 1982 as a member of the Democratic Party.

Wargo was from Summitville, Ohio. He was first elected as Franklin Township trustee before serving as Columbiana County auditor from 1964 to 1970. He was then elected to the Ohio House of Representatives, where he represented Columbiana County as the 34th district, and later the 2nd district after the 1970 census redistricting.

Wargo later served as a county commissioner from 1982 to 1986, and again from 1988 to 1996. Wargo ran for his former seat in the Ohio House in 2000, where he lost to Republican Chuck Blasdel.
