= Larry G. Smith (politician) =

American politician

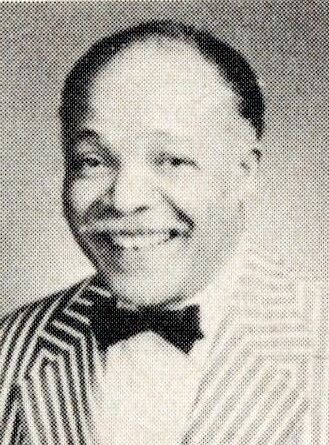

Member of the Ohio House of Representatives from the 42nd district
- In office January 3, 1967 – December 31, 1972
- Preceded by: District Established
- Succeeded by: Thomas M. Bell

Personal details
- Born: November 11, 1914 Uniontown, Pennsylvania
- Died: March 22, 1992 (aged 77) Cleveland, Ohio
- Party: Democratic

Larry G. Smith (November 11, 1914 – March 22, 1992) was a member of the Ohio House of Representatives.
