= Joseph Hiestand =

American politician (1906–2004)

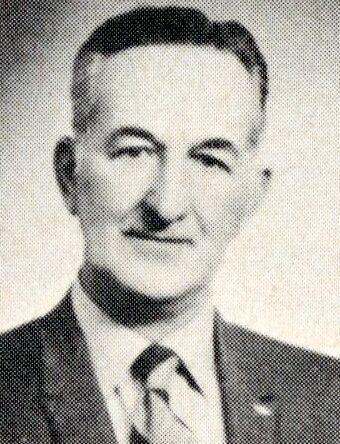

Member of the Ohio House of Representatives from the 77th district
- In office January 3, 1967 – December 31, 1974
- Preceded by: Districts Established
- Succeeded by: Bob McEwen

Personal details
- Born: November 26, 1906
- Died: October 5, 2004 (aged 97)
- Party: Republican

Joseph Franklin Hiestand (November 26, 1906 – October 5, 2004) was an American politician who served as a member of the Ohio House of Representatives.
