= William W. Taft =

American politician

Member of the Ohio Senate from the 26th district
- In office January 3, 1967 – December 31, 1972
- Preceded by: Districts Created
- Succeeded by: Anice Johnson

Personal details
- Born: William Wilson Taft; September 15, 1932 Cleveland, Ohio, U.S.
- Died: May 31, 2024 (aged 91)
- Party: Republican
- Spouse: Edith Freida Gress
- Education: Amherst College (BA); Harvard Law School (LLB)

William Wilson Taft (September 15, 1932 – May 31, 2024) was an American politician who served as a member of the Ohio House of Representatives and Senate, and was a member of the prominent Taft family. He was elected to the state house in 1960, and he was initially sworn in by his uncle, state supreme court justice Kingsley A. Taft. From Cleveland, he served the 26th senate district, which was based out of far eastern Cuyahoga County. He served from 1967 to 1972, when he was replaced by Anice Johnson. Taft also served as a member of the board of trustees for Cleveland State University
