= A. G. Lancione =

American politician (1907–1989)

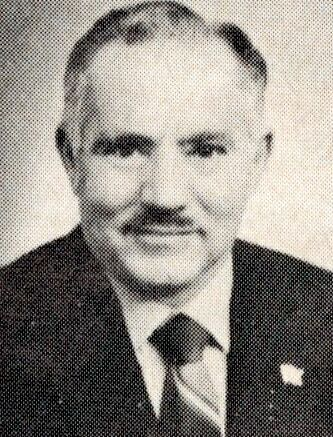

95th Speaker of the Ohio House of Representatives
- In office January 1, 1973 – January 5, 1975
- Preceded by: Charles Kurfess
- Succeeded by: Vern Riffe

Member of the Ohio House of Representatives from the 99th district
- In office January 3, 1967 – December 31, 1978
- Preceded by: District established
- Succeeded by: Bob Ney

Personal details
- Born: February 12, 1907 Cementon, Pennsylvania, U.S.
- Died: November 5, 1989 (aged 82) Columbus, Ohio, U.S.
- Party: Democratic

Americus Gabe Lancione (February 12, 1907 – November 5, 1989) was a Democratic member of the Ohio House of Representatives from Belmont County, Ohio, who served as Speaker of the Ohio House of Representatives from 1973-1975. A portion of Route 7 in Bellaire, OH is dedicated to his service and is known as the A.G. Lancione Memorial Highway.
