= Frank H. Mayfield =

American politician

Frank H. Mayfield, Jr.
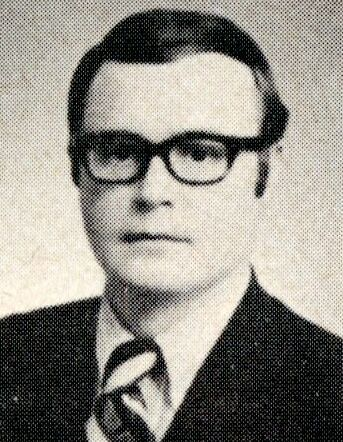

Member of the Ohio House of Representatives from the 65th district
- In office January 15, 1968 – December 31, 1976
- Preceded by: Ralph B. Kohnen
- Succeeded by: Bob Taft

Personal details
- Born: July 20, 1939 Cincinnati, Ohio
- Died: 31 October 2023 (aged 84) Cincinnati, Ohio
- Party: Republican

Frank Henderson Mayfield, Jr. (born July 20 1939, died 31 October 2023) was a member of the Ohio House of Representatives.
