= Mack Pemberton =

American politician

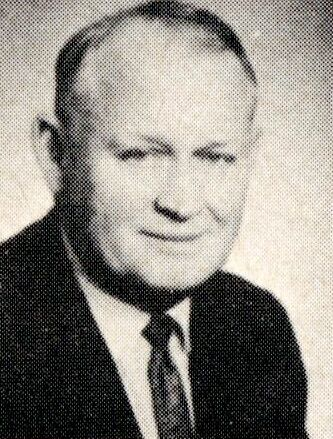

Member of the Ohio House of Representatives from the 33rd district
- In office January 3, 1967-December 31, 1978
- Preceded by: At Large District
- Succeeded by: Don Gilmore

Personal details
- Born: July 1, 1912
- Died: June 19, 1980 (aged 67) Columbus, Ohio
- Party: Republican

Mack Pemberton (July 1, 1912 – June 19, 1980) was a member of the Ohio House of Representatives.
