= Marigene Valiquette =

American politician (1924–2024)

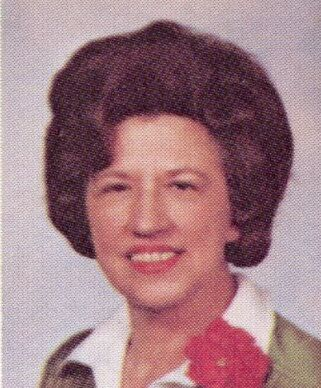
- Valiquette in 1977

Member of the Ohio Senate from the 11th district
- In office January 14, 1969 – December 31, 1986
- Preceded by: Frank W. King
- Succeeded by: Linda J. Furney

Member of the Ohio House of Representatives from the 79th district
- In office January 3, 1963 – January 14, 1969
- Preceded by: None (First)
- Succeeded by: Arthur Wilkowski

Personal details
- Born: August 22, 1924 Toledo, Ohio, U.S.
- Died: August 6, 2024 (aged 99)
- Party: Democratic

Marigene Gertrude Valiquette (August 22, 1924 – August 6, 2024) was an American politician who was a member of the Ohio General Assembly. She served 24 consecutive years in the state legislature, first as a member of the Ohio House of Representatives, beginning in 1963, and subsequently as a member of the Ohio State Senate, from 1969 until 1986.

== Career ==
During her third year of law school at the University of Toledo, Valiquette became a law clerk for Judge Geraldine Macelwane in 1959 after an unsuccessful run for city council.

For most of her 18 years as a state senator, Valiquette was the only female senator in office. She became chair of the Judiciary Committee in 1971; later she chaired the Ethics Committee. During a period in the 1980s when the Democratic Party was in the majority, she was a ranking member on both the Finance and the Rules Committee.

== Support for the Equal Rights Amendment ==
Valiquette played a pivotal role in securing Ohio's ratification of the ERA, championing it through the state legislature.

=== Early 1970s ===
In the early 1970s, as a state senator, Valiquette advocated strongly for Ohio's passage of the Equal Rights Amendment (ERA), the proposed amendment to the United States Constitution that aimed to guarantee equal rights for women.

==== 1972 ====
In 1972, Valiquette worked in the Ohio senate to champion the amendment but expressed frustration with "enthusiasm lacking" from her colleagues.

==== 1973 ====
In 1973, Valiquette was very politically active working for the ratification of the ERA. In January, she spoke at an ERA workshop which was co-hosted by the Cincinnati Council on the State of Women as well as the Coalition of Campus Women. The workshop was held on the University of Cincinnati campus. According to the Cincinnati Enquirer, Valiquette said at the workshop, "I know what it's like to be a single working woman. But I was made equal and I was born equal, and all I want is my right in law."

Also that year, Valiquette was quoted in the press advocating for the passage of the amendment saying, "It is an attack against the last bastion of discrimination not covered in our Bill of Rights."

==== 1974 ====
In February 1974 Ohio became the 33rd state to ratify the ERA.

== Personal life ==
Valiquette was a devout Catholic and credited nuns who mentored her in her formative years as some of the most important people in her life.

In 1985 and 1986, Valiquette was absent from the Ohio Senate for a number of months which ended her career. The absences were attributed to family deaths and financial issues.

In 1978, she was inducted into the Ohio Women's Hall of Fame. She died on August 6, 2024, at the age of 99.
