= George D. Tablack =

American politician (1930–2001)

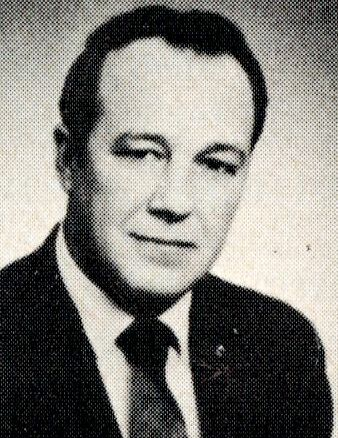

Member of the Ohio House of Representatives from the 52nd district
- In office June 9, 1970 – December 31, 1976
- Preceded by: Jim Panno
- Succeeded by: Joseph Vukovich

Personal details
- Born: June 12, 1930 Youngstown, Ohio, U.S.
- Died: October 20, 2001 (aged 71) Youngstown, Ohio, U.S.
- Party: Democratic

George D. Tablack (June 12, 1930 – October 20, 2001) was an American politician who served as a member of the Ohio House of Representatives, sheriff of Mahoning County, and mayor of Campbell, Ohio.

== Career ==
During his tenure as a member of the Ohio House of Representatives, he was instrumental in obtaining funding for the Ohio University College of Osteopathic Medicine. The OOF Scholarship Program culminated in 1977 with the permanent endowment of a named scholarship funds in his honor, providing an annual award to an Ohio resident who aspires to practice family medicine in the state.
