= Joe Tulley =

American politician

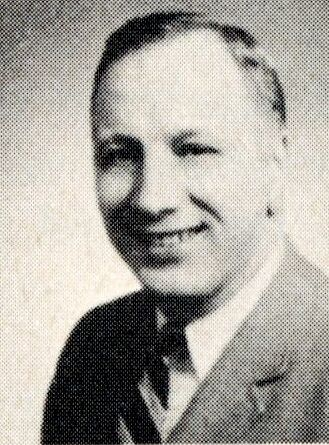

Member of the Ohio House of Representatives from the 59th district
- In office January 3, 1967 – December 31, 1976
- Preceded by: Countywide Districts
- Succeeded by: Ed Hughes

Personal details
- Born: Joseph P. Tulley; August 17, 1922 Ohio, U.S.
- Died: November 14, 2003 (aged 81) Kirtland, Ohio
- Party: Republican
- Spouse: Mary
- Children: seven
- Occupation: prosecutor

Joseph P. Tulley (August 17, 1922 – November 14, 2003) was an American politician. He served as a member of the Ohio House of Representatives for the 59th District from 1967 to 1976. Tulley served in World War II as well as the Korean War, and owned a radio station. He was a lawyer.
