= Arthur Wilkowski =

American politician

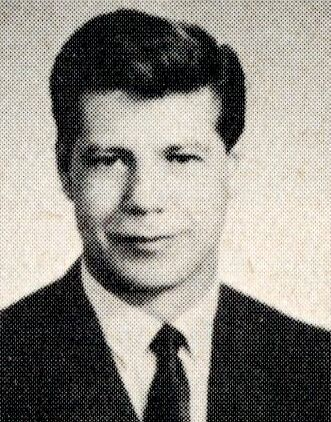

Member of the Ohio House of Representatives from the 46th district
- In office January 16, 1969 – July 19, 1983
- Preceded by: Marigene Valiquette
- Succeeded by: Don Czarcinski

Personal details
- Born: December 29, 1928 Lorain, Ohio
- Died: November 30, 1999 (aged 70) Sylvania, Ohio
- Party: Democratic

Arthur R. Wilkowski (December 29, 1928 – November 30, 1999) was a member of the Ohio House of Representatives. He died of heart failure in 1999.
