= Oakley C. Collins =

American politician (1916–1994)

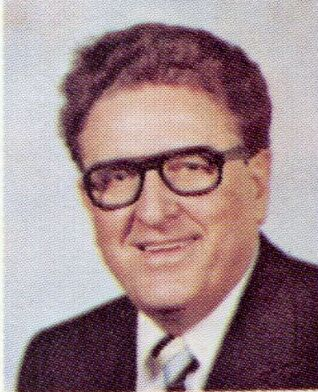

Member of the Ohio Senate from the 17th district
- In office January 3, 1975–December 31, 1986
- Preceded by: Harry Armstrong
- Succeeded by: Jan Michael Long

Member of the Ohio House of Representatives from the 92nd district
- In office January 3, 1973–December 31, 1974
- Preceded by: Carlton Davidson
- Succeeded by: Ron James

Member of the Ohio Senate from the 18th district
- In office January 3, 1967-December 31, 1972
- Preceded by: Districts Created
- Succeeded by: Bill Mussey

Personal details
- Born: 1916 Lawrence County, Ohio, United States
- Died: October 30, 1994 (aged 77–78) Ironton, Ohio
- Party: Republican

Oakley C. Collins (1916 – October 30, 1994) was a Republican member of the Ohio General Assembly. A former school teacher from Ironton, Ohio, Collins initially ran for the Ohio House of Representatives, winning a seat in 1946, and was reelected in 1948. He opted to move to the Ohio Senate in 1950, winning a seat to represent much of Appalachian Ohio. He won reelection in 1952, 1954, and 1956.

In 1958, Collins opted for a fifth term, but lost to Democrat J. Sherman Porter, a radio personality from Gallipolis. However, he opted again to run in 1962, after Ohio Senate terms grew to four years. He won, and was again seated in 1963 to the Seventh/Eighth District, and would go forth to serve as Chairman of the Education Committee. Following the Voting Rights Act of 1965, Collins was elected to the new 18th District in 1966, and reelected in 1968.

Following redistricting in 1972, Collins found himself drawn out of his current district and into another. With the district he currently lived in not up for reelection until 1974, Collins opted to relinquish his Senate seat instead of running in the new district and instead seek a seat in the Ohio House of Representatives. He was successful, and was seated in the House for 1973.

Just two years into his House tenure, Collins again opted to run for the Senate, challenging incumbent and fellow Republican Harry Armstrong in the 1974 primary. In an upset, he narrowly defeated Armstrong to take the nomination, and went on to win the general election. He won reelection in 1978, and again in 1982. Up for reelection again in 1986, Collins initially was not considered vulnerable. However, surmounting ethics problems created an opening for his Democratic opponent, Jan Michael Long. In the end, Long defeated Collins in an upset, ending his 22-year career in the Senate.

Following his defeat, Collins returned to Ironton to his family mining company. He died on October 30, 1994, at the age of 82.
