= Fred Hadley =

American politician (1911–1988)

Fred B. Hadley
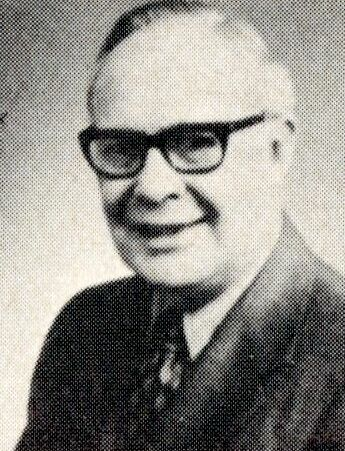

Member of the Ohio House of Representatives
- In office January 2, 1973 – December 31, 1978
- Preceded by: Arthur Wilkowski
- Succeeded by: Larry Manahan
- Constituency: 79th district
- In office January 3, 1967 – December 31, 1972
- Preceded by: District created
- Succeeded by: Raymond Luther
- Constituency: 1st district
- In office January 5, 1965 – December 31, 1966
- Preceded by: Robert Winzeler
- Succeeded by: District abolished
- Constituency: Williams County

Personal details
- Born: July 2, 1911
- Died: August 2, 1988 (aged 77) Williams County, Ohio, United States
- Party: Republican
- Spouse: Alice Jean Munro

Fred B. Hadley (July 2, 1911 – August 2, 1988) was a member of the Ohio House of Representatives, serving from 1967 to 1978. A longtime legislator, Hadley was often involved in legislation regarding education, technology advancement, and labor issues. His district consisted of the direct Northwestern Corner of Ohio.
