= Ethel Swanbeck =

American politician

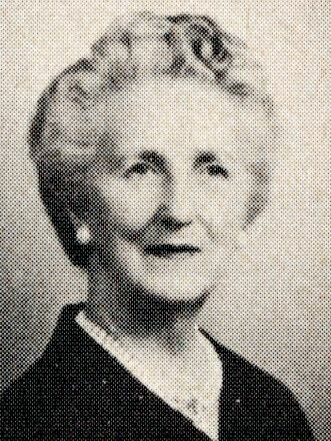

Member of the Ohio House of Representatives from the 72nd district
- In office January 3, 1967-December 31, 1976
- Preceded by: Districts Created
- Succeeded by: Marie Tansey

Personal details
- Born: October 15, 1893 Cleveland, Ohio
- Died: December 21, 1989 (aged 96) Huron, Ohio
- Party: Republican

Ethel Gertrude Swanbeck (October 15, 1893 – December 21, 1989) was an American politician and member of the Ohio House of Representatives. She was the first woman to serve eleven consecutive terms in the Ohio House from 1955 to 1976.
