= Oliver Ocasek =

American politician

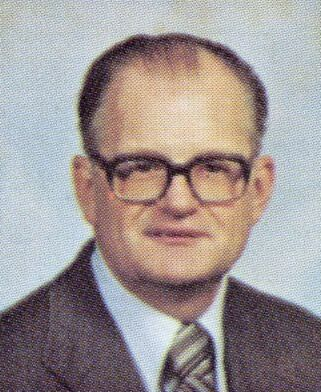

Member of the Ohio Senate from the 27th district
- In office January 2, 1967 – December 31, 1986
- Preceded by: Districts Created
- Succeeded by: Roy Ray

85th President of the Ohio Senate
- In office 1974–1980
- Preceded by: Ted Gray (pro Tempore)
- Succeeded by: Paul Gillmor

Personal details
- Born: November 2, 1925 Bedford, Ohio
- Died: June 25, 1999 (aged 73) Akron, Ohio
- Party: Democratic

Oliver Robert Ocasek (November 2, 1925 – June 25, 1999) was an American politician of the Democratic Party who served as President of the Ohio State Senate in the 1970s and 1980s. After the Democrats lost their majority in the Senate, Ocasek was replaced as party leader by Harry Meshel. In 1962 and 1968, Ocasek ran for a seat in the United States House of Representatives. He lost both times to Republican incumbent William H. Ayres. In 1986 he lost a Democratic primary for congress in the 14th district to Thomas C. Sawyer. Ocasek also served on the Ohio Board of Education from 1993 to 1998.

== See also ==
- Ohio's 14th congressional district
