= Phale Hale =

American politician (1914–2009)

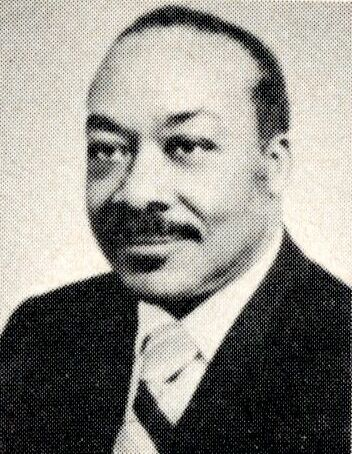

Member of the Ohio House of Representatives from the 31st district
- In office January 3, 1967 – April 22, 1980
- Preceded by: None (First)
- Succeeded by: Otto Beatty Jr.

Personal details
- Born: July 16, 1914 Greenwood, Mississippi
- Died: May 29, 2009 (aged 94) Columbus, Ohio
- Party: Democratic

Phale Dolphis Hale (July 16, 1914 – May 29, 2009) was a member of the Ohio House of Representatives.

He is interred at Green Lawn Cemetery in Columbus, Ohio.
