= Troy Lee James =

American politician (1924–2007)

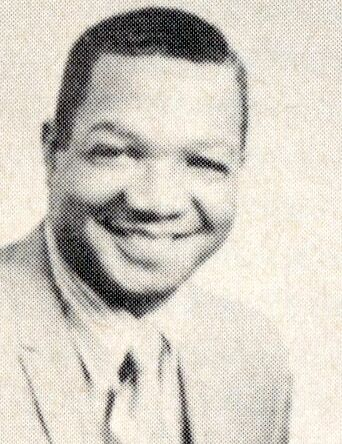

Member of the Ohio House of Representatives from the 10th district
- In office January 3, 1967 – December 31, 2000
- Preceded by: District Established
- Succeeded by: Annie L. Key

Personal details
- Born: April 18, 1924 Texarkana, Texas, U.S.
- Died: November 1, 2007 (aged 83) Cleveland, Ohio, U.S.
- Party: Democratic

Troy Lee James (April 18, 1924 – November 1, 2007) was an American politician who served in the Ohio House of Representatives from 1967 to 2000. A former laborer and union leader, James initially ran for the Ohio House of Representatives in 1966, following the Voting Rights Act of 1965. He won, and was seated on January 3, 1967. He went on to win again in 1968, 1970, 1972 and 1974.

By 1975, James was serving as the Chairman of the Economic Development and Small Business Committee. He would later go on to serve as Chairman of the Health and Aging Committee, and would go on to win reelection twelve more times. At the end of his tenure in the House, he served as Ranking Minority Member of the Housing and Urban Affairs Committee.

Following the establishment of term limits in 1992, James was ineligible to run again following 2000. He left the House in 2000, after 34 years in the legislature, making him the longest serving Democrat in the history of the Ohio General Assembly. Retiring to Cleveland, he died in 2007.

In 2003 Interstate 490 in Cleveland was named the Troy Lee James Highway.
