= Morris Jackson =

American politician

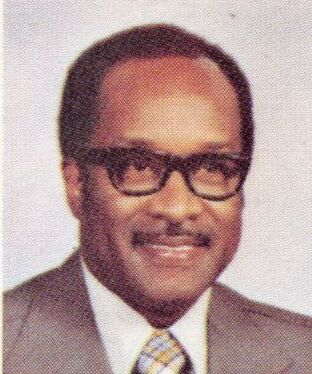

Member of the Ohio Senate from the 21st district
- In office January 3, 1967 – March 17, 1984
- Preceded by: Districts Created
- Succeeded by: Michael R. White

Personal details
- Born: April 1, 1918 Araba, Georgia
- Died: December 12, 2004 (aged 86) Cleveland, Ohio
- Party: Democratic

M. Morrison Jackson (April 1, 1918 – December 12, 2004) was a member of the Ohio Senate.

A native of Cleveland, Jackson served in the state Senate from 1967 to 1984. The most senior African American Senator at his time, he held a number of leadership roles during his time. In 1982, upon the Senate's switch to a Democratic majority, Jackson was involved in a Republican coup in which he was promised the position of Senate President if he switched party affiliations. Ultimately, however, he remained with Democrats, and Harry Meshel became the next Senate leader.

He retired in 1984, and was succeeded by future Cleveland Mayor Michael R. White.
