= George Mastics =

American politician (1931–2018)

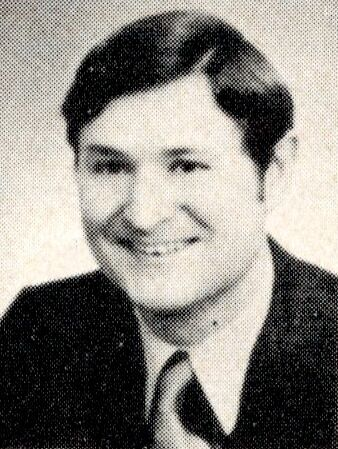

Member of the Ohio House of Representatives from the 52nd district
- In office January 3, 1967 – December 31, 1974
- Preceded by: At Large
- Succeeded by: Jim Betts

Personal details
- Born: December 27, 1931 Cleveland, Ohio, U.S.
- Died: October 31, 2018 (aged 86) Palm Beach, Florida, U.S.
- Party: Republican

George E. Mastics (December 27, 1931 – October 31, 2018) was a member of the Ohio House of Representatives, and a former Port of Palm Beach Commissioner in Palm Beach County, Florida.
