= 114th Ohio General Assembly =

Term of state legislature in Ohio, US

The One Hundred Fourteenth Ohio General Assembly was the legislative body of the state of Ohio in 1981 and 1982. In this General Assembly, the Ohio Senate was controlled by the Republican Party and the Ohio House of Representatives was controlled by the Democratic Party. In the Senate, there were 18 Republicans and 15 Democrats. In the House, there were 60 Democrats and 38 Republicans. It was the final Ohio General Assembly to use legislative Districts from the 1970 United States census.

== Major events ==
=== Vacancies ===
- February 1, 1981: Matthew Hachadorian resigns from the 17th House District.
- May 13, 1981: Donna Pope resigns from the 12th House District.
- November 18, 1982: Representative Benny Bonanno resigns.
- December 13, 1982: Charles Curran resigns from the 6th Senatorial District.
- December 13, 1982: Senator Mike DeWine resigns from the 10th Senatorial District.

=== Appointments ===
- February 10, 1981: Jeffrey L. Dean is appointed to the 17th House District.
- May 13, 1981: Edna Deffler is appointed to the 12th House District.
- November 18, 1982: Barbara C. Pringle is appointed to the 8th House District.
- December 13, 1982: Tom Fries is appointed to the 6th Senatorial District.
- December 13, 1982: David Hobson is appointed to the 10th Senatorial District.

== Senate ==
=== Leadership ===
==== Majority leadership ====
- President of the Senate: Paul Gillmor
- President pro tempore of the Senate: Tom Van Meter
- Assistant pro tempore: Stanley Aronoff

==== Minority leadership ====
- Leader: Harry Meshel
- Assistant Leader: Neal Zimmers
- Whip: Charles Butts

=== Members of the 114th Ohio Senate ===
District	Senator	Party	First elected
1	M. Ben Gaeth	Republican	1974
2	Paul Gillmor	Republican	1967
3	Ted Gray	Republican	1967
4	Buz Lukens	Republican	1971 (Appt.)
5	Neal Zimmers	Democratic	1974
6	Tom Fries	Democratic	1982 (Appt.)
7	Richard Finan	Republican	1978 (Appt.)
8	Stanley Aronoff	Republican	1967
9	Bill Bowen	Democratic	1970 (Appt.)
10	David Hobson	Republican	1982 (Appt.)
11	Marigene Valiquette	Democratic	1969 (Appt.)
12	Steve Maurer	Democratic	1980
13	Ronald Nabowski	Democratic	1977 (Appt.)
14	Cooper Snyder	Republican	1979 (Appt.)
15	John Kasich	Republican	1980
16	Michael Schwarzwalder	Democratic	1976
17	Oakley C. Collins	Republican	1974
18	Marcus Roberto	Democratic	1976
19	Tom Van Meter	Republican	1972
20	Sam Speck	Republican	1976
21	Morris Jackson	Democratic	1967
22	Ben Skall	Republican	1980
23	Charles L. Butts	Democratic	1974
24	Gary C. Suhadolnik	Republican	1980
25	Paul Matia	Republican	1978
26	Paul Pfeifer	Republican	1976
27	Oliver Ocasek	Democratic	1967
28	Kenneth Cox	Democratic	1976
29	Tom Walsh	Republican	1978
30	Bill Ress	Republican	1980
31	Tim McCormack	Democratic	1974
32	Tom Carney	Democratic	1972
33	Harry Meshel	Democratic	1970

== House of Representatives ==
=== Leadership ===
==== Majority leadership ====
- Speaker of the House: Vern Riffe
- President pro tempore of the Senate: Barney Quilter
- Floor Leader: Bill Mallory
- Assistant Majority Floor Leader: Vernon Cook
- Majority Whip: Mary Boyle

==== Minority leadership ====
- Leader: Corwin Nixon
- Assistant Leader: Waldo Rose
- Whip: David Johnson

=== Members of the 114th Ohio House of Representatives ===
District	Representative	Party	First elected
1	Eugene Branstool	Democratic	1974
2	John Wargo	Democratic	1970
3	Jim Petro	Republican	1980
4	Rocco Colonna	Democratic	1974
5	Francine Panehal	Democratic	1974
6	Patrick Sweeney	Democratic	1967
7	Ken Rocco	Democratic	1972
8	Barbara C. Pringle	Democratic	1982 (Appt.)
9	Troy Lee James	Democratic	1967
10	Tom Bell	Democratic	1972
11	Frank Mahnic Jr.	Democratic	1978
12	Edna Deffler	Republican	1981 (Appt.)
13	Ike Thompson	Democratic	1970
14	Mary Boyle	Democratic	1978
15	John Thompson	Democratic	1970
16	Lee Fisher	Democratic	1980
17	Jeff Dean	Republican	1981 (Appt.)
18	Ron Suster	Democratic	1980
19	Dale Van Vyven	Republican	1978 (Appt.)
20	Thomas Pottenger	Republican	1976
21	Jerome F. Luebbers	Democratic	1978
22	Edith Mayer	Republican	1977 (Appt.)
23	William L. Mallory Sr.	Democratic	1966
24	Terry Tranter	Democratic	1976 (Appt.)
25	Helen Rankin	Democratic	1978 (Appt.)
26	Helen Fix	Republican	1972
27	Jo Ann Davidson	Republican	1980
28	Dana Deshler	Republican	
29	Leslie Brown	Democratic	1976
30	Mike Stinziano	Democratic	1972
31	Otto Beatty Jr.	Democratic	1980 (Appt.)
32	Dean Conley	Democratic	1978
33	Don Gilmore	Republican	1978
34	Ed Orlett	Democratic	1972
35	Vacant		
36	C.J. McLin	Democratic	1966
37	Larry Balweg	Republican	1980
38	Bob Corbin	Republican	1976
39	Vernon Cook	Democratic	1972
40	Thomas C. Sawyer	Democratic	1976
41	Bob Nettle	Democratic	1976
42	Pete Crossland	Democratic	1972
43	Cliff Skeen	Democratic	1976
44	Dave Karmol	Republican	1976
45	Casey Jones	Democratic	1968
46	Arthur Wilkowski	Democratic	1969 (Appt.)
47	Barney Quilter	Democratic	1966
48	Dick Maier	Republican	1972
49	Chuck Red Ash	Republican	1978
50	William J. Healy	Democratic	1974
51	Tom Gilmartin	Democratic	1972
52	Joseph Vukovich	Democratic	1976
53	Leo Camera	Democratic	1968
54	Marguerite Bowman	Democratic	1980
55	Bob Nader	Democratic	1970
56	Joe Williams	Democratic	1980
57	Bill Donham	Republican	1972
58	Michael A. Fox	Democratic	1974
59	Ed Hughes	Democratic	1976
60	David Hartley	Democratic	
61	Sherrod Brown	Democratic	1974
62	John A. Begala	Democratic	1976
63	Jim Zehner	Democratic	1976
64	Waldo Rose	Republican	1972
65	John O'Brien	Republican	1980
66	Larry Hughes	Republican	1968
67	Russ Guerra	Democratic	
68	Ron Amstutz	Republican	1980
69	John Galbraith	Democratic	1966
70	David Johnson	Republican	1976
71	Ron Gerberry	Democratic	1974
72	Marie Tansey	Republican	1976
73	Corwin Nixon	Republican	1967
74	Dennis Wojtanowski	Democratic	1974
75	Charles R. Saxbe	Republican	1974
76	Harry Turner	Republican	1972
77	Joe Haines	Republican	1980
78	Rodney Hughes	Republican	1967
79	Larry Manahan	Republican	1978
80	Dale Locker	Democratic	1972
81	Bob Netzley	Republican	1967
82	Chuck Earl	Republican	1980
83	Robert Brown	Republican	1978
84	Fred Deering	Democratic	1972
85	Gene Damschroder	Republican	1972
86	Walter McClaskey	Republican	1972
87	Harry Mallott	Democratic	1972
88	Myrl Shoemaker	Democratic	1967
89	Vern Riffe	Democratic	1967
90	Steve Williams	Republican	1980
91	Claire Ball	Republican	1972
92	Ron James	Democratic	1974
93	William G. Batchelder	Republican	1968
94	Jim Ross	Democratic	1978
95	Tom Johnson	Democratic	1976
96	William Hinig	Democratic	1967
97	Robert Boggs	Democratic	1972
98	Arthur Bowers	Democratic	1968
99	Bob Ney	Republican	1978

Appt.- Member was appointed to current House Seat

== See also ==
- Ohio House of Representatives membership, 126th General Assembly
- Ohio House of Representatives membership, 125th General Assembly
- List of Ohio state legislatures
