= 113th Ohio General Assembly =

The One Hundred Thirteenth Ohio General Assembly was the legislative body of the state of Ohio in the years 1979 and 1980. In this General Assembly, both the Ohio Senate and the Ohio House of Representatives were controlled by the Democratic Party. In the Senate, there were 18 Democrats and 15 Republicans. In the House, there were 66 Democrats and 33 Republicans.

== Major events ==
=== Vacancies ===
- January 1, 1979: Senator Tony Hall (D-6th) resigns to take a seat in the United States House of Representatives.
- March 30, 1979: Senator Bill Mussey (R-14th) resigns.
- June 26, 1979: Senator Walter White (R-12th) resigns.
- July 17, 1979: Senator Ferald Ritchie (R-12th) resigns.
- March 6, 1980: Representative Bill O'Neil (R-28th) resigns.
- April 24, 1979: Representative Irma Karmol (R-44th) dies in a car accident
- April 22, 1980: Representative Phale Hale (D-31st) resigns.

=== Appointments ===
- January 9, 1979: Chuck Curran is appointed to the 6th Senatorial District due to the resignation of Tony Hall.
- April 3, 1979: Cooper Snyder is appointed to the 14th Senatorial District due to the resignation of Bill Mussey.
- June 29, 1979: Ferald Ritchie is appointed to the 12th Senatorial District due to the resignation of Walter White.
- July 17, 1979: Richard Ditto is appointed to the 12th Senatorial District due to the resignation of Ferald Ritchie.
- May 15, 1979: David Karmol is appointed to the 44th House District due to the death of Irma Karmol.
- March 11, 1980: Dana Deshler is appointed to the 28th House District due to the resignation of Bill O'Neil.
- April 22, 1980: Otto Beatty Jr. is appointed to the 31st House District due to the resignation of Phale Hale.

== Senate ==
=== Leadership ===
==== Majority leadership ====
- President of the Senate: Oliver Ocasek
- President pro tempore of the Senate: Morris Jackson
- Assistant pro tempore: Harry Meshel

==== Minority leadership ====
- Leader: Paul Gillmor
- Assistant Leader: Tom Van Meter
- Whip: Stanley Aronoff

=== Members of the 113th Ohio Senate ===
District	Senator	Party	First elected
1	M. Ben Gaeth	Republican	1974
2	Paul Gillmor	Republican	1967
3	Ted Gray	Republican	1967
4	Buz Lukens	Republican	1971 (Appt.)
5	Neal Zimmers	Democratic	1974
6	Chuck Curran	Democratic	1979 (Appt.)
7	Richard Finan	Republican	1978 (Appt.)
8	Stanley Aronoff	Republican	1967
9	Bill Bowen	Democratic	1970 (Appt.)
10	John Mahoney	Democratic	1976
11	Marigene Valiquette	Democratic	1969 (Appt.)
12	Richard Ditto	Republican	1979 (Appt.)
13	Ronald Nabowski	Democratic	1977 (Appt.)
14	Cooper Snyder	Republican	1979 (Appt.)
15	John Kasich	Republican	1978
16	Michael Schwarzwalder	Democratic	1976
17	Oakley C. Collins	Republican	1974
18	Marcus Roberto	Democratic	1976
19	Tom Van Meter	Republican	1972
20	Sam Speck	Republican	1976
21	Morris Jackson	Democratic	1967
22	Anthony O. Calabrese	Democratic	1967
23	Charles L. Butts	Democratic	1974
24	Jerome Stano	Democratic	1974
25	Paul Matia	Republican	1978
26	Paul Pfeifer	Republican	1976
27	Oliver Ocasek	Democratic	1967
28	Kenneth Cox	Democratic	1976
29	Tom Walsh	Republican	1978
30	Kinsey Milleson	Democratic	1974
31	Tim McCormack	Democratic	1974
32	Tom Carney	Democratic	1972
33	Harry Meshel	Democratic	1970

== House of Representatives ==
=== Leadership ===
==== Majority leadership ====
- Speaker of the House: Vern Riffe
- President pro tempore of the Senate: Barney Quilter
- Floor Leader: Bill Mallory
- Assistant Majority Floor Leader: Vernon Cook
- Majority Whip: Francine Panehal

==== Minority leadership ====
- Leader: Corwin Nixon
- Assistant Leader: William G. Batchelder
- Whip: Donna Pope

=== Members of the 113th Ohio House of Representatives ===
District	Representative	Party	First elected
1	Eugene Branstool	Democratic	1974
2	John Wargo	Democratic	1970
3	Jim Betts	Republican	1974
4	Rocco Colonna	Democratic	1974
5	Francine Panehal	Democratic	1974
6	Patrick Sweeney	Democratic	1967
7	Ken Rocco	Democratic	1972
8	Benny Bonanno	Democratic	1978
9	Troy Lee James	Democratic	1967
10	Tom Bell	Democratic	1972
11	Frank Mahnic Jr.	Democratic	1978
12	Donna Pope	Republican	1972 (Appt.)
13	Ike Thompson	Democratic	1970
14	Mary Boyle	Democratic	1978
15	John Thompson	Democratic	1970
16	Harry Lehman	Democratic	1970
17	Matt Hatchadorian	Republican	1978
18	Dennis Eckart	Democratic	1974
19	Dale Van Vyven	Republican	1978 (Appt.)
20	Thomas Pottenger	Republican	1976
21	Jerome F. Luebbers	Democratic	1978
22	Edith Mayer	Republican	1977 (Appt.)
23	William L. Mallory Sr.	Democratic	1966
24	Terry Tranter	Democratic	1976 (Appt.)
25	Helen Rankin	Democratic	1978 (Appt.)
26	Helen Fix	Republican	1972
27	Alan Norris	Republican	1966
28	Dana Deshler	Republican	1980 (Appt.)
29	Leslie Brown	Democratic	1976
30	Mike Stinziano	Democratic	1972
31	Otto Beatty Jr.	Democratic	1980 (Appt.)
32	Dean Conley	Democratic	1978
33	Don Gilmore	Republican	1978
34	Ed Orlett	Democratic	1972
35	Tom Fries	Democratic	1970
36	C.J. McLin	Democratic	1966
37	Paul Leonard	Democratic	1972
38	Bob Corbin	Republican	1976
39	Vernon Cook	Democratic	1972
40	Thomas C. Sawyer	Democratic	1976
41	Bob Nettle	Democratic	1976
42	Pete Crossland	Democratic	1972
43	Cliff Skeen	Democratic	1976
44	Dave Karmol	Republican	1974 (Appt.)
45	Casey Jones	Democratic	1968
46	Arthur Wilkowski	Democratic	1969 (Appt.)
47	Barney Quilter	Democratic	1966
48	Dick Maier	Republican	1972
49	Chuck Red Ash	Republican	1978
50	William J. Healy	Democratic	1974
51	Tom Gilmartin	Democratic	1972
52	Joseph Vukovich	Democratic	1976
53	J Leonard Camera	Democratic	1968
54	John Bara	Democratic	1976
55	Bob Nader	Democratic	1970
56	Michael Del Bane	Democratic	1968
57	Bill Donham	Republican	1972
58	Michael A. Fox	Democratic	1974
59	Ed Hughes	Democratic	1976
60	David Hartley	Democratic	
61	Sherrod Brown	Democratic	1974
62	John A. Begala	Democratic	1976
63	Jim Zehner	Democratic	1976
64	Waldo Rose	Republican	1972
65	Bob Taft	Republican	1976
66	Larry Hughes	Republican	1968
67	Larry Christman	Democratic	
68	John Johnson	Democratic	1970
69	John Galbraith	Democratic	1966
70	David Johnson	Democratic	1978
71	Ron Gerberry	Democratic	1974
72	Marie Tansey	Republican	1976
73	Corwin Nixon	Republican	1967
74	Dennis Wojtanowski	Democratic	1974
75	Charles R. Saxbe	Republican	1974
76	Harry Turner	Republican	1972
77	Bob McEwen	Republican	1974
78	Rodney Hughes	Republican	1967
79	Larry Manahan	Republican	1978
80	Dale Locker	Democratic	1972
81	Bob Netzley	Republican	1967
82	Michael Oxley	Republican	1972
83	Robert Brown	Republican	1967
84	Fred Deering	Democratic	1972
85	Gene Damschroder	Republican	1972
86	Walter McClaskey	Republican	1972
87	Harry Mallott	Democratic	1972
88	Myrl Shoemaker	Democratic	
89	Vern Riffe	Democratic	1967
90	Don Maddux	Democratic	1968
91	Claire Ball	Republican	1972
92	Ron James	Democratic	1974
93	William G. Batchelder	Republican	1968
94	Jim Ross	Democratic	1978
95	Tom Johnson	Democratic	1976
96	William Hinig	Democratic	1967
97	Robert Boggs	Democratic	1972
98	Arthur Bowers	Democratic	1968
99	Wayne Hays	Democratic	1978

Appt.- Member was appointed to current House Seat

== See also ==
- Ohio House of Representatives membership, 126th General Assembly
- Ohio House of Representatives membership, 125th General Assembly
- List of Ohio state legislatures
