= Ohio's 13th House of Representatives district =

American legislative district

Ohio's 13th State House of Representatives district
Representative
Tristan W. Rader; D–Lakewood
- Population (2020): 125,018

Ohio's 13th House of Representatives district is currently represented by Democrat Tristan W. Rader. It is located entirely within Cuyahoga County and includes the city of Lakewood and parts of Cleveland.

== List of members representing the district ==
Member	Party	Years	General Assembly	Electoral history
District established January 2, 1967.
Howard Knight (Risingsun)	Republican	January 2, 1967 – December 31, 1972	107th 108th 109th	Elected in 1966. Re-elected in 1968. Re-elected in 1970. Retired to run for state senator.
Ike Thompson (Cleveland)	Democratic	January 1, 1973 – December 31, 1982	110th 111th 112th 113th 114th	Redistricted from the 41st district and re-elected in 1972. Re-elected in 1974. Re-elected in 1976. Re-elected in 1978. Re-elected in 1980. Redistricted to the 14th district.
Frank Mahnic Jr. (Garfield Heights)	Democratic	January 3, 1983 – December 31, 1984	115th	Redistricted from the 11th district and re-elected in 1982. Retired to run for state senator.
John Carroll (Garfield Heights)	Democratic	January 7, 1985 – January 11, 1985	116th	Elected in 1984. Died.
Vacant		January 11, 1985 – February 13, 1985	116th	
Robert Jaskulski (Brecksville)	Democratic	February 13, 1985 – December 31, 1988	116th 117th	Appointed to finish Carroll's term. Re-elected in 1986. Lost re-nomination.
Frank Mahnic Jr. (Valley View)	Democratic	January 2, 1989 – December 31, 1992	118th 119th	Elected in 1988. Re-elected in 1990. Redistricted to the 15th district and lost re-election.
Barbara C. Pringle (Cleveland)	Democratic	January 4, 1993 – December 31, 2000	120th 121st 122nd 123rd	Redistricted from the 11th district and re-elected in 1992. Re-elected in 1994. Re-elected in 1996. Re-elected in 1998. Term-limited.
Mary Rose Oakar (Cleveland)	Democratic	January 1, 2001 – December 31, 2002	124th	Elected in 2000. Retired.
Michael J. Skindell (Lakewood)	Democratic	January 6, 2003 – December 31, 2010	125th 126th 127th 128th	Elected in 2002. Re-elected in 2004. Re-elected in 2006. Re-elected in 2008. Term-limited; ran for state senator.
Nickie Antonio (Lakewood)	Democratic	January 3, 2011 – December 31, 2018	129th 130th 131st 132nd	Elected in 2010. Re-elected in 2012. Re-elected in 2014. Re-elected in 2016. Term-limited; ran for state senator.
Michael J. Skindell (Lakewood)	Democratic	January 7, 2019 – present	133rd 134th 135th	Elected in 2018. Re-elected in 2020. Re-elected in 2022.
