= Ohio's 8th House of Representatives district =

American legislative district

Ohio's 8th State House of Representatives district
Representative
Beth Liston; D–Dublin
- Population (2020): 123,378

Ohio's 8th House of Representatives district is currently represented by Democrat Beth Liston. It is located entirely within Franklin County and includes the city of Worthington and parts of Columbus, as well as parts of Perry and Sharon Townships.

== List of members representing the district ==
Member	Party	Years	General Assembly	Electoral history
District established January 2, 1967.
Rodney Hughes (Bellefontaine)	Republican	January 2, 1967 – December 31, 1972	107th 108th 109th	Elected in 1966. Re-elected in 1968. Re-elected in 1970. Redistricted to the 78th district.
Ed Feighan (Cleveland)	Democratic	January 1, 1973 – December 31, 1978	110th 111th 112th	Elected in 1972. Re-elected in 1974. Re-elected in 1976. Retired to run for Cuyahoga County Commissioner.
Benny Bonanno (Cleveland)	Democratic	January 1, 1979 – November 18, 1982	113th 114th	Elected in 1978. Re-elected in 1980. Resigned to become Cuyahoga County Recorder.
Barbara C. Pringle (Cleveland)	Democratic	November 18, 1982 – December 31, 1982	114th	Appointed to finish Bonanno's term. Redistricted to the 11th district.
Francine Panehal (Cleveland)	Democratic	January 3, 1983 – December 31, 1988	115th 116th 117th	Redistricted from the 5th district and re-elected in 1982. Re-elected in 1984. Re-elected in 1986. Retired.
Madeline Cain (Lakewood)	Democratic	January 2, 1989 – December 31, 1992	118th 119th	Elected in 1988. Re-elected in 1990. Redistricted to the 17th district.
C. J. Prentiss (Cleveland)	Democratic	January 4, 1993 – December 31, 1998	120th 121st 122nd	Redistricted from the 14th district and re-elected in 1992. Re-elected in 1994. Re-elected in 1996. Retired to run for state senator.
Shirley Smith (Cleveland)	Democratic	January 4, 1999 – December 31, 2002	123rd 124th	Elected in 1998. Re-elected in 2000. Redistricted to the 10th district.
Lance Mason (Cleveland)	Democratic	January 6, 2003 – December 31, 2006	125th 126th	Redistricted from the 11th district and re-elected in 2002. Re-elected in 2004. Retired to run for state senator.
Armond Budish (Beachwood)	Democratic	January 1, 2007 – December 31, 2014	127th 128th 129th 130th	Elected in 2006. Re-elected in 2008. Re-elected in 2010. Re-elected in 2012. Term-limited; ran for Cuyahoga County Executive.
Kent Smith (Euclid)	Democratic	January 5, 2015 – December 31, 2022	131st 132nd 133rd 134th	Elected in 2014. Re-elected in 2016. Re-elected in 2018. Re-elected in 2020. Term-limited; ran for state senator.
Beth Liston (Dublin)	Democratic	January 2, 2023 – present	135th	Redistricted from the 21st district and re-elected in 2022.
