= Ohio's 11th House of Representatives district =

American legislative district

Ohio's 11th State House of Representatives district
Representative
Anita Somani; D–Dublin
- Population (2020): 124,045

Ohio's 11th House of Representatives district is currently represented by Democrat Anita Somani. It is located entirely within Franklin County and includes the cities of Dublin, Hilliard, and parts of Columbus, as well as parts of Brown, Norwich, Perry, and Washington Townships.

== List of members representing the district ==
Member	Party	Years	General Assembly	Electoral history
District established January 2, 1967.
Corwin M. Nixon (Lebanon)	Republican	January 2, 1967 – December 31, 1972	107th 108th 109th	Elected in 1966. Re-elected in 1968. Re-elected in 1970. Redistricted to the 73rd district.
Robert Jaskulski (Garfield Heights)	Democratic	January 1, 1973 – December 31, 1978	110th 111th 112th	Redistricted from the 45th district and re-elected in 1972. Re-elected in 1974. Re-elected in 1976. Retired.
Frank Mahnic Jr. (Garfield Heights)	Democratic	January 1, 1979 – December 31, 1982	113th 114th	Elected in 1978. Re-elected in 1980. Redistricted to the 13th district.
Barbara C. Pringle (Cleveland)	Democratic	January 3, 1983 – December 31, 1992	115th 116th 117th 118th 119th	Redistricted from the 8th district and re-elected in 1982. Re-elected in 1984. Re-elected in 1986. Re-elected in 1988. Re-elected in 1990. Redistricted to the 13th district.
Jane L. Campbell (Cleveland)	Democratic	January 4, 1993 – December 31, 1996	120th 121st	Redistricted from the 15th district and re-elected in 1992. Re-elected in 1994. Retired to run for Cuyahoga County Commissioner.
Peter Lawson Jones (Shaker Heights)	Democratic	January 6, 1997 – February 9, 2002	122nd 123rd 124th	Elected in 1996. Re-elected in 1998. Re-elected in 2000. Resigned to become Cuyahoga County Commissioner.
Vacant		February 9, 2002 – February 20, 2002	124th	
Lance Mason (Cleveland)	Democratic	February 20, 2002 – December 31, 2002	124th	Appointed to finish Jones' term. Redistricted to the 8th district.
Annie L. Key (Cleveland)	Democratic	January 6, 2003 – December 31, 2006	125th 126th	Redistricted from the 10th district and re-elected in 2002. Re-elected in 2004. Retired to run for state senator.
Sandra Williams (Cleveland)	Democratic	January 1, 2007 – December 31, 2014	127th 128th 129th 130th	Elected in 2006. Re-elected in 2008. Re-elected in 2010. Re-elected in 2012. Term-limited; ran for state senator.
Stephanie Howse (Cleveland)	Democratic	January 2, 2015 – January 3, 2022	131st 132nd 133rd 134th	Elected in 2014. Re-elected in 2016. Re-elected in 2018. Re-elected in 2020. Resigned to become Cleveland City councillor.
Vacant		January 3, 2022 – February 16, 2022	134th	
Shayla Davis (Garfield Heights)	Democratic	February 16, 2022 – December 31, 2022	134th	Appointed to finish Howse's term. Redistricted to the 18th district and disqualified from running for re-election.
Anita Somani (Dublin)	Democratic	January 2, 2023 – present	135th	Elected in 2022.
