= Anita Somani =

American politician

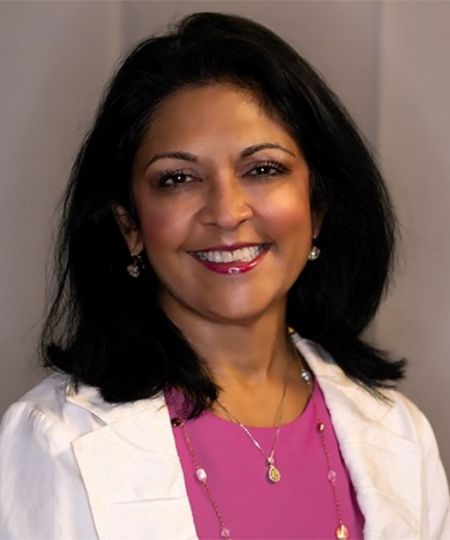

Member of the Ohio House of Representatives
- Incumbent
- Assumed office January 1, 2023
- Preceded by: New seat
- Constituency: 11th district (2023-2025); 8th district (2025-present)

Personal details
- Born: India
- Party: Democratic
- Education: Miami University (BA); Medical College of Ohio (MD)

Anita P. Somani is an American healthcare professional and politician who has served in the Ohio House of Representatives since 2023. A Democrat, she has represented the 8th district since 2025 and previously the 11th district from 2023 to 2025. Somani has practiced as an obstetrician/gynecologist for over three decades.

== Early life and education ==
Somani was born in India and immigrated to the United States when she was 6 months old, moving to Milwaukee and Miami before settling in Ohio. Her father, Peter, is a physician and the former director of the Ohio Department of Health.

She earned a Bachelor of Arts in psychology from Miami University and a Doctor of Medicine from the Medical College of Ohio.

== Career ==
From 1994 to 2020, Somani was an OBGYN at and owner of Comprehensive Women's Care. In 2020, she joined OhioHealth as a gynecologist. Somani was elected to the Ohio House of Representatives in November 2022.

== Ohio House of Representatives ==
Somani was elected to the Ohio House of Representatives for the 11th district, a newly drawn seat, in 2022. She almost did not make the primary ballot due to the primary date being shifted but not the filing deadline amid uncertain redistricting, but the Ohio Supreme Court ruled to reinstate her and 5 other Democratic candidates who were removed from the ballot by Ohio Secretary of State Frank LaRose.

Following court-ordered redistricting, Somani ran in the 8th district in 2024.

=== Tenure ===
Somani discredited a bill that would ban transgender athletes in youth sports and require gender verification, stating that such exams are "invasive and uncomfortable even for adults who have a trusting relationship with their physician," and that the law would essentially be "legally forcing children to undergo medically unnecessary exams."

== Personal life ==
Somani lives in Dublin, Ohio. Her daughter Kara also practices as an obstetrician/gynecologist.
