= Bechtold =

Bechtold is a surname of German origin. Notable people with the surname include:

- Adolf Bechtold (1926–2012), German footballer
- John Bechtold (1924–1978), American politician
- Karl K. Bechtold (1910–1970), New York state senator
- Walter Bechtold (born 1947), German footballer
