= Begala =

Begala is a surname. Notable people with the surname include:

- Joe Begala (1906–1978), American football and collegiate wrestling coach
- John A. Begala, American politician
- Matúš Begala (born 2001), Slovak football midfielder
- Paul Begala (born 1961), American political consultant and political commentator
- Roman Begala (born 1999), Slovak football player
