= Mahnič =

Mahnič is a Slovenian surname. Notable people with the surname include:

- Anton Mahnič (1850–1920), Croatian-Slovenian prelate of the Catholic Church and philosopher
- Frank Mahnic Jr. (born 1946), American politician
- Žan Mahnič (born 1990), Slovenian politician
