= James Holzemer =

American politician (born 1935)

Member of the Ohio House of Representatives from the 78th district
- In office January 3, 1965 – December 31, 1968
- Preceded by: None (First)
- Succeeded by: Casey Jones

Personal details
- Born: August 30, 1935 (age 90) Toledo, Ohio
- Party: Democratic

James Marcus Holzemer (born August 30, 1935) is a former member of the Ohio House of Representatives.
