= Calvin C. Johnson =

American politician

Calvin Johnson

Member of the Ohio Senate from the 9th district
- In office January 3, 1967 – February 9, 1970
- Preceded by: District Created
- Succeeded by: Bill Bowen

Personal details
- Born: 1929
- Died: June 2018 (aged 88–89)
- Party: Democratic

Calvin Crawford Johnson Sr. (1929 – June 2018) was an American politician who served as a member of the Ohio Senate from January 3, 1967 to February 9, 1970. His district encompassed the majority of the city of Cincinnati. He resigned "for personal reasons" and was succeeded by Bill Bowen. After moving to Atlanta, Georgia, Johnson was indicted by a federal grand jury on April 13, 1971, on charges of tax evasion committed from 1965 to 1967. He pleaded no contest and was placed on probation for two years by District Judge David Stewart Porter.

He was married to Jo Ann Jones. In 1999, their son Calvin Crawford Johnson Jr. (1958–2023) was the first person exonerated by DNA evidence in Georgia after a criminal conviction, after 16 years' imprisonment for rape and burglary. He wrote a memoir, and was a leader of the Innocence Project in New York and Georgia. Johnson Sr. died in June 2018.
