= Darrell Opfer =

American politician (1941–2024)

Member of the Ohio House of Representatives from the 53rd district
- In office January 3, 1993 – August 10, 1999
- Preceded by: Fred Deering
- Succeeded by: Chris Redfern

Personal details
- Born: June 17, 1941 Elmore, Ohio, U.S.
- Died: September 20, 2024 (aged 83) Port Clinton, Ohio, U.S.
- Party: Democratic

Darrell William Opfer (June 17, 1941 – September 20, 2024) was an American politician who served as a member of the Ohio House of Representatives. He was elected to the Ohio House of Representatives in 1992 and retired in 1999. Opfer died in Port Clinton, Ohio, on September 20, 2024, at the age of 83.
