= Tristan Rader =

American politician

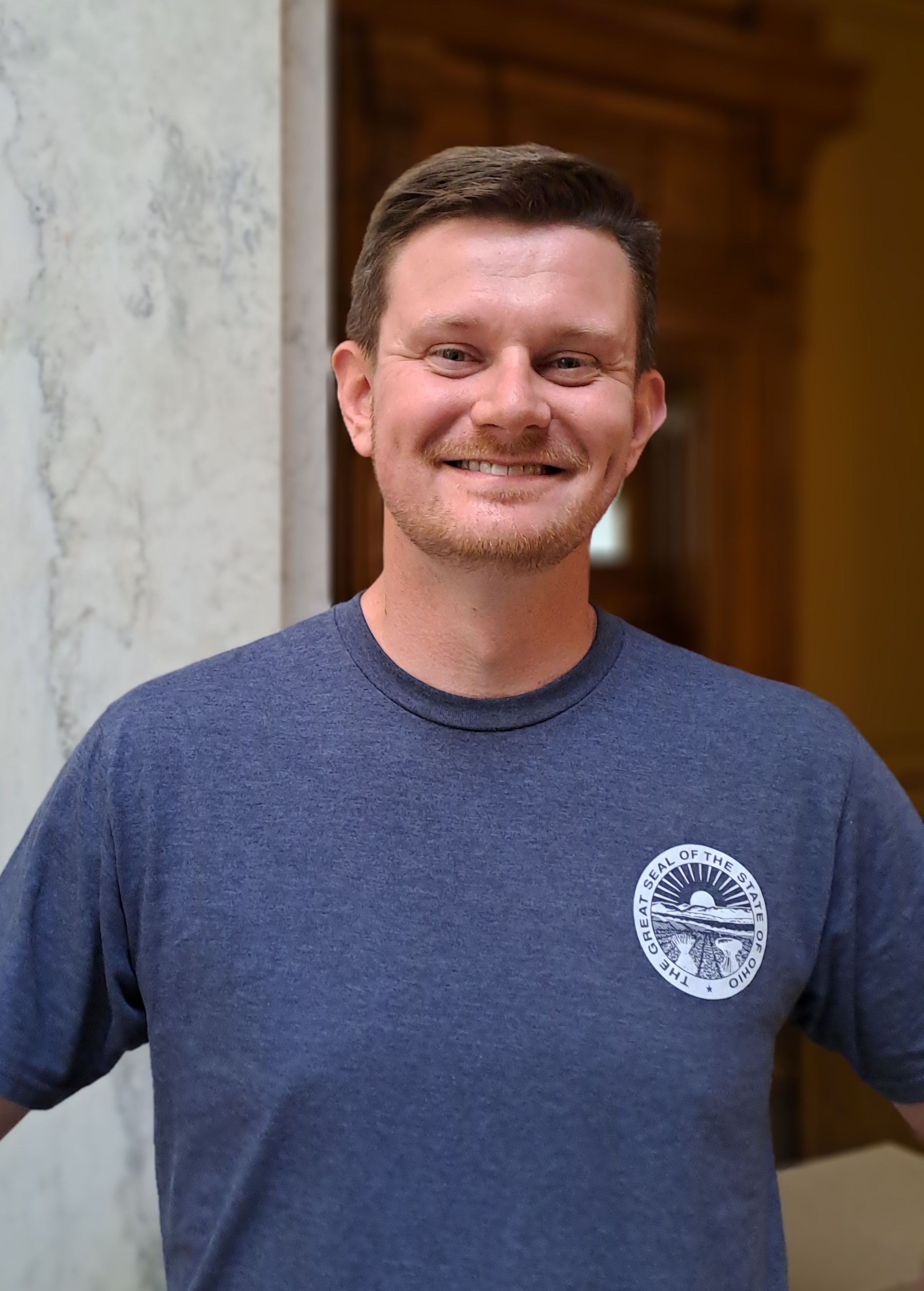

Member of the Ohio House of Representatives from the 13th district
- Preceded by: Michael J. Skindell

Personal details
- Born: May 8, 1986 (age 40) Cleveland, Ohio, U.S.
- Party: Democratic

Tristan William Rader is an American politician who is the representative for the 13th district of the Ohio House of Representatives, serving since 2025. A member of the Democratic Party, he was previously a member of the Lakewood city council.

== Political career ==
In 2016, Rader was the operations director of the Cuyahoga County Progressive Caucus, an organization that endorsed and campaigned for Bernie Sanders's presidential campaign, as well as various local progressive causes.

Rader was elected to an at-large seat of the Lakewood, Ohio, city council in 2017, taking office in 2018. He was reelected in 2021.

Rader ran in the Democratic primary for Ohio's 7th congressional district; however, he suspended his campaign on April 2. He remained on the ballot, losing to Matthew Diemer, who went on to lose the general election to Republican Max Miller.

In 2024, Democrat Michael J. Skindell, the representative of the 13th district in the Ohio House of Representatives, chose not to run for reelection. Rader ran to succeed him. He won the Democratic primary unopposed, and won the general election against Republican Robert E. Dintaman.

=== Committee assignments ===
- Energy (ranking member)
- Commerce and Labor
- Government Oversight
- Natural Resources

== Electoral history ==
2017 Lakewood city council at-large election
Party	Candidate	Votes	%
Nonpartisan	Meghan F. George	5,032	21.89
Nonpartisan	Tristan Rader	4,732	20.58
Nonpartisan	Tom Bullock (incumbent)	3,600	15.66
Nonpartisan	Cindy Marx (incumbent)	3,584	15.59
Nonpartisan	Ryan P. Nowlin (incumbent)	3,048	13.26
Nonpartisan	Brian M. Taubman	2,992	13.02
Total votes		2,288	100.0

2021 Lakewood city council at-large election
Party	Candidate	Votes	%
Nonpartisan	Sarah Kepple (incumbent)	4,221	19.74
Nonpartisan	Tristan Rader (incumbent)	4,134	19.34
Nonpartisan	Tom Bullock (incumbent)	3,610	16.89
Nonpartisan	Kyle G. Baker	3,550	16.61
Nonpartisan	Laura Rodriguez-Carbone	3,542	16.57
Nonpartisan	Mark A. Schneider	2,321	10.86
Total votes		21,378	100.0

2022 Ohio's 7th congressional district Democratic primary
Party	Candidate	Votes	%
Democratic	Matthew Diemer	12,636	62.75
Democratic	Tristan Rader	7,500	37.25
Total votes		20,136	100.0

2024 Ohio's 13th House of Representatives district Democratic primary
Party	Candidate	Votes	%
Democratic	Tristan Rader	6,836	100.0
Total votes		6,836	100.0

== Personal life ==
Rader lives with his wife, Caitlin, in downtown Lakewood.
