= John Bechtold =

American politician and attorney

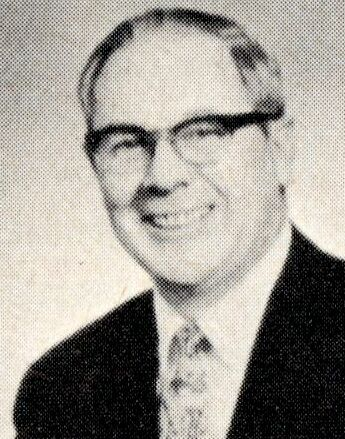

Member of the Ohio House of Representatives from the 65th district
- In office January 3, 1967 – December 31, 1972
- Preceded by: None (First)
- Succeeded by: Helen Fix

Personal details
- Born: September 2, 1924 Cincinnati, Ohio, U.S.
- Died: September 6, 1978 (aged 54) Cincinnati, Ohio, U.S.
- Party: Republican

John A. Bechtold (September 2, 1924 – September 6, 1978) was a Republican Ohio politician who served in the Ohio General Assembly. An attorney, Bechtold initially won a seat in the Ohio House of Representatives in 1966, following the 1965 Voting Rights Act's allocation of districts in Ohio. Winning reelection in 1968 and 1970, Bechtold had aspirations to succeed Charles Kurfess at the Speaker of the Ohio House of Representatives.

In 1972, redistricting weakened Bechtold's chances for reelection, and he was challenged for the nomination by Helen Fix. While it looked initially like Bechtold had secured the nomination, a recount declared Fix the winner by one vote. As a result, Bechtold's time in the legislature ended after three terms.

Following his time in the House, he returned to Cincinnati and private practice. He died on September 6, 1978, of a heart attack.
