= Suzanne Bergansky =

American politician

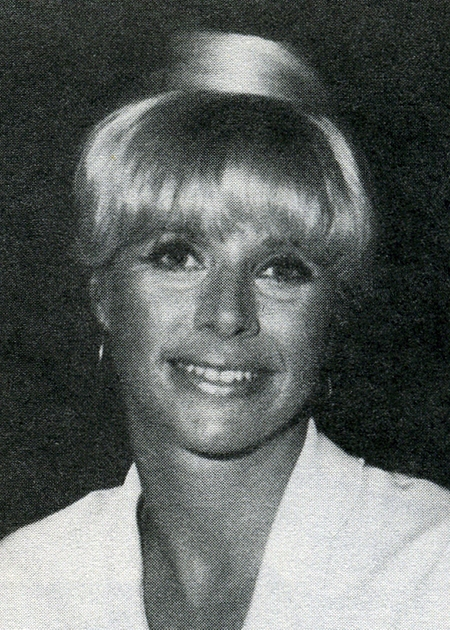

Member of the Ohio House of Representatives from the 17th district
- In office January 3, 1989 – December 31, 1992
- Preceded by: Leroy Peterson
- Succeeded by: Mike Wise

Personal details
- Born: 1944 (age 81–82)
- Party: Democratic

Suzanne Bergansky is a former member of the Ohio House of Representatives.
