= Mike Wise (politician) =

American politician

Member of the Ohio House of Representatives from the 15th district
- In office January 3, 1993 – December 31, 1998
- Preceded by: Jim Mahnic Jr.
- Succeeded by: Jim Trakas

Personal details
- Party: Republican

Mike Wise is a former member of the Ohio House of Representatives. He was first elected in 1992 from the 15th Ohio House District. He defeated the Democratic incumbent, Frank Mahnic Jr. Wise was reelected in 1994 and 1996. The most significant legislation that Wise wrote was HB 269 that placed the Mayor of Cleveland, then Michael R. White, in charge of the Cleveland school system. In 1998, he ran for Cuyahoga County Auditor against the incumbent Frank Russo and was defeated.

Wise was born on January 29th, 1962. He grew up in Chagrin Falls. Mike graduated in 1980 from Chagrin Falls Exempted Village Schools. He attended Grove City for his undergraduate degree. Mike attended Case Western Reserve Law School shortly after.

From 1999 to 2000, Mike managed the Cleveland office of then Governor Bob Taft.

From 2000 to 2006, Mike was the co-chairman of the Cuyahoga County Republican Party and was involved in the Ohio legal battles surrounding the election and reelection of George W. Bush in 2000 and 2004.

From 2006 to 2007 Mike served on the Republican State Central Committee.

Wise was elected to serve as a Trustee in Chagrin Fall Township in 2009, defeating incumbent Stephen Thomas. He was reelected to that position in 2013.

In 2019, Mike joined the board of directors at McDonald Hopkins, where he has been employed since 1998.
