= John Kellogg (Ohio politician) =

American politician

Member of the Ohio House of Representatives from the 70th district
- In office January 3, 1977-December 31, 1978
- Preceded by: Dave Johnson
- Succeeded by: Dave Johnson

Personal details
- Party: Republican

John Kellogg is a former Republican member of the Ohio House of Representatives.
