= Bill O'Neill (Ohio politician) =

American politician

Member of the Ohio House of Representatives from the 28th district
- In office January 3, 1973 – March 11, 1980
- Preceded by: New District
- Succeeded by: Dana Deshler

Personal details
- Born: c. 1947
- Party: Republican

Charles William "Dub" O'Neill, Jr. is a former member of the Ohio House of Representatives.
