= Norman Murdock =

American politician (1931–2010)

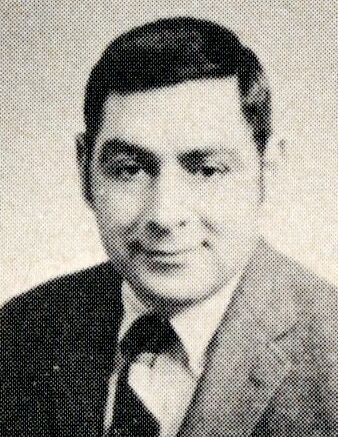

Member of the Ohio House of Representatives from the 21st district
- In office January 3, 1967-December 31, 1978
- Preceded by: None (First)
- Succeeded by: Jerome F. Luebbers

Personal details
- Born: November 6, 1931 Cincinnati, Ohio
- Died: September 11, 2010 (aged 78) Boise, Idaho
- Party: Republican

Norman Anthony Murdock (November 6, 1931 – September 11, 2010) was a former member of the Ohio House of Representatives and Common Pleas Judge.
