= Leroy Peterson =

American politician

Member of the Ohio House of Representatives from the 17th district
- In office January 3, 1983 – December 31, 1988
- Preceded by: Lee Fisher
- Succeeded by: Suzanne Bergansky

Personal details
- Party: Democratic

Leroy Peterson is a former member of the Ohio House of Representatives.
