= James Baumann =

American politician

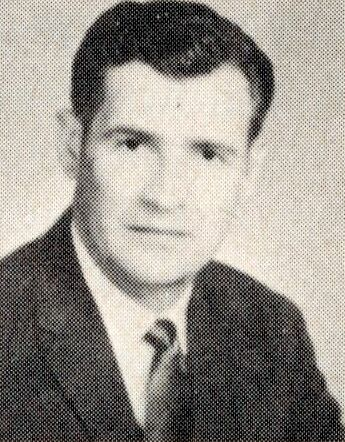

Member of the Ohio House of Representatives from the 32nd district
- In office January 3, 1971 – December 31, 1978
- Preceded by: Roger Tracy
- Succeeded by: Dean Conley

Personal details
- Party: Democratic

James L. Baumann is a former member of the Ohio House of Representatives.

James Leroy Joseph Baumann, BA, was born May 2, 1931, in Columbus, OH. He died November 24, 2017, in Naples, FL. He retired at the age of 70 after 25 years in the Plumbing and Heating Business, 32 years as a Real estate Broker, and 25 years in public service: the United States Army (1954–56); Columbus City Council (1965–69); state government (four terms in the Ohio House of Representatives (1970–78) and two terms on the Ohio Environmental Board of Review (1979-1990.)) After leaving public service he was a consultant and real property manager for a one hundred sixty unit family restaurant chain, Donatos Pizza, Gahanna, OH until 2001.

He received his elementary education at Saint Leo’s grade school in Columbus, OH, his secondary education at Saint Charles Preparatory school and an undergraduate degree at The College of Saint Charles Borromeo Seminary in Bexley, OH. His degree was in Philosophy with a minor in Education. He was accepted for graduate school at Mount Saint Mary’s Seminary in Cincinnati, OH and Notre Dame Law School but decided to change his career path and joined his father and brother in the family plumbing business. He volunteered for the United States Army. After basic and advanced armored training, he was pulled from the roster (pipeline). He served the balance of his enlistment at Headquarters Company, Fort Knox, KY., where he managed the Post Catholic religious programs. While in the service, he married E. Ann Dougherty, RN (deceased 1987). They have six children, H.Matthew, Margaret, James E., David, Lisa and Stephen. In 1991 Mr. Baumann married Jane Burns DeWitt, a Columbus high school teacher (deceased 2017), who has two children Sue Eubanks and Michael DeWitt. There are twenty-three grandchildren.

Jim Baumann, upon leaving the Army, joined with his late father, Herman E. Baumann, and his brother, Richard L. Baumann, and formed Baumann Bros Plumbing and Hydronic Co.Inc. In 1963 they developed a seven acre apartment rental complex. Jim divested his share of the plumbing company in 1977. During his career he tested for and received a Journeyman and a Master Plumbing License, an Hydronic Contractors License and a Real Estate Broker’s License.

Aside from his religious work in the Army he served as a member of the Central Ohio Catholic Social Service Agency. As chairman (two years) he guided through the resolution to make the agency independent from the Columbus Diocese. He also served on the building committee for the new parish of Our Lady of the Miraculous Medal. He is a lifetime member of the Knights of Columbus, an organization he joined at the age of 21. He is member of the Catholic Order of Foresters and the Church Our Lady of Mt Carmel, Buckeye Lake, OH and attends St. Williams Catholic Church of Naples, FL. Jim was a member and officer in the Columbus Southside Business Men’s Association. He was the first president of the Associated Plumbing and Hydronic Contractors of Central Ohio. After two years as president he requested the board hire an executive officer. While in office with the plumbers association he co-wrote a modernized revision to the Columbus, OH plumbing code. This was introduced as an ordinance and passed into law by the City Council. He was a long time member of Sertoma International. He served several terms on the Columbus Junior Theatre Board and the Southside YMCA Board and is a life member of the American Legion #144, AMVETS #51 and the Buckeye Lake Historical Society. A boater, he is a forty plus year member of the Buckeye Lake Yacht Club.

While in public service Mr. Baumann wrote and introduced into law a number of ordinances and state statutes. On City Council he was effective in supporting the controversial route of the Olentangy Freeway. He introduced and secured passage of an ordinance establishing the water and sewer rate advisory board, effectively keeping the sewer and water facilities off the real estate tax base. In the legislature he sponsored the bill to make mail-in for auto license registration available to all citizens. This meant the long lines were gone and was the most significant change the Ohio citizens (auto owners) had seen in many years. He also sponsored the boiler safety bill which was the product of the task force formed after children were killed by a malfunctioning boiler in Marrieta, OH. He served as Chairman of the Columbus City Council Service Committee, the Ohio State Boiler Safety Task Force, The Ohio House Reference Committee, The Ohio Retirement Study Commission and The Ohio Environmental Board of Review (now the Ohio Environmental Appeals Board).
