= Frank Mahnic Jr. =

American politician

Member of the Ohio House of Representatives
- In office January 2, 1989 – December 31, 1992
- Preceded by: Robert Jaskulski
- Succeeded by: Barbara C. Pringle
- Constituency: 13th district
- In office January 3, 1983 – December 31, 1984
- Preceded by: Ike Thompson
- Succeeded by: John Carroll
- Constituency: 13th district
- In office January 1, 1979 – December 31, 1982
- Preceded by: Robert Jaskulski
- Succeeded by: Barbara C. Pringle
- Constituency: 11th district

Personal details
- Born: July 10, 1946 (age 80)
- Party: Democratic

Frank Mahnic Jr. (born July 10, 1946) is a former member of the Ohio House of Representatives.

== Career ==
Mahnic first ran for state representative in 1978 to succeed outgoing representative Robert Jaskulski. He won two additional terms before retiring in 1984 to run for state senator, losing to incumbent Grace L. Drake. After his successor in the house John Carroll died, Mahnic sought appointment to his old seat, but was rejected in favor of former representative Jaskulski. He attempted to run against Jaskulski and lost in the 1986 election, but defeated him in a second attempt in 1988. Mahnic would serve one additional term before being redistricted to the 15th district alongside fellow incumbent Suzanne Bergansky, whom he defeated in the primary, but later lost the general election to Republican Mike Wise.
