= Helen Fix =

American politician (1922–2019)

Member of the Ohio House of Representatives from the 26th district
- In office January 3, 1973 – December 31, 1982
- Preceded by: John Bechtold
- Succeeded by: Lou Blessing

Personal details
- Born: September 21, 1922 Richmond, Virginia, U.S.
- Died: October 13, 2019 (aged 97) Apple Valley, California, U.S.
- Party: Republican
- Spouse: John Fix

Helen H. Fix (September 21, 1922 – October 13, 2019) was an American politician in the state of Ohio. She was a Republican member of the Ohio General Assembly. A graduate of Richmond University and a former newspaper reporter, she served on Amberley Village Council for four terms. Fix initially decided to run for the Ohio House of Representatives in 1972, following redistricting. Facing incumbent John Bechtold in the Republican primary, Fix won by only one vote. She went on to win reelection in 1974, and 1976.

In 1978, it was speculated that Fix would be appointed to replace Senator Michael Maloney in the Ohio Senate, however, the post ultimately went to Richard Finan. She was again reelected to the House in 1978 and 1980, serving as minority whip in the 114th Ohio General Assembly.

Fix did not run for reelection to the House in 1982, and was placed on the Ohio Employment Relations Board soon after. Fix died on October 13, 2019, in Apple Valley, California, at the age of 97.
