= Ross Boggs =

American politician (1938–2025)

Member of the Ohio House of Representatives
- In office January 5, 1993 – March 1, 1999
- Preceded by: Randy Gardner
- Succeeded by: George Distel
- Constituency: 5th district
- In office January 4, 1983 – January 5, 1993
- Preceded by: John Wargo
- Succeeded by: George E. Terwilleger
- Constituency: 2nd district

Personal details
- Born: June 15, 1938 Lenox Township, Ohio, U.S.
- Died: February 6, 2025 (aged 86) Lenox Township, Ohio, U.S.
- Party: Democratic
- Relations: Robert Boggs (brother) Kristin Boggs (niece)

Ross Allen Boggs Jr. (June 15, 1938 – February 6, 2025) was an American politician who served as a Democratic member of the Ohio House of Representatives from 1983 to 1999, also serving as minority leader. He was the brother of state representative and state senator Robert Boggs, and an uncle of state representative Kristin Boggs. He attended Kent State University and played for the MLB Minor Leagues on the Washington Senators. He died at his residence in Lenox Township, Ohio, on February 6, 2025, at the age of 86.

== Achievements ==
In 2025, Ross A. Boggs Jr. was honored by The Ohio House of Representatives for his extensive contribution to Ohio's legislative landscape and decades of public service.
