= Tom Roberts (Ohio politician) =

American politician

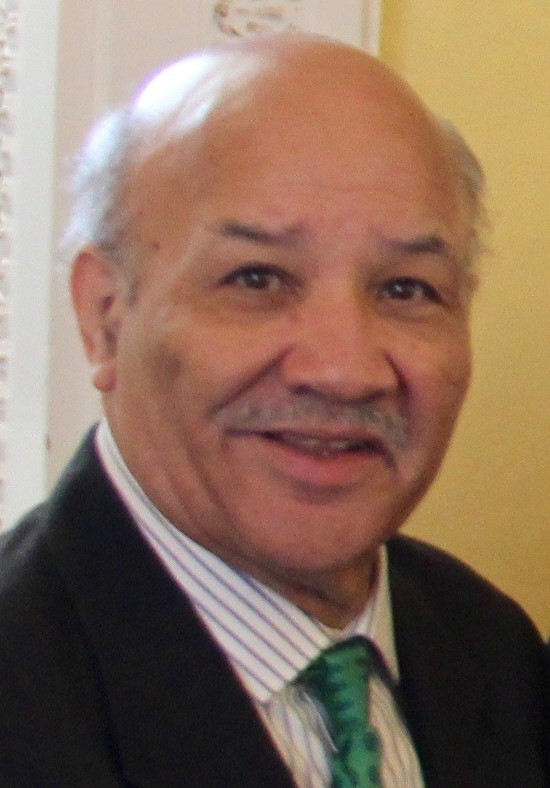

Member of the Ohio Senate from the 5th district
- In office January 9, 2002 – February 28, 2009
- Preceded by: Rhine McLin
- Succeeded by: Fred Strahorn

Member of the Ohio House of Representatives from the 39th district
- In office January 8, 1986 – December 31, 2000
- Preceded by: Ed Orlett
- Succeeded by: Fred Strahorn

Personal details
- Party: Democratic

Tom Roberts is an Ohio Democratic politician who formerly served as a member of the Ohio General Assembly.

== Career ==
=== Ohio House of Representatives ===
When Ed Orlett resigned from the Ohio House of Representatives in 1986, House Democrats appointed Roberts to serve the remainder of his term. He went on to win election that same November, and again in 1988 and 1990.

In 1992, Roberts was challenged by his predecessor, Ed Orlett, for the Democratic nomination, however Roberts ultimately won the primary election. He went on to win reelection in 1994, and 1996 as well.

=== State Senate ===
By 1998, term limits did not allow Roberts to seek another term in 2000, and he was succeeded by his former aide, Fred Strahorn. He instead decided to run for Montgomery County Commissioner, but lost in a landslide.

Following Rhine McLin's victory to become Mayor of Dayton, Ohio, in 2001, her state Senate seat became vacant. As a result, Roberts was appointed to serve the remainder of her term, and went on to win his own full term in 2002. He won reelection in 2006 and served as assistant minority leader in the 127th General Assembly.

=== Ohio Civil Rights Commission ===
By 2009, Roberts was unable to run again for his Senate seat. As a result, Ohio Governor Ted Strickland appointed Roberts to the Ohio Civil Rights Commission. He therefore was required to resign his Senate seat, and was replaced again by Fred Strahorn.

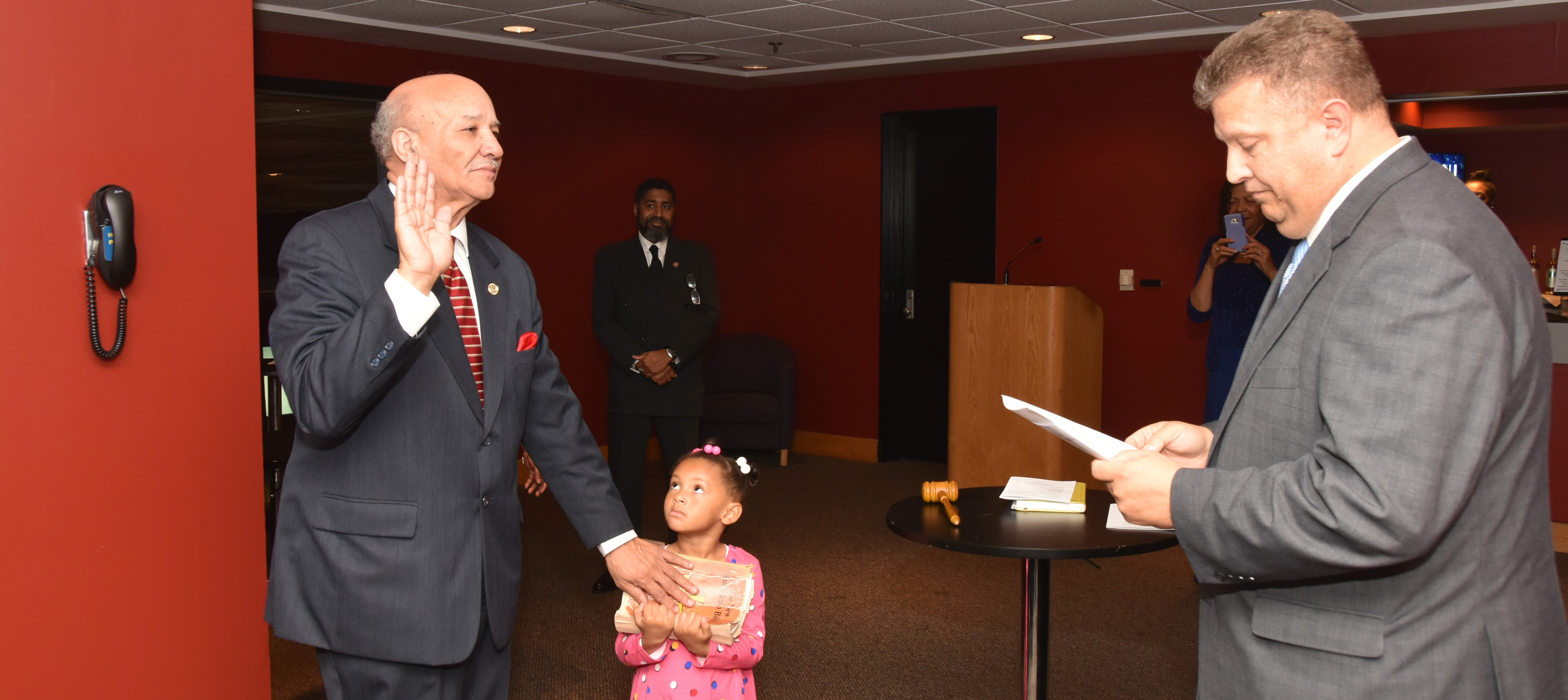
Judge Christopher Roberts Administers Oath of Office to Ohio NAACP President Tom Roberts

=== NAACP involvement ===
On September 9, 2017, the Ohio Conference NAACP held its biennial election with terms commencing on September 9, 2017, and expiring on September 14, 2019. Roberts, 2nd Vice President of the Dayton Unit of the National Association for the Advancement of Colored People NAACP, was elected to serve as President of the Ohio Conference NAACP. Roberts defeated Arlene Anderson, Secretary of the Cleveland Unit NAACP and received 68.85% of the votes.

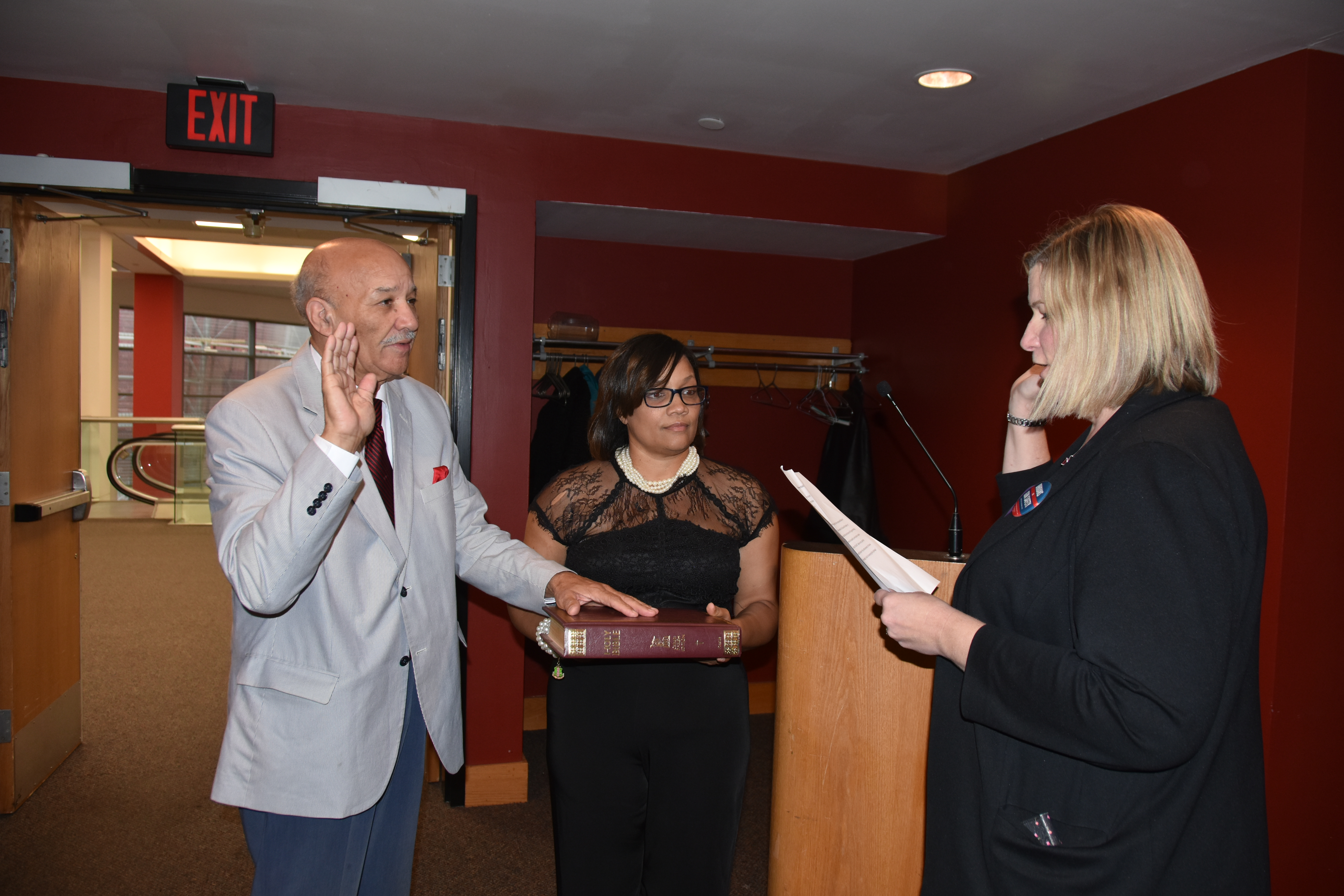
Dayton Mayor Nan Whaley Administers Oath of Office to Ohio NAACP President Tom Roberts

On September 14, 2019, the Ohio Conference NAACP held its biennial election with terms commencing on September 14, 2019, and expiring on September 11, 2021. Roberts was re-elected to serve as President of the Ohio Conference NAACP. Roberts defeated Arlean Anderson, of Cleveland, Ohio and received 87.30% of the votes.

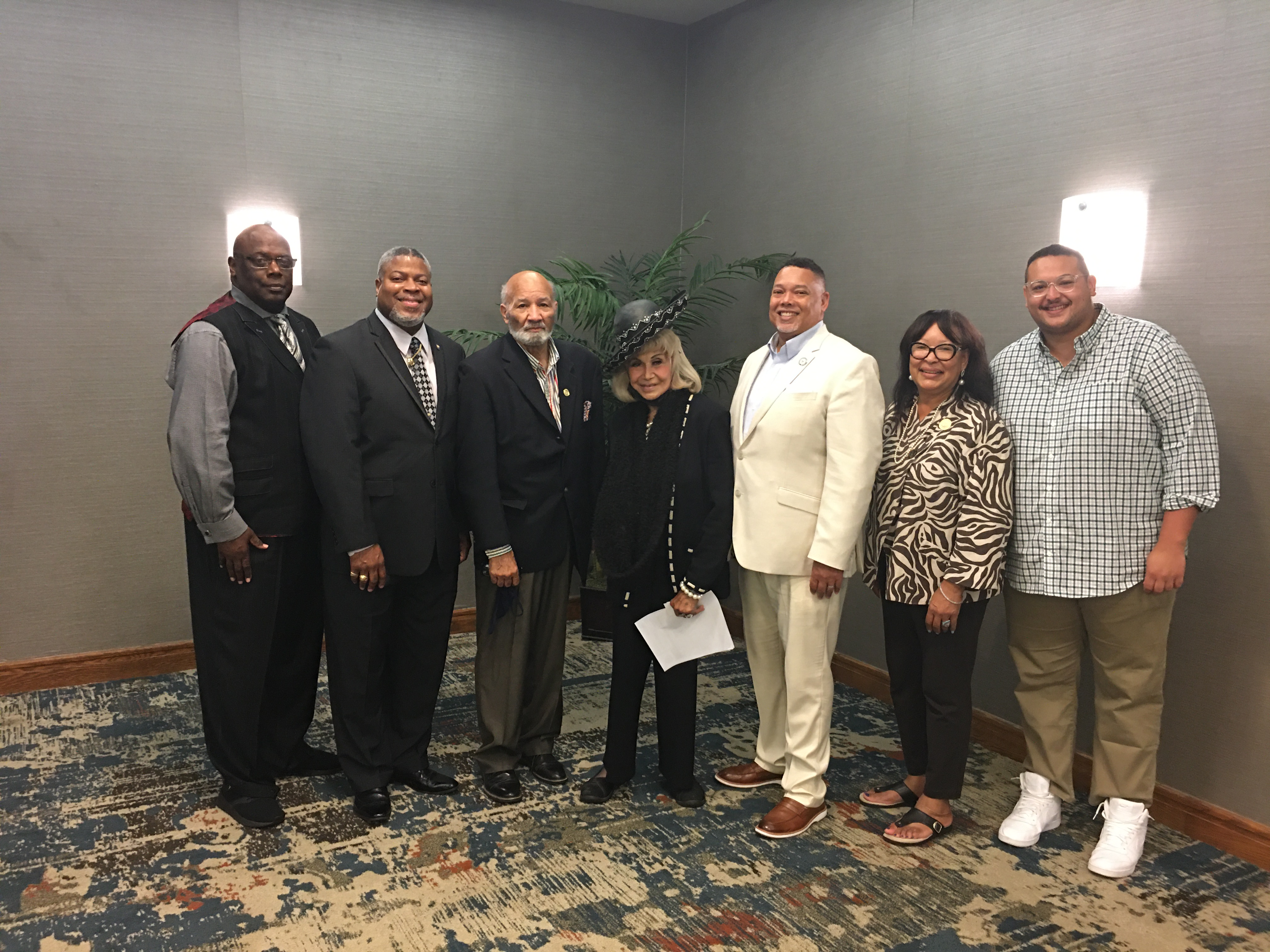
Roberts poses with his new leadership tearm:1st Vice President Derrick L. Foward, 2nd Vice President Andre Washington, 3rd Vice President Ophelia Averitt, Secretary Dora Bronston, Treasurer Willie Perryman, Assistant Secretary Oliver Warren

On September 11, 2021, Roberts was re-elected as President of the Ohio Conference NAACP. Roberts defeated Joe Mallory, President of the Cincinnati NAACP, and received 55% of the votes.

On September 9, 2023, Roberts was re-elected to his fourth 2-year term as President of the Ohio Conference NAACP. Roberts ran unopposed.
