= Madeline Cain =

American politician (1949–2022)

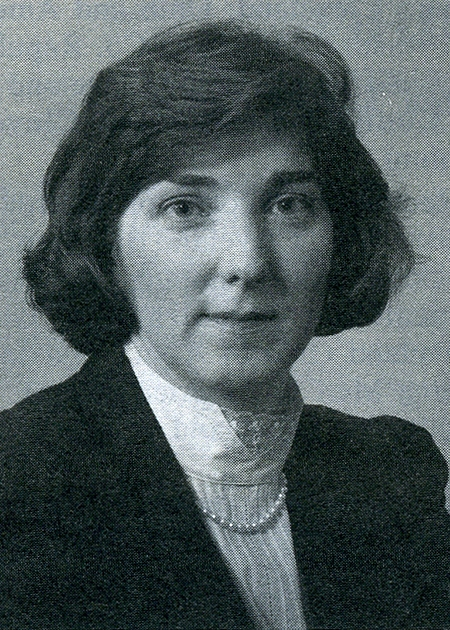

Member of the Ohio House of Representatives from the 17th district
- In office January 3, 1989 – December 31, 1995
- Preceded by: Francine Panehal
- Succeeded by: Dan Brady

Personal details
- Born: Madeline A. Cain; November 21, 1949 Cleveland, Ohio, U.S.
- Died: April 4, 2022 (aged 72) Lakewood, Ohio, U.S.
- Party: Democratic

Madeline A. Cain (November 21, 1949 – April 4, 2022) was a member of the Ohio House of Representatives and the first woman mayor of Lakewood, Ohio. Cain had previously represented a portion of Cuyahoga County for four terms (7 years) in the Ohio House of Representatives.

== Early years ==
The second of four daughters born to Mary Rita (née Quinn) and Edward V. Cain, she grew up on West 104th street in Cleveland. Her father was a Cleveland prosecutor.

She attended St. Augustine Academy and, at age 18, joined the Sisters of Charity. She served eight years with the Catholic Church, graduating from Ursuline College with a degree in English and Theology and subsequently teaching at her alma mater.

== Affiliations ==
Cain was active in several political and civic organizations, including Lakewood Business and Professional Women, Lakewood Chamber of Commerce, Cudell Neighborhood Improvement Inc., West Boulevard Neighborhood Association, Citizens League of Greater Cleveland, Cuyahoga County Women’s Political Caucus, Lakewood Democratic Club, City Club, Cuyahoga County Democratic party, and the Ohio Women's Policy and Research Commission.
