= Jim Davis (Ohio politician) =

American politician

Member of the Ohio House of Representatives from the 85th district
- In office January 3, 1985 – December 31, 1994
- Preceded by: Dale Locker
- Succeeded by: Jim Jordan

Personal details
- Born: April 11, 1935
- Died: July 19, 2011 (aged 76) St. Marys, Ohio, U.S.
- Party: Republican

James D. Davis (April 11, 1935 – July 19, 2011) was a Republican member of the Ohio House of Representatives, representing the 85th District from 1985 until 1994, when he opted to not seek re-election. Davis taught industrial arts at St. Marys Memorial High School for 28 years and worked on the football coaching staff for several years. Davis also served on the St. Marys City Council, and was the council president in 1978 and 1979. Davis was known for legislation in the 1990s that sought to require the licensure of cats. He died in 2011.
