= Jim Ross (politician) =

American politician

Member of the Ohio House of Representatives from the 94th district
- In office January 3, 1979 – December 31, 1982
- Preceded by: Rex Kieffer Jr.
- Succeeded by: Joe Secrest

Personal details
- Party: Democratic

Jim Ross is a former member of the Ohio House of Representatives in 1979–82.
