= John Carroll (Ohio politician) =

American politician

Member of the Ohio House of Representatives from the 13th district
- In office January 3, 1985-January 11, 1985
- Preceded by: Jim Mahnic Jr.
- Succeeded by: Robert Jaskulski

Personal details
- Died: January 11, 1985 (aged 29) Garfield Heights, Ohio
- Party: Democratic

John D. "Jay" Carroll III was a former member of the Ohio House of Representatives.

He was found dead in his home on January 11, 1985, just five days after he had taken his oath of office for his first elected position in the Ohio House of Representatives.

He was a 1973 graduate of St. Xavier High School.
