= Tom Fries =

American politician

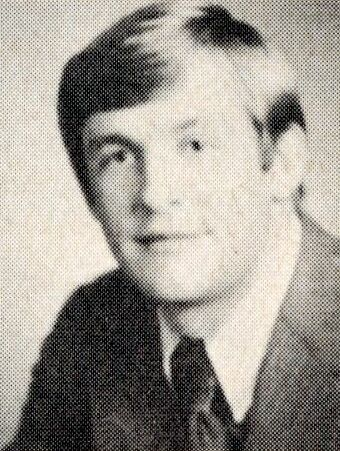

Member of the Ohio Senate from the 6th district
- In office December 13, 1982-March 6, 1984
- Preceded by: Chuck Curran
- Succeeded by: Tom Talbot

Member of the Ohio House of Representatives from the 35th district
- In office January 3, 1971-December 13, 1982
- Preceded by: James Pippenger
- Succeeded by: Bob Hickey

Personal details
- Born: Thomas Louis Fries; September 28, 1942 (age 83) Dayton, Ohio, U.S.
- Party: Democratic

Thomas Louis Fries (born September 28, 1942) is Democratic politician who formerly served in the Ohio General Assembly. From Dayton, Ohio, Fries is a former Minor League Baseball player, and played for the Washington Senators and the Minnesota Twins organizations. He also worked for the Gulf Oil Corporation before entering politics.

In 1970, Fries won a seat in the Ohio House of Representatives and was seated on January 3, 1971. By his second term, he was serving as the top Democrat on the House Local Government Committee, and was named Chairman after the Democrats won the majority following the 1974 election cycle. In all, Fries would serve six terms, or twelve years, as a state representative.

Following Charles Curran's resignation from the Ohio Senate in 1982, Fries was appointed to replace him. Up for election for a full term in 1984, Fries instead opted to retire, and resigned ten months early from the end of his term. He was replaced by Tom Talbot, who would go on to lose to Chuck Horn in the general election.

Following public service, Fries started his own consulting firm in Dayton.
