= Joe Haines (politician) =

American politician

Joseph Haines

Member of the Ohio House of Representatives from the 74th district
- In office January 3, 1981 – November 4, 1999
- Preceded by: Bob McEwen
- Succeeded by: Chris Widener

Personal details
- Born: September 23, 1923 Xenia, Ohio, U.S.
- Died: January 5, 2015 (aged 91) Xenia, Ohio, U.S.

Joseph E. Haines (September 23, 1923 – January 5, 2015) was an American politician.

Haines served in the Ohio House of Representatives from 1981 to 1999 as a Republican. In 1999, Haines resigned from the Ohio General Assembly to take a job in the Ohio Department of Agriculture. Born in Xenia, Ohio, Haines received his bachelor's degree in rural economy and farm management from Ohio State University and was a farmer. He died in 2015 in Xenia, Ohio.
