= Dana Deshler =

American politician

Dana A. Deshler

Member of the Ohio House of Representatives from the 28th district
- In office March 11, 1980 – December 31, 1984
- Preceded by: Bill O'Neil
- Succeeded by: Bill Schuck

Personal details
- Party: Republican

Dana A. Deshler (April 8, 1937 – September 16, 2012) was a former member of the Ohio House of Representatives.
