= Kenneth Cox =

American politician (1928–2026)

Kenneth R. Cox
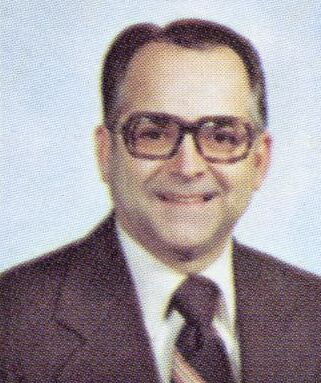

Member of the Ohio Senate from the 28th district
- In office January 3, 1977 – December 31, 1982
- Preceded by: David Headley
- Succeeded by: Marcus Roberto

Member of the Ohio House of Representatives from the 41st district
- In office January 3, 1973 – December 31, 1976
- Preceded by: David Headley
- Succeeded by: Bob Nettle

Personal details
- Born: October 8, 1928 Coventry Township, Ohio, U.S.
- Died: July 1, 2026 (aged 97)
- Party: Democratic

Kenneth R. Cox (October 8, 1928 – July 1, 2026) was an American politician who was a Democratic member of the Ohio General Assembly.

== Life and career ==
Kenneth R. Cox was born in Coventry Township, Ohio, on October 8, 1928. He attended the University of Akron. He was serving as mayor of Barberton, Ohio, when he opted to run for an open seat in the Ohio House of Representatives in 1972. He ended up being reelected in 1974. In 1976, Senator David Headley announced his retirement, and Cox won election to his Ohio Senate seat.

In 1982, Cox considered a run for Ohio Treasurer, and eventually entered the race. However, he lost the primary nomination. While defeated in the treasurer's election, new Ohio Governor Dick Celeste announced soon after that he would appoint Cox as the Director for the Department of Public Safety.

Celeste again appointed Cox as Department of Commerce Director in 1985. Two years later, he left state government to work as a private consultant. He went on to return to his roots, running for Barberton City Council in 1993 and winning a seat, and has since advocated for his local communities.

Cox died on July 1, 2026, at the age of 97.
