= Bill Donham =

American politician

Member of the Ohio House of Representatives from the 57th district
- In office January 3, 1973 – December 31, 1984
- Preceded by: David Armbruster
- Succeeded by: John Boehner

Personal details
- Born: August 21, 1918 Middletown, Ohio, United States
- Died: April 15, 1998 (aged 79) Middletown, Ohio, United States
- Party: Republican

William W. Donham (August 21, 1918 – April 15, 1998) was a member of the Ohio House of Representatives.
