= Dick Maier =

American politician (1925–2017)

Member of the Ohio House of Representatives from the 48th district
- In office January 3, 1973 – 1981
- Preceded by: Richard Reichel

Personal details
- Born: October 9, 1925 Massillon, Ohio, U.S.
- Died: May 17, 2017 (aged 91) Massillon, Ohio, U.S.
- Party: Republican

Richard Franklin Maier (October 9, 1925 – May 17, 2017) was an American politician who served as a Republican member of the Ohio House of Representatives from 1973 to 1981.
