= Harry E. Turner =

American politician

Harry Turner

Member of the Ohio House of Representatives from the 76th district
- In office January 3, 1973 – December 31, 1984
- Preceded by: Kenneth Creasy
- Succeeded by: Tom Van Meter

Personal details
- Party: Republican

Harry E. Turner Sr. (December 25, 1927 – July 27, 2004) served in the Ohio House of Representatives.

Turner was married and had a son. He died in 2004 at the Knox Community Hospital in Mount Vernon, Ohio.
