= Larry Hughes (politician) =

American politician (1931–2000)

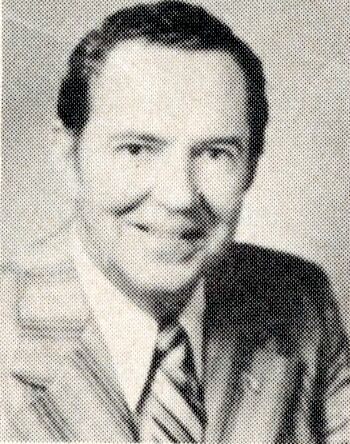

Member of the Ohio House of Representatives from the 66th district
- In office January 3, 1969-December 31, 1982
- Preceded by: Robert E. Holmes
- Succeeded by: David J. Leland

Personal details
- Born: September 18, 1931
- Died: September 1, 2000 (aged 68) Riverside, Ohio
- Party: Republican

Lawrence Edward Hughes Sr. (September 18, 1931 – September 1, 2000) was a member of the Ohio House of Representatives. He died in 2000. He is the father of state Senator Jim Hughes.
