= Dale Locker =

American politician (1929–2011)

Member of the Ohio House of Representatives from the 81st district
- In office January 3, 1973-December 31, 1984
- Preceded by: Robert Wilhelm
- Succeeded by: Jim Davis

Personal details
- Born: November 2, 1929 Sidney, Ohio
- Died: August 14, 2011 (aged 81) Anna, Ohio
- Party: Democratic
- Spouse: LaDonna Limbert

Dale Leroy Locker (November 2, 1929 – August 14, 2011) was a former Democratic member of the Ohio House of Representatives, representing the 80th District from 1973 to 1984. He also ran for a seat in the United States House of Representatives in a 1981 special election, but lost to Michael Oxley by less than 500 votes.

He died at his home in 2011.
