= Bob Nader =

American politician (1928–2019)

Robert A. (Bob) Nader

Member of the Ohio House of Representatives from the 55th district
- In office January 3, 1971 – December 31, 1982
- Preceded by: Larry Nord
- Succeeded by: Michael G. Verich

Personal details
- Born: March 31, 1928 Warren, Ohio
- Died: March 15, 2019 Warren, Ohio
- Party: Democratic
- Profession: Attorney, Politician, Judge

Robert Alexander Nader (March 31, 1928—March 15, 2019) was an American Democratic politician who served as a city councilman, state representative and judge in Ohio.

== Early life ==
Nader was born in Warren, Ohio, the son of Nassef J. and Emily Nader, who were Lebanese immigrants of Maronite Catholic heritage. He attended Warren G. Harding High School in Warren where he excelled in football, earning recognition on the 1945 All-Ohio team. After his high school graduation in 1946 he enrolled at The Ohio State University where he successfully walked on to the football team in spring practice. He left Ohio State to enlist in the U.S. Army from 1946 to 1948, then attended Adelbert College of Western Reserve University in Cleveland, graduating in 1950. He attended Western Reserve Law School and graduated in 1953.

== Political career ==
After graduation Nader went into the practice of law in Warren with his brother, Paul G. Nader. In 1960 he was elected at large to Warren City Council where he served until 1966. Beginning in 1971 he served in the Ohio House of Representatives, representing the 98th — later the 55th — district. He continued as a state representative until 1982, during which time he served as Chairman of the Judiciary and Reference Committees.

Nader was then appointed and later elected as a Judge of the Trumbull County (Ohio) Common Pleas Court which he served from 1982 until 1990, followed by an appointment and election as a Judge of the 11th District Court of Appeals, from which he retired in 2002. He served by assignment on the Ohio Supreme Court on several occasions until 2007.

One of Nader's most noteworthy appellate opinions was written in dissent when a rehearing was granted in the Ninth District Court of Appeals after that court had overturned a $212 million verdict awarded in a business lawsuit, following claims that the judge who wrote the opinion had received large campaign contributions over many years from the CEO of the winning party. The new appellate panel refused to review the first appellate decision on procedural grounds. Nader dissented, writing that the initial decision “was infected by approximately $1 million in contributions from a very financially interested individual,” resulting in “a classic scenario giving rise to every nuance of political influence in our courts which calls for self-disqualification.” This dissent was noted in a 2008 New York Times article concerning the effects of campaign contributions on judges’ decisions.

== Personal life ==
Nader married Nancy M. Veauthier, a career public school teacher, in 1975. Nader was a founding member and patron of Trumbull New Theatre, and frequently acted in its productions. He was active in many public and civic organizations, including the Family Service Association, the City of Warren Police and Fire Pension Boards and Elks. His work for justice and reform was recognized by multiple awards, including from the American Arbitration Association, Kent State University Trumbull County, and the Children's Rehabilitation Center.

== Robert A. Nader Trust ==
Nader established a trust which is directed, in part, to benefit the citizens of Trumbull County, Ohio and the Mahoning Valley. The philanthropic activities of the Robert A Nader Family Trust include support of local non-profit institutions and other charitable causes.
