= Ed Orlett =

American politician (1933–2019)

Member of the Ohio House of Representatives from the 34th district
- In office January 3, 1973 – January 8, 1986
- Preceded by: David Albritton
- Succeeded by: Tom Roberts

Personal details
- Born: October 13, 1933 Ohio, U.S.
- Died: August 22, 2019 (aged 85)
- Party: Republican

Edward J. Orlett (October 13, 1933 – August 22, 2019) was an American politician who was a Democratic member of the Ohio House of Representatives. He died on August 22, 2019, at the age of 85.
