= Robert Jaskulski =

American politician (1926–2002)

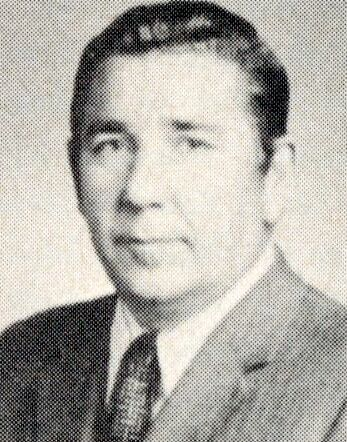

Member of the Ohio House of Representatives from the 13th district
- In office January 2, 1987 – December 31, 1988
- Preceded by: John Carroll
- Succeeded by: Frank Mahnic Jr.
- In office January 3, 1971 – December 31, 1978
- Preceded by: Donald Nowack
- Succeeded by: Frank Mahnic

Personal details
- Born: December 16, 1926
- Died: April 26, 2002 (aged 75) Cleveland, Ohio, US
- Party: Democratic

Robert Jaskulski (December 16, 1926 – April 26, 2002) was an American politician. He served member of the Ohio House of Representatives from the 13th district.
