= Arthur Bowers =

American politician (1919–1988)

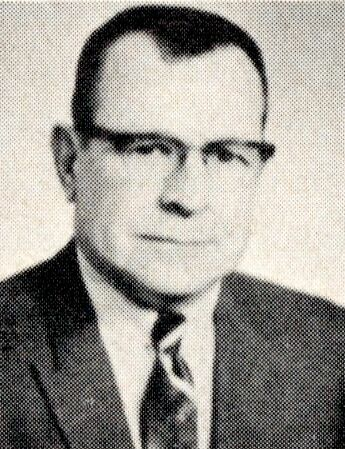

Member of the Ohio House of Representatives from the 98th district
- In office January 3, 1969 – December 31, 1986
- Preceded by: Douglas Applegate
- Succeeded by: Jerry W. Krupinski

Personal details
- Born: February 16, 1919 Steubenville, Ohio
- Died: May 21, 1988 (aged 69) Orlando, Florida
- Party: Democratic

Arthur Robert Bowers (February 16, 1919 – May 21, 1988) was a Democratic politician who served in the Ohio House of Representatives. A Steubenville, Ohio, native, Bowers initially won election to a seat in the Ohio House in 1962, when apportionment was still chosen at-large. He won re-election in 1964, but was not a candidate for re-election in 1966.

When Representative Douglas Applegate opted to run for the Ohio Senate in 1968, Bowers made a political comeback and again ran for a seat in the Ohio House. He won, and was seated again on January 3, 1969. He won re-election in 1970.

In 1972, Bowers was named Chairman of the Transportation and Highways Committee. He served in that role for the rest of his House career, and was pivotal in requiring seat belts in Ohio automobiles.

In January 1986, Bowers announced his retirement from the House.
