= John Galbraith (Ohio politician) =

American politician (1923–2021)

Member of the Ohio House of Representatives from the 48th district
- In office January 3, 1967 – December 31, 1986
- Preceded by: None (First)
- Succeeded by: Arlene Singer

Personal details
- Born: August 23, 1923 Toledo, Ohio, U.S.
- Died: December 21, 2021 (aged 98) Maumee, Ohio, U.S.
- Party: Republican

John Allen Galbraith (August 23, 1923 – December 21, 2021) was an American politician who served as a member of the Ohio House of Representatives. Galbraith died in Maumee, Ohio, on December 21, 2021, at the age of 98.
