= Dean Conley =

American politician

Member of the Ohio House of Representatives from the 32nd district
- In office January 3, 1979 – December 31, 1992
- Preceded by: James Baumann
- Succeeded by: Jim Mason

Personal details
- Born: April 15, 1946 Paintsville, Kentucky, United States
- Died: May 19, 2010 (aged 64) Columbus, Ohio, United States
- Party: Democratic

Harold "Dean" Conley (April 15, 1946 – May 19, 2010) was a former member of the Ohio House of Representatives. serving for a total of 7 times, and was instrumental in passing 60 laws.

He spent the majority of his life in Columbus, Ohio where he attended Ohio State University.
