= Waldo Rose =

American politician

Member of the Ohio House of Representatives from the 1st district
- In office January 3, 1973 – December 31, 1986
- Preceded by: Walter White
- Succeeded by: Bill Thompson

Personal details
- Party: Republican

Waldo Bennett "Ben" Rose is a former member of the Ohio House of Representatives, serving from 1973 to 1986. Presently, he is the assistant director of the Ohio Department of Health.

== Footnotes ==
Party political offices
Preceded by Vincent C. Campanella	Republican nominee for Ohio State Auditor; 1986	Succeeded by Jim Petro
