= Marcus Roberto =

American politician

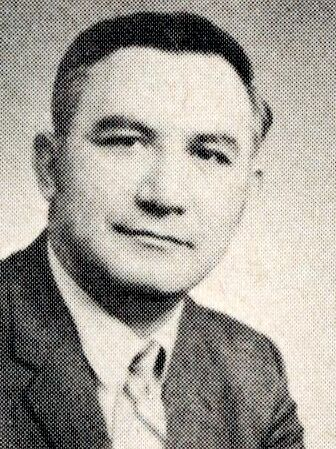

Member of the Ohio Senate from the 28th district
- In office January 3, 1983 – February 26, 1986
- Preceded by: Kenneth Cox
- Succeeded by: Bob Nettle
- In office January 3, 1977 – December 31, 1982
- Preceded by: David W. Johnson
- Succeeded by: Robert Boggs

Member of the Ohio House of Representatives from the 62nd district
- In office January 3, 1971 – December 31, 1976
- Preceded by: Anice Johnson
- Succeeded by: John A. Begala

Personal details
- Born: November 26, 1930 New Milford, Ohio, U.S.
- Died: February 24, 1986 (aged 55)
- Party: Democratic

Marcus Aurelius Roberto (November 26, 1930 – February 24, 1986), a Democrat, was a member of the Ohio General Assembly. Roberto initially won a seat in the Ohio House of Representatives in 1970, replacing Anice Johnson, and won reelection in 1972 and 1974. However, Roberto sought to move up to the Ohio Senate in 1976. Challenging David W. Johnson, Roberto won, and took his seat in the Senate in 1977. He was reelected in 1980.

In 1982, Roberto opted to run for a seat in the United States House of Representatives against Congressman J. William Stanton. He ended up losing the nomination to Dennis Eckart. Switching over to a new district following redistricting, Roberto won reelection in 1984.

After battling cancer for months, Roberto died from cancer on February 25, 1986, midway through his third term in office.
