= Vernon Cook =

American politician

Member of the Ohio House of Representatives from the 43rd district
- In office January 3, 1973 – November 23, 1987
- Preceded by: Morris Boyd
- Succeeded by: Wayne Jones

Personal details
- Born: July 10, 1927 Kent, Ohio
- Died: November 23, 1987 (aged 60) Cuyahoga Falls, Ohio
- Party: Democratic
- Education: Ohio State University

Vernon Floyd Cook (July 10, 1927 – November 23, 1987) is a former member of the Ohio House of Representatives. and former faculty member of the University of Akron Political Science Department.

Cook was the first Director of the Ray C. Bliss Institute of Applied Politics.

He was a cousin of former U.S. Representative Robert E. Cook.

== Early life and military service ==
Cook was born in Kent, Ohio. He left high school in 1944 to enlist in the United States Army Air Corps, and served as a cryptographer for the 231st AAF BU. He was stationed in Alamogordo, New Mexico, England, and Germany as part of Operation Paperclip.

After his discharge from active duty, Cook served in the United States Army Reserve and obtained the rank of captain. His reserve duties included teaching cryptographic and interrogation techniques at Fort George G. Meade.

He married Sharen Louise Mills from Fort Lauderdale, Florida.

== Education ==
Cook graduated from Ohio State University in 1951. He also attended Miami University.

He was posthumously awarded an honorary Ph.D. from the University of Akron in 1988.

== Career ==
=== Teaching ===
Cook was an assistant professor of political science at Ohio Wesleyan University and Case Western Reserve University before becoming an associate professor at the University of Akron in 1965. He continued in that position after being elected to public office, until his death in 1987.

=== Politics ===
Cook was first elected to the Ohio House of Representatives in 1972. In 1979, he was made Assistant Majority Floor Leader. He served on the Finance and Appropriations committee, the Ethics and Standards committee, the Rules committee and was chair of the Joint Committee on Agency Rule Review.

=== Bliss Institute ===
In 1987, Cook was made the first director of the Ray C. Bliss Institute of Applied Politics at the University of Akron. Although Cook had been Ray C. Bliss's choice, Cook's appointment was controversial.

Despite some partisan wrangling, Cook was eventually given the post.

An internship named for Cook provides students with the practical experience in politics.
