= David Johnson (Ohio politician) =

American politician

Member of the Ohio House of Representatives from the 55th district
- In office January 3, 1979-December 31, 1994
- Preceded by: John Kellogg
- Succeeded by: Kirk Schuring
- In office January 3, 1975-December 31, 1976
- Preceded by: Robert Levitt
- Succeeded by: John Kellogg

Personal details
- Party: Republican

David Johnson is a former member of the Ohio House of Representatives. He is also the current county chairman of the Columbiana County Republican Party.
