= Jerome F. Luebbers =

American politician (born 1946)

Jerome Luebbers

Member of the Ohio House of Representatives from the 33rd district
- In office January 3, 1979-December 31, 2000
- Preceded by: Norman Murdock
- Succeeded by: Steve Driehaus

Personal details
- Born: {January 23, 1942).
- Party: Democratic

Jerome F. Luebbers (born 1942) was a member of the Ohio House of Representatives, serving from 1979 until 2000. Initially winning election against Norman Murdock in 1978, he went on to serve for eleven terms in the House. Term limits forced him out in 2000, and he was succeeded by future Congressman Steve Driehaus in 2001.
