= Marie Tansey =

American politician (1930–2016)

Member of the Ohio House of Representatives from the 72nd district
- In office January 3, 1977 – December 31, 1988
- Preceded by: Ethel Swanbeck
- Succeeded by: Katherine Walsh

Personal details
- Born: January 6, 1930 Elyria, Ohio
- Died: March 10, 2016 (aged 86) Vermilion, Ohio, U.S.
- Party: Republican

Iva Lee Marie Tansey (January 6, 1930 – March 10, 2016) was a member of the Ohio House of Representatives.
