= Walter McClaskey =

American politician

Member of the Ohio House of Representatives from the 86th district
- In office January 3, 1973 – December 31, 1986
- Preceded by: Lloyd Kerns
- Succeeded by: Larry Adams

Personal details
- Born: July 29, 1918 Marion, Ohio
- Died: July 16, 1988 (aged 69) near Marion, Ohio
- Party: Republican

Walter Donald McClaskey (July 29, 1918 – July 16, 1988) was a member of the Ohio House of Representatives.
