= John A. Begala =

American politician

John Begala

Member of the Ohio House of Representatives from the 62nd district
- In office January 3, 1977 – December 31, 1982
- Preceded by: Marcus Roberto
- Succeeded by: Paul Jones

John Begala is a former member of the Ohio House of Representatives.

== Career ==
Prior to his election, he was a Councilman-at-Large in Kent, Ohio. As a member of city council, he was part of a coalition that successfully campaigned to amend the city charter, creating a council-manager form of government. As a state legislator, he worked primarily on health and social legislation and oversight, authoring legislation on social service planning and nursing home reform. In the field of senior services, he led initiatives to subsidize geriatric medicine programs in state-supported medical schools and establish a statewide network of multi-purpose senior centers.

After his third term, Begala became deputy director and chief of staff at the Ohio Department of Mental Retardation and Disabilities and director of the Ohio Developmental Disabilities Planning Council. He developed budget initiatives increasing state funding for special education, expanding home and community services, and stabilizing finance of residential facilities.

From 1986 until 1998, Begala held executive leadership positions with the Greater Cincinnati Hospital Council, University of Cincinnati Medical Center, and Greater Cleveland's MetroHealth System. From 1998 to 2005, and again from 2008 through 2014, he was Executive Director of The Center for Community Solutions (formerly Federation for Community Planning), a health, social and economic policy think tank with offices in Cleveland and Columbus, Ohio. Since 2004, Begala has been a lecturer at Baldwin Wallace University, where in 2013 he was appointed Executive in Residence. Begala currently teaches at The Ohio State University.
