= Tom Van Meter =

American politician

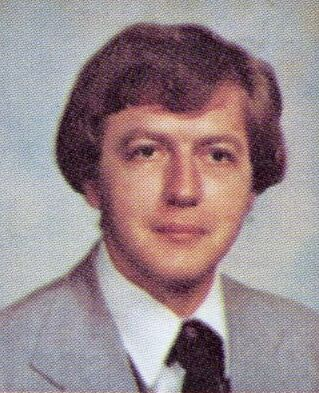

Member of the Ohio Senate from the 19th district
- In office January 3, 1973-December 31, 1982
- Preceded by: Kenneth F. Berry
- Succeeded by: Lowell Steinbrenner

Member of the Ohio House of Representatives from the 76th district
- In office January 3, 1985-December 31, 1986
- Preceded by: Harry Turner
- Succeeded by: Eugene Byers

Personal details
- Born: April 22, 1943 Ashland, Ohio
- Died: March 7, 1992 (aged 48) Cleveland, Ohio
- Party: Republican

Thomas A. Van Meter (April 22, 1943 – March 7, 1992) was a member of the Ohio General Assembly. He served in the Ohio Senate from 1973 to 1982, representing the 19th District. He also ran for the Republican nomination for governor in 1978, eventually losing to former Ohio Governor Jim Rhodes. He eventually returned to the General Assembly, serving in the Ohio House of Representatives for one term. He ran for the Republican nomination in 1982, finishing 3rd to Bud Brown.

He died of cancer in 1992.
