= Fred Deering =

American politician

Member of the Ohio House of Representatives from the 70th district
- In office January 3, 1973 – December 31, 1992
- Preceded by: Howard Knight
- Succeeded by: Darrell Opfer

Personal details
- Born: May 9, 1923 Oxford Township, Ohio
- Died: March 15, 2010 (aged 86) Monroeville, Ohio
- Party: Democratic

Frederick Henry Deering (May 9, 1923 – March 15, 2010) was a former member of the Ohio House of Representatives.

== Early life and education ==
A 1941 graduate of Monroeville High School (Ohio), Deering attended Ohio State University.

== Career ==
Deering was nicknamed “Freeway Fred” because of his support to remove tolls from the Ohio Turnpike. He was also a commissioner of the Erie MetroParks district, Erie County commissioner and a member of the Perkins board of education.
