= Ted Gray (politician) =

American politician (1927–2024)

Theodore M. Gray
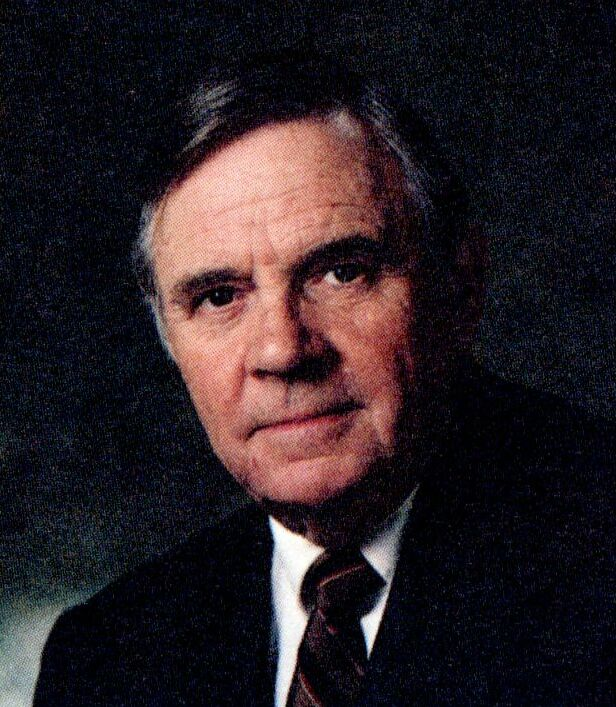

Member of the Ohio Senate from the 3rd district
- In office January 3, 1951 – February 24, 1994
- Preceded by: Inaugural holder
- Succeeded by: Bruce E. Johnson

Personal details
- Born: September 3, 1927 Springfield, Ohio, U.S.
- Died: March 6, 2024 (aged 96) Upper Arlington, Ohio, U.S.
- Party: Republican

Theodore Milton Gray (September 3, 1927 – March 6, 2024) was an American Republican politician who served in the Ohio Senate. Gray initially ran for the Senate in 1950, and won. He was sworn in on January 3, 1951 to his first term. He won reelection in 1954 and 1958. After winning a fourth consecutive term in 1962, Gray was elected majority leader of the Senate. After winning a fifth term in 1966, Gray rose to the title of President pro tempore, the second highest post in the Senate.

== Life and career ==
Theodore Milton Gray was born in Springfield, Ohio, on September 3, 1927.

By 1970, Gray's district had been redrawn to not include his home of Piqua, Ohio. As a result, he moved to Upper Arlington, Ohio, so he could stay in the Senate. He went on to win a sixth consecutive term. He again won reelection in 1974, 1978, and 1982. He ran unopposed in 1986 for election to a tenth consecutive term in the Senate.

In 1990, Gray was elected to what would be his last term, marking his fifth decade as a legislator. In his last term, Gray was appointed to serve as Senate Finance Chairman, one of the most powerful posts in the Senate. By 1992, speculations began to arise on whether Gray would serve the remainder of his term. Two years later on February 24, 1994, Gray resigned from his post. In all, he had spent over 43 years in the legislature, longer than any other person in Ohio history.

Following his retirement, Gray remained in Upper Arlington, Ohio, where he died on March 6, 2024, at the age of 96.
