= Bob Corbin =

American politician

Member of the Ohio House of Representatives from the 42nd district
- In office January 2, 1977 – December 31, 2000
- Preceded by: Fred Young
- Succeeded by: John White

Personal details
- Born: December 8, 1922 Appleton, Wisconsin, United States
- Died: February 22, 2013 (aged 90) Centerville, Ohio, United States
- Party: Republican

Robert L. Corbin (December 8, 1922 – February 22, 2013) was a member of the Ohio House of Representatives from 1977 to 2000. He was born in Appleton, Wisconsin in 1922 before moving to Ohio in 1923. His family settled in Dayton, Ohio in 1929. He served in the United States Army in Europe during World War II. After his military service he received his bachelor's degree from Otterbein College and worked in the food service business. He served on the Centerville, Ohio city council 2002–2006. His district consisted of a portion of Montgomery County, Ohio. He was succeeded by John White.

He died in 2013 at the age of 90.
