= Clifton Skeen =

American politician

Cliff Skeen

Member of the U.S. House of Representatives from Ohio's 69th district
- In office January 2, 1977 – December 31, 1992
- Preceded by: Ronald Weyandt
- Succeeded by: Betty Sutton

Member of the Ohio House of Representatives

Personal details
- Born: March 17, 1927 Richwood, West Virginia, US
- Died: January 30, 1993 (aged 65) Springfield Township, Summit County, Ohio, US
- Party: Democratic

Clifton Skeen (March 17, 1927 – January 30, 1993) was a member of the Ohio House of Representatives.
