= Michael A. Fox =

American politician (1948–2022)

Mike Fox

Member of the Ohio House of Representatives from the 59th district
- In office January 3, 1975 – October 14, 1997
- Preceded by: Tom Kindness
- Succeeded by: Greg Jolivette

Personal details
- Born: December 15, 1948 Hamilton, Ohio, U.S.
- Died: June 23, 2022 (aged 73)
- Party: Republican

Michael A. Fox (December 15, 1948 – June 23, 2022) was an American Republican politician from Fairfield Township, Butler County, Ohio.

Fox served as a representative in the Ohio State Legislature representing Hamilton and Fairfield, Ohio and surrounding areas for more than two decades. He then served on the Butler County commission from 1997 until 2007, then served as director the county's Children's Services through 2009.

Fox was honored by having the newly constructed Ohio State Route 129, a limited access highway connecting Hamilton and Liberty Township with Interstate 75, named for him. But in 2004, Fox's name was removed and the road was renamed Butler County Veterans Highway, after a rival politician from nearby Middletown sponsored a bill in the state legislature to change the name. A small section of the highway within the Hamilton city limits still bears Fox's name.

The Dayton Daily News of 24 June 2022, noted that Fox had directed large sums to support Miami University and had been influential in creating the Government Services Center in Hamilton. Until the mid 1980s all traffic on High Street, Hamilton was inconvenienced by the railroad crossing near the current underpass. Fox had directed $11 million for the Jack Kirsch underpass which has solved this traffic problem.

In 2009, Fox was indicted of federal charges which charge him with "abusing his political authority, defrauding the public out of hundreds of thousands of dollars and financially benefiting from county contracts from 2000 to 2008." The trial is pending.

According to a statement of facts filed with Fox’s plea agreement, Fox accepted approximately $460,000 in 2002 in what the government deems a bribe or kickback from Schuler. At the time, a company owned by Schuler, NORMAP, held a multimillion-dollar contract with Butler County to install a fiber optic communications network throughout the county.

Fox failed to disclose the $460,000 he received from Schuler to the Butler County Commission in an attempt to hide the improper financial relationship from the citizens of Butler County.

Fox admitted that he did not report the $460,000 on his 2002 federal income tax return. Schuler admitted that he did not report $360,000 in business income on his 2002 federal income tax return. The plea agreement does not resolve any possible civil liability that Fox or Schuler may have for taxes, interest, and penalties relating to their individual federal income tax relative to tax years 2002-2010.

In 2012, he was sentenced to 4 years in prison after having pleaded guilty to complicity to commit mail and wire fraud and filing a false tax return.
