= Casey Jones (politician) =

American basketball player and politician

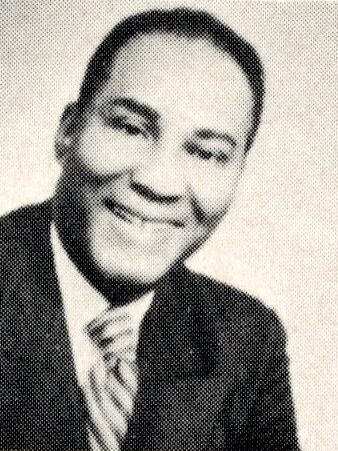

Member of the Ohio House of Representatives from the 49th district
- In office January 3, 1969 – December 31, 1994
- Preceded by: James Holzemer
- Succeeded by: Jack Ford

Personal details
- Born: June 14, 1915 Princeton, Kentucky, U.S.
- Died: April 2, 2002 (aged 86) Maumee, Ohio, U.S.
- Party: Democratic

Casey Jones
Personal information
- Listed height: 6 ft 2 in (1.88 m)
- Listed weight: 175 lb (79 kg)

Career information
- High school: Scott (Toledo, Ohio)
- College: Knoxville
- Position: Guard

Career history
- 1942–1943: Toledo Jim White Chevrolets

Casey Cleo Jones Sr. (June 14, 1915 – April 2, 2002) was an American professional basketball player, and later a member of the Ohio House of Representatives.

== Basketball career ==
Jones attended Scott High School in Toledo, Ohio before attending Knoxville College, where he played for the basketball team. After graduating, he played for the Ciralsky Meat Packers, a barnstorming steam, before signing a contract to play for the Toledo Jim White Chevrolets in 1942–43. The Toledo Jim White Chevrolets were in the National Basketball League (NBL), a forerunner to the modern National Basketball Association. Jones was one of the first 10 African-American players in the NBL's history. After his time in the NBL, Jones played for two more barnstorming teams, the New York Komedy Kings and the Harlem Globetrotters.
