= Bill Bowen =

American politician

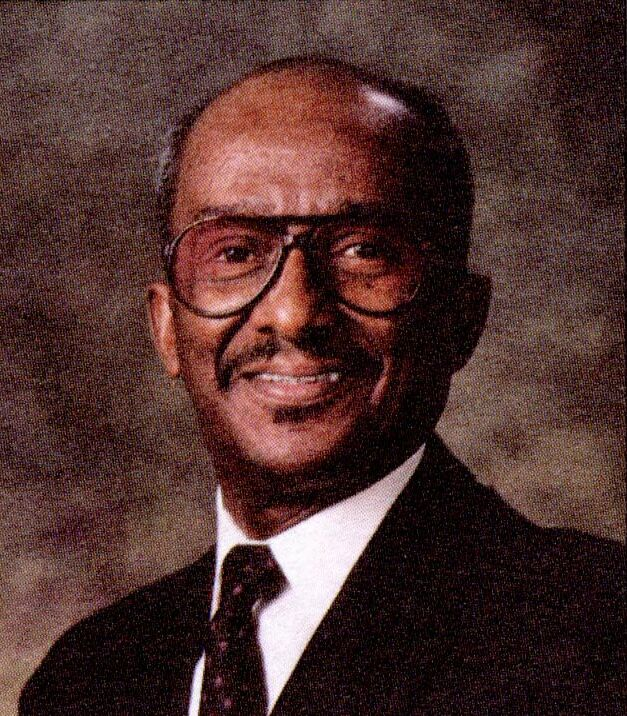

Member of the Ohio Senate from the 9th district
- In office February 11, 1970 – December 31, 1994
- Preceded by: Calvin C. Johnson
- Succeeded by: Janet C. Howard

Personal details
- Born: January 29, 1929 Cincinnati, Ohio
- Died: April 22, 1999 (aged 70) Columbus, Ohio
- Party: Democratic

William F. Bowen (January 29, 1929 – April 22, 1999) was a member of the Ohio Senate, serving from 1970–1994, and a member of the Ohio Civil Rights Commission Hall of Fame. He also served in the Ohio House of Representatives from 1967-1970.
