= Helen Rankin (Ohio politician) =

American politician (1936–2026)

L. Helen Rankin

Member of the Ohio House of Representatives from the 30th district
- In office September 14, 1978 – December 31, 1994
- Preceded by: James Rankin
- Succeeded by: Samuel T. Britton

Personal details
- Born: September 12, 1936
- Died: March 22, 2026 (aged 89)
- Party: Democratic

L. Helen Rankin (September 12, 1936 – March 22, 2026) was an American politician who was a member of the Ohio House of Representatives. She was the first African-American woman to serve in the Ohio House of Representatives.

In February 2013, Rankin was recognized by the Cincinnati City Council as a prominent local African American.

Rankin died on March 22, 2026, at the age of 89.
