= Barney Quilter =

American politician

J. Barney Quilter
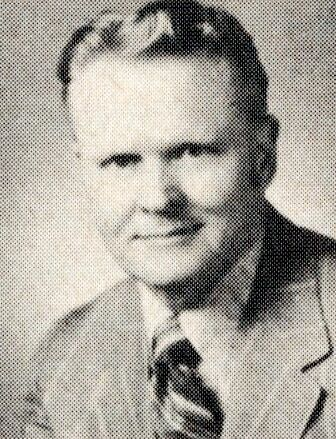

Member of the Ohio House of Representatives from the 50th district
- In office January 3, 1967 – December 31, 1994
- Preceded by: None (First)
- Succeeded by: John Garcia

Personal details
- Born: April 9, 1919 Toledo, Ohio
- Died: August 15, 2005 (aged 86) Oregon, Ohio
- Party: Democratic

James Barney Quilter (April 9, 1919 – August 15, 2005) was a member of the Ohio House of Representatives.

== Early life ==
Quilter was born in 1919 to James and Helen Marie Quilter and he grew up in East Toledo. He served in the 167th Combat Engineer Battalion in Europe during World War II. Quilter married Mary Carmella Sarno in 1944. Together they had two children.

== Career ==
In 1957 and 1965, Quilter ran unsuccessfully for the Toledo City Council. He worked in public relations at the Toledo Health and Retirees Center.

Quilter served in the Ohio House of Representatives for 20 years.

He died at the age of 86 in August 2005.
