= Rodney Hughes =

American politician

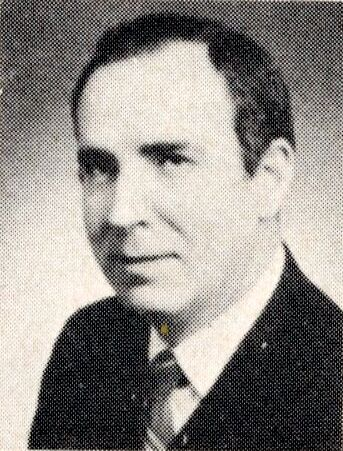

Member of the Ohio House of Representatives from the 83rd district
- In office January 3, 1967 – December 31, 1990
- Preceded by: None (First)
- Succeeded by: Ed Core

Personal details
- Born: August 2, 1925 Harrod, Ohio
- Died: November 19, 2005 (aged 80) Huntsville, Ohio
- Party: Republican

Rodney H. Hughes (August 2, 1925 – November 19, 2005) was a former member of the Ohio House of Representatives, serving the 78th District from 1967 to 1990. Born in Harrod, Ohio Hughes served as mayor of Bellefontaine from 1962 to 1967 prior to his election to the House of Representatives. Hughes was a Combat Staff Sergeant in the 358th Division of the 90th Infantry and received a Purple Heart and Bronze Star. He lived in Huntsville at the time of his death.
