= Francine Panehal =

American politician

Member of the Ohio House of Representatives from the 8th district
- In office January 3, 1975 – December 31, 1988
- Preceded by: Richard Celeste
- Succeeded by: Madeline Cain

Personal details
- Born: October 10, 1925 Cleveland, Ohio, U.S.
- Died: March 1, 2002 (aged 76) Cleveland, Ohio, U.S.
- Party: Democratic

Francine Mary Panehal (October 10, 1925 – March 1, 2002) was a member of the Ohio House of Representatives. She served as state house majority whip from 1979 until 1981.
