= Harry Meshel =

American politician

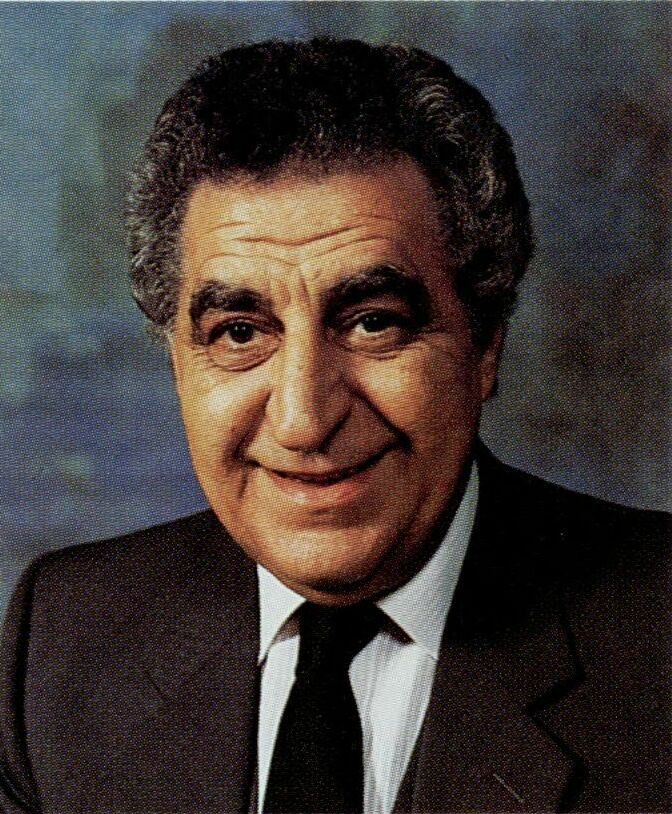

87th President of the Ohio Senate
- In office January 3, 1983 – December 31, 1984
- Preceded by: Paul Gillmor
- Succeeded by: Paul Gillmor

Member of the Ohio Senate from the 33rd district
- In office January 3, 1971 – April 13, 1993
- Preceded by: Charles J. Carney
- Succeeded by: Joseph Vukovich

Personal details
- Born: June 13, 1924 Youngstown, Ohio
- Died: September 4, 2017 (aged 93) Youngstown, Ohio
- Party: Democratic
- Education: Youngstown State University, Columbia University
- Profession: Politician

Harry Meshel (June 13, 1924 – September 4, 2017) was an American Democratic politician. He served as the president of the Ohio State Senate and chairman of the Ohio Democratic Party. Meshel is noted for his legislative efforts on behalf of disabled people, economic development, and solid and hazardous waste disposal.

== Early years ==
He was born in Youngstown, Ohio on June 13, 1924, to Greek-American parents, Rubena (Markakis) and Angelo Michelakis, whose surname was Americanized to Meshel. Harry graduated from Youngstown's East High School in 1941.

Meshel served in the Naval Construction Battalion, or SeeBees, during the Second World War from 1943 to 1946. He was awarded two Bronze Battle Stars for the battle of Leyte Gulf in 1944. He earned a bachelor's degree in business from Youngstown College in 1949. As an undergraduate, he was Student Council president and vice president of the senior class. Meshel received a master's degree in urban land economics from Columbia University in 1950. That same year he became a limited instructor at Youngstown College, while also working in investment, real estate, and insurance.

== Political career ==
In the 1960s, Meshel waged two unsuccessful campaigns for Mahoning County commissioner. He became an administrative assistant to Youngstown Mayor Anthony Flask in 1964, and served as urban renewal director in 1969. Meshel entered electoral politics in 1970, when he ran for a seat in the Ohio State Senate. In 1971, he was elected to the 33rd District of the Ohio Senate, and he was re-elected five times. Meshel became the Senate's majority whip and chairman of the Senate Finance Committee.

In 1980, Meshel ran for a seat in the United States House of Representatives but lost to Republican incumbent Lyle Williams. That same year, the Democrats lost the majority in the state Senate and Meshel replaced Oliver Ocasek, who had been president of the Ohio Senate, as the party's leader in the senate. Meshel served as minority leader from 1981 to 1982.

During his five terms in the Ohio Senate, Meshel was credited with helping to secure almost $150 million in capital improvements for Youngstown State University. In addition, he secured more than $160 million in grants and loans from the Ohio Department of Development for economic development projects. Meshel also worked to create the Northeastern Universities College of Medicine, the College of Osteopathic Medicine at Ohio University, the Wright State University School of Professional psychology, and other programs.

== Boxing ==
Meshel helped create the Ohio Boxing Commission, which eventually became the Ohio Athletic Commission.

From 1994, Meshel was also a supervisor for the International Boxing Council.

== Later years ==
In 1986, YSU named its new technology center Meshel Hall in his honor, as he helped secure funding for the project. In 1994, he received the YSU Distinguished Alumni Award.

In 1993, Meshel resigned from the Ohio Senate to become chairman of the Ohio Democratic Party, a position he held until 1995. In May 2007, Ohio Governor Ted Strickland named Meshel to a nine-year term as a trustee of Youngstown State University. He also worked as a lobbyist.

He was honored for spearheading the creation of the Youngstown Historical Center of Industry and Labor, which celebrated its 15th anniversary in September 2007.

Meshel has a street, "Meshel Way" named after him in Struthers, Ohio. Meshel also has a hall named after him at NEOMED. Meshel died on September 4, 2017.

== Personal life ==
Harry married the former Judy Lazich on July 25, 1948. They had two children, Barry and Melanie. He was a member of the Greek Orthodox Church.

== See also ==
- Ohio's 19th congressional district
