= Mike Stinziano =

American politician

Member of the Ohio House of Representatives from the 23rd district
- In office January 3, 1973 – December 31, 1994
- Preceded by: Doris Jones
- Succeeded by: Amy Salerno

Personal details
- Party: Democratic
- Children: Michael Stinziano

Michael Stinziano is an American politician who served as a member of the Ohio House of Representatives for the 23rd district from 1973 to 1994. His son, Michael Stinziano, is an attorney and politician.
