= Bob Netzley =

American politician (1922–2010)

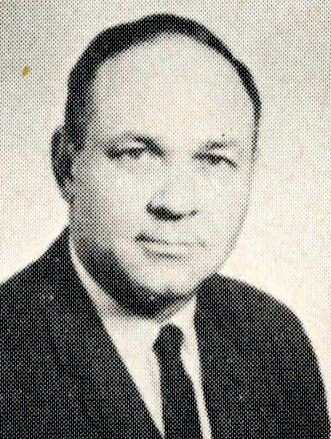

Member of the Ohio House of Representatives from the 43rd district
- In office January 3, 1967 – December 31, 2000
- Preceded by: District Created
- Succeeded by: Diana Fessler

Personal details
- Born: December 7, 1922 Laura, Ohio
- Died: July 28, 2010 (aged 87) Laura, Ohio
- Party: Republican

Robert Elmer "Bob" Netzley (December 7, 1922 – July 28, 2010) was Ohio's 2nd longest tenured legislator, serving in the Ohio House of Representatives for forty years, retiring in 2000 when he was term-limited. His district consisted of a portion of Miami County, Ohio. He was succeeded by Diana Fessler. Netzley was a graduate of Miami University where he was initiated as a member of Phi Kappa Tau.

The portion of State Route 571 within Miami County is designated "Robert E. Netzley Highway" in his honor.
