= Dale N. Van Vyven =

American politician

Dale Van Vyven

Member of the Ohio House of Representatives from the 32nd district
- In office September 14, 1978 – December 31, 2000
- Preceded by: Richard Finan
- Succeeded by: Wayne Coates

Personal details
- Born: April 20, 1925
- Died: April 12, 2010 (aged 74) Cincinnati, Ohio
- Party: Republican

Dale Nulsen Van Vyven (April 20, 1925 – April 12, 2010) was a member of the Ohio House of Representatives from 1978 to 2000. His district consisted of a portion of Hamilton County, Ohio. He was succeeded by Wayne Coates. Van Vyven died on April 12, 2010, at the age of 74 of a respiratory illness.
