= Ike Thompson =

American politician

- Ike Thompson in 1981

Member of the Ohio House of Representatives from the 14th district
- In office January 3, 1971-December 31, 1990
- Preceded by: Tom Hill
- Succeeded by: C.J. Prentiss

Personal details
- Born: Isaiah Thompson; November 8, 1915 Birmingham, Alabama
- Died: June 25, 1995 (aged 79) Cleveland, Ohio
- Party: Democratic
- Spouse: Lodeamer Pettiford
- Children: 1

Isaiah "Ike" Thompson (November 8, 1915 – June 25, 1995) was a former member of the Ohio House of Representatives, serving the 14th district (portions of Glenville, Euclid, Bratenahl, and East Cleveland) from 1971–1990. Thompson graduated from Central High School and attended Cleveland State University. Thompson served as a vice-chairman of the Cuyahoga County Democratic Party. Thompson was a member of the Knights of Columbus and a member of St. Aloysious Roman Catholic Church. With his wife Lodeamer, he had one daughter, Arwilda Storey.
