= Richard Finan =

American politician

Richard H. Finan
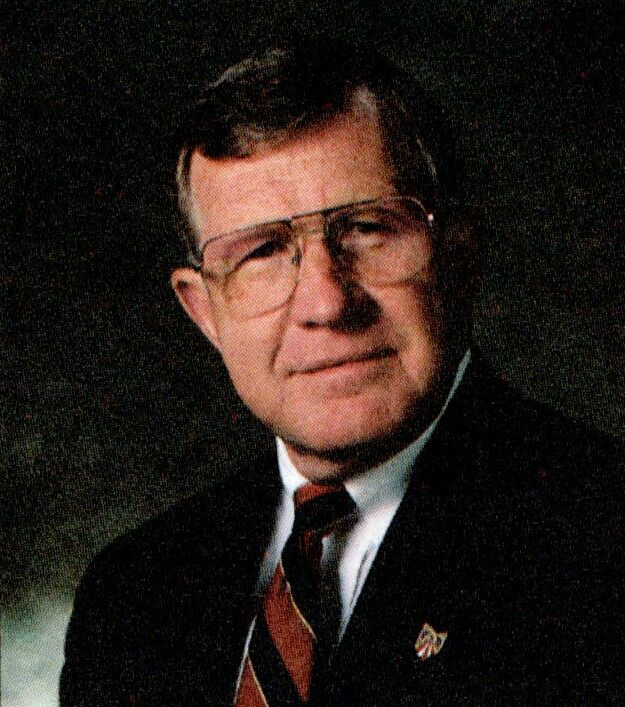

90th President of the Ohio Senate
- In office January 3, 1997 – December 31, 2002
- Preceded by: Stanley Aronoff
- Succeeded by: Doug White

President of the National Conference of State Legislatures
- In office 1997–1998
- Preceded by: Michael Box
- Succeeded by: Dan Blue

Member of the Ohio Senate from the 7th district
- In office September 14, 1978 – December 31, 2002
- Preceded by: Michael Maloney
- Succeeded by: Bob Schuler

Member of the Ohio House of Representatives from the 19th district
- In office January 3, 1973 – September 16, 1978
- Preceded by: Dale Schmidt
- Succeeded by: Dale N. Van Vyven

Personal details
- Born: August 16, 1934 (age 91) Cincinnati, Ohio, U.S.
- Party: Republican

Richard H. Finan (born August 16, 1934) is an American Republican politician who formerly served in the Ohio General Assembly. An attorney, Finan was initially elected to the Ohio House of Representatives in 1972, representing a suburban Cincinnati district. He was reelected in 1974 and 1976.

In 1978, Senator Michael Maloney left the Ohio Senate to become Hamilton County Administrator. As a result, his Senate seat became open, and Finan was appointed by Senate Republicans to succeed him. He ran for election to a full term that November, and won. He was reelected in 1982, and went on to serve as Chairman of the Senate Ways and Means Committee. He was reelected again in 1986. In 1990, Finan was thought to be aiming for a run for Ohio Governor. However, he remained in the Senate and won a fifth term in the fall election of that year. By this time, he was serving as President pro tempore of the Senate.

When Senate President Stanley Aronoff decided not to seek reelection in 1996, Finan was nominated to replace him. With term limits now in effect in Ohio, Finan was only eligible for one final term, and won in 1998. After twenty four years in office, Finan left the Senate in 2002.

Since leaving the Senate, Finan has returned to private practice and lobbying.

Finan was elected Mayor of his hometown, the Village of Evendale, in 2015 and again in 2019
