= Barbara C. Pringle =

American politician (1939–2024)

Barbara Pringle

Member of the Ohio House of Representatives from the 13th district
- In office November 18, 1982 – December 31, 2000
- Preceded by: Benny Bonanno
- Succeeded by: Mary Rose Oakar

Personal details
- Born: April 4, 1939 New York City, New York, U.S.
- Died: September 16, 2024 (aged 85) Cleveland, Ohio, U.S.
- Party: Democratic

Barbara Carroll Pringle (née Terlesky, April 4, 1939 – September 16, 2024) was an American politician who was a member of the Ohio House of Representatives. She initially won a term in 1982, and went on to serve until 2000, when she was term limited. She is best remembered for being a key player in the DeRolph education funding debates in the 1990s. Pringle died in Cleveland on September 16, 2024, at the age of 85.
