= 117th Ohio General Assembly =

The One Hundred Seventeenth Ohio General Assembly was the legislative body of the state of Ohio in 1987 and 1988. In this General Assembly, the Ohio Senate was controlled by the Republican Party and the Ohio House of Representatives was controlled by the Democratic Party. In the Senate, there were 18 Republicans and 15 Democrats. In the House, there were 61 Democrats and 38 Republicans.

== Major events ==
=== Vacancies ===
- January 2, 1987: Senator Buz Lukens (R-4th) resigns to take a seat in the United States House of Representatives.
- November 23, 1987: Representative Vernon Cook (D-43rd) dies.

=== Appointments ===
- January 4, 1987: Barry Levey is appointed to the 4th Senatorial District due to the resignation of Buz Lukens.
- January 6, 1988: Wayne Jones is appointed to the 43rd House District following the death of Vernon Cook.

== Senate ==
=== Leadership ===
==== Majority leadership ====
- President of the Senate: Paul Gillmor
- President pro tempore of the Senate: Stanley Aronoff
- Assistant pro tempore: Richard Finan
- Whip: David Hobson

==== Minority leadership ====
- Leader: Harry Meshel
- Assistant Leader: Neal Zimmers
- Whip: Eugene Branstool
- Assistant Whip: Michael White

=== Members of the 117th Ohio Senate ===
District	Senator	Party	First elected
1	M. Ben Gaeth	Republican	1974
2	Paul Gillmor	Republican	1967
3	Ted Gray	Republican	1967
4	Barry Levey	Republican	1987 (Appt.)
5	Neal Zimmers	Democratic	1974
6	Chuck Horn	Republican	1984
7	Richard Finan	Republican	1978 (Appt.)
8	Stanley Aronoff	Republican	1967
9	Bill Bowen	Democratic	1970 (Appt.)
10	David Hobson	Republican	1982 (Appt.)
11	Linda J. Furney	Democratic	1986
12	Robert R. Cupp	Republican	1984
13	Alan Zaleski	Democrat	1982
14	Cooper Snyder	Republican	1979 (Appt.)
15	Richard Pfeiffer	Democratic	1982
16	Eugene J. Watts	Republican	1984
17	Jan Michael Long	Democratic	1986
18	Robert Boggs	Democratic	1982
19	Richard Schafrath	Republican	1986
20	Bob Ney	Republican	1984 (Appt.)
21	Michael R. White	Democratic	1984 (Appt.)
22	Grace L. Drake	Republican	1984 (Appt.)
23	Charles L. Butts	Democratic	1974
24	Gary C. Suhadolnik	Republican	1980
25	Lee Fisher	Democratic	1982
26	Paul Pfeifer	Republican	1976
27	Roy Ray	Republican	1986
28	Bob Nettle	Democratic	1986
29	Scott Oelslager	Republican	1985 (Appt.)
30	Rob Burch	Democratic	1984
31	Eugene Branstool	Democrat	1982
32	Tom Carney	Democratic	1972
33	Harry Meshel	Democratic	1970

== House of Representatives ==
=== Leadership ===
==== Majority leadership ====
- Speaker of the House: Vern Riffe
- President pro tempore of the House: Barney Quilter
- Floor Leader: Bill Mallory
- Assistant Majority Floor Leader: Vernon Cook
- Majority Whip: Patrick Sweeney
- Assistant Majority Whip: Judy Sheerer

==== Minority leadership ====
- Leader: Corwin Nixon
- Assistant Leader: Dave Johnson
- Whip: Jo Ann Davidson
- Assistant Whip: Lou Blessing

=== Members of the 117th Ohio House of Representatives ===
District	Representative	Party	First elected
1	Bill Thompson	Republican	1986
2	Ross Boggs Jr	Democratic	1982
3	John D. Shivers Jr.	Democratic	1982
4	William G. Batchelder	Republican	1968
5	Randy Gardner	Republican	1985 (Appt.)
6	Jim Petro	Republican	1986
7	Rocco Colonna	Democratic	1974
8	Francine Panehal	Democratic	1974
9	Patrick Sweeney	Democratic	1967
10	Ron Mottl	Democratic	1986
11	Barbara C. Pringle	Democratic	1982 (Appt.)
12	Troy Lee James	Democratic	1967
13	Robert Jaskulski	Democratic	1986
14	Ike Thompson	Democratic	1970
15	Jane Campbell	Democratic	1984
16	Vermel Whalen	Democratic	1986 (Appt.)
17	Leroy Peterson	Democratic	1982
18	Judy Sheerer	Democratic	1982
19	Ron Suster	Democratic	1980
20	Thomas Pottenger	Republican	1976
21	Jerome F. Luebbers	Democratic	1978
22	Lou Blessing	Republican	1982
23	William L. Mallory Sr.	Democratic	1966
24	Terry Tranter	Democratic	1976 (Appt.)
25	Helen Rankin	Democratic	1978 (Appt.)
26	Jacquelin K. O'Brien	Republican	1986
27	Dale Van Vyven	Republican	1978 (Appt.)
28	Ed Thomas Jr.	Republican	
29	Ray Miller	Democratic	1982
30	Mike Stinziano	Democratic	1972
31	Otto Beatty Jr.	Democratic	1980 (Appt.)
32	Dean Conley	Democratic	1978
33	Don Gilmore	Republican	1978
34	Jo Ann Davidson	Republican	1980
35	Bill Schuck	Republican	
36	C.J. McLin	Democratic	1966
37	Tom Roberts	Democratic	1986 (Appt.)
38	Bob Corbin	Republican	1976
39	Bob Hickey	Democratic	1982
40	Russ Guerra	Republican	
41	Tom Seese	Democratic	1986 (Appt.)
42	Vernon Sykes	Democratic	1983 (Appt.)
43	Wayne Jones	Democratic	1988 (Appt.)
44	Tom Watkins	Republican	1984
45	Casey Jones	Democratic	1968
46	Don Czarcinski	Democratic	1983 (Appt.)
47	Barney Quilter	Democratic	1966
48	Arlene Singer	Democratic	1986
49	Chuck Red Ash	Republican	1978
50	William J. Healy	Democratic	1974
51	David Johnson	Republican	1976
52	Joseph Vukovich	Democratic	1976
53	Bob Hagan	Democratic	1986
54	John Bara	Democratic	1982
55	Joseph Koziura	Democratic	1984
56	Michael A. Fox	Republican	1974
57	John Boehner	Republican	1984
58	June Lucas	Democratic	1986
59	Michael G. Verich	Democratic	1982
60	Dan Troy	Democratic	1982
61	Robert E. Hagan	Democratic	
62	David Hartley	Democratic	
63	Paul Jones	Democratic	1982
64	Frank Sawyer	Democratic	1982
65	Bob Doyle	Republican	1982
66	Sam Bateman Jr.	Republican	
67	Marc Guthrie	Democratic	1982
68	Bob Netzley	Republican	1967
69	Cliff Skeen	Democratic	1976
70	Fred Deering	Democratic	1972
71	Ron Gerberry	Democratic	1974
72	Marie Tansey	Republican	1976
73	James Buchy	Republican	
74	Bob Clark	Republican	1982
75	Joe Haines	Republican	1980
76	Eugene Byers	Republican	1986
77	Harry Mallott	Democratic	1972
78	Steve Williams	Republican	1980
79	Larry Manahan	Republican	1978
80	Lynn Wachtmann	Republican	1984
81	Jim Davis	Republican	1984
82	Jon Stozich	Republican	
83	Rodney Hughes	Republican	1967
84	Corwin Nixon	Republican	1967
85	Dwight Wise	Democratic	1982
86	Larry Adams	Republican	1986
87	Joan Lawrence	Republican	1982
88	Mike Shoemaker	Democratic	1982
89	Vern Riffe	Democratic	1967
90	Rick Rench	Republican	
91	Paul Mechling	Democratic	
92	Mark Malone	Democratic	1984
93	Ron Amstutz	Republican	1980
94	Jolynn Boster	Democratic	1982
95	Joe Secrest	Democratic	1982
96	Tom Johnson	Democratic	1976
97	William Hinig	Democratic	1967
98	Jerry W. Krupinski	Democratic	1986
99	Jack Cera	Democratic	1982

Appt.- Member was appointed to current House Seat

== See also ==
- Ohio House of Representatives membership, 126th General Assembly
- Ohio House of Representatives membership, 125th General Assembly
- List of Ohio state legislatures
