= 120th Ohio General Assembly =

The One Hundred Twentieth Ohio General Assembly was the legislative body of the state of Ohio in 1993 and 1994. In this General Assembly, the Ohio Senate was controlled by the Republicans and the Ohio House of Representatives was controlled by the Democrats. In the Senate, there were 19 Republicans and 14 Democrats. In the House, there were 52 Democrats and 47 Republicans. It was the first General Assembly to use redistricted legislative districts from the 1990 United States census.

== Major events ==
=== Vacancies ===
- April 13, 1993: Senator Harry Meshel (D-33rd) resigns.
- July 1, 1993: Representative Ray Miller (D-22nd) resigns.
- December 31, 1993: Senator Steven Williams (R-31st) resigns.
- February 2, 1994: Senator Ted Gray (R-3rd) resigns.

=== Appointments ===
- April 21, 1993: Joseph Vukovich is appointed to the 33rd Senatorial District due to the resignation of Harry Meshel
- July 1, 1993: Charleta Tavares is appointed to the 22nd House District due to the resignation of Ray Miller.
- January 4, 1994: Nancy Dix is appointed to the 31st Senatorial District due to the resignation of Steven Williams.
- March 1, 1994: Bruce E. Johnson is appointed to the 3rd Senatorial District due to the resignation of Ted Gray.

== Senate ==
=== Leadership ===
==== Majority leadership ====
- President of the Senate: Stanley Aronoff
- President pro tempore of the Senate: Richard Finan
- Assistant pro tempore: Eugene J. Watts
- Whip: Roy Ray

==== Minority leadership ====
- Leader: Robert Boggs
- Assistant Leader: Alan Zaleski
- Whip: Ben Espy
- Assistant Whip: Bob Nettle

=== Members of the 120th Ohio Senate ===
District	Senator	Party	First elected
1	M. Ben Gaeth	Republican	1974
2	Betty Montgomery	Republican	1988
3	Bruce E. Johnson	Republican	1994 (Appt.)
4	Barry Levey	Republican	1987 (Appt.)
5	Neal Zimmers	Democratic	1974
6	Chuck Horn	Republican	1984
7	Richard Finan	Republican	1978 (Appt.)
8	Stanley Aronoff	Republican	1967
9	Bill Bowen	Democratic	1970 (Appt.)
10	Merle G. Kearns	Republican	1991 (Appt.)
11	Linda J. Furney	Democratic	1986
12	Robert R. Cupp	Republican	1984
13	Alan Zaleski	Democrat	1982
14	Cooper Snyder	Republican	1979 (Appt.)
15	Ben Espy	Democratic	1992 (Appt.)
16	Eugene J. Watts	Republican	1984
17	Jan Michael Long	Democratic	1986
18	Robert Boggs	Democratic	1982
19	Richard Schafrath	Republican	1986
20	Bob Ney	Republican	1984 (Appt.)
21	Jeffrey Johnson	Democratic	1990 (Appt.)
22	Grace L. Drake	Republican	1984 (Appt.)
23	Anthony Sinagra	Democratic	1990
24	Gary C. Suhadolnik	Republican	1980
25	Judy Sheerer	Democratic	1992 (Appt.)
26	Karen Gillmor	Republican	1992
27	Roy Ray	Republican	1986
28	Bob Nettle	Democratic	1986
29	Scott Oelslager	Republican	1985 (Appt.)
30	Rob Burch	Democratic	1984
31	Nancy Dix	Republican	1994 (Appt.)
32	Anthony Latell Jr.	Democratic	1992
33	Joseph Vukovich	Democratic	1993 (Appt.)

== House of Representatives ==
=== Leadership ===
==== Majority leadership ====
- Speaker of the House: Vern Riffe
- President pro tempore of the House: Barney Quilter
- Floor Leader: Bill Mallory
- Assistant Majority Floor Leader: Vernon Sykes
- Majority Whip: Jane Campbell
- Assistant Majority Whip: Marc Guthrie

==== Minority leadership ====
- Leader: Jo Ann Davidson
- Assistant Leader: William G. Batchelder
- Whip: Randy Gardner
- Assistant Whip: Tom Johnson

=== Members of the 120th Ohio House of Representatives ===
District	Representative	Party	First elected
1	Bill Thompson	Republican	1986
2	George E. Terwilleger	Republican	1992
3	Sean D. Logan	Democratic	1990 (Appt.)
4	Randy Gardner	Republican	1985 (Appt.)
5	Ross Boggs	Democratic	1982
6	Jon D. Myers	Republican	1990
7	Ron Amstutz	Republican	1980
8	C.J. Prentiss	Democratic	1990
9	Barbara Boyd	Democratic	1992
10	Troy Lee James	Democratic	1967
11	Jane Campbell	Democratic	1984
12	Vermel Whalen	Democratic	1986 (Appt.)
13	Barbara C. Pringle	Democratic	1982 (Appt.)
14	Ron Suster	Democratic	1980
15	Mike Wise	Republican	1992
16	Ed Kasputis	Republican	1990
17	Madeline Cain	Democratic	1988
18	Rocco Colonna	Democratic	1974
19	Patrick Sweeney	Democratic	1967
20	Ron Mottl	Democratic	1986
21	Otto Beatty Jr.	Democratic	1980 (Appt.)
22	Charleta Tavares	Democratic	1993 (Appt.)
23	Mike Stinziano	Democratic	1972
24	Jo Ann Davidson	Republican	1980
25	Jim Mason	Republican	1992
26	Patrick Tiberi	Republican	1992
27	E. J. Thomas	Republican	
28	Priscilla D. Mead	Republican	1992
29	Bill Schuck	Republican	
30	Helen Rankin	Democratic	1978 (Appt.)
31	William L. Mallory Sr.	Democratic	1966
32	Dale N. Van Vyven	Republican	1978 (Appt.)
33	Jerome F. Luebbers	Democratic	1978
34	Cheryl Winkler	Republican	1990 (Appt.)
35	Lou Blessing	Republican	1982
36	Bob Schuler	Republican	1992
37	Jacquelin K. O'Brien	Republican	1986
38	Rhine McLin	Democratic	1989 (Appt.)
39	Tom Roberts	Democratic	1986 (Appt.)
40	Jeff Jacobson	Republican	1992 (Appt.)
41	Don Mottley	Republican	1992
42	Bob Corbin	Republican	1976
43	Bob Netzley	Republican	1967
44	Vernon Sykes	Democratic	1983 (Appt.)
45	Karen Doty	Democratic	1992
46	Wayne Jones	Democratic	1988 (Appt.)
47	Betty Sutton	Democratic	1992
48	Tom Seese	Democratic	1986 (Appt.)
49	Casey Jones	Democratic	1968
50	Barney Quilter	Democratic	1966
51	Tim Greenwood	Republican	1988
52	Sally Perz	Republican	1992
53	Darrell Opfer	Democratic	1992
54	William J. Healy	Democratic	1974
55	Dave Johnson	Republican	1978
56	Johnnie Maier Jr.	Democratic	1990
57	Francis Carr	Democratic	1992
58	Scott Nein	Republican	1990
59	Michael A. Fox	Republican	1974
60	Gene Krebs	Republican	
61	Joseph Koziura	Democratic	1984
62	John Bender	Democratic	1992
63	Katherine Walsh	Democratic	1988
64	Bob Hagan	Democratic	1986
65	Ron Gerberry	Democratic	1974
66	Michael G. Verich	Democratic	1982
67	June Lucas	Democratic	1986
68	Diane Grendell	Republican	1992
69	Ray Sines	Republican	
70	Dan Troy	Democratic	1982
71	Sam Bateman	Republican	1984
72	Rose Vesper	Republican	1992
73	David Hartley	Democratic	1972
74	Joe Haines	Republican	1980
75	Paul Jones	Democratic	1982
76	Marilyn Reid	Republican	1992
77	Marc Guthrie	Democratic	1982
78	Mary Abel	Democratic	1989 (Appt.)
79	Frank Sawyer	Democratic	1982
80	Joan Lawrence	Republican	1982
81	William G. Batchelder	Republican	1968
82	Richard Hodges	Republican	1992
83	Lynn Wachtmann	Republican	1984
84	Jim Buchy	Republican	1982
85	Jim Davis	Republican	1984
86	Chuck Brading	Republican	
87	Ed Core	Republican	1990
88	Doug White	Republican	1990
89	Dwight Wise	Democratic	1982
90	Randy Weston	Democratic	1990
91	Mike Shoemaker	Democratic	1982
92	Vern Riffe	Democratic	1967
93	Eugene Byers	Republican	1986
94	Mark Malone	Democratic	1984
95	Joy Padgett	Republican	1992
96	Tom Johnson	Republican	1976
97	Greg DiDonato	Republican	1990
98	Jerry W. Krupinski	Democratic	1986
99	Jack Cera	Democratic	1982

Appt.- Member was appointed to current House Seat

== See also ==
- Ohio House of Representatives membership, 126th General Assembly
- Ohio House of Representatives membership, 125th General Assembly
- List of Ohio state legislatures
