= 115th Ohio General Assembly =

Overview
- Jurisdiction: Ohio, United States

Ohio Senate
- President: Harry Meshel (D)

Ohio House of Representatives
- Speaker: Vern Riffe (D)

The One Hundred Fifteenth Ohio General Assembly was the legislative body of the state of Ohio in 1983 and 1984. In this General Assembly, both the Ohio Senate and the Ohio House of Representatives were controlled by the Democratic Party. In the Senate, there were 17 Democrats and 16 Republicans. In the House, there were 62 Democrats and 37 Republicans. It was the first General Assembly to use redistricted legislative districts from the 1980 United States census.

== Major events ==
=== Vacancies ===
December 2, 1983: Senator Sam Speck (R-20th) resigns. March 11, 1983: Representative Pete Crossland (D-42nd) resigns. July 19, 1983: Representative Arthur Wilkowski (D-46th) resigns. March 6, 1984: Senator Tom Fries (D-6th) resigns May 17, 1984: Senator Morris Jackson (D-21st) resigns. May 20, 1984: Senator Ben Skall (R-22nd) resigns. May 22, 1984: Representative Jim Petro (R-6th) resigns.

=== Appointments ===
March 16, 1983: Vernon Sykes is appointed to the 42nd House District. November 30, 1983: Don Czarcinski is appointed to the 46th House District. January 10, 1984: Bob Ney is appointed to the 20th Senatorial District. March 6, 1984: Tom Talbott is appointed to the 6th Senatorial District. May 17, 1984: Michael R. White is appointed to the 21st Senatorial District. May 20, 1984: Grace L. Drake is appointed to the 22nd Senatorial District. May 23, 1984: Jeff Jacobs is appointed to the 6th House District.

== Senate ==
=== Leadership ===
==== Majority leadership ====
- President of the Senate: Harry Meshel
- President pro tempore of the Senate: Neal Zimmers
- Assistant pro tempore: Charles Butts
- Whip: Marigene Valiquette

==== Minority leadership ====
- Leader Minority of Ohio State Senate: Paul Gillmor
- Vice-Leader Minority of Ohio State Senate: Stanley Aronoff
- Assistant Vice-Leader Minority of Ohio State Senate: Sam Speck
- Second Assistant Vice-Leader Minority of Ohio State Senate: Paul Pfeifer

=== Members of the 115th Ohio Senate ===
District	Senator	Party	First elected
1	M. Ben Gaeth	Republican	1974
2	Paul Gillmor	Republican	1967
3	Ted Gray	Republican	1967
4	Buz Lukens	Republican	1971 (Appt.)
5	Neal Zimmers	Democratic	1974
6	Tom Talbott	Democratic	1984 (Appt.)
7	Richard Finan	Republican	1978 (Appt.)
8	Stanley Aronoff	Republican	1967
9	Bill Bowen	Democratic	1970 (Appt.)
10	David Hobson	Republican	1982 (Appt.)
11	Marigene Valiquette	Democratic	1969 (Appt.)
12	Steve Maurer	Democratic	1980
13	Alan Zaleski	Democratic	1982
14	Cooper Snyder	Republican	1979 (Appt.)
15	Richard Pfeiffer	Democratic	1982
16	Michael Schwarzwalder	Democratic	1976
17	Oakley C. Collins	Republican	1974
18	Robert Boggs	Democratic	1982
19	Lowell Steinbrenner	Republican	1982
20	Bob Ney	Republican	1984 (Appt.)
21	Michael R. White	Democratic	1984 (Appt.)
22	Grace L. Drake	Republican	1984 (Appt.)
23	Charles L. Butts	Democratic	1974
24	Gary C. Suhadolnik	Republican	1980
25	Lee Fisher	Democratic	1982
26	Paul Pfeifer	Republican	1976
27	Oliver Ocasek	Democratic	1967
28	Marcus Roberto	Democratic	1982
29	Tom Walsh	Republican	1978
30	Bill Ress	Republican	1980
31	Eugene Branstool	Democratic	1982
32	Tom Carney	Democratic	1972
33	Harry Meshel	Democratic	1970

== House of Representatives ==
=== Leadership ===
==== Majority leadership ====
- Speaker of the House: Vern Riffe
- President pro tempore of the Senate: Barney Quilter
- Floor Leader: Bill Mallory
- Assistant Majority Floor Leader: Vernon Cook
- Majority Whip: Mary Boyle

==== Minority leadership ====
- Leader: Corwin Nixon
- Assistant Leader: Waldo Rose
- Whip: Dave Johnson

=== Members of the 115th Ohio House of Representatives ===
District	Representative	Party	First elected
1	Waldo Rose	Republican	1972
2	Ross Boggs	Democratic	1982
3	John D. Shivers Jr.	Democratic	1982
4	William G. Batchelder	Republican	1968
5	Robert Brown	Republican	1978
6	Jeff Jacobs	Republican	1984 (Appt.)
7	Rocco Colonna	Democratic	1974
8	Francine Panehal	Democratic	1974
9	Patrick Sweeney	Democratic	1967
10	June Kreuzer	Democratic	1982
11	Barbara C. Pringle	Democratic	1982 (Appt.)
12	Troy Lee James	Democratic	1967
13	Frank Mahnic Jr.	Democratic	1978
14	Ike Thompson	Democratic	1970
15	Mary Boyle	Democratic	1978
16	John Thompson	Democratic	1970
17	Leroy Peterson	Democratic	1982
18	Judy Sheerer	Democratic	1982
19	Ron Suster	Democratic	1980
20	Thomas Pottenger	Republican	1976
21	Jerome F. Luebbers	Democratic	1978
22	Lou Blessing	Republican	1982
23	William L. Mallory Sr.	Democratic	1966
24	Terry Tranter	Democratic	1976 (Appt.)
25	Helen Rankin	Democratic	1978 (Appt.)
26	John O'Brien	Republican	1980
27	Dale Van Vyven	Republican	1978 (Appt.)
28	David J. Leland	Democratic	
29	Ray Miller	Democratic	1982
30	Mike Stinziano	Democratic	1972
31	Otto Beatty Jr.	Democratic	1980 (Appt.)
32	Dean Conley	Democratic	1978
33	Don Gilmore	Republican	1978
34	Jo Ann Davidson	Republican	1980
35	Dana Deshler	Republican	
36	C.J. McLin	Democratic	1966
37	Ed Orlett	Democratic	1972
38	Bob Corbin	Republican	1976
39	Bob Hickey	Democratic	1982
40	Russell E. Guerra	Republican	
41	Bob Nettle	Democratic	1976
42	Vernon Sykes	Democratic	1983 (Appt.)
43	Vernon Cook	Democratic	1972
44	Thomas C. Sawyer	Democratic	1976
45	Casey Jones	Democratic	1968
46	Don Czarcinski	Democratic	1983 (Appt.)
47	Barney Quilter	Democratic	1966
48	John Galbraith	Republican	1966
49	Chuck Red Ash	Republican	1978
50	William J. Healy	Democratic	1974
51	David Johnson	Republican	1976
52	Joseph Vukovich	Democratic	1976
53	Tom Gilmartin	Democratic	1972
54	John Bara	Democratic	1982
55	Michael Camera	Democratic	1982
56	Michael A. Fox	Republican	1974
57	Bill Donham	Republican	1972
58	Joe Williams	Republican	1980
59	Michael G. Verich	Democratic	1982
60	Dan Troy	Democratic	1982
61	Bob Hagan Sr.	Democratic	
62	David Hartley	Democratic	
63	Paul Jones	Democratic	1982
64	Frank Sawyer	Democratic	1982
65	Bob Doyle	Republican	1982
66	Sue Fisher	Republican	
67	Marc Guthrie	Democratic	1982
68	Bob Netzley	Republican	1967
69	Cliff Skeen	Democratic	1976
70	Fred Deering	Democratic	1972
71	Ron Gerberry	Democratic	1974
72	Marie Tansey	Republican	1976
73	Jim Buchy	Republican	
74	Bob Clark	Republican	1982
75	Joe Haines	Republican	1980
76	Harry Turner	Republican	1972
77	Harry Mallott	Democratic	1972
78	Steve Williams	Republican	1980
79	Larry Manahan	Republican	1978
80	Chuck Earl	Republican	1982
81	Dale Locker	Democratic	1972
82	John Stozich	Republican	
83	Rodney Hughes	Republican	1967
84	Corwin Nixon	Republican	1967
85	Dwight Wise	Democratic	1982
86	Walter McClaskey	Republican	1972
87	Joan Lawrence	Republican	1982
88	Mike Shoemaker	Democratic	1982
89	Vern Riffe	Democratic	1967
90	Richard Rench	Republican	
91	Paul Mechling	Democratic	
92	Ron James	Democratic	1974
93	Ron Amstutz	Republican	1980
94	Jolynn Boster	Democratic	1982
95	Joe Secrest	Democratic	1982
96	Tom Johnson	Democratic	1976
97	William Hinig	Democratic	1967
98	Arthur Bowers	Democratic	1968
99	Jack Cera	Democratic	1982

Appt.- Member was appointed to current House Seat

== See also ==
- Ohio House of Representatives membership, 126th General Assembly
- Ohio House of Representatives membership, 125th General Assembly
- List of Ohio state legislatures
