= 121st Ohio General Assembly =

The One Hundred Twenty-first Ohio General Assembly was the legislative body of the state of Ohio in 1995 and 1996. In this General Assembly, both the Ohio Senate and the Ohio House of Representatives were controlled by the Republican Party. In the Senate, there were 20 Republicans and 13 Democrats. In the House, there were 56 Republicans and 43 Democrats.

== Major events ==
=== Vacancies ===
- January 3, 1995: Senator Robert Ney (R-20th) resigns to take a seat in the United States House of Representatives.
- January 4, 1995: Representative Tim Greenwood (R-51st) resigns to take a seat in the Ohio Senate.
- January 3, 1995: Senator Betty Montgomery (R-2nd) resigns to become Ohio Attorney General.
- March 31, 1995: Senator Bob Nettle (D-28th) resigns.
- June 30, 1995: Senator Barry Levey (R-4th) resigns.
- July 11, 1995: Representative Scott Nein (R-58th) resigns to take a seat in the Ohio Senate.
- October 5, 1995: Senator Tim Greenwood (R-2nd) resigns.
- October 5, 1995: Representative Ron Suster (D-14th) resigns to take a seat on the Cuyahoga County Court of Common Pleas.
- December 31, 1995: Representative Madeline Cain (D-17th) resigns.
- December 31, 1995: Representative Joseph Koziura (D-61st) resigns to become Mayor of Lorain, Ohio.
- March 31, 1996: Senator Cooper Snyder (R-14th) resigns.
- April 15, 1996: Representative Doug White (R-88th) resigns to take a seat in the Ohio Senate.

=== Appointments ===
- January 3, 1995: James E. Carnes is appointed to the 20th Senatorial District due to the resignation of Bob Ney.
- January 3, 1995: Tim Greenwood is appointed to the 2nd Senatorial District due to the resignation of Betty Montgomery.
- January 4, 1995: Lynn Olman is appointed to the 51st House District due to the resignation of Tim Greenwood.
- March 29, 1995: Leigh Herington is appointed to the 28th Senatorial District due to the resignation of Bob Nettle.
- July 11, 1995: Scott Nein is appointed to the 4th Senatorial District due to the resignation of Barry Levey.
- October 5, 1995: Steve Yarbrough is appointed to the 2nd Senatorial District due to the resignation of Tim Greenwood.
- October 5, 1995: Gary Cates is appointed to the 58th House District due to the resignation of Scott Nein.
- October 5, 1995: Ed Jerse is appointed to the 14th House District due to the resignation of Ron Suster.
- January 6, 1996: Dan Brady is appointed to the 17th House District due to the resignation of Madeline Cain.
- January 9, 1996: Dan Metelsky is appointed to the 61st House District due to the resignation of Joseph Koziura
- April 16, 1996: Doug White is appointed to the 14th Senatorial District due to the resignation of Cooper Snyder.
- April 16, 1996: Dennis Stapleton is appointed to the 88th House District due to the resignation of Doug White.

== Senate ==
=== Leadership ===
==== Majority leadership ====
- President of the Senate: Stanley Aronoff
- President pro tempore of the Senate: Richard Finan
- Assistant pro tempore: Eugene J. Watts
- Whip: Robert R. Cupp

==== Minority leadership ====
- Leader: Robert Boggs
- Assistant Leader: Ben Espy
- Whip: Linda J. Furney
- Assistant Whip: Bob Nettle

=== Members of the 121st Ohio Senate ===
District	Senator	Party	First elected
1	M. Ben Gaeth	Republican	1974
2	Steve Yarbrough	Republican	1995 (Appt.)
3	Bruce E. Johnson	Republican	1994 (Appt.)
4	Scott Nein	Republican	1995 (Appt.)
5	Rhine McLin	Democratic	1994
6	Chuck Horn	Republican	1984
7	Richard Finan	Republican	1978 (Appt.)
8	Stanley Aronoff	Republican	1967
9	Janet C. Howard	Republican	1994
10	Merle G. Kearns	Republican	1991 (Appt.)
11	Linda J. Furney	Democratic	1986
12	Robert R. Cupp	Republican	1984
13	Alan Zaleski	Democrat	1982
14	Doug White	Republican	1996 (Appt.)
15	Ben Espy	Democratic	1992 (Appt.)
16	Eugene J. Watts	Republican	1984
17	Jan Michael Long	Democratic	1986
18	Robert Boggs	Democratic	1982
19	Richard Schafrath	Republican	1986
20	James E. Carnes	Republican	1995 (Appt.)
21	Jeffrey Johnson	Democratic	1990 (Appt.)
22	Grace L. Drake	Republican	1984 (Appt.)
23	Dennis Kucinich	Democratic	1994
24	Gary C. Suhadolnik	Republican	1980
25	Judy Sheerer	Democratic	1992 (Appt.)
26	Karen Gillmor	Republican	1992
27	Roy Ray	Republican	1986
28	Leigh Herington	Democratic	1995 (Appt.)
29	Scott Oelslager	Republican	1985 (Appt.)
30	Rob Burch	Democratic	1984
31	Nancy Dix	Republican	1994 (Appt.)
32	Anthony Latell Jr.	Democratic	1992
33	Joseph Vukovich	Democratic	1993 (Appt.)

== House of Representatives ==
=== Leadership ===
==== Majority leadership ====
- Speaker of the House: Jo Ann Davidson
- President pro tempore of the House: William G. Batchelder
- Floor Leader: Randy Gardner
- Assistant Majority Floor Leader: Scott Nein
- Majority Whip: Bob Corbin
- Assistant Majority Whip: Jim Buchy

==== Minority leadership ====
- Leader: Patrick Sweeney
- Assistant Leader: Jane Campbell
- Whip: Otto Beatty Jr.
- Assistant Whip: Ronald Gerberry

=== Members of the 121st Ohio House of Representatives ===
District	Representative	Party	First elected
1	Bill Thompson	Republican	1986
2	George E. Terwilleger	Republican	1992
3	Sean D. Logan	Democratic	1990 (Appt.)
4	Randy Gardner	Republican	1985 (Appt.)
5	Ross Boggs	Democratic	1982
6	Jon D. Myers	Republican	1990
7	Ron Amstutz	Republican	1980
8	C.J. Prentiss	Democratic	1990
9	Barbara Boyd	Democratic	1992
10	Troy Lee James	Democratic	1967
11	Jane Campbell	Democratic	1984
12	Vermel Whalen	Democratic	1986 (Appt.)
13	Barbara C. Pringle	Democratic	1982 (Appt.)
14	Ed Jerse	Democratic	1995 (Appt.)
15	Mike Wise	Republican	1992
16	Ed Kasputis	Republican	1990
17	Dan Brady	Democratic	1996 (Appt.)
18	Rocco Colonna	Democratic	1974
19	Patrick Sweeney	Democratic	1967
20	Ron Mottl	Democratic	1986
21	Otto Beatty Jr.	Democratic	1980 (Appt.)
22	Charleta Tavares	Democratic	1993 (Appt.)
23	Amy Salerno	Republican	1994
24	Jo Ann Davidson	Republican	1980
25	Jim Mason	Republican	1992
26	Patrick Tiberi	Republican	
27	E. J. Thomas	Republican	
28	Priscilla D. Mead	Republican	1992
29	Bill Schuck	Republican	
30	Samuel T. Britton	Democratic	1994
31	Mark Mallory	Democratic	1994
32	Dale N. Van Vyven	Republican	1978 (Appt.)
33	Jerome F. Luebbers	Democratic	1978
34	Cheryl Winkler	Republican	1990 (Appt.)
35	Lou Blessing	Republican	1982
36	Bob Schuler	Republican	1992
37	Jacquelyn K. O'Brien	Republican	1986
38	Lloyd Lewis Jr.	Democratic	1994
39	Tom Roberts	Democratic	1986 (Appt.)
40	Jeff Jacobson	Republican	
41	Don Mottley	Republican	1992
42	Bob Corbin	Republican	1976
43	Bob Netzley	Republican	1967
44	Vernon Sykes	Democratic	1983 (Appt.)
45	Karen Doty	Democratic	1992
46	Wayne Jones	Democratic	1988 (Appt.)
47	Betty Sutton	Democratic	1992
48	Twyla Roman	Republican	1994
49	Jack Ford	Democratic	1994
50	John Garcia	Republican	1994
51	Lynn Olman	Republican	1995 (Appt.)
52	Sally Perz	Republican	1992
53	Darrell Opfer	Democratic	1992
54	William J. Healy	Democratic	1974
55	Kirk Schuring	Republican	1994
56	Johnnie Maier Jr.	Democratic	1990
57	Ron Hood	Republican	1994
58	Gary Cates	Republican	1995 (Appt.)
59	Michael A. Fox	Republican	1974
60	Gene Krebs	Republican	
61	Dan Metelsky	Democratic	1996 (Appt.)
62	John Bender	Democratic	1992
63	Bill Taylor	Republican	1994
64	Bob Hagan	Democratic	1986
65	Ron Gerberry	Democratic	1974
66	Michael G. Verich	Democratic	1982
67	June Lucas	Democratic	1986
68	Diane Grendell	Republican	1992
69	Ray Sines	Republican	
70	Dan Troy	Democratic	1982
71	Sam Bateman	Republican	
72	Rose Vesper	Republican	
73	David Hartley	Democratic	1972
74	Joe Haines	Republican	1980
75	Ann H. Womer Benjamin	Republican	1994
76	Marilyn Reid	Republican	1992
77	Jay Hottinger	Republican	1994
78	Mary Abel	Democratic	1989 (Appt.)
79	Frank Sawyer	Democratic	1982
87	Joan Lawrence	Republican	1982
81	William G. Batchelder	Republican	1968
82	Richard Hodges	Republican	1992
83	Lynn Wachtmann	Republican	1984
84	Jim Buchy	Republican	
85	Jim Jordan	Republican	1994
86	Chuck Brading	Republican	
87	Ed Core	Republican	
88	Dennis Stapleton	Republican	1996 (Appt.)
89	Rex Damschroder	Republican	1994
90	Randy Weston	Democratic	1990
91	Mike Shoemaker	Democratic	1982
92	William L. Ogg	Democratic	1994
93	Bill Harris	Republican	1994
94	John Carey	Republican	1994
95	Joy Padgett	Republican	1992
96	Tom Johnson	Republican	1976
97	Kerry R. Metzger	Republican	1994
98	Jerry W. Krupinski	Democratic	1986
99	Jack Cera	Democratic	1982

Appt.- Member was appointed to current House Seat

== See also ==
- Ohio House of Representatives membership, 126th General Assembly
- Ohio House of Representatives membership, 125th General Assembly
- List of Ohio state legislatures
