= Ohio's 31st senatorial district =

American legislative district

Ohio's 31st State Senate district
Senator
Al Landis; R–Dover
- Demographics: 91% White; 3.2% Black; 2.4% Hispanic; 0.8% Asian; 2.2% Native American; 0.1% Hawaiian/Pacific Islander
- Population (2020) • Voting age • Citizens of voting age: 345,256; 266,354; 260,574

Ohio's 31st senatorial district is made up of counties on the east side of central Ohio, including the western half of Guernsey County and all of Wayne, Tuscarawas and Massingham Counties. The district comrpises House Districts 51, 77 and 97.

The current Ohio Senator is Republican Al Landis who was reelected for another term in November 2026.

== 2026 Election Results ==
Al Landus (R) 77,436 65.6%

Laura Sirot (D) 40,672 34.4%

== Historically ==
Before the 2023 redistricting, Ohio's 31st senatorial district had been based in central Ohio since 1982 and consisted of the counties of Coshocton, Licking, Perry and Tuscarawas along with portions of Holmes county. It encompassed Ohio House districts 71, 72 and 98. It had a Cook PVI of R+21.

== List of senators ==
Senator	Party	Term	Notes
Eugene Branstool	Democrat	January 3, 1983 – December 31, 1990	Branstool opted not to run for re-election in 1990 and instead ran for Lieutenant Governor of Ohio.
Steven O. Williams	Republican	January 3, 1991 – December 31, 1993	Williams resigned to take a seat on the Fairfield County Juvenile Court.
Nancy Dix	Republican	January 4, 1994 – February 20, 1998	Dix resigned prior to the expiration of her term in 1998.
Jay Hottinger	Republican	February 20, 1998 – December 31, 2006	Hottinger was term-limited in 2006 and ran for the Ohio House of Representatives.
Tim Schaffer	Republican	January 2, 2007 – December 31, 2014	Schaffer was term-limited in 2014.
Jay Hottinger	Republican	January 6, 2015 – December 31, 2022	Hottinger was term-limited in 2022.
Al Landis	Republican	January 3, 2023 – present	Incumbent
