= Verich =

Verich is a surname. Notable people with the surname include:

- Chris Verich, American politician
- Michael G. Verich, American politician, brother of Chris
