= William Ogg =

William Ogg may refer to:

- Sir William Gammie Ogg (1891–1979), British horticultural scientist
- William L. Ogg, Ohio politician
