= Kevin Bacon (politician) =

American politician

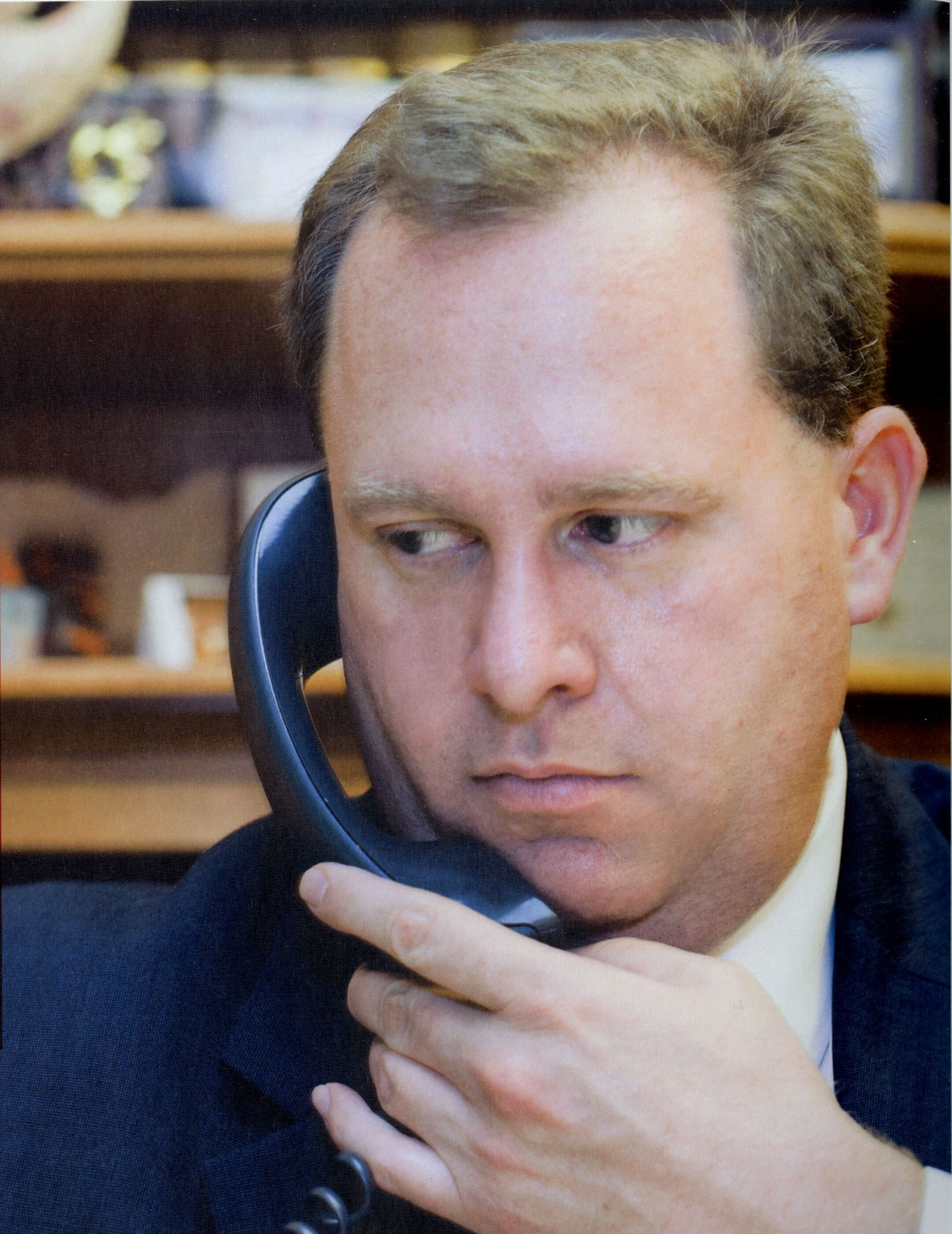

Member of the Ohio Senate from the 3rd district
- In office January 3, 2011 – December 31, 2018
- Preceded by: David Goodman
- Succeeded by: Tina Maharath

Member of the Ohio House of Representatives from the 21st district
- In office January 2, 2007 – December 31, 2010
- Preceded by: Linda Reidelbach
- Succeeded by: Mike Duffey

Personal details
- Born: November 27, 1971 (age 54) Defiance, Ohio, U.S.
- Party: Republican
- Children: 3
- Education: Miami University, Oxford (BA) Capital University (JD)

Kevin Bacon (born November 27, 1971) is a former state senator for the 3rd District of the Ohio Senate, who served from 2011 to 2018. Formerly, he served in the Ohio House of Representatives from 2007 to 2010, and as a Blendon Township Trustee. Bacon represented portions of Franklin County, including Westerville, New Albany, Gahanna, Whitehall, Reynoldsburg, Canal Winchester, Obetz, Valley View, Marble Cliff and portions of Columbus.

An attorney, Bacon also served as Chairman of the Senate Committee on Civil Justice. He is a Republican.

== Career ==
Bacon was born and raised in Defiance, Ohio. After graduation from Miami University and Capital Law School, Bacon, a private practice attorney, previously worked for Farmer's Insurance and the Ohio Department of Commerce and as a prosecutor for the City of Lancaster, Ohio. He currently is an attorney, of counsel, with the law firm of Appel & Hellstedt, located in Worthington, Ohio. He also served as a Blendon Township Trustee.

When incumbent Linda Reidelbach announced that she would not seek another term, Bacon was among three who sought to replace her. Bacon faced a clear shot in the primary. With the district being one that Democrats sought to pick up, Bacon faced a somewhat difficult challenge in the 2006 general election, and it was one of the most closely targeted races in the cycle. The campaign was subject to many attack ads from both sides. He bested Democrat Dean Hernandez by fewer than 1000 votes. In his first term, Speaker of the House Jon Husted appointed Bacon Vice Chairman of the House Judiciary Committee.

In 2008, Bacon beat Democratic nominee Jay Perez 51%-45% in an overwhelmingly Democratic year.

== Ohio Senate ==
With incumbent Senator David Goodman unable to seek another term, Bacon announced in May 2009 that he would run for the Ohio Senate. After no competition in the primary, he faced Democrat Mark Pfeifer in the general election, and won the election 50%-43%.

Bacon was the primary sponsor of Senate Bill 9, which updates Ohio’s insurance laws to reflect recent changes in federal health care laws. SB 9 suspends the Open Enrollment Program, the Ohio Health Reinsurance Program, and the conversion of health insurance policies option. The bill was signed into law by Governor John Kasich on June 4, 2013.

In 2014, Bacon was re-elected with 61% of the vote. For the 131st Ohio General Assembly, Bacon served as Chairman of the Senate Committee on Civil Justice.

=== Committee assignments (131st General Assembly) ===
- Committee on Civil Justice (Chair)
- Committee on Insurance (Vice Chair)
- Committee on Criminal Justice
- Finance Subcommittee on Higher Education
- Committee on Financial Institutions
- Committee on Public Utilities
- Committee on Transportation, Commerce & Labor

== Electoral history ==
Election results
Year	Office		Votes		%	Votes	%
2001	Blendon Township Trustee	Kevin Bacon	1,042	35%			
2005	Blendon Township Trustee	Kevin Bacon	1,556	46%			
2006	Ohio House of Representatives	Kevin Bacon	19,866	51%	Dean Hernandez	18,900	49%
2008	Ohio House of Representatives	Kevin Bacon	27,494	52%	Jay Perez	24,073	48%
2010	Ohio Senate	Kevin Bacon	72,337	51%	Mark Pfeiffer	63,844	45%
2014	Ohio Senate	Kevin Bacon	50,726	61%	Star Johnson	31,976	39%
