= Kasputis =

Kasputis is a surname. Notable people with the surname include:

- Artūras Kasputis (born 1967), Lithuanian cyclist
- Ed Kasputis (born 1961), American politician
