= Carano (surname) =

Carano is a toponymic surname of Italian origin. Notable people with the surname include:

- Gina Carano (born 1982), American actress and former mixed martial artist
- Glenn Carano (born 1955), former American football quarterback
- Kenneth Carano, American politician

== See also ==
- Carano, a village in Trentino-Alto Adige/Südtirol, Italy
- El Caraño Airport, an airport serving Quibdó, Colombia
- Cerano
