= Jim Mettler =

American politician

Member of the Ohio House of Representatives from the 52nd district
- In office October 20, 1999 – December 31, 2000
- Preceded by: Sally Perz
- Succeeded by: Teresa Fedor

Personal details
- Party: Republican

Jim Mettler was a member of the Ohio House of Representatives from 1999–2000. His district consisted of a portion of Lucas County, Ohio. He was succeeded by Teresa Fedor.
