= Virginia Aveni =

American politician

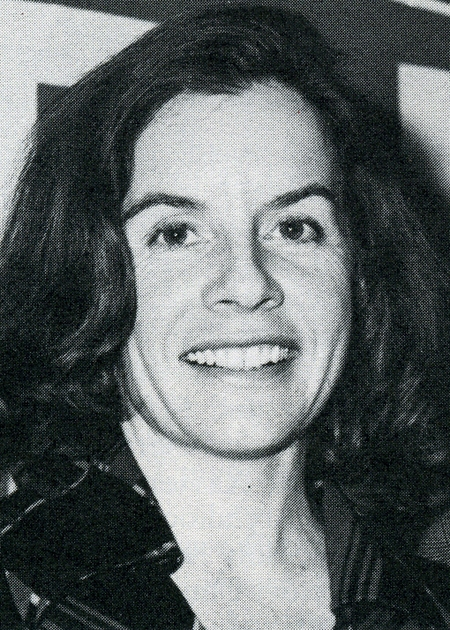

Member of the Ohio House of Representatives from the 17th district
- In office January 3, 1973 – December 31, 1978
- Preceded by: Anthony Russo
- Succeeded by: Matt Hatchadorian

Personal details
- Born: Virginia Lee Baldwin; October 5, 1933 (age 92) Selma, Alabama, U.S.
- Party: Democratic
- Spouse(s): Joseph T. Aveni (m. 1957)

Virginia Lee Aveni (née Baldwin; October 5, 1933) is an American politician in the state of Ohio. She was a member of the Ohio House of Representatives for the 17th district between 1973 and 1978. Aveni holds degrees from the University of Redlands and the University of Arizona and studied at Cleveland State University.
