= Matt Hatchadorian =

American politician

Member of the Ohio House of Representatives from the 17th district
- In office January 3, 1979-December 31, 1982
- Preceded by: Virginia Aveni
- Succeeded by: Judy Sheerer

Personal details
- Born: April 9, 1941 (age 85)
- Party: Republican

Matt Hatchadorian is a former member of the Ohio House of Representatives. He was a Republican candidate for Congress in 1984, losing to Rep. Ed Feighan.
