= Daniel Sferra =

American politician

Dan Sferra

Member of the Ohio House of Representatives from the 64th district
- In office January 3, 2001 – December 31, 2004
- Preceded by: Chris Verich
- Succeeded by: Randy Law

Personal details
- Party: Democratic

Dan Sferra is a former member of the Ohio House of Representatives, representing the 64th District from 2001 to 2004.
