= Marguerite Bowman =

American politician (1918–1997)

Marguerite E. Bowman
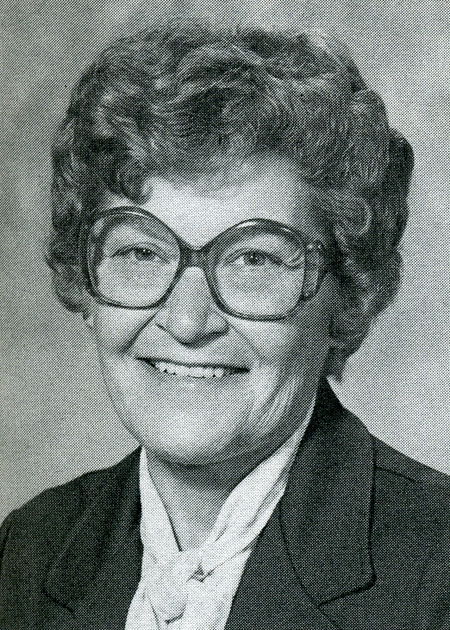

Member of the Ohio House of Representatives from the 54th district
- In office January 3, 1981-December 31, 1982
- Preceded by: John Bara
- Succeeded by: John Bara

Personal details
- Born: Marguerite E. Kilma; May 9, 1918 Cleveland, Ohio
- Died: September 20, 1997 (aged 79) Elyria, Ohio
- Party: Republican

Marguerite E. Bowman (May 9, 1918 – September 20, 1997) was a member of the Ohio House of Representatives. She was the first woman elected mayor of Elyria, Ohio from 1976 to 1979.
