= John Rogers (Ohio politician) =

American politician

John M. Rogers
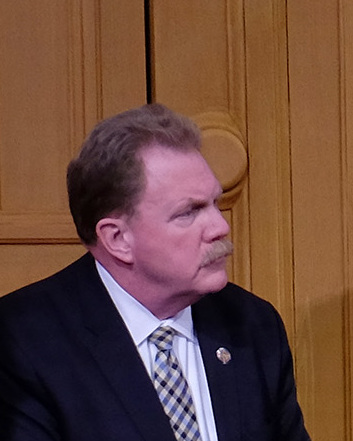

Member of the Ohio House of Representatives from the 60th district
- In office January 7, 2013 – December 31, 2020
- Preceded by: Lorraine Fende
- Succeeded by: Dan Troy

Personal details
- Born: Cleveland, Ohio
- Party: Democratic
- Spouse: Rosemarie
- Education: Cuyahoga Community College (A.A.); Hiram College (B.A.); John Carroll University (M.B.A.); Cleveland-Marshall College of Law (J.D.)
- Profession: Attorney

John M. Rogers is a former Democratic member of the Ohio House of Representatives, representing the 60th District which includes the Lake County communities of Eastlake, Fairport Harbor, Grand River, Lakeline, Mentor-on-the-Lake, Painesville, Timberlake, Wickliffe, Willoughby, Willowick, as well as parts of both Mentor and Painesville Township. He was first elected in 2012.

Prior to his election, Rogers was mayor of Mentor-on-the-Lake for 18 years and a Mentor-on-the-Lake city councilman for five years. He has also served as Lake County deputy treasurer and Lake County assistant prosecutor. He was chosen for the 60th District ticket by the party central committee after Lake County Commissioner Dan Troy withdrew. In the election Rogers defeated Republican Lori DiNallo with 55.47% of the vote. He would go on to be re-elected in 2014, 2016, and 2018. He was a conservative Democrat who opposed abortion and supported gun rights.
