= Raymond Luther =

American politician (1931–2003)

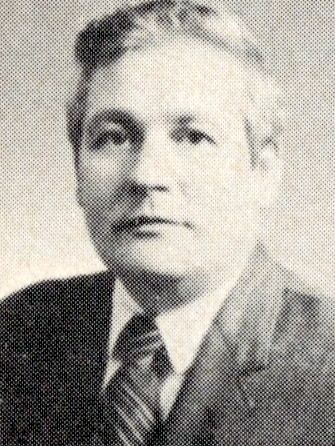

Member of the Ohio House of Representatives from the 1st district
- In office January 3, 1971 – December 31, 1974
- Preceded by: John McDonald
- Succeeded by: Eugene Branstool

Personal details
- Born: September 5, 1931
- Died: January 18, 2003 (aged 71) Newark, Ohio, United States
- Party: Republican

Raymond Paul Luther (September 5, 1931 – January 18, 2003) was a Republican politician who formerly served in the Ohio General Assembly. When House minority leader John McDonald opted to run for Ohio Attorney General in 1970, Luther entered the race to succeed him. He won, and was sworn into the Ohio House of Representatives on January 3, 1971. In 1972, Luther won a second term, now representing the First District.

In 1974, Luther sought to again run for the House, and was challenged by Democrat Eugene Branstool, a farmer from Utica, Ohio. With the race proving to be contested, Luther lost to Branstool, ending his House tenure at two terms. It would mark the last time Luther held public office.

Following his defeat, Luther returned to Newark and began a private law firm, Luther Esquire.
