= Mike Duffey =

American politician

Member of the Ohio House of Representatives from the 21st district
- In office January 3, 2011 – January 3, 2019
- Preceded by: Kevin Bacon
- Succeeded by: Beth Liston

Personal details
- Born: December 14, 1977 (age 48) Columbus, Ohio, U.S.
- Party: Republican
- Education: University of Michigan (BA); Ohio State University (JD)

Mike Duffey (born December 14, 1977) is an American politician who was appointed as Senior Vice Chancellor of the Ohio Department of Higher Education in January 2019. Duffey served as a member of the Ohio House of Representatives from 2011 to 2019.

== Career ==
Duffey graduated with honors from Thomas Worthington High School in 1996. Four years later, he earned his bachelor's degree in political science from the University of Michigan. While in college, Duffey interned in the Washington, D.C. office of Congressman John Kasich, later Governor of Ohio. He also worked for Ohio Secretary of State J. Kenneth Blackwell.

From 2003 to 2010, Duffey was employed with Hinson Ltd Public Relations and in 2008 was promoted to Director of Media Relations. Prior to that, from 2001 to 2003, he worked as a reporter for Hannah News Service, covering the Ohio legislature as a member of the Ohio Legislative Correspondents Association (OLCA). He is a former twice-elected member of Worthington City Council.

== Ohio House of Representatives ==
When incumbent Representative Kevin Bacon decided to run for the state Senate seat being vacated by David Goodman, Duffey entered the race to replace him. Uncontested in the Republican primary, Duffey faced Democrat David Robinson in the general election. With Bacon out of the race, Democrats saw the 21st District as one of their top pick-ups of the cycle. The race proved to be one of the closest in the state in 2010: Duffey bested Robinson by 377 votes.

He was sworn in on January 3, 2011, and served as a member of the Finance and Appropriations Committee; the Financial Institutions, Housing, and Urban Development Committee; the Health and Aging Committee; and the Local Government Committee. He was also a member of the Joint Committee on Agency Rule Review.

Duffey won reelection to his seat in 2012 with 52.13% of the vote over Democrat Donna O'Connor.

=== Actions ===
In his freshman term, Duffey offered legislation to privatize oversight of the state's Department of Development, a major campaign plank of Governor John Kasich. Duffey described the bill as a "framework" for a program that would be updated after six months with input from the DOD director. "Unlike a government agency, a private economic development corporation can move at the same speed as private industry, respond to changing markets and partner with the private sector," he said. "This, in turn, increases the likelihood of job creation in our state."

Duffy voted for S.B. 5, which limits collective bargaining for public employees, out of the Ohio House. When a referendum was offered to overturn the measure, Duffey said opponents would have a difficult time persuading voters to overturn a law that "is a restoration of power to the taxpayers and to the voters."

Duffey, while an opponent of the estate tax, has questioned the timing of its abolishment, citing the drastic cuts that are already taking place on the local level. Over 80% of estate tax revenue goes to local government.

== Publications ==
Duffey contributed to Project 2025. He is thanked for his contribution to Chapter 2: "Executive Office of the President of the United States".
