= Larry Christman =

American politician

Member of the Ohio House of Representatives from the 67th district
- In office January 3, 1973-December 31, 1980
- Preceded by: District established
- Succeeded by: Russ Guerra

Personal details
- Party: Democratic

Larry Christman is a Democratic politician who served as a member of the Ohio House of Representatives. A native of Ohio, Christman obtained a bachelor's degree from Bluffton College and a Juris Doctor from Ohio State University. In 1972, new districts allowed Christman to seek an open seat, which he won. He won reelection in 1972, and again three more times. He served in leadership positions throughout his tenure, notably as vice-chairman of the House Education Committee.

By 1980, Christman had served eight years in a majority Republican district. In the general elections of that year Russ Guerra faced Christman in one of the closest watched races of the cycle, and ultimately won, in what was an overwhelmingly Republican year. Christman left office in December 1980, and returned to private practice.

Christmanserved as president of the Association of Independent Colleges and Universities of Ohio (AICUO) from 1983 to 2005. Currently, he is a Senior Consultant for the higher education practice of R. H. Perry & Associates.
