= Scribner Fauver =

American politician (1931–2018)

Member of the Ohio House of Representatives from the 54th district
- In office January 3, 1975 – December 31, 1976
- Preceded by: Don Pease
- Succeeded by: John Bara

Personal details
- Born: June 1, 1931 Elyria, Ohio, U.S.
- Died: June 6, 2018 (aged 87)
- Party: Republican

Scribner Lee Fauver (June 1, 1931 – June 6, 2018) was an American politician who was a member of the Ohio House of Representatives. He died on June 6, 2018, at the age of 87.
