= Robert Regula =

American politician

Member of the Ohio House of Representatives from the 49th district
- In office January 3, 1978 – December 31, 1978
- Preceded by: Irene Smart
- Succeeded by: Chuck Red Ash

Personal details
- Born: January 18, 1923 Bucks, Tuscarawas County, Ohio USA
- Died: May 19, 1996 (aged 73) Canton, Stark County, Ohio
- Party: Democratic

Robert L. Regula (January 18, 1923 – May 19, 1996) was a Democratic politician who served in the General Assembly in the U.S. state of Ohio in 1978.

== Life ==
Regula was born in Bucks, Tuscarawas County, Ohio, to Alvin G. and Emma E. Regula. He entered the US Army in January 1943, during World War II. After the war he lived in Canton, worked at Ohio Bell Telephone, and was active in local politics. As an employee of the Ohio Bell Telephone Company and a former township trustee, Regula was appointed to succeed Representative Irene Smart in 1978, whose seat became vacant when she was appointed to a judiciary position. Soon after his appointment, Regula won a tough primary battle for the Democratic nomination. He lost the general election to Chuck Red Ash a popular high school football coach. Regula spent one year, or half a term, in the Ohio House of Representatives.

Regula remained active in local politics, but held no further public office. He died in Canton in 1996, age 73.
