= Irene Smart =

American politician

Member of the Ohio House of Representatives from the 49th district
- In office January 3, 1973 – January 3, 1978
- Preceded by: Ross Heintzelman
- Succeeded by: Robert Regula

Personal details
- Born: March 24, 1921 Cleveland, Ohio
- Died: May 3, 2017 (aged 96) Ohio, U.S.
- Party: Democratic

Irene Balogh Smart (March 24, 1921 – May 3, 2017) was an Ohio Democratic Party politician and a former member of the Ohio General Assembly. Smart was a graduate of Wittenberg University, Harvard University, and the William McKinley School of Law. An attorney by trade, Smart first ran for the Ohio House of Representatives in 1972, and defeated Republican incumbent Ross Heintzelman in a narrow victory. She won reelection in 1974, and 1976.

In 1977, Smart ran for Canton City Municipal Judge, and won. She took the bench in 1978, resigning her House seat to do so, and was succeeded by Robert Regula. She served on the municipal court until 1985, when she moved up to the Stark County Court of Common Pleas. In 1988, Smart again moved up, this time to the Ohio 5th District Court of Appeals. In 1994, Smart was unable to seek another term since she had hit the 70-year age limit, and retired at the end of her term.
