= Kenneth Carano =

American politician

Ken Carano

Member of the Ohio House of Representatives from the 59th district
- In office January 3, 2001 – April 29, 2007
- Preceded by: Ron Gerberry
- Succeeded by: Ron Gerberry

Personal details
- Party: Democratic

Ken Carano is a former Democratic member of the Ohio House of Representatives, representing the 59th District from 2001 to 2007.

Ken also served as Austintown Township Trustee and as the General Manager of Austintown Community Television.
