= Jay Hottinger =

American politician (born 1969)

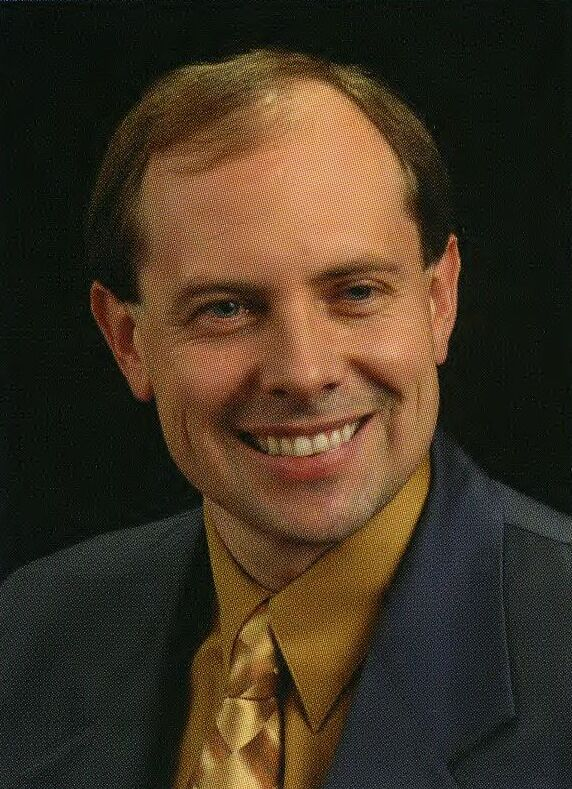

President pro tempore of the Ohio Senate
- In office January 4, 2021 – January 3, 2023
- Preceded by: Bob Peterson
- Succeeded by: Kirk Schuring

Member of the Ohio Senate from the 31st district
- Incumbent
- Assumed office January 5, 2015
- Preceded by: Tim Schaffer
- In office February 20, 1998 – December 31, 2006
- Preceded by: Nancy Dix
- Succeeded by: Tim Schaffer

Member of the Ohio House of Representatives from the 71st district
- In office January 2, 2007 – December 31, 2014
- Preceded by: David Evans
- Succeeded by: Scott Ryan
- In office January 3, 1995 – February 20, 1998
- Preceded by: Marc Guthrie
- Succeeded by: David Evans

Personal details
- Born: December 1, 1969 (age 56) Newark, Ohio, U.S.
- Party: Republican
- Spouse: Cheri Hottinger
- Children: 3
- Education: Capital University (BA)

Jay Hottinger (born December 1, 1969) is a Republican member of the Ohio Senate for the 31st district. A longtime member of the Ohio General Assembly, Hottinger has served in both the Ohio House of Representatives and the Senate since 1995. His current district includes Coshocton, New Lexington, New Philadelphia, and Newark. Hottinger serves as the President pro tempore of the Ohio Senate.

== Early life and career ==
Hottinger attended Newark High School and has a degree in political science and public administration from Capital University. He is married with three daughters.

His professional experience includes working as an office manager for Jay Company and an electrical contractor. Hottinger was a member of the Newark City Council from 1992 to 1994 and served as its President Pro Tempore in 1994.

== Ohio General Assembly ==
In 1994, Hottinger made his first run for the Ohio House of Representatives. He was only 25 years old, but had already served on the Newark City Council for three years. He went on to defeat his challenger to succeed Marc Guthrie. He would win re-election in 1996.

When Senator Nancy Dix resigned from the Senate in 1998, creating a vacancy in the 31st Senate District, Senate Republicans chose Hottinger to replace her. With the seat up for re-election in 1998, Hottinger faced former Senator Eugene Branstool, who had been defeated by Dix a few years prior. However, he went on to defeat Branstool with 58.85% of the vote. He ran unopposed for re-election in 2002.

Later on in his Senate tenure, Hottinger served as assistant majority whip, as well as chairman of the Senate Insurance, Commerce and Labor Committee. He has been an outspoken critic of Medicaid expansion in Ohio.

In 2005, Hottinger announced that he would seek his former House seat. Soon after, Hottinger was also mentioned as a potential running mate to gubernatorial candidate Ken Blackwell, who chose Rep. Tom Raga instead, however. Unopposed in the primary, he faced Democrat Thomas Holliday in the general election, and won with 61.83% of the vote. In his first term back into the House, Speaker of the House Jon Husted appointed Hottinger as chairman of the House Finance Committee.

Hottinger was reelected in 2008 against Democrat Howard Hill with 62% of the vote. In 2010, he won a third term in the House with 69.31% of the vote against Democrat Nathan McMann. He won a final House term in 2012 with 61% over Democrat Brady Jones.

== 2014 election and return to the Ohio Senate ==
Hottinger was term-limited in 2014, as was his predecessor in the 31st district of the Ohio Senate, Tim Schaffer. As a result, Hottinger announced he would run again for his former Senate seat.

While his former district was also the 31st, the new 31st is entirely different following redistricting. Prior to 2012, the 31st included Fairfield, Licking, Perry, Hocking and parts of Pickaway counties. After, it includes Licking, Perry, Coshocton, Tuscarawas and parts of Holmes counties. As a result, the majority of the district Hottinger ran in for the 2014 election was different. Despite all of this, Hottinger won election to the Senate 65% to 35%. For the 131st Ohio General Assembly, Hottinger has been named as chairman of the Senate Insurance Committee.

=== Committee assignments ===
- Committee on Insurance (Chair)
- Committee on State & Local Government (Vice Chair)
- Committee on Energy & Natural Resources
- Finance Subcommittee on Workforce
- Committee on Financial Institutions
- Committee on Health & Human Services
- Committee on Transportation, Commerce & Labor

In 2018, Hottinger defeated Melinda Miller in the general election for the 31st district.

Ohio Senate
Preceded by Bob Peterson	President pro tempore of the Ohio Senate; 2021–2023	Succeeded by Kirk Schuring
