= Tim Schaffer =

American politician (born 1963)

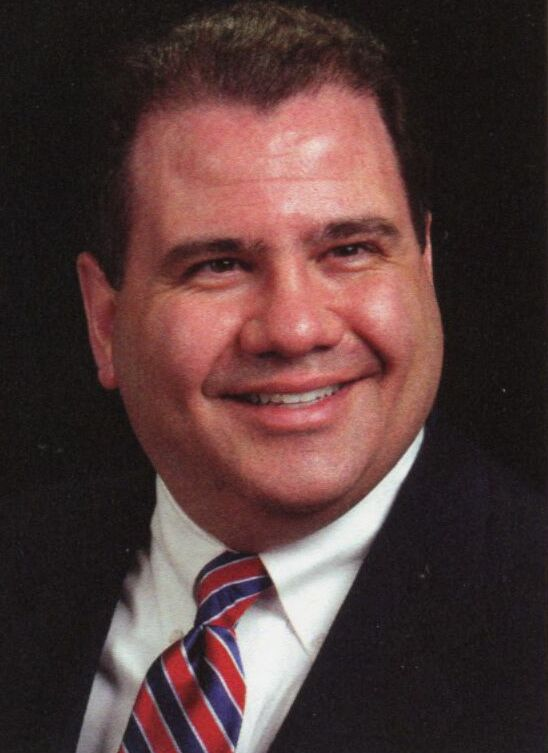

Member of the Ohio Senate from the 20th district
- Incumbent
- Assumed office May 10, 2019
- Preceded by: Brian Hill
- In office January 2, 2007 – December 31, 2014
- Preceded by: Jay Hottinger
- Succeeded by: Jay Hottinger

Member of the Ohio House of Representatives from the 77th district
- In office January 6, 2015 – May 10, 2019
- Preceded by: Gerald Stebleton
- Succeeded by: Jeff LaRe
- In office January 3, 2001 – December 31, 2006
- Preceded by: Jon D. Myers
- Succeeded by: Gerald Stebleton

Personal details
- Born: January 25, 1963 (age 63) Columbus, Ohio, U.S.
- Party: Republican
- Spouse: Lori Schaffer
- Education: Mount Union College
- Profession: Charity & Association Executive

Tim Schaffer (born January 25, 1963) is a Republican member of the Ohio Senate. He was a member of the Ohio House of Representatives from 2001 until 2006, and of the Ohio Senate from 2007 to 2014 and also previously represented the 77th District of the Ohio House of Representatives from 2015 until 2019.

== Career ==
Schaffer holds a B.A. in Political Science and Communications from Mount Union College, and has also served as chairman of the Fairfield County, Ohio, Republican Party.

With Representative Jon D. Myers unable to run for another term due to term limitations, Schaffer, along with Bryan Fox, vied for the Republican nomination. Schaffer won the nomination with 58% of the electorate. He faced Democrat Dennis Lupher in the general election, and won again with 58% of the votes.

In 2002, Schaffer coasted to a second term unopposed. In 2004, Schaffer again faced primary opposition in Bradley J. Sodders, but won with 85.58% of the vote. He again ran unopposed in the general election, and was sworn into a third term on January 3, 2005.

Schaffer is not eligible to run for re-election to the Senate in 2014 due to term limits. He is instead running for District 77 in the Ohio House of Representatives.

== Ohio Senate ==
Since Jay Hottinger was unable to run again for his seat in the Ohio Senate, Schaffer sacrificed a fourth term in the House to run for the Thirty First District of the Senate. In a three-way primary with fellow Representative Ron Hood and Jeff Furr, Schaffer won the nomination with 48.59% of the vote. Again facing Dennis Lupher, Schaffer moved to the Senate, earning 57.26% of the votes.

Schaffer was selected to replace retiring Senator Hill on May 7, 2019. In his first term, Schaffer served as Chairman of the Senate Environment and Natural Resources Committee in the 128th General Assembly.

In 2010, Schaffer, again facing Lupher, won a second Senate term with 67.29% of the vote. Subsequently, Senate President Tom Niehaus named Schaffer as a member of the committees on Agriculture, Environment and Natural Resources (as vice chairman); Energy and Public Utilities; Insurance, Commerce and Labor; and Ways and Means and Economic Development (as Chairman).

=== Tenure ===
For one of his first measures in the 129th General Assembly, Schaffer has introduced a bill that directs the state auditor to conduct at least four performance audits per biennium of two executive agencies and two non-executive agencies.

Schaffer has also introduced legislation that allows for holders of a concealed carry license to carry their weapons in bars and restaurants provided that they are not consuming alcohol. The bill was controversial, but passed the Republican-controlled Ohio Senate. Schaffer has stated Ohio is the only state with "specific mandates" on how guns must be carried in vehicles. He said the restrictions are confusing and have led to the arrest of out-of-state residents unaware of the law. The National Rifle Association of America-backed bill was staunchly opposed by law enforcement groups such as the Ohio Association of Chiefs of Police and Fraternal Order of Police of Ohio. The bill ultimately passed and was signed into law by Ohio Governor John Kasich.

Schaffer was the primary sponsor of Senate Bill 16, a bill that increases the penalty of assault against "emergency service responders", on or off duty, or their family members to a felony. Someone could also face misdemeanor charges if they threaten them with a weapon as well as prevent them from responding to or leaving an emergency. The bill was designed to protect police officers, firefighters, emergency medical technicians and their families.

Scaffer was the primary sponsor of Senate Bill 50, which proposed to change the time at which 14- and 15-year-old children must stop working during the school year from 7 PM to 9PM, but which was vetoed by Governor Mike DeWine in December 2025. Schaffer also sponsored a similar bill in 2023.
