= Nipgen, Ohio =

Unincorporated community in Ross County, Ohio, United States

Coordinates: 39°11′28″N 83°08′58″W

Nipgen is an unincorporated community in Ross County, in the U.S. state of Ohio.

== History ==
The community has the name of John A. Nipgen, an area resident. A post office called Nipgen was established in 1887, and remained in operation until 1906. Besides the post office, Nipgen had a country store.
