= Twyla Roman =

American politician (born 1941)

Member of the Ohio House of Representatives from the 48th district
- In office January 3, 1995 – December 31, 2002
- Preceded by: Tom Seese
- Succeeded by: Mary Taylor

Personal details
- Born: July 20, 1941 (age 85) Brimfield Township, Ohio
- Party: Republican

Twyla Roman (born July 20, 1941-December 1, 2022) was a Republican member of the Ohio House of Representatives. She represented district in Summit County, Ohio from 1995-2002. She was succeeded by eventual Ohio Auditor Mary Taylor.
