= Chris Verich =

American politician

Member of the Ohio House of Representatives from the 66th district
- In office December 8, 1998 – December 31, 2000
- Preceded by: Michael G. Verich
- Succeeded by: Daniel Sferra

Personal details
- Party: Democratic

Chris Verich was a member of the Ohio House of Representatives. His district consisted of a portion of Trumbull County, Ohio. He was appointed to replace his brother Michael, who had won a ninth term in office but who had resigned to take up a position on the Ohio State Employment Relations Board (SERB) before the term commenced in January 1999. Chris Verich was defeated in the 2000 Democratic Primary by Daniel Sferra, who won at that year's election and succeeded him in January 2001.
