= John O'Brien (Ohio politician) =

American politician (1932–1985)

Member of the Ohio House of Representatives from the 26th district
- In office January 3, 1981-March 30, 1985
- Preceded by: Bob Taft
- Succeeded by: Jacquelyn K. O'Brien

Personal details
- Died: March 30, 1985 (aged 53) Washington, D.C., United States
- Party: Republican

John O'Brien (1932 - 1985) was a member of the Ohio House of Representatives.

A Republican, Mr. O'Brien was elected to the Ohio House in November 1980 and took office Jan. 3, 1981. He died in office March 30, 1985, and was succeeded by his widow, Jacquelyn K. O'Brien.

Before his election to the legislature, Mr. O'Brien was a member of the Anderson Township Board of Trustees, a position to which he was first elected in November 1973. In 1980 Mr. and Mrs. O'Brien were leaders in creation of the first Anderson Township Library Committee, which successfully organized community and financial support for a community branch of the Public Library of Cincinnati and Hamilton County.

John and Jackie O'Brien are the parents of three adult children, John Todd O'Brien (1958), Holly O. Saunders and Heather O. Krombholz.
