= Robert Brown (Ohio politician) =

American politician

Robert E Brown

Member of the Ohio House of Representatives from the 5th district
- In office January 3, 1978-November 15, 1984
- Preceded by: Charles Kurfess(1978)
- Succeeded by: Randy Gardner (Ohio politician)

Personal details
- Born: November 11, 1930 Fremont, Ohio
- Died: May 15, 2001 (aged 70) Whitehouse, Ohio
- Party: Republican
- Spouse: Cleva Brown
- Profession: Director of the Ohio Department of Mental Retardation and Developmental Disabilities, Ohio State Representative (re-elected three times)

Robert E. Brown was a member of the Ohio House of Representatives from Perrysburg, serving from 1978-1985. Before his election he was executive director of the Zucker Center for the mentally handicapped and afterwards he became director of the Ohio department of mental retardation and developmental disabilities. Died on May 15, 2001.
