= Ohio Senate Committees =

The Ohio Senate Committees are the legislative sub-organizations in the Ohio Senate that handle specific topics of legislation that come before the full Senate. Committee membership enables members to develop specialized knowledge of the matters under their jurisdiction. Currently, there is only one announced committee in the 131st Ohio General Assembly.

== Rules ==
The Senate Rules Committee is tasked with determining what legislation will be moved to the floor of the Senate. It is generally made up of leadership in the Senate, and currently is chaired by Senate President Keith Faber.

Majority	Minority
Keith Faber, Chair; Chris Widener; Tom Patton; Larry Obhof; Scott Oelslager; David Burke; Bill Coley; Jim Hughes	Joe Schiavoni, Ranking Member; Charleta Tavares; Edna Brown; Lou Gentile

== Links ==
- The Ohio Senate
