= Russ Guerra =

American politician

Member of the Ohio House of Representatives from the 40th district
- In office January 3, 1981-April 19, 1992
- Preceded by: Larry Christman
- Succeeded by: Jeff Jacobson

Personal details
- Born: October 30, 1924 Dayton, Ohio, United States
- Died: April 19, 1992 (aged 67) Montgomery, Ohio, United States
- Party: Republican

Emil Russell Guerra (October 30, 1924 – April 19, 1992) was a Republican politician and a former member of the Ohio House of Representatives. A native of Dayton, Ohio and graduate of Fairview High School, Guerra served in World War II and was awarded the Purple Heart for his service. He went on to work his way up to the rank of captain in the Dayton Police Department. and retired from the force after over twenty five years. In the late 1960s, Guerra faced a near fatal gunshot wound, but recovered to return to the police force. He also acted as an air scout for local news stations.

In the 1970s, Guerra made his first entrance into politics by winning the election for Randolph Township Trustee. He served in this position from 1975 to 1980.

In 1980, Guerra, who was Republican, ran against incumbent Representative Larry Christman, who had served for over eight years. In a historically Republican year led by Ronald Reagan, Guerra defeated Christman to take the seat. He would go on to win five more terms, serving all within the minority.

Midway through his fifth term in 1991, Guerra was stricken with cancer and died with nine months left in his term. House Republicans appointed Jeff Jacobson, to finish the remainder of his term. Jacobson would go on to serve for four more terms, and as a state senator.
