= Jolynn Boster =

American politician

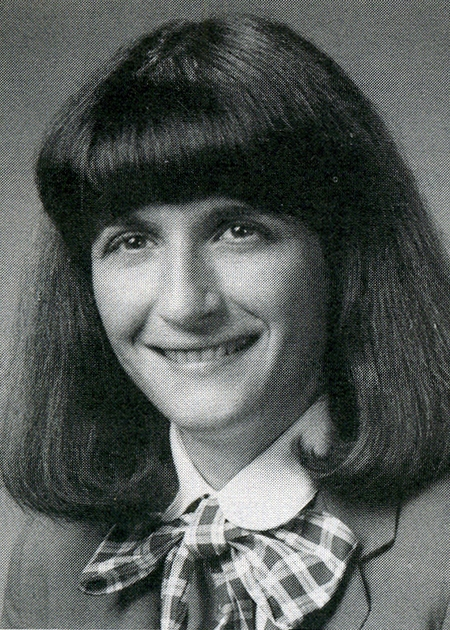

Member of the Ohio House of Representatives from the 94th district
- In office January 3, 1983 – April 24, 1989
- Preceded by: Claire Ball
- Succeeded by: Mary Abel

Personal details
- Party: Democratic

Jolynn Boster (born March 21, 1951) is a former member of the Ohio House of Representatives. She was the second woman ever elected to serve Gallia County in the Ohio General Assembly. From 1978 to 1980 she was an assistant Gallipolis city solicitor and she then served four consecutive terms as a state representative. During her service, she continued to work at the law firm Cowles & Boster C., LPA.

== Education ==
Boster received both her Bachelor of Science (1973) and Juris Doctor (1976) from Ohio State University.

== Awards ==
In 1983, she received the Gallipolis Business and Professional Women's Club Woman of the Year award; Boster was also the recipient of the Ohio Association of County Boards of MR/DD Legislator of the Year and the Leadership Award from the Ohio Developmental Disabilities Planning Council.
