= Jim Mason (Ohio politician) =

American politician (born 1948)

Member of the Ohio House of Representatives from the 25th district
- In office January 4, 1993 – May 1, 1998
- Preceded by: Helen Rankin
- Succeeded by: David Goodman

Personal details
- Born: August 5, 1948 (age 77)
- Party: Republican

James W. Mason (born August 5, 1948) is an American politician who served as a Republican member of the Ohio House of Representatives from 1993 to 1998.
