= Larry Adams (politician) =

American politician

Member of the Ohio House of Representatives from the 86th district
- In office January 2, 1987 – December 31, 1990
- Preceded by: Walter McClaskey
- Succeeded by: Randy Weston

Personal details
- Party: Republican

Larry Adams is an American politician and a former member of the Ohio House of Representatives.

Larry Adams served two terms as a State Representative, representing the 86th District. Prior, he was a commissioner for Marion County. Currently, he is a representative for the USDA.
