= Marilyn Reid =

American politician

Member of the Ohio House of Representatives from the 76th district
- In office January 3, 1993 – December 31, 1998
- Preceded by: Bob Doyle
- Succeeded by: Steve Austria

Personal details
- Born: August 14, 1941 (age 84) Chicago, Illinois
- Party: Republican

Marilyn Reid is a Republican politician who formerly served in the Ohio General Assembly. An attorney from Beavercreek, Ohio, Reid initially ran for the Ohio House of Representatives in 1992, seeking to win a primary election against Bob Doyle. She defeated Doyle in the primary, and subsequently won the fall general election. She was seated on January 3, 1993, and would be reelected in 1994 and 1996.

In 1998 she lost a primary election to Steve Austria, a financial planner.

By 2002, Reid had made a political comeback to serve as Greene County Commissioner, winning a crowded Republican primary to take the seat in 2003. In 2012, Reid was defeated in the Republican primary to retain her seat by Tom Koogler.
