= John Bender (Ohio politician) =

American politician (1938–2018)

Member of the Ohio House of Representatives from the 62nd district
- In office January 3, 1993 – December 31, 2000
- Preceded by: John Bara
- Succeeded by: Jeffrey Manning

Personal details
- Born: December 14, 1938 Pittsburgh, Pennsylvania, U.S.
- Died: February 2, 2018 (aged 79) Westlake, Ohio, U.S.
- Party: Democratic

John R. Bender Jr. (December 14, 1938 – February 2, 2018) was an American politician who served as a Democratic member of the Ohio House of Representatives from 1993 to 2000. His district consisted of a portion of Lorain County, Ohio. He was succeeded by Jeffrey Manning. Bender was previously an at-large member of the Elyria, Ohio city council. After leaving the state house he served as a member of the Ohio Democratic Party State Central Committee. He served on the Ohio State Board of Education from 2007-2010. A 1956 graduate of Pittsburgh Central Catholic High School, he earned his B.S. in 1960, his master's in 1962, and his Ph.D. in 1969 from the University of Pittsburgh. He was employed as an educator, serving as the director of student activities at University of Pittsburgh, Penn State New Kensington and LCCC. Bender was an outplacement and retraining counselor and consultant. He was also a delegate for Democratic National Conventions in 1984, 1988, and 2004. He died February 2, 2018.
