= Don Mottley =

American politician

Member of the Ohio House of Representatives from the 41st district
- In office January 3, 1993 – December 31, 2000
- Preceded by: Bob Hickey
- Succeeded by: Jon Husted

Personal details
- Party: Republican
- Height: 1.72 m (5 ft 8 in)

Don Mottley was a member of the Ohio House of Representatives from 1993 to 2000. His district consisted of a portion of Montgomery County, Ohio. He was succeeded by Jon Husted. Mottley currently works at a law firm in Ohio.
