= William L. Ogg =

American politician (1937–2020)

Bill Ogg

Member of the Ohio House of Representatives from the 89th district
- In office January 3, 1995 – December 31, 2002
- Preceded by: Vern Riffe
- Succeeded by: Todd Book

Personal details
- Born: May 17, 1937 Portsmouth, Ohio, U.S.
- Died: September 10, 2020 (aged 83) Portsmouth, Ohio, U.S.
- Party: Democratic

William Lynn Ogg (May 17, 1937 – September 10, 2020) was a member of the Ohio House of Representatives from 1995 to 2002. He also served on the Scioto County Commission and on the Portsmouth City Council. His district consisted of Scioto County, Ohio. He was succeeded in 2003 by Todd Book.

His son, William K. Ogg, is the Scioto County treasurer and both are members of the Scioto County Democratic Party Hall of Fame.
