= Jon D. Myers =

American politician

Member of the Ohio House of Representatives from the 6th district
- In office January 3, 1991 – December 31, 2000
- Preceded by: Steve Williams
- Succeeded by: Tim Schaffer

Personal details
- Party: Republican

Jon D. Myers is an American politician. As of 2013, he is a lobbyist for the Community Bankers Association of Ohio, and was a member of the Ohio House of Representatives from 1991 to 2000. His district consisted of a portion of Licking County, Ohio. He was succeeded by Tim Schaffer.
