= Sally Perz =

American politician

Member of the Ohio House of Representatives from the 52nd district
- In office January 3, 1993–September 14, 1999
- Preceded by: Don Czarcinski
- Succeeded by: Jim Mettler

Personal details
- Party: Republican

Sally Perz is an American politician who was a member of the Ohio House of Representatives, serving from 1993 to 1999.

== Career ==
Beginning as a defender for women's rights, Perz's advocacy eventually led to politics. She later served as a business consultant. In 1992, she decided to run for a term in the Ohio House of Representatives and faced Don Czarcinski, a troubled incumbent. She ended up defeating Czarcinski to take her first term, and was reelected in 1994, 1996, and 1998. She resigned from the House in 1999 to pursue other ventures, and was succeeded by Jim Mettler.
