= Ray Sines =

American politician

Member of the Ohio House of Representatives from the 69th district
- In office January 3, 1989-December 31, 1996
- Preceded by: Robert Hagan
- Succeeded by: Ron Young

Personal details
- Party: Republican

Ray Sines was a member of the Ohio House of Representatives. He served from 1989 to 1996.
