= Corwin M. Nixon =

American politician

Corwin Nixon
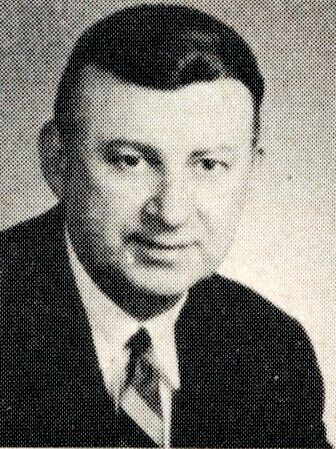

Member of the Ohio House of Representatives from the 84th district
- In office January 3, 1967-December 31, 1992
- Preceded by: District Created
- Succeeded by: George E. Terwilleger

Personal details
- Born: March 5, 1913 near Red Lion, Ohio, US
- Died: November 6, 2003 (aged 90) Dayton, Ohio, US
- Party: Republican

Corwin M. Nixon (March 5, 1913 – November 6, 2003) was an American politician.

== Political life ==
Born one mile south of Red Lion, Ohio, Nixon was best known as an Ohio politician from Lebanon, Ohio. He served as Warren County Commissioner from 1950–1962, and was then elected to the Ohio House of Representatives in 1962, a post he maintained for 30 years until his retirement in 1992. Nixon rose to Minority Leader of the Republican Party in the Ohio House, holding the position longer than any other minority Leader from 1979-1992.

Much of Corwin's status stemmed from his close relationship to Ohio House Speaker Vern Riffe. In 1988, Riffe was quoted by The Cincinnati Enquirer as saying, "I don't have any brother. Corwin is how I look at a brother I never had." His relationship with Speaker Riffe, a Democrat, caused some consternation with the conservative wing of the Republican members of the Ohio House, however, his relationship gave him tremendous influence as a Republican.

== Personal life ==
Nixon also had a passion for Standardbred horse racing. He was manager and part owner of Lebanon Raceway in Lebanon, Ohio, a breeder, trainer and driver. He was inducted into the Harness Racing Museum & Hall of Fame in Goshen, New York. in 1992, and the Little Brown Jug Wall of Fame in 1994. He also served as president of the United States Trotting Association.

== Awards and honors ==
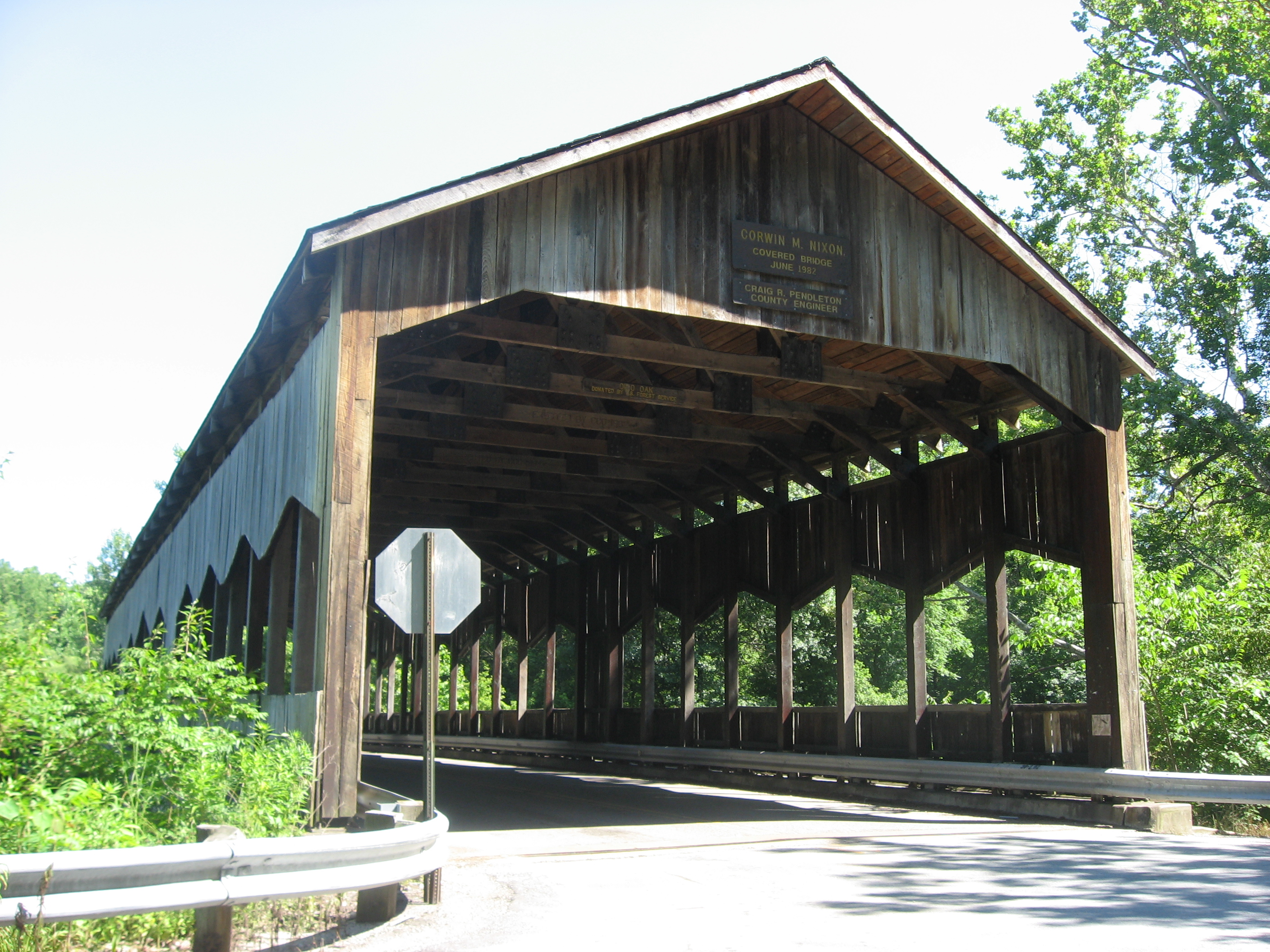
Western end of the Corwin Nixon Covered Bridge

- Ohio Harness Racing Hall of Fame.
- Honorary Doctor of Law, Ohio University.
- Ohio State Fair Hall of Fame, 1980.
- Corwin M. Nixon Aviation Facility, Great Oaks Joint Vocational School, 1986.
- Corwin M. Nixon Covered Bridge, Waynesville, Ohio, 1982.
- Corwin M. Nixon Park, Mason, Ohio.
- Corwin M. Nixon Bridge, Franklin, Ohio.
- Corwin M. Nixon Aquatic Center, Miami University, Oxford, Ohio 1994.
- Board of Trustees Bethesda Hospital and Grandview Hospitals,
- Corwin M. Nixon Health Center, Lebanon, Ohio October 30, 2008.
- Corwin M. Nixon Community Health Center, Dayton, Ohio.
- Ohio University Phillips Award, for his role in establishing the Ohio University School of Osteopathic Medicine.
