= Don Czarcinski =

American politician

Member of the Ohio House of Representatives from the 46th district
- In office November 30, 1983-December 31, 1992
- Preceded by: Arthur Wilkowski
- Succeeded by: Sally Perz

Personal details
- Born: 1947 or 1948 (age 78–79)
- Party: Democratic

Don Czarcinski is a former member of the Ohio House of Representatives. He is of Polish descent.
