= Tom Seese =

American politician

- In office May 21, 1986 – December 31, 1994
- Preceded by: Bob Nettle
- Succeeded by: Twyla Roman

Member of the Ohio House of Representatives from the 48th district

Personal details
- Born: 1943 or 1944 (age 81–82)

Tom Seese is a former member of the Ohio House of Representatives.
