= Rick Rench =

American politician

Richard Rench

Member of the Ohio House of Representatives from the 90th district
- In office January 3, 1983 – December 31, 1992
- Preceded by: Larry Hughes
- Succeeded by: District eliminated

Personal details
- Born: May 3, 1941 Findlay, Ohio
- Died: November 3, 2008 (aged 67) Akron, Ohio
- Party: Republican

Richard E. Rench was a member of the Ohio House of Representatives from 1983 to 1992.
