= Bob Hickey =

American politician

Robert E. Hickey, Jr.

Member of the Ohio House of Representatives from the 39th district
- In office January 3, 1982 – December 31, 1992
- Preceded by: Tom Fries
- Succeeded by: Don Mottley

Personal details
- Born: Dayton, OH
- Party: Democratic Party (United States)
- Profession: Attorney at Law; Vice President of Public Affairs at Wright State University

Robert E. Hickey, Jr. is a former member of the Ohio House of Representatives.
