= John Stozich =

American politician

Member of the Ohio House of Representatives from the 86th district
- In office January 3, 1983 – December 31, 1992
- Preceded by: District Relocated from Lucas County
- Succeeded by: Chuck Brading

Personal details
- Born: May 9, 1927 Mingo Junction, Ohio, United States
- Died: July 5, 2004 (aged 77) Findlay, Ohio, United States
- Party: Republican

John Paul Stozich (1927–2004) was a member of the Ohio House of Representatives. His district consisted of an area circled around Findlay, Ohio. He was succeeded by Chuck Brading. In the House, he served as chair of the Health and Retirement Committee.

He also served as mayor of Findlay, Ohio.

Stozich pleaded no contest to vehicular manslaughter after he ran a stop sign in January 2004 and killed a 35-year-old mother of four.
