= Chuck Red Ash =

American politician and basketball coach

Member of the Ohio House of Representatives from the 49th district
- In office January 3, 1979-December 31, 1990
- Preceded by: Robert Regula
- Succeeded by: Johnnie Maier Jr.

Personal details
- Born: December 28, 1915
- Died: March 3, 1991 (aged 75) Canton, Ohio
- Party: Republican

Charles E. "Red" Ash (December 28, 1915 – March 3, 1991) was an Ohio Republican Party politician and a member of the Ohio General Assembly. Ash became a well known local as the head basketball coach for Canton South High School for almost forty years. He was among the most successful coaches, evidenced by his 634-200 won-loss record. His 1948 team reached the final four after winning two regional games by a combined 95-45 points. By the end of his tenure as coach, he had been the winningest coach in high school basketball history. However, after a knee injury prevented him from coaching, Ash entered politics.

Ash decided to run against newly appointed Representative Robert Regula in 1978, and won handily. He won reelection five times, and retired in 1990. A year later, he died, at the age of 75. Posthumously the gymnasium at Canton South High School has been named the Charles Red Ash Gymnasium.
