= Marc Guthrie =

American politician (born 1952)

Member of the Ohio House of Representatives from the 71st district
- In office January 3, 1983 – December 31, 1994
- Preceded by: Eugene Branstool
- Succeeded by: Jay Hottinger

Personal details
- Born: February 8, 1952 (age 74)
- Party: Democratic

Marc Guthrie (born February 8, 1952) is a Democratic politician who formerly served in the Ohio General Assembly. Guthrie began his political career as a member of the Heath, Ohio City Council, and went on to serve six years as a Licking County, Ohio Commissioner. When Eugene Branstool opted to give up his seat in Ohio House of Representatives to run for the Ohio Senate, Guthrie entered the race to succeed him. He was successful, and was sworn into office on January 3, 1983. He won reelection to the Ohio House five times.

In 1990, there was much speculation that Congress, however he opted to again run for his seat in the Statehouse. Soon after, he became assistant majority whip in the House. He won a sixth term in 1992.

In 1994, Guthrie announced that he would forgo a seventh term in the House to run for the Ohio Senate, opting to take on newly appointed Senator Nancy Dix. With the year being overwhelmingly Republican, Guthrie lost for the first time, ending his career as a state legislator after twelve years.

Guthrie opted to return to politics in 2000, by running for Congress against Congressman Bob Ney. With a colorful campaign including support from Jerry Springer, Guthrie provided Ney with a contested race. In the end, Ney received 64% of the vote to Guthrie's 36%. Following his Congressional defeat, Guthrie returned to Newark where he opted to run for Newark City Council. He ended up serving on the council from 2003 to 2009, and again from 2011 to 2015.
