= Ed Kasputis =

American politician (born 1961)

Member of the Ohio House of Representatives from the 16th district
- In office January 3, 1991 – December 31, 1998
- Preceded by: Jim Petro
- Succeeded by: Sally Conway Kilbane

Personal details
- Born: April 21, 1961 (age 65) Ashtabula, Ohio, U.S.
- Party: Republican

Edward Kasputis (born April 21, 1961) is an American Republican politician who served as member of the Ohio House of Representatives from 1991 to 1998. He ran for the office of Ohio's Secretary of State but was unsuccessful. He conducted a campaign focused on getting more born-again Christians involved in politics. He launched a brief bid for Ohio Secretary of State in 1998 but did not receive the support of state Republican party leadership.

After leaving active political life, Kasputis started Baseballphd.net, an Internet social network that describes itself as "offering baseball fans a place to participate in podcasts, learn more about baseball and each Major League City, offer travel suggestions and receive help from our trained staff on planning their next trip."

Kasputis also operates his own law firm, Kasputis Law, LLC in Middleburg Heights, Ohio.
