= Larry Manahan =

American politician

Member of the Ohio House of Representatives from the 79th district
- In office January 1, 1979-December 31, 1992
- Preceded by: Fred Hadley
- Succeeded by: Richard Hodges

Personal details
- Born: September 27, 1928 Defiance, Ohio, United States
- Died: March 30, 2002 (aged 73) Cleveland, Ohio, United States
- Party: Republican

William Lawrence "Larry" Manahan (September 27, 1928 – March 30, 2002) was a former member of the Ohio House of Representatives, serving from 1977 to 1992. He represented the 79th District, which encompassed the North-Westernmost area of Ohio. A fiscal and social conservative, he often voted against subsidies and tax increases. However, he was in favor of green energy solutions decades before they were popular. In 1992, Manahan opted to not run for reelection.
