= John Bara =

American politician (1926–2012)

Member of the Ohio House of Representatives from the 54th district
- In office January 3, 1983 – December 31, 1992
- Preceded by: Marguerite Bowman
- Succeeded by: John Bender
- In office January 3, 1977 – December 31, 1980
- Preceded by: Scribner Fauver
- Succeeded by: Marguerite Bowman

Personal details
- Born: November 26, 1926 Elyria, Ohio, US
- Died: November 23, 2012 (aged 85) Elyria, Ohio, US
- Party: Democratic

John Valentine Bara (November 26, 1926 – November 23, 2012) is a former member of the Ohio House of Representatives.
