= Don Gilmore =

American politician

Member of the Ohio House of Representatives from the 33rd district
- In office January 3, 1979-December 31, 1990
- Preceded by: Mack Pemberton
- Succeeded by: Richard Cordray

Personal details
- Born: September 26, 1928 Ohio, U.S.
- Died: October 15, 2003 (aged 75) Columbus, Ohio, U.S.
- Party: Republican

Donald Eugene Gilmore (September 26, 1928 – October 15, 2003) was a member of the Ohio House of Representatives. He also served as the Franklin County Deputy Sheriff and with the Dublin, Ohio police department. He also owned a security company. Gilmore was a Freemason.
