= Wayne Jones (politician) =

American politician (1954–2019)

Member of the Ohio House of Representatives from the 46th district
- In office January 6, 1988 – December 31, 1996
- Preceded by: Vernon Cook
- Succeeded by: Kevin Coughlin

Personal details
- Born: July 28, 1954 Cuyahoga Falls, Ohio, U.S.
- Died: November 23, 2019 (aged 65) Akron, Ohio, U.S.
- Party: Democratic
- Education: University of Akron
- Profession: lawyer

Wayne Martin Jones (July 28, 1954 – November 23, 2019) was an American politician and member of the Ohio House of Representatives. He died in 2019 from Parkinson's disease.
