= Ron Suster =

American politician and judge (1942–2024)

Judge of the Cuyahoga County Court of Common Pleas
- In office October 5, 1995 – October 31, 2012
- Appointed by: George Voinovich

Member of the Ohio House of Representatives from the 14th district
- In office January 3, 1993 – October 5, 1995
- Preceded by: C. J. Prentiss
- Succeeded by: Ed Jerse

Member of the Ohio House of Representatives from the 19th district
- In office January 3, 1983 – January 3, 1993
- Preceded by: Dale Van Vyven
- Succeeded by: Patrick Sweeney

Member of the Ohio House of Representatives from the 18th district
- In office January 3, 1981 – January 3, 1983
- Preceded by: Dennis Eckart
- Succeeded by: Judy Sheerer

Personal details
- Born: Ronald Joseph Suster; October 31, 1942 Cleveland, Ohio, U.S.
- Died: January 15, 2024 (aged 81) Euclid, Ohio, U.S.
- Party: Democratic
- Spouse: Patricia Hocevar (m. 1974)
- Children: 3
- Education: Case Western Reserve University (BA, JD)
- Occupation: Lawyer; politician; judge

Ronald Joseph Suster (October 31, 1942 – January 15, 2024) was an American jurist and politician who served in the Ohio House of Representatives from 1981 until 1995, and as a Common Pleas judge in Cuyahoga County from 1995 until 2012.

== Early life and education ==
Ronald Joseph Suster was born on October 31, 1942, in Cleveland, Ohio, to Joseph Suster Jr. (1909–1959) and Frances Pryatel (1906–1997). His grandparents and father were first-generation immigrants from Slovenia. He attended Villa Angela–St. Joseph High School, a Catholic college-preparatory school in North Collinwood, Cleveland, and was later inducted into its Hall of Fame in 1992.

Suster attended Western Reserve University, receiving a Bachelor of Arts degree in history and economics in 1964. He then earned a Doctorate of Jurisprudence from Case Western Reserve University School of Law in 1967, and was elected to their Society of Benchers. (Note: In 1967, the separate schools of Western Reserve University and Case Institute of Technology formally merged into one school named Case Western Reserve University.) While at the law school, he worked in the U.S. Postal Service on nights and weekends. He was admitted to the Ohio State Bar in 1967, and was in private general practice from 1970 until he became a judge in 1995. He was an Assistant Law Director for the City of Cleveland, an Assistant Cuyahoga County Prosecutor, and a bar examiner for the state of Ohio.

Suster was a member of the Ohio State Bar Association. He served as a Special Assistant Ohio Attorney General from 1971 to 1980, under William J. Brown.

== Career in government ==
Suster was elected to the 114th Ohio House of Representatives in 1980 as a member of the Democratic Party, representing the 18th district. He took his seat in 1981. He was reelected in 1982 representing the 19th district, due to redistricting after the 1980 United States census. He retained that seat until 1993, when he won election in the 14th district. During his tenure in the House of Representatives, he served as chairman of four House committees: House Ethics (1983–84), Civil & Commercial Law (1985–86), Financial Institutions (1987–90), and Judiciary & Criminal Justice (1993–94). All four districts he served in were located in eastern Cuyahoga County.

In 1995, he resigned from the House of Representatives when he was appointed to the Cuyahoga County Court of Common Pleas by Governor George Voinovich. He was a judge in the court's General Division until his mandatory retirement at age 70 in 2012, though he occasionally was assigned to adjudicate further cases. Among other notable cases, he presided over the 2000 wrongful imprisonment civil case regarding the late Dr. Sam Sheppard.

Suster was the Democratic candidate in the 1998 Ohio Supreme Court election. He received 781,103 votes, but lost to the incumbent Republican Paul Pfeifer (who received 1,947,916 votes).

== Personal life and death ==
Suster married Patricia Hocevar on July 19, 1974, at St. Paschal Baylon Parish in Highland Heights, Ohio. They have three children and seven grandchildren.

Ron Suster died on January 15, 2024, at the age of 81. He is buried at All Souls Cemetery in Chardon, Ohio.
