= Steve Williams (politician) =

American politician

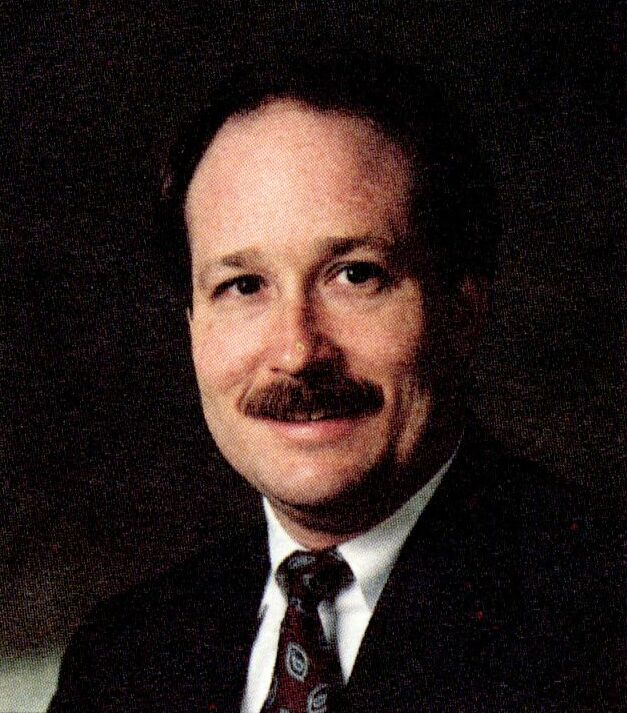

Member of the Ohio Senate from the 31st district
- In office January 3, 1991 – December 31, 1993
- Preceded by: Eugene Branstool
- Succeeded by: Nancy Dix

Member of the Ohio House of Representatives from the 78th district
- In office January 3, 1981 – December 31, 1990
- Preceded by: Don Maddux
- Succeeded by: Jon D. Myers

Personal details
- Born: Steven Orville Williams; May 24, 1951 (age 75) Columbus, Ohio, U.S.
- Party: Republican

Steven Orville Williams (born May 24, 1951) is an American politician and current judge in Fairfield County, Ohio. He formerly served as the state Senator of the 31st District, from 1991 to 1993.
