= Sam Bateman =

American politician

Member of the Ohio House of Representatives from the 71st district
- In office January 3, 1985-December 31, 2000
- Preceded by: Sue Fisher
- Succeeded by: Jean Schmidt

Personal details
- Born: June 11, 1936 Cincinnati, Ohio, United States
- Died: January 21, 2001 (aged 64) Cincinnati, Ohio, United States
- Party: Republican

Samuel Thomas Bateman was a member of the Ohio House of Representatives from 1985 until 2000, when he was forced by term limits to step down. His district consisted of a portion of Adams County, Ohio. He was succeeded by Jean Schmidt.
