= Mike Shoemaker =

American politician (born 1945)

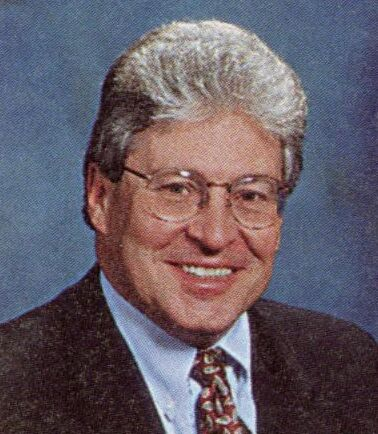

Member of the Ohio Senate from the 17th district
- In office February 5, 1997 – December 31, 2002
- Preceded by: Jan Michael Long
- Succeeded by: John Carey

Member of the Ohio House of Representatives from the 91st district
- In office January 3, 1983 – February 8, 1997
- Preceded by: Myrl Shoemaker
- Succeeded by: Joseph P. Sulzer

Personal details
- Born: 1945 (age 80–81) Nipgen, Ohio, U.S.
- Party: Democratic

Michael C. Shoemaker (born 1945) is an American politician of the Democratic Party. He was born in 1945 in Nipgen, Ohio (Ross County). Shoemaker's father, Myrl Shoemaker, was Lieutenant Governor of Ohio.

Shoemaker received a Bachelor of Science in education from Capital University in Columbus, Ohio, and a Master of Education from Xavier University in Cincinnati, Ohio. He began his 10-year teaching career as a math instructor and football coach in Southern Ohio. In 1977, he left education and started his own home construction business. In 1982, he was elected to the Ohio House of Representatives.

Shoemaker served from 1983 to 1997 in the Ohio House of Representatives after his father was elected lieutenant governor in 1982. He was appointed to the Ohio Senate in 1997. In 2002, his district was made significantly more Republican in redistricting, and he was defeated by State Representative John Carey. While a legislator, Shoemaker opposed school vouchers and supported greater accountability for homeschooling. He also sponsored legislation that led to the creation of the Ohio Department of Aging.

Shoemaker was appointed executive director of the Ohio School Facilities Commission by Ohio Governor Ted Strickland in February 2007. While a member of the Ohio General Assembly, Shoemaker opposed the creation of the OSFC, although he served for five years as a non-voting member from 1995 to 2000.

Shoemaker and his wife Kathy currently live near Circleville, Ohio.
