= Bill Schuck =

American politician (born 1951)

Member of the Ohio House of Representatives from the 35th district
- In office January 2, 1987 – December 31, 2000
- Preceded by: Dana Deshler
- Succeeded by: Larry Wolpert

Personal details
- Born: December 12, 1951 (age 74) Findlay, Ohio, U.S.
- Party: Republican

William Schuck (born December 12, 1951) is an American politician who served as a Republican member of the Ohio House of Representatives from 1987 to 2000.
