= Eugene Branstool =

American politician

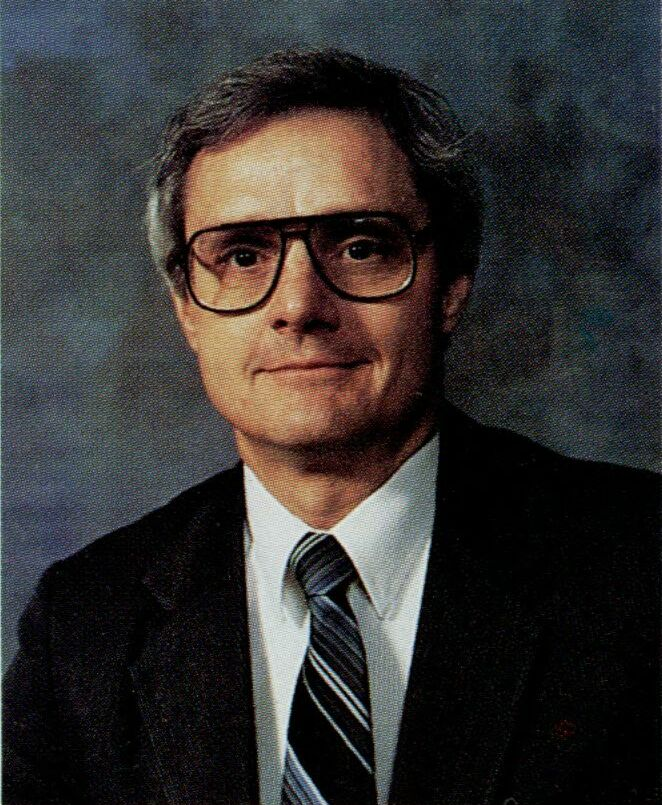

Member of the Ohio Senate from the 31st district
- In office January 3, 1983 – December 31, 1990
- Preceded by: Tim McCormack
- Succeeded by: Steven O. Williams

Member of the Ohio House of Representatives from the 1st district
- In office January 3, 1975 – December 31, 1982
- Preceded by: Raymond Luther
- Succeeded by: Marc Guthrie

Personal details
- Born: December 13, 1936 (age 89) Mount Vernon, Ohio, U.S.
- Party: Democratic

Charles Eugene Branstool (born December 13, 1936) is an American politician from Ohio. He was a member of the Ohio House of Representatives from 1975 to 1982 and the Ohio Senate from 1983 to 1990 and part of the Democratic Party. He was originally a farmer from Utica, Ohio, and defeated Republican Raymond Luther in 1974 for his Ohio House seat. He won reelection in 1976, 1978, and 1980.

== Career ==
Following redistricting in 1982, Branstool opted to make a run for the Ohio Senate, running for a newly drawn district against Sam Speck, whose home had been drawn out of his former district. One of the most contested races of that cycle, Branstool defeated Speck, who ultimately returned to his old district, which wasn't up for reelection. In 1986, Branstool was mentioned as a potential candidate for Ohio Lieutenant Governor, running with Governor Richard Celeste. However, this never went forward. He went on to win reelection to his Senate seat in a slim margin. Soon after, he was elected Senate minority whip by his colleagues.

In 1990, Branstool was chosen as the running mate of Democratic gubernatorial nominee Tony Celebrezze, who lost the election to George Voinovich. Following the defeat, Branstool opted to become Chairman of the Ohio Democratic Party, and succeeded. He would serve in the capacity until 1993, when he stepped down and was replaced by Harry Meshel.

Branstool went on to serve under President Bill Clinton as an assistant Secretary of Agriculture. However, he would only serve in the capacity for seven months, citing his desires to return home. However, he soon was appointed to the Federal Agricultural Mortgage Corporation's Board of Trustees.

In a surprise move, Branstool opted to run in 1998 against Jay Hottinger for his former seat in the Senate. However, he lost in what was now a solidly Republican district. He since has retired to Utica.

Branstool made a return to the news in 2011 as an opponent of new legislation to curb collective bargaining. “An individual worker who does his 40 hours or whatever, it’s hard for him to represent himself alone, and this is a way that he can do that – and sometimes they need leaders,” Branstool said. “Other elements of our society, whether it’s the pharmaceutical companies, the banks, the insurance companies, payday lenders, all these guys have people looking after their interests. And this is a way that working people have a chance to look after theirs.”

== See also ==
- Ohio gubernatorial elections
- Ohio lieutenant gubernatorial elections

Party political offices
Preceded by Paul Leonard	Democratic nominee for Lieutenant Governor of Ohio; 1990	Succeeded by Peter Lawson Jones
