= Jacquelyn K. O'Brien =

American politician (1931–2013)

Jackie O'Brien

Member of the Ohio House of Representatives from the 37th district
- In office May 7, 1985-December 31, 2000
- Preceded by: John O'Brien
- Succeeded by: Tom Brinkman Jr.

Personal details
- Born: July 23, 1931
- Died: November 19, 2013 (aged 82) Cincinnati, Ohio, U.S.
- Party: Republican

Jacquelyn Kirtley O'Brien (July 23, 1931 – November 19, 2013) was a Republican member of the Ohio House of Representatives from 1985 to 2001. Her district consisted of a portion of southeastern Hamilton County, Ohio. She was succeeded by Tom Brinkman Jr., also a Republican.

== Political career ==
Appointed in 1985 to complete the unexpired term left by the death of her husband, state Rep. John O'Brien, Jackie O'Brien was elected to a full term in 1986 and served eight terms in the Ohio House of Representatives. She was a close affiliate of state Rep. Jo Ann Davidson, who was Speaker of the Ohio House from 1995 until her retirement in January 2001.

O'Brien chaired the House Housing and Urban Affairs Committee, and she served on several other House committees, including Townships and Elections, Children and Youth, Human Resources, Veterans Affairs, State Government, and Finance and Appropriations.

She and her husband were instrumental in forming the first Anderson Township Library Committee in Hamilton County in 1980 and has remained involved with the group. She was appointed to a five-year term on the Ohio State Library Board in February 2005 and retired in 2009.

O'Brien was inducted into the National Senior Citizens Hall of Fame, was named Anderson Township Citizen of the Year in 2001 and has received numerous awards, including the Council of PTA Services to Children award and the Ohio AMVETS Legislative Award. .

== Personal life ==
O'Brien lived in Anderson Township, a suburb of Cincinnati in southeastern Hamilton County, Ohio. John and Jackie O'Brien had three children: John Todd O'Brien (1958), Holly O. Saunders and Heather O. Krombholz.

Jackie O'Brien died in November 2013.
