= Nancy Dix =

American politician

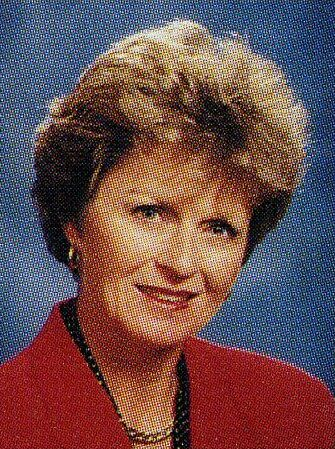

Member of the Ohio Senate from the 31st district
- In office January 4, 1994 – February 20, 1998
- Preceded by: Steven O. Williams
- Succeeded by: Jay Hottinger

Personal details
- Born: Nancy Chiles Dix
- Party: Republican

Nancy Chiles Dix is a former member of the Ohio Senate, where she served the 31st District from 1994 to 1998.
