= Stan Aronoff =

American politician (1932–2024)

Stanley Aronoff
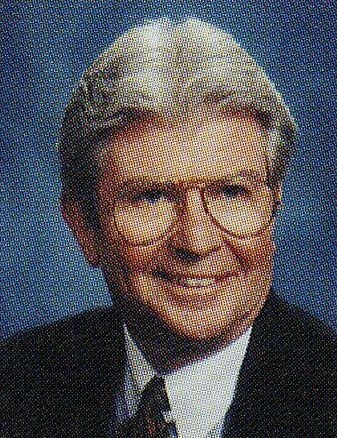

89th President of the Ohio Senate
- In office January 3, 1989 – December 31, 1996
- Preceded by: Paul Gillmor
- Succeeded by: Richard Finan

Member of the Ohio Senate from the 8th district
- In office January 3, 1967 – December 31, 1996
- Preceded by: District Created
- Succeeded by: Lou Blessing

Personal details
- Born: June 8, 1932 Cincinnati, Ohio, U.S.
- Died: January 31, 2024 (aged 91) Cincinnati, Ohio, U.S.
- Party: Republican

Stanley J. Aronoff (June 8, 1932 – January 31, 2024) was an American politician of the Republican Party who served for a time as president of the Ohio Senate.

== Biography ==
Stanley J. Aronoff was born on June 8, 1932. He was raised in a Jewish family in the North Avondale neighborhood of Cincinnati and attended high school at Walnut Hills High School. He earned a bachelor's degree and a law degree from Harvard University, after which he returned to Cincinnati to enter into the private practice of law.

In 1960, Ambrose Lindhorst (the head of the Hamilton County Republican Party), Walton Bachrach (mayor of Cincinnati), and Republican operative George Eyrich persuaded Aronoff to run for a seat in the Ohio General Assembly. He began serving in the Ohio House of Representatives in 1961 and was re-elected twice, serving until 1967.

In 1966, Aronoff won a seat in the Ohio Senate. He was reelected in 1968 and 1972. In the 1974 primary election, he made an unsuccessful bid for the Republican nomination for Ohio Attorney General. He was re-elected to the Senate in 1976.

In 1978, Aronoff sought the party's nomination for a seat in the United States House of Representatives, but party bosses endorsed television news broadcaster Thearon "Tom" Atkins instead. It was suspected, with the Jewish Bill Gradison already representing the Hamilton County Republican Party in Congress, that party leaders shied away from endorsing another Jew for Cincinnati's other congressional seat. Nevertheless, Aronoff prevailed in the Republican primary, but lost narrowly in the general election to Democrat Tom Luken.

By the 1980 elections, the Republican party achieved a majority in the Ohio Senate, and Aronoff was named chairman of the Finance Committee. However, the party was again in the minority two years later. In the 1984 campaign, Aronoff's success at fundraising was key to the Republican recapture of the Senate. The Senate Republican leader was Paul Gillmor; when Gillmor won a seat in Congress in 1988, Aronoff became President of the state Senate.

In 1995, Aronoff—and other legislators, including former Democratic Ohio House of Representatives Speaker Vern Riffe—was investigated for the misdemeanor of accepting multiple low fees from more than one source for the same event in order to avoid disclosure ("fee pancaking", like a stack of pancakes); the law required that legislators disclose the acceptance of any speaking fee exceeding US$500. Aronoff was indicted and pleaded guilty to not disclosing $4,500 in fees for the same speech accepted from various arms of The Limited company. He was sentenced to community service, which he fulfilled by giving lectures to students on government ethics.

In 1996 Aronoff retired from public service. He was connected with the law firm of Aronoff, Rosen and Hunt, established in 1928 by Irwin I. Aronoff.

Aronoff died on January 31, 2024, at the age of 91.

== See also ==
- Ohio's 2nd congressional district
