= Jo Ann Davidson =

American politician (1927–2024)

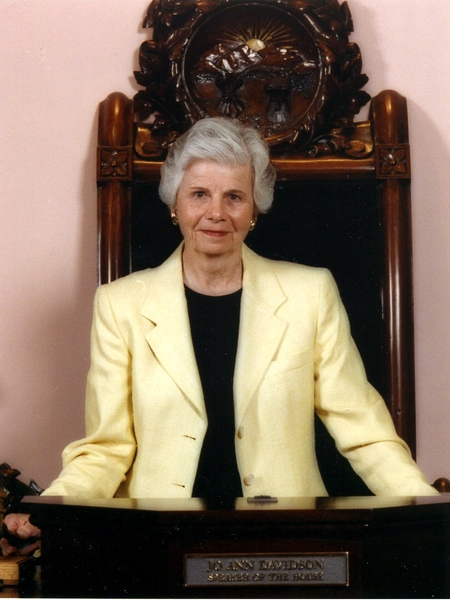

Republican National Committeewoman from Ohio
- In office 2005 – April 29, 2024
- Succeeded by: Jane Timken

97th Speaker of the Ohio House of Representatives
- In office January 3, 1995 – December 31, 2000
- Preceded by: Vern Riffe
- Succeeded by: Larry Householder
Ohio House positions
Minority Leader of the Ohio House of Representatives
In office January 5, 1993 – January 3, 1995
Preceded by	Corwin M. Nixon
Succeeded by	Patrick Sweeney
Minority Whip of the Ohio House of Representatives
In office January 3, 1987 – January 5, 1993
Preceded by	David Johnson
Succeeded by	Randy Gardner

Member of the Ohio House of Representatives from the 24th district
- In office January 3, 1981 – December 31, 2000
- Preceded by: Alan Eugene Norris
- Succeeded by: Larry L. Flowers

Personal details
- Born: September 28, 1927 Findlay, Ohio, U.S.
- Died: October 25, 2024 (aged 97)
- Party: Republican

Jo Ann Davidson (September 28, 1927 – October 25, 2024) was an American politician of the Republican Party. A member of the Ohio House of Representatives from 1981 to 2000, she was its first female Speaker, from 1995 to 2000, and also served as co-chair of the Republican National Committee.

== Early life and education ==
Jo Ann Benington was born in Findlay, Ohio on September 28, 1927, and raised in Atlanta until her father's death in 1939, when the family returned to Findlay; she finished high school there in 1945.

== Career ==
Davidson worked for the Findlay Chamber of Commerce after high school. After moving to Reynoldsburg with her husband, in 1971 she became a research associate at the Ohio Chamber of Commerce, where she eventually became Director of Legislative Services and Vice President of Special Programs.

In 1967 she was elected on her second try to the Reynoldsburg city council, where she served until 1977 and chaired the Finance Committee. In 1978 she was elected Clerk of Truro Township. In 1980, she was then elected to the Ohio House of Representatives. In 1985 she was elected assistant minority whip, subsequently advancing to minority whip and minority leader. When the Republicans gained a majority in 1994, she was elected as the first female Speaker of the House and served in that position until 2001, when she retired from the legislature due to term limits.

In Republican party politics, Davidson was a long-time member of the Franklin County Republican Central Committee, becoming its chair in 1973, served on the National Republican Platform Committee in 1976, and from 2005 to 2009 was co-chair of the Republican National Committee.

In 2001, after her retirement from the legislature, Davidson became interim director of the Ohio Department of Job and Family Services. She was appointed by Governor John R. Kasich as chair of the first Ohio Casino Control Commission in February 2011, serving until February 2018. She was also vice-chair of the Ohio Turnpike Commission, and a member of the Franklin County Mental Health Board. She founded and was president of JAD Associates, a public policy and political consulting firm. In 2000 she founded the Jo Ann Davidson Ohio Leadership Institute, which provides leadership training to Republican women, and she personally advised many women.

== Personal life and death ==
Davidson was married to John Davidson in 1949. They had two daughters, one of whom predeceased her. She died on October 25, 2024, at the age of 97.

== Honors ==
Davidson won awards including the United Conservatives of Ohio's Outstanding Legislator and Watchdog of the Treasury awards, the 1991 Legislator of the Year of the National Republican Legislators Association, and the YWCA Woman of Achievement award. She was inducted into the Ohio Women's Hall of Fame in 1991 and was awarded honorary degrees by Ohio University, Bowling Green State University, Capital University, and The Ohio State University.

The Capitol Theatre in the Vern Riffe State Office Tower in Columbus, Ohio was renamed in her honor in 2016.

== See also ==
- List of female speakers of legislatures in the United States

Ohio House of Representatives
Preceded by Alan Norris	Member of the Ohio House of Representatives from the 24th district 1981–2000	Succeeded by Larry Flowers
