= Frank Sawyer (Ohio politician) =

American politician

Member of the Ohio House of Representatives from the 64th district
- In office January 3, 1983 – September 16, 1998
- Preceded by: Sherrod Brown
- Succeeded by: William J. Hartnett

Personal details
- Born: January 30, 1952 Mansfield, Ohio, U.S.
- Died: April 6, 2015 (aged 63) Mansfield, Ohio, U.S.
- Party: Democratic

Frank S. Sawyer (January 30, 1952 – April 6, 2015) was a member of the Ohio House of Representatives.
