= Bob Nettle =

American politician (1924–2019)

Robert Nettle
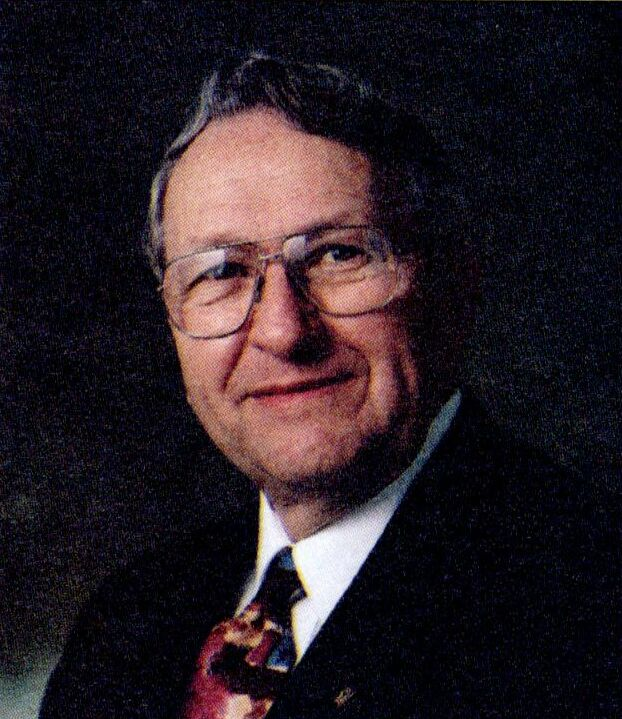

Member of the Ohio Senate from the 28th district
- In office March 4, 1986 – March 31, 1995
- Preceded by: Marcus Roberto
- Succeeded by: Leigh Herington

Member of the Ohio House of Representatives from the 41st district
- In office January 3, 1977 – March 4, 1986
- Preceded by: Kenneth Cox
- Succeeded by: Tom Seese

Personal details
- Born: January 19, 1924 Barberton, Ohio, U.S.
- Died: October 3, 2019 (aged 95) Norton, Ohio, U.S.
- Party: Democratic

Robert Dale Nettle (January 19, 1924 – October 3, 2019) was an American politician who served as a member of the Ohio General Assembly. He was also a member of the Barberton City Council for a number of years. Originally elected to the Ohio House of Representatives in 1976, Nettle went on to serve five terms in the lower chamber. In 1986, following the death of Senator Marcus Roberto, Nettle was chosen by Senate Democrats for an appointment to his seat. He went on to win election to the remaining two years of Roberto's term in 1986. He won election to a full term in 1988. By 1990, Nettle was serving as minority whip. However, after his reelection in 1992, he became assistant minority whip.

In 1995, midway through his third term in the Senate, Nettle announced he would retire. He resigned on March 31, 1995, citing health concerns. Ultimately, after much debate, he was replaced by Leigh Herington. He went on to serve on the Ohio Elections Commission, being appointed by Ohio Governor George Voinovich, and served on the board for a number of years. He returned to Barberton in retirement and died in October 2019 at the age of 95.
