= Dan Troy =

American politician (born 1948)

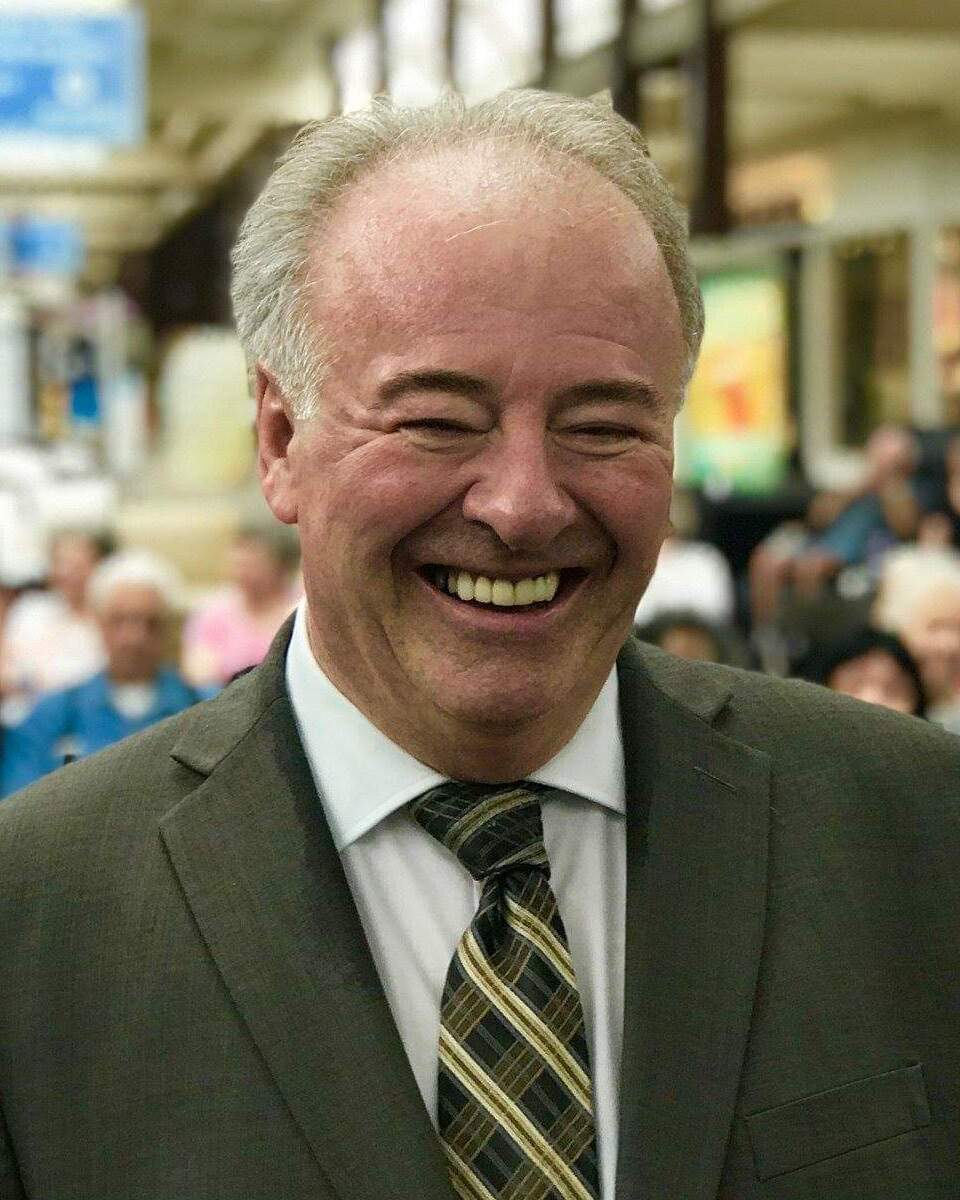
- Troy in 2022

Member of the Ohio House of Representatives from the 23rd district
- Incumbent
- Assumed office January 4, 2021
- Preceded by: John Rogers

Member of the Ohio House of Representatives from the 70th district
- In office January 3, 1983 – December 31, 1996
- Preceded by: Ed Hughes
- Succeeded by: Jamie Callender

Personal details
- Born: June 6, 1948 (age 78) Cleveland, Ohio, U.S.
- Party: Democratic
- Education: University of Dayton (BA)
- Website: https://danieltroy.com

Military service
- Allegiance: United States
- Branch/service: United States Army

Daniel P. Troy (born June 6, 1948) is an Ohio politician from Lake County, Ohio. In 2020, he was elected to the Ohio House of Representatives, having previously served seven terms in the House, interspersed with several terms as Commissioner for Lake County, Ohio. He represents the 23rd district, encompassing the cities of Eastlake, Mentor-on-the-Lake, Richmond Heights, Wickliffe, Willoughby, Willowick, half of Mentor, the villages of Gates Mills, Mayfield, and Timberlake.

Troy won re-election in the 2022 Statehouse race against George Phillips with 51.4% of the vote. In 2020, Dan Troy beat George Phillips with 50.7% of the vote. Although the area he represents is mostly the same from 2020, the district number changed from 60 to 23.

Troy is in his ninth term in the Ohio House of Representatives and serves as the Ranking Member on Ways and Means Committee. His other committee assignments include the Finance Committee, Ranking Member on Finance Subcommittee on Agriculture, State and Local Government, Public Utilities, and Armed Services.

== Early life and education ==
Troy was born in Cleveland and grew up in Lake County, Ohio. He graduated from St. Joseph High School and the University of Dayton with a Bachelor of Arts in political science.
