= Ron Gerberry =

American politician

Ronald V. Gerberry

Member of the Ohio House of Representatives from the 59th district
- In office February 21, 2007 – August 21, 2015
- Preceded by: Ken Carano
- In office December 12, 1982 – December 31, 2000
- Preceded by: Tom Carney
- Succeeded by: Kenneth Carano

Personal details
- Party: Democratic
- Education: Youngstown State University

Ron Gerberry is a former Democratic member of the Ohio House of Representatives for the 59th district.

Gerberry was first appointed to the House to represent the 65th district in 1982, to fill the term of Tom Carney, and served in this position through 2000, when he was forced out by term limits. He then ran for, and won, a term as recorder of Mahoning County, Ohio. In 2007, when representative Kenneth Carano of the 59th district was appointed regional director of the governor's office, Gerberry was appointed to fill his seat. He subsequently won elections in the district in 2008 and 2010.

On August 21, 2015, Gerberry resigned his seat and pleaded guilty in Mahoning County Common Pleas Court to a single charge of unlawful compensation of a public official, a first-degree misdemeanor, related to his improper handling of campaign contributions. Under the terms of a plea deal with Mahoning County prosecutors, he was required to resign and not seek public office for seven years. Gerberry received a suspended sentence of 180 days in jail, as well as three years of unsupervised probation, and was required to perform 500 hours of community service.

At the time of his resignation, Gerberry was 62 years of age and was the longest-serving Democrat in the Ohio House of Representatives, having served in the Ohio House a total of 27 years.
