= Michael G. Verich =

American politician (born 1953)

Mike Verich

Member of the Ohio House of Representatives from the 66th district
- In office January 3, 1983 – December 8, 1998
- Preceded by: Bob Nader
- Succeeded by: Chris Verich

Personal details
- Born: December 30, 1953 (age 72) Warren, Ohio, U.S.
- Party: Democratic

Michael Gregory Verich (born December 30, 1953) is a former American politician who served as a Democratic member of the Ohio House of Representatives from 1983 to 1998. His district consisted of a portion of Trumbull County, Ohio. He resigned to take up a position on the Ohio State Employment Relations Board (SERB) before his ninth term commenced in January 1999. His brother Chris was appointed to succeed him.
