= Vern Riffe =

American politician (1925 – 1997)

96th Speaker of the Ohio House of Representatives
- In office January 6, 1975 - January 2, 1995
- Preceded by: A. G. Lancione
- Succeeded by: Jo Ann Davidson

Member of the Ohio House of Representatives from the 92nd district
- In office January 3, 1967 – December 31, 1994
- Preceded by: District established
- Succeeded by: William L. Ogg

Personal details
- Born: June 25, 1925 New Boston, Ohio
- Died: July 31, 1997 (aged 72) Columbus, Ohio
- Party: Democratic

Vernal G. Riffe Jr. (June 26, 1925 – July 31, 1997) was an American politician and member of the Democratic Party. Riffe served in the Ohio House of Representatives for 36 years, from 1959 to 1995, and served as speaker for 19 years, from 1975 to 1994.

== Life and political career ==
Vern Riffe's father, Vernal G. Riffe, Sr., was involved in local government in their hometown of New Boston, Ohio, holding positions such as mayor, safety director, and police officer.

Riffe was a moderate Democrat. He represented the 92nd District, which included Southern Ohio. He worked to secure funding for development projects in Southern Ohio. These projects included Shawnee State University in Portsmouth and State Route 32, which has been referred to as both the "Highway to Nowhere" and the Appalachian Highway.

Several state entities and programs in Ohio were named after Riffe. These include the Vernal Riffe Chair at Ohio State University, the Vernal G. Riffe Building at Ohio State, the Vern Riffe Center for Government and the Arts in Columbus, and the Vern Riffe Center for the Arts in Portsmouth.

Thelma L. Riffe, Riffe's widow, died on August 4, 2010. Both are buried at Memorial Burial Park in Wheelersburg, Ohio.

== Autobiography ==
An autobiographical book, Whatever's Fair, co-written by Cliff Treyens, a former Columbus Dispatch writer, was published in the spring of 2007. A gathering of family, friends, and former political colleagues was held the day before Riffe's birthday at the Portsmouth Welcome Center to introduce the book.
