= Judy Sheerer =

American politician (1940–2016)

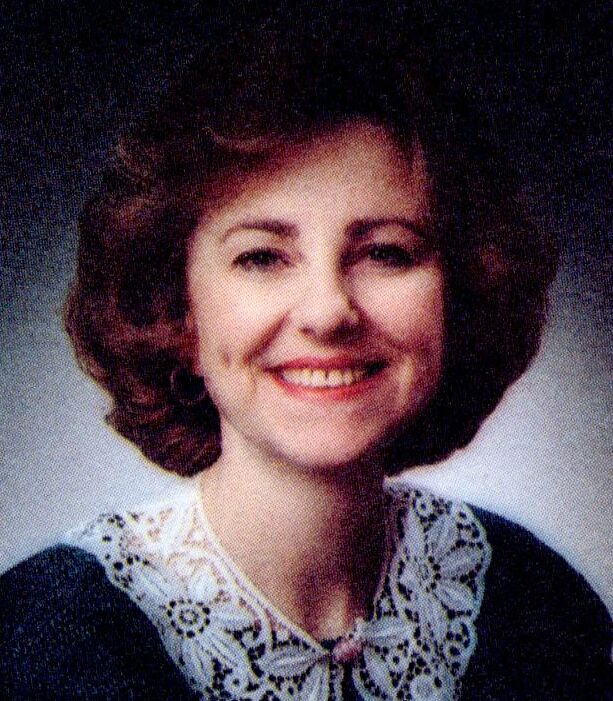

Member of the Ohio Senate from the 25th district
- In office December 17, 1992-December 31, 1998
- Preceded by: Eric Fingerhut
- Succeeded by: Eric Fingerhut

Member of the Ohio House of Representatives from the 18th district
- In office January 3, 1983-December 31, 1992
- Preceded by: Lee Fisher
- Succeeded by: Barbara Boyd

Personal details
- Born: November 17, 1940
- Died: January 4, 2016 (aged 75)
- Party: Democratic
- Spouse: Benjamin Sheerer

Judith B. Sheerer (November 17, 1940 – January 4, 2016) was a member of the Ohio General Assembly, serving in both the Ohio House of Representatives and the Ohio Senate from 1983 to 1998. She was originally elected to the Ohio House in 1983, succeeding Matt Hatchadorian. By her fifth term, Sheerer was serving as majority whip of the House. In 1992, when Senator Eric Fingerhut was elected to the United States Congress, Senate Democrats appointed Sheerer to his vacant seat. Reelected to her own term in 1994, she opted to not run again in 1998, and was succeeded by her predecessor, Eric Fingerhut. She then served as a member of the Ohio Elections Commission. Sheerer died from complications of dementia in 2016.
