= Ohio's 23rd senatorial district =

American legislative district

Ohio's 23rd State Senate district
Senator
Nickie Antonio; D–Lakewood
- Demographics: 53.9% White; 31.5% Black; 9.8% Hispanic; 4.3% Asian; 1.6% Native American; 0.2% Hawaiian/Pacific Islander
- Population (2020) • Voting age • Citizens of voting age: 375,402; 300,087; 283,026

Ohio's 23rd senatorial district was changed by the 2023 redistricting and is now located along the lake front in Cuyahoga and Lake Counties, west of Cleveland. It consists of House Districts 13, 16 and 20.

The current Ohio Senator is Democrat Nickie Antonio and will be succeeded by member-elect Bride Sweeney in January 2027.

== 2026 election results ==
Bride Sweeney (D) 94,458 78.1%

Robert Dintaman (R) 26,491 21.9%

== Historically ==
Before the 2023 redistricting, Ohio's 23rd senatorial district has always been based in western Cuyahoga County, and includes the western third of Cleveland and some of Cleveland's western suburbs. It encompasses Ohio House districts 13, 14 and 15. It has a Cook PVI of D+21.

== List of senators ==
Senator	Party	Term	Notes
Anthony F. Novak	Democrat	January 3, 1965 – December 31, 1974	Novak lost the party re-nomination to Chuck Butts in 1974.
Chuck Butts	Democrat	January 3, 1975 – December 31, 1990	Butts lost re-election in 1990 to Anthony Sinagra.
Anthony Sinagra	Republican	January 3, 1991 – December 31, 1994	Sinagra lost re-election in 1994 to Dennis Kucinich.
Dennis Kucinich	Democrat	January 3, 1995 – January 6, 1997	Kucinich resigned in 1997 after winning election to the United States Congress.
Patrick Sweeney	Democrat	January 6, 1997 – December 31, 1998	Sweeney did not seek election in 1998.
Dan Brady	Democrat	January 5, 1999 – February 28, 2006	Brady resigned in 2006 to take a position with Cleveland Mayor Frank Jackson.
Dale Miller	Democrat	February 28, 2006 – December 31, 2010	Miller did not seek re-election in 2010 and instead ran for Cuyahoga County Council.
Mike Skindell	Democrat	January 3, 2011 – December 31, 2018	Skindell was term-limited in the state Senate in 2018 and opted to return to the state House of Representatives.
Nickie Antonio	Democrat	January 7, 2018 – present	Incumbent
