= 2018 Cuyahoga County Council election =

- November 6, 2018

7 of the 11 seats on the Cuyahoga County Council 6 seats needed for a majority
- Turnout: 54.5% ▼14.7 pp
	Majority party	Minority party
Party	Democratic	Republican
Last election	8	3
Seats won	8	3
Seat change	Steady	Steady
Popular vote	163,261	65,876
Percentage	71.3%	28.7%
Swing	▲1.9%	▼1.9%
- Results: Democratic hold Republican hold No election
President before election
Dan Brady
Democratic
Elected President
Dan Brady
Democratic

The 2018 Cuyahoga County Council election was held on November 6, 2018, to elect members of the County Council of Cuyahoga County, Ohio. Odd-numbered districts were up for election to four-year terms, while District 10 held a special election to fill out the remainder of Anthony Hairston's term following his election to Cleveland City Council in 2017.

Republicans defended both of their seats up for election, while Democrats defended all five of theirs, maintaining the partisan balance in the chamber.

== District 1 ==
=== Republican primary ===
==== Primary results ====
Republican primary election results
Party	Candidate	Votes	%
Republican	Nan Baker (incumbent)	6,745	100.00%
Total votes		6,745	100.00

=== General election ===
==== Results ====
General election results
Party	Candidate	Votes	%	±%
Republican	Nan Baker (incumbent)	34,272	100.00%	+37.92%
Total votes		34,272	100.00	N/A
Republican hold				

== District 3 ==
=== Democratic primary ===
==== Primary results ====
Democratic primary election results
Party	Candidate	Votes	%
Democratic	Dan Brady (incumbent)	3,398	62.36%
Democratic	Lyonette Cintron	2,051	37.64%
Total votes		5,449	100.00

=== General election ===
==== Results ====
General election results
Party	Candidate	Votes	%	±%
Democratic	Dan Brady (incumbent)	20,205	97.85%	−2.15%
Write-in		445	2.15%	+2.15%
Total votes		20,650	100.00	N/A
Democratic hold				

== District 5 ==
=== Republican primary ===
==== Primary results ====
Republican primary election results
Party	Candidate	Votes	%
Republican	Michael J. Gallagher (incumbent)	5,607	100.00%
Total votes		5,607	100.00

=== General election ===
==== Results ====
General election results
Party	Candidate	Votes	%	±%
Republican	Michael J. Gallagher (incumbent)	31,604	100.00%	+0.00%
Total votes		31,604	100.00	N/A
Republican hold				

== District 7 ==
=== Democratic primary ===
==== Primary results ====
Democratic primary election results
Party	Candidate	Votes	%
Democratic	Yvonne M. Conwell (incumbent)	6,350	86.23%
Democratic	Kris Harsh (withdrawn)	-	-
Total votes		6,350	100.00

=== General election ===
==== Results ====
General election results
Party	Candidate	Votes	%	±%
Democratic	Yvonne M. Conwell (incumbent)	27,498	100.00%	+0.00%
Total votes		27,498	100.00	N/A
Democratic hold				

== District 9 ==
=== Democratic primary ===
==== Primary results ====
Democratic primary election results
Party	Candidate	Votes	%
Democratic	Shontel Brown (incumbent)	11,923	100.00%
Total votes		11,923	100.00

=== General election ===
==== Results ====
General election results
Party	Candidate	Votes	%	±%
Democratic	Shontel Brown (incumbent)	40,664	100.00%	+19.50%
Total votes		40,664	100.00	N/A
Democratic hold				

== District 10 ==
=== Democratic primary ===
==== Primary results ====
Democratic primary election results
Party	Candidate	Votes	%
Democratic	Cheryl L. Stephens	6,611	52.96%
Democratic	Michael J. Houser (incumbent)	5,872	47.04%
Total votes		12,483	100.00

=== General election ===
==== Results ====
General election results
Party	Candidate	Votes	%	±%
Democratic	Cheryl L. Stephens	36,707	100.00%	+0.00%
Total votes		36,707	100.00	N/A
Democratic hold				

== District 11 ==
=== Democratic primary ===
==== Primary results ====
Democratic primary election results
Party	Candidate	Votes	%
Democratic	Sunny Simon (incumbent)	9,560	100.00%
Total votes		9,560	100.00

=== General election ===
==== Results ====
General election results
Party	Candidate	Votes	%	±%
Democratic	Sunny Simon	38,187	100.00%	+29.08%
Total votes		38,187	100.00	N/A
Democratic hold				
