= 2016 Cuyahoga County Council election =

- November 8, 2016

5 of the 11 seats on the Cuyahoga County Council 6 seats needed for a majority
- Turnout: 69.2% ▲29.6 pp
	Majority party	Minority party
Party	Democratic	Republican
Last election	8	3
Seats won	8	3
Seat change	Steady	Steady
Popular vote	123,734	54,672
Percentage	69.4%	30.6%
Swing	▲4.3%	▼4.3%
- Results: Democratic hold Republican hold No election
President before election
Dan Brady
Democratic
Elected President
Dan Brady
Democratic

The 2016 Cuyahoga County Council election was held on November 8, 2016, to elect members of the County Council of Cuyahoga County, Ohio. Even-numbered districts were up for election to four-year terms.

The Republicans defended their single seat up for election, while the Democrats defended all 4 of theirs, maintaining the partisan balance in the chamber. The only contested district was District 2, which was won by incumbent Democratic council member Dale Miller.

== District 2 ==
=== Democratic primary ===
==== Primary results ====
Democratic primary election results
Party	Candidate	Votes	%
Democratic	Dale Miller (incumbent)	10,925	100.00%
Total votes		10,925	100.00

=== Republican primary ===
==== Primary results ====
Republican primary election results
Party	Candidate	Votes	%
Republican	Tim Corrigan	6,115	100.00%
Total votes		6,115	100.00

=== General election ===
==== Results ====
General election results
Party	Candidate	Votes	%	±%
Democratic	Dale Miller (incumbent)	28,448	62.61%	−10.29%
Republican	Tim Corrigan	17,010	37.39%	+10.29%
Total votes		45,458	100.00	N/A
Democratic hold				

== District 4 ==
=== Democratic primary ===
==== Primary results ====
Democratic primary election results
Party	Candidate	Votes	%
Democratic	Scott M. Tuma	7,972	100.00%
Total votes		7,972	100.00

=== Republican primary ===
==== Primary results ====
Republican primary election results
Party	Candidate	Votes	%
	Write-in	955	100.00
Total votes		955	100.00

=== General election ===
==== Results ====
General election results
Party	Candidate	Votes	%	±%
Democratic	Scott M. Tuma	26,836	100.00%	+0.00%
Total votes		26,836	100.00	N/A
Democratic hold				

== District 6 ==
=== Republican primary ===
==== Primary results ====
Republican primary election results
Party	Candidate	Votes	%
Republican	Jack Schron (incumbent)	12,311	100.00%
Total votes		12,311	100.00

=== General election ===
==== Results ====
General election results
Party	Candidate	Votes	%	±%
Republican	Jack Schron (incumbent)	37,662	100.00%	+0.00%
Total votes		37,662	100.00	N/A
Republican hold				

== District 8 ==
=== Democratic primary ===
==== Primary results ====
Democratic primary election results
Party	Candidate	Votes	%
Democratic	Pernel Jones Jr. (incumbent)	11,164	100.00%
Total votes		11,164	100.00

=== General election ===
==== Results ====
General election results
Party	Candidate	Votes	%	±%
Democratic	Pernel Jones Jr. (incumbent)	31,150	100.00%	+0.00%
Total votes		31,150	100.00	N/A
Democratic hold				

== District 10 ==
=== Democratic primary ===
==== Primary results ====
Democratic primary election results
Party	Candidate	Votes	%
Democratic	Anthony T. Hairston (incumbent)	13,373	100.00%
Total votes		13,373	100.00

=== General election ===
==== Results ====
General election results
Party	Candidate	Votes	%	±%
Democratic	Anthony T. Hairston (incumbent)	37,300	100.00%	+0.00%
Total votes		37,300	100.00	N/A
Democratic hold				
