= 2012 Cuyahoga County Council election =

- November 6, 2012

5 of the 11 seats on the Cuyahoga County Council 6 seats needed for a majority
- Turnout: 70.9% ▲26.7 pp
	Majority party	Minority party
Party	Democratic	Republican
Last election	8	3
Seats won	8	3
Seat change	Steady	Steady
Popular vote	134,732	44,675
Percentage	75.1%	24.9%
Swing	▲14.2%	▼9.4%
- Results: Democratic hold Republican hold No election
President before election
C. Ellen Connally
Democratic
Elected President
C. Ellen Connally
Democratic

The 2012 Cuyahoga County Council election was held on November 6, 2012, to elect members in even-numbered districts to four-year terms.

No seats changed hands in this election, and only District 2 was contested. Democrats defended all four of their seats up for election, maintaining their majority in the chamber.

== District 2 ==
=== Democratic primary ===
==== Primary results ====
Democratic primary election results
Party	Candidate	Votes	%
Democratic	Dale Miller (incumbent)	9,346	100.00%
Total votes		9,346	100.00

=== Republican primary ===
==== Primary results ====
Republican primary election results
Party	Candidate	Votes	%
Republican	Anna E. Melendez	2,887	100.00%
Total votes		2,887	100.00

=== General election ===
==== Results ====
General election results
Party	Candidate	Votes	%	±%
Democratic	Dale Miller (incumbent)	32,101	72.90%	+13.71%
Republican	Anna E. Melendez	11,934	27.10%	−3.44%
Total votes		44,035	100.00	N/A
Democratic hold				

== District 4 ==
=== Democratic primary ===
==== Primary results ====
Democratic primary election results
Party	Candidate	Votes	%
Democratic	Chuck Germana (incumbent)	8,469	100.00%
Total votes		8,469	100.00

=== General election ===
==== Results ====
General election results
Party	Candidate	Votes	%	±%
Democratic	Chuck Germana (incumbent)	29,750	100.00%	+45.38%
Total votes		29,750	100.00	N/A
Democratic hold				

== District 6 ==
=== Republican primary ===
==== Primary results ====
Republican primary election results
Party	Candidate	Votes	%
Republican	Jack Schron (incumbent)	7,617	100.00%
Total votes		7,617	100.00

=== General election ===
==== Results ====
General election results
Party	Candidate	Votes	%	±%
Republican	Jack Schron (incumbent)	32,741	100.00%	+39.92%
Total votes		32,741	100.00	N/A
Republican hold				

== District 8 ==
=== Democratic primary ===
==== Primary results ====
Democratic primary election results
Party	Candidate	Votes	%
Democratic	Pernel Jones Jr. (incumbent)	7,960	100.00%
Total votes		7,960	100.00

=== General election ===
==== Results ====
General election results
Party	Candidate	Votes	%	±%
Democratic	Pernel Jones Jr. (incumbent)	33,372	100.00%	+17.22%
Total votes		33,372	100.00	N/A
Democratic hold				

== District 10 ==
=== Democratic primary ===
==== Primary results ====
Democratic primary election results
Party	Candidate	Votes	%
Democratic	Julian Rogers (incumbent)	9,597	100.00%
Total votes		9,597	100.00

=== General election ===
==== Results ====
General election results
Party	Candidate	Votes	%	±%
Democratic	Julian Rogers (incumbent)	39,509	100.00%	+15.37%
Total votes		39,509	100.00	N/A
Democratic hold				
