= 1994 Ohio Secretary of State election =

- November 8, 1994
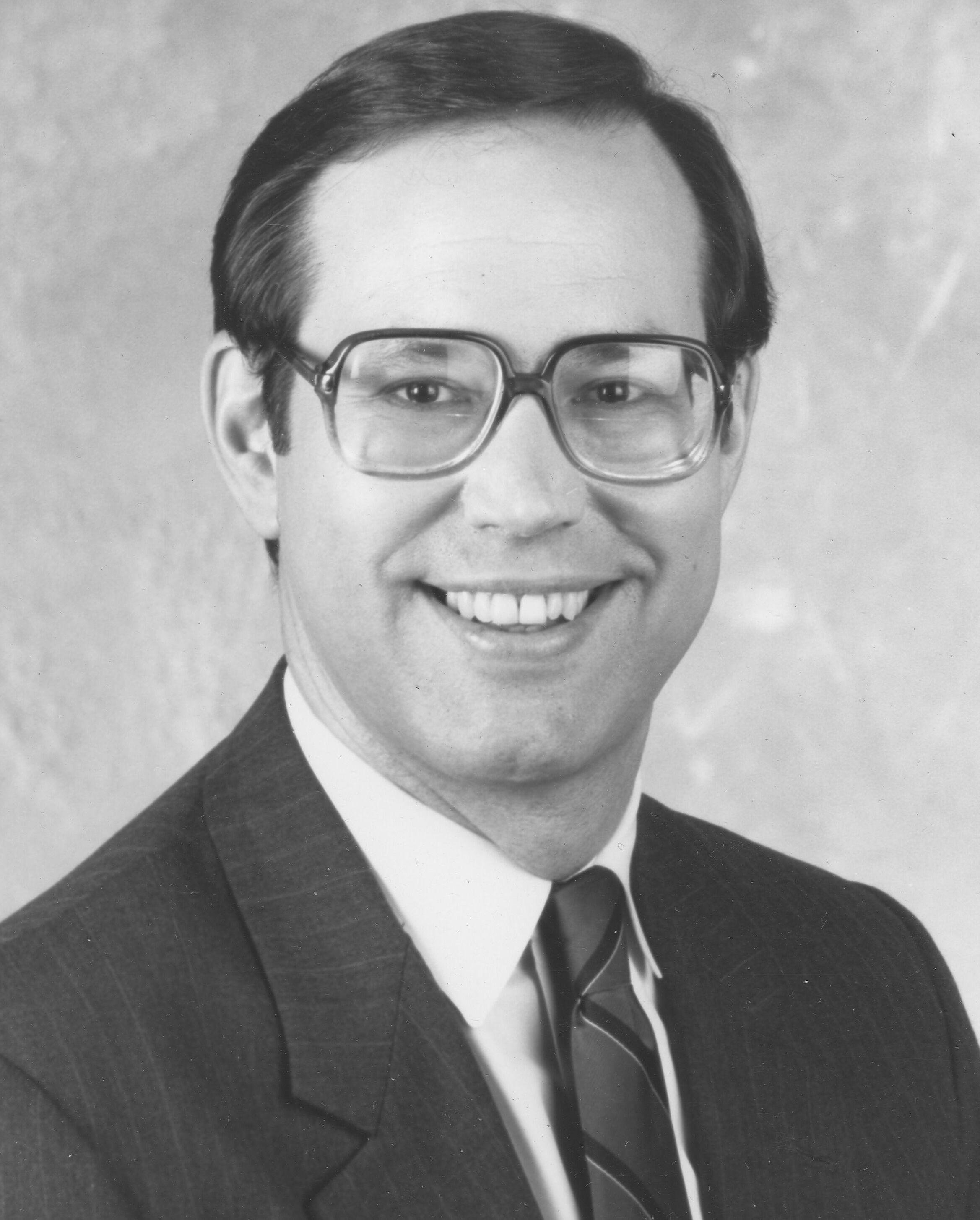

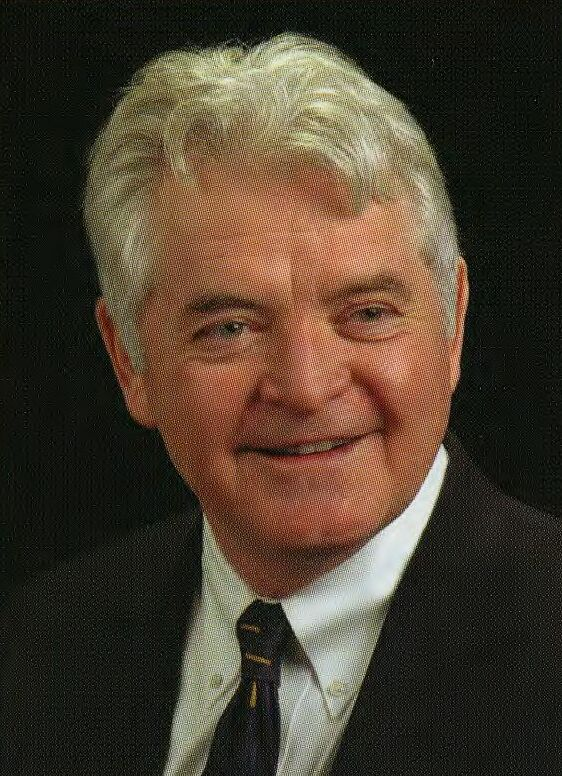
Nominee	Bob Taft	Dan Brady
Party	Republican	Democratic
Popular vote	2,116,258	1,150,460
Percentage	64.78%	35.22%
- County results Taft: 50–60% 60–70% 70-80% Brady: 50–60%
Secretary of State before election
Bob Taft
Republican
Elected Secretary of State
Bob Taft
Republican

The 1994 Ohio Secretary of State election was held on November 8, 1994, to elect the Ohio Secretary of State. Primaries were held on May 3, 1994. Incumbent Republican Ohio Secretary of State Bob Taft won re-election in a landslide, defeating Democratic Cleveland City Council member Dan Brady by a nearly two-to-one margin.

== Republican primary ==
=== Candidates ===
- Bob Taft, incumbent Ohio Secretary of State (1991–1999)

=== Campaign ===
Taft won renomination unopposed.

=== Results ===
Republican primary results
Party	Candidate	Votes	%
Republican	Bob Taft	686,571	100%
Total votes		686,571	100.00%

== Democratic primary ==
=== Candidates ===
- Dan Brady, Cleveland City Council member (1986–1996)

=== Campaign ===
Brady won the Democratic nomination without opposition.

=== Results ===
Democratic primary results
Party	Candidate	Votes	%
Democratic	Dan Brady	643,384	100%
Total votes		643,384	100.00%

== General election ==
=== Candidates ===
- Bob Taft, incumbent Ohio Secretary of State (1991–1999) (Republican)
- Dan Brady, Cleveland City Council member (1986–1996) (Democratic)

=== Results ===
1994 Ohio Secretary of State election results
Party	Candidate	Votes	%	±%
Republican	Bob Taft	2,116,258	64.78%	+11.77%
Democratic	Dan Brady	1,150,460	35.22%	−11.77%
Total votes		3,266,718	100.00%	
Republican hold				
