= 2002 Ohio Secretary of State election =

- November 5, 2002
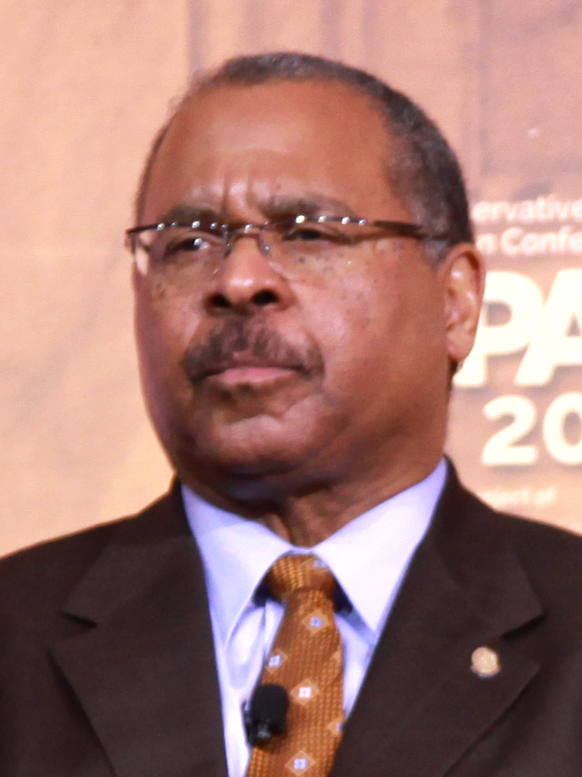

Nominee	Ken Blackwell	Bryan Flannery
Party	Republican	Democratic
Popular vote	1,827,995	1,256,428
Percentage	59.27%	40.73%
- County results Blackwell: 50–60% 60–70% 70-80% Flannery: 50–60% 60–70%
Secretary of State before election
Ken Blackwell
Republican
Elected Secretary of State
Ken Blackwell
Republican

The 2002 Ohio Secretary of State election was held on November 5, 2002, to elect the Ohio Secretary of State. Primaries were held on May 7, 2002. Republican incumbent Ohio Secretary of State Ken Blackwell won re-election in a landslide, defeating Democratic challenger, Ohio House Representative Bryan Flannery, by nearly 20 percentage points.

== Republican primary ==
=== Candidates ===
- Ken Blackwell, incumbent Ohio Secretary of State (1999–2007)

=== Campaign ===
Blackwell won renomination unopposed.

=== Results ===
Republican primary results
Party	Candidate	Votes	%
Republican	Ken Blackwell	511,798	100%
Total votes		511,798	100%

== Democratic primary ==
=== Candidates ===
- Bryan Flannery, Ohio House Representative (1999–2002)

=== Campaign ===
Flannery won the Democratic nomination without opposition.

=== Results ===
Democratic primary results
Party	Candidate	Votes	%
Democratic	Bryan Flannery	399,781	100%
Total votes		399,781	100%

== General election ==
=== Candidates ===
- Ken Blackwell, incumbent Ohio Secretary of State (1999–2007) (Republican)
- Bryan Flannery, Ohio House Representative (1999–2002) (Democratic)

=== Results ===
2002 Ohio Secretary of State election results
Party	Candidate	Votes	%	±%
Republican	Ken Blackwell	1,827,995	59.27%	+3.24%
Democratic	Bryan Flannery	1,256,428	40.73%	−3.24%
Total votes		3,084,423	100.0%	
Republican hold				
