= 1979 Cleveland mayoral election =

- November 6, 1979
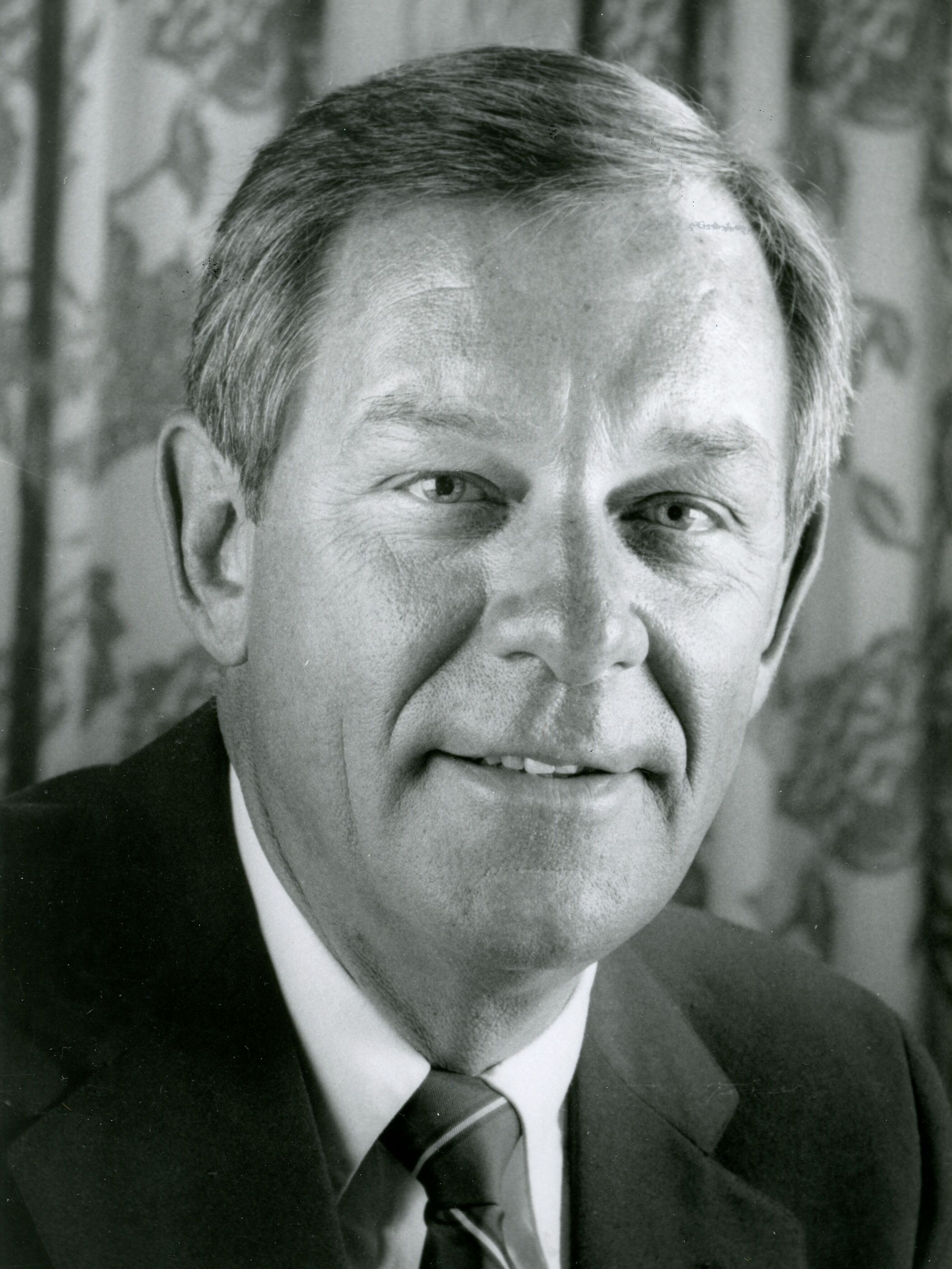

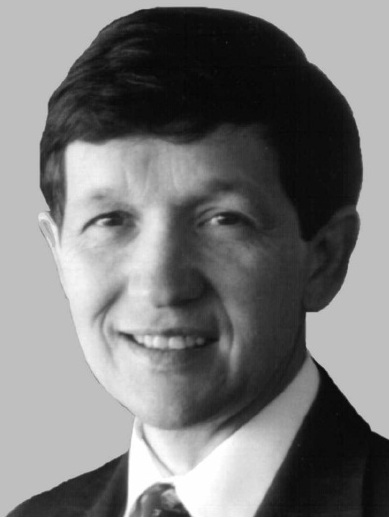
Candidate	George Voinovich	Dennis Kucinich
Party	Nonpartisan	Nonpartisan
Popular vote	94,541	73,755
Percentage	56.18%	43.83%
Mayor before election
Dennis Kucinich
Democratic
Elected mayor
George Voinovich
Republican

The 1979 Cleveland mayoral election took place on November 6, 1979, to elect the Mayor of Cleveland, Ohio. George Voinovich defeated incumbent mayor Dennis Kucinich. The election was officially nonpartisan, with the top two candidates from the October 2 primary advancing to the general election.

== Background ==
Kucinich had a turbulent mayoralty since he was elected in 1977. He had, in 1978, survived Cleveland's first-ever mayoral recall election.

== Primary ==
As election season approached, Kucinich decided to run again in the mayoral primary. In April, state senator, Charles L. Butts announced that he would enter the race. On July 5, council majority leader, Basil Russo joined the race. Finally, after off-and-on remarks of his candidacy, Republican George Voinovich, who initially supported Kucinich in 1977, decided to give up his position as lieutenant governor of Ohio to run on July 26.

Unlike the 1977 race, however, there were very few debates. The Plain Dealer endorsed Voinovich while The Cleveland Press endorsed Butts. On primary night at Kucinich headquarters, "the band played the theme from Rocky," while Kucinich spoke of the race in the form of a football metaphor: "We are trailing at the half, but what counts is who's winning at the end of the fourth quarter." However, in the primary, the mayor finished second to Voinovich, 47,743 to 36,515 votes. Russo and Butts were eliminated.

== General election campaign ==
Most expected a heated campaign between the two politicians of South Slavic descent (Kucinich being a Croat and Voinovich a Serb). Early in the race, Kucinich jumped on a quote that Voinovich made to The New York Times on August 26: "I like fat cats. I want as many in Cleveland as I can get. Cleveland needs their tax dollars and the jobs they bring." In response, Kucinich stated: "George Voinovich has proven conclusively...–he is the candidate of the fat cats...and he would love to become the mayor of the fat cats so he can repay their generosity." Part of Kucinich's campaign tactics involved distributing political pamphlets throughout the city entitled "Who Owns Voinovich?" The cover illustration depicted three fat cats with Voinovich in front of them with handfuls of money.

However, everything came to a virtual halt when Voinovich's nine-year-old daughter, Molly, was struck by a van and killed. Kucinich could no longer continue his aggressive campaigning against Voinovich. Polls, which were already leaning in Voinovich's favor, now showed overwhelming support for him. On November 6, he won the general election 56-44%. Of the 33 wards of Cleveland at the time, Kucinich only won eight.

== Endorsements ==
Dennis Kucinich

Federal officials

- Dick Celeste, Peace Corps Director, future Governor of Ohio

State executive officials

- Anthony J. Celebrezze Jr., Ohio Secretary of State and son of former Mayor of Cleveland Anthony J. Celebrezze

State legislative officials

- Benny Bonanno, Ohio State Representative from District 8

Local officials

- James Bell, Cleveland City Councilman for Ward 11

Individuals

- Carl B. Stokes, former Mayor of Cleveland and the first African American mayor of a major U.S. city

Labor unions

- United Auto Workers
- Municipal Foremen and Laborers Union Local 1099
- Steelworkers Union Local 13038
- United Transportation Union Local 1661
Kucinich also sought the support of the Cuyahoga County Democratic Party, but it voted to remain neutral.
George Voinovich

U.S. representatives

- Mary Rose Oakar, Democratic U.S. Congresswoman from Ohio

State legislative officials

- Charles L. Butts, Ohio State Senator from District 23

County officials

- Virgil Brown, Cuyahoga County Commissioner
- Robert E. Sweeney, Cuyahoga County Commissioner
- Gerald McFaul, Cuyahoga County Sheriff
- Vincent Campanella, Cuyahoga County Auditor

Local officials

- Basil Russo, Cleveland City Council Majority Leader

Individuals

- Ralph Perk, former Mayor of Cleveland
- Frank Lausche, former Mayor of Cleveland, former Governor of Ohio, former U.S. Senator from Ohio
- Arnold Pinkney, former Cleveland School Board President
- Edmund Turk, former Cleveland City Council President

Labor unions

- AFL–CIO
- International Brotherhood of Teamsters

Organizations

- Cuyahoga County Republican Party
- Black Elected Officials Caucus

Newspapers

- The Plain Dealer
- The Cleveland Press
- The Cleveland Call and Post

== Results ==
=== Primary election ===
Primary election results
Candidate	Votes	%
George Voinovich	47,743	37.54%
Dennis Kucinich (incumbent)	36,515	28.71%
Basil Russo	21,962	17.27%
Charles L. Butts	19,431	15.28%
Thabo L. Ntweng	1,546	1.22%
Total votes	127,197	

=== General election ===
Cleveland mayoral election, 1979
Candidate	Votes	%
George Voinovich	94,541	56.18%
Dennis Kucinich (incumbent)	73,755	43.83%
Total votes	168,296	
