= Michael Foley (Ohio politician) =

American politician

Mike Foley

Member of the Ohio House of Representatives from the 14th district
- In office May 12, 2006-December 31, 2014
- Preceded by: Dale Miller
- Succeeded by: Martin J. Sweeney

Personal details
- Born: June 17, 1963 (age 63) Dayton, Ohio
- Party: Democratic
- Education: University of Dayton, Cleveland-Marshall College of Law
- Profession: Community Organizer, Attorney
- Website: www.mikefoleyforohio.com

Michael Foley (born June 17, 1963) is a former member of the Ohio House of Representatives, representing the 14th District from 2006 to 2014.

== Career ==
Prior to his time in the House, Foley had worked as director of the Cleveland Tenants Organization, as well as a court administrator, bailiff and community organizer.

== Ohio House of Representatives ==
When Representative Dale Miller was appointed to replace Dan Brady in the Ohio Senate, Foley was among three who sought to succeed him in the Ohio House, along with former state representative Erin Sullivan. In the end, the House Democratic Caucus chose to leave the seat open until after the May primary. The primary election proved to be very close, and Foley won the election by just ten votes. After a mandatory recount, it was initially decided that he had lost the race to teacher Bill Ritter, but ultimately he was deemed victorious. Foley went on to win the general election in the fall of 2006. He was reelected handily in 2008 and 2010.

In December 2007 after Steve Driehaus stepped down from his post as Assistant Minority Whip, Foley was appointed to the position by Minority Leader Joyce Beatty. For the 128th General Assembly, House Speaker Armond Budish named Foley Chairman of the Housing and Urban Revitalization Committee.

Back to the minority in the 129th General Assembly, Foley is currently serving as a member of the Financial Institutions, Housing, and Urban Development Committee, the Insurance Committee and the Insurance Subcommittee on Workers' Compensation, the Public Utilities Committee, and the Ways and Means Committee.

Foley won a final term in 2012, defeating Richard Cyngier with 68% of the vote. He was term-limited in 2014.

== Initiatives, policies and positions ==
Foley has struck out against Republicans for their initiative to repeal the estate tax, stating "Without it, local governments will be forced to cut services and further contemplate raising taxes on their own citizens to make up for the shortfall."

A contributor to the Ohio transportation budget, Foley is critical of an exemption that eliminates the commercial activity tax for petroleum exchange transactions, stating it is a $5 million to $10 million annual "giveaway."

Building off his opposition to S.B. 5, Foley introduced legislation with Bob Hagan that would allow voters to recall the governor, other statewide officeholders, and members of the General Assembly. They stated that the measure was initiated by John Kasich's low approval ratings and the outcry that occurred after S.B. 5.
