= Sinagra =

Sinagra can refer to:

- Sinagra, Sicily, a town in the province of Messina on the island of Sicily in Italy
- Sinagra, Western Australia, a suburb of Perth in Australia

== People with the surname ==
- Adam Sinagra (born 1995), Canadian football quarterback
- Anthony Sinagra (born 1940), American politician
- Diego Sinagra (born 1986), Italian-Argentine football player, son of Diego Maradona
- Jack Sinagra (1950–2013), American politician
- Vince Sinagra (born 1952), American football coach
- Vincenzo Sinagra, criminal
