= 2010 Cuyahoga County Council election =

- November 2, 2010

11 seats on the Cuyahoga County Council 6 seats needed for a majority
- Turnout: 44.2%
	Majority party	Minority party
Party	Democratic	Republican
Seats won	8	3
Seat change	▲8	▲3
Popular vote	242,069	136,174
Percentage	60.9%	34.3%
- Results: Democratic gain Republican gain
Elected President
C. Ellen Connally
Democratic

The 2010 Cuyahoga County Council election was held on November 2, 2010 to elect all 11 members of the newly formed County Council of Cuyahoga County, Ohio. This was the first held under the newly ratified Charter of Cuyahoga County, which replaced Cuyahoga's 200 year old Board of County Commissioners with an executive and legislature.

Democrats won control of the body with 8 seats to the 3 won by Republicans.

== District 1 ==
=== Democratic primary ===
==== Primary results ====
Democratic primary election results
Party	Candidate	Votes	%
Democratic	Nicole Dailey Jones	3,340	34.41%
Democratic	Maureen M. Sweeney	2,152	22.24%
Democratic	James H. French	1,768	18.27%
Democratic	Pete Matia	1,374	14.20%
Democratic	Dennis M. Lambert	664	6.86%
Democratic	Walt Halun	380	3.93%
Total votes		9,678	100.00

=== Republican primary ===
==== Primary results ====
Republican primary election results
Party	Candidate	Votes	%
Republican	Dave Greenspan	4,065	41.22%
Republican	Brian A. Hurtuk	3,969	40.25%
Republican	Thomas Harrison	1,058	10.73%
Republican	Paul J. Daley	769	7.80%
Total votes		9,861	100.00

=== Libertarian primary ===
==== Primary results ====
Libertarian primary election results
Party	Candidate	Votes	%
Libertarian	Ryan T. McGilvray	99	100.00%
Total votes		99	100.00

=== General election ===
==== Results ====
General election results
Party	Candidate	Votes	%
Republican	Dave Greenspan	27,614	54.47%
Democratic	Nicole Dailey Jones	20,824	41.08%
Libertarian	Ryan T. McGilvray	2,258	4.45%
Total votes		50,696	100.00
Republican win (new seat)			

== District 2 ==
=== Democratic primary ===
==== Primary results ====
Democratic primary election results
Party	Candidate	Votes	%
Democratic	Dale Miller	6,758	69.06%
Democratic	Tom Jordan	3,027	22.24%
Total votes		9,785	100.00

=== Republican primary ===
==== Primary results ====
Republican primary election results
Party	Candidate	Votes	%
Republican	John Zappala	2,910	100.00%
Total votes		2,910	100.00

=== General election ===
==== Results ====
General election results
Party	Candidate	Votes	%
Democratic	Dale Miller	19,174	59.19%
Republican	John Zappala	9,894	30.54%
Independent	Lynn Graham	1,876	5.79%
Independent	Edward M. McCartney	1,072	3.31%
Independent	Steve A. Bozsa Jr.	376	1.16%
Total votes		32,392	100.00
Democratic win (new seat)			

== District 3 ==
=== Democratic primary ===
==== Primary results ====
Democratic primary election results
Party	Candidate	Votes	%
Democratic	Dan Brady	2,777	46.17%
Democratic	Chris Ronayne	2,567	42.83%
Democratic	Nelson Cintron Jr.	375	6.23%
Democratic	Chip Joseph	149	2.48%
Democratic	Faouzi A. Baddour	138	2.29%
Total votes		6,015	100.00

=== Republican primary ===
==== Primary results ====
Republican primary election results
Party	Candidate	Votes	%
Republican	Patty Gascoyne	1,142	100.00%
Total votes		1,142	100.00

=== Green primary ===
==== Primary results ====
Republican primary election results
Party	Candidate	Votes	%
Green	Alan Crossman	44	100.00%
Total votes		44	100.00

=== General election ===
==== Results ====
General election results
Party	Candidate	Votes	%
Democratic	Dan Brady	12,325	69.01%
Republican	Patty Gascoyne	4,158	23.28%
Green	Alan Crossman	1,378	7.72%
Total votes		17,861	100.00
Democratic win (new seat)			

== District 4 ==
=== Democratic primary ===
==== Primary results ====
Democratic primary election results
Party	Candidate	Votes	%
Democratic	Chuck Germana	7,946	56.99%
Democratic	Barbara Anne Ferris	4,624	33.16%
Democratic	Matthew Bolek	1,374	9.85%
Total votes		13,944	100.00

=== Republican primary ===
==== Primary results ====
Republican primary election results
Party	Candidate	Votes	%
Republican	Pete Draganic	2,869	42.39%
Republican	Arlene R. McNamara	2,481	36.66%
Republican	Thomas R. Olschlager	1,418	20.95%
Total votes		6,768	100.00

=== General election ===
==== Results ====
General election results
Party	Candidate	Votes	%
Democratic	Chuck Germana	21,855	54.62%
Republican	Pete Draganic	18,160	45.38%
Total votes		40,465	100.00
Democratic win (new seat)			

== District 5 ==
=== Democratic primary ===
==== Primary results ====
Democratic primary election results
Party	Candidate	Votes	%
Democratic	Ann Marie Donegan	4,843	59.02%
Democratic	Mike Piepsny	3,362	40.98%
Total votes		8,205	100.00

=== Republican primary ===
==== Primary results ====
Republican primary election results
Party	Candidate	Votes	%
Republican	Michael J. Gallagher	4,691	57.73%
Republican	Craig A. Marvinney	3,435	42.27%
Total votes		8,126	100.00

=== General election ===
==== Results ====
General election results
Party	Candidate	Votes	%
Republican	Michael J. Gallagher	25,245	59.13%
Democratic	Ann Marie Donegan	17,449	40.87%
Total votes		42,694	100.00
Republican win (new seat)			

== District 6 ==
=== Democratic primary ===
==== Primary results ====
Democratic primary election results
Party	Candidate	Votes	%
Democratic	Frederick I. Taft	4,224	48.15%
Democratic	Ken Myers	3,021	34.44%
Democratic	Trevor K. Elkins	1,528	17.42%
Total votes		8,773	100.00

=== Republican primary ===
==== Primary results ====
Republican primary election results
Party	Candidate	Votes	%
Republican	Jack Schron	3,998	41.72%
Republican	Jim Crooks	2,670	27.86%
Republican	Sam P. Cannata	1,113	11.61%
Republican	Ed Hargate	936	9.77%
Republican	Don Sopka	886	9.04%
Total votes		9,583	100.00

=== General election ===
==== Results ====
General election results
Party	Candidate	Votes	%
Republican	Jack Schron	29,263	60.08%
Democratic	Frederick I. Taft	19,443	39.92%
Total votes		48,706	100.00
Republican win (new seat)			

== District 7 ==
=== Democratic primary ===
==== Primary results ====
Democratic primary election results
Party	Candidate	Votes	%
Democratic	Yvonne M. Conwell	2,215	35.53%
Democratic	Michael Leroy Nelson Sr.	1,385	22.21%
Democratic	James Levin	759	12.17%
Democratic	Timothy J. Russo	747	11.98%
Democratic	Clark Broida	527	8.45%
Democratic	James M. D'Amico	211	3.38%
Democratic	Dale Alan Smith	197	3.16%
Democratic	Victor L. Miller	134	2.15%
Democratic	Timothy Trogdon	60	0.96%
Total votes		6,235	100.00

=== Republican primary ===
==== Primary results ====
Republican primary election results
Party	Candidate	Votes	%
Republican	Phyllis Lucia Crespo	597	100.00%
Total votes		597	100.00

=== General election ===
==== Results ====
General election results
Party	Candidate	Votes	%
Democratic	Yvonne M. Conwell	15,895	77.35%
Republican	Phyllis Lucia Crespo	2,641	12.85%
Independent	Jeff Kipp	1,263	6.15%
Independent	Olga T. Sarbinowska	750	3.65%
Total votes		20,549	100.00
Democratic win (new seat)			

== District 8 ==
=== Democratic primary ===
==== Primary results ====
Democratic primary election results
Party	Candidate	Votes	%
Democratic	Pernel Jones Jr.	3,202	37.94%
Democratic	Gerald A. Cooper	2,106	24.95%
Democratic	Ronald Finnerty	705	8.35%
Democratic	John A. Boyd	686	8.13%
Democratic	Lacretia T. Bolden	643	7.62%
Democratic	Henry Warren Jr	490	5.81%
Democratic	Robin Poole	391	4.63%
Democratic	Brandon Johnson	217	2.57%
Total votes		8,440	100.00

=== Republican primary ===
==== Primary results ====
Republican primary election results
Party	Candidate	Votes	%
Republican	Andrew G. Plavny Sr.	965	100.00%
Total votes		965	100.00

=== General election ===
==== Results ====
General election results
Party	Candidate	Votes	%
Democratic	Pernel Jones Jr.	25,135	82.78%
Republican	Andrew G. Plavny Sr	3,819	12.58%
Independent	Gerald Henley	1,411	4.65%
Total votes		30,365	100.00
Democratic win (new seat)			

== District 9 ==
=== Democratic primary ===
==== Primary results ====
Democratic primary election results
Party	Candidate	Votes	%
Democratic	C. Ellen Connally	5,620	46.57%
Democratic	Danita Love	1,533	12.70%
Democratic	Kimberly F. Brown	1,450	12.02%
Democratic	Marcia L. McCoy	996	8.25%
Democratic	Patrice M. Brown	974	8.07%
Democratic	Donald A. Saunders	899	7.45%
Democratic	Sandra L. White	386	3.20%
Democratic	Isaac Powell	209	1.73%
Total votes		12,067	100.00

=== General election ===
==== Results ====
General election results
Party	Candidate	Votes	%
Democratic	C. Ellen Connally	33,493	84.63%
Independent	James Brady	4,604	11.63%
Independent	Laverne Jones Gore	1,480	3.74%
Total votes		39,577	100.00
Democratic win (new seat)			

== District 10 ==
=== Democratic primary ===
==== Primary results ====
Democratic primary election results
Party	Candidate	Votes	%
Democratic	Julian Rogers	2,859	27.77%
Democratic	Sharon Cole	2,346	22.78%
Democratic	Alan Rapoport	1,877	18.23%
Democratic	Barbara J. Thomas	1,806	17.54%
Democratic	Danny Williams	946	9.19%
Democratic	KC Petraitis	292	2.84%
Democratic	John Crist	171	1.66%
Total votes		10,297	100.00

=== Republican primary ===
==== Primary results ====
Republican primary election results
Party	Candidate	Votes	%
Republican	Matt Brakey	809	60.37%
Republican	Albert K. Oberst	531	39.63%
Total votes		1,340	100.00

=== General election ===
==== Results ====
General election results
Party	Candidate	Votes	%
Democratic	Julian Rogers	28,175	84.63%
Republican	Matt Brakey	3,972	12.01%
Independent	Michael Troy Watson	922	2.79%
Total votes		33,069	100.00
Democratic win (new seat)			

== District 11 ==
=== Democratic primary ===
==== Primary results ====
Democratic primary election results
Party	Candidate	Votes	%
Democratic	Sunny M. Simon	4,671	41.78%
Democratic	Phil Robinson	1,998	17.87%
Democratic	Philip R. Fine	1,130	10.11%
Democratic	Patrick McLaughlin	1,077	9.63%
Democratic	Jim Joyner	815	7.29%
Democratic	Nino Prodan	368	3.29%
Total votes		10,960	100.00

=== Republican primary ===
==== Primary results ====
Republican primary election results
Party	Candidate	Votes	%
Republican	Kathryn E. Gambatese	2,159	57.25%
Republican	Raymond J. Schmidlin Jr.	696	18.46%
Republican	Joe J. Liptow	573	15.19%
Republican	Gregory D. Smith	343	9.10%
Total votes		3,771	100.00

=== General election ===
==== Results ====
General election results
Party	Candidate	Votes	%
Democratic	Sunny M. Simon	28,301	68.37%
Republican	Kathryn E. Gambatese	11,408	27.56%
Independent	Rich Devor Jr.	1,684	4.07%
Total votes		41,393	100.00
Democratic win (new seat)			
