= Jennifer Brady (disambiguation) =

Jennifer Brady (born 1995) is an American tennis player.

Jennifer Brady may also refer to:

- Jennifer Brady (politician), member of the Ohio House of Representatives
- Jennifer Brady, a character in the 1989 film Ten Little Indians
