= 2014 Cuyahoga County Council election =

- November 4, 2014

7 of the 11 seats on the Cuyahoga County Council 6 seats needed for a majority
- Turnout: 39.6% ▼31.3 pp
	Majority party	Minority party
Party	Democratic	Republican
Last election	8	3
Seats won	8	3
Seat change	Steady	Steady
Popular vote	117,686	62,985
Percentage	65.1%	34.9%
Swing	▼10.0%	▲10.0%
- Results: Democratic hold Republican hold No election
President before election
C. Ellen Connally
Democratic
Elected President
Dan Brady
Democratic

The 2014 Cuyahoga County Council election was held on November 4, 2014 to elect members of the County Council of Cuyahoga County, Ohio. Odd-numbered districts were up for election to four-year terms, while District 10 held a special election after the resignation of Julian Rogers in 2013 to fill out the remainder of his term.

Republicans defended both of their seats up for election, while Democrats defended all 5 of theirs, maintaining the partisan balance in the chamber.

After the retirement of Council President C. Ellen Connally, District 3 Councilman Dan Brady was elected to the Council Presidency.

== District 1 ==
=== Democratic primary ===
==== Primary results ====
Democratic primary election results
Party	Candidate	Votes	%
	Write-in	1,282	100.00
Total votes		1,282	100.00

=== Republican primary ===
==== Primary results ====
Republican primary election results
Party	Candidate	Votes	%
Republican	Dave Greenspan (incumbent)	5,611	100.00%
Total votes		5,611	100.00

=== General election ===
==== Results ====
General election results
Party	Candidate	Votes	%	±%
Republican	Dave Greenspan (incumbent)	23,354	62.08%	+7.61%
Democratic	Mark Szabo	14,266	37.92%	−3.16%
Total votes		37,620	100.00	N/A
Republican hold				

== District 3 ==
=== Democratic primary ===
==== Primary results ====
Democratic primary election results
Party	Candidate	Votes	%
Democratic	Dan Brady (incumbent)	3,869	100.00%
Total votes		3,869	100.00

=== General election ===
==== Results ====
General election results
Party	Candidate	Votes	%	±%
Democratic	Dan Brady (incumbent)	12,248	100.00%	+30.99%
Total votes		12,248	100.00	N/A
Democratic hold				

== District 5 ==
=== Republican primary ===
==== Primary results ====
Republican primary election results
Party	Candidate	Votes	%
Republican	Michael J. Gallagher (incumbent)	5,664	100.00%
Total votes		5,664	100.00

=== General election ===
==== Results ====
General election results
Party	Candidate	Votes	%	±%
Republican	Michael J. Gallagher (incumbent)	23,713	100.00%	+40.87%
Total votes		23,713	100.00	N/A
Republican hold				

== District 7 ==
=== Democratic primary ===
==== Primary results ====
Democratic primary election results
Party	Candidate	Votes	%
Democratic	Yvonne M. Conwell (incumbent)	5,601	100.00%
Total votes		5,601	100.00

=== General election ===
==== Results ====
General election results
Party	Candidate	Votes	%	±%
Democratic	Yvonne M. Conwell (incumbent)	17,438	100.00%	+22.65%
Total votes		17,438	100.00	N/A
Democratic hold				

== District 9 ==
=== Democratic primary ===
==== Primary results ====
Democratic primary election results
Party	Candidate	Votes	%
Democratic	Shontel Brown	6,626	48.46%
Democratic	Lynn Ruffner	3,689	26.98%
Democratic	Donald A. Saunders	1,044	7.63%
Democratic	Leah Lewis	840	6.14%
Democratic	Lloyd D. Anderson	753	5.51%
Democratic	Andre P. White	722	5.28%
Total votes		13,674	100.00

=== Republican primary ===
==== Primary results ====
Republican primary election results
Party	Candidate	Votes	%
Republican	Adam Trumbo	1,274	100.00%
Total votes		1,274	100.00

=== General election ===
==== Results ====
General election results
Party	Candidate	Votes	%	±%
Democratic	Shontel Brown	26,978	80.50%	−4.13%
Republican	Adam Trumbo	6,535	19.50%	+19.50%
Total votes		33,513	100.00	N/A
Democratic hold				

== District 10 ==
=== General election ===
==== Results ====
General election results
Party	Candidate	Votes	%	±%
Democratic	Anthony T. Hairston (incumbent)	23,874	100.00%	+0.00%
Total votes		23,874	100.00	N/A
Democratic hold				

== District 11 ==
=== Democratic primary ===
==== Primary results ====
Democratic primary election results
Party	Candidate	Votes	%
Democratic	Sunny Simon (incumbent)	7,927	100.00%
Total votes		7,927	100.00

=== Republican primary ===
==== Primary results ====
Republican primary election results
Party	Candidate	Votes	%
Republican	John J. Currid	2,447	100.00%
Total votes		2,447	100.00

=== General election ===
==== Results ====
General election results
Party	Candidate	Votes	%	±%
Democratic	Sunny Simon	22,882	70.92%	+2.55%
Republican	John J. Currid	9,383	29.08%	+1.52%
Total votes		32,265	100.00	N/A
Democratic hold				
