= Senator Sinagra =

Senator Sinagra may refer to:

- Anthony Sinagra (born 1940), Ohio State Senate
- Jack Sinagra (1950–2013), New Jersey State Senate
