= Dave Greenspan =

American politician

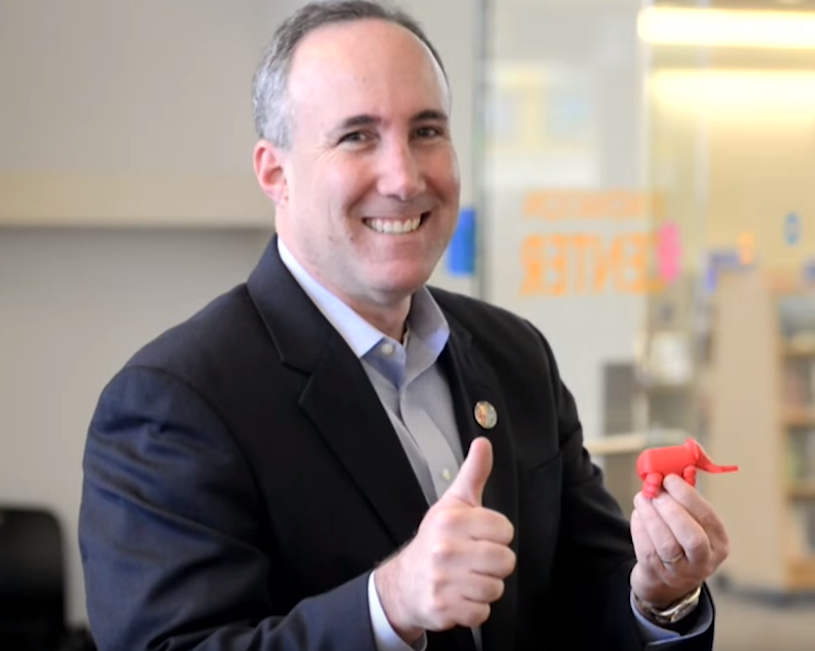
- Dave Greenspan with the Republican Party mascot

Member of the Ohio House of Representatives from the 16th District
- In office January 3, 2017 – December 31, 2020
- Preceded by: Nan Baker
- Succeeded by: Monique Smith

Personal details
- Born: August 7, 1965 (age 61)
- Party: Republican
- Education: Troy University (B.S.)
- Website: greenspanforohio.com

David S. Greenspan (born August 7, 1965) is an American politician and the city council president of Westlake, Ohio. He formerly served as a state representative for the 16th District of the Ohio House of Representatives and as a member of Cuyahoga County Council and Sandy Springs, Georgia City Council. He is a Republican.

== Life and career ==
Greenspan is a graduate of Troy University, where he majored in business and accounting. His career has been in communications and broadcasting, including with Atlanta Olympic Broadcasting, Turner Media Consultants, and the PGA TOUR Radio Network. Currently, Greenspan owns a small consulting agency focusing on start-up ventures.

Prior to moving to Cuyahoga County, Greenspan resided in Sandy Springs, Georgia, where he sat on their inaugural city council. He also sat on the inaugural Cuyahoga County Council, where he was chairman of the finance committee. He was elected in 2010 and again in 2014.

== Ohio House of Representatives ==
Long-serving state representative Nan Baker was term-limited in 2016 after four terms, leaving a potentially competitive district open. With Greenspan representing exactly the same territory on the county council, he opted to seek to the Republican nomination for the seat.

The race was deemed one of the most competitive of the cycle, with Democrat Tommy Greene raising considerable money and receiving numerous high-profile endorsements. However, in the end Greenspan kept the seat in the Republican column with a 56% to 44% win. He was re-elected in 2018 by defeating Democrat Cassimir Svigelj. In 2020, he was defeated by Democrat Monique Smith. The following spring, he began working as a lobbyist for the MetroHealth system.

Political offices
Preceded by Nan Baker	Ohio House of Representatives, 16th District; 2017–present	Succeeded by Monique Smith
