= James Flannery =

James Flannery may refer to:

- James Fortescue Flannery (1851–1943), English engineer, naval architect, and politician
- James Flannery (Ohio politician) (1938–2005), member of the Ohio House of Representatives
- James W. Flannery (born 1936), American producer, stage director, singer, scholar, critic
