= Bryan Flannery =

American politician (born 1967)

Member of the Ohio House of Representatives from the 17th district
- In office January 5, 1999 – December 31, 2002
- Preceded by: Dan Brady
- Succeeded by: Mike Skindell

Personal details
- Born: December 24, 1967 (age 58) Lakewood, Ohio, U.S.
- Party: Democratic
- Relations: James Flannery (father)

Bryan Flannery (born December 24, 1967) is an American politician who served as a member of the Ohio House of Representatives from 1999 to 2002. He was also a Democratic candidate for the 2006 Ohio gubernatorial election, losing to eventual winner Ted Strickland.

== Early life and education ==
Flannery was born in Lakewood, Ohio. Flannery's grandfather, Joseph E. Flannery, served as a member of the Cleveland City Council. His father, James Flannery, was a member of the Ohio House of Representatives from 1966 to 1972. Flannery was an all-Ohio tackle at St. Edward High School and also played on the 1988 Notre Dame Fighting Irish football team.

== Career ==
Flannery has worked in the oil, healthcare, and insurance industries. He also served as a member of the Lakewood City Council from 1994 to 1998. He was elected to the Ohio House of Representatives in November 1998 and assumed office in early-1999. Flannery served until 2002 and left office after redistricting. Flannery was the Democratic nominee for Ohio secretary of state, losing to incumbent Ken Blackwell. He was also a Democratic candidate for the 2006 Ohio gubernatorial election, losing to eventual winner Ted Strickland.

Flannery is a Democratic candidate for the 2021 Ohio's 11th congressional district special election. On March 4, 2021, Flannery participated in a virtual candidate forum hosted by the Jewish Democratic Council of America.

Party political offices
Preceded by Charleta Tavares	Democratic nominee for Ohio Secretary of State; 2002	Succeeded by Jennifer Brunner
Ohio House of Representatives
Preceded by Dan Brady	Member of the Ohio House from the 17th district 1999–2002	Succeeded by Mike Skindell
