= Monique Smith =

Monique Smith may refer to:

- Monique Smith (Canadian politician), member of the Legislative Assembly of Ontario
- Monique Smith (Ohio politician), member of the Ohio House of Representatives
- Monique Gray Smith, Canadian writer of children's and young adult literature
