= Nan Baker =

Republican politician (born 1954)

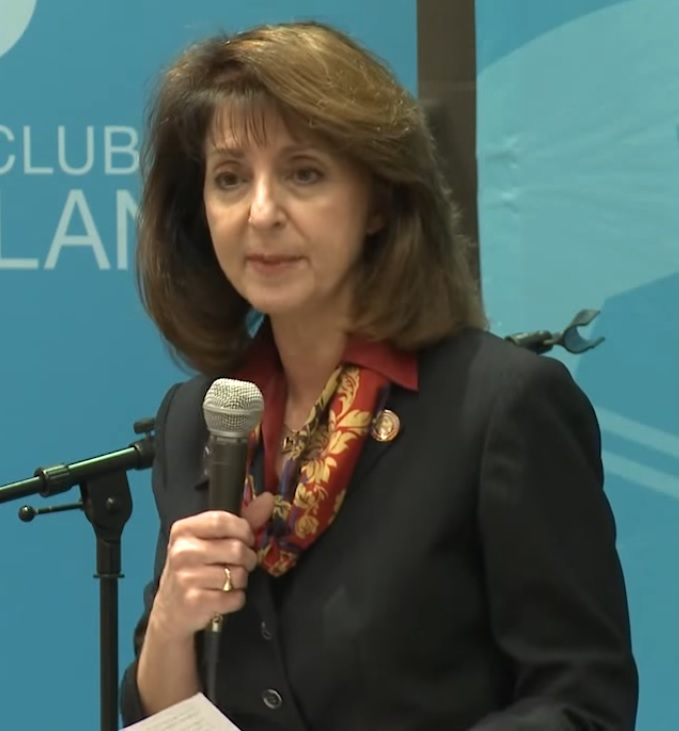

Member of the Cuyahoga County Council from the 1st district
- In office January 2, 2017 – January 2, 2023
- Preceded by: David Greenspan
- Succeeded by: Patrick Kelly

Member of the Ohio House of Representatives from the 16th district
- In office January 5, 2009 – December 31, 2016
- Preceded by: Jennifer Brady
- Succeeded by: David Greenspan

Personal details
- Born: December 3, 1954 (age 71) Cleveland, Ohio, U.S.
- Party: Republican
- Education: Baldwin Wallace College (AA, BA); Cleveland State University
- Profession: Businesswoman

Nan Baker (born December 3, 1954) is a Republican politician. Formerly, she represented the 16th district as a member of the Ohio House of Representatives from 2009 to 2016.

== Biography ==
Baker earned an AA in business from Lorain County Community College and a BA from Baldwin Wallace College. She is a graduate of the leadership academy at the Maxine Goodman Levin College of Urban Affairs at Cleveland State University, where she was awarded the David C. Sweet distinguished alumni award in 2006. She is married and has 3 children.

On November 4, 2008, Baker won election to the Ohio House of Representatives, defeating incumbent Jennifer Brady. A businesswoman, she was elected in 2008 with 50.9% of the vote and was re-elected in 2010. She won two more terms in 2012 and 2014 before being term limited in 2016.

== Committee Assignments in Ohio House of Representatives ==
2015 Session:

- Economic and Workforce Development
- Local Government
- Ways and Means

2013-2014 Session:

- Commerce, Labor, and Technology
- Economic Development and Regulatory Reform
- Ways and Means

2009-2010 Session:

- Education
- Economic Development and Regulatory Reform
- Housing and Urban Revitalization
- Local government/Public Administration
