= Shontel Brown =

American politician (born 1975)

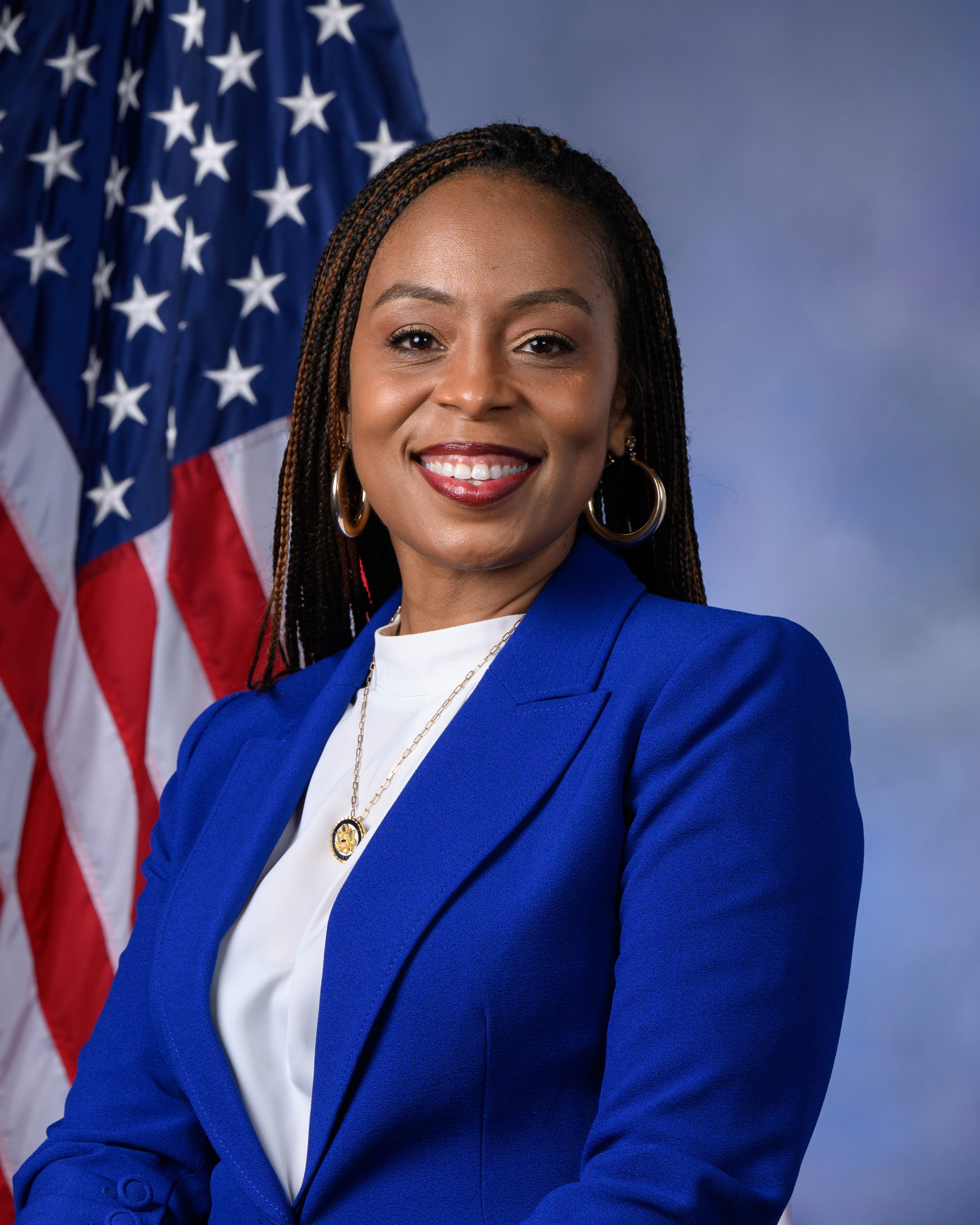
- Official portrait, 2025

Member of the U.S. House of Representatives from Ohio's 11th district
- Incumbent
- Assumed office November 2, 2021 (Note: Brown's official service begins on the date of the special election, while she was not sworn in until November 4, 2021.)
- Preceded by: Marcia Fudge

Member of the Cuyahoga County Council from the 9th district
- In office January 1, 2015 – November 4, 2021
- Preceded by: Ellen Connally
- Succeeded by: Meredith Turner

Personal details
- Born: Shontel Monique Brown; June 24, 1975 (age 51) Cleveland, Ohio, U.S.
- Party: Democratic
- Education: Cuyahoga Community College (AS); Wilberforce University (BS)
- Website: House website Campaign website
- Brown's voice Brown supporting the America COMPETES Act of 2022. Recorded March 31, 2022

Shontel Monique Brown (born June 24, 1975) is an American politician who has served as the U.S. representative for Ohio's 11th congressional district since 2021. A member of the Democratic Party, Brown previously served as a member of the Cuyahoga County Council, representing the 9th district.

Brown was first elected to Congress in a 2021 special election after Marcia Fudge resigned to become Secretary of Housing and Urban Development under President Joe Biden.

== Early life and education ==
Brown earned an Associate of Science degree in business management from Cuyahoga Community College. She also has a Bachelor of Science degree in organizational management from Wilberforce University.

== Career ==
Brown founded Diversified Digital Solutions, a marketing support company. She was elected to the Warrensville Heights City Council in 2011, where she held office for three years. In 2014, she was elected to the 9th District on the Cuyahoga County Council, succeeding Councilwoman C. Ellen Connally. Her district includes much of eastern Cuyahoga County, including Warrensville Heights, Bedford, Shaker Heights, Orange, and part of eastern Cleveland. In 2017, she was elected chair of the Cuyahoga County Democratic Party, defeating State Senator Sandra Williams and Newburgh Heights Mayor Trevor Elkins. Upon taking office, Brown became the first woman and the first African American to serve as Cuyahoga County Democratic party chair.

== U.S. House of Representatives ==
=== Elections ===
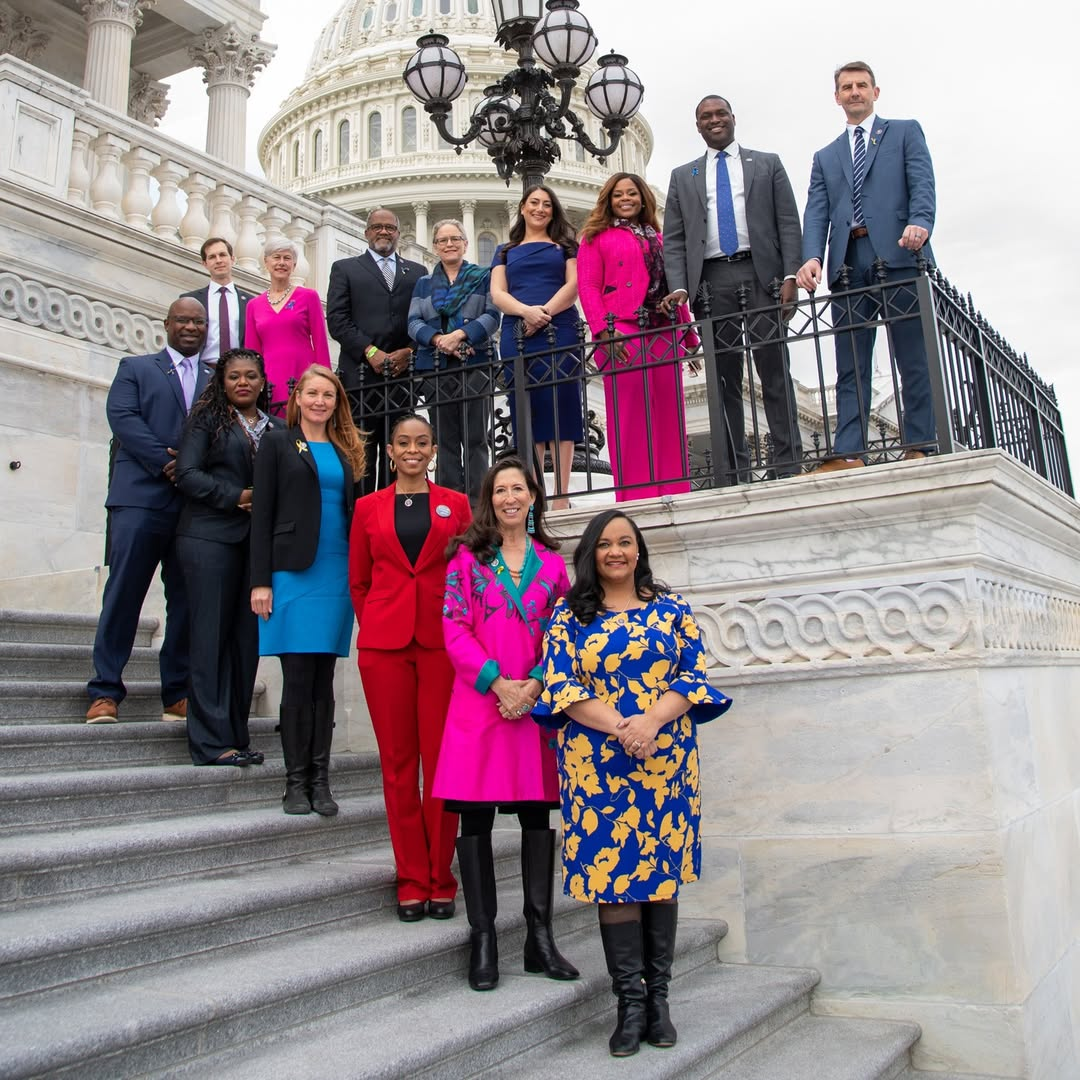
Brown and first-time members of the 117th Congress, 2022

==== 2021 special ====
On March 10, 2021, Marcia Fudge resigned her seat in the United States House of Representatives, after being confirmed by the United States Senate to serve as the Secretary of Housing and Urban Development in the Biden administration. Governor Mike DeWine set the primary date for August 3, concurrent with the special election in Ohio's 15th congressional district. The general election was on November 2. Shontel Brown won both the competitive Democratic primary and the general election, and was sworn in on November 4.

==== 2022 ====
Brown defeated former state Senator Nina Turner in the May 3, 2022, Democratic primary for the 11th district. She was endorsed by President Joe Biden and the Congressional Progressive Caucus; the Congressional Progressive Caucus had supported Turner in the Democratic primary for Ohio's 11th congressional district special election in 2021.

=== Committee assignments ===
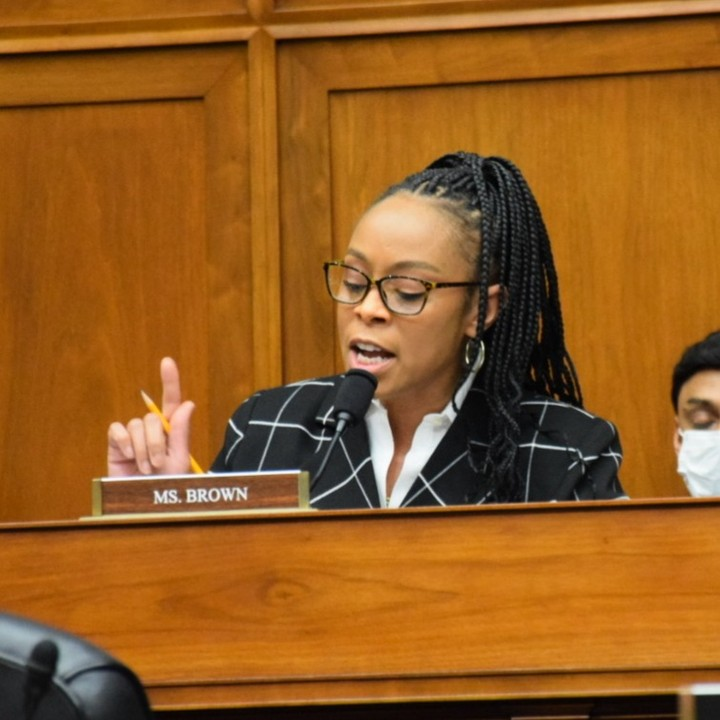
Brown discusses gun violence at oversight hearing, 2023

- Committee on Agriculture
- Committee on Oversight and Reform
- United States House Select Committee on Strategic Competition between the United States and the Chinese Communist Party

=== Caucus memberships ===
- Black Maternal Health Caucus
- Congressional Black Caucus
- Congressional Equality Caucus
- New Democrat Coalition
- Congressional Progressive Caucus
- Congressional Caucus for the Equal Rights Amendment

== Political positions ==
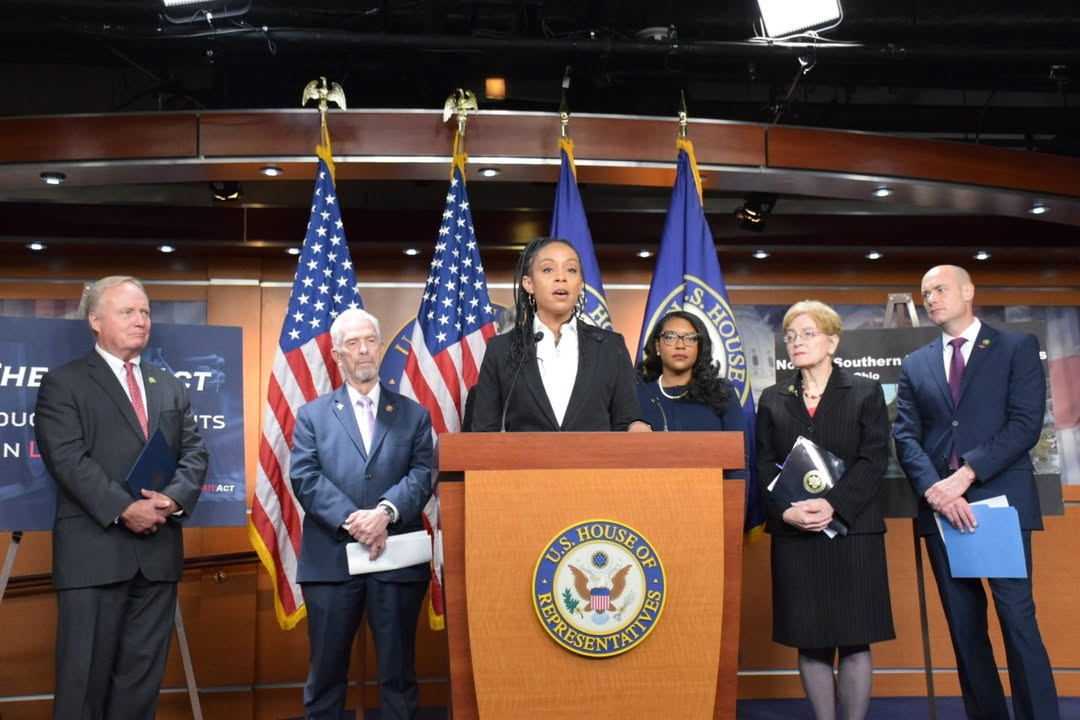
Brown announces the bipartisan Rail Act, 2023

As a U.S. representative, Brown supported the Build Back Better Act.

Brown voted to provide Israel with support following the October 7 attacks. Brown received 4.5 million dollars in campaign donations from pro-Israel sources.

== Personal life ==
Brown is a Baptist.

== Electoral history ==
=== 2021 Ohio's 11th congressional district special election ===
Democratic primary results
Party	Candidate	Votes	%
Democratic	Shontel Brown	38,505	50.11%
Democratic	Nina Turner	34,239	44.56%
Democratic	Jeff Johnson	1,388	1.81%
Democratic	John E. Barnes Jr.	801	1.04%
Democratic	Shirley Smith	599	0.78%
Democratic	Seth J. Corey	493	0.64%
Democratic	Pamela M. Pinkney	184	0.24%
Democratic	Will Knight	182	0.24%
Democratic	Tariq Shabazz	134	0.17%
Democratic	Martin Alexander	105	0.14%
Democratic	James Jerome Bell	101	0.13%
Democratic	Lateek Shabazz	61	0.08%
Democratic	Isaac Powell	52	0.07%
Total votes		76,844	100.0%

Ohio's 11th congressional district special election, 2021
Party	Candidate	Votes	%
Democratic	Shontel Brown	81,636	78.8%
Republican	Laverne Gore	21,929	21.2%
Total votes		103,565	100.0%

=== 2022 Ohio's 11th congressional district election ===
Democratic primary results
Party	Candidate	Votes	%
Democratic	Shontel Brown (incumbent)	40,517	66.5
Democratic	Nina Turner	20,395	33.5
Total votes		60,912	100.0

Ohio's 11th congressional district election, 2022
Party	Candidate	Votes	%
Democratic	Shontel Brown (incumbent)	167,722	77.8
Republican	Eric Brewer	47,988	22.2
Total votes		215,710	100.0

=== 2024 Ohio's 11th congressional district election ===
Democratic primary results
Party	Candidate	Votes	%
Democratic	Shontel Brown (incumbent)	61,573	100.0
Total votes		61,573	100.0

Ohio's 11th congressional district election, 2024
Party	Candidate	Votes	%
Democratic	Shontel Brown (incumbent)	236,883	78.3
Republican	Alan Rapoport	59,394	19.6
	Sean Freeman	6,107	2.0
Write-in	Tracy Deforde	27	0.0
Write-in	Christopher Zelonish	2	0.0
Total votes		302,413	100.0

== See also ==
- List of African-American United States representatives
- Women in the United States House of Representatives

U.S. House of Representatives
Preceded by Marcia Fudge	Member of the U.S. House of Representatives from Ohio's 11th congressional district 2021–present	Incumbent
U.S. order of precedence (ceremonial)
Preceded by Jake Ellzey	United States representatives by seniority 284th	Succeeded by Mike Carey
