= 1981 Cleveland mayoral election =

- November 3, 1981
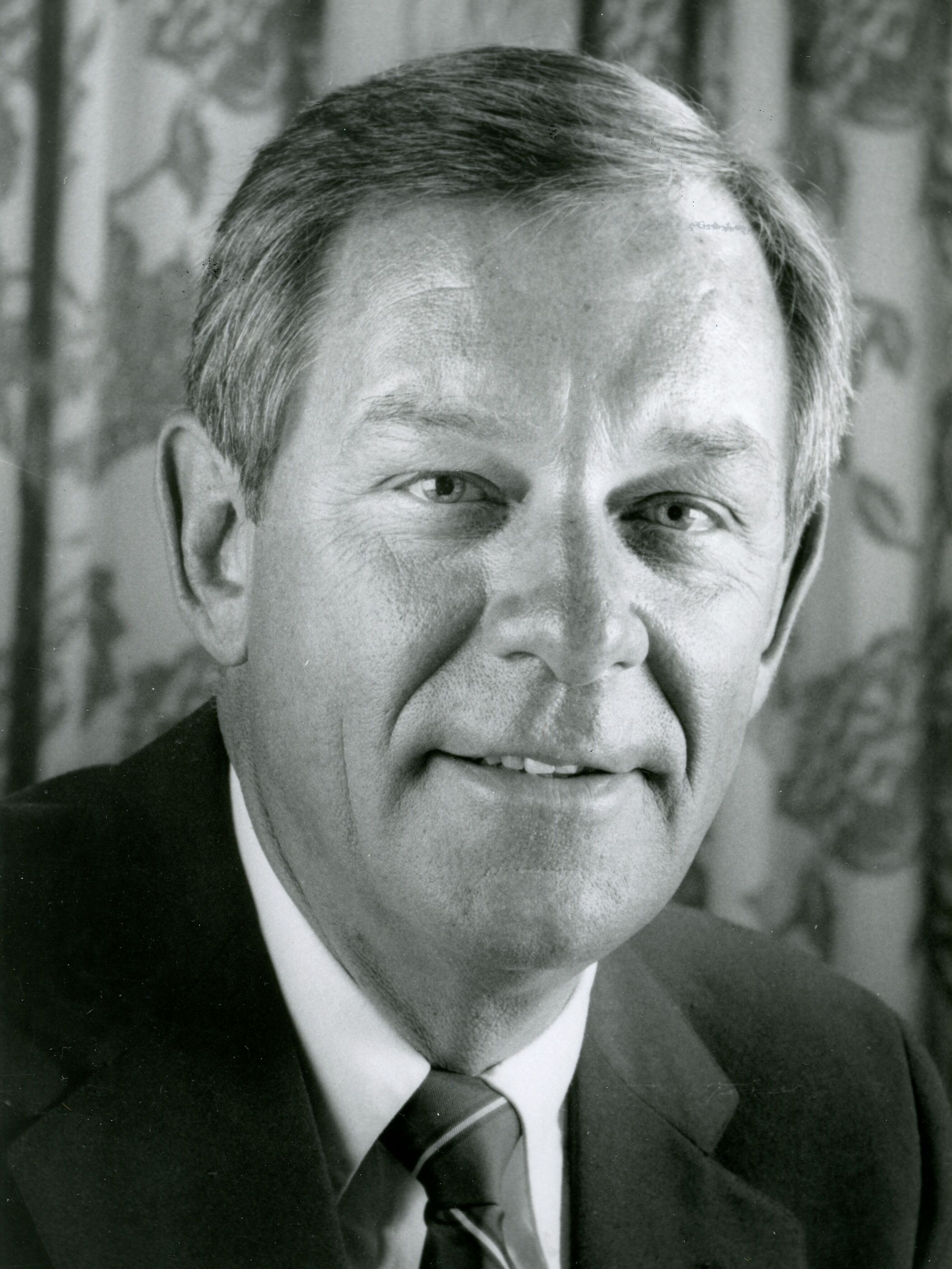

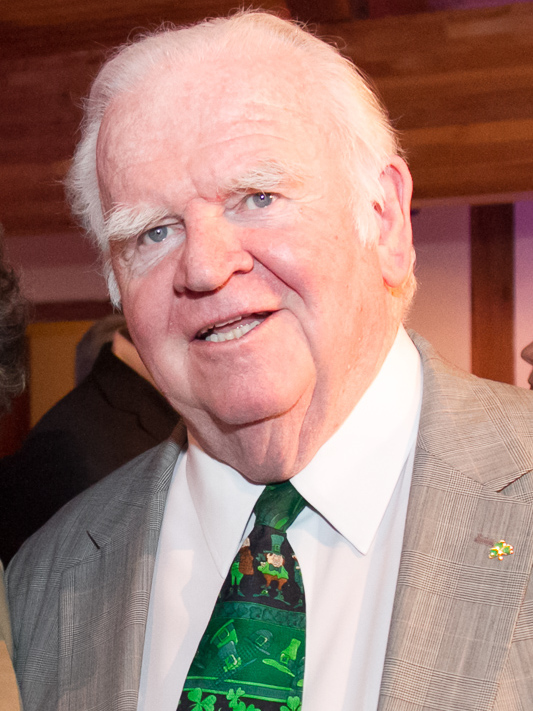
| Candidate | George Voinovich | Patrick Sweeney |
| Party | Nonpartisan | Nonpartisan |
| Popular vote | 107,472 | 32,940 |
| Percentage | 76.54% | 23.46% |
Mayor before election
George Voinovich
Republican
Elected mayor
George Voinovich
Republican

The 1981 Cleveland mayoral election took place on November 3, 1981, to elect the Mayor of Cleveland, Ohio. The election was officially nonpartisan, with the top two candidates from the September 29 primary advancing to the general election.

This was the first Cleveland mayoral election to a four-year term.

== Primary election ==
Primary election results
| Candidate | Votes | % |
|---|---|---|
| George Voinovich (incumbent) | 56,469 | 68.22% |
| Patrick Sweeney | 24,153 | 29.18% |
| Lynda Joyce | 1,527 | 1.85% |
| Rick Nagin | 622 | 0.75% |
| Total votes | 82,771 | |

== General election ==
Cleveland mayoral election, 1981
| Candidate | Votes | % |
|---|---|---|
| George Voinovich (incumbent) | 107,472 | 76.54% |
| Patrick Sweeney | 32,940 | 23.46% |
| Total votes | 140,412 | |
