= Michael J. Skindell =

American politician (born 1962)

Mike Skindell
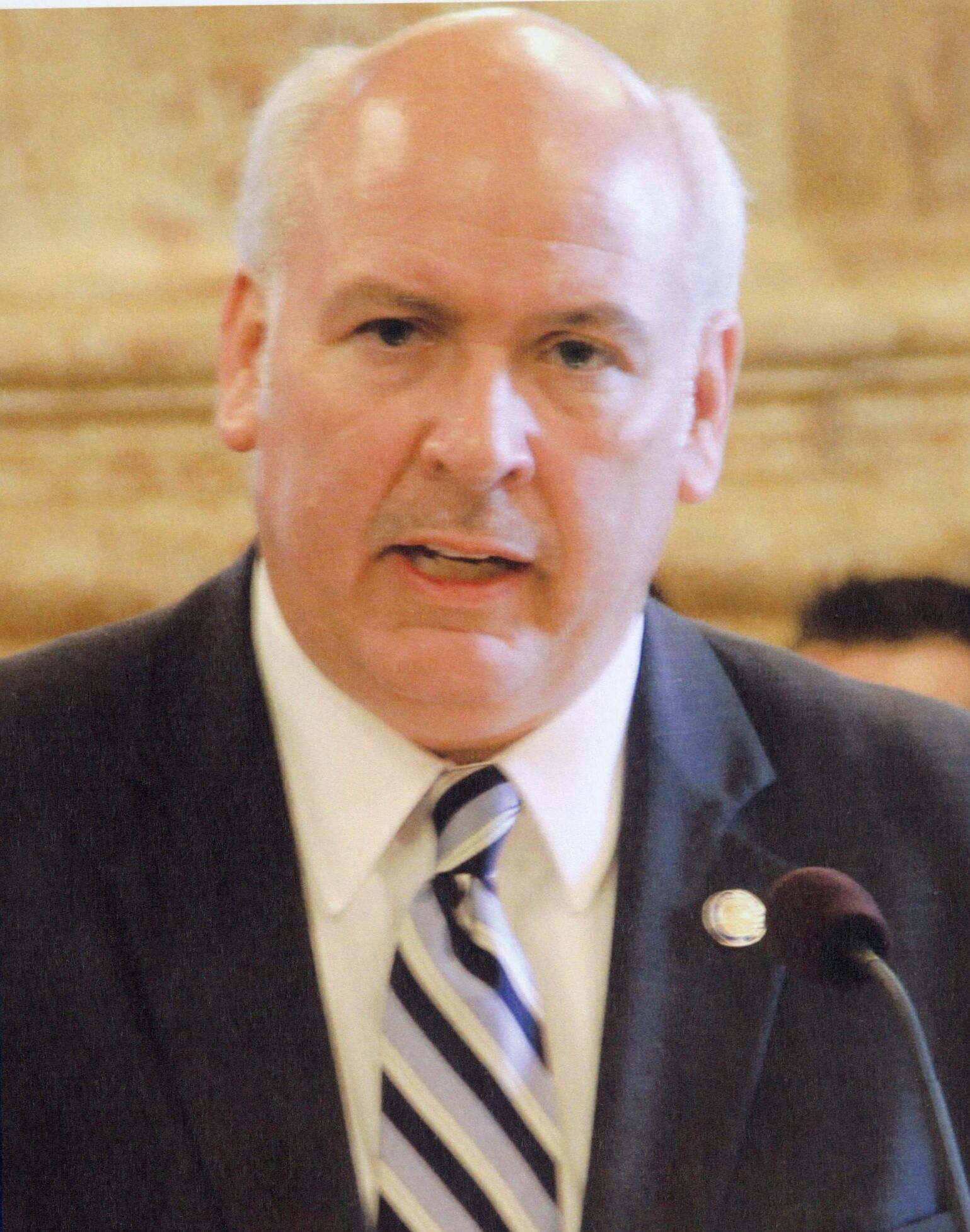

Member of the Ohio House of Representatives from the 13th district
- In office January 7, 2019 – December 31, 2024
- Preceded by: Nickie Antonio
- Succeeded by: Tristan Rader
- In office January 6, 2003 – December 31, 2010
- Preceded by: Mary Rose Oakar
- Succeeded by: Nickie Antonio

Member of the Ohio Senate from the 23rd district
- In office January 3, 2011 – December 31, 2018
- Preceded by: Dale Miller
- Succeeded by: Nickie Antonio

Personal details
- Born: August 31, 1962 (age 64)
- Party: Democratic
- Education: Walsh College (BA); Cleveland State University (JD)
- Occupation: Attorney

Michael J. Skindell (born August 31, 1962) is the former state representative for the 13th district of the Ohio House of Representatives after previously serving there from 2003 to 2010. He also previously served as the state senator for the 23rd district of the Ohio Senate from 2011 to 2018. He is a Democrat.

== Life and career ==
Skindell graduated from Walsh College (now Walsh University) in North Canton, Ohio, with a Bachelor of Arts in Business and Political Science in 1983. He received his Juris Doctor from the Cleveland State University College of Law in 1987.

He is a past president of the Lakewood Jaycees, and past Chairman of Lakewood Citizens Advisory Committee for Community Development Block Grant. He is a former Assistant Attorney General of Ohio, and former member of Lakewood City Council. In 2004, he received the award for Ohio Environmental Council Public Servant of the Year.

After an unsuccessful run in the primary election in 1996, Skindell was first elected to the Ohio House of Representatives in 2002 taking the place of Congresswoman Mary Rose Oakar who retired after serving one term in the State House.

Skindell ran unopposed in 2004 for a second term, and won a third in 2006 with 77.26% of the vote over Republican John Patrick Hildebrand. He won a fourth term in 2008 with 75.29% over Republican Mary Louise Kirk.

While serving in the Ohio House, Skindell encouraged adoption of a renewable energy portfolio standard in Ohio. The General Assembly passed Senate Bill 221, creating a standards program, in 2008 upon which Governor Ted Strickland signed the legislation.

In 2012, Skindell opted to run for the Ohio Supreme Court, but lost to incumbent Terrence O'Donnell 70% to 30%.

== Ohio Senate ==
Term limits prevented Skindell from seeking a fifth term in 2010. However, Senator Dale Miller did not run for another term, and Skindell was one of four who sought the Democratic nomination to replace him. Skindell won the nomination over former Rep. Ron Mottl Jr., Parma Councilman Nicholas Celebrezze and John Harmon with 46.82% of the vote. He won the general election easily with 60.77% of the electorate.

Skindell was sworn into his first term as Senator on January 3, 2011.

=== Committee assignments ===
- Civil Justice
- Finance
- Finance – Transportation Subcommittee (Ranking Minority Member)
- State and Local Government
- Technology and Innovation

== Electoral history ==
Ohio House of Representatives 13th District: 2018 to present
Year	Democratic	Votes	Pct	Republican	Votes	Pct
2020	Mike Skindell	33,647	74.33	Daniel Harrington	11,621	25.67%
2018	Mike Skindell	27,620	78.05	Jay R. Carson	7,769	21.95%

Mayor of Lakewood, OH: 2015
Year	Democratic	Votes	Pct	Democratic	Votes	Pct
2015	Mike Skindell	6,008	42.91	Michael P. Summers	7,994	57.09%

Ohio Senate 23rd District: 2010 to 2018
Year	Democrat	Votes	Pct	Republican	Votes	Pct
2014	Mike Skindell	44,221	62.37%	Tom Haren	26,684	37.63%
2010	Mike Skindell	49,406	60.77%	Dave Morris	31,892	39.23%

Ohio Supreme Court Associate Justice: 2012
Year	Democratic	Votes	Pct	Republican	Votes	Pct
2012	Mike Skindell	1,252,688	30.87%	Terrence O'Donnell	2,804,629	69.13%

Ohio House of Representatives 13th District: 2002 to 2010
Year	Democratic	Votes	Pct	Republican	Votes	Pct
2008	Mike Skindell	27,010	75.29%	Mary-Louise Kirk	8,865	24.71%
2006	Mike Skindell	19,943	77.26%	John Patrick Hildebrand Jr.	5,869	22.74%
2004	Mike Skindell	29,322	100.0%	Unopposed		
2002	Mike Skindell	13,241	63.86%	Ryan Dro	7,495	36.14%

== Personal life ==
Skindell is single and resides in Lakewood, Ohio.

== Controversy ==
In 2000, Skindell and Lakewood City Council colleague Nancy Roth introduced legislation to extend health and other benefits to unmarried couples. Public perception latched onto the legislation as a proxy for arguments over same-sex marriage and cultural change, with hundreds of people in attendance at a single committee hearing in January 2000. Other council members eventually rejected the proposal, 5-2.

Skindell led a Democratic effort to stop film tax credit legislation in 2008, drawing scorn from the Cleveland Plain Dealer. Studies at the time and since have found film tax credits’ fiscal and job benefits are negligible.

Skindell was a contrary voice within the Ohio House’s Democratic majority during 2009 budget battles. As a Budget Committee member, Skindell announced that he would vote against Democratic leaders’ budget without more resources for adult and child protective services and independent living centers for foster kids. During a later standoff between Democratic Governor Ted Strickland and Republican Senate President Bill Harris, Ohio House leadership passed a temporary budget; Skindell voted against the rare procedure, remarking that the temporary budget including 30% cuts "offers despair, not hope."

In 2015 and 2016, Skindell championed the cause of Lakewood Hospital against a plan to close the facility, supported by then-mayor Michael P. Summers and most of Lakewood City Council. Lakewood Hospital became a major political and legal controversy in the city, although the mayor and council ultimately pushed through the planned closure despite significant protest.
