= Patrick Sweeney (politician) =

American politician (1939–2020)

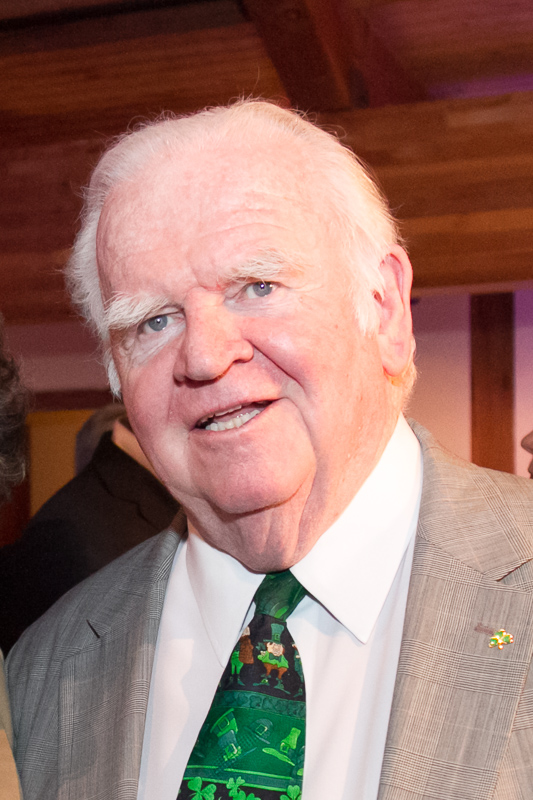
- Sweeney in 2016

Member of the Ohio Senate from the 23rd district
- In office January 6, 1997 – December 31, 1998
- Preceded by: Dennis Kucinich
- Succeeded by: Dan Brady

Member of the Ohio House of Representatives from the 19th district
- In office January 3, 1967 – January 2, 1997
- Preceded by: District established
- Succeeded by: Dale Miller

Personal details
- Born: September 2, 1939 Cleveland, Ohio, U.S.
- Died: September 7, 2020 (aged 81)
- Party: Democratic

Patrick Anthony Sweeney (September 2, 1939 – September 7, 2020) was an American politician serving as a Democratic member of the Ohio Senate from 1997 to 1998, and a member of the Ohio House of Representatives from 1967 to 1997. He was appointed in January 1997 to fill the vacancy caused by Dennis Kucinich, who was elected to Congress. However, in 1998 he opted to not run for election to his Senate seat, and he was succeeded by Dan Brady in 1999.

Sweeney held a master's degree from the John F. Kennedy School of Government and worked at Cleveland State University's Maxine Goodman Levin College of Urban Affairs as Assistant to the Vice President of Governmental Relations. Sweeney was also president of public policy advocacy firm PASCo Consultants.

Sweeney ran unsuccessfully in the 1981 Cleveland mayoral election.

Sweeney's wife, Emily Margaret Sweeney (née Mirsky), was formerly (1993-2003) the United States Attorney for The Northern District of Ohio. They have one daughter, Margaret Anne. Sweeney was born in Cleveland, Ohio and served in the United States Air Force. He died on September 7, 2020.
