= Charles L. Butts =

American politician (born 1942)

Charles Butts
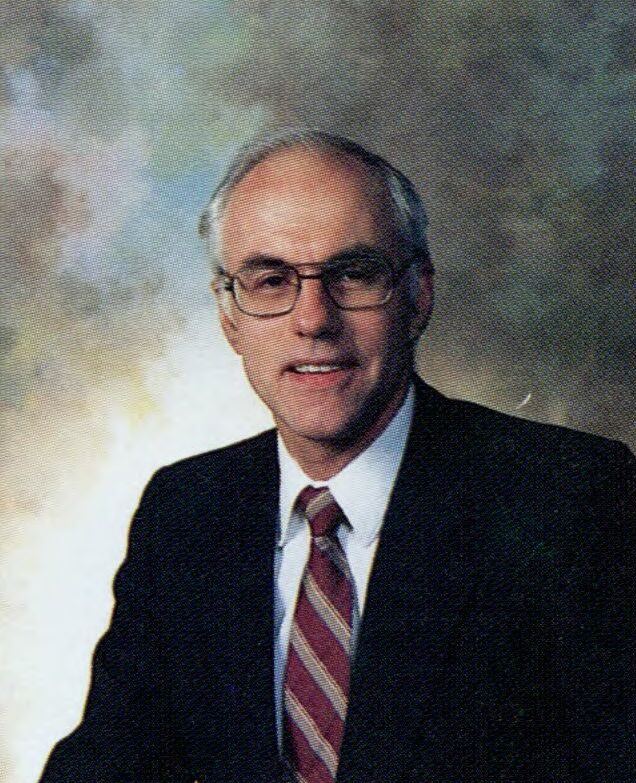

Member of the Ohio Senate from the 23rd district
- In office January 3, 1975 – December 31, 1990
- Preceded by: Anthony F. Novak
- Succeeded by: Anthony Sinagra

Personal details
- Born: February 16, 1942 (age 84) Hartford, Connecticut, United States
- Party: Democratic

Charles Lewis "Charlie" Butts (born February 16, 1942) is a former Democratic politician, who served as a member of the Ohio Senate from 1975 to 1990.

== Education and early career ==
Butts attended Oberlin high school then Oberlin College in Ohio. He took a break from Oberlin from the summer of 1962 to 1964 to work as a journalist in Mississippi for the civil rights movement. He returned to Oberlin to finish college, earning a Bachelor of Arts degree in Government in 1967. By then, he had married his wife, Alice (née Gould). Together, they had four children: John, Paul, Joanna, and Helen.

Butts worked on the 1964 and 1967 election campaigns for Carl Stokes, who was in the Ohio House of Representatives and became the first black elected mayor of a major U.S. city.

== Political career ==
Butts served in the 23rd District from 1975 until 1990. Butts originally defeated Republican Senator Anthony F. Novak in 1974 to take a seat in the Senate, which represented the near westside of Cleveland at the time, including parts of the Detroit-Shoreway and Ohio City neighborhoods. He was reelected in 1978, 1982, and 1986.

After the 1980 elections, Butts was elected as minority whip, and was elected as assistant president pro-tempore in 1982. Butts served on the Ways and Means Committee, Energy and Public Utilities, and the Rules Committees. He was appointed Chairman of the Elections, Financial Institutions and Insurance Committee, as well as chairman of the Public Improvements Inspection Committee.

Butts was generally known as a hard working legislator, but he also could antagonize opponents, once considered of the "worst" legislators by Cincinnati magazine. The 23rd Senate District would later be gerrymandered, expanding westward to include the eastern portions of Lakewood. In 1990, Butts was defeated for reelection by former Lakewood mayor Anthony Sinagra.

=== 1979 mayoral campaign ===
In April 1979, Butts announced that he would enter the 1979 Cleveland mayoral election, challenging fellow Democrat, the beleaguered incumbent Dennis Kucinich. Kuicinich was considered vulnerable, having narrowly survived a recall election the year before by just over 200 votes out of more than 120,000 votes. The field quickly grew in July with additions of city council majority leader Basil Russo and Republican George Voinovich, who was Lieutenant Governor of Ohio. Also, Thabo L. Ntweng of the socialist worker's party would also join the race.

One of Butts' top senate aides, A. Lamont Eanes, helped run the 1979 mayoral campaign. Eanes would eventually be nominated by President Barack Obama as deputy Social Security administrator in 2014 Butts would finish fourth in the nonpartisan primary in the crowded field, garnering a respectable 19,431 votes, or 15.28%, behind eventual winner Voinovich, Kuicinich, and Russo.

== After politics ==
As of 2015, Butts was a managing director for a blog, Takingonthegiant.com, which chronicles the work of creative young people who want to change the world.
