= Jennifer Brady (politician) =

American politician

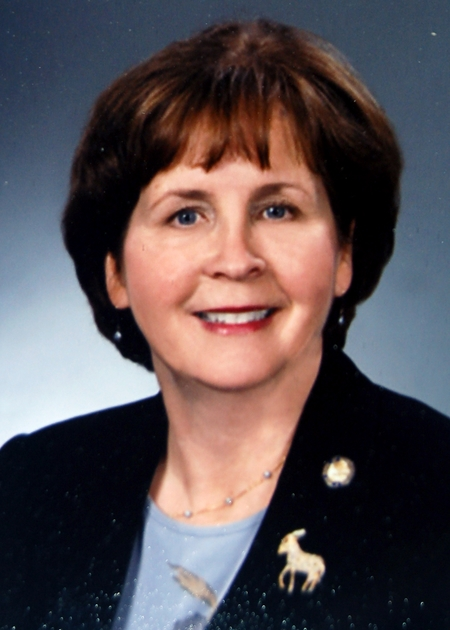

Member of the Ohio House of Representatives from the 16th district
- In office January 2, 2007 – December 31, 2008
- Preceded by: Sally Conway Kilbane
- Succeeded by: Nan Baker

Personal details
- Party: Democratic
- Education: University of Dayton

Jennifer Brady is a former Democratic member of the Ohio House of Representatives, representing the 16th District from 2007 to 2009. Brady is a former member of the Ohio Legislative Black Caucus.
