= Anthony Sinagra =

American politician

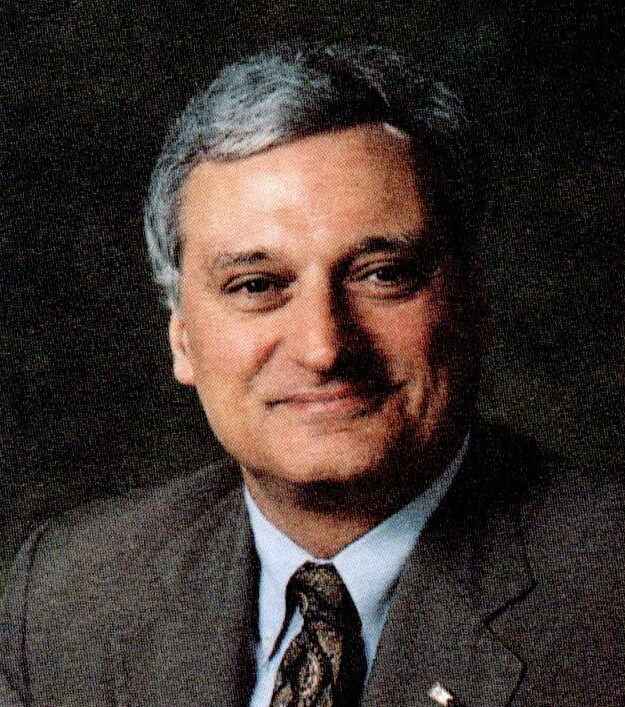

Member of the Ohio Senate from the 23rd district
- In office January 3, 1991 – December 31, 1994
- Preceded by: Chuck Butts
- Succeeded by: Dennis Kucinich

Personal details
- Party: Republican

Anthony Sinagra (born 1940) is an American Republican politician in Cuyahoga County. He was the city prosecutor and mayor of Lakewood, Ohio, and member of the Ohio Senate. He served in the 23rd District, which represented the western suburbs of Cuyahoga County, from 1991 until 1994, when he lost to Dennis Kucinich in an electoral upset. He was also mayor of Lakewood from 1978 to 1990.

In 2009, he was accused of paying bribes to obtain a consulting job for which he did little or no work. On September 1, 2009, he pleaded guilty to the charges and was subsequently fined.
