= Dale Miller (politician) =

American politician (born 1949)

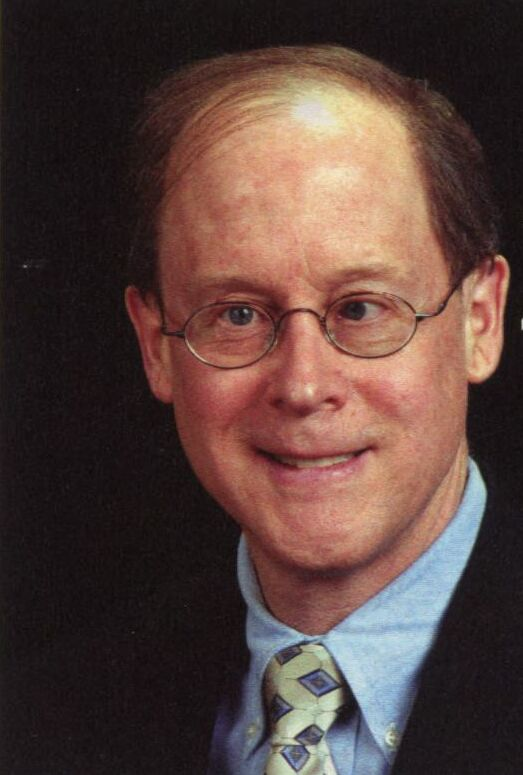

Member of the Cuyahoga County Council from the 2nd district
- Incumbent
- Assumed office January 1, 2011

Member of the Ohio Senate from the 23rd district
- In office February 28, 2006 – December 31, 2010
- Preceded by: Dan Brady
- Succeeded by: Mike Skindell

Member of the Ohio House of Representatives from the 14th district
- In office January 3, 1997 – February 28, 2006
- Preceded by: Patrick Sweeney
- Succeeded by: Mike Foley

Personal details
- Born: September 16, 1949 (age 77) Cleveland, Ohio, U.S.
- Party: Democratic
- Spouse: Carol
- Education: Case Western Reserve University, University of Utah
- Profession: Psychologist

Dale Miller (born September 16, 1949) is a politician from the U.S. state of Ohio. He is a Democratic member of the Cuyahoga County Council, serving since January 1, 2011. He served in the Ohio Senate from 2006 to 2010, and in the Ohio House of Representatives from 1997 to 2006. He also was a member of Cleveland City Council from 1979 to 1997.

== Life and career ==
In 1976, Miller received his PhD in Clinical Psychology from the University of Utah, after obtaining his MS in Clinical Psychology from the University of Utah in 1974, and his BS in Psychology from Case Western Reserve University in 1971. He was involved politically starting in college, where he interned for United States Senator Howard Metzenbaum.

Miller was elected to Cleveland City Council in 1979, serving alongside then-Mayor Dennis Kucinich, and was reelected eight times. In 1997, when longtime Representative Patrick Sweeney was appointed to the Ohio Senate, Miller sought to replace him in the Ohio House of Representatives. He won the appointment, and was seated on January 3, 1997. He won election to his own term in 1998, defeating his Republican opponent with 72.02% of the vote. He won reelection again in 2000, 2002 and 2004. He served as assistant minority whip and minority whip during his tenure in the House.

In 2006, Senator Dan Brady resigned from his seat in the Ohio Senate, allowing for an appointment to be made by Senate Democrats. Miller sought appointment to the upper chamber. He won the appointment, and was seated on February 23, 2006. He won a full term in 2006, with 67.96% of the vote. In the 128th Ohio General Assembly, Miller served as the ranking minority member of the Senate Finance Committee.

== Cuyahoga County Council ==
Instead of seeking a second full term in the Ohio Senate in 2010, Miller ran for the inaugural Cuyahoga County Council. He won with 59.2% of the electorate against four other candidates.

Miller was sworn into office on January 1, 2011. He is the chairman of the Finance and Budgeting Committee.

Has announced he will pursue a 2020 re-election bid.
