= Dan Brady (Ohio politician) =

American politician

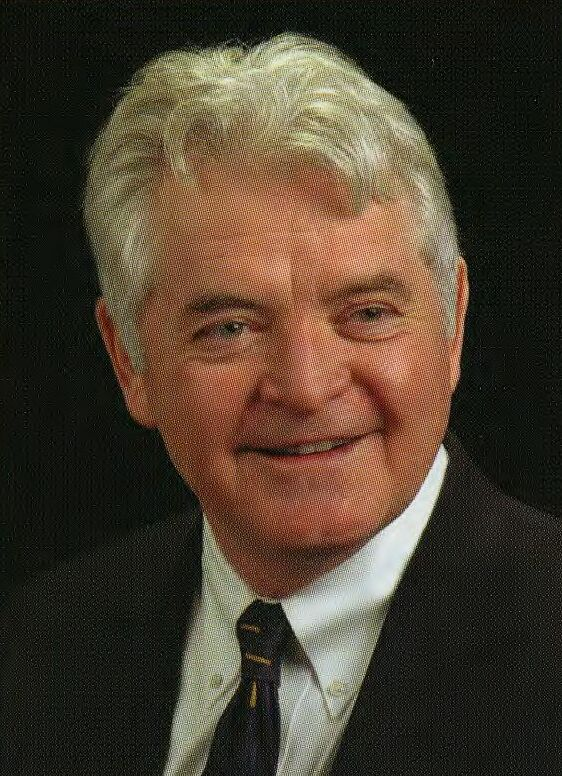

Member of the Ohio Senate from the 23rd district
- In office January 5, 1999 – February 28, 2006
- Preceded by: Patrick Sweeney
- Succeeded by: Dale Miller

Member of the Ohio House of Representatives from the 17th district
- In office January 6, 1996 – December 31, 1998
- Preceded by: Madeline Cain
- Succeeded by: Bryan Flannery

Personal details
- Party: Democratic

Daniel R. Brady of Cleveland, Ohio, is an American politician of the Democratic party. Brady holds a bachelor of arts degree in history and political science from Ohio University. An early staff member of Ohio Citizen Action, Brady was a member of the Cleveland City Council from 1986 to 1996. Brady was elected to the Ohio House of Representatives in 1996 and served one term. He was elected to the Ohio Senate in 1998. In 2001, he was elected Senate minority whip by the Democratic caucus. In 2010 he was elected to the inaugural Cuyahoga County Council representing the 3rd District on Cleveland's near west side.

== Cleveland City Council ==
Brady was a three-term councilman, serving from 1986 to 1996. As a council member, Mr. Brady was an advocate for the expansion of the Cleveland Public Power (CPP) system. As chairman of the city of Cleveland's Public Utilities Committee from 1990 to 1996, he provided oversight for the expansion of CPP – the largest of its kind in the United States.

Mr. Brady also negotiated the city of Cleveland's Cable Franchise agreement making provisions for five Public-access television cable TV channels and insured funding for broadcasting of Public, educational, and government access (PEG) channel programming. He has also served on the Finance, Safety, Health, Rules, Community Development, and City Planning committees.

== Ohio House of Representatives District 17 ==
Former District 17 included all of Lakewood and several west-side Cleveland wards. While serving in the minority of the Ohio House he secured $250,000 for The Beck Center For The Performing Arts.

Dan Brady opposed further reforms to the workers' compensation insurance system that would have reduced or eliminated benefits to injured workers. Brady opposed the Rebuttable Presumption Bill (House Bill 122) that assumed an injured worker who refused to take a drug and alcohol test up to 36 hours following an accident was at fault and automatically lost his or her benefits.

Dan Brady also supported the Ohio Supreme Court in its upholding of workers' rights when it ruled against anti-labor legislation. Brady campaigned across Ohio to re-elect Justice Resnick against millions in undisclosed out-of-state corporate money. Brady also led the fight against the legislative immunity amendment slipped into the budget bill (HB 94).

== Ohio State Senate District 23 ==
Mr. Brady served as an officer of the Ohio Senate as Assistant Minority Leader of the Democratic caucus. In July 2000, the Governor of Ohio signed Dan's Safe Needle Legislation into law. Serving in the minority Dan was one of few Democratic legislators to pass significant legislation. SB 181 protected thousands of health care workers who are put at risk of getting deadly HIV or hepatitis when accidentally stuck with unsafe needles. The bill mandated the use of retracting needles in Ohio's medical facilities.

He also served on the following committees: Finance & Financial Institution's, Education, Health, Human Services and Aging, Judiciary Committee on Civil Justice, Rules, Highways and Transportation and the Joint Legislative Ethic's Committee. In addition, he was the Ranking Minority Member for the Natural Resources and Environment Committee, Insurance Commerce & Labor as well as the State and Local Government Committee.

== Cuyahoga County Council ==
In 2010, Brady was first elected to the then newly formed Cuyahoga County Council. He would then be reelected in 2014 and 2018, and is now in his third term. He became council president in 2015.

== Family ==
Dan's wife Dona Brady (with whom he's been married to since 1987) was a member of Cleveland City Council, holding Dan's old seat that he vacated when he became an Ohio state representative (meaning that same seat has been held by a Brady - sans the period between Dan vacating the seat and Dona winning the succeeding special election - from 1986 to Dona's resignation in 2020).

The Bradys have a daughter named Kelly, and a grandson named Jonathan.

Party political offices
Preceded by Sherrod Brown	Democratic nominee for Ohio Secretary of State; 1994	Succeeded by Charleta Tavares
