= Cuyahoga County Council =

Governing body for Cuyahoga County, Ohio

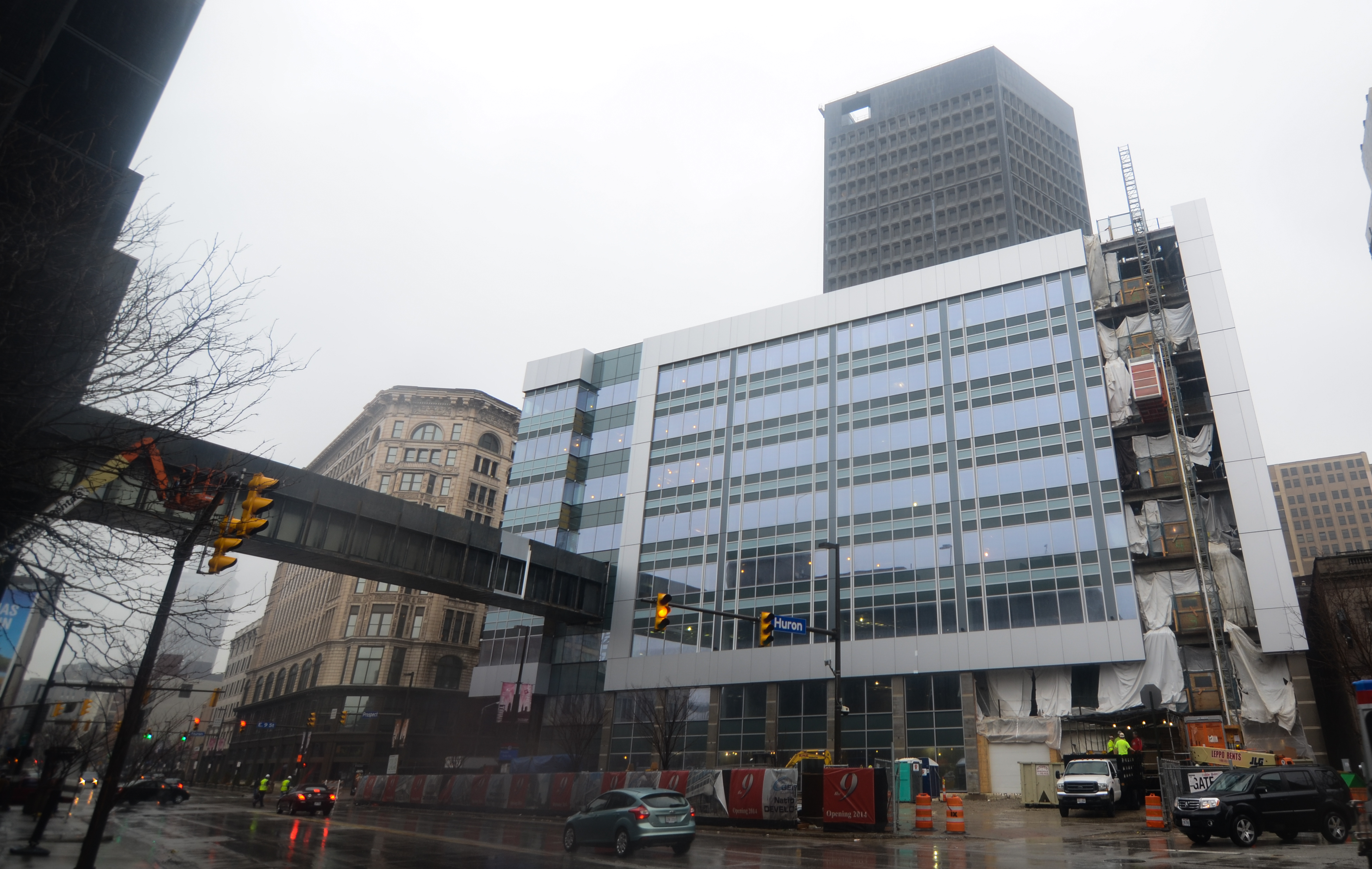
Cuyahoga County Administrative Headquarters in Downtown Cleveland, under construction in 2014

The Cuyahoga County Council is the legislative branch of the government of Cuyahoga County in Ohio. Cuyahoga, along with Summit, is one of only two of Ohio's 88 counties not governed by a three-member commission. The council and county executive position were created by means of a charter approved by the county's electorate on November 3, 2009, and became effective January 1, 2011.

The Council meets in the C. Ellen Connally Council Chambers at the Cuyahoga County Administrative Headquarters at 2079 E. 9th Street in Cleveland, Ohio. The chambers are named for C. Ellen Connally, a former Cleveland Municipal Court judge who was elected the county council's first president in 2011.

== Elections ==
Map of the 11 districts of Cuyahoga County Council, in effect since 2011

Council members are elected to four-year terms. The size of the council is fixed at 11. Districts are re-evaluated following each decennial federal census in order to reflect shifts in population.

A candidate for the office of council member must have been a registered voter of Cuyahoga County for at least the two years immediately prior to filing a declaration of candidacy. Additionally, the candidate must have been a resident of their council district for at least 30 days immediately prior to filing a declaration of candidacy. Once elected or appointed, a council member must continue to reside within their district throughout their term. If redistricting occurs during mid-term, and a council member is redistricted outside their district, the council member is not disqualified from office until the term ends.

== Council members ==
For the initial election for county council in November 2010, candidates in districts 1, 3, 5, 7, 9, and 11 were elected to four-year terms, to commence January 1, 2011. Candidates in districts 2, 4, 6, 8, and 10 were elected to two-year terms, to commence January 1, 2011. Candidates in districts 2, 4, 6, 8, and 10 were elected to full four-year terms in November 2012, to commence January 1, 2013. Beginning with the 2012 general election, the term for each member of Council shall be four years.

As of May 2025, council members were:

District	Name	Party	Notes	Term expires (Note: Each term begins on January 1 of the year after a general election.)
1	Patrick J. Kelly	D		2026
2	Dale Miller	D	President	2029
3	Martin J. Sweeney	D		2026
4	Mark Casselberry	D		2029
5	Michael J. Gallagher	R		2026
6	Robert Schleper	D		2029
7	Yvonne M. Conwell	D	Vice President	2026
8	Pernel Jones, Jr.	D		2029
9	Meredith M. Turner	D		2026
10	Michael J. Houser, Sr.	D		2029
11	Sunny M. Simon	D		2026

=== Vacancies ===
When a vacancy of any kind occurs on the council, and the seat was held by an individual belonging to a political party, that party may choose a replacement within 30 days after the vacancy occurs. If the political party fails to act, the council itself may make the appointment. If the council fails to act, the county executive must make the appointment.

When a vacancy of any kind occurs on the council, and the seat was held by an individual who did not belong to a political party, the council may choose a replacement within 30 days after the vacancy occurs. If the council fails to act, the county executive must make the appointment.

If the vacancy occurs in the first or second year of the council member's term, the appointment may last only until the next countywide general election. The winning candidate in that election will serve out the remainder of the unexpired term. If the vacancy occurs in the third or fourth year of the council member's term, the appointment may last only until the next countywide general election. The winning candidate in that election will serve out a full four-year term.

Appointed members of the council must meet the residency requirements of a regularly-elected council member.

== See also ==
- County Executive of Cuyahoga County, Ohio
