= National Register of Historic Places listings in Sandusky County, Ohio =

Location of Sandusky County in Ohio

This is a list of the National Register of Historic Places listings in Sandusky County, Ohio.

This is intended to be a complete list of the properties and districts on the National Register of Historic Places in Sandusky County, Ohio, United States. The locations of National Register properties and districts for which the latitude and longitude coordinates are included below, may be seen in a Google map.

There are 12 properties and districts listed on the National Register in the county, including 1 National Historic Landmark. Another property was once listed but has been removed.

This National Park Service list is complete through NPS recent listings posted March 14, 2025.

== Current listings ==
	Name on the Register	Image	Date listed	Location	City or town	Description
1	Joseph and Rachel Bartlett House	Joseph and Rachel Bartlett House	March 21, 1990 (#90000388)	212 S. Park Ave. 41°20′42″N 83°07′03″W	Fremont	
2	Ralph P. Buckland House	Ralph P. Buckland House	December 17, 1974 (#74001620)	300 S. Park Ave. 41°20′38″N 83°07′04″W	Fremont	
3	Georg Cronenwett House	Georg Cronenwett House	December 1, 1978 (#78002184)	606 W. Main St. 41°27′11″N 83°22′07″W	Woodville	
4	Frederick Fabing House	Frederick Fabing House	May 26, 1983 (#83002054)	201 S. Park Ave. 41°20′43″N 83°07′01″W	Fremont	
5	Rutherford B. Hayes House	Rutherford B. Hayes House	October 15, 1966 (#66000624)	Hayes and Buckland Aves. 41°20′27″N 83°07′50″W	Fremont	
6	Christopher C. Layman Law Office	Christopher C. Layman Law Office	May 15, 1986 (#86001062)	212 W. 1st St. 41°27′08″N 83°21′52″W	Woodville	
7	Maj. Gen. James B. McPherson House	Maj. Gen. James B. McPherson House	October 18, 1974 (#74001619)	300 E. McPherson Highway; 41°18′31″N 82°58′17″W	Clyde	
8	Mull Covered Bridge	Mull Covered Bridge	October 15, 1974 (#74001618)	East of Burgoon between State Routes 12 and 53; 41°15′39″N 83°11′04″W	Ballville Township	
9	Overmyer-Waggoner-Roush Farm	Overmyer-Waggoner-Roush Farm	September 8, 1983 (#83002055)	654 S. Main St. 41°24′39″N 83°13′18″W	Lindsey	
10	St. Paul's Episcopal Church	St. Paul's Episcopal Church	June 9, 1977 (#77001085)	200 N. Park Ave. 41°20′51″N 83°07′03″W	Fremont	
11	Sandusky County Jail and Sheriff's House	Sandusky County Jail and Sheriff's House	February 27, 1997 (#97000198)	622 Croghan St. 41°20′49″N 83°07′06″W	Fremont	
12	Soldiers Memorial Parkway and McKinley Memorial Parkway	Soldiers Memorial Parkway and McKinley Memorial Parkway	January 25, 1991 (#90002212)	Soldiers Memorial Parkway and McKinley Memorial Parkway; 41°20′24″N 83°07′59″W	Fremont	

== Former listing ==
	Name on the Register	Image	Date listed	Date removed	Location	City or town	Description
1	Fremont City Hall		August 30, 1978 (#78002183)	February 20, 1980	401 Croghan St.	Fremont	Demolished on August 31, 1979.

== See also ==
- List of National Historic Landmarks in Ohio
- Listings in neighboring counties: Erie, Huron, Ottawa, Seneca, Wood
- National Register of Historic Places listings in Ohio
