= Bartlett House =

Bartlett House may refer to:

in the United States

(by state, then city/town)

- Samuel L. Bartlett House, Phoenix, Arizona, listed on the National Register of Historic Places (NRHP) in Maricopa County
- Bartlett-Kirk House, Batesville, Arkansas, listed on the NRHP in Independence County
- Daniel and Esther Bartlett House, Redding, Connecticut, listed on the NRHP in Fairfield County
- Call-Bartlett House, Arlington, Massachusetts, listed on the NRHP in Middlesex County
- Bartlett-Russell-Hedge House, Plymouth, Massachusetts, listed on the NRHP in Plymouth County
- J.C. Bartlett House, Taunton, Massachusetts, listed on the NRHP in Bristol County
- Thomas and Maria Blackman Bartlett House, Cherry Hill, Michigan, listed on the NRHP in Wayne County
- Francis H. Bartlett House, Wykoff, Minnesota, listed on the NRHP in Fillmore County
- Jack Bartlett House, Bozeman, Montana, listed on the NRHP in Gallatin County
- John J. and Lenora Bartlett House, Kearney, Nebraska, listed on the NRHP in Buffalo County
- George A. Bartlett House, Tonopah, Nevada, listed on the NRHP in Nye County
- Bartlett-Rockhill-Bartlett House, Tuckerton, New Jersey, listed on the NRHP in Ocean County
- Bartlett House (Ghent, New York), listed on the NRHP in Columbia County
- Josiah Bartlett House, Kingston, New Hampshire, listed on the NRHP in Rockingham County
- Joseph and Rachel Bartlett House, Fremont, Ohio, listed on the NRHP in Sandusky County
- Robert Rensselaer Bartlett House, Astoria, Oregon, listed on the NRHP in Clatsop County
- L.L. Bartlett House, Stoneville, South Dakota, listed on the NRHP in Meade County
- Peter Bartlett House, Maryville, Tennessee, listed on the NRHP in Blount County
- Frank Bartlett House, Port Townsend, Washington, listed on the NRHP in Jefferson County
