= Damschroder =

Damschroder is a surname. Notable people with the surname include:

- David Damschroder (born 1954), American writer and musicologist
- Gene Damschroder (1922–2008), American politician
- Rex Damschroder (born 1950), American politician

== See also ==
- Damschroder Rock, a rock formation of Queen Elizabeth Land, Antarctica
