= Jackson Township, Sandusky County, Ohio =

Township in Ohio, US

- Township
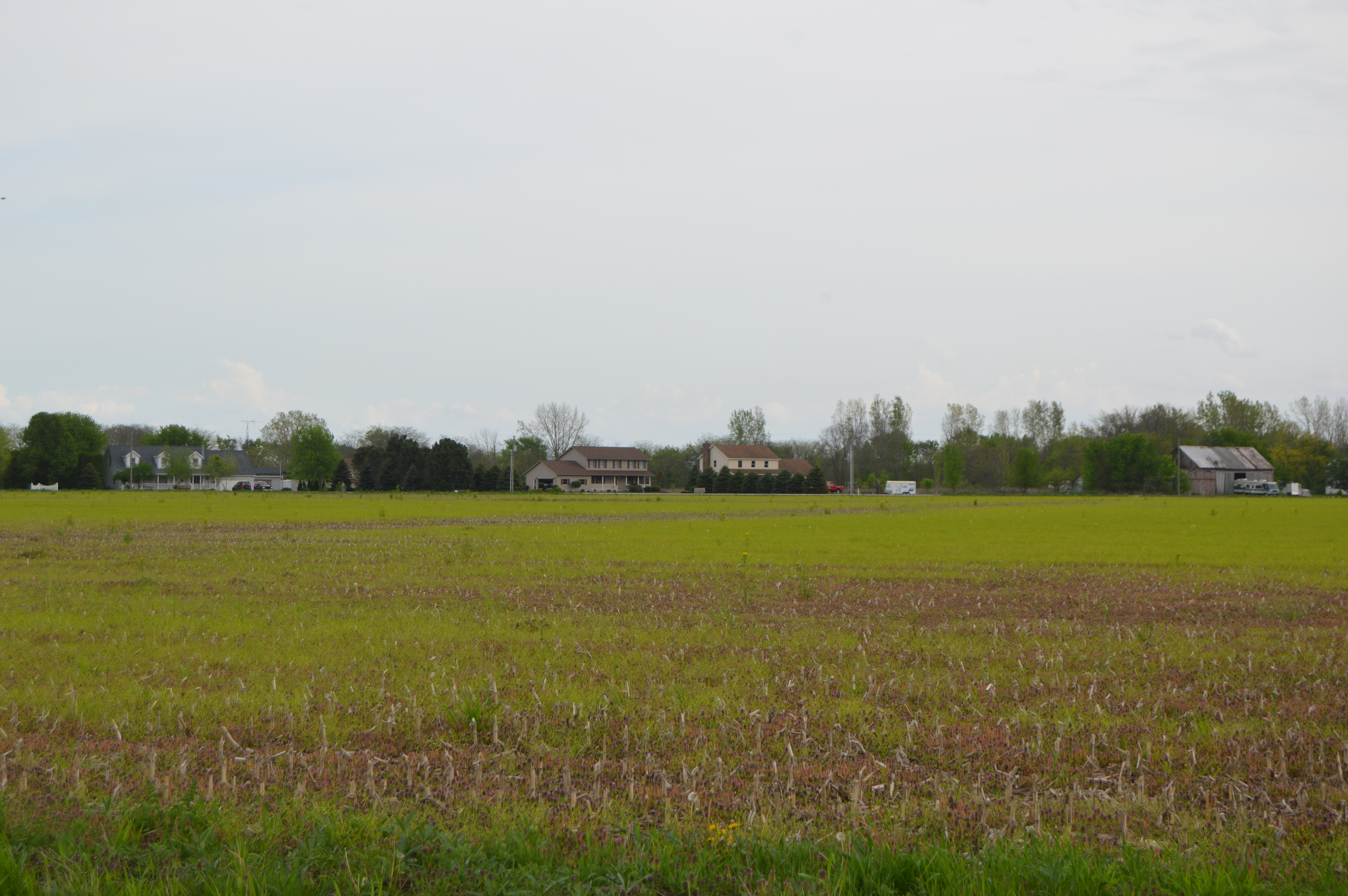
- Fields east of Burgoon

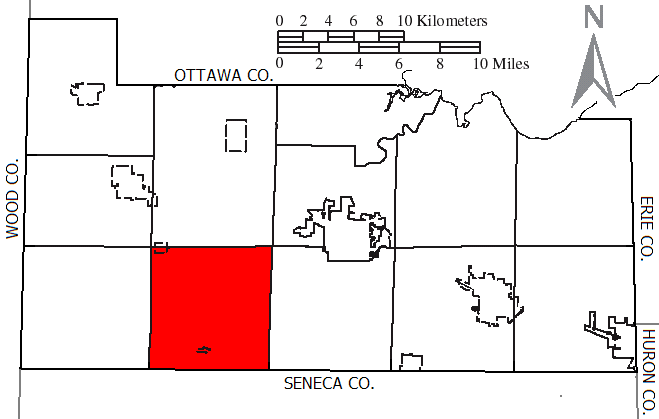
- Location of Jackson Township, Sandusky County, Ohio.
- Coordinates: 41°18′6″N 83°14′50″W
- Country: United States
- State: Ohio
- County: Sandusky

Area
  - Total: 36.0 sq mi (93.3 km^{2})
  - Land: 36.0 sq mi (93.3 km^{2})
  - Water: 0 sq mi (0.0 km^{2})
- Elevation: 669 ft (204 m)

Population (2020)
  - Total: 1,610
  - Density: 44.7/sq mi (17.3/km^{2})
- Time zone: UTC-5 (Eastern (EST))
  - Summer (DST): UTC-4 (EDT)
- FIPS code: 39-38052
- GNIS feature ID: 1086912
- Website: http://www.jackson-sandusky.com

Jackson Township is one of the twelve townships of Sandusky County, Ohio, United States. As of the 2020 census, 1,610 people lived in the township.

== Geography ==
Located in the southwestern part of the county, it borders the following townships:

- Washington Township - north
- Sandusky Township - northeast corner
- Ballville Township - east
- Pleasant Township, Seneca County - southeast corner
- Liberty Township, Seneca County - south
- Jackson Township, Seneca County - southwest corner
- Scott Township - west
- Madison Township - northwest corner

Several communities are located in Jackson Township:

- The village of Burgoon, in the south
- Part of the village of Helena, in the northwest
- The unincorporated community of Millersville, in the northwest
- The unincorporated community of Havens

== Name and history ==
Jackson Township was organized in 1829. It was named for Andrew Jackson, who was President at that time.

It is one of thirty-seven Jackson Townships statewide.

== Government ==
The township is governed by a three-member board of trustees, who are elected in November of odd-numbered years to a four-year term beginning on the following January 1. Two are elected in the year after the presidential election and one is elected in the year before it. There is also an elected township fiscal officer, who serves a four-year term beginning on April 1 of the year after the election, which is held in November of the year before the presidential election. Vacancies in the fiscal officership or on the board of trustees are filled by the remaining trustees.
