= Erlin =

Erlin may refer to:

== Places ==
- Erlin, Changhua, a township in Taiwan
- Erlin, Ohio, an unincorporated community in the United States

== People ==
- Robbie Erlin (born 1990), American baseball pitcher
- Erlin Geffrard (born 1987), artist and musician
