= Ohio State Route 300 =

State highway in Sandusky County, Ohio, US

State Route 300

Route information
- Maintained by ODOT
- Length: 6.33 mi (10.19 km)
- Existed: 1932–present

Major junctions
- South end: US 6 near Helena
- North end: US 20 near Woodville

Location
- Country: United States
- State: Ohio
- Counties: Sandusky

Highway system
- Ohio State Highway System; Interstate; US; State; Scenic
← SR 299	→ SR 301

State Route 300 (SR 300, OH 300) is a 6.33-mile (10.19 km) long north–south state highway in northwestern Ohio, a U.S. state. The southern terminus of SR 300 is at a T-intersection with U.S. Route 6 (US 6) approximately 1.50 miles (2.41 km) west of the village of Helena. Its northern terminus is at US 20 just over 2.50 miles (4.02 km) southeast of Woodville.

SR 300 is a two-lane highway that provides access to the village of Gibsonburg from both US 6 and US 20. When first designated in the early 1930s, SR 300 only connected US 20 to Gibsonburg. Later in that decade, it would be extended south to link the village with US 6.

== Route description ==
SR 300 lies entirely within the western portion of Sandusky County. Commencing at a T-intersection with US 6 on the boundary between Scott Township and Madison Township west of Helena, SR 300 heads due north through a landscape that is primarily farmland. Some patches of trees and a few homes also appear along this stretch of the highway. North of where it intersects County Road 55 (CR 55), the state highway is bounded on the east side by woods for a distance, up to its intersection with CR 65. Continuing north, SR 300 enters into Gibsonburg as it passes by Gibsonburg High School along Main Street, which the highway follows through the village. SR 300 passes through a primarily residential portion of Gibsonburg as it crosses the CSX railway line, with side streets meeting the highway along the way. The state highway enters the central business district upon crossing Yeasting Street. One block north of there, SR 300 meets SR 600 at Gibsonburg's only signalized intersection. One block north of there, after Stevenson Street, SR 300 re-enters residential territory. The highway passes a few commercial businesses on the outskirts of the village, and upon crossing CR 79, the route re-enters rural Madison Township, bounded by a large pond and trees to the west and some homes to the east. After crossing CR 85, SR 300 enters a vastness of farmland, as it passes into Woodville Township. Upon crossing into the township, the route travels amidst a primarily forested terrain as it passes its intersection with CR 115, and then arrives at its endpoint at the four-lane divided US 20 southeast of Woodville. Continuing north of US 20 after SR 300 ends is CR 56.

Frequently, the Ohio Department of Transportation (ODOT) conducts surveys throughout its highway system to determine the volume of traffic utilizing it. This is done using a metric called the average annual daily traffic (AADT). The AADT identifies the amount of traffic using a given stretch of roadway on any typical day of the year. According to a 2009 survey, ODOT determined that the portion of SR 300 with the highest traffic volume was the stretch between CR 65 south of the Gibsonburg village limits and SR 600 in downtown Gibsonburg, which saw an average of 2,740 passenger vehicles and 90 commercial vehicles on a daily basis. This same report identified the segment of SR 300 between its southern terminus at US 6 and its intersection with CR 65 as having the lightest volume of traffic, with an AADT of 1,340 passenger vehicles and 40 commercial vehicles. No portion of SR 300 is included as a part of the National Highway System (NHS). The NHS is a system of routes deemed to be most important for the economy, mobility and defense of the nation.

== History ==
SR 300 was designated in 1932. Originally, the state highway was a paved spur route connecting US 20 with Gibsonburg. By 1937, SR 300 was extended south from Gibsonburg to its current endpoint at US 6. The entirely of this stretch of roadway was paved upon being brought into the state highway system.

== Major intersections ==
The entire route is in Sandusky County.

Location	mi	km	Destinations	Notes
Madison Township	0.00	0.00	US 6	Southern terminus at T-intersection
Gibsonburg	3.01	4.84	SR 600	Signalized intersection
Woodville Township	6.33	10.19	US 20	Northern terminus
1.000 mi = 1.609 km; 1.000 km = 0.621 mi
