= Millersville =

Millersville may refer to:

- Millersville, Illinois
- A former settlement on Jarvis Island in the Pacific Ocean called Millersville, Jarvis Island
- Millersville, Maryland
- Millersville, Michigan
- Millersville, Missouri
- Millersville, Ohio
- Millersville, Pennsylvania
- Millersville, Tennessee
- Millersville University of Pennsylvania, a public university
