= Fremont Airport =

- IATA: none; ICAO: none; FAA LID: 14G

Summary
- Airport type: Public
- Owner: Fremont Airport LLC
- Operator: Rex Damschroder
- Serves: Sandusky County
- Location: Fremont, Ohio
- Elevation AMSL: 663 ft (202 m)
- Coordinates: 41°19′59″N 083°09′40″W

Map
- Location within Ohio Location within the United States

Runways
Direction	Length		Surface
Direction	ft	m	Surface
09/27	4,137	1,261	Asphalt
18/36	2,238	682	Turf

Statistics (2013)
- Aircraft operations: 38,450
- Based aircraft: 67
- Source: Federal Aviation Administration

Fremont Airport (FAA LID: 14G) is a public-use airport located two nautical miles (4 km) southwest of the central business district of Fremont, a city in Sandusky County, Ohio, United States. It is privately owned by Fremont Airport LLC.

== History ==
Progress Field began when Gene Damschroder, a World War II naval aviator, was convinced by the president of Whirlpool to move his existing airport between Clyde and Green Springs to a new location southwest of Fremont. (Note: Another local airport, Slager Field, was eventually forced to relocate to the east of Fremont after a bypass highway bisected one of its runways.) (Note: The original site, which had been established by 1959, was called both Tri-City Airport and Wonder Airport.)

Construction on the airport had begun by mid October 1961. A contest was held to name the airport and in July 1962 and Progress Field was selected as the winner. However, before the airport opened, the decision was made to increase the runway length to 3,500 feet (1,100 m). The airport was officially opened on 28 July 1963, when Jacquelyn Mayer, the winner of that year's Miss America pageant, cut the ribbon.

By early July 1967, the airport had hangar space for fifty airplanes and six companies had airplanes based there. (Note: Damschroder also owned the Steel Panel Building Company, which was located at the airport and produced arched steel panels that bolted together to form corrugated, Quonset hut-like structures.) By early April 1971, work had started on a project to lengthen the runway to 4,100-foot (1,200 m) and a new hangar. Plans were also being made to build a parallel taxiway and widen the runway.

The airport began selling jet fuel in June 1977, as one jet was based there at the time. In 1979, Damschroder convinced workers demolishing the old city hall to transport debris to the airport to be used as fill in violation of a health department order. By late September 1980, construction on an anticipated extension of the runway to 4,500 feet (1,400 m) had begun. However the extension, which was completed by late September 1990, only reached 4,300-foot (1,300 m).

Damschroder offered to give the airport to the county in October 1986, but it was rejected as his proposed 6,900 feet (2,100 m) northeast–southwest runway was deemed unrealistic. An additional 35 acres (14 ha) would have to be purchased and there was limited room for adjacent industrial development. The proposal was again dismissed as a possible site for the Sandusky County Regional Airport in 1988 due to insufficient space for a 5,500-foot (1,700 m) runway. It was claimed that Damschroder, in his candidacy for county commissioner, misrepresented the situation at the airport in a letter to the newspaper the News-Messenger in April 1990. In opposition to the construction of a new airport, Damschroeder again proposed building a new 6,500 feet (2,000 m) diagonal runway in January 1994. Two months later, the Woodbridge Corporation, a local company, announced that its business jets would stop landing at the airport due to concerns the existing runway was too short to be safe. Damschroeder bought 131 acres (53 ha) acres to the north of the airport in April 1996. He claimed this was to build a larger apron to park business jets, but also suggested the land could be used to extend the north–south runway to a length greater than that at the Sandusky County Regional Airport then under construction. Further improvements in 1999, including adding heating and an automatic door to a 12,000-square-foot (1,100 m^{2}) hangar, were motivated by the development of the new airport. Work to enlarge the runway to approximately 4,400 feet (1,300 m) long and 60 feet (18 m) wide was nearly complete by early June 2002.

The airport began holding an annual private pilot ground school in 2008. After Damschroder was killed in an airplane crash the same year, his son Rex took over management of the airport. Efforts to restore a C-53D that had been flown to the airport in 1988 had begun by late May 2011. (Note: A second DC-3 stored at the airport was flown out in 2014.) Although it was unable to be completed in time for a D-Day 75th anniversary flight to France, work continued in 2019.

In 2023, a Radiological Field Monitoring Emergency Phase exercise was carried out at the airport to help authorities prepare for radiological emergencies. In early 2024, thieves broke into the airport and stole tools out of multiple hangars. Hangar repairs were required.

== Facilities and aircraft ==
Fremont Airport covers an area of 60 acres (24 ha) at an elevation of 663 feet (202 m) above mean sea level. It has two runways: 9/27 is 4,137 by 60 feet (1,261 x 18 m) with an asphalt pavement; 18/36 is 2,238 by 130 feet (682 x 40 m) with a turf surface.

The airport has a fixed-base operator that sells avgas. Services include general maintenance, ground power, hangars, and courtesy transportation. Amenities include internet, vending machines, pilot supplies, a crew lounge, and snooze rooms.

For the 12-month period ending August 16, 2013, the airport had 38,450 aircraft operations, an average of 105 per day: 96% general aviation, 4% air taxi and <1% military. At that time there were 67 aircraft based at this airport: 82% single-engine and 12% multi-engine airplanes as well as 6% ultralight.

== Accidents and incidents ==
- On 13 September 1987, a Beechcraft Musketeer crashed shortly after taking off from the airport, injuring the pilot and six passengers.
- On February 24, 2008, a Shaffer KR-2 experienced an engine failure just after takeoff from the Fremont Airport. The pilot reported a wheels-up landing and reported no mechanical malfunctions that could have precluded normal operation, though the weather conditions at the time were found to be ripe for carburetor icing.
- On 8 June 2008, a Cessna 206 Stationair crashed while maneuvering to land at the Fremont Airport. After a 30 minute flight carrying passengers in support of a local flying club, witnesses reported that the aircraft was flying at low altitude towards the runway before banking, descending, and impacting the ground. One witness said the aircraft appeared to be on the edge of an aerodynamic stall, while another heard the engine rev up just before the descent. The probable cause of the accident was found to be the pilot’s failure to maintain airplane control for an undetermined reason, which resulted in an inadvertent stall; contributing was the pilots macular degeneration, for which he had received treatment over the past two years.
- On May 10, 2017, a Piper PA-23 Aztec crashed while landing at the Fremont Airport. The pilot was using an RNAV instrument approach to help with vertical guidance to the runway, but as he crossed an adjacent highway, he hit a semitruck passing through the flight path. The aircraft continued for landing, but as it touched down, its main landing gear collapsed. The aircraft subsequent veered off the left side of the runway.

== See also ==
- List of airports in Ohio
