= Mull Covered Bridge =

- U.S. National Register of Historic Places
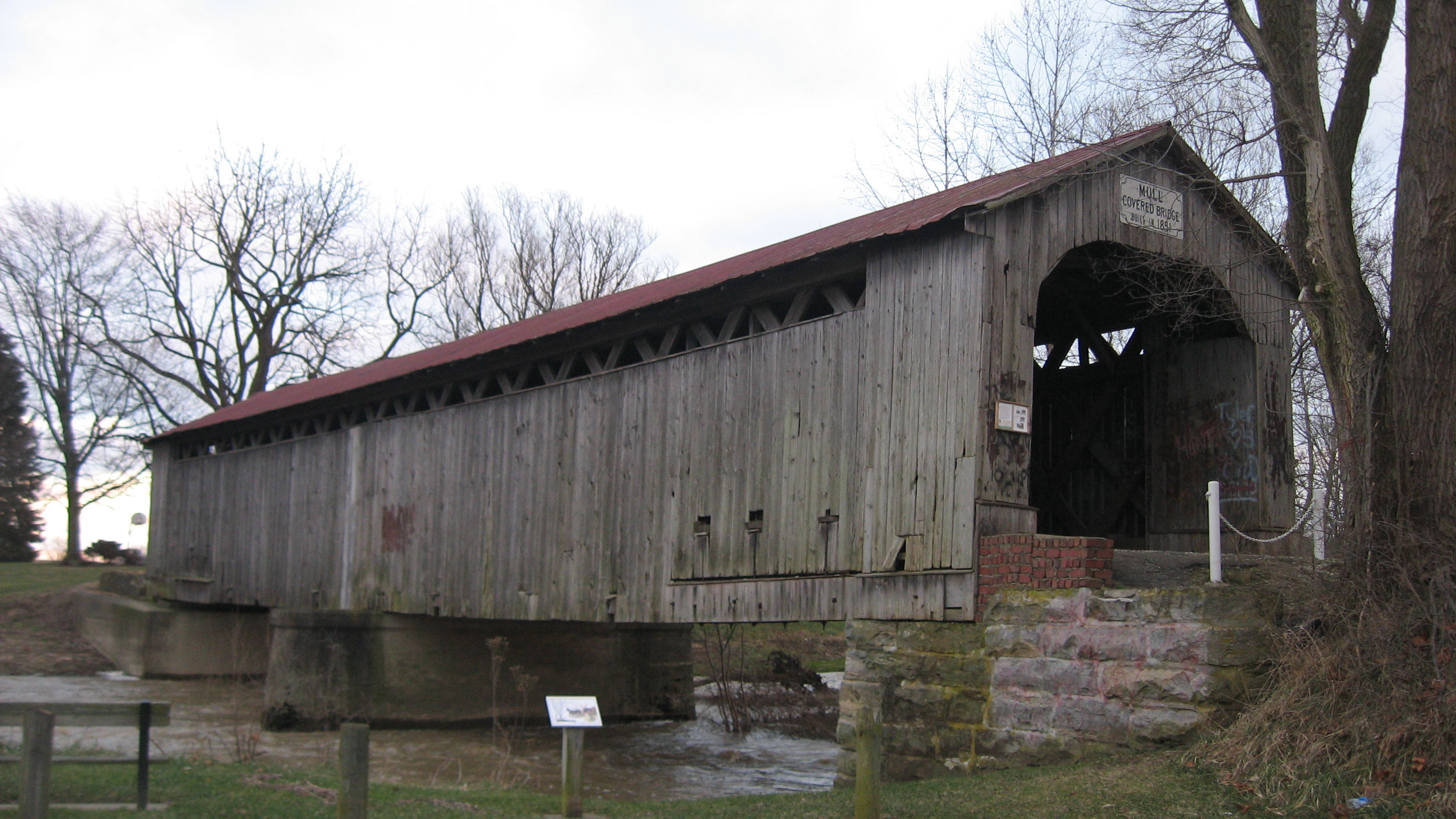
- Western end and northern side of the bridge

- Location within Ohio Location within the United States
- Nearest city: Burgoon, Ohio
- Coordinates: 41°15′39″N 83°11′4″W
- Area: Less than 1 acre (0.40 ha)
- Built: 1851
- Architectural style: Town Lattice truss
- NRHP reference No.: 74001618
- Added to NRHP: October 15, 1974

The Mull Covered Bridge is a historic wooden covered bridge in the northwestern portion of the U.S. state of Ohio. Built in the middle of the nineteenth century, it is located near Burgoon in Sandusky County. Although it is no longer used to facilitate transportation, the bridge has been preserved and is now a historic site.

== Construction ==
In 1851, Amos Mull owned a sawmill along the east branch of Wolf Creek in Ballville Township but had a significant problem: the stream hindered potential customers. After he petitioned the Sandusky County Commissioners for aid, his efforts bore fruit: the commissioners agreed to grant $75 toward the construction of a covered bridge near Mull's streamside house, and he agreed to provide the lumber needed to build the bridge. The design selected was known as the Town Lattice truss; composed of many small diagonal elements, the bridge's framework appears to resemble a lattice because of the criss-crossing pattern in which the diagonal elements are attached. The structure itself is composed of the wood from Mull's sawmill, covered with wooden siding placed vertically to cover the sides; it has a metal roof, and the abutments are stone. Measuring 100 feet (30 m) in length, the bridge was built as a single-span structure; at an unknown later date, a concrete support was added in the middle, converting it into a two-span bridge.

== Historic site ==
After more than a century of service, the Mull Covered Bridge closed on 2 August 1962 after a new concrete arch bridge was built to carry the local road that had formerly used the old bridge. Seeing the potential value of preserving the Mull Bridge, the Sandusky County Historical Society pressured the county commissioners to order its preservation; the request was successful, and the bridge was kept as a historic site. Twelve years later, the bridge was listed on the National Register of Historic Places, because it was an example of historic methods of construction. At that time, it was one of just three covered bridges still standing in Ohio's northwestern quarter, and one of just eleven Town Lattice Trusses statewide. Since then, the bridge has not been forgotten: it was renovated in 1990, re-renovated in 2015, and today it is part of Sandusky County's park system. Now more than a century and a half old, it is one of Ohio's oldest extant covered bridges. No other covered bridges remain in Sandusky County, although six others — including a railroad bridge measuring nearly 1,100 feet (340 m) that spanned the Sandusky River — were built and have been destroyed.
