= Ohio State Route 600 =

State highway in Sandusky County, Ohio, US

State Route 600

Route information
- Maintained by ODOT
- Length: 9.67 mi (15.56 km)
- Existed: 1937–present

Major junctions
- West end: US 23 near Gibsonburg
- East end: US 20 / CR 92 near Gibsonburg

Location
- Country: United States
- State: Ohio
- Counties: Sandusky

Highway system
- Ohio State Highway System; Interstate; US; State; Scenic
← SR 598	→ SR 601

State Route 600 (SR 600) is an east–west state highway in the northwestern portion of the U.S. state of Ohio. The western terminus of State Route 600 is at US 23 about 5 miles (8.0 km) west of Gibsonburg. Its eastern terminus is at US 20 in the unincorporated community of Hessville approximately 4.25 miles (6.84 km) east of Gibsonburg.

== Route description ==
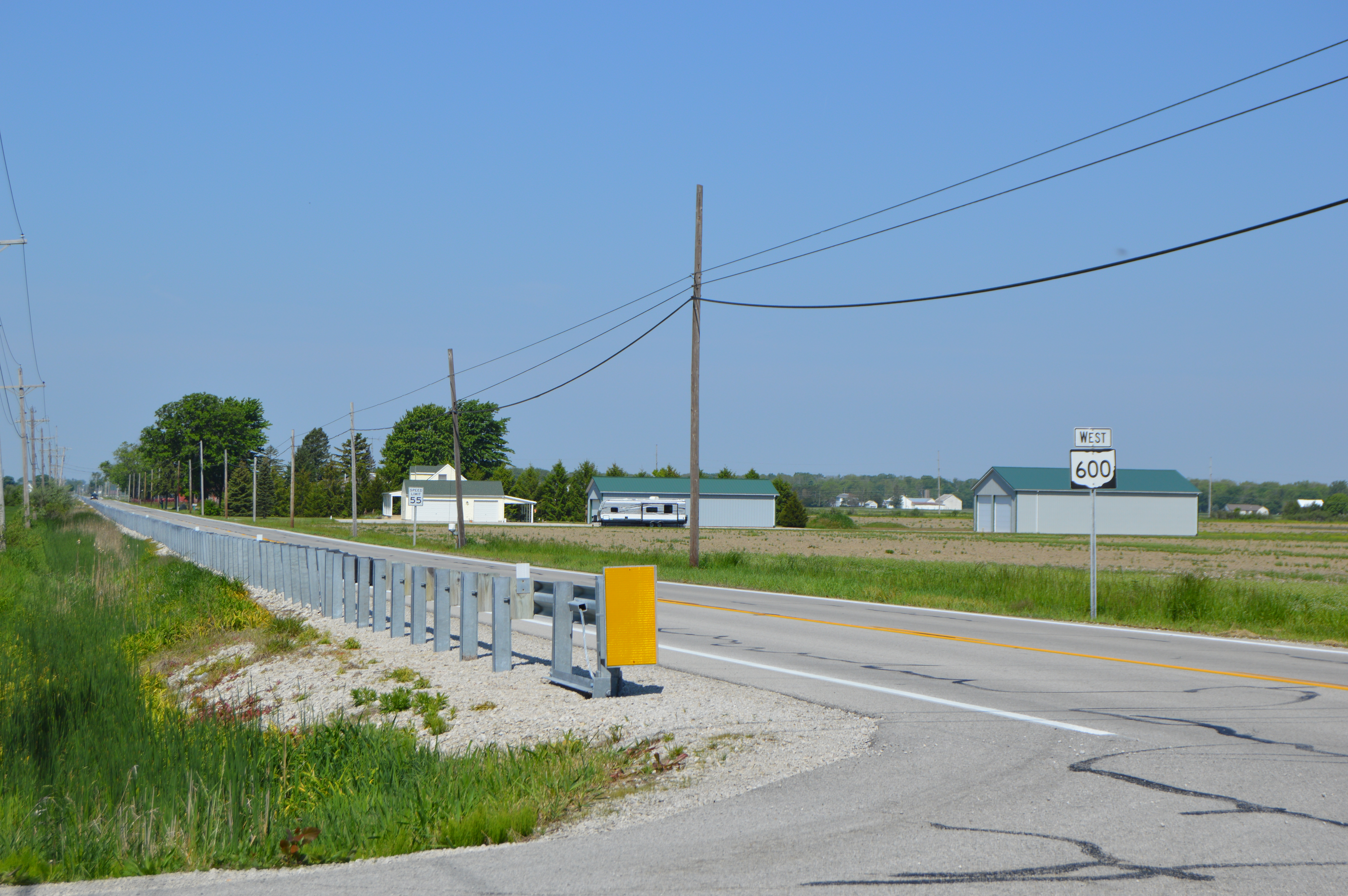
West of Gibsonburg

All of SR 600 exists within the confines of Sandusky County, though at the western terminus, US 23 straddles the Sandusky–Wood County boundary. This highway is not included within the National Highway System, a system of highways deemed most important for the country's economy, defense and mobility.

== History ==
SR 600 was first designated in 1937 along the routing that it maintains today between US 23 and US 20. No significant changes have taken place to the routing of the state highway since its inception.

== Major intersections ==
The entire route is in Sandusky County.

Location	mi	km	Destinations	Notes
Madison Township	0.00	0.00	US 23 (North Fostoria Road) / Gibsonburg Road	
Gibsonburg	5.01	8.06	SR 300 (Main Street)	
Washington Township	9.67	15.56	US 20 / CR 92 (Hessville Road)	
1.000 mi = 1.609 km; 1.000 km = 0.621 mi
