= Jeff Wagner (politician) =

American politician

Jeffrey D. Wagner

Member of the Ohio House of Representatives from the 81st district
- In office January 3, 2003-December 31, 2010
- Preceded by: Rex Damschroder
- Succeeded by: Rex Damschroder

Personal details
- Born: April 2, 1960 (age 66) Sycamore, Ohio
- Party: Republican
- Profession: Farmer

Jeffrey D. Wagner (born April 2, 1960) is a Republican politician who first held office as Seneca County Commissioner from 1996 to 2002. He was then elected to the Ohio House of Representatives 81st District and served from 2003 to 2011. Due to term limitations, he vacated the House seat and was elected to the Seneca County Board of Commissioners as Vice President in 2011. Later that same year, he expressed interest in an Ohio Senate seat vacated by Karen Gillmor, but never pursued appointment. Wagner was one of the three Seneca County Commissioners responsible for the destruction of the historic 1884 Seneca County courthouse in 2012.

== Electoral history ==
Election results
Year	Office	Election	Subject	Party	Votes	%	Opponent	Party	Votes	%
2002	Ohio House of Representatives	General	Jeff Wagner	Republican	19,356	54.07%	James Melle	Democratic	16,443	45.93%
2004	Ohio House of Representatives	General	Jeff Wagner	Republican	32,064	59.32%	William L. Farrell	Democratic	21,992	40.68%
2006	Ohio House of Representatives	General	Jeff Wagner	Republican	25,709	59.58%	Darrell W. Opfer	Democratic	17,443	40.42%
2008	Ohio House of Representatives	General	Jeff Wagner	Republican	35,671	64.5%	Andrew Kashmer	Democratic	19,630	35.5%
2010	Seneca County Commissioner	General	Jeff Wagner	Republican	11,384	63.49%	Dave Thompson	Democratic	6,545	36.51%
