= Dwight Wise =

American politician (1930–2020)

Member of the Ohio House of Representatives from the 85th district
- In office January 3, 1983 – December 31, 1994
- Preceded by: Gene Damschroder
- Succeeded by: Rex Damschroder

Personal details
- Born: September 27, 1930
- Died: December 22, 2020 (aged 90)
- Party: Democratic
- Profession: Farmer

Dwight C. Wise, Jr. (September 27, 1930 – December 22, 2020) was an American politician and farmer from Ohio.

Wise served in the Ohio House of Representatives. He was in office from 1983 until December 1994, being defeated by Rex Damschroder.
