= Bill Reineke =

American politician (born 1954)

President-designate of the Ohio Senate
- Assuming office January 4, 2027
- Succeeding: Rob McColley

President pro tempore of the Ohio Senate
- Incumbent
- Assumed office January 6, 2025
- Preceded by: Kirk Schuring

Member of the Ohio Senate from the 26th district
- Incumbent
- Assumed office January 4, 2021
- Preceded by: David Burke

Member of the Ohio House of Representatives from the 88th district
- In office January 3, 2015 – December 31, 2020
- Preceded by: Rex Damschroder
- Succeeded by: Gary Click

Personal details
- Born: October 9, 1954 (age 72) Toledo, Ohio, U.S.
- Party: Republican
- Children: 2
- Education: Morehead State University (BBA)

William F. Reineke (born October 9, 1954) is an American politician who represents the 26th district of the Ohio State Senate. A member of the Reineke family that has owned the Reineke auto dealerships for decades, he made his first run for public office for state representative in 2014. When incumbent Republican Rex Damschroder failed to qualify for the ballot in 2014, Reineke decided to run to replace him. He won the primary election with 48% of the vote in a three way primary, including a win against Damschroder's wife. Reineke went on to win the general election with 58% of the vote.

== Abortion legislation ==
In 2019, Reineke co-sponsored Ohio Senate Bill 23, commonly referred to as the "Heartbeat Bill." The legislation bans most abortions once a fetal heartbeat can be detected, which is typically around six weeks into pregnancy—before many people are aware they are pregnant. The bill makes no exceptions for rape or incest. It was signed into law by Governor Mike DeWine on April 11, 2019.

Reineke supported the bill as part of broader Republican efforts to limit abortion access in Ohio. SB 23 was met with national attention and sparked legal challenges shortly after its passage.

In September 2022, enforcement of the law was blocked by a Hamilton County judge, temporarily restoring legal abortion access in Ohio up to 22 weeks while court proceedings continued.

== Electoral history ==
Election results
Year	Office	Election	Subject	Party	Votes	%	Opponent	Party	Votes	%	Opponent	Party	Votes	%
2014	Ohio House of Representatives	Primary	Bill Reineke	Republican	2,792	53.11%	Rhonda Damschroder	Republican	1,703	32.39%	Richard Geyer	Republican	762	14.49%
2014	Ohio House of Representatives	General	Bill Reineke	Republican	17,335	59.01%	Bill Young	Democratic	12,040	40.99%				
2016	Ohio House of Representatives	Primary	Bill Reineke	Republican	15,777	100.00%								
2016	Ohio House of Representatives	General	Bill Reineke	Republican	36,470	100.00%								
2018	Ohio House of Representatives	Primary	Bill Reineke	Republican	8,119	100.00%								
2018	Ohio House of Representatives	General	Bill Reineke	Republican	26,016	65.87%	Rachel Crooks	Democratic	13,482	34.13%				
2020	Ohio Senate	Primary	Bill Reineke	Republican	25,363	64.66%	Melissa Ackison	Republican	13,864	35.34%				
2020	Ohio Senate	General	Bill Reineke	Republican	114,776	70.57%	Craig Swartz	Democratic	47,050	28.93%	Robert Taylor	Write-in	824	0.51%
2024	Ohio Senate	Primary	Bill Reineke	Republican	34,425	100.00%								
2024	Ohio Senate	General	Bill Reineke	Republican	124,213	76.15%	Mohamud Jama	Democratic	38,908	23.85%				

== Ohio House of Representatives ==
In his second term, Reineke worked as a member of the House Finance Committee to pass the two-year Ohio operating budget for fiscal years 2018-2019. One provision he supported as a part of HB 49 was to freeze Ohio's Medicaid expansion, preventing new enrollment in the program by low-income Ohioans. In 2017, Reineke was named as the Assistant Majority Whip. His support of small businesses and working families and leadership for his district were cited as reasons for his appointment to the position. With the ascent of Larry Householder as Speaker, Reineke was dropped from leadership.

In 2019, Ohio Governor Mike DeWine proposed a gas tax increase in the state's two-year transportation budget. Representative Reineke opposed HB 62 because of the gas tax increase. The tax increase passed despite the opposition from Reineke and other conservatives in the House and Senate.

== 2020 Ohio Senate Campaign ==
On April 9, 2019, Reineke announced he was running for the Ohio Senate seat that will be vacated by David Burke in late 2020.

Reineke's campaign has been endorsed by Congressman Jim Jordan, incumbent Senator Dave Burke, the Ohio Republican Party, and the Buckeye Firearms Association.

Ohio Senate
Preceded by Kirk Schuring	President pro tempore of the Ohio Senate; 2025–present	Incumbent
Preceded by Rob McColley	President of the Ohio Senate; Taking office 2027	Designate
