= Winters Station, Ohio =

Unincorporated community in Ohio, U.S.

Coordinates: 41°16′37″N 83°14′08″W

Winters Station is an unincorporated community in Sandusky County, in the U.S. state of Ohio.

== History ==
A post office called Winters Station was established in 1861, and remained in operation until 1873. The community was named for Jacob Winter, proprietor.
