= York, Sandusky County, Ohio =

Unincorporated community in Ohio, U.S.

Coordinates: 41°21′33″N 82°53′32″W

York is an unincorporated community in Sandusky County, in the U.S. state of Ohio.

== History ==
Former variant names of York were York Station and Townsend. The railroad was extended to York Station in 1853. A post office called Townsend was established in 1828, and remained in operation until 1905.
