= Sandusky County Regional Airport =

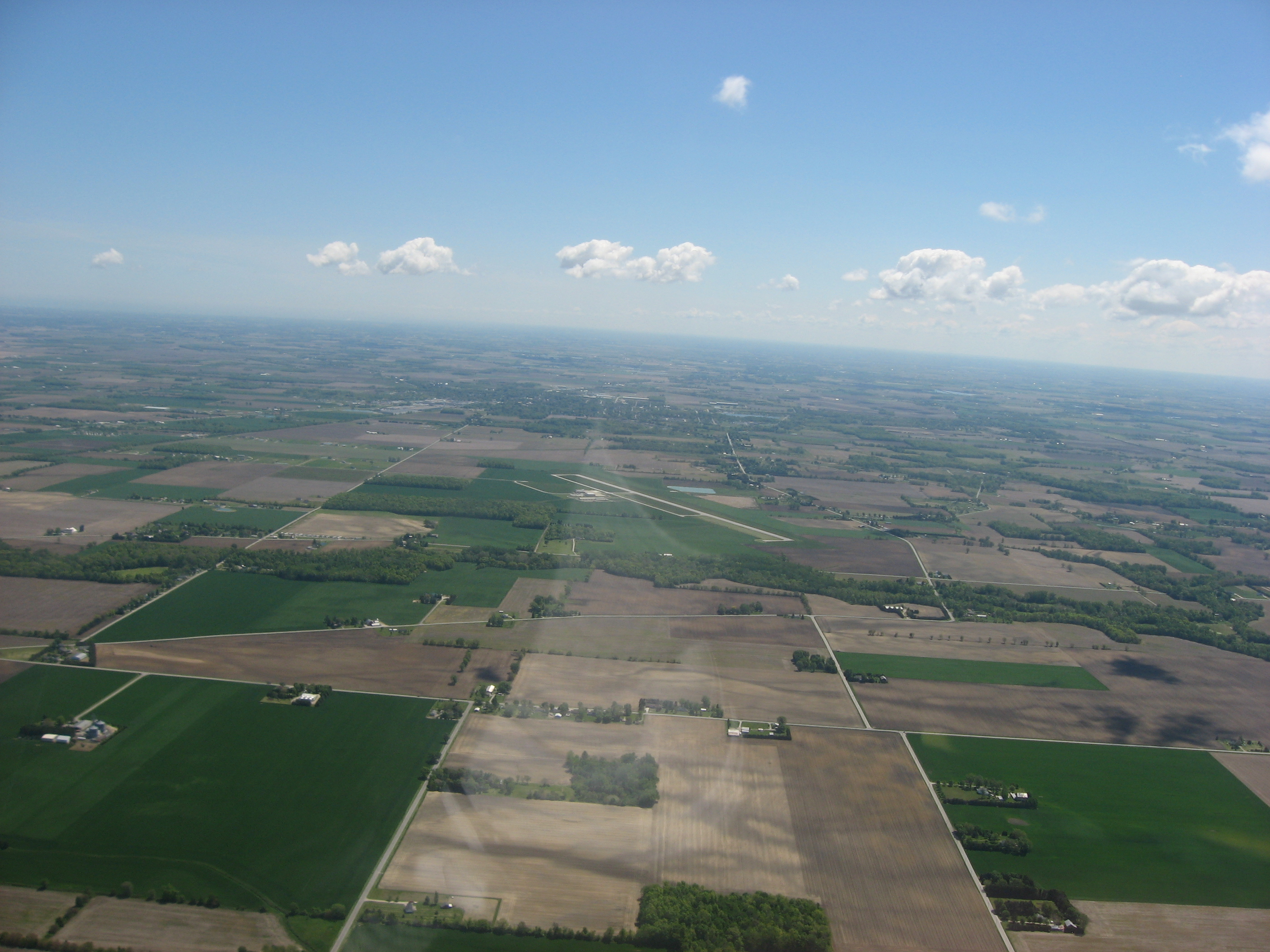
- Aerial view of Sandusky County Regional Airport and the surrounding countryside.
- IATA: none; ICAO: none; FAA LID: S24

Summary
- Airport type: Public
- Owner: Sandusky County
- Operator: David Wadsworth
- Serves: Sandusky County
- Location: Clyde, Ohio
- Time zone: UTC−05:00 (-5)
  - Summer (DST): UTC−04:00 (-4)
- Elevation AMSL: 665 ft (203 m)
- Coordinates: 41°17′45″N 083°02′14″W
- Website: www.flys24.com

Map
- Location of airport in Ohio S24 (the United States)

Runways
Direction	Length		Surface
Direction	ft	m	Surface
6/24	5,500	1,676	Asphalt

Statistics (2021)
- Aircraft operations (year ending 9/16/2021): 5,616
- Based aircraft: 16
- Source: Federal Aviation Administration

Sandusky County Regional Airport (FAA LID: S24) is a county-owned public-use airport located five nautical miles (9 km) southeast of the central business district of Fremont, a city in Sandusky County, Ohio, United States.

== History ==
Efforts to build a new airport began in August 1986 after the City of Clyde proposed building one at a location northwest of the city. As a result, the county considered funding a study to evaluate potential locations in January 1987. By early March 1988, the number of sites under consideration had been narrowed down to five. Then, in early December, consultants recommended an area in Green Creek Township adjacent to Ohio State Route 19. However, both the idea of a new airport and the site itself faced significant opposition from local residents.

By late July 1993, the county had begun a process to acquire 500 acres (200 ha) land from at least 14 different property owners to build the airport. By 1996, attitudes had changed somewhat, with 92 percent of respondents to a survey stating they would use the new airport. However, many also were of the opinion that the existing Fremont Airport should remain in operation.

After pushing back the date once, the airport opened on 10 July 1999. However, only the runway had been finished at that time. By mid December, airport administration had moved into a new terminal building was complete and a 10,000 ft^{2} (930 m^{2}) maintenance hangar was almost complete. The official grand opening finally occurred on 10 June 2000.

Work to extend the parallel taxiway by 1,700 ft (520 m) had begun by mid May 2010.

The airport sits on land owned by the county. However, the airport was privately managed, and all its facilities privately owned, until Sandusky County bought the airport in 2012 in an effort to keep it from closing.

In May 2022, the airport received $1.6 million from the U.S. Department of Transportation to reconstruct Apron A. Additional funding was provided by the Ohio Department of Transportation.

== Facilities and aircraft ==
Sandusky County Regional Airport covers 589 acres (238 ha) and has one runway designated 6/24 with a 5,500 by 100 ft (1,676 x 30 m) asphalt pavement. For the 12-month period ending September 16, 2021, the airport had 5,616 aircraft operations, an average of 15 per day: 81% general aviation, 20% air taxi and <1% military. At that time there were 16 aircraft based at this airport: 13 single-engine airplanes, 1 multi-engine airplane, and 2 helicopters.

The airport received a $1.6 million federal grant in 2023 to upgrade its parking apron in order to extend its useful life.

The airport has a fixed-base operator that sells avgas and jet fuel as well as offering amenities such as general maintenance, catering, courtesy transportation, a conference room, a crew lounge, and showers.

== Accidents and incidents ==
- On February 9, 2002, a Piper PA-20 Pacer crashed while landing at the Sandusky County Regional Airport. The pilot was flying in the traffic pattern in a light crosswind. During one landing, the airplane began pulling right after touchdown, and the pilot could not maintain directional control despite applying full left rudder and brake. The airplane's right landing gear eventually contact mud off the side of the runway, causing a righthand pivot and lefthand tilt. A tear on the righthand tire was found after the landing, but the cause of the damage could not be identified; the pilot identified his preflight as normal.
- On May 6, 2023, a Piper PA-28 Cherokee crashed after departing Sandusky Regional Airport. The plane had trouble after takeoff and was attempting to return to the airport. However, the pilot was forced to land in a field before making it back to the runway.

== See also ==
- List of airports in Ohio
