= Green Creek, Ohio =

Unincorporated community in Ohio, U.S.

Coordinates: 41°19′43″N 83°03′00″W

Green Creek is an unincorporated community in Sandusky County, in the U.S. state of Ohio.

== History ==
A post office called Green Creek was established in 1825, and remained in operation until 1852. The community took its name from nearby Green Creek.
