= Millersville, Ohio =

Unincorporated community in Ohio, U.S.

Coordinates: 41°18′43″N 83°16′53″W

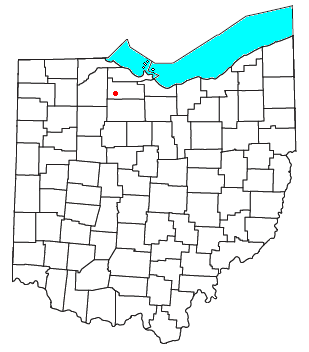
Location of Millersville, Ohio

Millersville is an unincorporated community in northwestern Jackson Township, Sandusky County, Ohio, United States, within the Toledo Metropolitan Area. It lies at the intersection of Millersville Road and the Greensburg Pike. Muddy Creek, which flows into Sandusky Bay near the mouth of the Sandusky River, flows past the community. The community is served by the Helena (43435) post office.

== History ==
Millersburg had its start when the Pittsburgh, Fort Wayne & Chicago Railroad was extended to that point. A post office called Millersville has been in operation since 1873. Peter Miller, the first postmaster, gave the community its name.
