= Wightmans Grove, Ohio =

- Census-designated place
- Location within Ohio Location within the United States
- Coordinates: 41°25′28″N 83°02′48″W
- Country: United States
- State: Ohio
- County: Sandusky

Area
  - Total: 0.17 sq mi (0.45 km^{2})
  - Land: 0.14 sq mi (0.37 km^{2})
  - Water: 0.031 sq mi (0.08 km^{2})
- Elevation: 577 ft (176 m)

Population (2020)
  - Total: 55
  - Density: 389/sq mi (150.1/km^{2})
- Time zone: UTC-5 (Eastern (EST))
  - Summer (DST): UTC-4 (EDT)
- Area codes: 419 & 567
- GNIS feature ID: 2584371

Wightmans Grove is a census-designated place in Sandusky County, in the U.S. state of Ohio. Its population was 55 as of the 2020 census.

== History ==
Wightmans Grove had its start as a summer resort owned by Thelismer O. Wightman.

== Demographics ==
Historical population
Census	Pop.	Note	%±
2020	55		—
U.S. Decennial Census
