= Rex Damschroder =

American politician

Member of the Ohio House of Representatives from the 88th district
- In office January 3, 2011-December 31, 2014
- Preceded by: Jeff Wagner
- Succeeded by: Bill Reineke
- In office January 3, 1995 – December 31, 2002
- Preceded by: Dwight Wise
- Succeeded by: Jeff Wagner

Personal details
- Born: October 22, 1950 (age 75) Tiffin, Ohio
- Party: Republican
- Education: Bowling Green State University, Tiffin University
- Occupation: Realtor, Small Business Owner

Rex Damschroder (born June 4, 1950) is a former member of the Ohio House of Representatives. He was in office from 1995 to 2002 and again from 2011 to 2014. Damschroder is a Republican.

== Career ==
Damschroder has owned several small business throughout the community, and is a licensed realtor. He has served on Fremont City Council and at Terra Community College on the board of trustees. He is a graduate of Bowling Green State University and Tiffin University.

Damschroder is the son of Gene Damschroder, who held the same House seat from 1973 to 1983.

== Ohio House of Representatives ==
Damschroder was elected to the Ohio House of Representatives in 1994, representing the 89th district, which included parts of Sandusky County and Seneca Counties. He served from 1995 to 2003, when he was required to step down due to term limits.

In 2002, Damschroder unsuccessfully challenged incumbent Congressman Paul Gillmor in the 5th congressional district Republican primary. After that, he remained out of the political realm for eight years.

However, with successor Jeff Wagner termed out in 2010, Damschroder made a comeback. He faced primary opposition from Merrill Keiser and Holly Stacy, but won the nomination with 59.88% of the vote. In the general election, Democrats placed high hopes on Seneca County, Ohio Commissioner Ben Nutter, but Damschroder defeated him with 55.31% of the vote.

Damschroder was sworn in for his fifth term on January 3, 2011. He is serving on the committees of Agriculture and Natural Resources, State Government and Elections, and Transportation, Public Safety and Homeland Security (as vice chair).

In late March 2011, Damschroder suffered from a heart attack and received triple bypass heart surgery two days later.

With Senator Karen Gillmor resigning her seat, Damschroder had been named as a possible successor. However, it was announced later that he would not seek the appointment.

Damschroder ran for reelection in 2012, facing opposition from Democratic nominee Bill Young. Damschroder defeated Young by 55.6% to 44.4%, winning reelection.

On February 13, 2014, Damschroder announced he was withdrawing his re-election bid after the Board of Elections Director announced that his name would not appear on the ballot because he forgot to sign his Declaration of Candidacy form, a legal document, that without the candidate's signature caused his candidacy to be invalid. No other candidate filed for the race, and Damschroder said he was looking at all his options to get back on the ballot, including running as a write-in candidate. His wife, Rhonda, ran as a placeholder candidate in the Republican primary, facing opposition from Bill Reineke, Jr., a local businessman, and Dr. Richard A. Geyer, a university professor and Ballville Township trustee. If Rhonda won the primary election, Justin Smith, Chairman of the Sandusky County Central Committee, and David Koehl, Chairman of the Seneca County Central Committee, along with their two secretaries, would appoint Rex to replace his wife as the Republican candidate in the general election.

Damschroder lost the primary election to Bill Reineke.

== Initiatives and positions ==
Social issues

Damschroder has proposed legislation that would ban reading or writing on any digital device while driving. It passed the House almost unanimously. He has rejected the notion that it takes away from personal freedoms.

With the Ohio Statehouse adding a full-service bar to their existing restaurant, Damschroder came out in opposition of serving alcohol at the Statehouse.

Damschroder is currently working to prevent high voltage power lines from being erected through a nature preserve known as Peninsular Farms in Fremont, Ohio.

== Electoral history ==
Election results
Year	Office	Election	Subject	Party	Votes	%	Opponent	Party	Votes	%	Opponent	Party	Votes	%	
1994	Ohio House of Representatives	General	Rex Damschroder	Republican	N/A	N/A	Dwight Wise	Democratic	N/A	N/A					
1996	Ohio House of Representatives	General	Rex Damschroder	Republican	N/A	N/A	N/A	N/A	N/A	N/A					
1998	Ohio House of Representatives	General	Rex Damschroder	Republican	20,378	58.68%	Roger Wise	Democratic	14,350	41.32%					
2000	Ohio House of Representatives	General	Rex Damschroder	Republican	30,904	68.9%	Del Cook	Democratic	13,937	31.1%					
2010	Ohio House of Representatives	General	Rex Damschroder	Republican	21,008	55.31%	Benjamin Nutter	Democratic	14,899	39.23%	Bill Hrabak	Constitution	2,075	5.46%	
2012	Ohio House of Representatives	General	Rex Damschroder	Republican	27,923	55.61%	Bill Young	Democratic	22,290	44.39%					
2014	Ohio House of Representatives	Primary	Rhonda Damschroder	Republican	1,657	35.86%	Bill Reineke	Republican	2,247	48.62%	Richard Geyer	Republican	717	15.52%	*

* Rhonda Damschroder ran as a placeholder for Rex.

Ohio House of Representatives
Preceded by Dwight Wise	Member of the Ohio House of Representatives from the 89th district 1995–2002	Succeeded by Todd Book
Preceded by Jeff Wagner	Member of the Ohio House of Representatives from the 81st district 2011–2012	Succeeded by Lynn Wachtmann
Preceded by Danny Bubp	Member of the Ohio House of Representatives from the 88th district 2013–2014	Succeeded by Bill Reineke
