= Whitmore, Ohio =

Unincorporated community in Ohio, U.S.

Coordinates: 41°23′27″N 82°53′33″W

Whitmore is an unincorporated community in Sandusky County, in the U.S. state of Ohio.

== History ==
A post office called Whitmore was established in 1881, and remained in operation until 1905. Besides the post office, Whitmore had a railroad station.
