= Tinney, Ohio =

Unincorporated community in Ohio, U.S.

Coordinates: 41°18′46″N 83°18′41″W

Tinney is an unincorporated community in Sandusky County, in the U.S. state of Ohio.

== History ==
Tinney was originally called Greensburg, after John L. Green, a local judge. Judge Green(e) settled here in the 1830s. A post office called Tinney was established in 1889, and remained in operation until 1904.
