= Gibsonburg, Ohio =

- Village
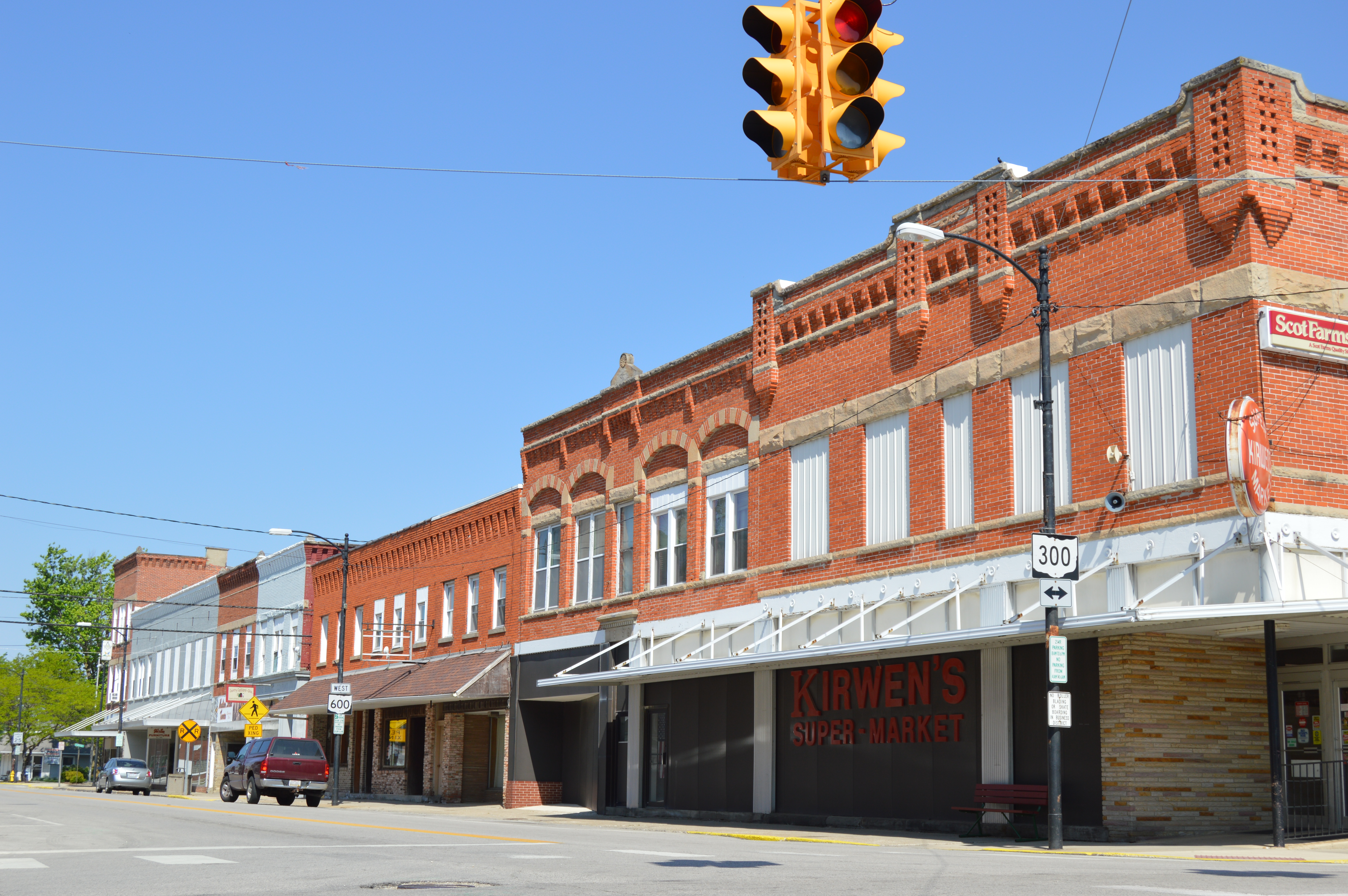
- Madison Street from Main Street, downtown

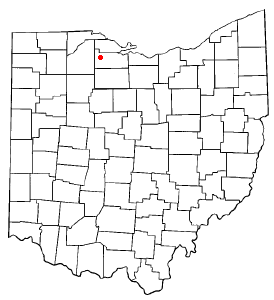
- Location of Gibsonburg, Ohio

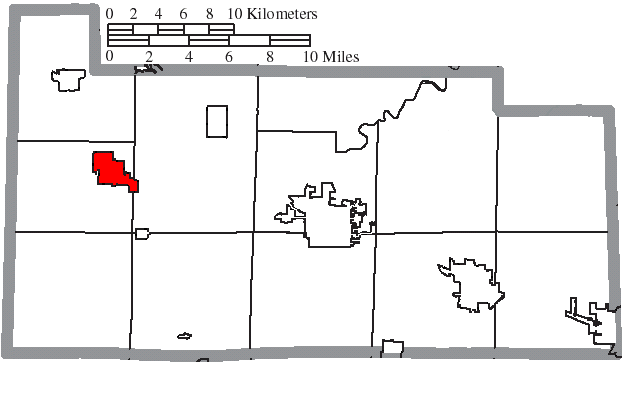
- Location of Gibsonburg in Sandusky County
- Coordinates: 41°22′46″N 83°18′48″W
- Country: United States
- State: Ohio
- County: Sandusky

Government
  - Type: Village council

Area
  - Total: 2.79 sq mi (7.23 km^{2})
  - Land: 2.31 sq mi (5.99 km^{2})
  - Water: 0.48 sq mi (1.24 km^{2})
- Elevation: 682 ft (208 m)

Population (2020)
  - Total: 2,452
  - Estimate (2023): 2,480
  - Density: 1,059.4/sq mi (409.02/km^{2})
- Time zone: UTC-5 (Eastern (EST))
  - Summer (DST): UTC-4 (EDT)
- ZIP code: 43431
- Area code: 419
- FIPS code: 39-30072
- GNIS feature ID: 2398959

Gibsonburg is a village in Sandusky County, Ohio, United States, about 33 miles (53 km) southeast of Toledo. The population was 2,452 at the 2020 census. The National Arbor Day Foundation has designated Gibsonburg as a Tree City USA.

== History ==
Gibsonburg had its start in the year 1871, when General William H. Gibson laid out the town after the railroad had been extended to that point. Gibsonburg was incorporated as a village in 1880.

== Geography ==
According to the United States Census Bureau, the village has a total area of 2.88 square miles (7.46 km^{2}), of which 2.40 square miles (6.22 km^{2}) is land and 0.48 square miles (1.24 km^{2}) is water.

== Demographics ==
Historical population
Census	Pop.	Note	%±
1880	589		—
1890	585		−0.7%
1900	1,791		206.2%
1910	1,864		4.1%
1920	1,737		−6.8%
1930	2,129		22.6%
1940	2,169		1.9%
1950	2,281		5.2%
1960	2,540		11.4%
1970	2,585		1.8%
1980	2,479		−4.1%
1990	2,579		4.0%
2000	2,506		−2.8%
2010	2,581		3.0%
2020	2,452		−5.0%
2023 (est.)	2,480	▲	1.1%
U.S. Decennial Census

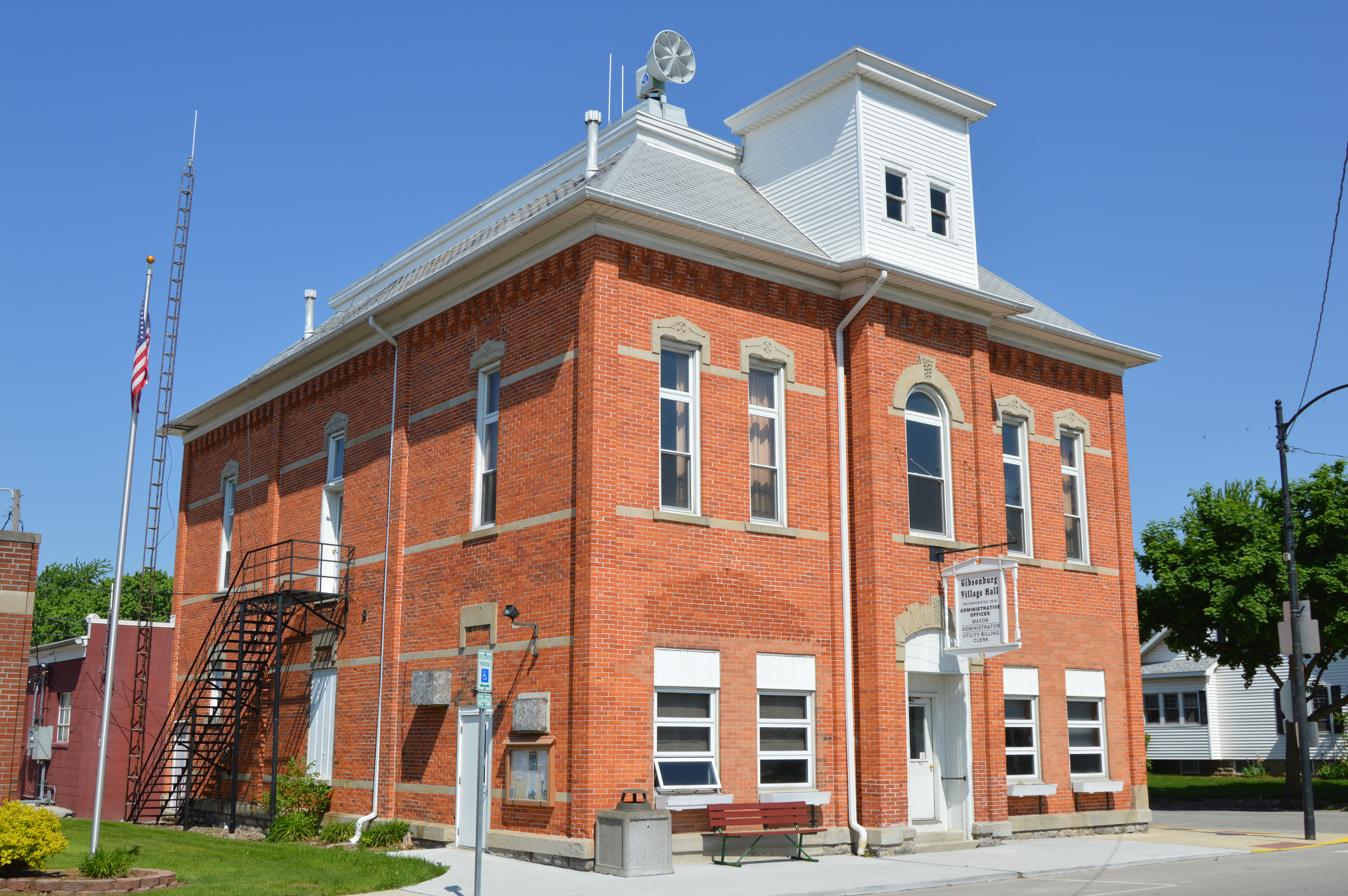
Gibsonburg Village Hall

=== 2010 census ===
As of the census of 2010, there were 2,581 people, 982 households, and 656 families living in the village. The population density was 1,075.4 inhabitants per square mile (415.2/km^{2}). There were 1,065 housing units at an average density of 443.8 per square mile (171.4/km^{2}). The racial makeup of the village was 94.2% White, 0.6% African American, 0.2% Native American, 3.4% from other races, and 1.5% from two or more races. Hispanic or Latino of any race were 8.6% of the population.

There were 982 households, of which 35.9% had children under the age of 18 living with them, 50.5% were married couples living together, 11.6% had a female householder with no husband present, 4.7% had a male householder with no wife present, and 33.2% were non-families. 27.8% of all households were made up of individuals, and 13.9% had someone living alone who was 65 years of age or older. The average household size was 2.55 and the average family size was 3.13.

The median age in the village was 36.9 years. 26.2% of residents were under the age of 18; 8.8% were between the ages of 18 and 24; 27.4% were from 25 to 44; 23.1% were from 45 to 64; and 14.5% were 65 years of age or older. The gender makeup of the village was 48.3% male and 51.7% female.

=== 2000 census ===
As of the census of 2000, there were 2,506 people, 949 households, and 661 families living in the village. The population density was 1,004.7 inhabitants per square mile (387.9/km^{2}). There were 999 housing units at an average density of 400.5 per square mile (154.6/km^{2}). The racial makeup of the village was 93.62% White, 0.32% African American, 0.16% Native American, 0.28% Asian, 4.47% from other races, and 1.16% from two or more races. 8.30% of the population were Hispanic or Latino of any race.

There were 949 households, out of which 35.1% had children under the age of 18 living with them, 55.3% were married couples living together, 9.5% had a female householder with no husband present, and 30.3% were non-families. 27.0% of all households were made up of individuals, and 15.8% had someone living alone who was 65 years of age or older. The average household size was 2.57 and the average family size was 3.13.

In the village, the population was spread out, with 27.5% under the age of 18, 7.5% from 18 to 24, 29.6% from 25 to 44, 18.6% from 45 to 64, and 16.9% who were 65 years of age or older. The median age was 36 years. For every 100 females there were 95.2 males. For every 100 females age 18 and over, there were 89.9 males.

The median income for a household in the village was $40,986, and the median income for a family was $49,044. Males had a median income of $36,121 versus $22,212 for females. The per capita income for the village was $17,482. About 5.3% of families and 6.5% of the population were living below the poverty line, including 8.8% of those under the age of 18 and 5.9% of those 65 and older.

== Education ==
Gibsonburg Exempted Village School District operates one elementary school, one middle school, and Gibsonburg High School.

Gibsonburg has a public library, a branch of the Birchard Public Library Of Sandusky County.
