= Galetown, Ohio =

Unincorporated community in Ohio, U.S.

Coordinates: 41°15′59″N 82°59′48″W

Galetown is an unincorporated community in Sandusky County, in the U.S. state of Ohio.

== History ==
Galetown once had its own schoolhouse.
