= Georg Cronenwett House =

Historic house in Ohio, United States

- U.S. National Register of Historic Places
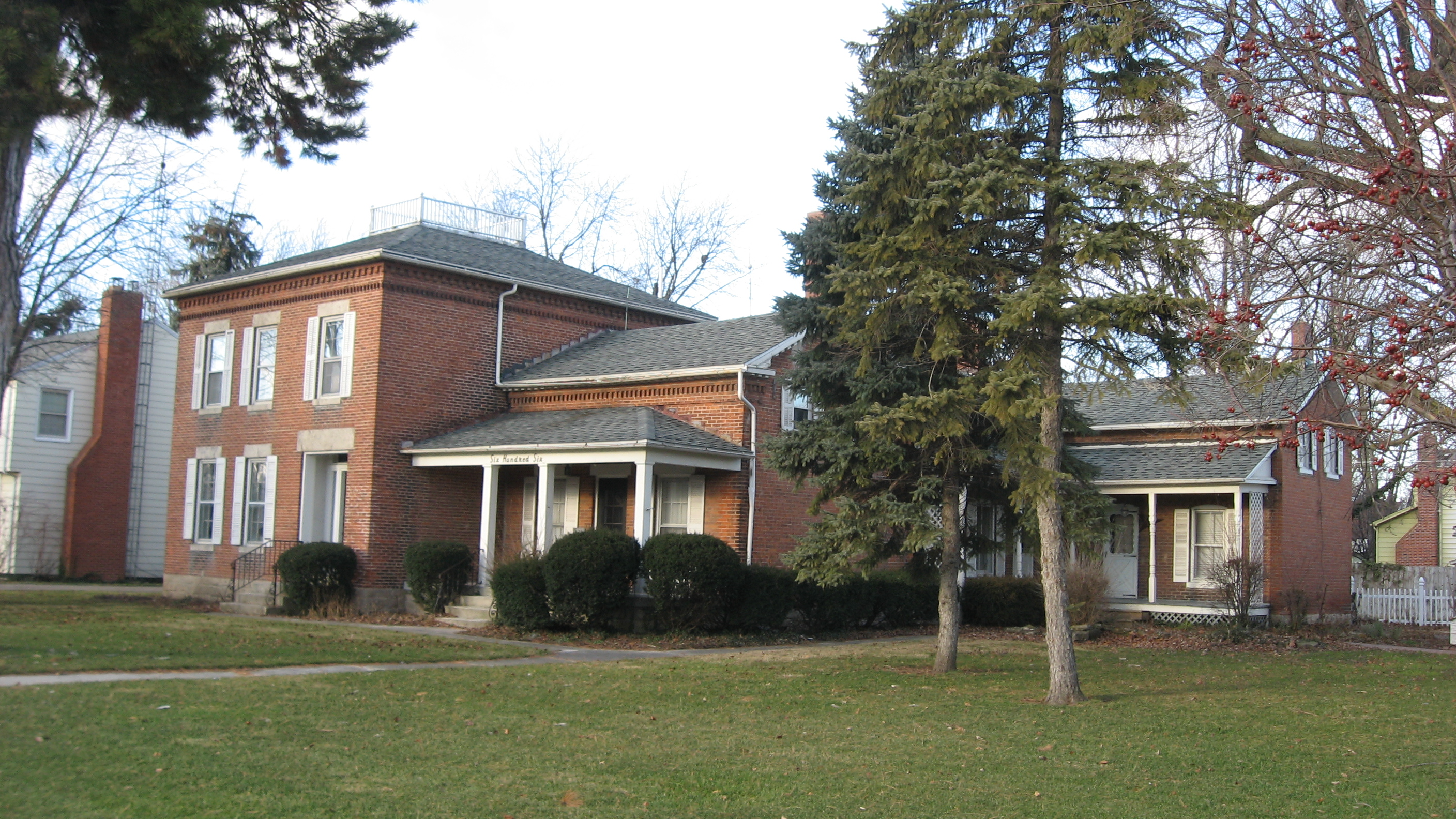
- Front of the house

- Location within Ohio Location within the United States
- Location: 606 W. Main St., Woodville, Ohio
- Coordinates: 41°27′11″N 83°22′7″W
- Area: 1 acre (0.40 ha)
- Built: 1858
- Architectural style: Greek Revival
- NRHP reference No.: 78002184
- Added to NRHP: December 1, 1978

The Georg Cronenwett House is a historic residence in the village of Woodville, Ohio, United States. Located along Main Street on the village's western side, the house has been designated a historic site because of its historic architecture and because of a famous former resident.

Born in the town of Langensteinbach in the Grand Duchy of Baden, Georg Cronenwett settled in the United States in 1832 at the age of eighteen. After nine years of life in Monroe, Michigan, he moved to Woodville at the end of 1841. Throughout this time, Cronenwett was a prominent Lutheran missionary in the Great Black Swamp region of northwestern Ohio and southeastern Michigan. In Woodville, he established his center of operations; among the organizations that he founded in the area were a church school and the Woodville Seminary.

Cronenwett arranged for the construction of the present house in 1858. Built in the Greek Revival style of architecture, it is a brick building with a stone foundation. Some parts are older than others; Cronenwett's original house was only the center of the current structure. This original portion is three bays wide and entered through a recessed main entrance on one side. The house was the first Woodville building to be erected as a parsonage.

In late 1978, the Georg Cronenwett House was listed on the National Register of Historic Places. It qualified for this designation in two different ways: its architecture was deemed of historic significance, and Cronenwett was such an important member of the community's history that the house qualified because of its connection to him. More than seven years later, one other Fremont building joined the Cronenwett House on the National Register: the Christopher C. Layman Law Office, an Italianate building on First Street.
