= Joseph and Rachel Bartlett House =

Historic house in Ohio, United States

- U.S. National Register of Historic Places
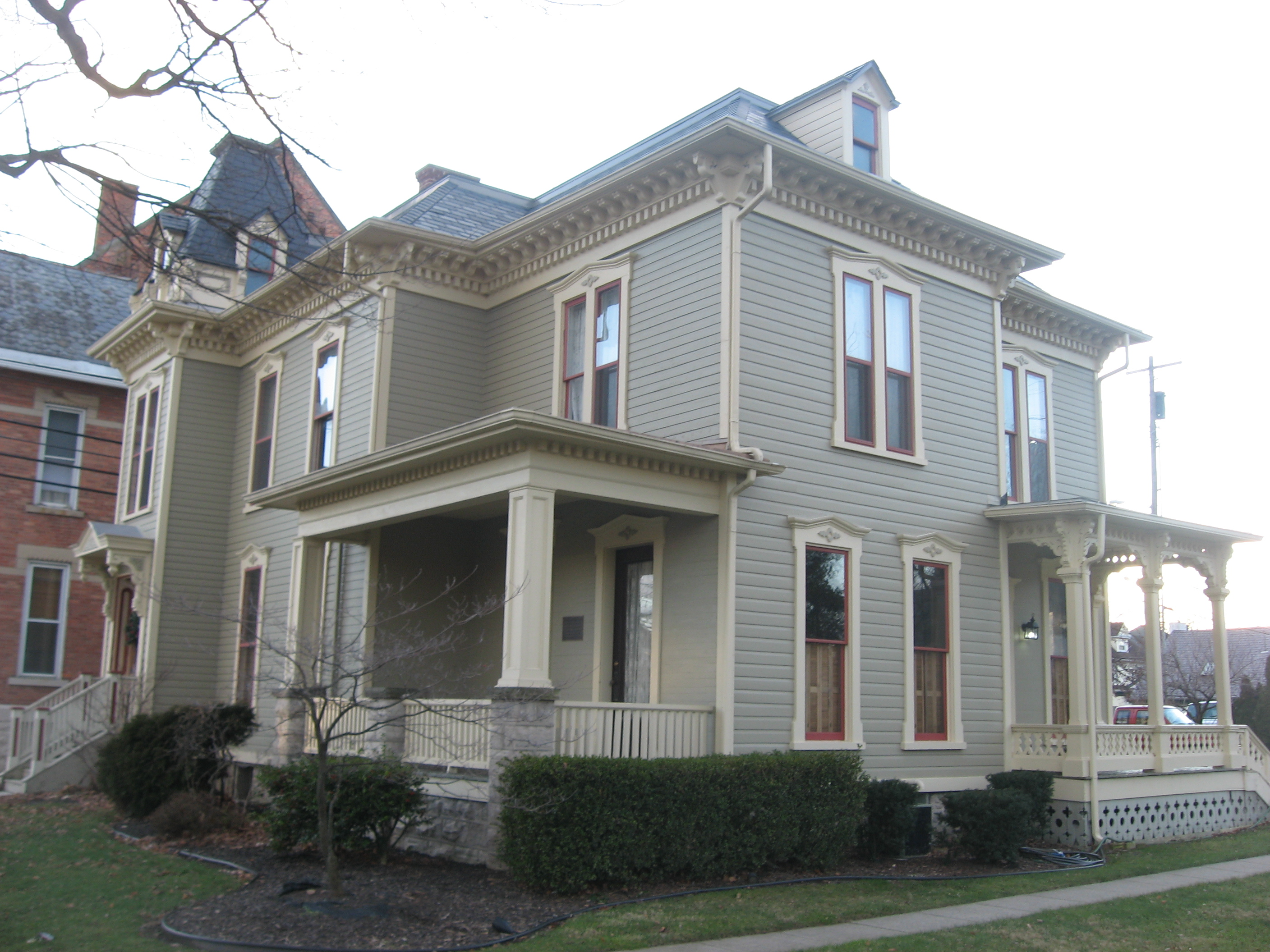
- Front and side of the house

- Location within Ohio Location within the United States
- Location: 212 S. Park Ave., Fremont, Ohio
- Coordinates: 41°20′42″N 83°7′3″W
- Area: Less than 1 acre (0.40 ha)
- Built: 1872
- Architectural style: Second Empire, Italianate
- NRHP reference No.: 90000388
- Added to NRHP: March 21, 1990

The Joseph and Rachel Bartlett House is a historic residence in the city of Fremont, Ohio, United States. Built in 1872, it is one of the city's more prominent examples of high-style architecture.

Born near Tiffin, Ohio in 1830, Joseph R. Bartlett moved to Lower Sandusky (now Fremont) in 1833 with his family. After reading law under his father, young Bartlett entered the legal profession and soon became one of Sandusky County's leading citizens. By the early 1870s, he and his wife Rachel had become sufficiently prosperous to erect a grand house on Park Avenue south of the Sandusky County Courthouse. Choosing limestone for the foundation, weatherboarding for the walls, and an asphalt roof, the Bartletts arranged for the construction of an ornate house that mixed elements of the Italianate and Second Empire styles of architecture. Many distinctive architectural elements characterize their house, including peaked dormers on the mansard roof, a large tower on one corner, ornate carvings on the porch, detailed hood molding, and an elaborate set of carvings and plaster work on the interior. Even the doorways are distinctive: few Fremont houses feature an entrance through a corner tower in the manner of the Bartlett House.

After the Bartletts moved out of the house, it was used by multiple other parties; among the most prominent occupants were Sardis and Margaret Cole and the First United Methodist Church, and it is now used as offices by a local lawyer, Jim Ellis. In 1990, the Bartlett House was listed on the National Register of Historic Places, qualifying because of its historically significant architecture. Among the most important elements of its design is the general style: the majority of houses in the city are contemporary with the Bartlett House, but they are generally smaller vernacular buildings; the architect-designed high style of the Bartlett House presents a strong contrast to the typical Fremont residence. Among the exceptions to this pattern is the Frederick Fabing House; located across the street from the Bartlett House, it features an even more distinctive Second Empire facade.
