= Bartlett–Russell–Hedge House =

Historic house in Massachusetts, United States

- U.S. National Register of Historic Places
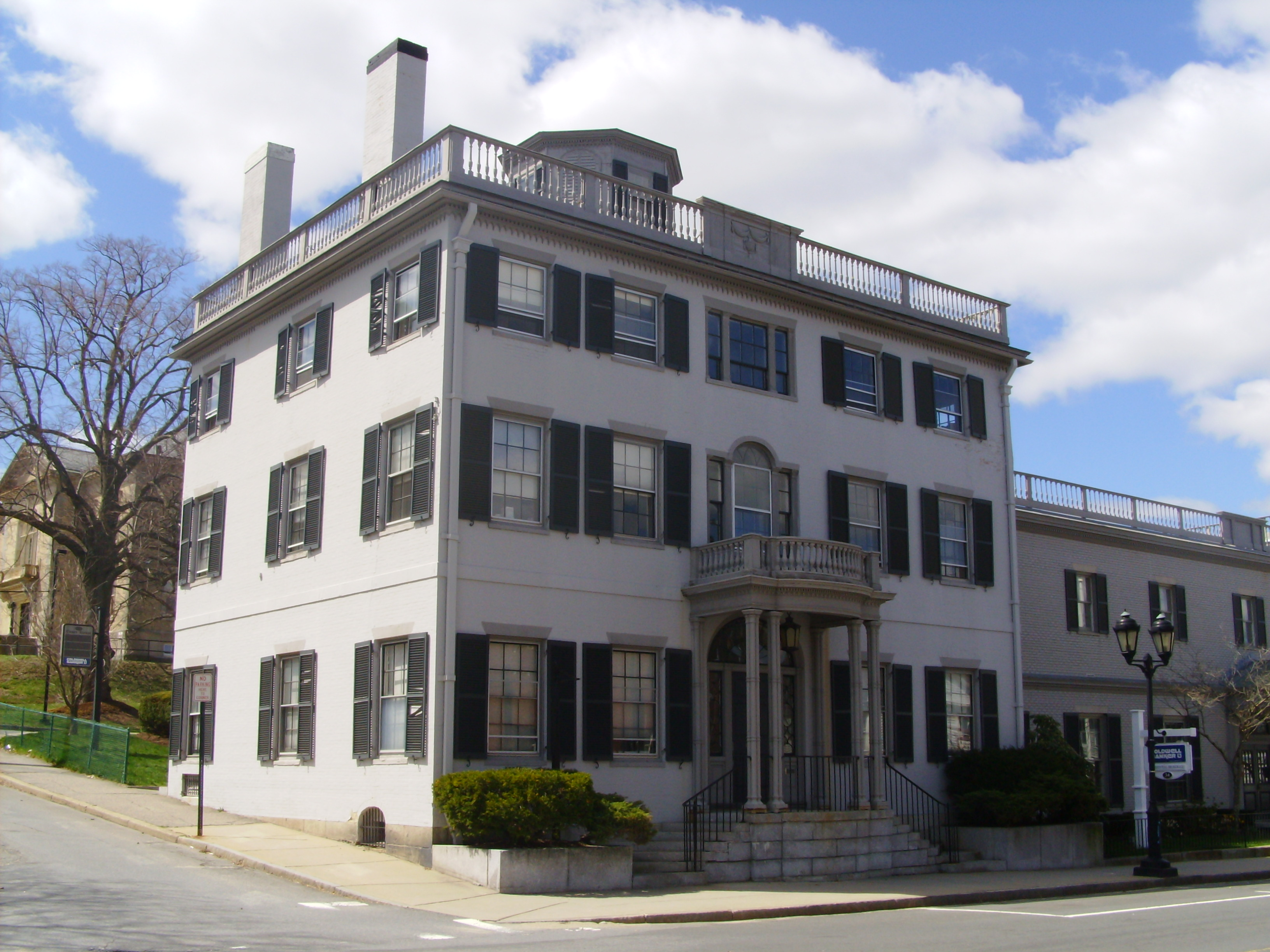

- Location within Massachusetts Location within the United States
- Location: 32 Court St., Plymouth, Massachusetts
- Coordinates: 41°57′27″N 70°40′2″W
- Area: less than one acre
- Built: 1803
- Architectural style: Federal
- NRHP reference No.: 76001614
- Added to NRHP: April 30, 1976

The Bartlett–Russell–Hedge House is a historic house in Plymouth, Massachusetts. Built in 1803, it is a fine local example of Federal architecture. It was listed on the National Register of Historic Places on April 30, 1976. It is presently part of a larger building that houses financial services businesses.

== Description and history ==
The Bartlett–Russell–Hedge House is located in the center of Plymouth, on the south side of Court Street at its junction with Russell Street. It is a three-story painted brick building, with a hip roof surrounded by a low balustrade and topped by a cupola. It is five bays wide and three deep, with a symmetrically arranged front facade. The outer bays have sash windows set in rectangular openings, with smaller windows on the third floor. The main entrance is in the center bay; it is accessed by a short flight of side-facing stone steps, and is sheltered by a roughly rectangular portico supported by paired paneled square columns in front and pilasters in the back. The center portion of the portico has a slightly rounded projection, and is topped by a balustrade. On the second floor above is a Palladian window, while the third-floor window is a three-part window lacking the Palladian rounded arch at the center.

The house was built about 1803 for Joseph Bartlett, a ship's captain. After suffering financial reverses due to the War of 1812, his son William took over the property, converting it to an inn. It was here that his son John was spent his early years; he would later achieve fame as the publisher of Bartlett's Familiar Quotations. The next owner, Nathaniel Russell, owned a local iron manufacturing business. His granddaughter married into the family of Barnabas Hedge, one of his business partners, and eventually inherited the property. In 1951, the Hedge family sold the house to a bank, which made additions to the rear to accommodate its business. The modern attachments to the structure have since been extended further, but the house interior still retains many original features.

== See also ==
- National Register of Historic Places listings in Plymouth County, Massachusetts
