= Havens, Ohio =

Coordinates: 41°18′21″N 83°11′34″W

Havens is an unincorporated community in Jackson Township, Sandusky County, Ohio, United States.

== History ==
A post office called Havens was established in 1898, and remained in operation until 1905. Frank Havens, the first postmaster, gave the community his name.
