= Gene Damschroder =

American politician and aviator

Gene Damschroeder

Member of the Ohio House of Representatives from the 85th district
- In office January 3, 1973 – December 31, 1982
- Preceded by: Paul Pfeifer
- Succeeded by: Dwight Wise

Personal details
- Born: January 14, 1922 Sandusky County, Ohio
- Died: June 8, 2008 (aged 86) Fremont, Ohio
- Party: Republican

Eugene E. "Gene" Damschroder (January 14, 1922 – June 8, 2008) was an American politician and aviator. He was member of the Ohio House of Representatives from 1973 to 1983. He was a member of the Republican Party.

Damschroder flew seaplanes for the U.S. Navy during World War II.

Damschroeder was the owner of the Fremont Airport.

Damschroder was elected to the Ohio House of Representatives in 1972, representing Fremont in the 85th District from 1973 to 1983.

Damschroder tried to regain his seat, now the 81st District, in Republican primary elections in 2002 and 2008.

On June 8, 2008, Damschroder was killed when the single engine Cessna aircraft he was flying crashed with five other persons on board.
