= Call-Bartlett House =

Historic house in Massachusetts, United States

- U.S. National Register of Historic Places
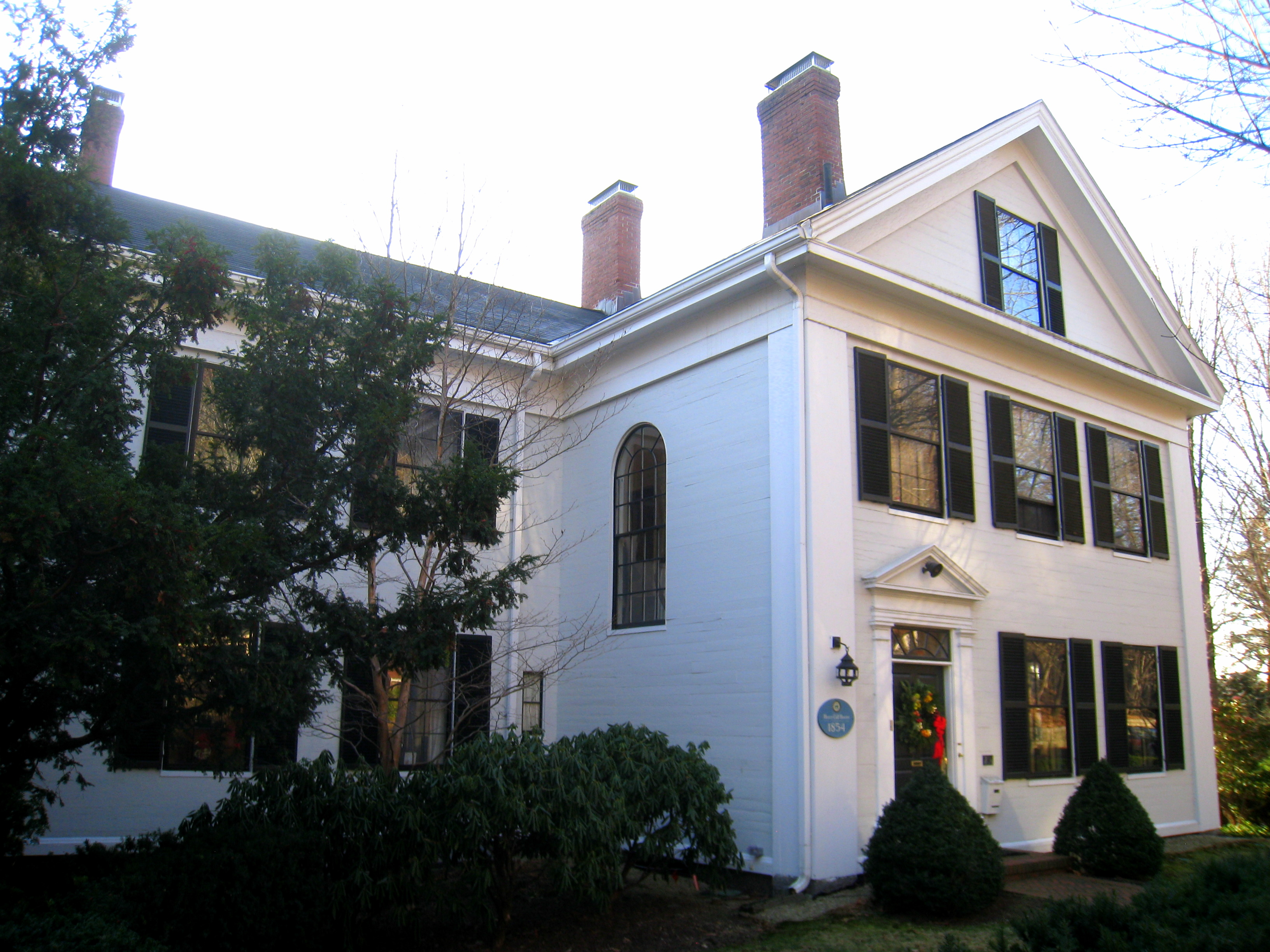

- Location within Massachusetts Location within the United States
- Location: 216 Pleasant St., Arlington, Massachusetts
- Coordinates: 42°24′28″N 71°9′37″W
- Built: 1855
- Architectural style: Greek Revival
- MPS: Arlington MRA
- NRHP reference No.: 85001024
- Added to NRHP: April 18, 1985

The Call-Bartlett House is a historic house in Arlington, Massachusetts. Built in 1855, it is one of the town's finest examples of Greek Revival architecture. The house was listed on the National Register of Historic Places in 1985.

== Description and history ==
The Call-Bartlett House stands on the south side of Pleasant Street (Massachusetts Route 60), roughly midway between Kensington Park and Brunswick Road. The lot on which it stands would historically, and still does, provide a view of Spy Pond, from which it is now separated by intervening construction built after subdivision of the original estate, with the exception of a deeded easement providing pond access. It is a 4-storey L-shaped wood-frame structure, with a cross-gabled roof configuration. The exterior is finished in a combination of flushboarding (mainly on the street-visible sides) and wooden clapboards. The main facade is three bays wide, with the entrance in the left-side bay, and corner pilasters rising to a full entablature and fully pedimented gable. The entrance is framed by pilasters and topped by a four-light transom window, entablature, and gabled pediment. The leg of the L extends to the left from the rear of the main block, and its front is also flushboarded. The side wall between has a single round-arch window. The pond-facing facade has a two-story Greek temple portico with four columns.

This house was built in 1854 for Henry Call, and was for over 40 years the home of George Bartlett. Bartlett was an English draftsman and lithographer, educated at the South Kensington Schools, who played an important role in teaching the arts at the state normal school. The house is one of several more formally decorated Greek Revival homes in the town's local Pleasant Street historic district.

== See also ==
- National Register of Historic Places listings in Arlington, Massachusetts
