= Hessville, Ohio =

- CDP
- Interactive map of Hessville, Ohio
- Coordinates: 41°24′06″N 83°14′50″W
- Country: United States
- State: Ohio
- County: Sandusky
- Township: Washington
- Elevation: 630 ft (190 m)

Population (2020)
  - Total: 174
- Time zone: UTC-5 (Eastern (EST))
  - Summer (DST): UTC-4 (EDT)
- Area codes: 419 and 567
- GNIS feature ID: 2584363

Hessville is an unincorporated community and census-designated place in Washington Township, Sandusky County, Ohio, United States. The population was 174 at the 2020 census.

== History ==
Hessville was laid out in 1837 by David Hess, and named for him. A post office called Hessville was established in 1883, and remained in operation until 1903. The first known carousel in the United States with surviving historical records was opened in the 1840s in Hessville by Franz Wiesenoffer.
