= Frederick Fabing House =

Historic house in Ohio, United States

- U.S. National Register of Historic Places
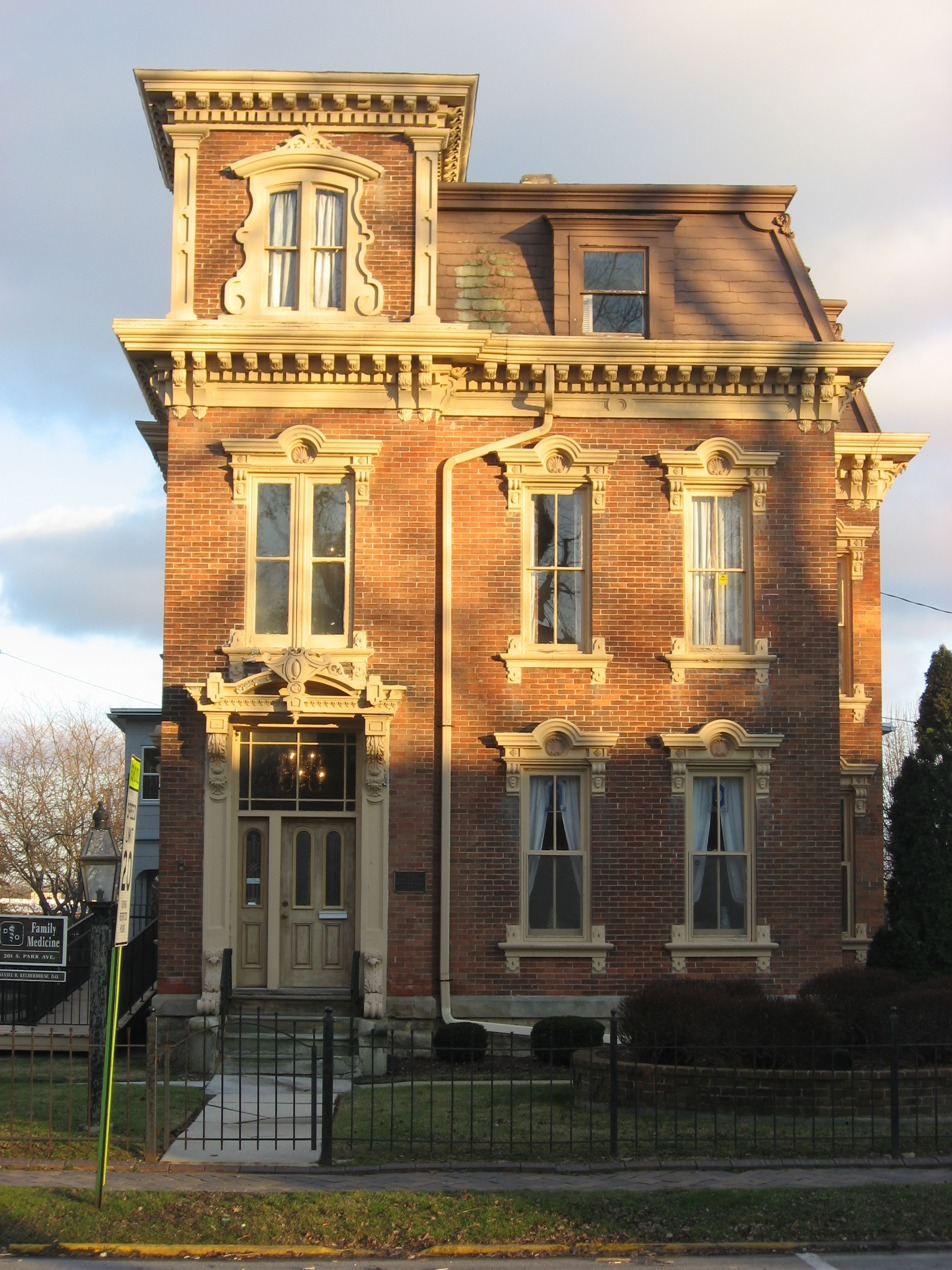
- Front of the house

- Location within Ohio Location within the United States
- Location: 201 S. Park Ave., Fremont, Ohio
- Coordinates: 41°20′43″N 83°7′1″W
- Area: Less than 1 acre (0.40 ha)
- Built: 1859
- Architectural style: Second Empire
- NRHP reference No.: 83002054
- Added to NRHP: May 26, 1983

The Frederick Fabing House is a historic residence in Fremont, Ohio, United States. Built as the home of one of the area's richest men, it has been designated a historic site.

Born in 1832, Frederick Fabing became one of Sandusky County's leading businessmen by the late nineteenth century. At the age of thirty, he joined three other local businessmen to buy a dying gasworks, steamfitting, and plumbing company in Fremont; they succeeded in making it profitable, and it remained in business for several decades. For nearly thirty years, Fabing worked for the company, rising from a superintendent's position to the presidency.

Fabing arranged for the construction of the present house in 1859, before he entered into the gasworks business. Three stories tall and built of brick, Fabing's house is one of the most distinctive pieces of architecture in the city. Most surviving buildings in Fremont are no older than the late nineteenth century, and various vernacular styles are prevalent; the 1850s Second Empire architecture of the Fabing House is radically different from many surrounding structures. Among its prominent features are a square tower with a mansard roof, an ornamental overdoor, a large bracketed cornice with dentils, elaborate metalwork and dormer windows, a multi-part frieze, and decorative hoodmolds.

By the late twentieth century, Fabing's house was no longer exclusively a residence; it had become both home and office for a local physician. While serving as such, the house was listed on the National Register of Historic Places in mid-1983; it qualified for inclusion both because of its distinctive architecture and because of its place as the home of a leading local citizen. It is one of thirteen Sandusky County sites on the Register and one of three in a two-block stretch of Park Avenue.
