= Erlin, Ohio =

Unincorporated community in Ohio, U.S.

Coordinates: 41°21′57″N 83°00′45″W

Erlin is an unincorporated community in Sandusky County, in the U.S. state of Ohio.

== History ==
A post office called Erlin was established in 1883, and remained in operation until 1910. Besides the post office, Erlin had a railroad station.
