= Christopher C. Layman Law Office =

- U.S. National Register of Historic Places
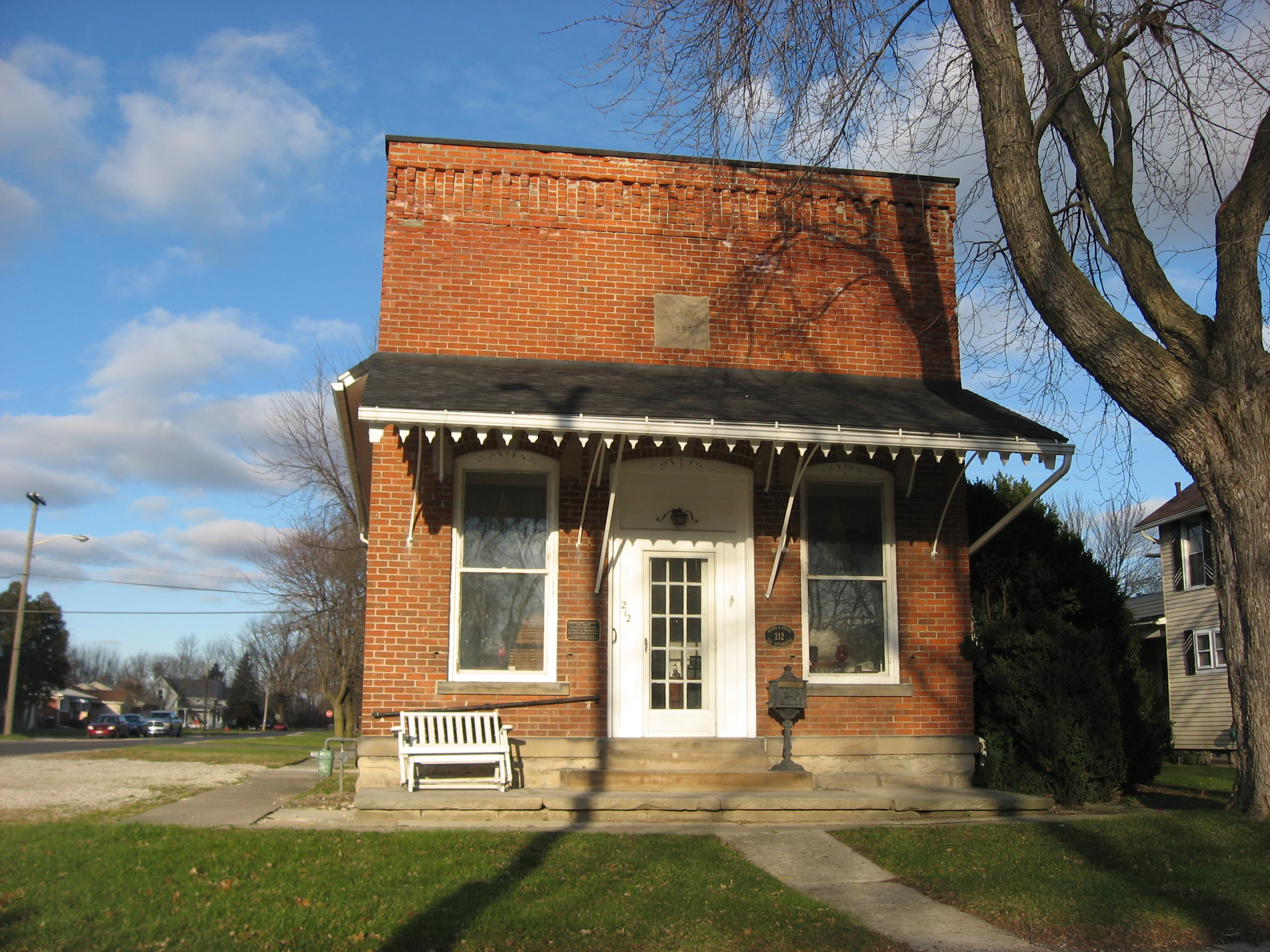
- Front of the office

- Location within Ohio Location within the United States
- Location: 212 W. First St., Woodville, Ohio
- Coordinates: 41°27′8″N 83°21′52″W
- Area: Less than 1 acre (0.40 ha)
- Built: 1890
- Architectural style: Italianate
- NRHP reference No.: 86001062
- Added to NRHP: May 15, 1986

The Christopher C. Layman Law Office is a historic commercial building in the village of Woodville in the northern part of the U.S. state of Ohio. Built in the late nineteenth century, it has been used for multiple purposes, and it has been designated a historic site.

A native of the Canton of Bern in Switzerland, Christopher Layman settled in Ohio in 1847 at the age of two. Throughout the Civil War, he fought in the Army of the Tennessee; after discharge in 1865, he enrolled at the University of Michigan Law School. Following his graduation, he practiced law in Michigan for a time before beginning practice in Columbus, Ohio in 1882. Before long, he moved to Woodville, where he opened the village's first law firm in 1884. After six years of practicing, he arranged for the erection of the current structure.

Built in 1890 in the Italianate style of architecture, Layman's law office is a brick building with a foundation of limestone plus various sandstone elements. Rather than the grand construction found in many Italianate buildings, the Layman Law Office is a modest commercial structure. Here Layman fulfilled many responsibilities: besides serving as the village's first lawyer, he held office as a justice of the peace and became an agent for multiple insurance companies.

Upon Layman's death, his will specified that the property be devised to the local public school district. From 1924 to 1964 the building served as the office of Dr. Chester Egger, Woodville's general practitioner and surgeon. Since that time, it has reverted to its original use; the office is used by John S. Spore and Associates, a law firm. In 1986, the property was listed on the National Register of Historic Places, qualifying both because of its architectural significance and because of its connection to Layman, who was considered a leading local citizen.
