= Burgoon, Ohio =

- Village
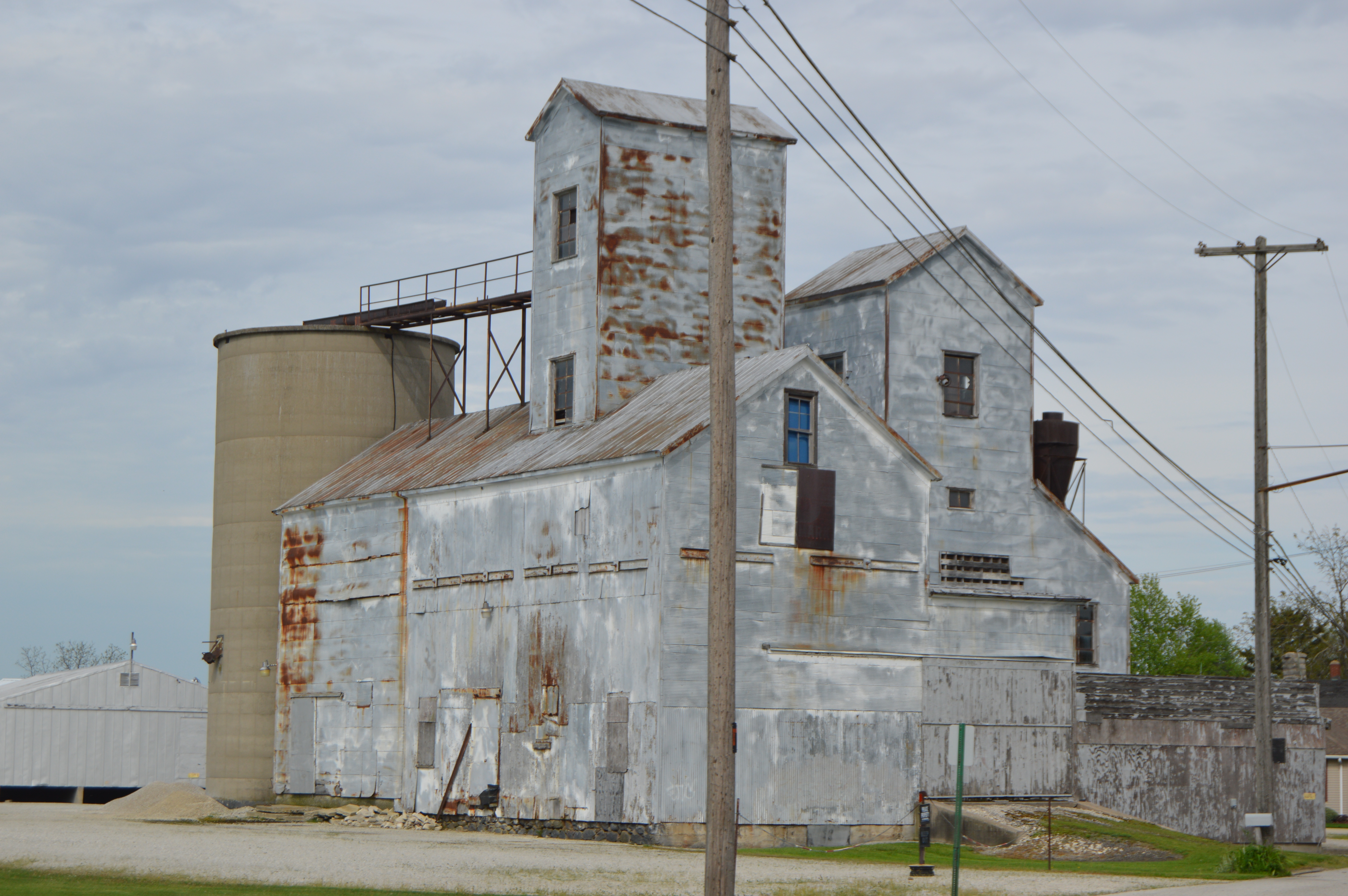
- Community grain elevator

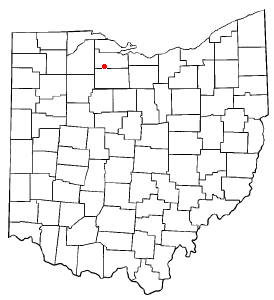
- Location of Burgoon, Ohio

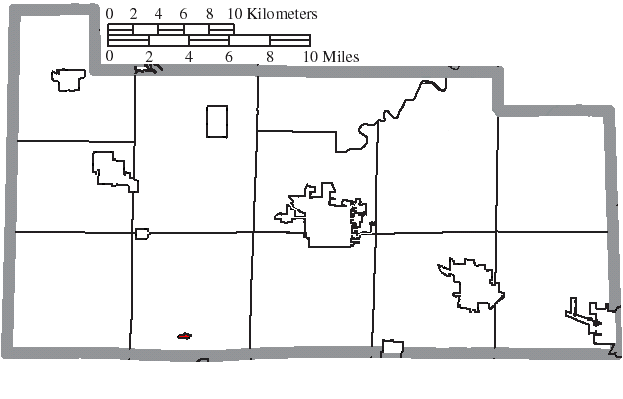
- Location of Burgoon in Sandusky County
- Coordinates: 41°16′02″N 83°14′55″W
- Country: United States
- State: Ohio
- County: Sandusky
- Township: Sandusky

Area
  - Total: 0.14 sq mi (0.36 km^{2})
  - Land: 0.14 sq mi (0.36 km^{2})
  - Water: 0 sq mi (0.00 km^{2})
- Elevation: 709 ft (216 m)

Population (2020)
  - Total: 183
  - Estimate (2023): 178
  - Density: 1,322.1/sq mi (510.45/km^{2})
- Time zone: UTC-5 (Eastern (EST))
  - Summer (DST): UTC-4 (EDT)
- ZIP code: 43407
- Area code: 419
- FIPS code: 39-10282
- GNIS feature ID: 2397498

Burgoon (/ˈbɜːrɡuːn/ BUR-goon) is a village in Sandusky County, Ohio, United States. The population was 183 at the 2020 census.

== History ==
A post office called Burgoon has been in operation since 1873. The village is named after Isadore H. Burgoon, a railroad official. An exhibit on I.H. Burgoon can be found at the Rutherford B. Hayes Presidential Center in Fremont.

== Geography ==
According to the United States Census Bureau, the village has a total area of 0.12 square miles (0.31 km^{2}), all land.

== Demographics ==
Historical population
Census	Pop.	Note	%±
1880	110		—
1920	208		—
1930	246		18.3%
1940	267		8.5%
1950	223		−16.5%
1960	243		9.0%
1970	221		−9.1%
1980	244		10.4%
1990	224		−8.2%
2000	199		−11.2%
2010	172		−13.6%
2020	183		6.4%
2023 (est.)	178	▼	−2.7%
U.S. Decennial Census

=== 2010 census ===
As of the census of 2010, there were 172 people, 67 households, and 47 families living in the village. The population density was 1,433.3 inhabitants per square mile (553.4/km^{2}). There were 76 housing units at an average density of 633.3 per square mile (244.5/km^{2}). The racial makeup of the village was 95.9% White, 0.6% Native American, 0.6% Asian, and 2.9% from other races. Hispanic or Latino of any race were 7.0% of the population.

There were 67 households, of which 35.8% had children under the age of 18 living with them, 47.8% were married couples living together, 13.4% had a female householder with no husband present, 9.0% had a male householder with no wife present, and 29.9% were non-families. 23.9% of all households were made up of individuals, and 10.5% had someone living alone who was 65 years of age or older. The average household size was 2.57 and the average family size was 3.04.

The median age in the village was 39.8 years. 25.6% of residents were under the age of 18; 7.6% were between the ages of 18 and 24; 25.1% were from 25 to 44; 26.1% were from 45 to 64; and 15.7% were 65 years of age or older. The gender makeup of the village was 48.8% male and 51.2% female.

=== 2000 census ===
As of the census of 2000, there were 199 people, 68 households, and 56 families living in the village. The population density was 2,210.6 inhabitants per square mile (853.5/km^{2}). There were 78 housing units at an average density of 866.5 per square mile (334.6/km^{2}). The racial makeup of the village was 94.47% White, 1.51% Asian, 2.51% from other races, and 1.51% from two or more races. Hispanic or Latino of any race were 5.03% of the population.

There were 68 households, out of which 38.2% had children under the age of 18 living with them, 66.2% were married couples living together, 11.8% had a female householder with no husband present, and 17.6% were non-families. 16.2% of all households were made up of individuals, and 8.8% had someone living alone who was 65 years of age or older. The average household size was 2.93 and the average family size was 3.27.

In the village, the population was spread out, with 33.7% under the age of 18, 5.0% from 18 to 24, 29.6% from 25 to 44, 20.6% from 45 to 64, and 11.1% who were 65 years of age or older. The median age was 34 years. For every 100 females there were 111.7 males. For every 100 females age 18 and over, there were 106.3 males.

The median income for a household in the village was $54,063, and the median income for a family was $58,125. Males had a median income of $40,625 versus $25,662 for females. The per capita income for the village was $18,934. None of the families and 1.1% of the population were living below the poverty line.
