= Helena, Ohio =

- Village
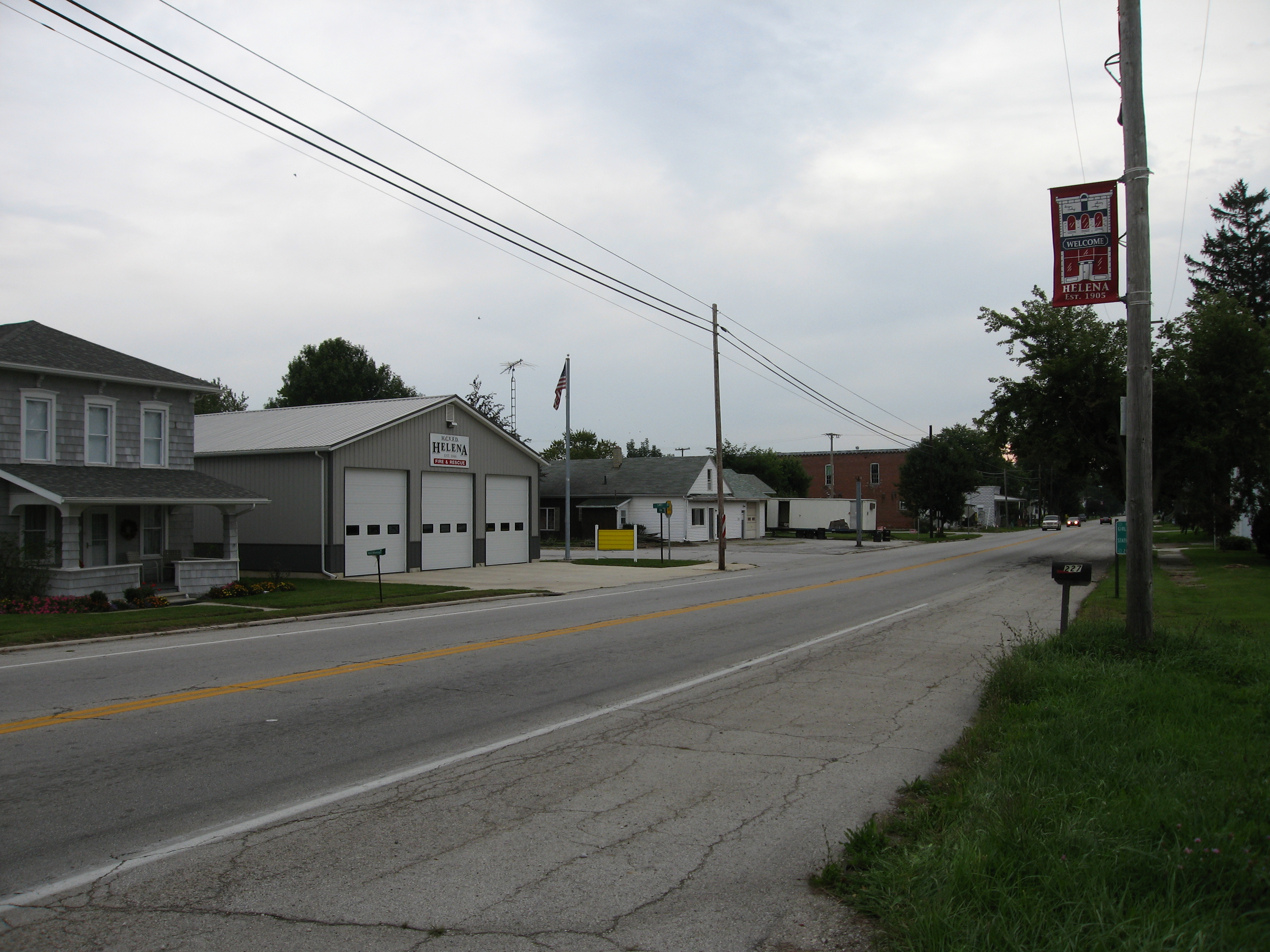
- Main Street in Helena

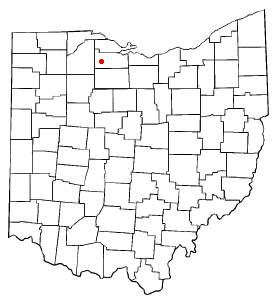
- Location of Helena, Ohio

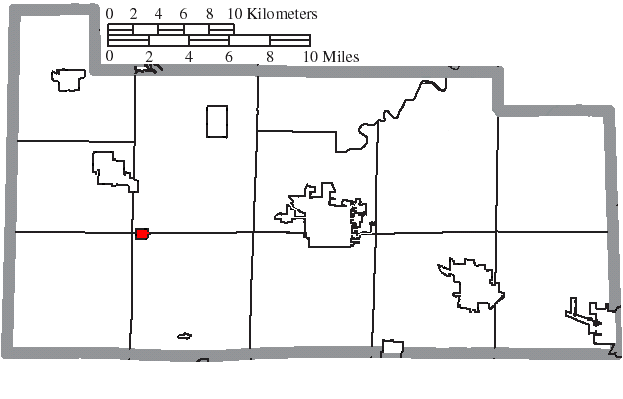
- Location of Helena in Sandusky County
- Coordinates: 41°20′25″N 83°17′31″W
- Country: United States
- State: Ohio
- County: Sandusky
- Township: Sandusky

Area
  - Total: 0.29 sq mi (0.75 km^{2})
  - Land: 0.29 sq mi (0.75 km^{2})
  - Water: 0 sq mi (0.00 km^{2})
- Elevation: 696 ft (212 m)

Population (2020)
  - Total: 211
  - Estimate (2023): 209
  - Density: 726.3/sq mi (280.41/km^{2})
- Time zone: UTC-5 (Eastern (EST))
  - Summer (DST): UTC-4 (EDT)
- ZIP code: 43435
- Area code: 419
- FIPS code: 39-34860
- GNIS feature ID: 2398484
- Website: https://villageofhelena.org/

Helena (/ˈhɛlənə/ HEL-ən-ə) is a village in Sandusky County, Ohio, United States. The population was 211 at the 2020 census.

== History ==
Helena was laid out in 1871 when the Pittsburgh, Fort Wayne & Chicago Railroad was extended to that point. The village was named in honor of Helena Thompson, the daughter of a local doctor.

== Geography ==
According to the United States Census Bureau, the village has a total area of 0.30 square miles (0.78 km^{2}), all land.

== Demographics ==
Historical population
Census	Pop.	Note	%±
1880	111		—
1910	305		—
1920	209		−31.5%
1930	238		13.9%
1940	268		12.6%
1950	314		17.2%
1960	281		−10.5%
1970	298		6.0%
1980	307		3.0%
1990	267		−13.0%
2000	236		−11.6%
2010	224		−5.1%
2020	211		−5.8%
2023 (est.)	209	▼	−0.9%
U.S. Decennial Census

=== 2010 census ===
As of the census of 2010, there were 224 people, 97 households, and 64 families living in the village. The population density was 746.7 inhabitants per square mile (288.3/km^{2}). There were 102 housing units at an average density of 340.0 per square mile (131.3/km^{2}). The racial makeup of the village was 99.6% White and 0.4% from other races. Hispanic or Latino of any race were 3.6% of the population.

There were 97 households, of which 27.8% had children under the age of 18 living with them, 53.6% were married couples living together, 5.2% had a female householder with no husband present, 7.2% had a male householder with no wife present, and 34.0% were non-families. 27.8% of all households were made up of individuals, and 9.2% had someone living alone who was 65 years of age or older. The average household size was 2.31 and the average family size was 2.73.

The median age in the village was 41.8 years. 20.5% of residents were under the age of 18; 9.1% were between the ages of 18 and 24; 23.7% were from 25 to 44; 33.1% were from 45 to 64; and 13.8% were 65 years of age or older. The gender makeup of the village was 54.9% male and 45.1% female.

=== 2000 census ===
As of the census of 2000, there were 236 people, 98 households, and 76 families living in the village. The population density was 794.2 inhabitants per square mile (306.6/km^{2}). There were 104 housing units at an average density of 350.0 per square mile (135.1/km^{2}). The racial makeup of the village was 97.03% White, 2.97% from other races. Hispanic or Latino of any race were 6.36% of the population.

There were 98 households, out of which 30.6% had children under the age of 18 living with them, 68.4% were married couples living together, 6.1% had a female householder with no husband present, and 22.4% were non-families. 20.4% of all households were made up of individuals, and 8.2% had someone living alone who was 65 years of age or older. The average household size was 2.41 and the average family size was 2.75.

In the village, the population was spread out, with 24.2% under the age of 18, 4.7% from 18 to 24, 25.8% from 25 to 44, 28.4% from 45 to 64, and 16.9% who were 65 years of age or older. The median age was 42 years. For every 100 females there were 101.7 males. For every 100 females age 18 and over, there were 98.9 males.

The median income for a household in the village was $37,292, and the median income for a family was $35,938. Males had a median income of $44,063 versus $22,500 for females. The per capita income for the village was $18,440. About 11.3% of families and 12.4% of the population were below the poverty line, including 28.3% of those under the age of eighteen and none of those 65 or over.
