= Sandusky County, Ohio =

County in Ohio, United States

- County
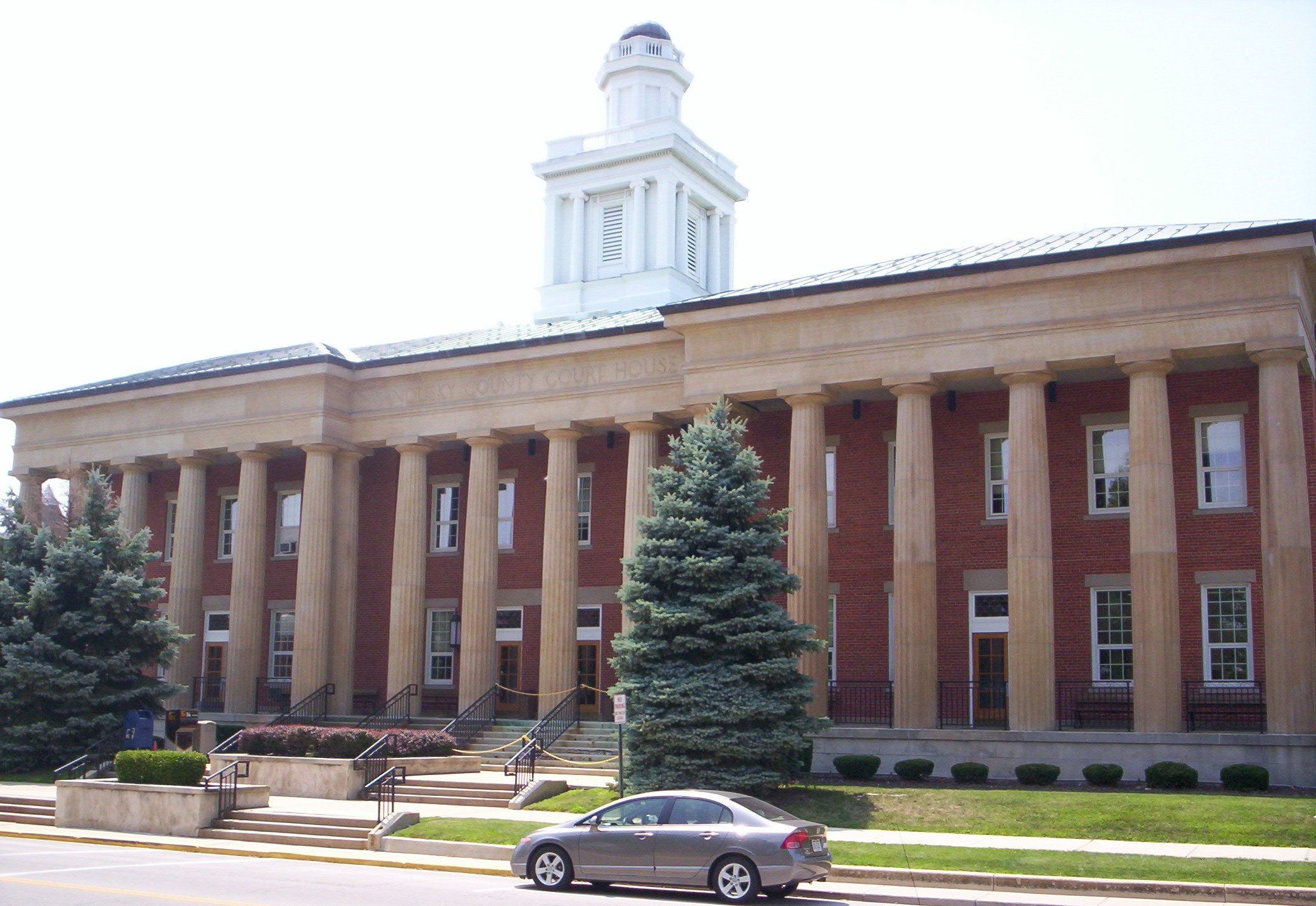
- Sandusky County Courthouse in Fremont

- Flag Seal

- Location within the U.S. state of Ohio
- Coordinates: 41°22′N 83°09′W
- Country: United States
- State: Ohio
- Founded: February 12, 1820
- Named for: Sandusky River
- Seat: Fremont
- Largest city: Fremont

Area
  - Total: 418 sq mi (1,080 km^{2})
  - Land: 408 sq mi (1,060 km^{2})
  - Water: 9.3 sq mi (24 km^{2}) 2.2%

Population (2020)
  - Total: 58,896
  - Estimate (2025): 58,655 ▼
  - Density: 140/sq mi (54/km^{2})
- Time zone: UTC−5 (Eastern)
  - Summer (DST): UTC−4 (EDT)
- Congressional district: 9th
- Website: sanduskycountyoh.gov

Sandusky County is a county located in the northwestern part of the U.S. state of Ohio. As of the 2020 census, the population was 58,896. Its county seat and largest city is Fremont. The county was formed on February 12, 1820, from portions of Huron County. The name is derived from the Wyandot word meaning "water" (Wyandot: saandustee). The Sandusky River runs diagonally northeast through the county to its mouth on Sandusky Bay, opening into Lake Erie. Sandusky County compromises the Fremont, OH Micropolitan Statistical Area.

== Geography ==
According to the U.S. Census Bureau, the county has a total area of 418 square miles (1,080 km^{2}), of which 408 square miles (1,060 km^{2}) is land and 9.3 square miles (24 km^{2}) (2.2%) is water.

=== Adjacent counties ===
- Ottawa County (north)
- Erie County (east)
- Huron County (southeast)
- Seneca County (south)
- Wood County (west)

== Demographics ==
Historical population
Census	Pop.	Note	%±
1820	852		—
1830	2,851		234.6%
1840	10,182		257.1%
1850	14,305		40.5%
1860	21,429		49.8%
1870	25,503		19.0%
1880	32,057		25.7%
1890	30,617		−4.5%
1900	34,311		12.1%
1910	35,171		2.5%
1920	37,109		5.5%
1930	39,731		7.1%
1940	41,014		3.2%
1950	46,114		12.4%
1960	56,486		22.5%
1970	60,983		8.0%
1980	63,267		3.7%
1990	61,963		−2.1%
2000	61,792		−0.3%
2010	60,944		−1.4%
2020	58,896		−3.4%
2025 (est.)	58,655	▼	−0.4%
U.S. Decennial Census; 1790–1960 1900–1990; 1990–2000 2020

=== 2020 census ===
As of the 2020 census, the county had a population of 58,896. The median age was 43.2 years. 22.0% of residents were under the age of 18 and 20.2% of residents were 65 years of age or older. For every 100 females there were 98.3 males, and for every 100 females age 18 and over there were 96.9 males age 18 and over.

The racial makeup of the county was 85.6% White, 3.2% Black or African American, 0.3% American Indian and Alaska Native, 0.3% Asian, <0.1% Native Hawaiian and Pacific Islander, 3.1% from some other race, and 7.4% from two or more races. Hispanic or Latino residents of any race comprised 10.3% of the population.

56.8% of residents lived in urban areas, while 43.2% lived in rural areas.

There were 24,444 households in the county, of which 27.5% had children under the age of 18 living in them. Of all households, 47.0% were married-couple households, 19.5% were households with a male householder and no spouse or partner present, and 25.7% were households with a female householder and no spouse or partner present. About 29.3% of all households were made up of individuals and 13.5% had someone living alone who was 65 years of age or older.

There were 26,479 housing units, of which 7.7% were vacant. Among occupied housing units, 73.5% were owner-occupied and 26.5% were renter-occupied. The homeowner vacancy rate was 1.4% and the rental vacancy rate was 6.5%.

=== Racial and ethnic composition ===
Sandusky County, Ohio – Racial and ethnic composition Note: the US Census treats Hispanic/Latino as an ethnic category. This table excludes Latinos from the racial categories and assigns them to a separate category. Hispanics/Latinos may be of any race.
Race / ethnicity (NH = Non-Hispanic)	Pop 1980	Pop 1990	Pop 2000	Pop 2010	Pop 2020	% 1980	% 1990	% 2000	% 2010	% 2020
White alone (NH)	58,468	56,687	55,015	52,527	48,219	92.41%	91.49%	89.03%	86.19%	81.87%
Black or African American alone (NH)	1,306	1,490	1,620	1,624	1,762	2.06%	2.40%	2.62%	2.66%	2.99%
Native American or Alaska Native alone (NH)	75	88	62	96	75	0.12%	0.14%	0.10%	0.16%	0.13%
Asian alone (NH)	101	128	170	185	202	0.16%	0.21%	0.28%	0.30%	0.34%
Native Hawaiian or Pacific Islander alone (NH)	x	x	5	7	7	x	x	0.01%	0.01%	0.01%
Other race alone (NH)	50	26	46	59	159	0.08%	0.04%	0.07%	0.10%	0.27%
Mixed race or Multiracial (NH)	x	x	576	1,011	2,417	x	x	0.93%	1.66%	4.10%
Hispanic or Latino (any race)	3,267	3,544	4,298	5,435	6,055	5.16%	5.72%	6.96%	8.92%	10.28%
Total	63,267	61,963	61,792	60,944	58,896	100.00%	100.00%	100.00%	100.00%	100.00%

=== 2010 census ===
As of the 2010 United States census, there were 60,944 people, 24,182 households, and 16,616 families living in the county. The population density was 149.2 inhabitants per square mile (57.6/km^{2}). There were 26,390 housing units at an average density of 64.6 units per square mile (24.9 units/km^{2}). The racial makeup of the county was 91.2% white, 2.8% black or African American, 0.3% Asian, 0.2% American Indian, 2.8% from other races, and 2.6% from two or more races. Those of Hispanic or Latino origin made up 8.9% of the population. In terms of ancestry, 41.9% were German, 12.1% were Irish, 9.5% were English, and 7.1% were American.

Of the 24,182 households, 32.0% had children under the age of 18 living with them, 51.3% were married couples living together, 12.1% had a female householder with no husband present, 31.3% were non-families, and 26.3% of all households were made up of individuals. The average household size was 2.48 and the average family size was 2.97. The median age was 40.4 years.

The median income for a household in the county was $48,056 and the median income for a family was $57,500. Males had a median income of $42,582 versus $31,257 for females. The per capita income for the county was $22,286. About 7.2% of families and 10.9% of the population were below the poverty line, including 15.8% of those under age 18 and 6.5% of those age 65 or over.

=== 2000 census ===
As of the census of 2000, there were 61,792 people, 23,717 households, and 16,957 families living in the county. The population density was 151 inhabitants per square mile (58/km^{2}). There were 25,253 housing units at an average density of 62 units per square mile (24/km^{2}). The racial makeup of the county was 92.20% White, 2.67% Black or African American, 0.13% Native American, 0.29% Asian, 0.01% Pacific Islander, 3.10% from other races, and 1.61% from two or more races. 6.96% of the population were Hispanic or Latino of any race.

There were 23,717 households, out of which 33.30% had children under the age of 18 living with them, 56.50% were married couples living together, 10.50% had a female householder with no husband present, and 28.50% were non-families. 24.10% of all households were made up of individuals, and 10.60% had someone living alone who was 65 years of age or older. The average household size was 2.56 and the average family size was 3.04.

In the county, the population was spread out, with 26.20% under the age of 18, 8.10% from 18 to 24, 28.30% from 25 to 44, 23.00% from 45 to 64, and 14.50% who were 65 years of age or older. The median age was 37 years. For every 100 females there were 95.90 males. For every 100 females age 18 and over, there were 92.60 males.

The median income for a household in the county was $40,584, and the median income for a family was $47,675. Males had a median income of $35,501 versus $23,964 for females. The per capita income for the county was $19,239. About 5.70% of families and 7.50% of the population were below the poverty line, including 9.10% of those under age 18 and 7.00% of those age 65 or over.

== Government and politics ==
Like most of northwestern Ohio, Sandusky County voters have historically supported the Republican Party. It was initially settled by migrants from the Northern Tier of New England and New York, who carried their culture with them. The county has a strong history of supporting Republican presidential candidates as well as local Republican candidates.

During the 2008 U.S. presidential election, 51% of the voters from Sandusky County supported Democratic candidate Barack Obama. It was the second time since 1964 that the county had supported a Democrat for president, and the second time since 1932 that it had done so with a majority. Obama narrowly carried the county again in the 2012 U.S. presidential election with just under 50 percent of the vote. Time magazine listed Sandusky as one of five critical counties in the 2012 election. In 2016 and 2020 the county supported the Republican candidate.

United States presidential election results for Sandusky County, Ohio
Year	Republican		Democratic		Third party(ies)	
Year	No.	%	No.	%	No.	%
1856	1,548	48.50%	1,599	50.09%	45	1.41%
1860	1,938	45.28%	2,319	54.18%	23	0.54%
1864	2,294	49.09%	2,379	50.91%	0	0.00%
1868	2,443	46.19%	2,846	53.81%	0	0.00%
1872	2,380	46.26%	2,729	53.04%	36	0.70%
1876	3,032	47.31%	3,330	51.96%	47	0.73%
1880	3,059	44.49%	3,640	52.94%	177	2.57%
1884	3,130	45.10%	3,684	53.08%	126	1.82%
1888	3,218	44.10%	3,917	53.68%	162	2.22%
1892	2,960	41.25%	3,774	52.60%	441	6.15%
1896	3,970	43.28%	5,105	55.66%	97	1.06%
1900	4,003	44.26%	4,915	54.35%	126	1.39%
1904	4,208	50.38%	3,787	45.34%	358	4.29%
1908	4,079	42.74%	5,242	54.93%	222	2.33%
1912	1,576	18.43%	4,333	50.66%	2,644	30.91%
1916	3,557	39.36%	5,264	58.25%	216	2.39%
1920	8,933	61.77%	5,295	36.62%	233	1.61%
1924	9,381	60.88%	4,388	28.48%	1,639	10.64%
1928	12,200	67.33%	5,834	32.20%	85	0.47%
1932	8,915	45.74%	10,299	52.84%	276	1.42%
1936	8,692	42.89%	9,171	45.26%	2,402	11.85%
1940	14,054	66.39%	7,116	33.61%	0	0.00%
1944	13,763	69.19%	6,129	30.81%	0	0.00%
1948	10,847	59.93%	7,216	39.87%	36	0.20%
1952	14,939	71.18%	6,048	28.82%	0	0.00%
1956	15,009	72.52%	5,687	27.48%	0	0.00%
1960	14,566	64.06%	8,171	35.94%	0	0.00%
1964	8,254	37.98%	13,481	62.02%	0	0.00%
1968	11,696	53.10%	8,581	38.96%	1,748	7.94%
1972	15,489	63.63%	8,308	34.13%	546	2.24%
1976	13,074	52.58%	11,202	45.05%	591	2.38%
1980	13,420	55.53%	8,482	35.10%	2,264	9.37%
1984	17,214	66.16%	8,564	32.91%	242	0.93%
1988	14,203	58.61%	9,709	40.07%	320	1.32%
1992	10,772	39.21%	9,878	35.96%	6,822	24.83%
1996	10,033	39.48%	11,547	45.44%	3,833	15.08%
2000	13,699	53.21%	11,146	43.30%	899	3.49%
2004	16,224	55.92%	12,686	43.72%	104	0.36%
2008	14,192	46.72%	15,602	51.36%	583	1.92%
2012	13,755	47.28%	14,541	49.98%	799	2.75%
2016	16,316	57.68%	9,929	35.10%	2,040	7.21%
2020	18,896	62.72%	10,596	35.17%	636	2.11%
2024	19,311	64.74%	10,139	33.99%	377	1.26%

United States Senate election results for Sandusky County, Ohio1
Year	Republican		Democratic		Third party(ies)	
Year	No.	%	No.	%	No.	%
2024	16,951	57.94%	10,782	36.86%	1,522	5.20%

=== County officials ===
Office	Name	Party
Commissioner	Scott Miller	Republican
Commissioner	Charles Schwochow	Republican
Commissioner	Russ Zimmerman	Republican
Prosecutor	Beth A. Tischler	Republican
Sheriff	Christopher J. Hilton	Republican
Clerk of Courts	Chris Schneider	Republican
Recorder	Colleen Carmack	Republican
Treasurer	Kimberley Foreman	Republican
Engineer	Carlos Baez	Republican
Coroner	James Williams	Democrat
Auditor	Jerri A. Miller	Republican
Common Pleas Court Judge	Jon Ickes	Republican
Common Pleas Court Judge	Jeremiah Ray	Democrat
County Courts Judge	John P. Kolesar	Democrat
County Courts Judge	Mary Elizabeth Fiser	Republican
Juvenile Court Judge	Brad Smith	Republican

== Transportation ==
=== Major highways ===
- Interstate 80 (Ohio Turnpike)
- Interstate 90 (Ohio Turnpike)
- U.S. Route 6
- U.S. Route 20
- U.S. Route 23

=== Other highways ===
- Ohio State Route 12
- Ohio State Route 18
- Ohio State Route 19
- Ohio State Route 51
- Ohio State Route 53
- Ohio State Route 101
- Ohio State Route 105
- Ohio State Route 300
- Ohio State Route 412
- Ohio State Route 510
- Ohio State Route 523
- Ohio State Route 582
- Ohio State Route 590
- Ohio State Route 600
- Ohio State Route 635

=== Airports ===
- Fremont Airport
- Sandusky County Regional Airport

== Communities ==
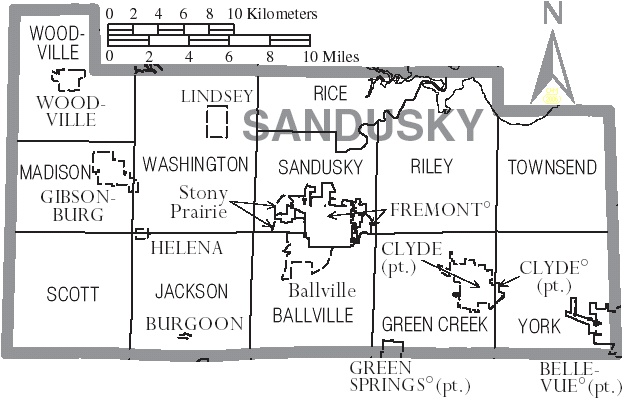
Map of Sandusky County, Ohio with municipal and township labels

=== Cities ===
- Bellevue
- Clyde
- Fremont (county seat)

=== Villages ===
- Burgoon
- Elmore
- Gibsonburg
- Green Springs
- Helena
- Lindsey
- Woodville

=== Townships ===
- Ballville
- Green Creek
- Jackson
- Madison
- Rice
- Riley
- Sandusky
- Scott
- Townsend
- Washington
- Woodville
- York

=== Census-designated places ===
- Ballville
- Hessville
- Stony Prairie
- Vickery
- Whites Landing
- Wightmans Grove

=== Unincorporated communities ===
- Colby
- Erlin
- Galetown
- Green Creek
- Havens
- Hessville
- Kingsway
- Millersville
- Rollersville
- Tinney
- Whitmore
- Winters Station
- York

== Places of interest ==
- H. J. Heinz Company ketchup factory (the world's largest)
- Mineral Springs at Green Springs, Ohio
- Rutherford B. Hayes Presidential Center
- Spiegel Grove
- Fremont Speedway

== See also ==
- National Register of Historic Places listings in Sandusky County, Ohio
