= Alice E. Johnson =

American architect

- Born: 1862; Fremont, Ohio
- Died: 13 February 1936, aged 73; Fremont, Ohio
- Occupation: architect
- Years active: 1889-1930

Alice E. Johnson (1862–1930) was an architect from Ohio, one of the first women architects in that state. Trained by her father, she inherited his practice when he died in 1901 and ran it successfully for the next thirty years.

Johnson was born in 1862 in Fremont, Ohio to John Carlton and Celia (née Sigler) Johnson. She studied architecture with her father, whose practice primarily focused on public buildings including courthouses, jails and schools.

The Fremont City Directory listed Johnson as an architect from 1889, and she was commissioned to build the Trinity United Methodist Church at the corner of Wayne and Court streets in Fremont in 1895. The church was featured in the book, Art Work of Seneca and Sandusky Counties for its Gothic Revival architecture. She succeeded to her father's business when he died in 1901 and continued with his clients, building both commercial and residential properties. The Ohio Architect and Engineer magazine reported in 1903 that she was designing in Fremont "a frame home for David B. Love and brick and stone home for W. B. Kridler". She designed and built properties in both northwest Ohio and neighboring states.

Johnson died on 13 February 1936 in Fremont, aged 73.
