= Henry Lehr =

Henry Lehr may refer to:

- Henry Solomon Lehr (1838–1923), American educator, founder of Ohio Northern University
- Henry Symes Lehr (1869–1929), American socialite
