= Timothy Lull =

Timothy F. Lull (April 8, 1943 – May 20, 2003) was a Lutheran minister, scholar and author.

== Early life ==
Lull was born to Raymond and Ruth Cole Lull in Fremont, Ohio. He attended Atkinson Elementary School, Fremont Junior High School, and Fremont Ross High School. From a young age he participated in the life of St. John's Lutheran Church and was a member of the church's Boy Scout Troop receiving his God and Country Award. Tim was interested in astronomy, philosophy, politics, and religion. He enjoyed playing the piano and baritone, was a leader in school activities, and an accomplished student. In eleventh grade he won the Ohio State History contest at Ohio University in Athens, Ohio. Graduating first in his high school class in 1961, Tim entered Williams College where he was the recipient of the Tyng Scholarship. He earned his bachelor's degree in philosophy from Williams in 1965 where he was elected to Phi Beta Kappa and the Gargoyle Society. Timothy attended Yale University, where he received a Master's of Divinity and a Doctorate of Philosophy.

== Ministerial life ==
Lull was ordained as a minister in the Lutheran Church in America in 1972. He served as pastor at Grace Lutheran Church in Needham, Massachusetts from the time of his ordination until 1977. From 1977 until 1989 Lull served as professor of systematic theology at the Lutheran Theological Seminary at Philadelphia. In 1989 Lull became Academic Dean and Professor of Systematic Theology at Pacific Lutheran Theological Seminary in Berkeley, California. Lull was elected president of the seminary in 1997 and held that position until his death from complications of surgery on May 20, 2003.

Timothy Lull was a prolific writer and widely sought speaker. His particular area of interest was the life and work of Martin Luther. He was the author of several books including Called to Confess Christ and My Conversations with Martin Luther. He edited Martin Luther's Basic Theological Writings for Augsburg Fortress. He was a frequent contributor and columnist for The Lutheran magazine. A strong advocate, interpreter, and participant in the ecumenical dialogs and agreements of the Evangelical Lutheran Church in America, Lull served as co-chair of the Lutheran-Reformed Committee for Theological Conversations, 1988–1992, which in A Common Calling formally proposed full communion between the ELCA and the Presbyterian Church USA, the Reformed Church in America, the United Church of Christ. He received the Joseph A. Sittler Award for Theological Leadership posthumously from Trinity Lutheran Seminary in Columbus, Ohio.

Lull married Mary Carlton O'Neal in 1969 and was the father of two sons, Christopher Lull and Peter Lull.

== Sources ==
- The News-Messenger, May 31, 2003
- The Philadelphia Inquirer, May 23, 2003
- The Lutheran, June 2003
