= All-American Truck Company =

Defunct American motor vehicle manufacturer

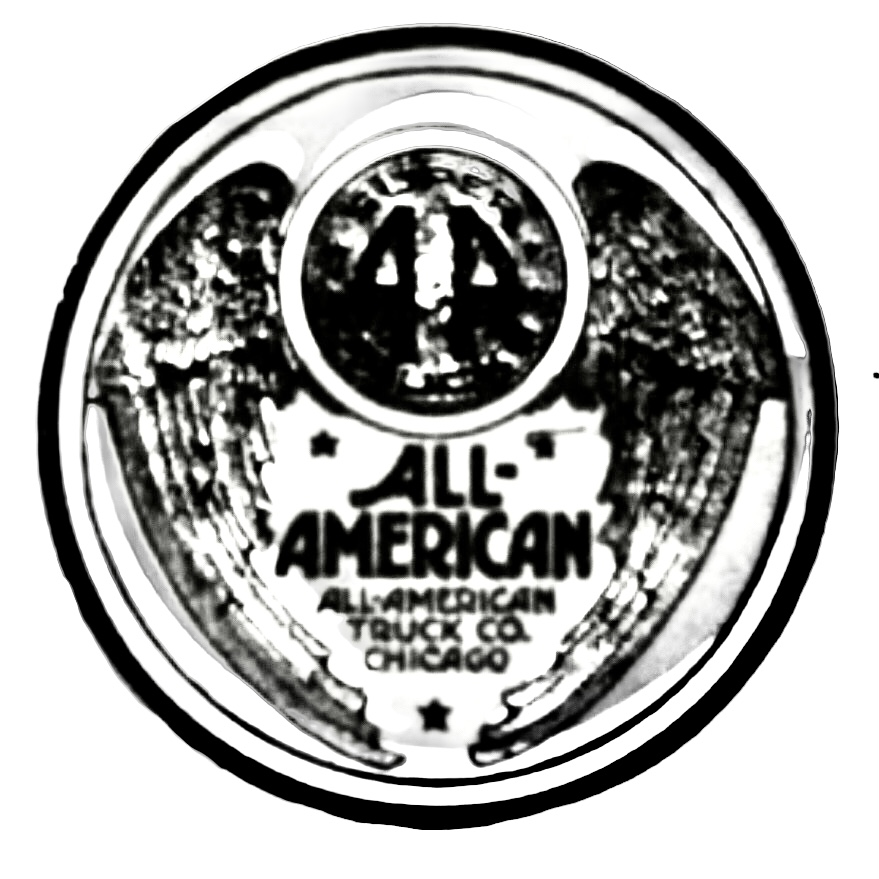
- Company type: Truck Company
- Industry: Manufacturing
- Founded: 1918; 108 years ago
- Defunct: 1922; 104 years ago
- Headquarters: Chicago, Illinois, US
- Products: Trucks

All-American Truck Company of Chicago, Illinois, was a truck manufacturer.

== History ==
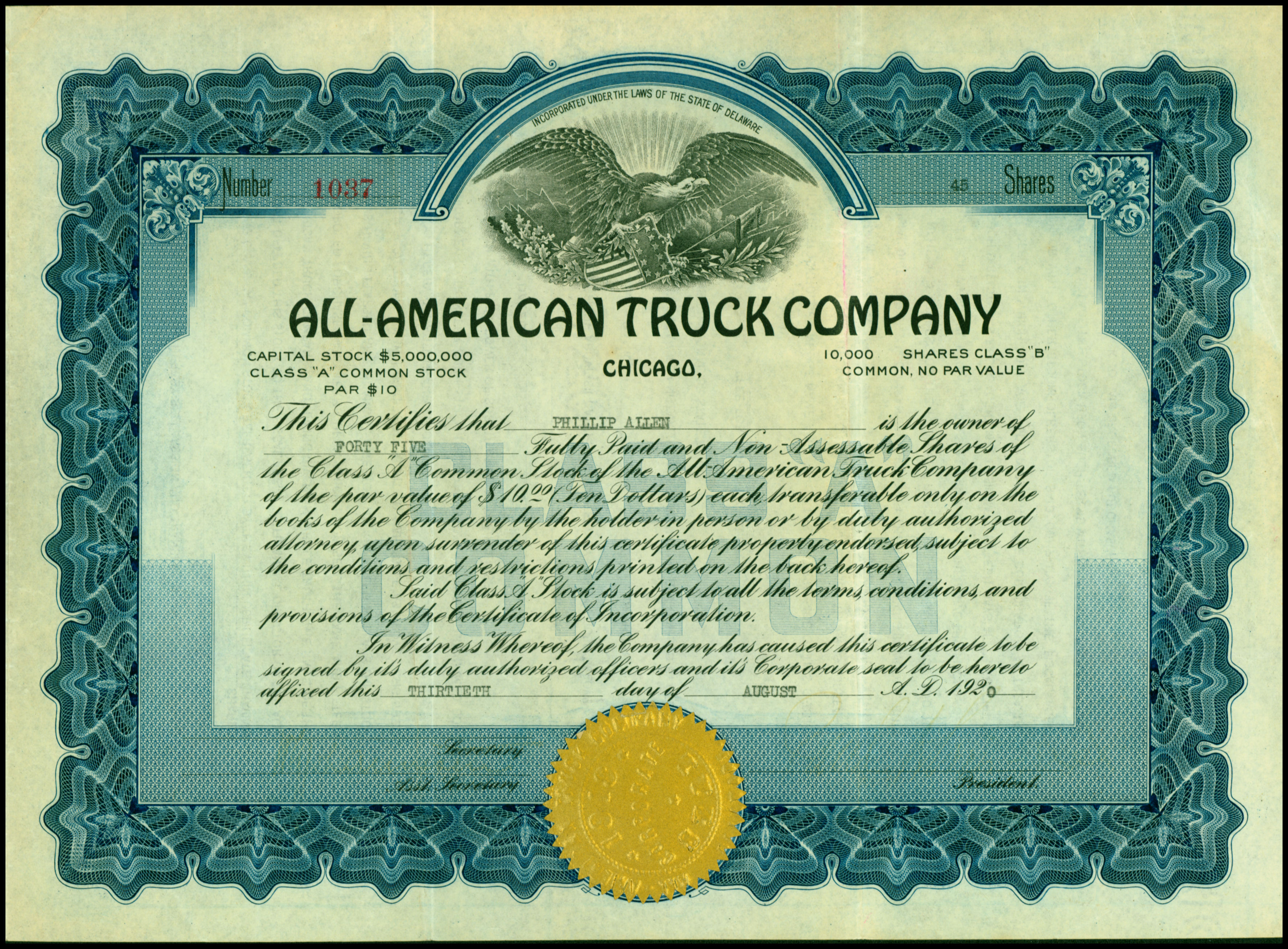
All-American Truck Comp. 1920

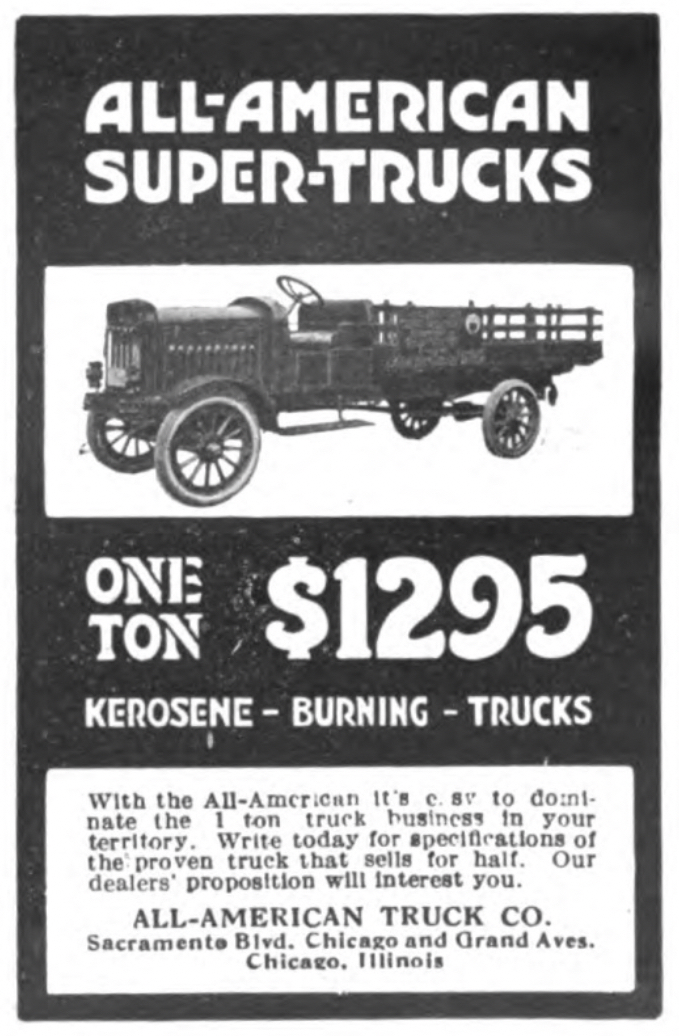
All-American advertisement (1919)

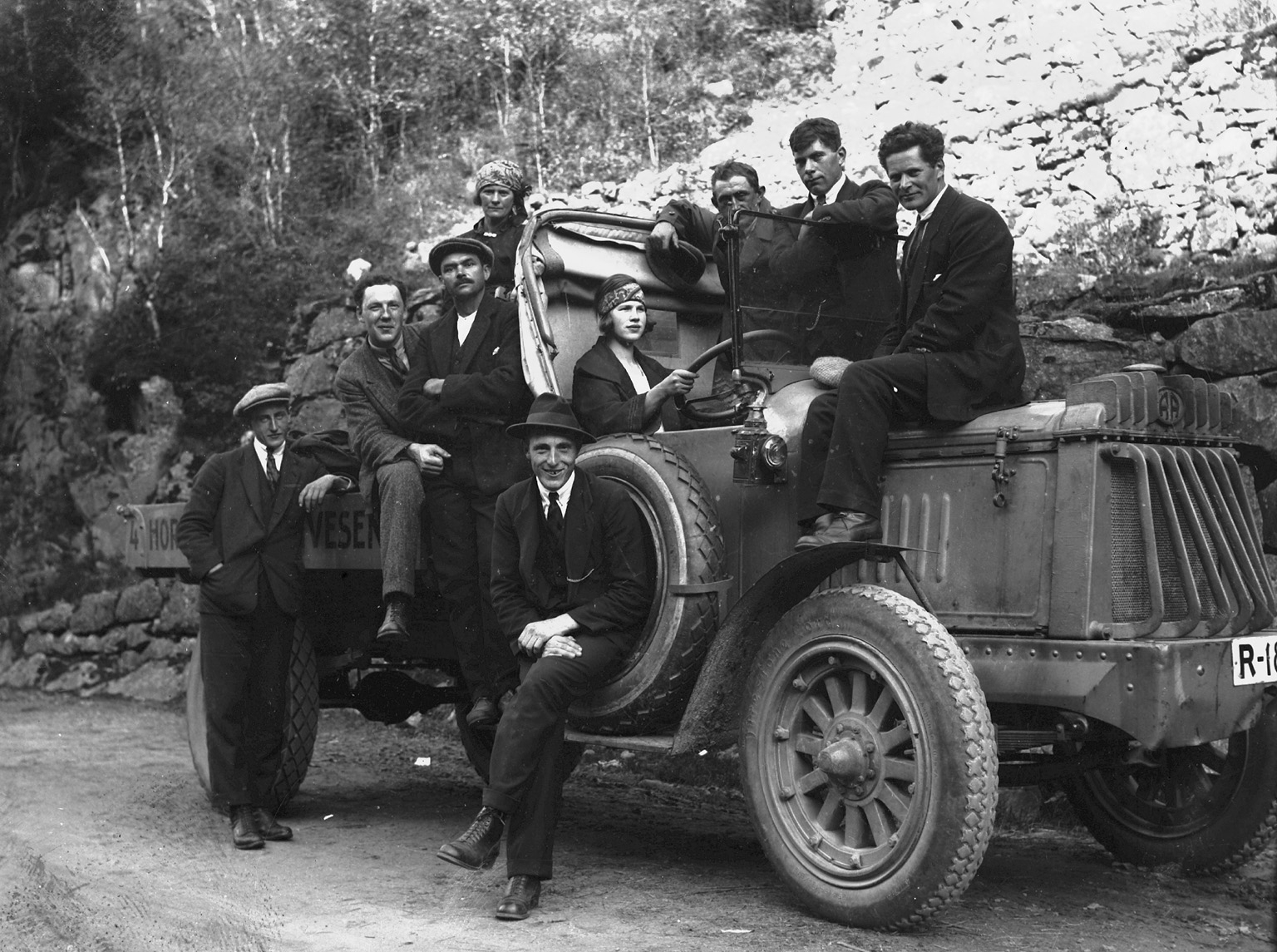
All-American Truck in Norway

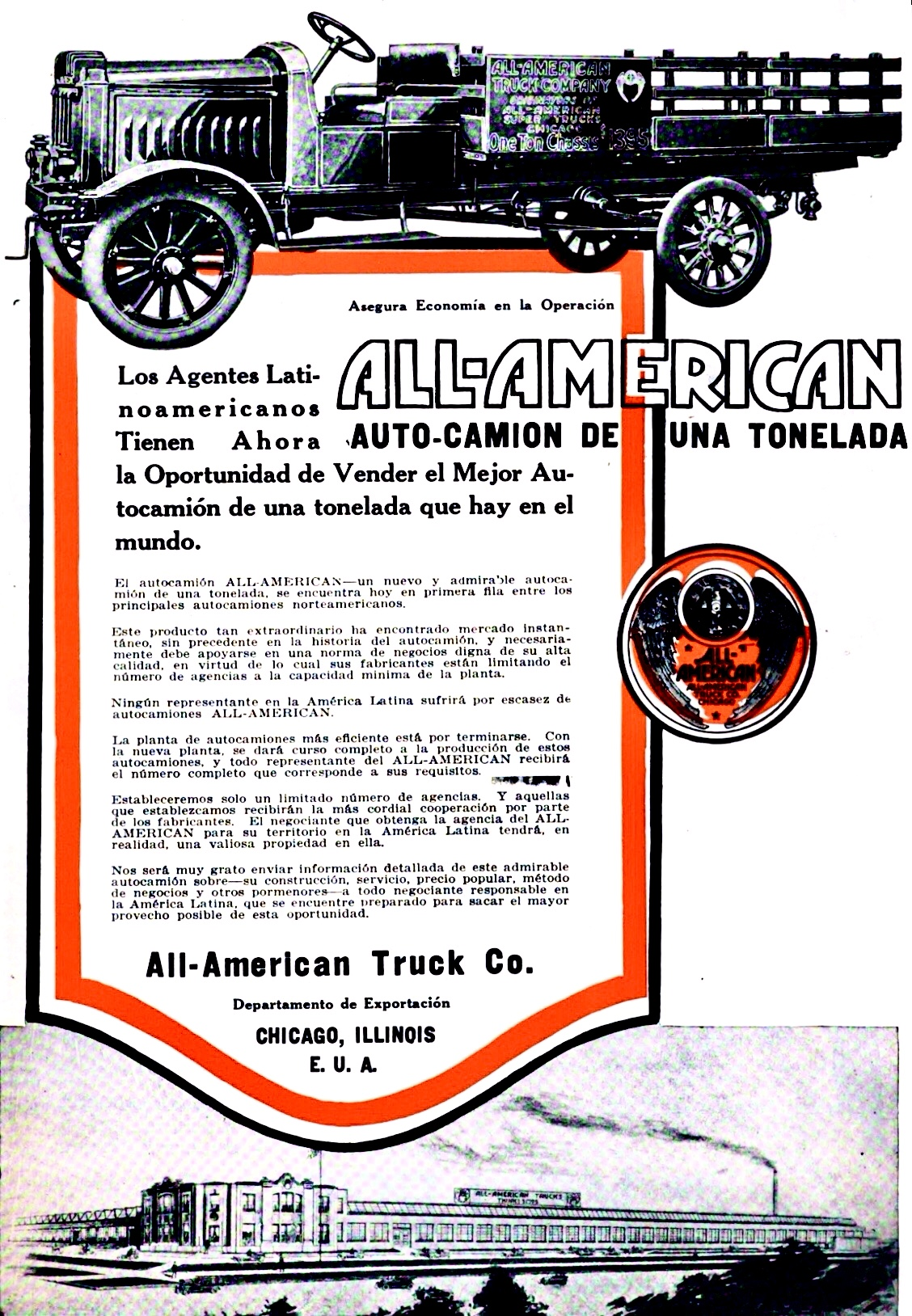
All-American 1t Truck (1920)

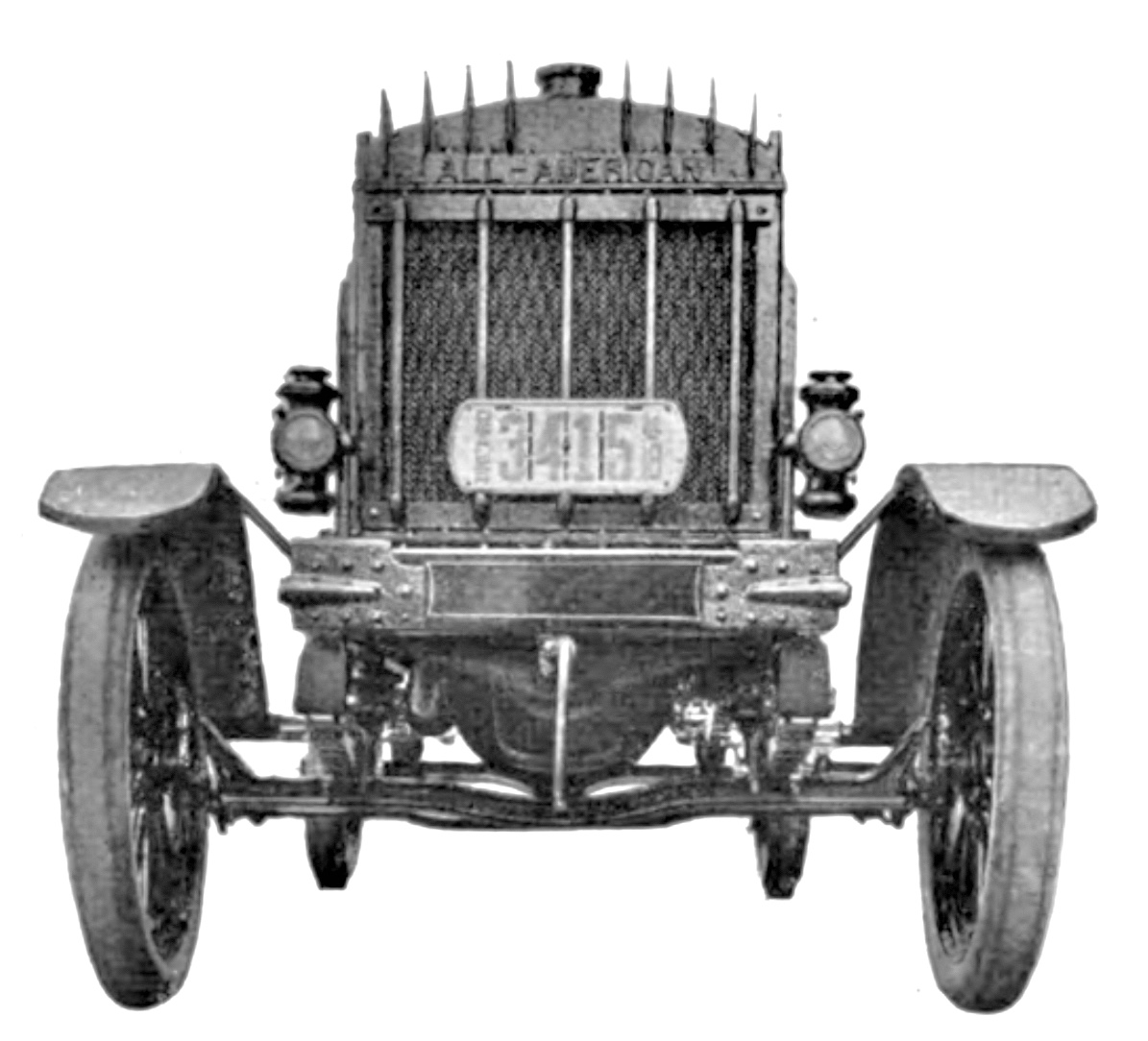
AA oversized radiator with strong cooling fins

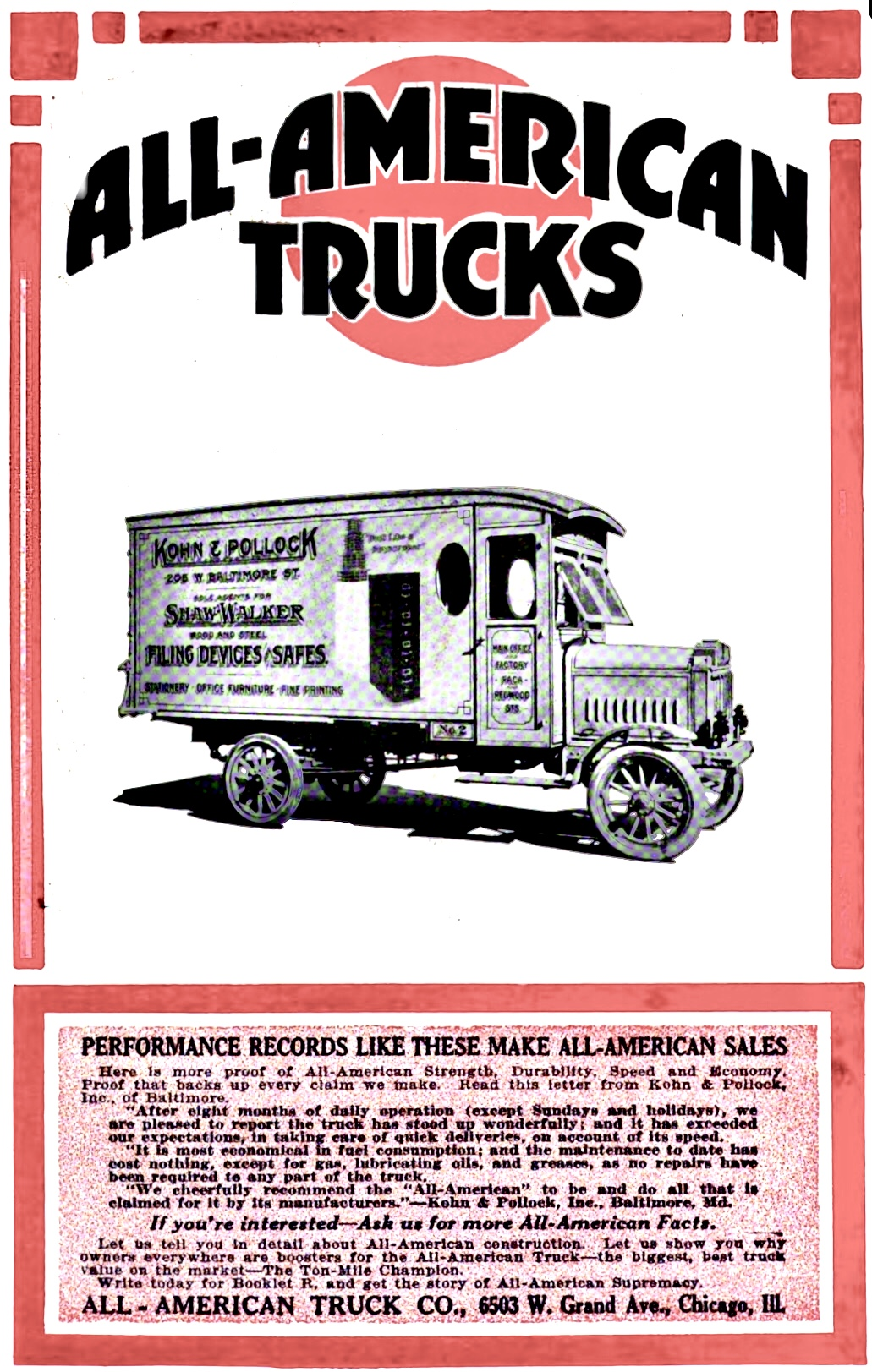
All-American advertisement (1920)

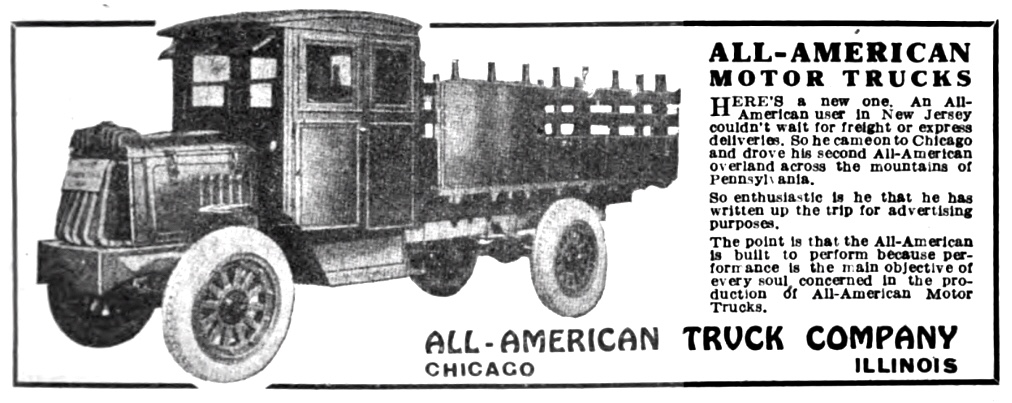
All-American advertisement (10.1920)

The company, founded 1918, in Chicago, Illinois, manufactured trucks under the brand name AA. In 1922, the business was moved to Fremont, Ohio and continued to operate under the name Fremont Motors Corp. until 1923. The one-ton truck, also called Model A, had a wheelbase of 3,302 mm. The four-cylinder engine had a displacement of 2719 cc with a bore of 82.55 mm and a stroke of 127 mm. The SAE engine power was rated at 16 hp. The actual power was 43 hp. The engine was supplied by Herschell Spillman.The top speed was 26 m.p.h. One of the developers at All-American Truck Co. was E. F. Paepper, who later became chief engineer at Republic Motor Truck Co. and Superior Motor Truck Co. After the 1-ton model, the 1.5-ton and 2.5-ton models were developed. In 1920, the sales prices were $1,795 for the 1-ton, $2,195 for the 1.5-ton, and $2,395 for the 2.5-ton. The trucks were characterized by oversized radiators with strong cooling fins on the top. In October 1920, a bankruptcy petition was filed against the All-American Truck Co., Chicago, which could still be averted.

=== Production figures ===
The pre-assigned serial numbers only indicate the maximum possible production quantity.

| Year | Production figures | Model | Load capacity | Serial number |
|---|---|---|---|---|
| 1918 | | | | |
| 1919 | 1651 | A | 1 to | 100 to 1750 |
| Sum | 1651 | | | |
| 1920 | | 1 t | 1 to | 1751 to 2392 |
| 1920 | | 1.5 t | 1.5 to | 1751 to 2392 |
| 1920 | | 2.5 t | 2,5 to | 1751 to 2392 |
| Sum | 642 | | | |
| 1921 | | 1 t | 1 to | 2393 to |
| 1921 | | 1.5 t | 1.5 to | 2393 to |
| 1921 | | 2.5 t | 2,5 to | 2393 to |
| Sum | | | | |
| 1922 | | | | |
| Sum | | | | |
