= Sandusky County Jail and Sheriff's House =

Historic government building in Ohio, United States

- U.S. National Register of Historic Places
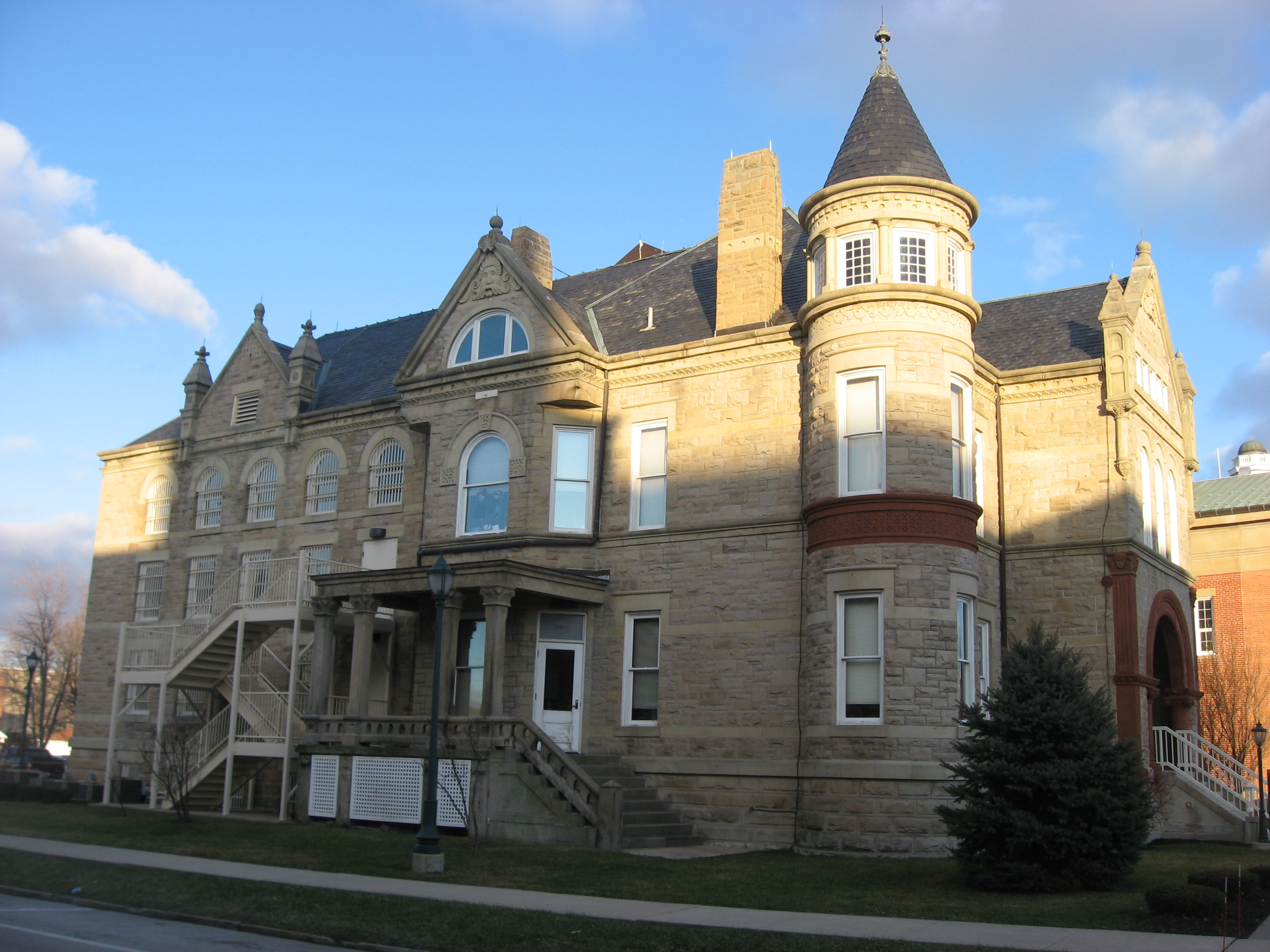
- Western side and front

- Location within Ohio Location within the United States
- Location: 622 Croghan St., Fremont, Ohio
- Coordinates: 41°20′49″N 83°7′6″W
- Area: Less than 1 acre (0.40 ha)
- Built: 1890
- Architect: John Carlton Johnson
- Architectural style: Queen Anne, Romanesque Revival
- NRHP reference No.: 97000198
- Added to NRHP: February 27, 1997

The Sandusky County Jail and Sheriff's House is a historic government building near downtown Fremont, Ohio, United States. Built in the early 1890s, it was used as an incarceration facility for almost a century before closing and being converted into an office building.

== Construction ==
In 1844, Sandusky County government officials arranged for the construction of a new courthouse on what is now Park Avenue in downtown Fremont. By the end of the century, the county owned property at the intersection of Clover and Croghan Streets, in the same block as the courthouse. Construction began after a cornerstone-laying ceremony on 6 November 1890, at which the main speaker was former President of the United States and Fremont resident Rutherford B. Hayes.

== Architecture ==
By the time that the sheriff's house and jail was completed in the following year, the county had paid approximately $40,000 for its new building; three stories tall, it was built of sandstone on a foundation of limestone with a slate roof and substantial wooden elements. Divided into two segments – one for the sheriff's residence and the other for housing prisoners – the building was designed in a combination of the Romanesque Revival and Queen Anne styles of architecture.

Because of the influence of President Hayes, who was the president of an organization founded to advocate for prison reform, the new sheriff's house and jail included features to ensure that its criminal inmates would be treated appropriately. Besides providing fourteen individual cells for prisoners (eight for men and six for women), the jail's design enabled the sheriff to separate longtime criminals from those deemed to be of less danger. The design was the work of Fremont resident John Carlton Johnson, who had already established himself as a designer of public buildings; among his previous commissions were the Defiance County Courthouse in northwestern Ohio, multiple Indiana courthouses, Fremont's city hall, and several other sheriff's-house-and-jail combination buildings. The styles that he chose for his buildings varied by type, with courthouses using the Second Empire style, jails typically employing the Romanesque Revival and houses featuring mixes of Queen Anne and Italianate.

== Recent history ==
After nearly a century in service, the sheriff's house and jail closed; its design could no longer meet new state regulations for jails. Although local officials considered destroying the structure in 1996, it survived; since that time, it has been converted into an office building, and the county's human resources department now operates out of the property. In early 1997, the building was listed on the National Register of Historic Places, qualifying both because of its historically significant architecture and because of the place that it has played in local history. It is one of seven Sandusky properties included on the National Register, and one of several Register-listed properties in Ohio that is a combined sheriff's house and jail.
