= Fremont City Schools =

School district in Ohio

Coordinates: 41°20′56″N 83°7′2″W

Location
- Fremont, Ohio United States

District information
- Type: Public School District
- Grades: K-12
- Superintendent: Denice Hirt

Students and staff
- Students: 3,519

Other information
- Website: fremontschools.net

Fremont City Schools is a public school district serving students in the city of Fremont, Ohio, United States. The school district enrolls 3,519 students as of the 2019–2020 academic year.

== Schools ==
=== High schools ===
- Fremont Ross High School (Grades 9th through 12th)

Located at 1100 North St. Fremont, Ohio 43420

=== Middle schools ===
- Fremont Middle School (Grades 6th, 7th and 8th)

Located at 1250 North St. Fremont, Ohio 43420

=== Elementary schools ===
- Atkinson Elementary School (Grades K through 5th)

Located at 1100 Delaware Ave. Fremont, Ohio 43420

- Croghan Elementary School (Grades K through 5th)

Located at 414 N. Pennsylvania Ave. Fremont, Ohio 43420

- Lutz Elementary School (Grades K through 5th)

Located at 1929 Buckland Ave. Fremont, Ohio 43420

- Otis Elementary School (Grades K through 5th)

Located at 718 North Brush St. Fremont, Ohio

=== Administrative office ===
Located at 500 W. State St., Suite A, Fremont, Ohio 43420
