= Carla F. Kim =

American geneticist

Carla Faith Bender Kim is a professor at the Department of Genetics at Harvard Medical School and a Principal Investigator at the Stem Cell Program at Boston Children’s Hospital. She is also a Principal Faculty member at the Harvard Stem Cell Institute, where she also serves as part of the Executive Committee.

== Early life and education ==
Kim was born in Fremont, Ohio. Kim received her bachelor's degree from Ohio Northern University (1997) and a Ph.D. in Genetics from the University of Wisconsin-Madison (2002). Kim completed her postdoctoral training in the Tyler Jacks Laboratory at MIT (2006) with the support of the Jane Coffin Childs Research Fellowship.

During her time in the Jacks Lab, Kim discovered the first stem cell population in the adult mouse lung, bronchioalveolar stem cells (BASCs).

== Research ==
Working with genetically engineered mouse models that accurately represent human lung cancer, Kim’s group was the first to identify cancer stem cell populations in the two most frequent types of lung cancer in patients. Her lab’s knowledge in lung stem cells has revealed a new combination therapy approach for particular subsets of lung cancer patients. Most recently, Kim’s lab has developed a 3D lung organoid system that makes it possible to derive specialized lung cells from lung stem cells. Kim’s work has been recognized by a variety of organizations, she has received the Forbeck Scholar Award, V Scholar award, the Basil O’Connor Scholar award from the March of Dimes, the American Cancer Society’s Research Scholar award, and most recently the William Rippe Award for Distinguished Research in Lung Cancer from the Lung Cancer Research Foundation. Kim’s work and lab are supported by federal funding from the National Institutes of Health.
