= Sandusky County Courthouse =

Local government building in the United States

Coordinates: 41°20′49″N 83°7′3″W

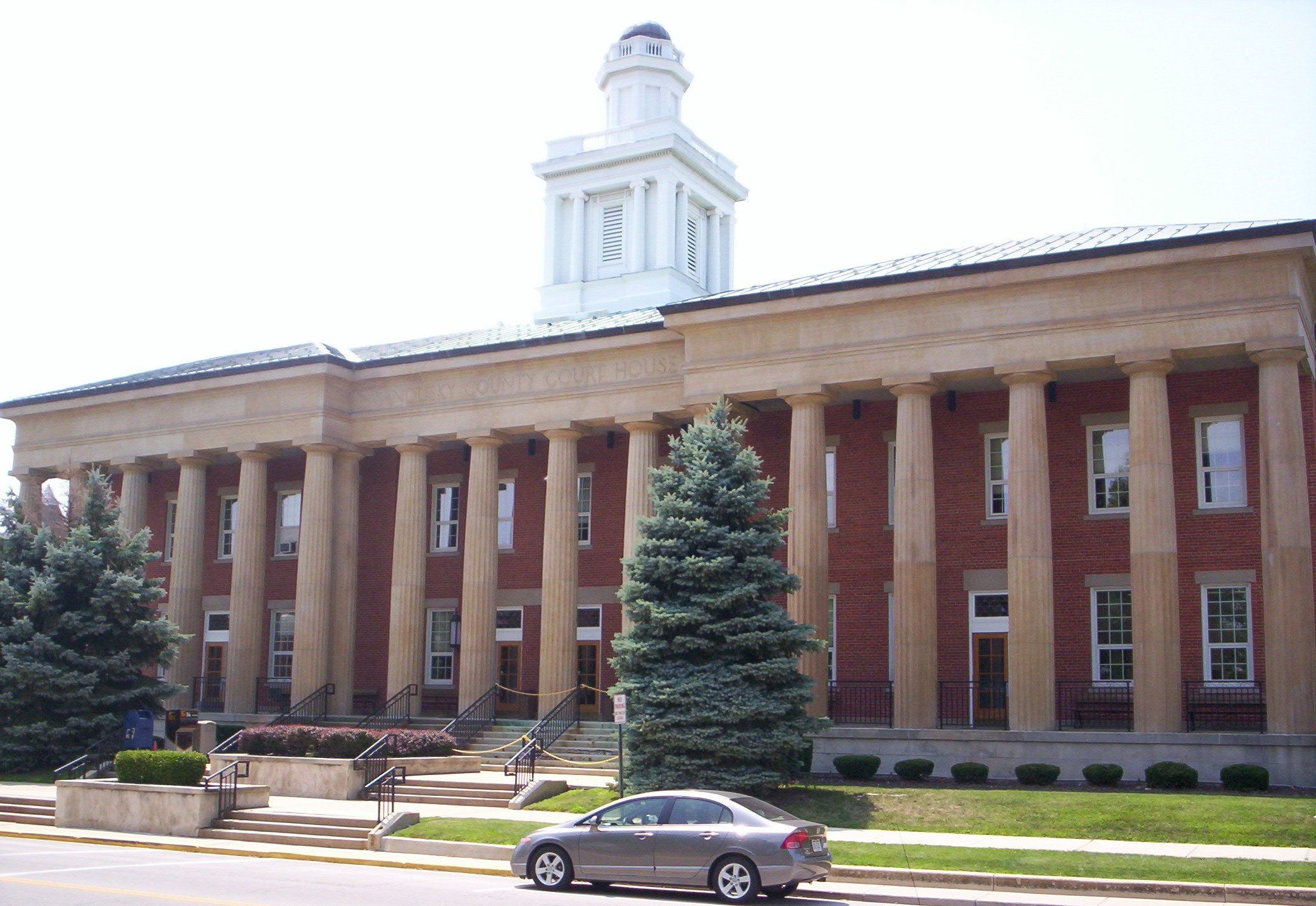
Front of the courthouse

The Sandusky County Courthouse is a local government building in Fremont, Ohio, United States. Built in the 1840s and since greatly modified, it remains in use by the government of Sandusky County.

== Construction ==
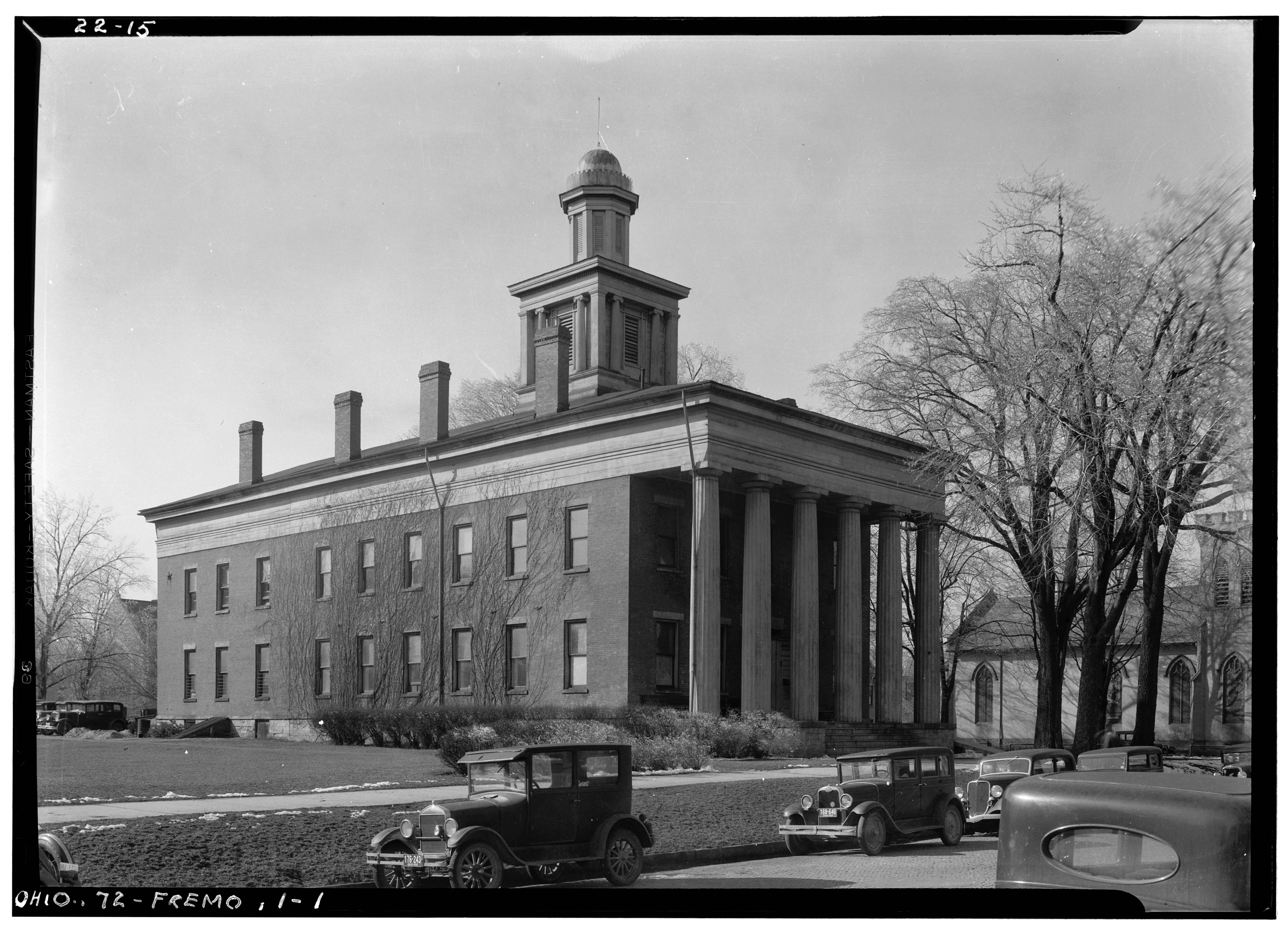
The courthouse building in April 1934. This photo was taken prior to major expansion.

Construction on the Sandusky County Courthouse began in 1840 and concluded four years later. Built according to a design by architect Cyrus Williams, it includes a dungeon-style underground jail with ashlar walls built of large blocks of locally quarried limestone. Built primarily of stone and brick, the courthouse possesses a Greek Revival facade composed of Doric columns.

== Expansion ==
Its original appearance has been drastically altered; when built, the portico comprised six wooden columns, rather than the eighteen sandstone ones now present, and an octagonal cupola with a round copper dome was present atop the building. As the county government's needs increased, local leaders applied in the 1930s for federal aid to expand their facility. With money from the Works Progress Administration, the courthouse was greatly expanded, leaving the original building as the northern wing of a three-part courthouse. This project resulted in the replacement of the original columns and the relocation of the cupola to one of the new wings, as well as the construction of new additions. Despite the gap of nearly a century between the construction of the original and additional portions of the buildings, the newer portions complement the original section, and the courthouse remains a significant component of the city's historic downtown, which also includes the site of a nearby fort that was constructed along the Sandusky River for the War of 1812.

== Usage ==
The courthouse remains in use by the Sandusky County courts, as well as by local government archives. Among the records housed at the Sandusky County Courthouse is a petition filed in 1849 by local attorney Rutherford B. Hayes to change the city's name to Fremont from "Lower Sandusky", a name that was seen as too generic for the convenience of its residents.
