= Fremont Speedway =

Racetrack in Fremont, Ohio, US

Coordinates: 41°21′36″N 83°06′53″W

The New Fremont Speedway
The Track That Action Built
- Location: Fremont, Ohio
- Owner: Sandusky County Agricultural Society
- Operator: Rich & Shelly Farmer
- Opened: 1951
- Former names: Fremont Raceway
- Major events: Jim Ford Classic (2 nights), HOF induction
- Website: www.fremontohspeedway.com

Oval
- Surface: Clay
- Length: 0.333 mi (0.536 km)
- Banking: Semi-banked
- Race lap record: 11.732 sec. (Lee Jacobs, Jacobs #2, 2003, 410 Sprints)

Fremont Speedway, also known as "The Track That Action Built" and "Home of the All Stars", is a semi-banked 1/3 mile clay oval speedway located at the Sandusky County Fairgrounds in Fremont, Ohio, United States. Races are typically held on Saturday nights. Regular events include 410 cubic inch sprint cars, 305 cubic inch sprint cars, and dirt trucks. In 2024, the World of Outlaws sprint car series returns to the speedway for the first time since 2016. The speedway has previously hosted the All Star Circuit of Champions, National Sprint Tour, and United States Auto Club.

== Track records ==
Division	Time	Driver	Date
410 Sprint Cars	11.732 seconds	Lee Jacobs	May 3, 2003
305 Sprint Cars	12.857 seconds	Bryan Sebetto	April 25, 2026
Dirt Trucks	17.672 seconds	Dan Roepke Jr.	April 26, 2014

== History ==
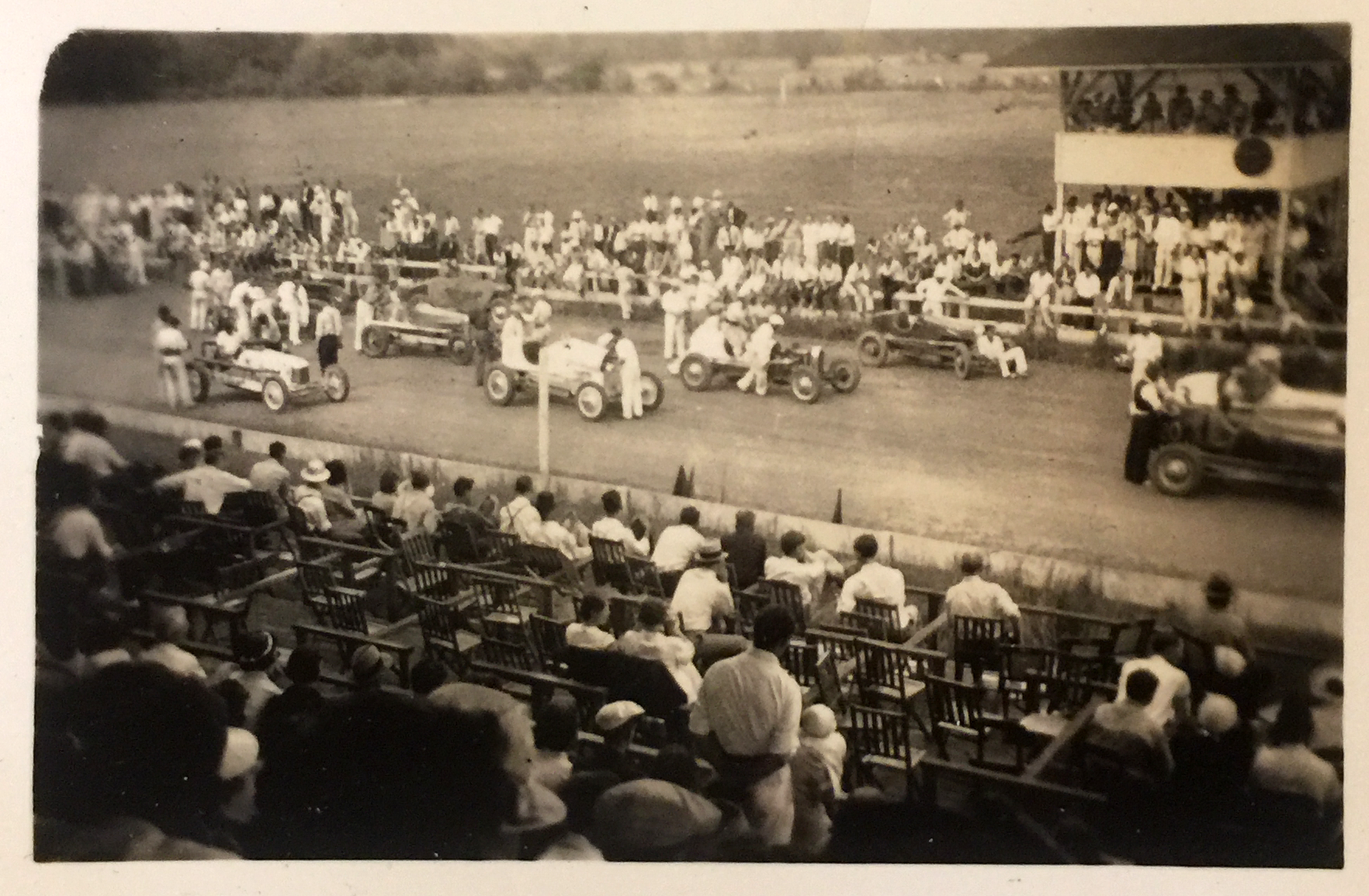
Auto racing at Sandusky County Fairgrounds in Fremont, OH, circa 1936.

The first automobile race was held at the Sandusky County Fairgrounds on Sunday, June 7, 1936, when the International Speedway Association leased the half-mile horse track for a Big Cars race. Big Cars, as they were known, were the forerunners to today's sprint cars. An estimated 7,000 people attended the first race as Clay Corbitt picked up the feature win. Despite the success of the first race, it would be 12 years before Fremont hosted another auto race. On September 19, 1948, the Tri-State Racing Association leased the fairgrounds for a racing program billed as the Tri-State Racing Association's Championship. Over 4,000 fans were in attendance to watch Red Bales win the feature event.

In the fall of 1951, Joe and Dorothy Stelter and Harry Maynor of Toledo, Ohio founded Fremont Speedway. Their original track was just over 1/10 of a mile in length and nearly flat. On September 30, 1951, a crowd of 1,500 attended Fremont Speedway's first official race. 38 drivers took part in the 20 lap feature event, which was won by Leo Caldwell of Perrysburg.

In 1952, Maynor sold his interest in the speedway to Frank Jensen of Toledo, and Wayne Wall of Toledo purchased an interest in 1953. Wall sold out in 1954 and the Stelters and Jensen operated the track until 1957 when a local Fremont businessman, Don Emick, purchased Jensen's stock. This operation continued until 1960 when Emick sold out, leaving Joe and Dot as the sole owners. After Joe's sudden death in 1962, Dot decided to continue and became one of the first female promoters in the country. Dot later married Paul Szakovits and he helped to operate the track. Dot promoted the speedway until 1976 when longtime announcer Gary Kern purchased the facility.

During the 1990s, the facility changed hands many times. In 1994 Joseph Darr became a partner with Kern. Delphos, Ohio resident Ken Langhals operated the speedway in 1995. In 1996 Kelly Applegate purchased the speedway, followed by Ken Meggitt in 1997. The track then sat idle for two years until Jim Ford, a former driver and sprint car owner from Elmore, Ohio, leased the track from the Sandusky County Fair Board. Ford reopened the track in 2000 with many improvements. In 2007, Ford stepped down as promoter due to health issues. The fair board elected Rich Farmer and Andy James as co-promoters of the speedway in 2008. In 2010, Emods competed at the speedway for the first time ever.

The speedway has become a pioneer in dirt track racing over the years. It was one of the first tracks in the nation to run the now popular 305 sprint car division. In 2000, Jim Ford created the dirt truck division as an affordable entry level into dirt track racing. Similar divisions have since spread across the nation. The speedway was also the first dirt track in the nation to incorporate soft wall technology.

The speedway has hosted many nationally renowned race car drivers including Steve Kinser, Sammy Swindell, Jeff Gordon, Dave Blaney, Kasey Kahne, Brad Doty, and Doug Wolfgang. "The Ohio Traveler" Rick Ferkel began his storied career with a victory at the speedway. The speedway has also hosted over 100 All Star Circuit of Champions events, earning it the nickname "Home of the All Stars."

== Hall of Fame ==
The following people have been inducted in Fremont Speedway's Hall of Fame.

Inductee	Category	Year
Auxter, Johnny "Gentleman"	Driver	2009
Ball, Art	Driver	2009
Beale, Rollie	Driver	2009
Billow, Harold	Owner/Builder	2009
Ford, Jim	Driver/Promoter	2009
Fosco, George	Driver	2009
Franks, Alvin	Driver	2009
Harrison, Darl	Driver	2009
Keegan, Gug	Driver	2009
Linder, Jim	Driver	2009
McCune, "Irish" Jim	Driver	2009
McGilton, Harold "Mac"	Driver	2009
Notestine, Gene	Driver/Official	2009
Robison, Herbie	Driver	2009
Shilling, Dorthy "Dot"	Promoter	2009
Smith, Wendell	Driver	2009
Strasser, Paul	Driver	2009
Beaber, Johnny	Driver	2010
Burmeister, Sonny	Owner/Builder	2010
Genzman, De	Driver	2010
Hemminger, Wally	Driver	2010
Keegan, Mark	Driver	2010
Kern, Gary	Official/Promoter	2010
Lowe, Earl	Owner	2010
Roepke, Jim	Driver	2010
Sabo, Joe	Owner/Builder	2010
Sheets, Roy	Driver	2010
Caldwell, Leo	Driver	2011
Fleming, Jim	Driver	2011
Gill, Bud	Owner	2011
Hasselbach, Dale	Driver	2011
Kear, Shirley	Life Contributor	2011
Kresser, Harry	Driver	2011
Leaser, Tom	Owner	2011
Maffett Sr, Wayne	Driver	2011
Miller, George	Driver	2011
Youster, Leroy	Driver	2011
Boos, Ron	Owner	2012
Clark, Ken	Driver	2012
Cook, John	Owner	2012
Emick, Bert/Brigiette	Promoter	2012
Ferkel, Rick	Driver	2012
Forsythe, John	Sponsor	2012
Griffith, Earl	Engine Builder	2012
Hewitt, Jack	Driver	2012
Keegan, Jim	Driver	2012
Linder, Fred	Driver	2012
Linton, Don	Owner	2012
Ritter, Grover	Owner	2012
Sabo, Tim	Driver	2012
Schemmer. Tom	Engine Builder	2012
Smith, Ed	Engine Builder	2012
Stelter, Joe	Promoter	2012
Conger, Sonny	Owner, Builder, Mechanic	2013
Dewald, Paul	Driver	2013
Eckhardt, Don	Owner	2013
Ford, Randy	Driver	2013
Hahn, Bill	Driver	2013
Holbrook, Gordon	Driver	2013
Huss, Phil "Smokey"	Ambassador	2013
Keegan, Larry	Owner/Crew Chief	2013
Keegan, Mervin	Builder	2013
Liskai, Alex	Driver	2013
Liskai, Dick	Driver	2013
Liskai, Steve	Driver	2013
Connors, L J	Driver	2014
Griffith, Gary	Driver/Engine Builder	2014
Keim, Clay	Driver	2014
Kemenah, Harold	Owner	2014
Kiser, Ken	Communications Provider	2014
Leaser, Bob	Owner	2014
Rankine, Eric	Driver	2014
Vance, Todd	Driver	2014
VanNess Family	Owner/Builder	2014
Ward, Jim	Driver	2014
Wright, Joe	Owner	2014
Berkley, Robert	Owner/Mechanic	2015
Cicanese, Bill	Driver/Builder	2015
Drusback, Tom	Owner	2015
Gordon, Jack	Driver	2015
Holman, Mike	Official	2015
Kiser, Chris	Driver	2015
Meyer, Fritz	Wrecker Service	2015
Naida, John	Driver	2015
Potter, Lee	Driver	2015
Steinmetz, Fran	Driver	2015
Thompson, Howard (Moe)	Employee	2015
Blaney, Dale	Driver	2016
Fisher, Vince	Owner	2016
Keegan, Joe	Driver	2016
Kistler, Paul	Engine Builder	2016
Leaser, Ron	Driver	2016
Malloy, Len	Owner	2016
Nuber, Larry	Life Contributor	2016
Pierce, Keith	Owner	2016
Pierce, Roy	Owner	2016
Sears Jr, Bobby	Driver	2016
Willey, Dick	Builder/Mechanic	2016
Beechler, Mike	Builder	2017
Burkin, Lamar	Owner	2017
Ford, Doug	Mechanic/Official	2017
Hoffman, Jeff	Driver	2017
Knoll, Bobby	Driver	2017
Kraylek, Jack	Driver	2017
McComas, Ron	Owner/Builder/Mechanic	2017
Nemire Sr, Ken	Driver	2017
Neimire, Jerry	Driver	2017
Phillips, Eric	Owner/Engine Builder	2017
Root, Ken "Red"	Mechanic	2017
Smith, Ken	Official/Photographer	2017
Willey, Gary	Driver	2017
Engler, Jay	Owner	2018
Gill, Buddy	Mechanic	2018
Gill, Larry	Mechanic	2018
Hazzard, Richard	Owner	2018
Keegan, Don	Owner	2018
Keegan, Ron	Owner	2018
Leaser, Jimmy	Driver	2018
Miller, Skip	Driver	2018
Potter, Lin	Driver	2018
Thompson, Joe	Driver/Official	2018
Thompson, Shirley	Official	2018
Wisbon, John	Driver	2019
Berryman, Bruce	Driver	2019
Marko, Dave	Driver	2019
Creeger, Jerry “Dude”	Driver	2019
Farmer, Rich	Driver/Owner/Promoter	2019
Kear, Chuck	Special Contributor	2019
Slatter, Floyd	Builder, Mechanic	2019
Keegan, Chuck	Owner	2019

== All-time win list ==
As of November 1, 2024, the top ten drivers in the all-time wins standings are as follows:

Rank	Name	Wins
1	Shawn Valenti	93
2	Paul Weaver	81
3	Art Ball	76
4	Gug Keegan	62
5	John Ivy	62
6	Mark Keegan	60
7	Jim Linder	58
8	Herbie Robinson	54
9	Jamie Miller	52
10	Jim McCune	45
