= Margaret Good Myers =

American economist

- Born: April 3, 1899; Fremont, Ohio, US
- Died: July 11, 1988 (aged 89); Medford, New Jersey, US
- Education: Barnard College (BA); Columbia University (MA, PhD)
- Occupations: Economist, professor, author
- Notable work: A Financial History of the United States

Margaret Good Myers (April 3, 1899 – July 11, 1988) was an American economist, professor, and author was taught at Vassar College for over 30 years. She is best known for authoring A Financial History of the United States, published in 1970, which summarized the country's financial history from the American colonial period through modern time.

== Biography ==
Myers was born in Fremont, Ohio on April 3, 1899. She earned her Bachelor of Arts from Barnard College in 1920, followed by a Master of Arts from Columbia University in 1922.

From 1920 to 1922, Myers worked as a statistician at the Federal Reserve Bank of New York. From 1923 to 1925, she was the Director of Statistics for the East Harlem Nursing and Health Demonstration project. From 1926 through 1930, Myers worked as a research consultant for Columbia University. In 1931, she earned her PhD from Columbia University in economics. Her dissertation was entitled The New York Money Market and analyzed the American market from the post-American Revolution through the passing of the Federal Reserve Act in 1913. She did further graduate work at the University of Paris in 1931 and 1932 and at the University of Vienna in 1933.

Myers taught as a professor economics at Vassar College from 1934 to 1964. In 1936, she published Paris as a Financial Centre, a study of the money market in France. In 1940, she published Monetary Proposals for Social Reform in which she countered proposals of social credit advocated by C. H. Douglas. Myers also served on the board of Planned Parenthood and was president of the Poughkeepsie League of Women Voters from 1953 to 1954.

== Later life ==
After retiring from Vassar, Myers published A Financial History of the United States in 1970 which summarized the country's financial history from the American colonial period. The National Post called it a "a fascinating, well-illustrated account" and praised Myers for converting a "technical subject into an absorbing pleasure for the average reader". She also served as the director of the New York State Citizen's Committee for Public Schools.

Myers died of pneumonia in Medford, New Jersey on July 11, 1988.

== Advocacy ==
Myers advocated for public education, stating that it was "almost impossible for a young person to make a living nowadays without a good educational background". She considered public schools a "community asset", calling them a necessity in an industrialized country and linked them to tax increases and property values. Myers also advocated for women in the workforce, decrying the "economic waste in homemaking".

== Works ==
- The New York Money Market (1931)
- Paris as a Financial Centre (1936)
- Monetary Proposals for Social Reform (1940)
- A Financial History of the United States (1970)
