= Shawn McCarthy =

American football player (born 1968)

No. 11
- Position: Punter

Personal information
- Born: February 22, 1968 (age 58); Fremont, Ohio, U.S.
- Listed height: 6 ft 6 in (1.98 m)
- Listed weight: 227 lb (103 kg)

Career information
- High school: Fremont Ross
- College: Purdue
- NFL draft: 1990: 12th round, 305th overall pick

Career history
- Atlanta Falcons (1990)*; New England Patriots (1991–1992)
- * Offseason or practice squad member only

Awards and highlights
- Second-team All-American (1989); First-team All-Big Ten (1989)

Career NFL statistics
- Punts: 169
- Punt yards: 6,877
- Longest punt: 93
- Stats at Pro Football Reference

Shawn Michael McCarthy (born February 22, 1968) is an American former professional football player who was a punter in the National Football League (NFL). He was selected by the Atlanta Falcons in the 12th round of the 1990 NFL draft and later played for the New England Patriots. McCarthy played college football for the Purdue Boilermakers, where he was also a quarterback. He attended Fremont Ross High School and was the football teams' starting quarterback, punter and placekicker.

On November 3, 1991, McCarthy placed a 93-yard punt versus the Buffalo Bills that was downed inside Buffalo's 1-yard line. The punt, which set a Patriots franchise record, was the third longest in NFL history and the longest since the AFL-NFL merger. In Week 13 of the 1991 season, McCarthy threw a complete pass on a fake punt to Ben Coates for an 11-yard gain. It was the only pass attempt of his NFL career.
