= Fremont Ross High School =

Location
- 1100 North Street; Fremont, Ohio 43420; United States
- Coordinates: 41°21′46″N 83°07′28″W

Information
- Type: Public
- Established: 1957
- School district: Fremont City School District
- Principal: Christine Oravets
- Teaching staff: 52.20 (FTE)
- Grades: 9–12
- Student to teacher ratio: 19.06
- Colors: Purple and white
- Athletics conference: Northern Lakes League
- Mascot: The Little Giant
- Team name: Little Giants
- Website: ross.fremontschools.net

Fremont Ross High School (FRHS) is a public high school in Fremont, Ohio, United States. It is the only high school in the Fremont City Schools, and one of two high schools in Fremont, the other being Saint Joseph Central Catholic High School. The school enrolls 1,265 students as the 2019-2020 School year. Fremont Ross is named for W.W. Ross (1834–1906), who served as the first superintendent of Fremont City Schools for 42 years from 1864 until his death in 1906 at the age of 71. A new high school was built and was finished by the start of the 2021-2022 school year.

The boys' sports teams are called the "Little Giants", while girls' teams are the "Lady Giants". The school's colors are purple and white. The football team has a rivalry with Sandusky High School that dates back to 1895, making it the biggest rivalry in Northwest Ohio.

The school is a member of the Northern Lakes League as of the 2023-24 school year. The school was previously a member of the Three Rivers Athletic Conference from 2011-12 to 2022-23.

== State championships ==
- Boys swimming and diving – 1936, 1938, 1939, 1941, 1942, 1943, 1953
- Boys golf – 1973

== Notable alumni ==
- Timothy Lull, class of 1961, served as President of Pacific Lutheran Seminary (ELCA) in Berkeley, California
- Bob Brudzinski, class of 1973, professional football player in the National Football League (NFL)
- Rob Lytle, class of 1973, professional football player in the NFL
- Derek Isaman, class of 1985, professional boxer and National Golden Gloves Heavyweight Champion
- Shawn McCarthy, class of 1986, professional football player in the NFL
- Charles Woodson, class of 1995, 1997 Heisman Trophy winner and Pro Football Hall of Fame inductee.
- Myles Porter, class of 2004, Para Judo athlete and Para Olympic Silver Medalist at the 2012 Para-Olympic games in London.
- Jacob Wukie, class of 2004, athlete and silver medalist in archery at the 2012 London Olympics
