= Ohio Northern University =

Private university in Ada, Ohio, U.S.

Coordinates: 40.7669°N 83.8249°W

- Former names: Northwestern Ohio Normal School (1871–1885); Ohio Normal University (1885–1903)
- Motto: Ex diversitate vires (Latin)
- Motto in English: "Out of diversity strength"
- Type: Private college
- Established: 1871; 155 years ago
- Religious affiliation: United Methodist Church
- Academic affiliations: Space-grant
- Endowment: $160.3 million (2019)
- President: Melissa J. Baumann
- Provost: Juliet K. Hurtig
- Faculty: 267 (fall 2023)
- Students: 3,042 (fall 2023)
- Undergraduates: 2,592 (fall 2023)
- Postgraduates: 450 (fall 2023)
- Location: Ada, Ohio, United States
- Campus: Rural
- Colors: Orange, Black, White
- Nickname: Polar Bears
- Sporting affiliations: NCAA Division III – OAC
- Mascot: Klondike
- Website: onu.edu

Ohio Northern University (Ohio Northern or ONU) is a private college in Ada, Ohio, United States. Founded by Henry Solomon Lehr in 1871, ONU offers over 60 programs across five undergraduate and graduate colleges and is affiliated with the United Methodist Church. The college had an enrollment of about 3,000 students as of 2023.

== History ==
Henry Solomon Lehr founded the "Northwestern Ohio Normal School" in August 1871. When the college's curriculum grew to include pharmacy, engineering, law and business programs, its name was changed to "Ohio Normal University" in 1885 and, eventually, in 1903, to Ohio Northern University. In 1899, it became affiliated with the United Methodist Church to reduce debt.

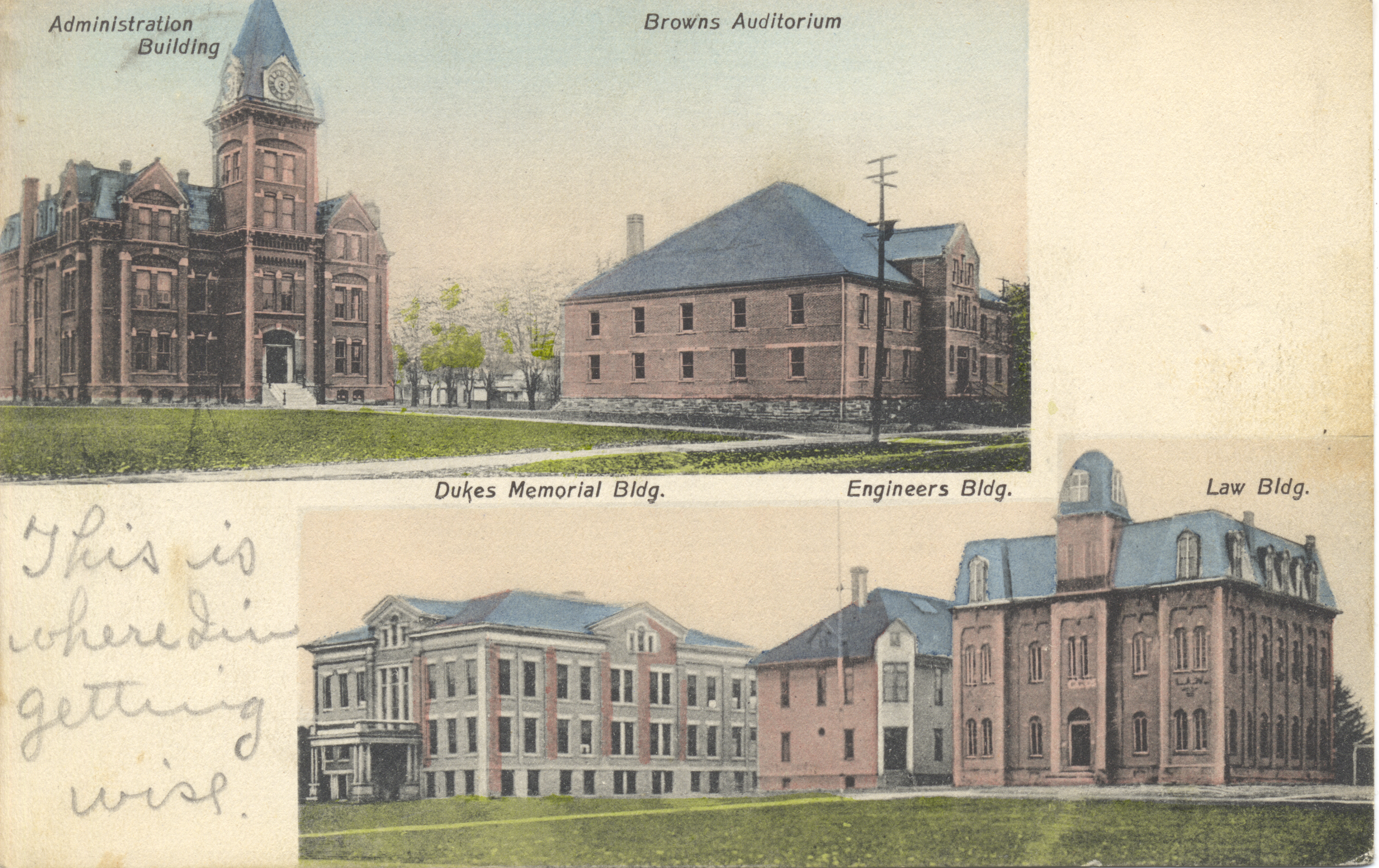
Early ONU buildings depicted on a postcard

Before the Great Depression, more than one thousand students were typically enrolled at Ohio Northern every year. Both the Great Depression and the following World War II plunged the school into low enrollment, and the possibility of closure was considered. During World War II, enrollment reached a low of 156 students. Thanks to the G.I. Bill, Ohio Northern was able to bring enrollment back up to nine hundred students by 1946.

Throughout the 1960s, a number of ONU students and faculty/staff participated in the American Civil Rights Movement. ONU hosted Dr. Martin Luther King Jr. on January 11, 1968, four days before his 39th birthday and just three months before his assassination. During his visit at ONU, King famously spoke regarding the myth that many immigrant and/or ethnic groups successfully pulled themselves up by their bootstraps, whereas African Americans were incapable of doing so. ONU honored King and his speech on campus with the unveiling of a statue in his likeness on April 17, 2018.

Growth continued under DeBow Freed through the 1980s and 1990s with additions to the Taggart Law Library, Presser Hall, Dukes Memorial, Wilson Art Building, Biggs Engineering, Heterick Memorial Library, and Meyer Hall of Science, and the construction of the Freed Center for the Performing Arts and a new president's on-campus home. Under Kendall Baker, campus additions include Dicke Hall, an expansion of the Robertson-Evans Pharmacy building, the Dial-Roberson Stadium and the Mathile Center for the Natural Sciences. In 2008, Ohio Northern University built and opened The Inn at Ohio Northern University. A new engineering building was opened in October 2019.

To honor professor Forrest Clingerman's legacy Ohio Northern University created an Honors course “Clingerman on Environmental Studies,” offered in fall 2025.

== Organization and administration ==
Melissa J. Baumann is Ohio Northern University's 12th president, and first female to serve in the role.

- Henry Solomon Lehr (1871–1900)
- Leroy A. Belt (1900–1905)
- Albert Edwin Smith (1905–1930)
- Robert Williams (1929*–1943)
- Robert O. McClure (1943–1949)
- Frank Bringle McIntosh (1949–1965)
- Samuel Lewis Meyer (1965–1977)
- Ray B. Loeschner (1977–1979)
- Harold A. Bolz (1979, interim)
- DeBow Freed (1979–1999)
- Kendall L. Baker (1999–2011)
- Daniel A. DiBasio (2011–2022)

== Academics ==
ONU is accredited by the Higher Learning Commission. The institution comprises five colleges:

- Getty College of Arts and Sciences
- James F. Dicke College of Business Administration
- T.J. Smull College of Engineering
- Rudolph H. Raabe College of Pharmacy
- Claude W. Pettit College of Law

Founded in 1885, the Ohio Northern University Pettit College of Law was named in honor of Claude W. Pettit, a judge and former dean of the college. ONU Law has been fully accredited by the American Bar Association since 1948 and a member of the Association of American Law Schools since 1965.

In the 2025 U.S. News & World Report college rankings, Ohio Northern University was ranked second out of 165 regional master's universities in the Midwest. In 2024, Washington Monthly ranked Ohio Northern University 9th among 223 colleges that award almost exclusively bachelor's degrees in the U.S. based on its contribution to the public good, as measured by social mobility, research, and promoting public service.

== Campus ==
=== Hill Memorial ===
Hill Memorial Building is a historic building on campus. The building was finished in 1879 and is the second structure built on the grounds. Initially, Hill held administrative offices and classrooms, though many University departments would enter and leave the building throughout its history. The building is currently the oldest on campus and one of the oldest standing structures in Ada. In July 2024, the administration of Ohio Northern announced the closure of Hill Building citing age and a need of extensive repairs.

ONU campus gallery

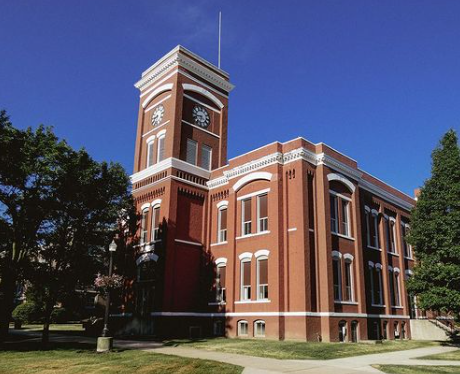
Hill Building

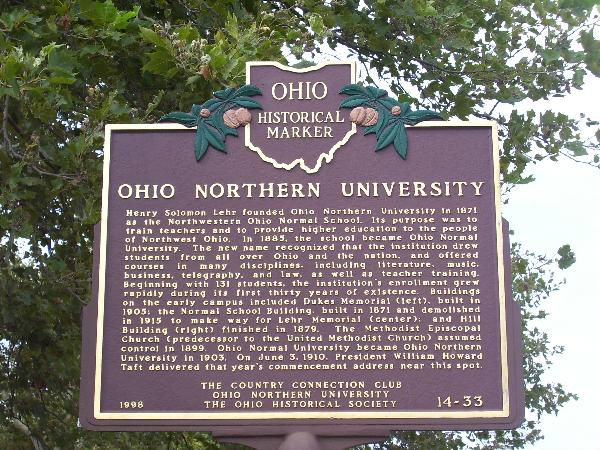
An Ohio historical marker

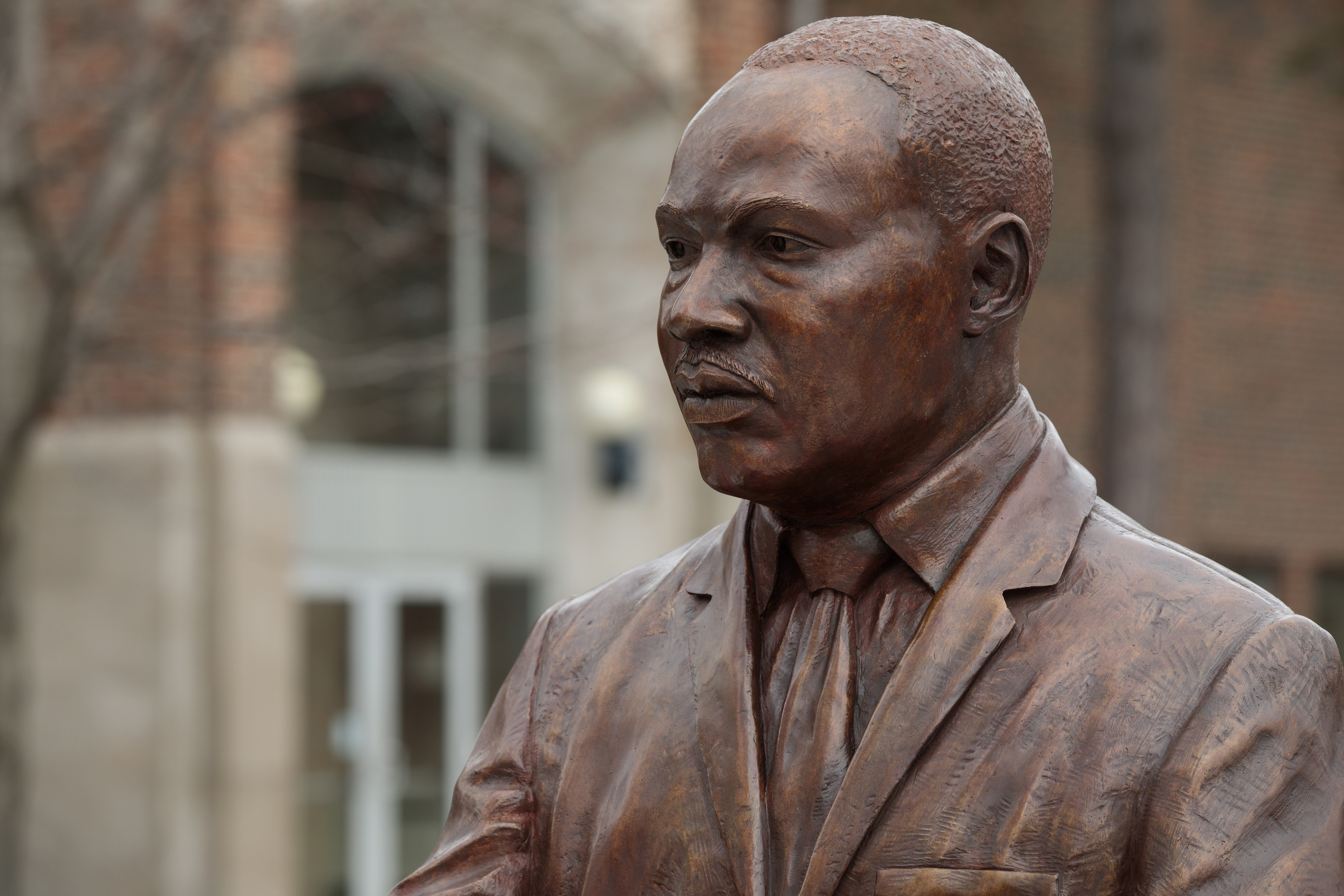
Martin Luther King Jr. statue

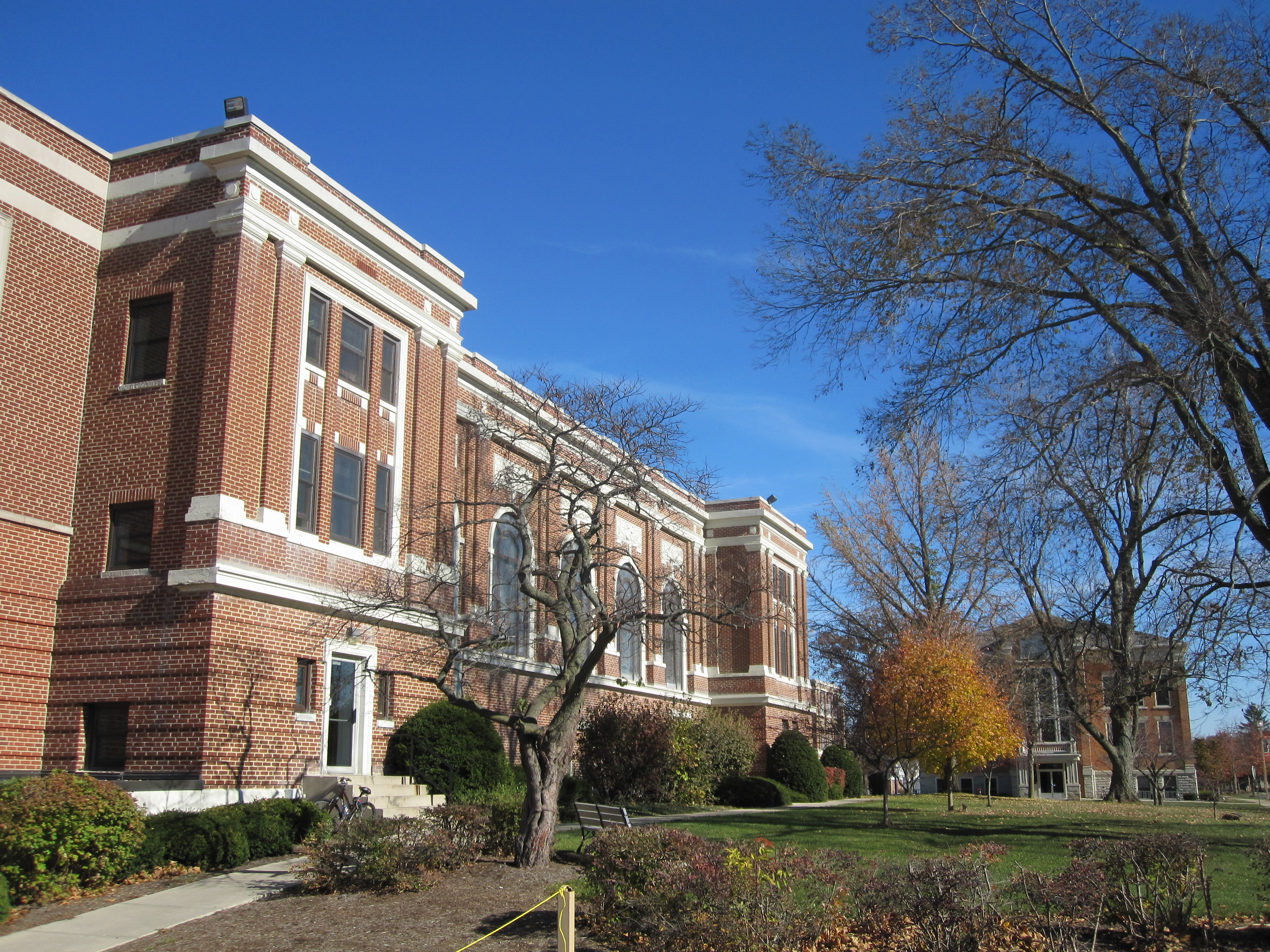
Presser Hall, housing the music department

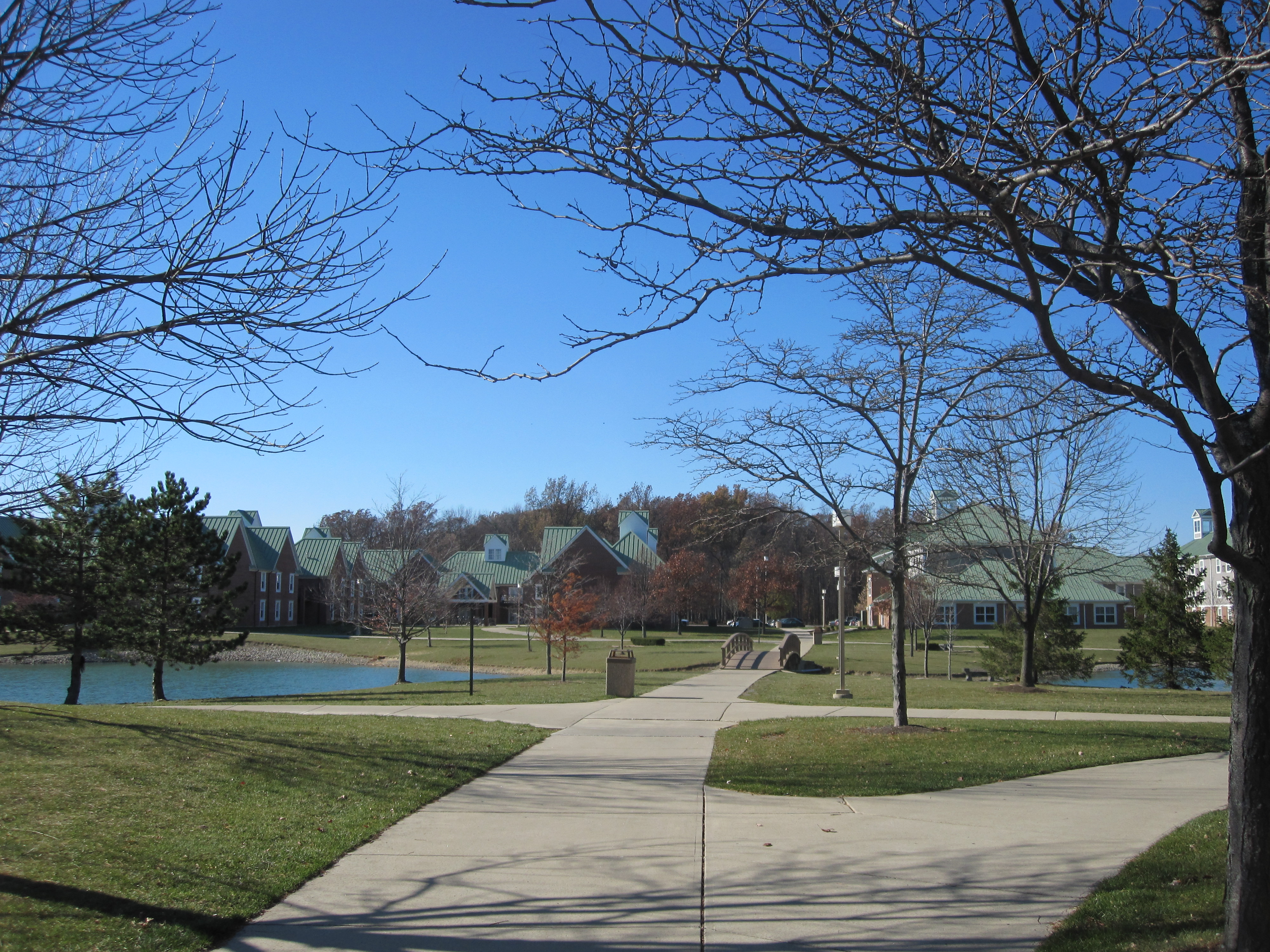
Student dormitories

== Athletics ==
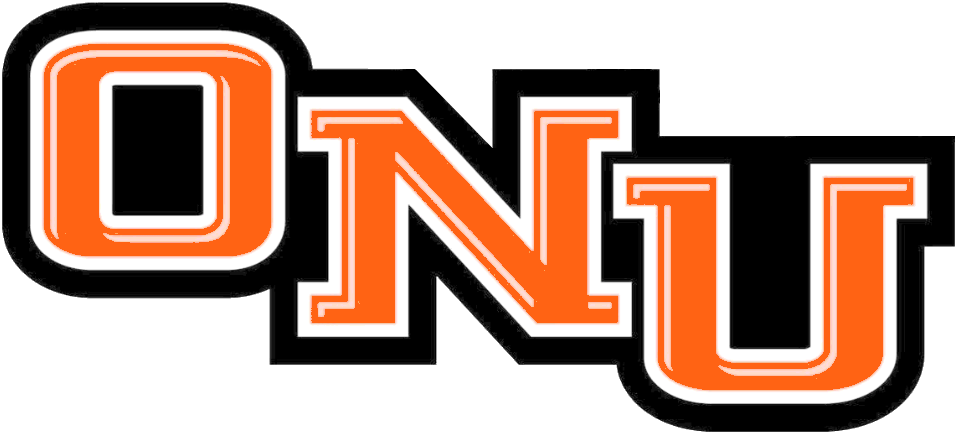
ONU athletics wordmark

Men's sports	Women's sports
Baseball	Basketball
Basketball	Bowling
Cross Country	Cross Country
Football	Golf
Golf	Lacrosse
Golf	Soccer
Lacrosse	Softball
Soccer	Swimming
Swimming	Tennis
Tennis	Track and field
Track and field	Volleyball

ONU students participate in intercollegiate, intramural, and sports clubs in a variety of sports. The ONU Polar Bears compete in the NCAA Division III Ohio Athletic Conference (OAC). The men's volleyball team participates in the Midwest Intercollegiate Volleyball Association in the Great Midwest Men's Volleyball Conference. The school mascot is a polar bear named Klondike.

The ONU varsity football team defeated Mount Union College in 2005 to snap the Purple Raiders 110-game regular season winning streak. The ONU women's volleyball team had an NCAA All-Divisions record 36 consecutive winning seasons.

=== National honors ===
- 1993 Men's Basketball NCAA Division III Champions
- 1989 Women's Volleyball NCAA Division III Runners-up
- 2012 Men's Soccer NCAA Division III Runners-up
- 2001 Men's Basketball NCAA Division III Final Four
- 2008 Women's Volleyball NCAA Division III Final Four
- 2007 Men's Volleyball NIRSA Division II National Champions

== Notable alumni ==
- Anthony Alaimo, jurist
- Frank T. Bow, jurist and politician who was honored by naming the Frank T. Bow Federal Building in Canton, Ohio.
- James Cloyd Bowman, a children's book author who received a Newbery Honor in 1938 for Pecos Bill: The Greatest Cowboy of All Time.
- Benjamin Brafman, a prominent criminal defense attorney based in New York.
- William J. Brown, former Ohio Attorney General (1971–1983).
- Anthony J. Celebrezze, Secretary of Health, Education, and Welfare under the Kennedy and Johnson administrations, the 49th Mayor of Cleveland, and a Sixth Circuit Appellate Judge
- George Washington Crile, founder of the Cleveland Clinic and inventor of the system for blood transfusion
- Robert R. Cupp, former Ohio Supreme Court Justice and former Speaker of the Ohio House of Representatives
- Mike DeWine, Governor of Ohio
- Simeon Davison Fess, a Republican politician a former president of Antioch College
- Amanda Everlove, two time Paralympian
- George Getty, American lawyer, father of industrialist J. Paul Getty and patriarch of the Getty family
- John W. Grabiel, Arkansas Republican gubernatorial nominee in 1922 and 1924; Ohio native, attorney in Fayetteville, Arkansas, until his death in 1928
- Stephanie L. Haines, United States federal judge
- Stacey Hairston, former Cleveland Browns player
- Thomas Hutson, doctor and medical researcher
- Robert Franklin Jones, served as Allen County (Ohio) prosecuting attorney, 1935–1939. Elected in 1938 to the Seventy-sixth U.S. Congress, and elected for three subsequent terms to Congress, serving from 1939 to 1947. Appointed commissioner of the Federal Communications Commission, serving from 1947 to 1952
- Cassius Jackson Keyser, a mathematician
- George E. Killian, a sports administrator and a president of the International University Sports Federation
- Carla F. Kim, Associate Professor of Genetics at Harvard Medical School and Principal Investigator at the Stem Cell Program at Boston Children's Hospital
- Cheryl L. Mason, Chairman, Board of Veterans' Appeals, US Department of Veterans' Affairs (2017-2022), Inspector General, US Department of Veterans’ Affairs (Incumbent)
- Clay Mathile, former owner of Iams pet food
- Harry McNeal, Major League baseball player
- Bill Peterson, former head football coach at Florida State, Rice University, and with the Houston Oilers
- Bob Peterson, story artist, animator and voice actor
- Tom Reed, United States Congressman from New York
- David P. Reese (1871–1935), member of the Pennsylvania House of Representatives
- Joseph Banks Rhine, founder of the parapsychology lab at Duke University
- Nate Riles, retired CFL player
- Jamal Robertson, retired NFL football player
- Ralph L. Ropp (class of 1923), president of Louisiana Tech University from 1949 to 1962
- Joe Thomas (1921–1983), professional football coach and executive
- Jason Trusnik, retired NFL football player. Owner of Pro Sports Performance in Strongsville, OH
- Steve Vagedes, former Arena Football League player
- Baldemar Velasquez, is president of the Farm Labor Organizing Committee, AFL–CIO
- Jim Wilson, Los Angeles city council member, studied pharmacy
