= Walter R. Nickel =

American physician

- Born: August 21, 1907; Fremont, Ohio
- Died: April 16, 1989 (aged 81); San Diego, California
- Education: Hillsdale College; University of Minnesota; Mayo Clinic
- Known for: Teaching Dermatopathology and helping to establish Dermatopathology as a specialty
- Scientific career
- Fields: Dermatology and Dermatopathology

Walter Russell "Nick" Nickel (August 21, 1907 – April 16, 1989) was an American dermatologist who was one of the founders of the field of dermatopathology. He was a co-founder and president of four different professional societies and was the founding chairman of the Division of Dermatology at the University of California, San Diego Medical Center.

== Education ==
He graduated from Hillsdale College in 1929, then earned his M.D. degree from the University of Minnesota in 1938. He interned at Minneapolis General Hospital. He completed a residency in his field (which was then called Dermatology and Syphilology) as a Medical Fellow at the Mayo Clinic in Rochester, Minnesota, earning an M.S. degree in dermatology in 1941.

== Career ==
Upon completing his training he went directly into the Army Medical Corps, during World War II. He served for several years in Vancouver, Washington, then was sent to the Philippines until his discharge in 1946. He then moved with his family to San Diego, California, where he set up a solo dermatology practice. He continued in private practice there for more than 40 years, treating more than 100,000 patients. In 1954 he co-authored (with James H. Lockwood) the book Systematized Histopathology, which has been cited as helping to establish dermatopathology as a field. In 1969 he became a clinical professor of medicine and pathology for the fledgling medical school at the University of California, San Diego, serving as the founding chair of the Division of Dermatology until 1974.

== Personal life ==
He was married for almost 50 years to Mona Eileen O’Neill, a nurse and nursing instructor he met at the University of Minnesota. They had five sons. His family was the first in the United States in which five brothers all achieved the rank of Eagle Scout.

== Achievements ==
At Balboa Hospital he outlined a teaching method called Systematized Histopathology, in which the skin is divided into layers, and the skin diseases of each layer are studied along with pathologic changes that result. His students at the Naval Hospital compiled a list of his aphorisms and sayings, which they called “Nick’s Nuggets,” as a teaching aid for residents.

When the University of California, San Diego opened its new medical school and hospital in the 1960s, he was the founding chairman of the Division of Dermatology. He was active in national dermatology societies and was a pioneer in the field of dermatopathology. He helped to establish the field as a separate and distinct branch of both pathology and dermatology. He was a founder of four professional societies and served as president of all of them.

In the 1940s he created the Clinicopathologic Conference, a study of individual cases from both the clinical and pathological standpoint, at the annual meeting of the Pacific Dermatologic Association. He personally organized the CPC every year for decades and it remains the most popular event of the meeting to this day. He was also instrumental in establishing the clinicopathologic conference in dermatology at the annual meeting of the Southern Medical Association.

He and three colleagues created the Self-Assessment Test for the annual meeting of the American Society of Dermatopathology. The test is still a major feature of the society's annual meetings.

== Awards and honours ==
- Practitioner of the Year, Dermatology Foundation, 1981
- Physician of the Year, San Diego County Medical Society, 1983

Citizen of the Year, San Diego City Club, 1983

In 1989 when Nickel died, then-Senator Pete Wilson eulogized him on the floor of the Senate and placed his obituary in the Congressional Record.

The American Society of Dermatopathology gives an annual award called the Walter R. Nickel Award for Excellence in Teaching of Dermatopathology.

The Pacific Dermatologic Association named its annual clinicopathologic conference for him and a colleague, Louis H. Winer. The annual event is called the Nickel/Winer Clinicopathologic Conference, and the prize for the best case submitted is called the “Nickel/Winer Best CPC Case” award.
