= Henry Solomon Lehr =

Founder of Ohio Northern University

President of Ohio Northern University
- In office 1871–1900
- Preceded by: Position established
- Succeeded by: Leroy Belt

Personal details
- Born: March 8, 1838 Mahoning County, Ohio, U.S.
- Died: January 28, 1923 (aged 84) Ada, Ohio, U.S.
- Education: Mount Union College (PhD)
- Known for: Founding Ohio Northern University

Henry Solomon Lehr (March 8, 1838 – January 28, 1923) was the founder of Ohio Northern University. The Lehr Building at that school was named in his honor.

Born the 11th child to George and Salome Lehr in Oldtown, Mahoning County, Ohio, Henry Lehr first attended school at the age of 12 while still working full-time as a farm hand. His primary interest was in scholarship, so in 1854 he earned his teaching certification and began part-time teaching while still continuing to do his farm work. He then enrolled at Mount Union College in March 1857. As a student there, Lehr began to develop the idea that colleges should design their schedules and curriculum to the convenience of the student - an idea which up until that point had not been implemented in schools of higher learning.

Lehr's studies were interrupted by the American Civil War. When discharged, in 1865, Lehr was tired of the migratory life of teachers at the time, and felt compelled to do more with his teaching. In 1866 Lehr moved to Ada, Ohio, and became the schoolmaster there. He negotiated to use the facilities after classes to teach a "select school" for those wishing education beyond that offered during the day. As his reputation grew throughout the area, the number of select school students increased, and in 1870, Lehr felt sufficiently well established to approach the citizens of Ada for funds to purchase land for a campus and an academic building. In August 1871, the Northwestern Ohio Normal School, later Ohio Northern University, was launched. While all this was going on, Lehr managed to find time to commute back to home to complete the requirements for his PhD degree at Mount Union College, graduating 10 years behind the class with which he had entered.

During Ohio Northern University's early years, Lehr attempted to keep tuition as low as possible to enable as many people as possible to afford to enroll. Unfortunately, by the 1890s, the school faced financial difficulties. To place the university on sound financial footing, Lehr transferred Ohio Normal University to the Methodist Church, and since 1899, the institution has been affiliated with the Church. In 1903, Ohio Normal University became Ohio Northern University.

Lehr was president of Ohio Northern University from 1871 to 1900. Dr. Leroy Belt was selected as the new president in May 1901. From 1901 to 1903 Lehr agreed to continue on as secretary, treasurer, and general manager. Due to differences with Belt, Lehr severed his ties with the university at the end of the 1902–03 academic year. He then moved to Winona Lake, Indiana. On April 27, 1905, President Belt resigned, and Dr. Albert Edwin Smith became Ohio Northern's third president. With the change of administrations, Lehr returned to Ada in September 1905. Lehr's memoirs appeared in serial form in the University Herald of Ada; the memoirs occupied Lehr from 1904 to early 1909.

Henry Solomon Lehr died on January 28, 1923, in Ada, Ohio.
