= Fremont, Ohio =

- City
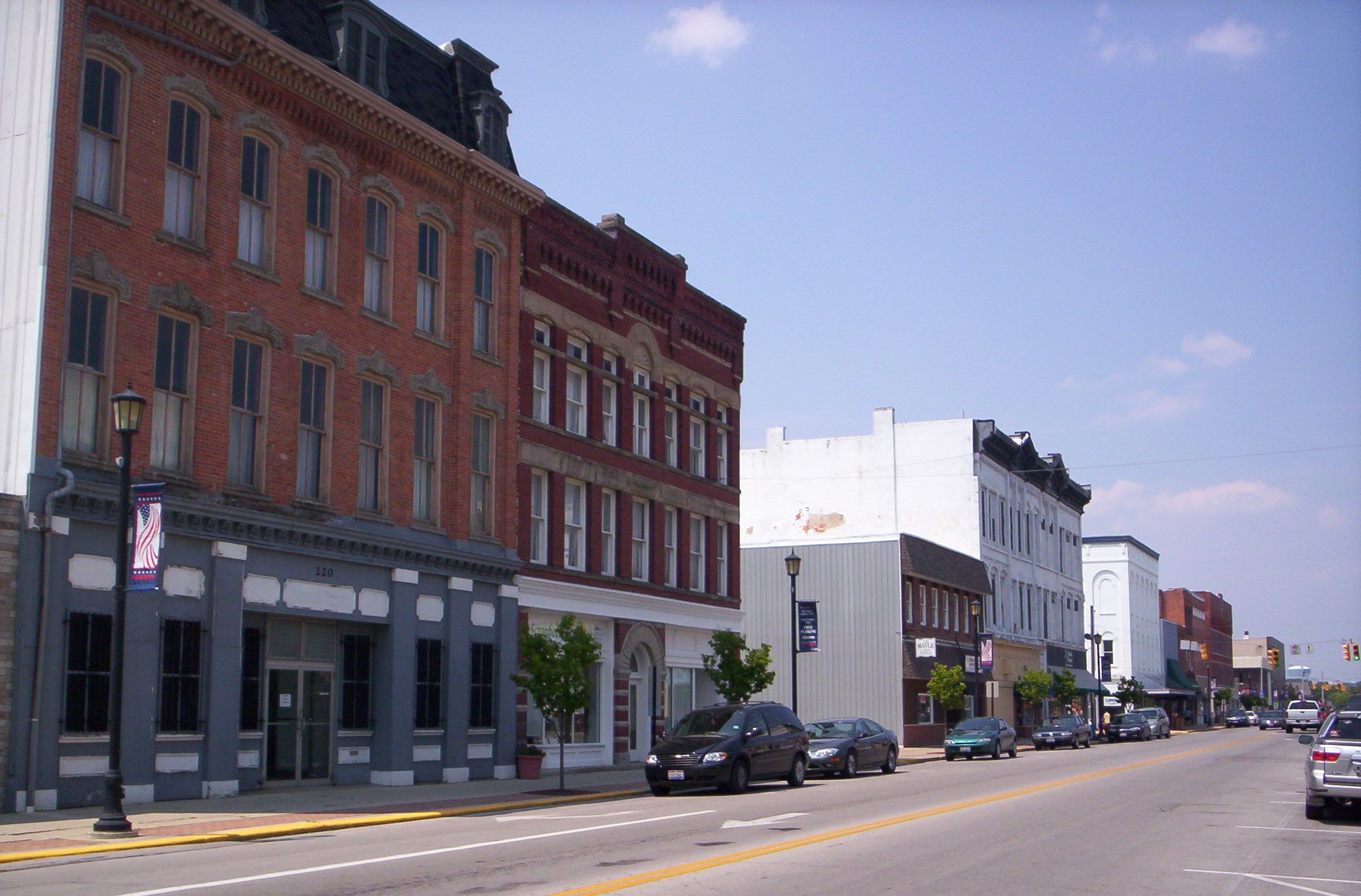
- Downtown Fremont, Ohio on South Front Street
- Nickname: Cutlery Capital of the World
- Motto: "Where People Come First"
- Interactive map of Fremont, Ohio
- Location within Ohio Location within the United States
- Coordinates: 41°21′48″N 83°08′42″W
- Country: United States
- State: Ohio
- County: Sandusky
- Township: Ballville, Sandusky

Government
  - Mayor: Danny Sanchez (R)

Area
  - Total: 8.74 sq mi (22.64 km^{2})
  - Land: 8.52 sq mi (22.07 km^{2})
  - Water: 0.22 sq mi (0.57 km^{2})
- Elevation: 581 ft (177 m)

Population (2020)
  - Total: 15,930
  - Estimate (2023): 15,812
  - Density: 1,869/sq mi (721.7/km^{2})
- Time zone: UTC-5 (Eastern (EST))
  - Summer (DST): UTC-4 (EDT)
- ZIP code: 43420
- Area codes: 419, 567
- FIPS code: 39-28826
- GNIS feature ID: 1086909
- Website: fremontohio.org

Fremont is a city in Sandusky County, Ohio, United States, and its county seat. It is located along the Sandusky River about 35 miles (56 km) southeast of Toledo and 25 miles (40 km) west of Sandusky. The population was 15,930 at the 2020 census.

The city was the home of Rutherford B. Hayes, who served as President of the United States from 1877 to 1881. The Rutherford B. Hayes Presidential Center was the first presidential library and is one of the focal points of the city. The National Arbor Day Foundation has designated Fremont as a Tree City USA since 1986.

== History ==
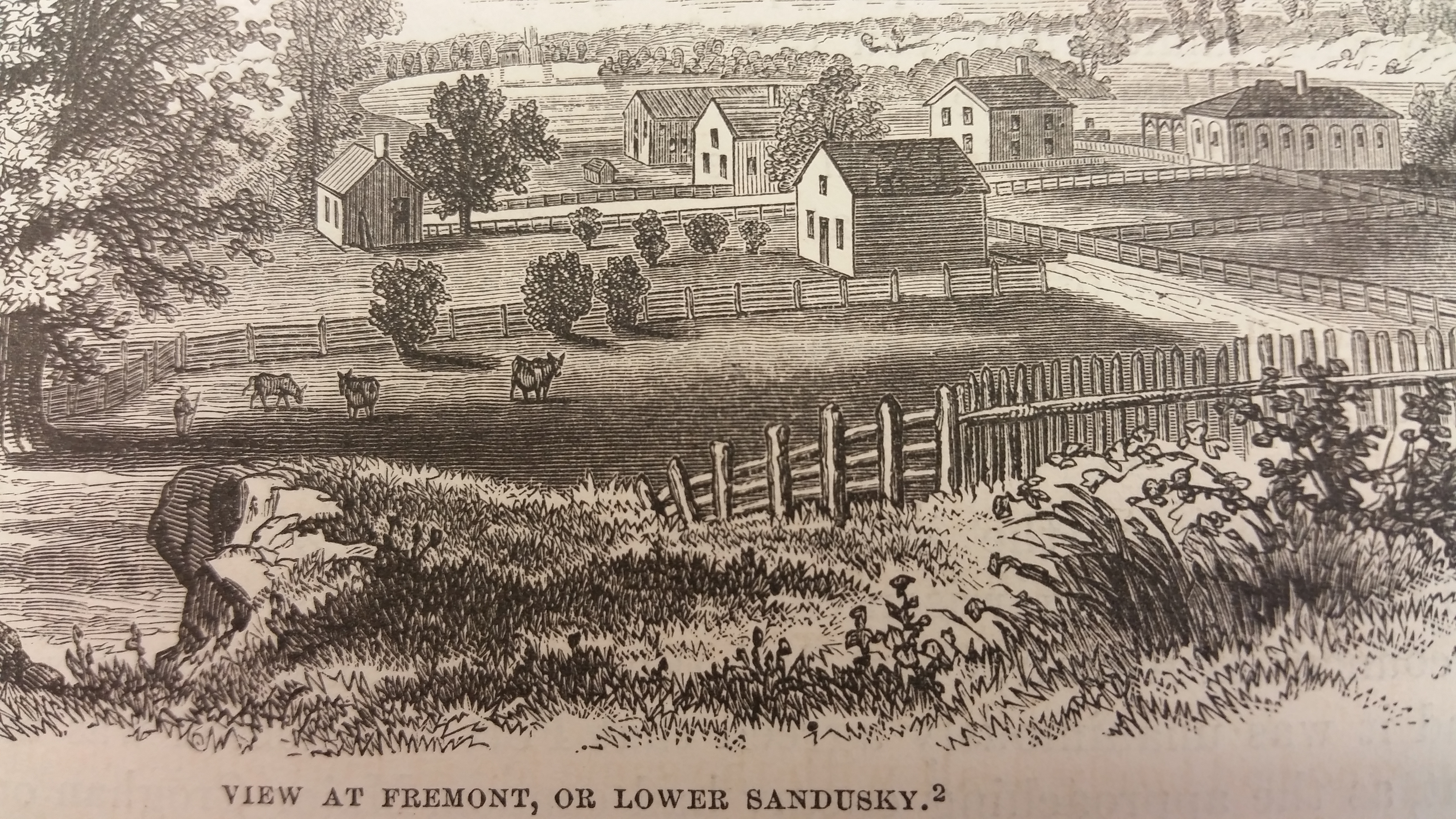
Drawing of Fremont in the early 19th century

Fremont is located on the former site of Junquindundeh, a historic Wyandot village on the west bank of the lower Sandusky River, near the falls and about 15 miles (24 km) upstream from its mouth at Sandusky Bay. French merchants established a trading post there in the 1750s, but British forces took over the trading post and rest of the area after their victory in the French and Indian War.

In 1787, the newly independent United States created the Northwest Territory to include all land west of the Ohio River. In 1803 the southeastern portion of the Northwest Territory was admitted to the Union as the new state of Ohio. Under the terms of Ohio's statehood, the area of Lower Sandusky was defined as Indian Territory. American settlers who entered the area were in violation of the 1795 Treaty of Greenville, which was meant to preserve at least some land for the Native Americans. During the War of 1812 the United States Army considered removing by force the white settlers who were violating the Treaty of Greenville, but they did not carry out the threat.

Tensions with Great Britain increased in the early 1800s, and the United States government declared a boycott on all trade with the British, including those in Canada. In 1812, war was declared, and the U.S. Army built Fort Sandusky near the river to protect supply depots further upriver. The post was expanded in early 1813 and the name was changed to Fort Stephenson. In August 1813, British forces attacked and the Battle of Fort Stephenson took place. Major George Croghan and his garrison of 160 men successfully fought off the invaders.

With the return of peace, a settlement grew up around the fort and became known as Lower Sandusky, since it was located on the lower part of the Sandusky River. In 1821 Lower Sandusky was designated as the county seat of Sandusky County. The town gradually increased in size, with the primary occupations being shipbuilding, fishing, and agricultural processing. Sandusky Bay leads to Lake Erie, and there was good fishing for walleye in the river, which return annually to spawn upriver. By the 1830s, the population included more white settlers, despite the area being a declared reserve only for Native Americans. Numerous Wyandot people still lived in the area, and some runaway African American slaves had made it their home after reaching safety in the free state of Ohio. The city had grain and sawmills, and the first sugar mill in Ohio.

In 1849 the residents changed the name of Lower Sandusky to Fremont, to honor John C. Frémont, who helped acquire California during the Mexican–American War.

In 1873, a few years before gaining national office, future president Rutherford B. Hayes moved into a family mansion in Fremont called Spiegel Grove, which was built by his late maternal uncle. That year Hayes announced his uncle Sardis Birchard's bequest in his will, donating property in his estate worth $50,000 to the City Council in order to establish a public library. It opened the following year on Front Street. A few years later, a new building was constructed for it in 1878 on the grounds of the Fort Stephenson State Park, per his bequest. It is now known as the Birchard Public Library of Sandusky County. Spiegel Grove was incorporated into the Rutherford B. Hayes Presidential Center, founded in 1916 as the first presidential library in the United States.

In the late 19th and early 20th centuries, Fremont became a major center for the production of cutlery, with several manufacturing plants, as well as other industries. The cutlery industry has declined, but the city still has a large Heinz plant for producing ketchup. In 1999, the ketchup factory saw a $40 million expansion.

=== Commemoration of Battle of Fort Stephenson ===
In 1878, the city established Fort Stephenson Park, also known as Fort Stephenson Square, to preserve and commemorate the site of the fort that had a role in the War of 1812. In 1885 the Sandusky County Soldiers Monument was installed in the park near Croghan Street, which was named after the commanding major of the fort. Former president Rutherford B. Hayes attended the ceremony.

In 1906 Croghan's remains were brought from his hometown in Kentucky to Fremont and reinterred under the Soldiers Monument. In the same ceremony, the Daughters of the American Revolution (DAR) unveiled a plaque to the Soldiers Monument to commemorate Croghan and his garrison in their victory in the Battle of Fort Stephenson.

What is now the main building of the Birchard Public Library, which serves the entire county, was constructed in 1878 in Fort Stephenson Park, by the terms of the bequest from Sardis Birchard, who bequeathed $50,000 in assets to endow a public library in 1873. The first facility opened in 1874 in a building on Front Street.

== Geography ==
Fremont is located on both sides of the Sandusky River.

The city has a total area of 8.57 square miles (22.20 km^{2}), of which 8.35 square miles (21.63 km^{2}) is land and 0.22 square miles (0.57 km^{2}) is water.

=== Climate ===
Climate data for Fremont, Ohio, 1991–2020 normals, extremes 1901–present
Month	Jan	Feb	Mar	Apr	May	Jun	Jul	Aug	Sep	Oct	Nov	Dec	Year
Record high °F (°C)	73 (23)	75 (24)	86 (30)	93 (34)	96 (36)	107 (42)	110 (43)	105 (41)	105 (41)	93 (34)	80 (27)	72 (22)	110 (43)
Mean maximum °F (°C)	56.2 (13.4)	58.8 (14.9)	69.9 (21.1)	80.9 (27.2)	88.3 (31.3)	93.6 (34.2)	94.6 (34.8)	93.8 (34.3)	91.3 (32.9)	83.3 (28.5)	69.2 (20.7)	59.9 (15.5)	96.2 (35.7)
Mean daily maximum °F (°C)	33.7 (0.9)	36.6 (2.6)	46.7 (8.2)	59.9 (15.5)	71.5 (21.9)	81.1 (27.3)	85.0 (29.4)	82.9 (28.3)	76.8 (24.9)	64.1 (17.8)	50.3 (10.2)	38.8 (3.8)	60.6 (15.9)
Daily mean °F (°C)	26.1 (−3.3)	28.3 (−2.1)	37.3 (2.9)	48.9 (9.4)	60.4 (15.8)	70.4 (21.3)	74.0 (23.3)	72.0 (22.2)	65.2 (18.4)	53.2 (11.8)	41.5 (5.3)	31.6 (−0.2)	50.7 (10.4)
Mean daily minimum °F (°C)	18.5 (−7.5)	20.0 (−6.7)	27.8 (−2.3)	38.0 (3.3)	49.5 (9.7)	59.7 (15.4)	63.1 (17.3)	61.0 (16.1)	53.6 (12.0)	42.4 (5.8)	32.8 (0.4)	24.5 (−4.2)	40.9 (4.9)
Mean minimum °F (°C)	−2.1 (−18.9)	2.5 (−16.4)	11.6 (−11.3)	24.9 (−3.9)	34.9 (1.6)	45.8 (7.7)	52.2 (11.2)	49.9 (9.9)	40.4 (4.7)	29.2 (−1.6)	19.0 (−7.2)	8.1 (−13.3)	−4.5 (−20.3)
Record low °F (°C)	−20 (−29)	−17 (−27)	−5 (−21)	6 (−14)	27 (−3)	38 (3)	44 (7)	34 (1)	30 (−1)	19 (−7)	0 (−18)	−17 (−27)	−20 (−29)
Average precipitation inches (mm)	2.73 (69)	2.42 (61)	2.81 (71)	3.83 (97)	3.80 (97)	4.10 (104)	3.63 (92)	3.37 (86)	3.23 (82)	2.91 (74)	2.77 (70)	2.60 (66)	38.20 (970)
Average snowfall inches (cm)	8.4 (21)	6.9 (18)	3.7 (9.4)	1.0 (2.5)	0.0 (0.0)	0.0 (0.0)	0.0 (0.0)	0.0 (0.0)	0.0 (0.0)	0.0 (0.0)	0.9 (2.3)	5.3 (13)	26.2 (66.2)
Average precipitation days (≥ 0.01 in)	12.2	10.1	10.6	12.6	12.9	11.2	10.3	8.9	9.1	10.1	10.2	10.7	128.9
Average snowy days (≥ 0.1 in)	6.2	5.1	2.3	0.4	0.0	0.0	0.0	0.0	0.0	0.0	0.8	3.4	18.2
Source 1: NOAA
Source 2: National Weather Service

== Demographics ==
Historical population
Census	Pop.	Note	%±
1830	351		—
1840	1,117		218.2%
1850	1,464		31.1%
1860	3,510		139.8%
1870	5,455		55.4%
1880	8,440		54.7%
1890	7,141		−15.4%
1900	8,439		18.2%
1910	9,939		17.8%
1920	12,468		25.4%
1930	13,422		7.7%
1940	14,710		9.6%
1950	16,537		12.4%
1960	18,767		13.5%
1970	18,490		−1.5%
1980	17,887		−3.3%
1990	17,648		−1.3%
2000	17,375		−1.5%
2010	16,734		−3.7%
2020	15,930		−4.8%
2023 (est.)	15,812		−0.7%

=== 2020 census ===
As of the 2020 census, Fremont had a population of 15,930, the median age was 38.7 years, 24.6% of residents were under the age of 18, and 17.6% of residents were 65 years of age or older. For every 100 females there were 93.5 males, and for every 100 females age 18 and over there were 91.2 males.

99.1% of residents lived in urban areas, while 0.9% lived in rural areas.

There were 6,768 households in Fremont, of which 28.4% had children under the age of 18 living in them, 31.9% were married-couple households, 23.6% were households with a male householder and no spouse or partner present, and 35.1% were households with a female householder and no spouse or partner present. About 36.7% of all households were made up of individuals, and 15.1% had someone living alone who was 65 years of age or older.

There were 7,506 housing units, of which 9.8% were vacant. The homeowner vacancy rate was 2.5% and the rental vacancy rate was 7.1%.

Racial composition as of the 2020 census
Race	Number	Percent
White	11,565	72.6%
Black or African American	1,478	9.3%
American Indian and Alaska Native	104	0.7%
Asian	61	0.4%
Native Hawaiian and Other Pacific Islander	5	0.0%
Some other race	913	5.7%
Two or more races	1,804	11.3%
Hispanic or Latino (of any race)	2,891	18.1%

=== 2010 census ===
As of the census of 2010, there were 16,734 people, 6,745 households, and 4,162 families residing in the city. The population density was 2,004.1 inhabitants per square mile (773.8/km^{2}). There were 7,541 housing units at an average density of 903.1 per square mile (348.7/km^{2}). The racial makeup of the city was 80.7% White, 8.3% African American, 0.2% Native American, 0.3% Asian, 5.3% from other races, and 5.1% from two or more races. Hispanic or Latino people of any race were 16.1% of the population.

There were 6,745 households, of which 34.2% had children under the age of 18 living with them, 37.1% were married couples living together, 18.7% had a female householder with no husband present, 5.9% had a male householder with no wife present, and 38.3% were non-families. 32.5% of all households were made up of individuals, and 12% had someone living alone who was 65 years of age or older. The average household size was 2.42 and the average family size was 3.04.

The median age in the city was 35.3 years. 27.2% of residents were under the age of 18; 8.6% were between the ages of 18 and 24; 25.7% were from 25 to 44; 24.7% were from 45 to 64; and 13.9% were 65 years of age or older. The gender makeup of the city was 47.8% male and 52.2% female.

=== 2000 census ===
As of the census of 2000, there were 17,375 people, 6,856 households, and 4,374 families residing in the city. The population density was 2,313 inhabitants per square mile (893/km^{2}). There were 7,368 housing units at an average density of 980.9 per square mile (378.7/km^{2}). The racial makeup of the city was 82.24% White, 8.29% African American, 0.18% Native American, 0.24% Asian, 5.85% from other races, and 3.19% from two or more races. Hispanic or Latino people of any race were 12.32% of the population.

There were 6,856 households, out of which 33.6% had children under the age of 18 living with them, 42.5% were married couples living together, 16.4% had a female householder with no husband present, and 36.2% were non-families. 30.4% of all households were made up of individuals, and 12.8% had someone living alone who was 65 years of age or older. The average household size was 2.46 and the average family size was 3.06.

In the city the population was spread out, with 27.6% under the age of 18, 10.0% from 18 to 24, 28.7% from 25 to 44, 19.3% from 45 to 64, and 14.4% who were 65 years of age or older. The median age was 34 years. For every 100 females, there were 89.9 males. For every 100 females age 18 and over, there were 85.0 males.

The median income for a household in the city was $34,051, and the median income for a family was $39,439. Males had a median income of $32,453 versus $22,048 for females. The per capita income for the city was $16,014. About 9.8% of families and 12.9% of the population were below the poverty line, including 16.8% of those under age 18 and 9.9% of those age 65 or over.

== Economy ==
The world's largest ketchup plant, operated by Heinz is located in Fremont, producing 80% of the ketchup sold in the United States. At one time the city was home to several cutlery companies: the Christy Company, Clauss Cutlery Company, Quikut, B.A.P. Manufacturing, the Ginsu Cutlery Line, and Herbrand tools. It was also home to a Pioneer Sugar processing plant which closed in 1997, but as of 2020, remains a Michigan Sugar warehouse, despite plans in 2009 to open an ethanol refinery plant on the site.

== Government ==
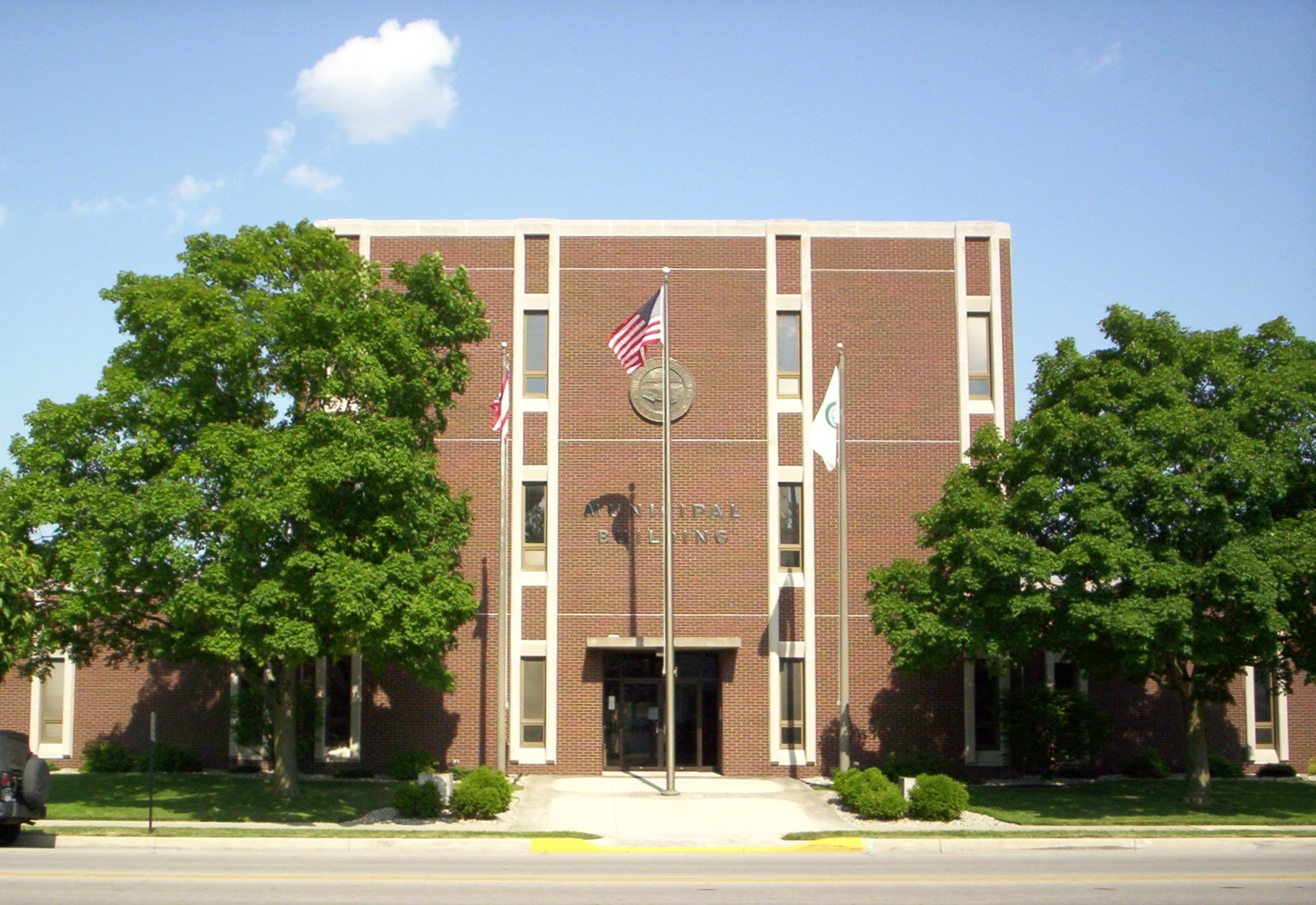
Fremont Municipal Building in downtown Fremont

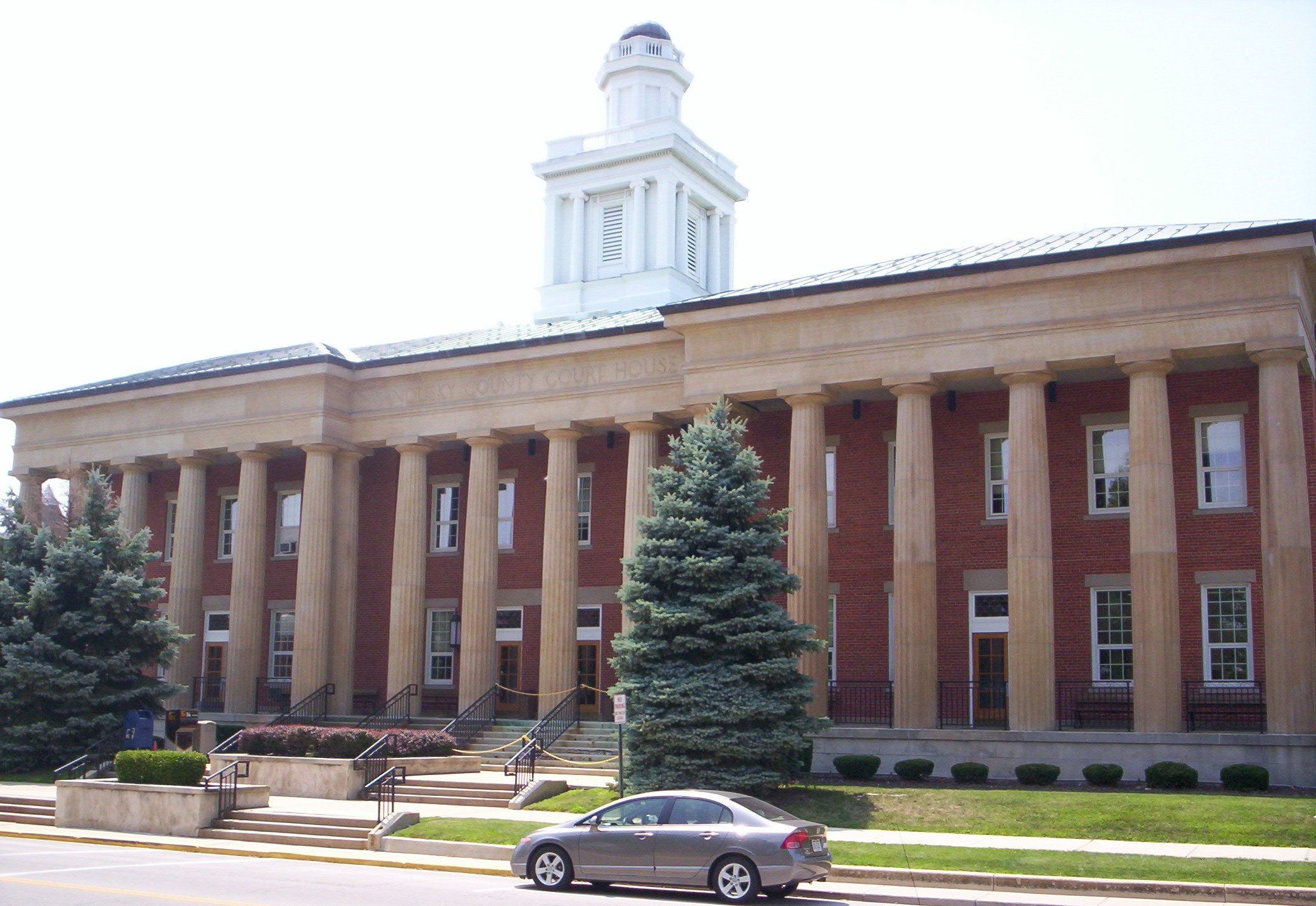
Sandusky County Courthouse in Fremont

Mayor	Daniel R. Sanchez	Republican
President of Council	Jamie Hafford	Independent
Auditor	Paul D. Grahl	Democrat
Law Director	James F. Melle	Democrat
Treasurer	Holly R. Elder	Democrat
Council At Large	Kristine Weiss	Republican
Council At Large	John S. Elder	Democrat
Council At Large	Denis Otte	Republican
1st Ward Council	Justin C. Smith	Republican
2nd Ward Council	James S. Sleek	Democrat
3rd Ward Council	Angie Ruiz	Democrat
4th Ward Council	Christopher E. Liebold	Democrat
Municipal Judge	Daniel L. Brudzinski	Republican

== Arts and culture ==
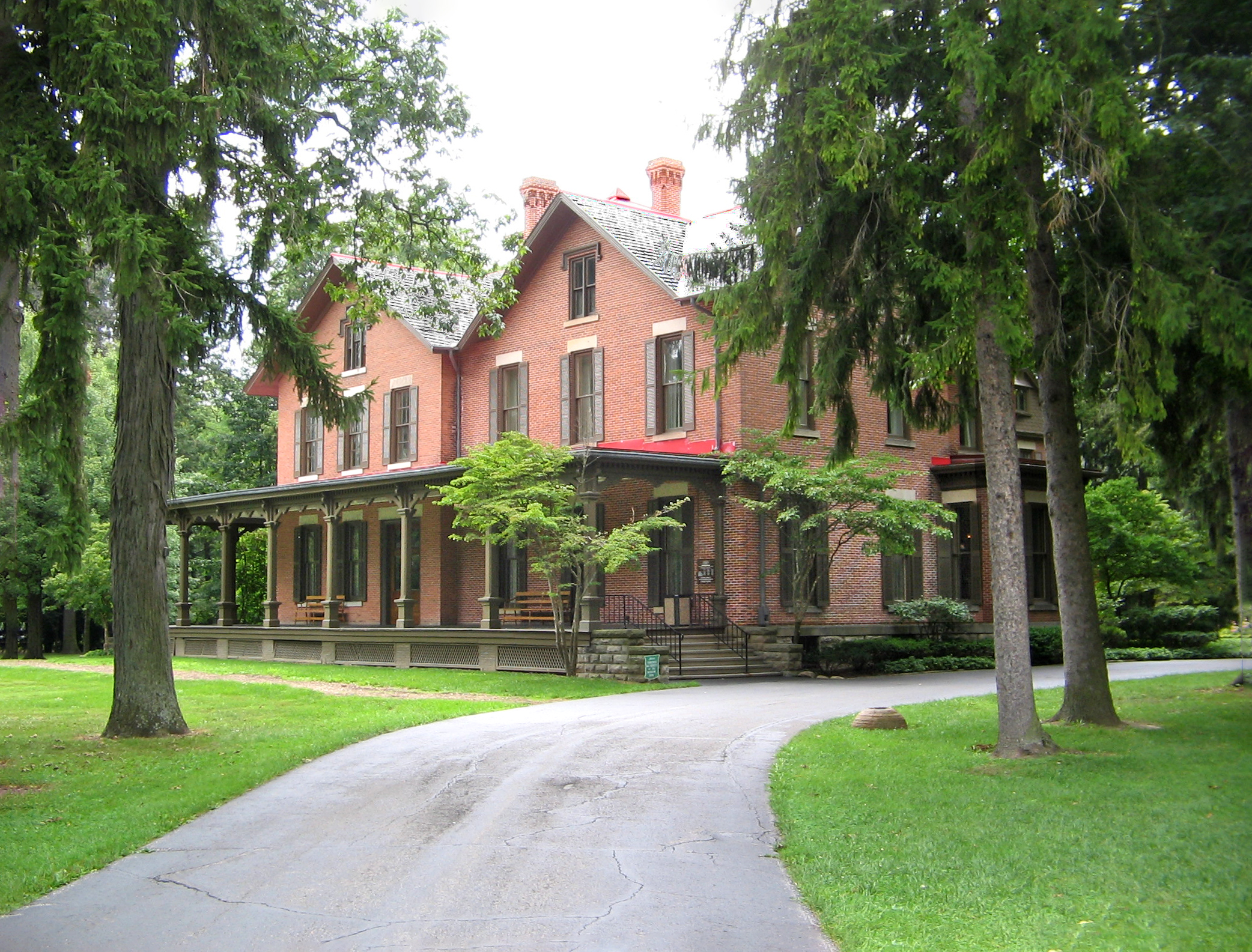
The Rutherford B. Hayes House at Spiegel Grove

=== Landmarks ===
- Birchard Public Library (built in a park at the former site of Fort Stephenson)
- H. J. Heinz Company ketchup factory (the world's largest ketchup factory)
- Rutherford B. Hayes Presidential Center
- Sandusky County Jail and Sheriff's House
- Spiegel Grove
- Fremont Speedway
- The Strand Concert Theater
- Fremont Amphitheater

=== Historic downtown Fremont ===
Downtown Fremont is located next to the Sandusky River on Front Street. Front Street has a pedestrian scale and is home to many small businesses in historic buildings: they include boutiques, gift shops, restaurants, and other attractions. Downtown Fremont has been the center of the city for many years.

== Education ==
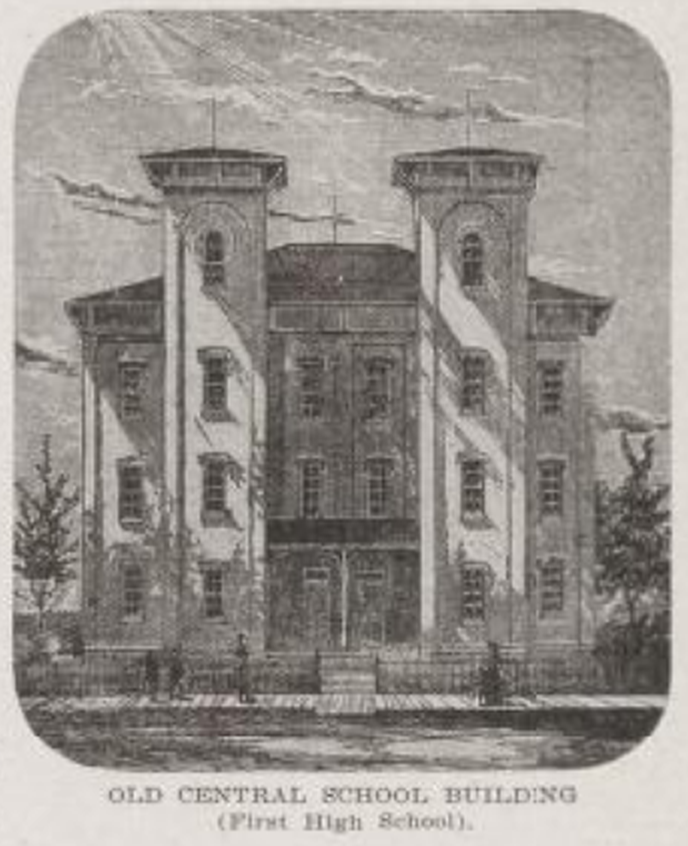
First high school in Fremont

Public education is provided by the Fremont City School District, which enrolls 3,519 students in public primary and secondary schools. The district administers four elementary schools, one middle school, and one high school, Fremont Ross. The city is also home to Vanguard-Sentinel Career and Technology Centers, offering career-specific college level classes, Bishop Hoffman Catholic Schools, affiliated with the Roman Catholic Diocese of Toledo, which serves students in grades preschool through 12 and includes Saint Joseph Central Catholic High School for grades nine through 12. Another private school for grades preschool through grade 12, Temple Christian Academy, is operated by Fremont Baptist Temple. The first public school was erected in 1816.

Terra State Community College, a two-year community college founded in 1968, is located on a 143-acre (58 ha) campus in the western part of the city. It has an enrollment of approximately 2,400 students, mainly from Sandusky, Seneca, and Ottawa counties.

Fremont has a public library, a branch of the Birchard Public Library of Sandusky County.

== Media ==
Fremont's daily newspaper is The News-Messenger. WFRO-FM (99.1 FM) "Eagle 99" broadcasts from Fremont.

== Infrastructure ==
=== Transportation ===
Two long-distance US routes run through Fremont, U.S. Route 6 and U.S. Route 20. State Routes 12, 19, 53 and 412 also pass through or terminate in the Fremont area. SR 53 roughly parallels the path of the Sandusky River, designated as a state scenic river, to its mouth at Sandusky Bay.

None of these routes passes through Fremont but were constructed outside. They are multiplexed on a bypass of the city, most of which is 4 lanes. The bypass has both grade-level crossings and controlled-access interchanges. Prior to completion of the bypass in the late 1950s, all of these routes passed through Fremont. Their former alignments are currently signed as "City Route (number)", with the number being that of the predecessor highway.

The Ohio Turnpike, another long-distance east–west route, passes approximately 4 miles north of the city. The Turnpike is signed as Interstates 80 and 90. Exit 91 (originally Exit 6) links the Turnpike to Fremont via State Route 53.

Industry is served by the Norfolk Southern railroad. In the city, it uses parts of two defunct railroads as spurs to factories.

The Sandusky County Regional Airport is located five nautical miles (5.8 mi; 9.3 km) southeast of Sandusky's central business district. Fremont Airport is also located two nautical miles (2.3 mi; 3.7 km) southwest of the city's central business district.

== Notable people ==
- Margret Holmes Bates (1844–1927), author
- Alycia Baumgardner, model, professional boxer in the World Boxing Council and International Boxing Organization
- Tom Beier, professional football player in the National Football League (NFL), All-American in college football
- Bob Brudzinski, professional football player in the NFL
- Clarence Childs, member of 1912 US Olympic team, bronze medalist in the hammer throw
- Mark Coleman, mixed martial artist in UFC, member of UFC Hall of Fame and 1992 US Olympic wrestling team
- Everton Conger, capturer of John Wilkes Booth
- Dana DeMuth, professional umpire in Major League Baseball
- Paul Dietzel, former head coach in college football
- Doug Gallagher, professional baseball player in Major League Baseball
- Andy Genzman, racing driver
- Robert W. Hines, national wildlife artist for the U.S. Fish and Wildlife Service
- Alice E. Johnson, architect
- Carla F. Kim, Associate Professor of Genetics at Harvard Medical School
- Robert Knepper, actor, role of "T-Bag" in the Prison Break television series
- Tony Little, television fitness personality
- Rob Lytle, professional football player in the NFL, member of College Football Hall of Fame
- Shawn McCarthy, former NFL punter for the New England Patriots
- Margaret Good Myers (1899–1988), economist and author
- Walter R. Nickel, dermatologist
- Myles Porter, member of 2012 US Paralympic Team, silver medalist in judo
- Gary Shilling, financial analyst and commentator
- Bob Snyder, professional football player and head coach in the NFL
- Diane Wray Williams, Minnesota state legislator, businesswoman, and teacher
- Charles Woodson, professional football player in the NFL, Heisman Trophy winner, and member of Pro Football Hall of Fame
- Jacob Wukie, member of the 2012 US Olympic team, silver medalist in recurve archery
