= Rutherford P. Hayes =

American librarian and businessman (1858–1927)

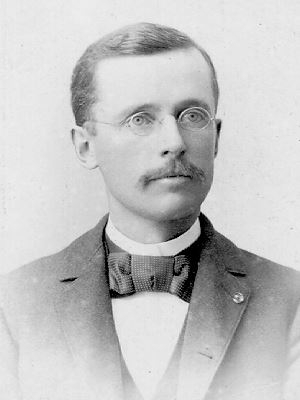

President of the American Library Association
- In office October 1897 – January 1898
- Preceded by: Justin Winsor
- Succeeded by: Herbert Putnam

Personal details
- Born: Rutherford Platt Hayes; June 24, 1858 Cincinnati, Ohio, U.S.
- Died: July 31, 1927 (aged 69) Tampa, Florida, U.S.
- Resting place: Spiegel Grove State Memorial; Fremont, Ohio, U.S.
- Party: Republican
- Spouse: Lucy Platt Hayes (m. 1894)
- Children: 3
- Parents: Rutherford B. Hayes; Lucy Webb
- Relatives: Webb Hayes (brother)
- Education: Michigan State University; Cornell University
- Occupation: Agriculturist; librarian

Rutherford Platt Hayes (June 24, 1858 – July 31, 1927) was an American banker, developer, agriculturist, and librarian. He was the third son of President Rutherford B. Hayes and First Lady Lucy Webb Hayes.

== Biography ==
Hayes attended Michigan State University and Cornell University, where he was a member of Delta Kappa Epsilon, graduating in 1880. He also attended the Boston Institute of Technology.

Hayes returned to his family's home in Fremont, Ohio, in 1882 and went to work for the Fremont Savings Bank. Soon after he returned to Fremont, Hayes became a Trustee of the Birchard Library, which was founded by his grand-uncle, Sardis Birchard. He introduced several progressive ideas to its management, including the introduction of a children's area and sending boxes of books to neighboring towns (similar to today's bookmobiles). He published the library's catalog as installments in a local paper. He was one of the founders of the Ohio Library Association in 1895 and advocated for a bill in the legislature to appoint a state library commission. Hayes was appointed to the Ohio Library Commission in 1896.

Hayes left Ohio for Chicago, Illinois, where he worked on library issues and developed a traveling library. He moved to Asheville, North Carolina, where he acquired large holdings of land. He worked with Asheville resident Edward W. Pearson, an African American entrepreneur, to develop new African-American residential neighborhoods in West Asheville. In North Carolina, Hayes engaged in scientific farming on a large scale. Hayes was president of the Appalachian Forest Reserve and the western North Carolina Fair. He moved to Clearwater, Florida, in 1922. In Florida, he served as chairman of the board of directors of the Clearwater Savings and Loan Association and the First Mortgage Investment Company.

Throughout his life he maintained his interest in library matters, promoting those of Asheville and Clearwater, and retaining his membership on the board of trustees of the library in Fremont, Ohio. He served as secretary of the American Library Association and also served as vice president and acting president from October 1897 through January 1898.

Hayes died on July 31, 1927, in Tampa of prostate cancer.

== See also ==
- Library science
- Bibliography
- Timeline
- Ouline

Non-profit organization positions
Preceded by Justin Winsor	President of the American Library Association; 1897–1898	Succeeded by Herbert Putnam
