= Sardis Birchard =

American merchant and property developer (1801–1874)

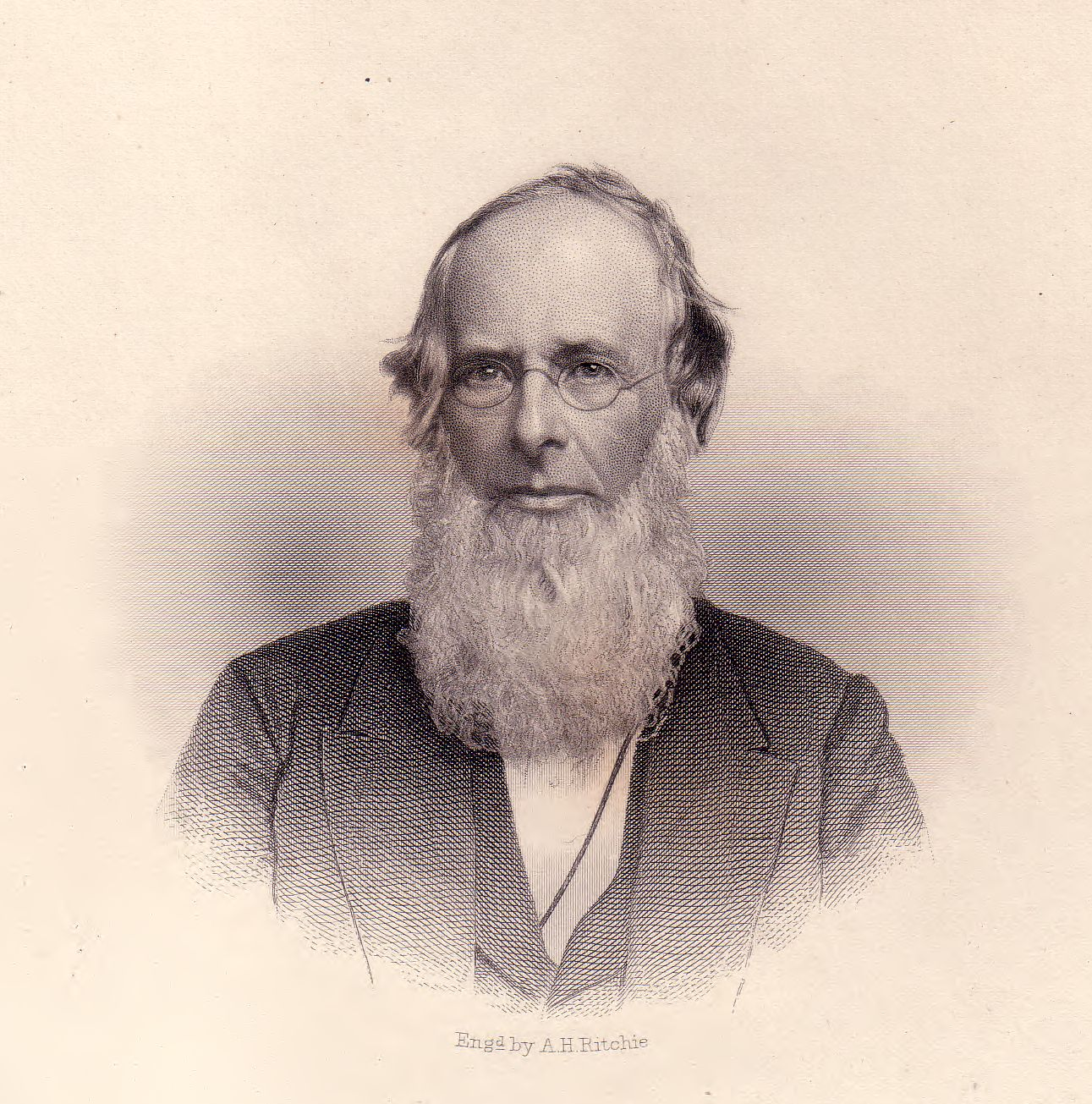
- 1871 engraving by Alexander Hay Ritchie
- Born: January 15, 1801; Wilmington, Vermont, U.S.
- Died: January 21, 1874 (aged 73); Fremont, Ohio, U.S.
- Burial place: Oakwood Cemetery
- Occupations: Merchant, property developer
- Relatives: Rutherford B. Hayes (nephew)

Sardis Birchard (January 15, 1801 – January 21, 1874) was an American property developer and merchant. He was an early supporter of his nephew Rutherford B. Hayes, who served as the 19th President of the United States.

Birchard was born in Vermont, and lived in Fremont, Ohio for much of his life, where he became a prominent businessman. His estate in Fremont, Spiegel Grove, passed to Hayes and his family after Birchard's death and is now the site of the Rutherford B. Hayes Presidential Center. Birchard is the namesake of the Birchard Public Library of Sandusky County, which was founded by Hayes with funds from Birchard's estate.

== Early life in Vermont and Ohio ==
Sardis Birchard was born on January 15, 1801, in Wilmington, Vermont to merchants Roger Birchard and Drusilla Austin Birchard. Roger and Drusilla died in 1805 and 1813 respectively, and Birchard took up residence with his sister Sophia and her husband Rutherford Ezekiel Hayes Jr. in Dummerston, Vermont.

The family moved to Delaware, Ohio in 1817. Rutherford Ezekiel Hayes died in 1822, and Birchard took over the family's affairs shortly afterward. Birchard had little formal schooling from his upbringing in Vermont, but had developed skills in hunting, livestock herding, and the retail trade.

Birchard became involved in the droving business, herding hogs across the country. In one drive in 1817, he delivered hogs to the settlers of Fort Ball, which later became the city of Tiffin, Ohio. In another drive in late 1824, he received assistance with a herd of hogs in Wheeling, West Virginia from a "a tall, fine looking gentleman on horseback who had also a carriage drawn by four horses, and two other saddle-horses with attendants." Birchard recalled that the gentleman was in fact General Andrew Jackson, who was traveling to Washington as the results of the 1824 presidential election were being contested.

== Association with Rutherford B. Hayes ==
Rutherford Birchard Hayes was born in 1822, to Sophia Birchard Hayes and Rutherford Ezekiel Hayes Jr. The elder Hayes died before his son's birth, and Birchard served as a substitute father figure. The family moved to the town of Lower Sandusky (now Fremont) in 1827.

Birchard provided financial support for Hayes' education at boarding school in Middletown, Connecticut, and later Kenyon College in Gambier, Ohio. After his studies at Kenyon, Birchard supported Hayes in his studies at Harvard Law School, where he enrolled in 1843. Hayes graduated from Harvard Law in 1845, and chose to return to Lower Sandusky to practice law. Hayes was admitted to the Ohio bar association that year, and assisted with Birchard's real estate business until he moved to Cincinnati in 1850.

== Business and philanthropy in Ohio ==
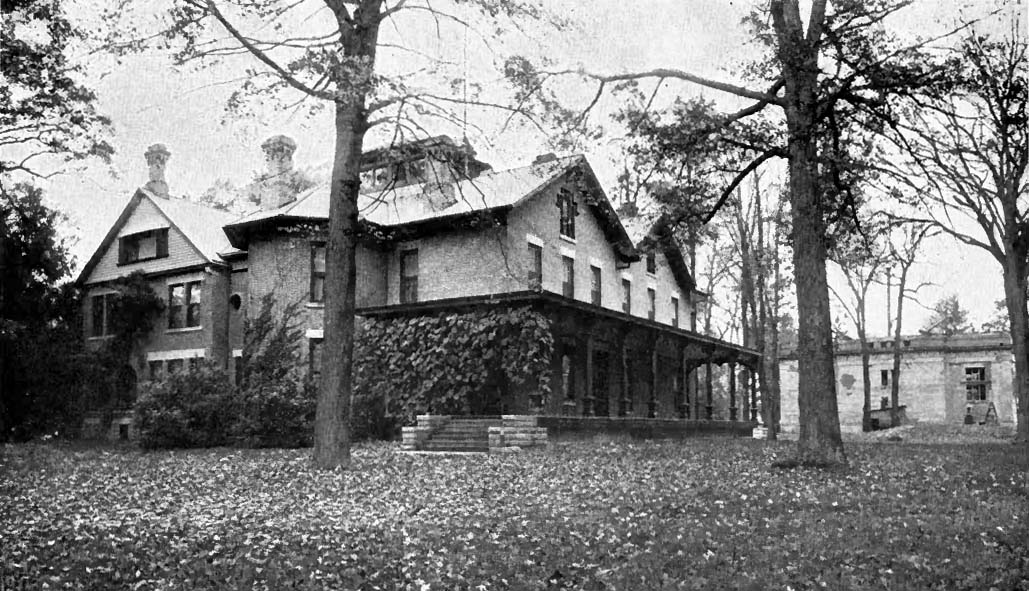
1914 photograph of Spiegel Grove, Birchard's estate in Fremont

Birchard began trading with the local Wyandot, Seneca, and Lenape people upon his arrival in Lower Sandusky, accumulating wealth of over $10,000 (equivalent to $329,000 in 2024) in three years. His retail business in Fremont became a large enterprise, and he expanded into other ventures, including property development. Birchard was unaffected by the Panic of 1837, and acquired additional lands in the depression that followed. Birchard was a founder of the Sandusky County chapter of the Whig Party, and developed friendships with prominent figures in Northwest Ohio, including Ebenezer Lane and Morrison Waite.

At the peak of Birchard's land holdings, he owned lands throughout Northwest Ohio, in Sandusky, Wood, Lucas, and Erie Counties. Birchard's business partner Rodolphus Dickinson died in 1849 amidst litigation over some of the lands. The case was decided by the Supreme Court in Boswell's Lessee v. Otis, 50 U.S. 336 (1850). In 1851, Birchard organized the first bank in Lower Sandusky with business partner Lucius B. Otis, and narrowly avoided bankruptcy in 1857 due to a loan from Hayes.

Following his success in business, Birchard developed an interest in building an estate for himself and the Hayes family, having owned a prime parcel of wooded land near Lower Sandusky since 1846. By the time construction started in 1859, the city of Lower Sandusky had gained its current name, after United States Army officer John C. Frémont. Birchard named the estate Spiegel Grove, and built its central house with the needs of Hayes' future family life in mind.

Birchard campaigned for slaveholder and Whig Party nominee Zachary Taylor in the 1848 presidential election, and was long known as an antiabolitionist. His opinion on slavery changed during the Civil War, and Birchard became a supporter of Abraham Lincoln.

== Later life and death ==
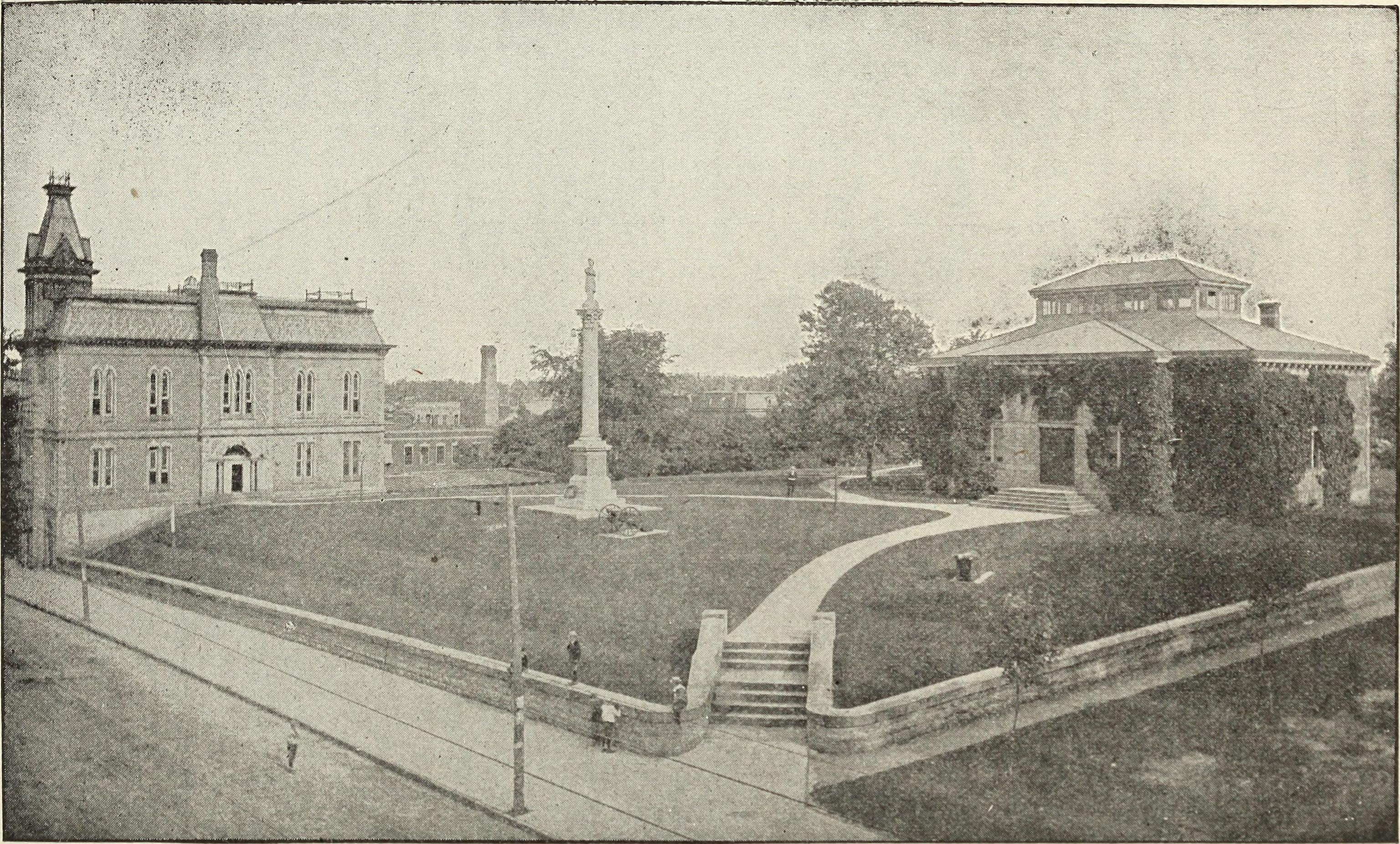
The Birchard Library on the former site of Fort Stephenson, circa 1903

Rutherford B. and Lucy Webb Hayes' two eldest sons, Birchard Austin Hayes and Webb Hayes, lived at Spiegel Grove with Birchard during Rutherford's first tenure as Governor of Ohio in the late 1860s. Rutherford preferred to have his sons in rural Fremont rather than with him in urban Columbus.

Rutherford's first term as governor ended in 1872, and he began negotiating some of Birchard's business affairs, including the potential sale of a 160-acre (65 ha) parcel of land near Toledo to the Columbus and Toledo Railroad. The sale to the railroad was unsuccessful, and Birchard deeded his interest the land to Hayes in early 1873.

Birchard donated funds for multiple civic institutions in Fremont, including the Birchard Library. Birchard and Hayes expressed a desire for the library to be constructed on the former site of Fort Stephenson, and Birchard announced a $50,000 bequest for the library in 1873. Birchard did not include the bequest in his will, as he intended to complete it while he was still alive. Hayes ultimately honored it after Birchard's death by donating the Toledo lands that he received from Birchard, which were sold to raise the majority of the funds.

Birchard died in Fremont on January 21, 1874. He is buried in Oakwood Cemetery near Fremont.

== Legacy ==
Hayes and his descendants lived at Spiegel Grove after Birchard's death. The Rutherford B. Hayes Presidential Center was constructed on the property after Hayes' death, and opened to the public in 1916. The historic house at Spiegel Grove is open to the public for tours. Spiegel Grove was designated a National Historic Landmark in 1964.

Birchard is the namesake of Birchard Avenue, a main street in Fremont. Additionally, Birchard is associated with two public parks in Fremont, which he donated land for in 1871. Birchard Park, the larger parcel, features a bandstand with a regular summer concert series. As of 2025, an improvement program for Birchard Park is proposed, which would replace the bandstand with a larger pavilion and enhance the park's connection to the North Coast Inland Trail. The smaller parcel, originally named Triangle Park, was renamed to honor former Fremont mayor Richard D. Maier in 1986.
