= Lucy Webb Hayes =

First Lady of the United States from 1877 to 1881

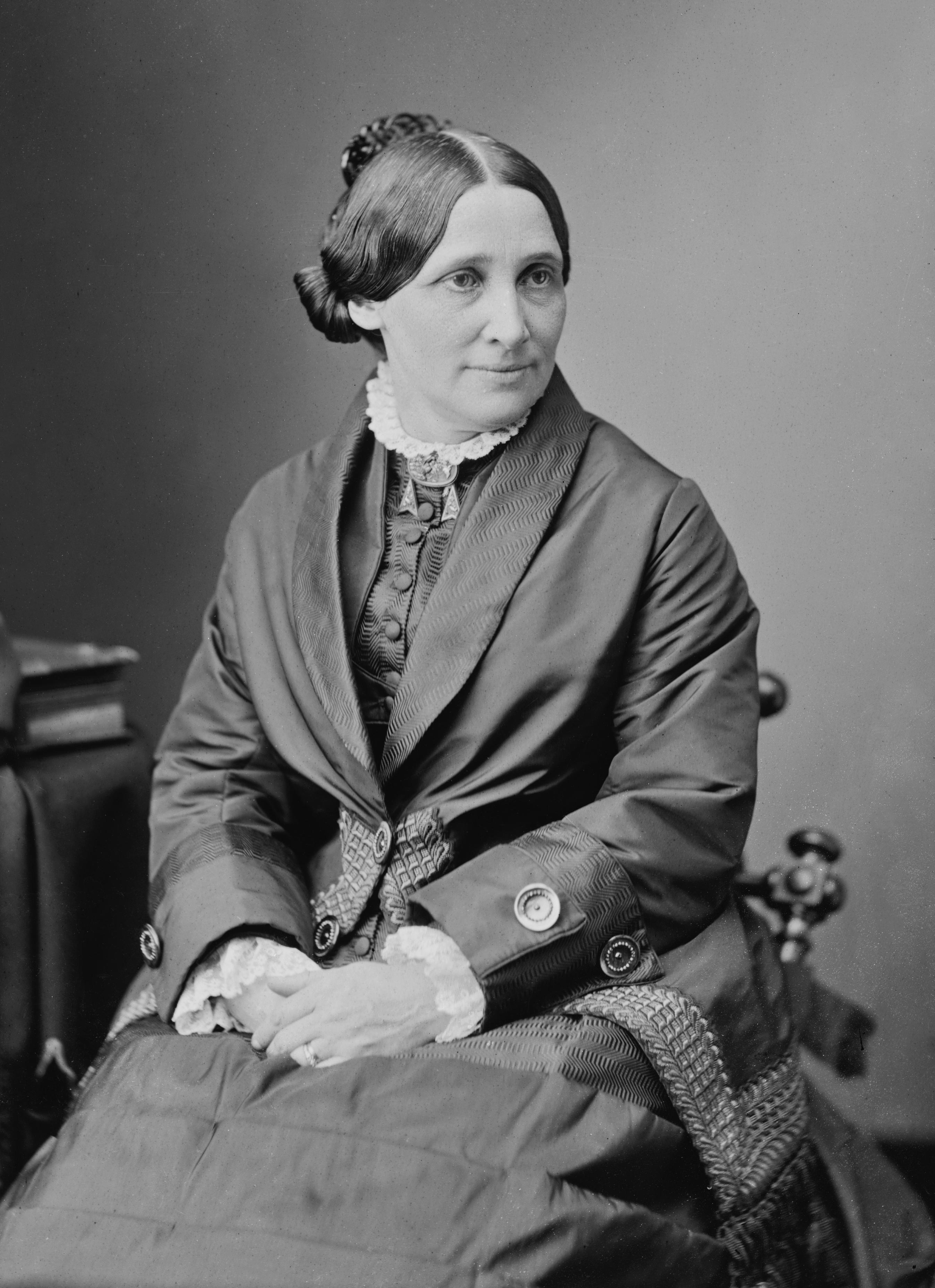
- Official portrait, c. 1877–1889

First Lady of the United States
- In role March 4, 1877 – March 4, 1881
- President: Rutherford B. Hayes
- Preceded by: Julia Dent Grant
- Succeeded by: Lucretia Rudolph Garfield

First Lady of Ohio
- In role January 10, 1876 – March 2, 1877
- Governor: Rutherford B. Hayes
- Preceded by: Margaret Noyes
- Succeeded by: Sarah Young
- In role January 12, 1868 – January 8, 1872
- Governor: Rutherford B. Hayes
- Preceded by: Helen Cox
- Succeeded by: Margaret Noyes

Personal details
- Born: Lucy Ware Webb; August 28, 1831 Chillicothe, Ohio, U.S.
- Died: June 25, 1889 (aged 57) Fremont, Ohio, U.S.
- Resting place: Spiegel Grove
- Party: Republican
- Spouse: Rutherford Birchard Hayes (m. 1852)
- Children: 8, including Webb and Rutherford
- Relatives: Margaret Hayes Clark (great-granddaughter)
- Education: Ohio Wesleyan University (BA)
- Nickname: "Lemonade Lucy"

Lucy Ware Hayes (née Webb; August 28, 1831 – June 25, 1889) was the wife of President Rutherford B. Hayes and served as the 19th first lady of the United States from 1877 to 1881. Opposed to alcohol, she never served it in the White House, a move that was highly controversial. She died of a stroke aged 57 after her husband's presidency. She was also, while her husband was governor, First Lady of Ohio. She served in this position two non-consecutive times, from 1868 to 1872, and again from 1876 until 1877, when her husband was elected as President of the United States. He resigned the governorship effective March 2, 1877, and was sworn in on the next day.

Hayes was the first First Lady to have a college degree. She was also a more egalitarian hostess than previous First Ladies. An advocate for African Americans both before and after the American Civil War, she invited the first African-American professional musician to appear at the White House. She was a Past Grand of Lincoln Rebekah Lodge, a body of the International Association of Rebekah Assemblies, the women's auxiliary of the Independent Order of Odd Fellows, together with her husband.

Historians have christened her "Lemonade Lucy" due to her staunch support of the temperance movement. However, contrary to popular belief, she was never referred to by that nickname while living. It was her husband who banned alcohol from the White House.

== Early life ==
Lucy Ware Webb was born on August 28, 1831, in Chillicothe, Ohio. Her parents were Dr. James Webb and Maria Cook. She had two older brothers who both became medical doctors. Her earliest ancestor in America was Giles Webb, who emigrated to the Americas from England in the early-mid 1600s.

In 1833, Lucy's father went to his family's home in Lexington, Kentucky, to free 15-20 slaves he had inherited from his aunt. There was a cholera epidemic happening at the time and James cared for the sick. Soon James became infected with cholera and died. Friends of Lucy's mother advised the family to sell the slaves rather than free them. Maria responded that she would take in washing to earn money before she would sell a slave.

Maria's father, Isaac Cook, was a temperance advocate and he encouraged young Lucy to sign a pledge to abstain from alcohol.

The Webbs were Methodists.

== Education ==
In 1844, the Webb family moved to Delaware, Ohio. Lucy's brothers enrolled at Ohio Wesleyan University. Although women were not allowed to study at Wesleyan, Lucy was permitted to enroll in the college prep program at the university. A term report signed by the vice-president of Ohio Wesleyan in 1845 noted that her conduct was "unexceptionable" (beyond reproach).

Several months later Lucy transferred to Cincinnati Wesleyan Female College and she graduated from there in 1850. Lucy was unusually well educated for a young lady of her day.

While in college, Lucy wrote essays on social and religious issues. One essay was entitled "Is Traveling on the Sabbath Consistent with Christian Principles?" At her commencement, she read an original essay, "The Influence of Christianity on National Prosperity." Lucy appears to have been influenced by the women's suffrage movement, writing in one essay, "It is acknowledged by most persons that her (woman's) mind is as strong as a man's. ... Instead of being considered the slave of man, she is considered his equal in all things, and his superior in some."

== Marriage ==
Lucy first met Rutherford B. Hayes at Ohio Wesleyan University. At the time, Lucy was fourteen years old and Rutherford was twenty-three. Rutherford's mother was hopeful that the two would find a connection, but at this point Rutherford considered Lucy "not quite old enough to fall in love with."

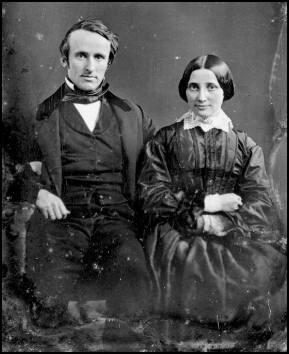
Rutherford and Lucy Hayes on their wedding day: December 30, 1852

In 1850, Rutherford's older sister Fanny Platt encouraged him to visit with Lucy again. That summer Lucy was 19, and she and Rutherford were members of the same wedding party. Rutherford was so taken with Lucy that he gave her the prize (a gold ring) that he had found in the wedding cake.

In 1851, Rutherford wrote in his diary, "I guess I am a great deal in love with L(ucy). ... Her low sweet voice ... her soft rich eyes." Rutherford also praised her intelligence and character, "She sees at a glance what others study upon, but will not, perhaps study what she is unable to see at a flash. She is a genuine woman, right from instinct and impulse rather than judgment and reflection."

After the couple became engaged, Lucy returned the wedding cake ring to Rutherford. He wore that ring for the rest of his life.

Lucy and Rutherford were married at her mother's house in Cincinnati in a simple ceremony on December 30, 1852.

They spent their honeymoon at Fanny's house in Columbus, Ohio, before returning to Cincinnati. In Columbus, Rutherford argued a case before the Ohio Supreme Court while Fanny and Lucy developed a close friendship. The two women attended lectures and concerts together. Lucy and Fanny once went to a lecture by noted suffragette Lucy Stone. Lucy Hayes agreed with Stone that a reform in the wage scale for women was long overdue, and that "violent" methods sometimes served the purpose of calling attention to the need for reforms. Lucy noted that Stone took the position that "whatever is proper for a man to do is equally right for a woman provided she has the power." According to Emily Apt Geer of the Rutherford B. Hayes Presidential Center, "if the influence of the bright and aggressive Fanny Platt had extended over a normal lifetime, Lucy Hayes might have become active in the woman's rights movement." Fanny Platt died in childbirth during the winter of 1856. Lucy named her sixth child and only daughter Fanny in memory of her sister-in-law and friend.

The couple had eight children: Birchard Austin (1853–1926), Webb Cook (1856–1934), Rutherford Platt (1858–1927), Joseph Thompson (1861–1863), George Crook (1864–1866), Fanny (1867–1950), Scott Russell (1871–1923), and Manning Force (1873–1874).

Rutherford had previously thought the abolition of slavery was too radical an action. However, Lucy's anti-slavery sentiments influenced him, and soon after their marriage Rutherford began defending runaway slaves in court who had crossed into Ohio from Kentucky.

After Lincoln's election in 1860, Lucy and Rutherford joined the presidential train from Indianapolis to Cincinnati.

== Civil War ==
When the first news of the firing on Fort Sumter reached Cincinnati, Lucy was in favor of the war. She felt that if she had been at Fort Sumter with a garrison of women, there might not have been a surrender. Her enthusiasm encouraged Rutherford to enlist as a major in the Twenty-third Ohio Volunteer Infantry. As often as she could, Lucy – sometimes with her mother and children – visited Rutherford in the field. She often assisted her brother, Dr. Joe Webb, in caring for the sick.

In September 1862, Rutherford was injured in battle in Middleton, Maryland. Thinking he was hospitalized in Washington due to a paperwork error, Lucy rushed to the nation's capital. She eventually found Hayes in Maryland and after two weeks of convalescence, the Hayeses returned to Ohio, traveling by train with other wounded troops.

After Rutherford returned to his regiment, Lucy became a regular visitor in Rutherford's Army camp. She ministered to the wounded, cheered the homesick, and comforted the dying. She also secured supplies from Northern civilians to better equip the Union soldiers. Lucy was often joined by her mother at camp and her brother Joe was the regiment's surgeon. The men of the 23rd Ohio Volunteer Infantry affectionately nicknamed her "Mother Lucy" for her service. At one point, twenty-year-old William McKinley spent hours tending a campfire because Lucy sat nearby.

The couple's infant son, Joe, died while the family was at an Army camp.

== Congress ==
While Rutherford served in Congress, Lucy joined him in Washington for its winter social season. Lucy regularly sat in the gallery of the House to listen to congressional debates. She often wore a checkered shawl so her husband could spot her.

In 1866, the Hayeses and other congressional couples visited the scene of race riots in Memphis and New Orleans to see the damage that had been done.

Lucy also worked for the welfare of children and veterans. The couple's nearly two-year-old son George died during this period.

== First Lady of Ohio ==
While Rutherford was Governor of Ohio, Lucy often accompanied her husband on visits to prisons, correctional institutions for boys and girls, hospitals for the mentally ill, and facilities for the deaf and mute.

In 1870, Lucy and her friends established a soldiers' orphans home in Xenia, Ohio.

Rutherford initially chose not to run for a third term as governor and in 1873, the family moved to Spiegel Grove. Rutherford's uncle, Sardis Birchard, had built the house years earlier with them in mind. This house would later become one of the first presidential libraries.

In 1875, Rutherford ran for and won a third term as governor. The hard fought victory brought Rutherford to national prominence. In June 1876, he was nominated for president by the Republican party.

Lucy played an active role in her husband's administration and lobbied the state legislature to provide more funding to schools, orphanages, and insane asylums.

Their youngest child, named for General Manning F. Force, was born in 1873 and died in 1874, while the Hayes family lived at Spiegel Grove.

== First Lady of the United States ==
The presidential election of 1876 was one of the most controversial in the country's history. Hayes was not declared the winner until March 1, 1877, five months after Election Day. The declaration was so delayed that the Hayes family boarded a train to Washington without being sure if Rutherford was the president elect. The next morning, March 2, they were awakened near Harrisburg to receive the news that Congress had finally declared Hayes President of the United States.

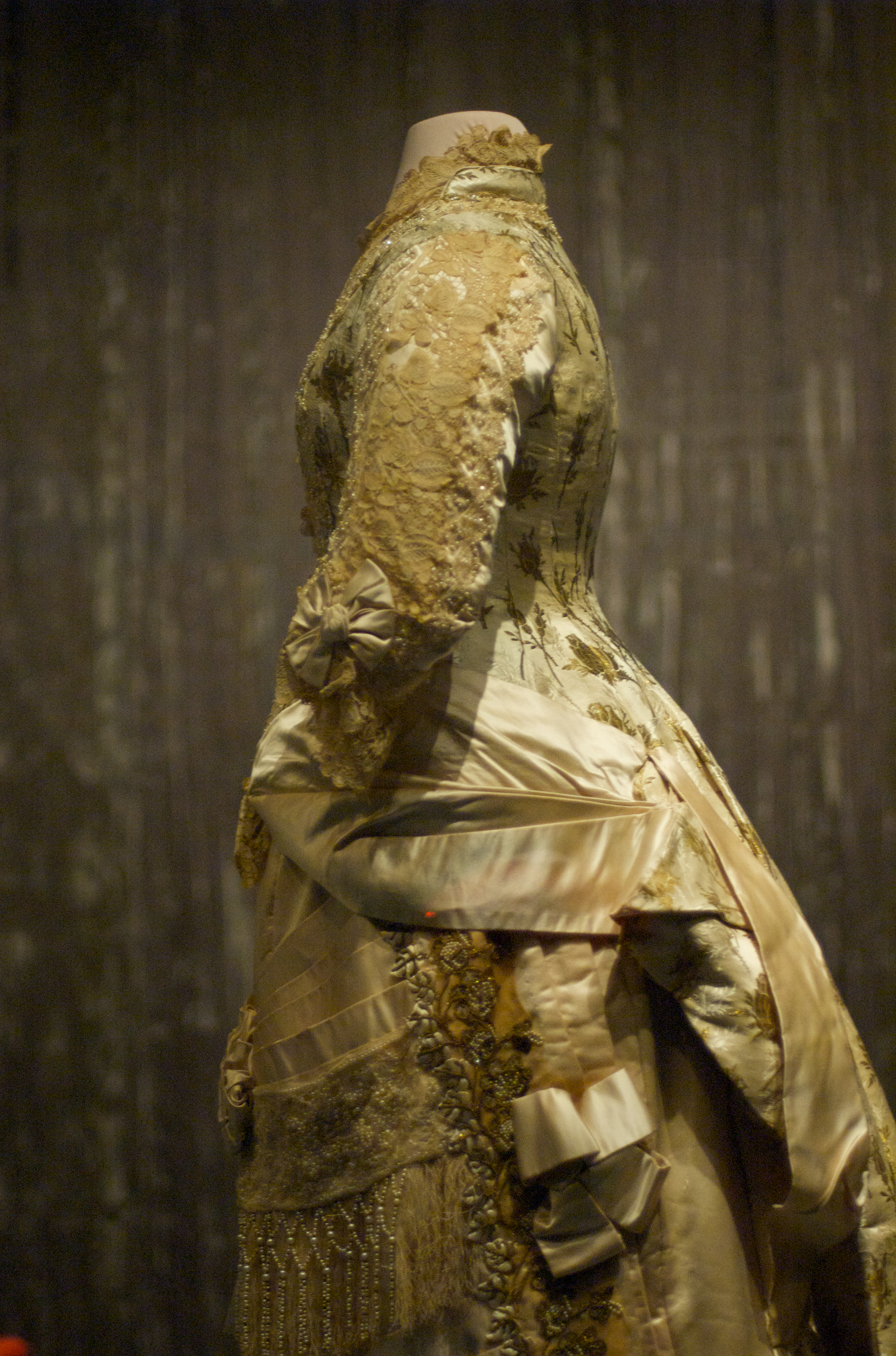
Lucy Hayes's Reception Gown, Smithsonian National Museum of American History

In the early days of Rutherford's administration, the North's military occupation of the South and the Reconstruction era came to an end.

Restoration funds for the White House were unavailable when they first moved in, so Lucy retrieved old furniture from the attic and rearranged things to hide the holes in the carpets and drapes. According to executive assistant William Cook, "any really good things owed their preservation to this energetic lady."

By the time of Rutherford's inauguration, the position of First Lady was an increasingly prominent one. There were growing numbers of female journalists in the late nineteenth century. Female reporters devoted much of their time and energy to covering the most visible woman in America: the First Lady. The attention began after Rutherford's inauguration, with the New York Herald writing "Mrs. Hayes is a most attractive and lovable woman. She is the life and soul of every party ... For the mother of so many children she looks ... youthful."

Lucy Hayes was the first wife of a President to be widely referred to as the First Lady by the press, when Mary C. Ames referred to the "First Lady" in a newspaper column about the inauguration. Advances in printing technology meant that a wide audience saw sketches of the new First Lady from the 1877 inauguration.

At this time it was not the custom for a president's wife to have a staff of social assistants and, unlike some previous First Ladies, Lucy had no adult daughters to help shoulder the workload. Lucy depended on nieces, cousins, and daughters of friends to help with social events, and these young ladies also helped enliven the Hayes White House.

Lucy was fond of animals. A cat, a bird, two dogs, and a goat joined the Hayes family in residence at the White House.

In 1879, The Washington Post described Lucy's dress at the White House New Year's Reception, "The dress of Mrs. Hayes was at once simple and elegant ... With accustomed good taste she wore no jewelry, and the white plume in her black hair fell gracefully in drooping folds."

At the first official state dinner on April 19, 1877, to honor Russian Grand Duke Alexis and Grand Duke Constantine, a "full quota" of wine was served. But soon after this, President Hayes made it known that there would be no more alcoholic beverages served at future White House functions. The six wine glasses laid out at each place setting had angered temperance advocates and Rutherford believed the Republican Party needed the temperance vote. The decision was Rutherford's, although Lucy may have influenced him. Although the Hayes family were generally teetotal, they had previously served alcoholic beverages to guests at their home in Ohio. But because Lucy was a known teetotaler (Hayes sometimes had a "schoppen" of beer when he visited Cincinnati) she was blamed for the dry White House. Regardless of her teetotaler status however, along with her husband they privately opposed Prohibition. They believed controlling alcohol consumption through education and example rather than force was more effective. Yet Hayes understood the political power becoming a teetotaler gave him by ensuring dry Republicans stayed within the party. He believed this stance on alcohol would only effect them at the White House and could still enjoy in private. This political move earned them more attention than they had originally thought. As a mother herself, Lucy stood as a key figure in the temperance movement as setting an example for how women could set moral examples for their families. She understood the power her role possessed and announced to the public that, "I have young sons who have never tasted liquor, they shall not receive from my hand, or with the sanction that its use in the family would give, the first taste of what might prove their ruin. What I wish for my own sons I must do for the sons of other mothers." Later, when President Garfield brought alcohol back to the White House, the Hayeses predicted it would cause a split within the Republican Party.

In general, Lucy had a more casual style that was reflected in the receptions she held during Washington's winter social season. During the holidays, she invited staff members and their families to Thanksgiving dinner and opened presents with them on Christmas morning. The White House telegraph operator and secretaries were included in the Thanksgiving group. The group was so large it took three turkeys and a roast pig to feed them all. Lucy was generally kind towards the White House staff, she also allowed White House servants to take time off to attend school.

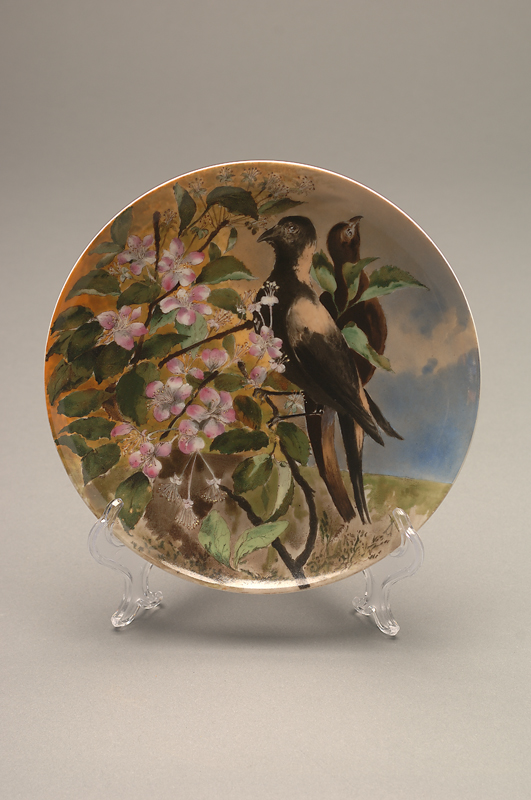
Hayes presidential china dinner plate, 1877

On December 31, 1877, Rutherford and Lucy celebrated their silver wedding anniversary in the White House.

The most significant change made to the White House during the Hayes Administration were the installation of bathrooms with running water and the addition of a crude wall telephone. Lucy was the first First Lady to use a typewriter, a telephone, and a phonograph while in office, and was also the first to enjoy a permanent system of running water in the White House.

Lucy preferred to enlarge the greenhouse conservatories rather than to undertake extensive redecoration of the White House. The billiard-room, which connected the house with the conservatories, was converted into an attractive greenhouse and the billiard table consigned to the basement. Shuttered windows in the State Dining Room could be opened for dinner guests to look into the conservatories. Some Americans considered the billiard table as either a gambling device or a rich man's toy, and the Hayes were glad to get it out of sight.

Every day, flowers were brought in from the greenhouses to decorate the White House. Additional bouquets were sent to friends and Washington hospitals. Greenhouse upkeep made up one fourth of the White House's household expenditures under Hayes.

Looking to celebrate American flora and fauna, Lucy commissioned Theodore R. Davis to design new china for the White House. After using the pieces, Washington hostess Clover Adams complained that it was hard to eat soup calmly with a coyote springing from behind a pine tree in the bowl.

Music was important to Lucy and she held informal "sings" upstairs in the family quarters. Lucy sang and played the guitar, and was assisted by the talents of friends and family. At times, Secretary of the Interior Carl Schurz played the piano while Vice President William A. Wheeler, Secretary of the Treasury John Sherman, and his brother, Gen. William T. Sherman, joined in singing gospel songs.

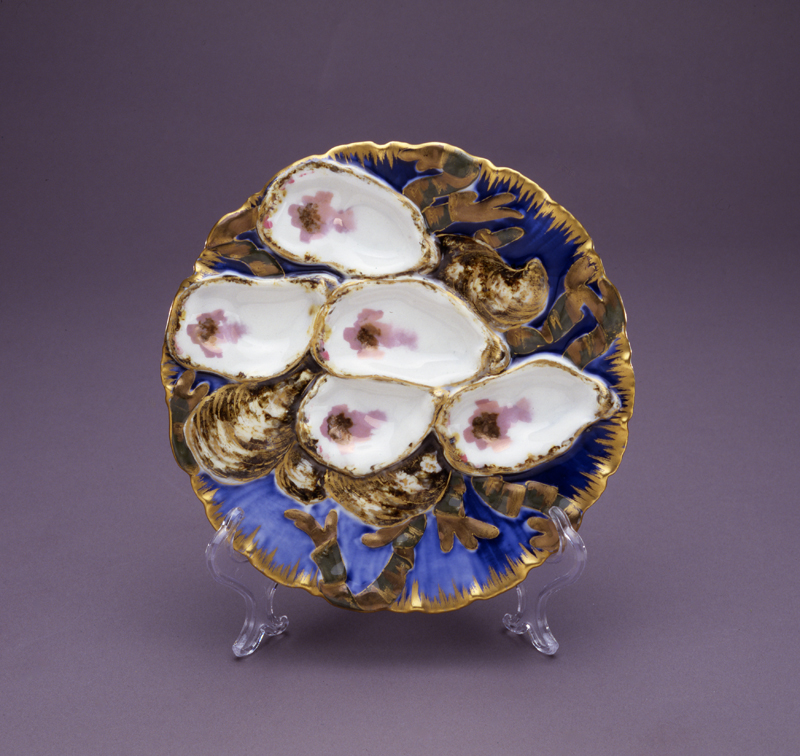
Hayes presidential china oyster plate, 1877

Lucy frequently accompanied her husband on trips around the country. Rutherford travelled so much that the Chicago Tribune nicknamed him "Rutherford the Rover." In 1877, The couple undertook a tour of the South in hopes of improving national unity. The Richmond Dispatch reported that Lucy "won the admiration of people where she has been."

In 1878, Lucy toured Philadelphia without her husband. She visited the Academy of Fine Arts, Philadelphia School of Design for Women, and the Woman's Medical College, as well as several schools and orphanages. This was the first documented instance of a First Lady following a public schedule independent of the President.

In 1880, Lucy was the first presidential spouse to visit the West Coast while her husband was President. While on their Western tour, Lucy and Rutherford met with Sarah Winnemucca. Lucy was moved to tears by Winnemucca's impassioned speech for Native American lands.

Lucy's compassion and sincerity endeared her to Washingtonians. She regularly visited the National Deaf Mute College (today Gallaudet University) and the Hampton Institute, where she sponsored a scholarship for a student. She continued to show concern for the poor by contributing generously to Washington charities. In January 1880 alone, Lucy and Rutherford gave $990 (~$27,544 in 2024) to help the poor in Washington.

However, Lucy rejected pleas from groups requesting her public support, committing herself instead to serving as a moral example to the nation. Rutherford once commented, "I don't know how much influence Mrs. Hayes has with Congress, but she has great influence with me."

As First Lady, Lucy advocated for the completion of the Washington Monument.

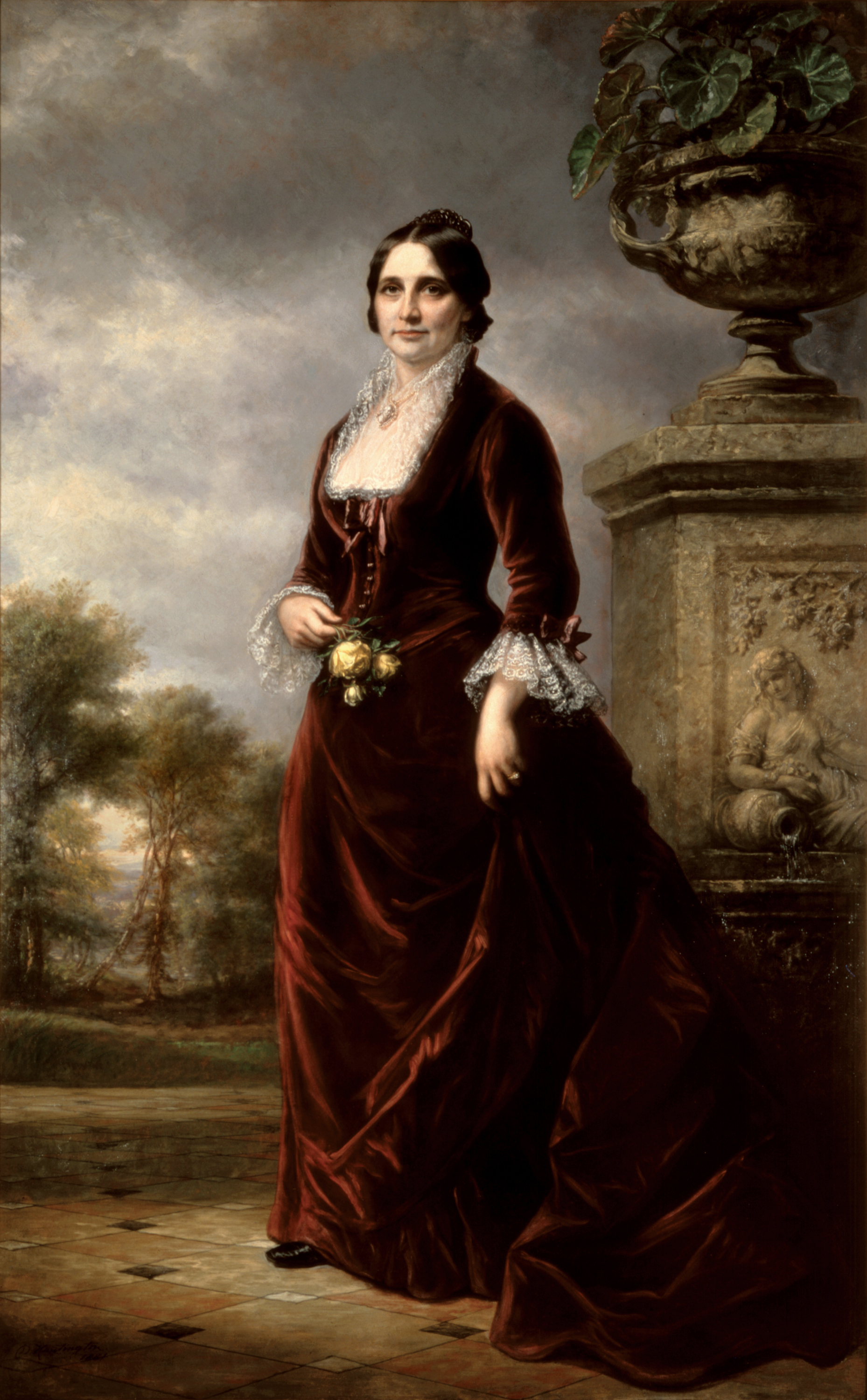
Official portrait of First Lady Lucy Webb Hayes, Daniel Huntington, 1881. The Woman's Christian Temperance Union paid for this portrait.

When the children of Washington were banned from rolling their Easter eggs on the Capitol grounds, they were invited to use the White House lawn on the Monday following Easter, beginning the enduring tradition of the White House Easter Egg Roll.

Lucy was a friend to other First Ladies. During her tenure as First Lady, Lucy visited with Sarah Polk and journeyed to Martha Washington's Mount Vernon and Dolley Madison's Montpelier. She asked Julia Tyler to help officiate at a White House reception and was friendly with former First Lady Julia Grant. She was also friendly with future First Ladies including Lucretia Garfield, Ida McKinley, and Helen Herron Taft.

When portraits of past presidents were commissioned for the White House, Lucy insisted that paintings of both Martha Washington and Dolley Madison also grace the walls of the presidential mansion. Lucy's own official portrait by Daniel Huntington was commissioned by the Woman's Christian Temperance Union.

On his 48th birthday, Rutherford wrote to Lucy, "My life with you has been so happy—so successful—so beyond reasonable anticipations, that I think of you with a loving gratitude that I do not know how to express."

Rutherford kept his promise to serve only one term, the Hayes family returned to their Fremont, Ohio, home, Spiegel Grove, in 1881.

== Views on race ==
Lucy Hayes was an advocate for African Americans both before and after the Civil War. She remained in contact with her family's former slaves, and employed some. Winnie Monroe, a former slave freed by Lucy's mother Maria, eventually moved to the White House with the Hayes family as a cook and nurse. Later, Lucy would encourage Winnie's daughter Mary Monroe to attend Oberlin.

The Hayes were so known for their sympathy towards African Americans that a month after they returned to Cincinnati from Columbus, a black baby was left on their doorstep.

In 1861, Lucy wrote to her husband, "if a contraband [runaway slave] is in Camp— don't let the 23rd Regiment be disgraced by returning [him or her]."

As First Lady, Lucy invited African-American performers to the White House. In 1878, Marie Selika Williams (1849–1937), also known as Madame Selika, appeared at the White House. Introduced by Frederick Douglass, Madame Selika was the first African-American professional musician to appear at the White House.

== Views on temperance ==
Known as a teetotaler, Lucy had signed a pledge to abstain from alcohol at a young age.

The White House had a ban on alcoholic beverages during Rutherford's term, but historians generally credit Rutherford with the final decision to ban alcohol. Lucy actually opposed prohibition. She preferred to persuade rather than prevent and did not condemn those who used alcohol in moderation.

Lucy was not a member of any temperance groups. She resisted attempts by the Woman's Christian Temperance Union (WCTU) to enlist her as a leader out of fear of creating political fallout for her husband by association with the controversial cause.

The WCTU paid for a portrait of Lucy by Daniel Huntington before she left the White House.

The first written references to "Lemonade Lucy" don't turn up until the 20th century, which didn't begin until 11 years after Lucy's death in 1889, according to Tom Culbertson of the Hayes Center. Hundreds of articles, cartoons, and poems chronicled and parodied her opposition to drinking. Historian Carl Anthony "suggests a reason the legend of Lemonade Lucy might have become so popular with historians of the early 20th century, when there was greater moral stigma associated with alcohol consumption".

== Views on suffrage ==
As a young woman, Lucy expressed opinions that suggested she was pro-suffrage, but she did not join any of the prominent suffrage groups of the day. Two of Lucy's aunts were involved in the suffrage movement.

Many historians believe that had her sister-in-law Fanny Platt lived longer, Lucy would have become a committed advocate for women's suffrage.

== Later life ==
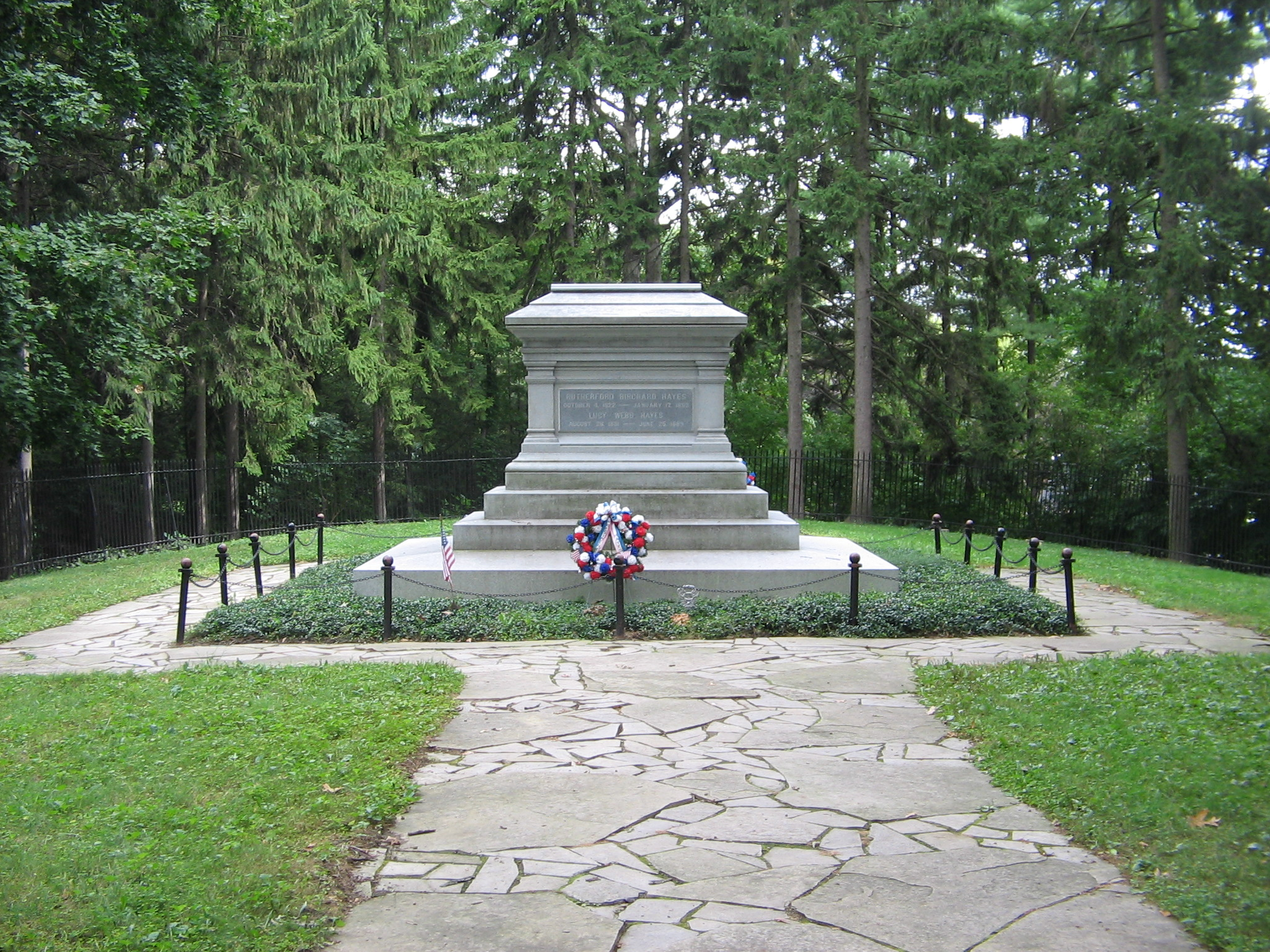
Grave of Rutherford B. and Lucy Webb Hayes at Spiegel Grove, their home in Fremont, Ohio, United States. The property has been declared a National Historic Landmark.

Back in Ohio after leaving the White House, Lucy joined the Woman's Relief Corps (founded 1883), taught a Sunday School class, attended reunions of the 23rd Ohio Volunteer Infantry, and entertained distinguished visitors to Spiegel Grove. Lucy also became national president of the newly formed Woman's Home Missionary Society of the Methodist Church. As president, she called attention to the plight of the urban poor and disenfranchised African-Americans in the South. She also spoke out against Mormon polygamy. However, when asked by Susan B. Anthony to send delegates from the Home Missionary Society to a meeting of the International Council of Women, Lucy declined.

Hayes spent her last eight years at Spiegel Grove. A few days after suffering a stroke, she died, at age 57, on June 25, 1889. Flags across the country were flown at half-mast in her honor.

Rutherford died three and a half years later and was buried beside his wife. In 1915, their remains were moved to Spiegel Grove. Below them their dog Gryme and two horses named Old Whitey and Old Ned are buried also.

== Legacy ==
Lucy Hayes served as First Lady during an important transitional era in nineteenth-century American history. Major economic trends of the 1870s included the rise of national businesses, shifts in centers of agriculture, and the development of a favorable balance of trade for the United States. The accelerated movement of people from rural to urban areas also brought about great alterations in social life.

Emily Apt Geer explained,

A twentieth century feminist might regret that Lucy Hayes did not support woman suffrage, but this would have been contrary to her social code and her concept of the role of a political wife. The example, however, that Lucy Hayes set for the nation as a hostess and homemaker, the adoration and respect accorded her by her family, her efforts to help other people, her sincere interest in politics, and the extent of her education, promised well for the future status of women in the American social and intellectual structure.

Spiegel Grove is operated by the Ohio History Connection and is open to the public.

Hayes is honored with a life-size bronze sculpture inside the Cuyahoga County Soldiers' and Sailors' Monument in Cleveland, Ohio.

== See also ==
- Bibliography of United States presidential spouses and first ladies
- Bibliography of Rutherford B. Hayes

Honorary titles
Preceded by Helen Cox; Margaret Noyes	First Lady of Ohio; 1868–1872; 1876–1877	Succeeded by Margaret Noyes; Sarah Young
Preceded by Julia Grant	First Lady of the United States; 1877–1881	Succeeded by Lucretia Garfield
