= Glen Alpine, North Carolina =

- Town
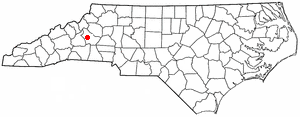
- Location of Glen Alpine, North Carolina
- Coordinates: 35°43′51″N 81°46′57″W
- Country: United States
- State: North Carolina
- County: Burke
- Incorporated: 1883

Area
  - Total: 2.15 sq mi (5.56 km^{2})
  - Land: 2.15 sq mi (5.56 km^{2})
  - Water: 0 sq mi (0.00 km^{2})
- Elevation: 1,188 ft (362 m)

Population (2020)
  - Total: 1,529
  - Density: 712.2/sq mi (274.98/km^{2})
- Time zone: UTC-5 (Eastern (EST))
  - Summer (DST): UTC-4 (EDT)
- ZIP code: 28628
- Area code: 828
- FIPS code: 37-26200
- GNIS feature ID: 2406575
- Website: www.townofglenalpine.org

Glen Alpine (/ˈɡlɛn ˈælpən/ GLEN AL-pən) is a town in Burke County, North Carolina, United States. As of the 2020 census, Glen Alpine had a population of 1,529. It is part of the Hickory–Lenoir–Morganton Metropolitan Statistical Area.

== Geography ==
Glen Alpine is located in western Burke County. It is bordered to the southeast by an extension of the city of Morganton. U.S. Route 70 passes through the town as Main Street, and Interstate 40 passes to the south of the town, with access from exits 98 and 100. Via US-70, it is 5 miles (8 km) east to downtown Morganton and 15 miles (24 km) west to Marion.

According to the United States Census Bureau, the town of Glen Alpine has a total area of 2.2 square miles (5.6 km^{2}), all land.

== Demographics ==
Historical population
Census	Pop.	Note	%±
1890	252		—
1900	137		−45.6%
1910	308		124.8%
1920	346		12.3%
1930	529		52.9%
1940	665		25.7%
1950	695		4.5%
1960	734		5.6%
1970	797		8.6%
1980	645		−19.1%
1990	563		−12.7%
2000	1,090		93.6%
2010	1,517		39.2%
2020	1,529		0.8%
U.S. Decennial Census

=== 2020 census ===
As of the 2020 census, Glen Alpine had a population of 1,529. The median age was 43.0 years. 21.0% of residents were under the age of 18 and 19.6% of residents were 65 years of age or older. For every 100 females there were 97.3 males, and for every 100 females age 18 and over there were 92.4 males age 18 and over.

79.3% of residents lived in urban areas, while 20.7% lived in rural areas.

There were 606 households in Glen Alpine, of which 31.5% had children under the age of 18 living in them. Of all households, 54.1% were married-couple households, 14.5% were households with a male householder and no spouse or partner present, and 24.4% were households with a female householder and no spouse or partner present. About 22.9% of all households were made up of individuals and 10.2% had someone living alone who was 65 years of age or older.

There were 678 housing units, of which 10.6% were vacant. The homeowner vacancy rate was 1.8% and the rental vacancy rate was 7.2%.

Glen Alpine racial composition
Race	Number	Percentage
White (non-Hispanic)	1,259	82.34%
Black or African American (non-Hispanic)	61	3.99%
Native American	7	0.46%
Asian	72	4.71%
Other/Mixed	59	3.86%
Hispanic or Latino	71	4.64%

=== 2000 census ===
As of the census of 2000, there were 1,090 people, 423 households, and 307 families residing in the town. The population density was 588.0 inhabitants per square mile (227.0/km^{2}). There were 443 housing units at an average density of 239.0 per square mile (92.3/km^{2}). The racial makeup of the town was 81.28% White, 3.85% African American, 0.37% Native American, 13.49% Asian, 0.64% from other races, and 0.37% from two or more races. Hispanic or Latino of any race were 0.73% of the population.

There were 423 households, out of which 29.3% had children under the age of 18 living with them, 58.6% were married couples living together, 9.2% had a female householder with no husband present, and 27.2% were non-families. 24.1% of all households were made up of individuals, and 11.3% had someone living alone who was 65 years of age or older. The average household size was 2.57 and the average family size was 3.05.

In the town, the population was spread out, with 25.4% under the age of 18, 7.9% from 18 to 24, 23.9% from 25 to 44, 27.1% from 45 to 64, and 15.7% who were 65 years of age or older. The median age was 39 years. For every 100 females, there were 95.3 males. For every 100 females age 18 and over, there were 90.8 males.

The median income for a household in the town was $36,397, and the median income for a family was $44,167. Males had a median income of $27,917 versus $21,679 for females. The per capita income for the town was $14,506. About 4.3% of families and 5.2% of the population were below the poverty line, including 5.8% of those under age 18 and 10.5% of those age 65 or over.

== Notable people ==
- Edward W. Pearson Sr., businessman and residential developer
- Daniel R. Simpson, jurist and legislator
