= Webb Hayes =

American Medal of Honor recipient (1856–1934)

James Webb Cook Hayes
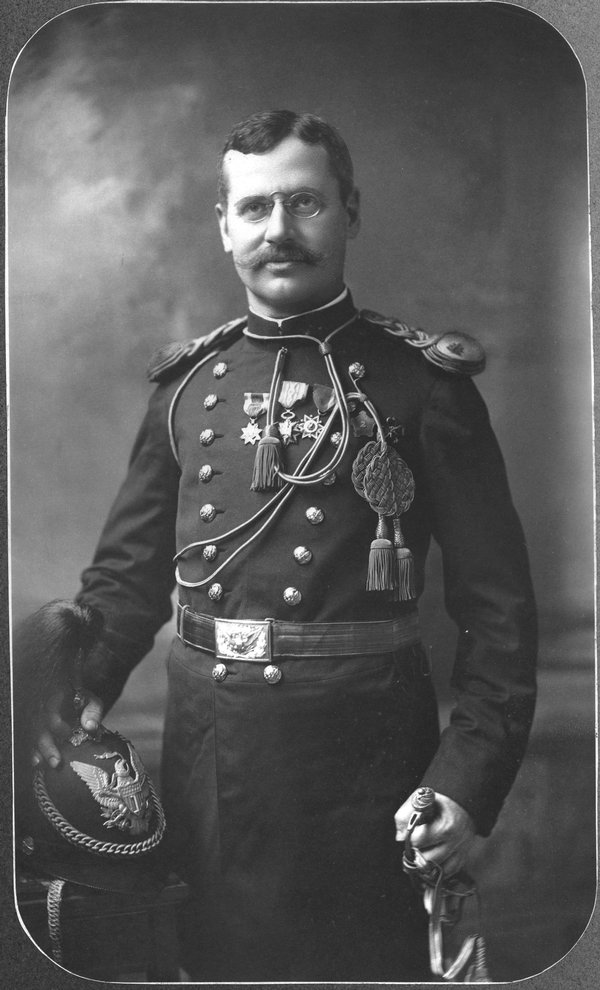
- Hayes in 1920

Private Secretary to the President
- In office March 4, 1877 – March 4, 1881
- President: Rutherford B. Hayes
- Preceded by: Ulysses S. Grant Jr.
- Succeeded by: Joseph Stanley-Brown

Personal details
- Born: James Webb Cook Hayes; March 20, 1856 Cincinnati, Ohio, US
- Died: July 26, 1934 (aged 78) Marion, Ohio, US
- Resting place: Spiegel Grove State Memorial; Fremont, Ohio
- Awards: Medal of Honor

Military service
- Allegiance: United States
- Branch/service: Ohio National Guard; United States Army
- Years of service: 1898–1918
- Rank: Brigadier General
- Unit: 1st Ohio Cavalry; Fifth Army Corps; 31st Volunteer Infantry
- Battles/wars: Spanish–American War; San Juan Hill; Boxer Rebellion; Russo-Japanese War; World War I

James Webb Cook Hayes (March 20, 1856 – July 26, 1934) was an American businessman and soldier. He co-founded a forerunner of Union Carbide, served in three wars, and received the Medal of Honor.

== Early years and family ==
James Webb Cook Hayes was the second son of President Rutherford B. Hayes and Lucy Webb Hayes.

With his father serving in the American Civil War from the time James was five years old, he spent six months every winter at his father's encampment, which was usually Camp White, West Virginia. He became very close with the commander of the unit, General George Crook, who later became his godfather. Crook taught him how to live off the land, including hunting, fishing and survival. Years later, after Crook became famous in the west as a hunter and Indian fighter, the two made annual trips into the Rocky Mountains for a hunt of big game.

== College and career ==
Hayes's Cornell University yearbook photo, 1876

Hayes attended Cornell University from 1873 to 1875 and was a member of Delta Kappa Epsilon. He left Cornell to work as his father's secretary when his father was the governor of Ohio. When his father was elected president, he again served as his father's secretary.

In 1881, Hayes moved to Cleveland to work as the treasurer of the Whipple Manufacturing Company. In 1886, he, with three others, founded the National Carbon Company, which is now known as Union Carbide. Hayes stayed with this company for many years as the vice president.

He was the principal proponent for founding the Rutherford B. Hayes Presidential Center, the first presidential library. It was established in 1916 at Spiegel Grove.

Hayes died on July 26, 1934, in Marion, Ohio, and was buried with his parents at Spiegel Grove, the family estate in Fremont, Ohio.

== Military service ==
Hayes also served in the military in the Spanish–American War, Philippine–American War and First World War. He was a member of the First Cleveland Troop, later known as Troop A of the Ohio National Guard. During the Spanish–American War, he was appointed a major in the First Ohio Cavalry. He fought in Santiago de Cuba Campaign, during which he was wounded during the crossing of the San Juan River and the assault on San Juan Hill, and later in the invasion of Puerto Rico.

Following this, he was promoted to lieutenant colonel, reassigned to the 31st United States Volunteer Infantry, and sent to the Philippines. Just hours after landing there, he led a rescue party to free captured men at Vigan Island. He received the Medal of Honor for this action. He went on to participate in the China Relief Expedition during the Boxer Rebellion and as an observer in the Russo-Japanese War.

During World War I, Hayes was promoted to colonel and first served as a special agent for the State Department in France and later held an administrative assignment on the Italian front. After the war he was promoted to brigadier general.

Hayes was a member of the Ohio Commandery of the Military Order of the Loyal Legion of the United States by right of the service of his uncle, Lieutenant Colonel J.T. Webb, as an officer in the Union Army during the American Civil War. He was also a member of the Military Order of Foreign Wars.

Hayes was one of two sons of Presidents of the United States to be awarded the Medal of Honor, the other being Theodore Roosevelt Jr..

== Medal of Honor citation ==
Rank and organization: Lieutenant Colonel, 31st Infantry, U.S. Volunteers. Place and date: At Vigan, Luzon, Philippine Islands, December 4, 1899. Entered service at: Fremont, Ohio. Born: March 20, 1856, Cincinnati, Ohio. Date of issue: December 17, 1902.

Citation:

Pushed through the enemy's lines alone, during the night, from the beach to the beleaguered force at Vigan, and returned the following morning to report the condition of affairs to the Navy and secure assistance.

== Military Awards ==

1st row	Medal of Honor		Spanish Campaign Medal
2nd row	Philippine Campaign Medal	China Campaign Medal	World War I Victory Medal

== See also ==
- List of Medal of Honor recipients
