= Daniel R. Simpson =

American politician

Daniel Reid Simpson (February 20, 1927 – January 24, 2015) was an American jurist and politician.

Born in Glen Alpine, North Carolina, Simpson served in the United States Army on the Pacific Front during World War II. He received his bachelor's and law degrees from Wake Forest University. Simpson practiced law and served on the Glen Alpine City Council and as mayor and was a Republican. He also served as judge of the Burke County, North Carolina Criminal Court. Simpson served in the North Carolina House of Representatives in 1957, 1961, and 1963. Simpson then served in the North Carolina State Senate from 1985 to 1995.

After his retirement from political life, Simpson's home town of Glen Alpine named their baseball field "Simpson Field", in his honor.
