= Marie Selika Williams =

American opera singer (c. 1849–1937)

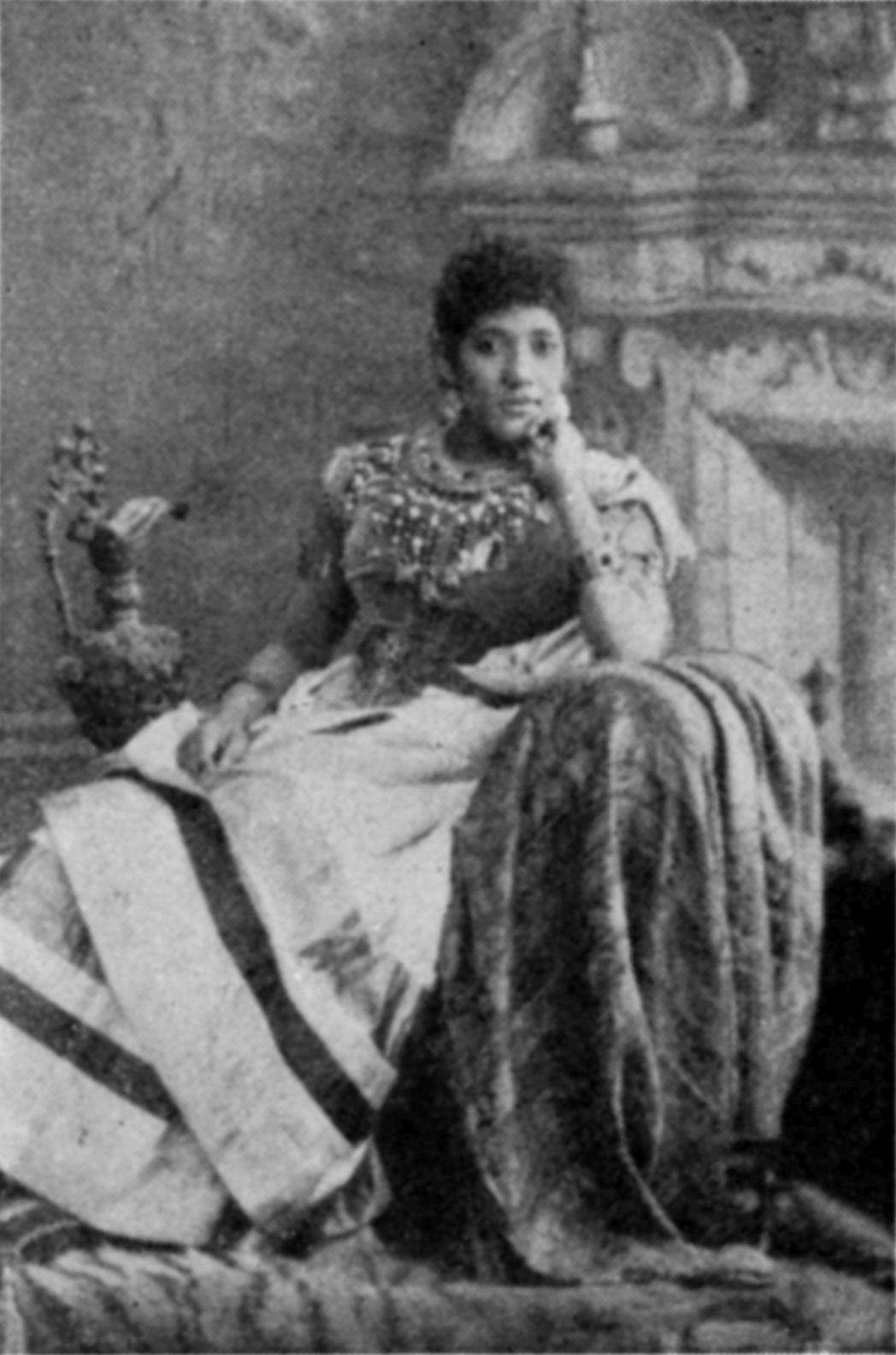
Madame Selika as photographed by Maud Cuney Hare

Marie Selika Williams (c. 1849 – May 19, 1937) was an American coloratura soprano. She was the first Black artist to perform in the White House.

== Biography ==
She was born Marie Smith in Natchez, Mississippi, around 1849. After she was born, her family moved to Cincinnati, where a wealthy white family funded voice lessons for her. She moved to San Francisco in the 1870s and studied with Signora G. Bianchi. She then studied in Chicago with Antonio Farini, who taught the Italian method. There she met a fellow student, operatic baritone Sampson Williams, whom she would later marry. Between 1878 and 1879, she was scouted by an audience member named Mrs. Francis Bailey Gaskin of San Francisco, who encouraged her to study in Boston. Williams went on to study German, French, and Italian in Boston while residing in the home of Mrs. Gaskin's mother.

While in Boston, Williams took up the stage name "Selika" or "Madame Selika" after the character in Giacomo Meyerbeer's opera L'Africaine. Williams, like Sissieretta Jones, would even perform in the costume of Meyerbeer's "Selika", an African queen. Due to her rendition of E. W. Mulder's "Polka Staccato", she was often called the "Queen of Staccato". Frederick G. Carnes' "Selika – Grand Vocal Waltz of Magic", composed exclusively for her, further showcases her talents, ranging from B3 to C6. Other praise for Williams have come from platforms such as The Paris Figaro, Berlin’s The Tagblatt, and Noted Negro Women.

In 1878, Williams became the first black artist to perform in the White House. On November 13, she sang for President Rutherford B. Hayes and First Lady Lucy Webb Hayes in the Green Room and was introduced by Marshall Fred Douglass. She also performed at Philadelphia's Academy of Music in 1878 and at New York's Steinway Hall in 1879. From 1882 to 1885, she performed across Europe with her husband, giving a concert in St James's Hall, London, for Queen Victoria in 1883. While in London, she was featured in a benefit concert with Carlotta Patti and Signor Vergora. She went on to perform at the Musée du Nord in Brussels and joined a production of Weber's Der Freischütz in Germany.

In March of 1883, The New York Globe reported that Marie Selika's husband, Sampson Williams, noted the beauty of Berlin and the respect they felt regardless of their race. He also exclaimed that America had much to learn from the city. Similarly, other African American performers struggled with the racism of the United States, and multiple singers would go to Europe in search of more progressive audiences before the rise of Nazi aggression. While Marie Selika likely benefited from her lighter skin and looser hair texture, she was still boxed in by comments such as the "greatest female singer the race has ever produced, with one possible exception--the incomparable Marian Anderson" from Harry Freeman of the Indianapolis Freeman. Critics have also suggested that her insistence on performing with her husband, who many have noted to have lesser abilities, also diminished her opportunities.

Around 1885, Williams went under the management of Lieutenant William Dupree and performed many concerts, including a program with Harry T Burleigh and Will Marion Cook in 1886. Within a couple of years, she went on to be managed by James Monroe Trotter. On February 8, 1886, several performers hosted a Benefit Concert, including Williams, Nellie Brown Mitchell, Edna Brown, and Carrie Melvin at the Charles Street African Methodist Episcopal Church. The following year, on January 4, 1887, Williams participated in another benefit at the same church.

From 1885 to 1891, Williams toured the United States with her husband, who took the stage name "Signor Velosko (the Hawaiian tenor)". They toured Europe a second time and performed at the 1893 World's Columbian Exposition before settling in Cleveland, Ohio, where she opened a voice studio. Marie joined fellow Black singers Flora Batson and Sissieretta Jones for a performance at Carnegie Hall in New York on October 12, 1896.

After her husband died in 1911, Williams gave private lessons and taught at the Martin-Smith Music School in New York City. Her last performance was at the New Star Casino, led by Irwin Martin, director of the Music School Settlement for Colored People in the City of New York, alongside Irwin Martin’s students, students from the Riverdale Colored Orphan Asylum Chorus, and Marian Anderson. She died on May 19, 1937.
