= Fort Stephenson =

Early American fort in Ohio

- Fremont, Ohio
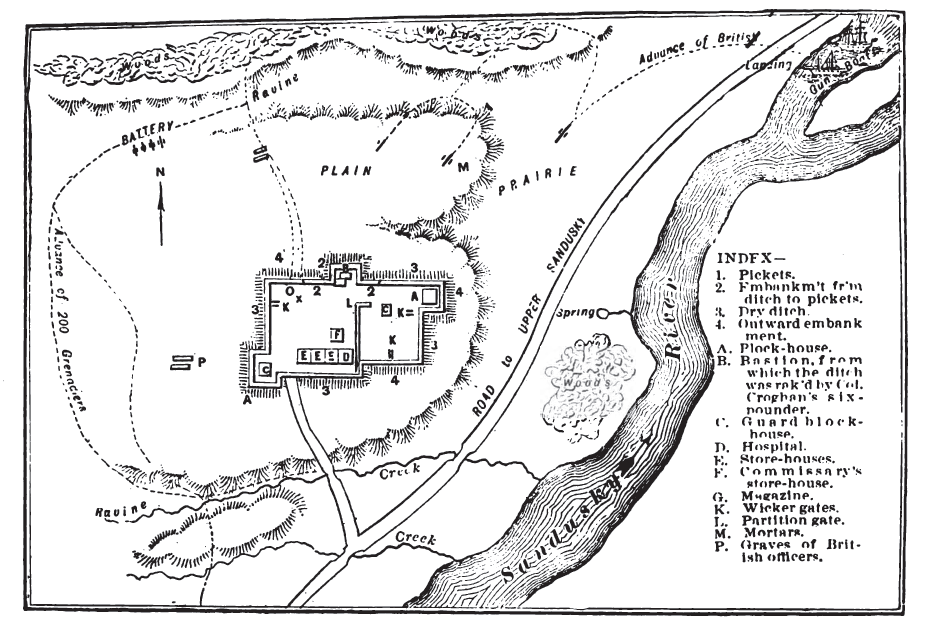
- "Plan of Fort Stephenson" from the History of Ohio: the Rise and Progress of an American State.

Site information
- Type: Fort
- Controlled by: United States

Location
- Coordinates: 41°20′46″N 83°6′55″W

Site history
- Built: 1812
- In use: 1812-1815

Garrison information
- Past commanders: Lieutenant Colonel Miles Stephenson; Major George Croghan

Fort Stephenson was a military installation built in 1812 on the west side of the Sandusky River in northwestern Ohio. Rebuilt in 1813, the fort was the location of the American victory at the Battle of Fort Stephenson in August 1813 during the War of 1812.

== History ==
In the late spring of 1812, shortly before the United States declared war on the United Kingdom, a stockade and blockhouse were constructed on the west side of the Sandusky River about 15 miles (24 km) upstream from Sandusky Bay in what is now Fremont, Ohio. The fort, referred to as Fort Sandusky, was situated on a hill overlooking the river near a trading post. The fort was built close to where the Wyandot village of Junquindundeh had stood during the 18th century.

Fort Sandusky was abandoned after Detroit was captured by British and Indigenous forces on August 16, 1812. Shortly afterwards, the fort and trading post were burned to the ground by some of Britain's Indigenous allies.

In preparation for a campaign to retake Detroit and advance into Upper Canada, Major General William Henry Harrison ordered the construction of several forts in northwestern Ohio including Fort Meigs and Fort Stephenson. Captain Eleazer D. Wood of the Army Corps of Engineers oversaw the reconstruction and expansion of Fort Sandusky by Ohio militia commanded by Lieutenant Colonel Miles Stephenson.

The rebuilt fort, now known as Fort Stephenson, was rectangular in shape and about one acre (0.42 ha) in size. A 10 foot (3.0 m) palisade was erected atop a earth embankment and connected two blockhouses. The fort served as both a supply depot and a staging area, and protected Harrison's supply depots further upriver.

On July 15, 1813, Harrison appointed Major George Croghan as the fort's commander. Seven officers and 160 men, mostly from the 17th Infantry, formed the garrison. Croghan immediately began construction of a 6 foot (1.8 m) deep ditch around the fort.

On August 1, 1813, Major General Henry Procter with 500 British soldiers and a few hundred Indigenous allies began a siege of Fort Stephenson. Over the course of two days, the severely outnumbered garrison repelled all attacks with musket fire and a single cannon dubbed "Old Betsy." An attempt to breach the wall on the afternoon of the August 2 resulted in 96 British casualties, after which Procter withdrew back to Upper Canada.

In September 1813, the fort served as a staging area for Harrison's campaign to retake Detroit and advance into Upper Canada. Some of the prisoners taken at the Battle of Lake Erie on September 10, and the Battle of the Thames on October 5, were temporarily housed at Fort Stevenson before being marched to Frankfort in Kentucky.

The United States Army withdrew from the fort after the war. Settlers soon established the village of Lower Sandusky in the immediate vicinity. The blockhouses were sold and dismantled in 1818, while the newly arrived inhabitants helped themselves to the logs that had formed the palisade.

=== Legacy ===
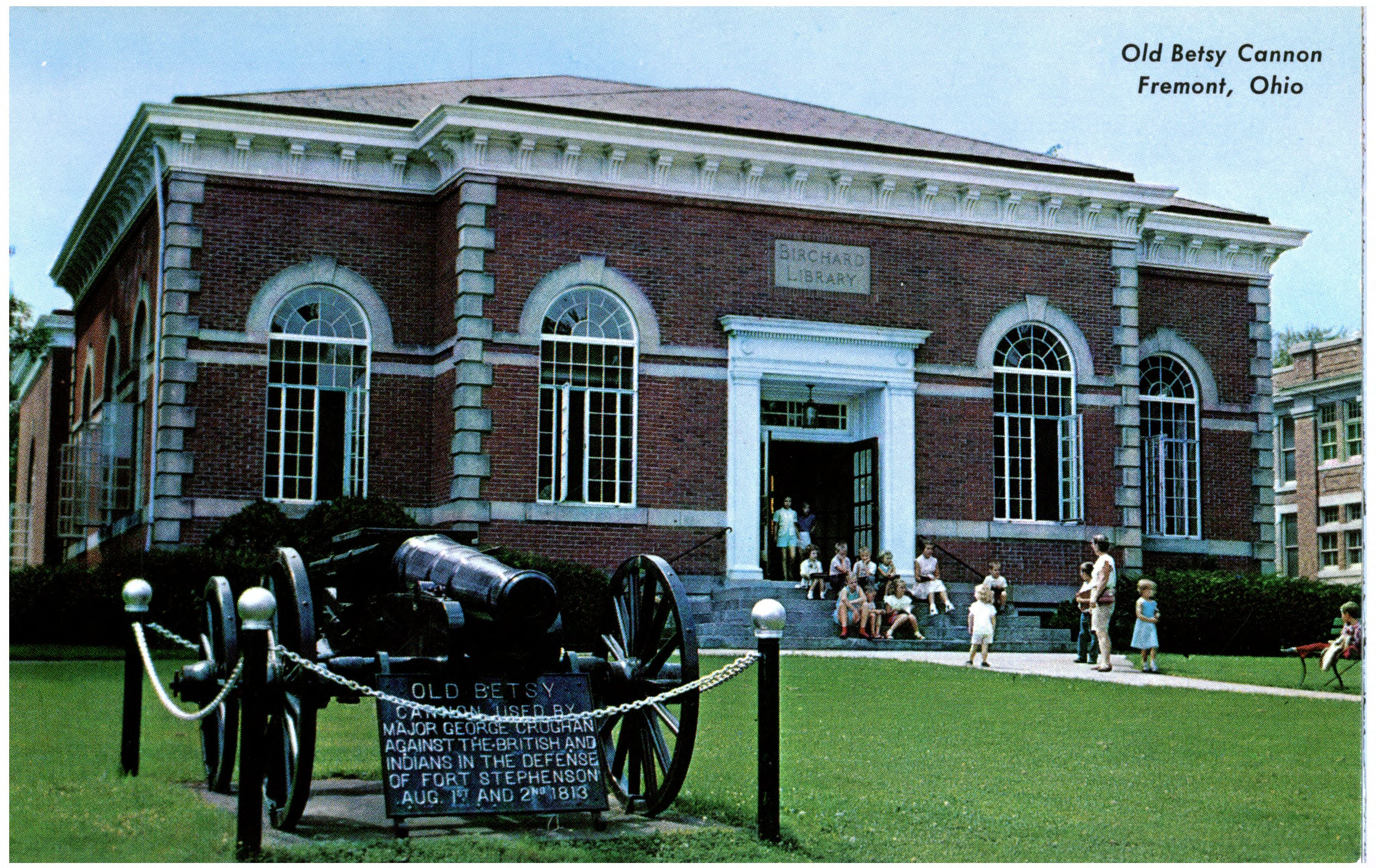
c. 1958 postcard of "Old Betsy" in front of the Birchard Library

The first formal celebration of the anniversary of the Battle of Fort Stephenson was held on August 2, 1839 in Lower Sandusky. A message from George Croghan was read at the celebration.

In 1849, Lower Sandusky was renamed Fremont. In 1851, the mayor of Fremont undertook efforts to locate and return "Old Betsy" to the site of Fort Stephenson. The gun was located in the Pittsburgh arsenal but mistakenly shipped to the city of Sandusky further to the east. Despite efforts by Sandusky to conceal the gun, "Old Betsy" was recovered and brought to Fremont. The cannon, which was restored in 2000, is now located outside the north entrance of the Birchard Library near the 1885 Soldiers' Monument.

In 1873, a $50,000 bequest made by Sardis Birchard allowed the City of Fremont to acquire the land on which the fort had stood. As stipulated in the bequest, a library was erected on the site and opened in 1878. A school and municipal building were also built on the site but have since been demolished.

The Soldiers Monument north of the library was unveiled on August 2, 1885. Former President Rutherford B. Hayes presided over the event. The monument commemorates those who fought at the Battle of Fort Stevenson as well as those who fought in later wars.

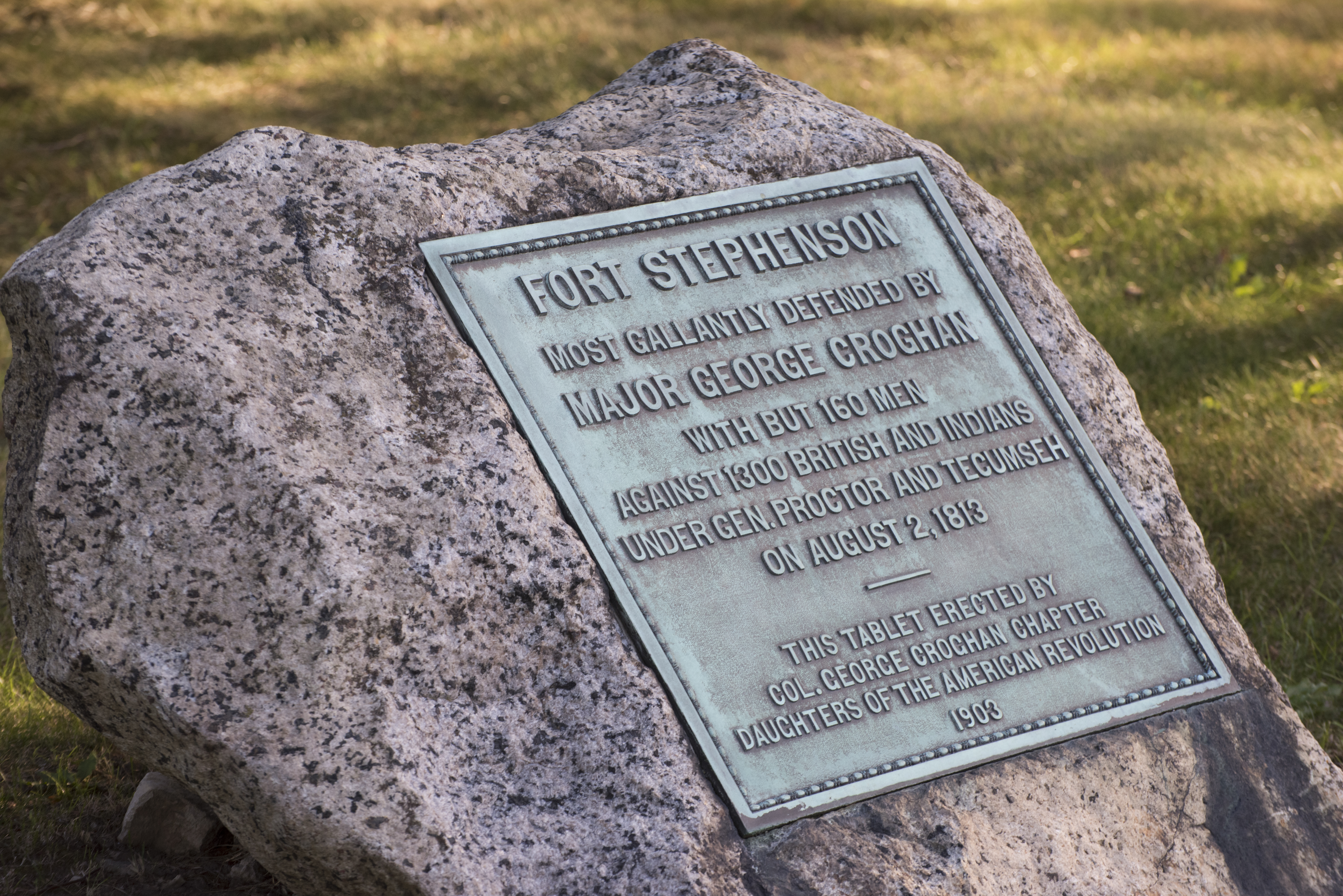
Brass tablet commemorating Fort Stephenson and Major George Croghan

In 1903, on the 90th anniversary of the Battle of Fort Stephenson, a granite boulder with a commemorative bronze tablet was placed near the Soldiers' Monument by the Colonel George Croghan Chapter of the Daughters of the American Revolution. A more detailed marker was erected in 1972 by the Sandusky County Historical Society and the Ohio Historical Society.

In 1906, the remains of George Croghan were removed from the Croghan Family Burying Ground at Locust Grove outside Louisville, Kentucky and reinterred at the base of the Soldiers' Monument.

Fremont celebrates "Croghan Day" each year in early August 2. Some years are marked solely by a wreath laying ceremony at the Soldiers' Monument, but in 2013 a three day historical festival and reenactment on the grounds of the Birchard Library celebrated the battle's bicentennial.
