= Birchard Public Library of Sandusky County =

Public library system in Ohio, US

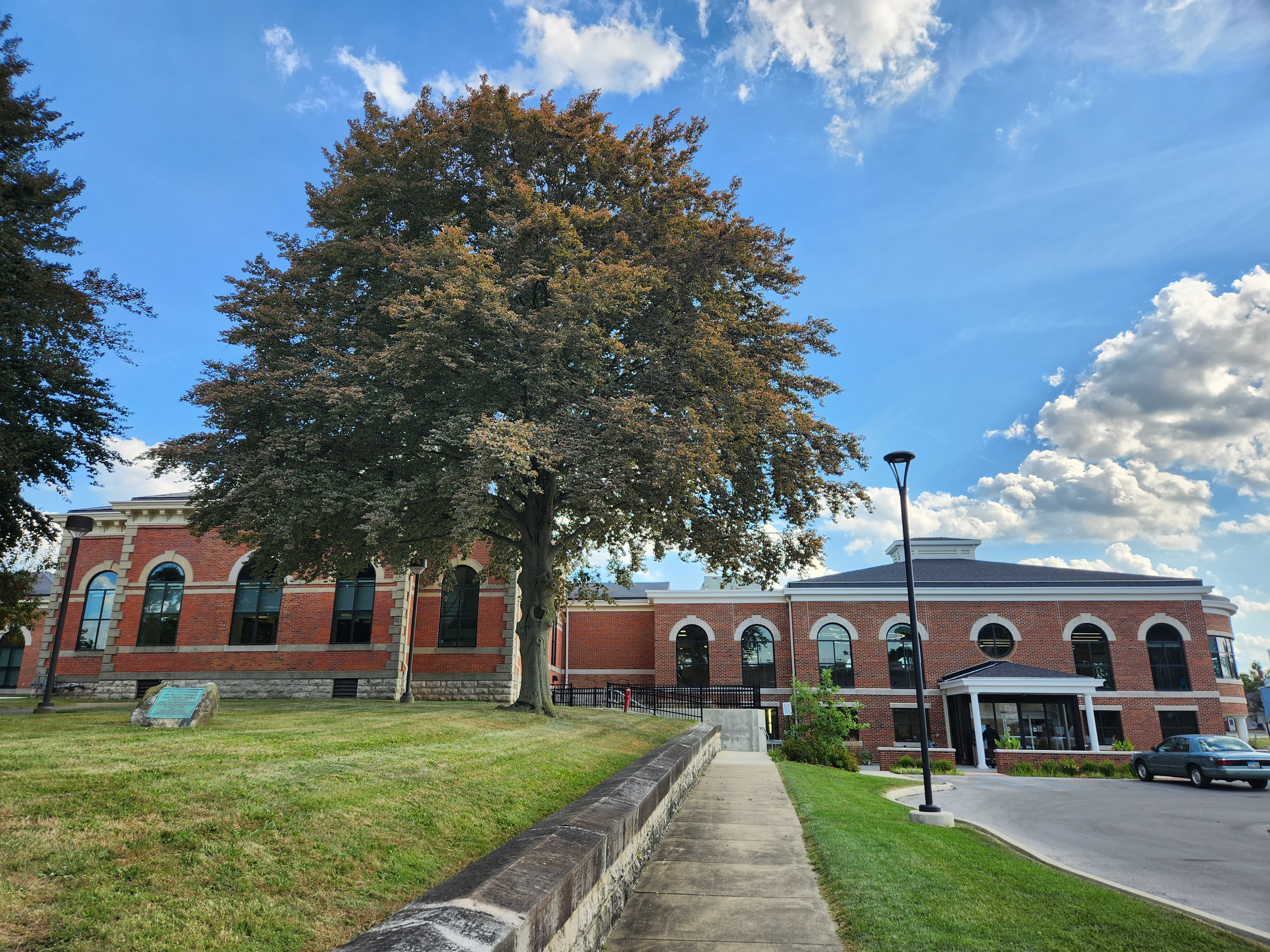
- The main branch of the Birchard Public Library in Fremont
- Location: Sandusky County, Ohio, U.S.
- Established: 1874; 152 years ago
- Branches: 4

Access and use
- Circulation: 343,712 (2020)
- Population served: 48,087 (2020)

Other information
- Website: birchard.org

The Birchard Public Library of Sandusky County is the public library system serving Sandusky County in Northwest Ohio. The library was founded in Fremont in 1874 with a bequest from former U.S. President and Fremont resident Rutherford B. Hayes, and is named after his uncle and benefactor Sardis Birchard. The Birchard Public Library system operates four locations in Sandusky County, serving over 100,000 visitors per year as of 2019.

== Locations ==
The Birchard Public Library system operates four locations: the main library in Fremont, and branches in Gibsonburg, Green Springs, and Woodville.

== Services ==
The Birchard Public Library is a member of CLEVNET, a library consortium founded by the Cleveland Public Library. CLEVNET provides shared services such as an online public access catalog, ebook access, and interlibrary loans for over 40 libraries in northern Ohio. The library system has been a member of CLEVNET since 1999.

== History ==
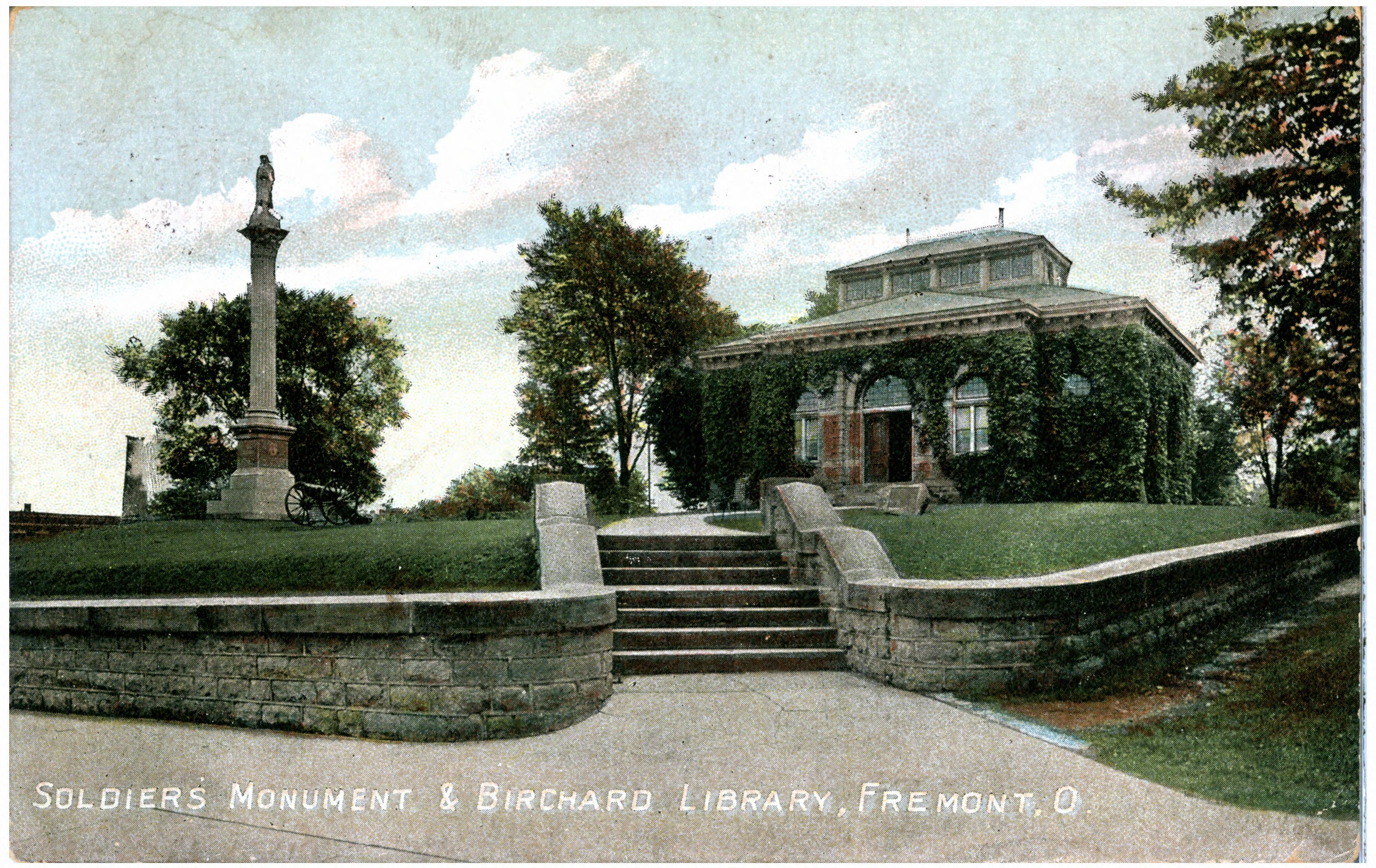
1908 postcard of the library

The Birchard Public Library's history dates to 1873, when a library association was established by local property developer and merchant Sardis Birchard. The first president of the library association was his nephew Rutherford Birchard Hayes, who had recently returned to his family's longtime residence in Fremont after serving two terms as Governor of Ohio. Birchard announced a bequest of $50,000 in July 1873 to establish a public library, but was unable to fully arrange it before his death in January 1874. Hayes arranged for the sale of his uncle's properties in Toledo to raise the funds, ensuring that construction could proceed.

The city was interested in preserving the former site of Fort Stephenson, which the city of Fremont grew around. The fort served a key role in the Battle of Fort Stephenson during the War of 1812, but it was not used by the military after the war. The city of Fremont purchased the site of the fort in 1873, with contributions from the Birchard Library Association. The library association opened a library on Front Street in June 1874 with 1,683 books, and began planning for the construction of a permanent library building.

By the time the cornerstone of the library was laid in September 1877, Hayes had been elected the 19th President of the United States. Construction proceeded quickly, and the new library building opened to the public in 1879. Within two years, it held over 5,000 books. Hayes remained the ceremonial head of the library association until his death in 1893. The library system received substantial tax funding starting in the 1930s, which allowed it to expand significantly. Additions to the main library building were constructed throughout the 20th century. By 1942, the library was a four-branch system, with the main library in Fremont and branches across Sandusky County. The library's bookmobile service began in the 1940s, and the system had an annual circulation of over 60,000 in 1942.

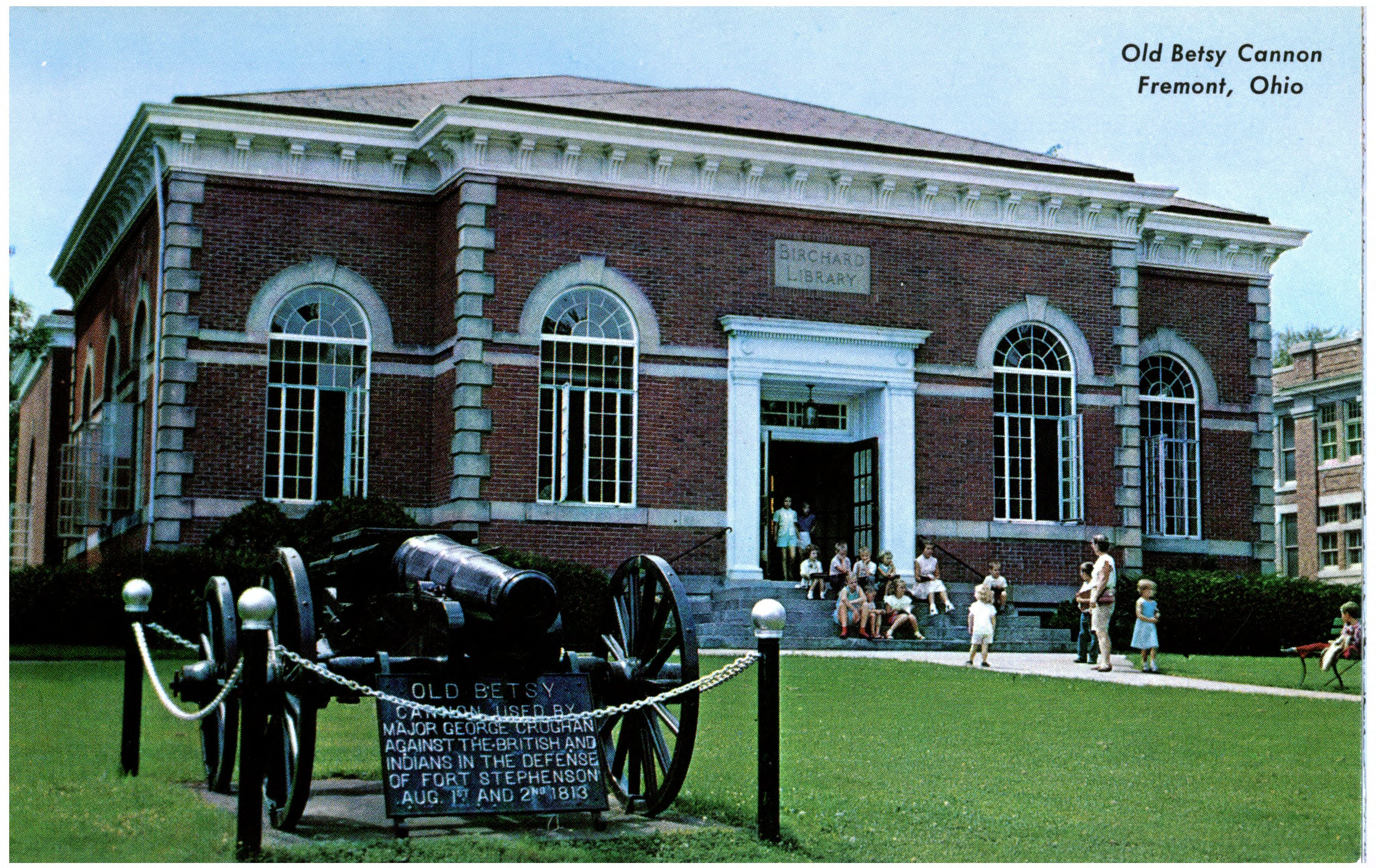
The "Old Betsy" cannon and the library on a 1950s postcard

The library system purchased a parcel of land adjacent to the main library in 2014. The parcel was the former site of Fremont Middle School, and was purchased from Fremont City Schools for $1. The terms of the purchase agreement required the library to consult the Sandusky County Historical Society and the Fremont Area Foundation before starting construction on the site. The site houses an 8,500-square-foot (790 m^{2}) addition to the historic library building, which opened in 2023. The expansion includes a new teen services department and a local history room, and was partially funded by a United States Department of Agriculture grant.
