= Edward W. Pearson Sr. =

African American entrepreneur

Edward Walton Pearson, Sr.
- 1937 portrait of Edward W. Pearson, Sr.
- Born: January 25, 1872; Glen Alpine, North Carolina
- Died: July 4, 1946
- Spouse: Annis Bradshaw Pearson
- Children: Iola Pearson Byers, Annette Pearson Cotton, and Edward W. Pearson, Jr.
- Parent(s): Sindy and Edward Pearson

Edward Walton Pearson, Sr. (January 25, 1872 – July 4, 1946) was an African-American entrepreneur, Buffalo Soldier and Spanish–American War veteran, civil rights leader and pioneering sports enthusiast. He moved to Asheville, North Carolina, in 1906, where he became known as the "Black Mayor of West Asheville" because of his influence in African-American neighborhood development and community life.

== Early life and education ==
Pearson was born in 1872 to Sindy and Edward Pearson, in Glen Alpine, Burke County, North Carolina. He completed local public school to the fourth grade. Interested in mining, he moved to Jellico, Tennessee, where he enlisted in the US Army. He was a Buffalo Soldier (9th Cavalry Troop B) from 1893 to 1898 in Fort Robinson, Nebraska, during the Spanish-American War.

After being discharged from the Army, Pearson lived in Chicago, Illinois. He supplemented his early formal education by taking correspondence courses on insurance, business, religion and law, including courses at the Chicago Correspondence School of Law.

== Business ventures ==
After moving to Asheville, Pearson began development of Burton Street (then known as Pearson Park) and Park View neighborhoods, working with Rutherford Platt Hayes, who bought the land, to create African-American subdivisions. These neighborhoods continued to be predominantly African-American until the late 20th century, but numerous residents were displaced because of urban renewal. He also sold real estate for development in this area as an agent on behalf of Hayes, a developer and librarian, son of President Rutherford B. Hayes.

In addition to his real estate ventures, Pearson operated a general store, organized the Mountain City Mutual Insurance Company, and ran a mail order shoe business called Piedmont Shoe Company. The general store in West Asheville was the home base for these operations.

== Agricultural fair ==
Pearson's commitment to improving the lives of African-Americans in Asheville extended to recreational activities and community life. He donated Pearson Park in the Burton Street Community to the City of Asheville. In 1914, he organized the Buncombe County and District Colored Agricultural Fair there. One of the largest agricultural fairs in the Southeast, it attracted thousands of visitors of all races from all over Western North Carolina and South Carolina. Attractions included amusement park rides, games, livestock shows and cash prize competitions in categories ranging from baked goods to flower arrangement. The Fair was held annually until 1947, a year after Pearson's death, and was later revived as the Burton Street Agricultural Fair.

== Baseball ==
In 1916, Pearson formed the Asheville Royal Giants, Asheville's first black semi-professional baseball team. The Royal Giants played at Oates Park on Asheville's south side and sometimes at Pearson Park. Baseball was not a full-time career for his players, many of whom held jobs at Biltmore Estate, on trains or in hotels like the Grove Park Inn, Battery Park Hotel and the former George Vanderbilt Hotel.

In 1921, Pearson also founded and became president of the Blue Ridge Colored Baseball League.

== Other organizations ==
Pearson was very involved in community organizations. In 1933, he organized and was first president of the Asheville branch of the National Association for the Advancement of Colored People. He was also president of the Asheville chapters of the Universal Negro Improvement Association and the North Carolina Negro Improvement Association.

Pearson was a member of several fraternal groups, including the Grand United Order of Odd Fellows in America, the Knights of Pythias of North America, South America, Europe, Asia, Africa and Australia and the Prince Hall Freemasonry. As a freemason, he was elected to the office of Grand Master.

== Family ==
Pearson and his family lived in a home behind the general store he operated in West Asheville. His wife was Annis (Bradshaw) Pearson. They had two daughters, Iola Pearson Byers and Annette Pearson Cotton, and one son, Edward W. Pearson Jr. He also had his eldest son from a previous relationship with Edna Parker named William.

== Legacy ==
Pearson's legacy has been commemorated in Asheville with a community identification sign in 2008 as well as larger-than-life mural painted on the back of Burton Street Community Center in 2014 for the 100th anniversary celebration of the fair that Pearson first organized in 1914. Activist and artist DeWayne Barton revived the Fair in 2010 as the Burton Street Agricultural Fair. As of 2023, the Burton Street Agricultural Fair continues to be held annually at the Burton Street Community Center park.
