= Spiegel Grove =

Historical home of US President Rutherford B. Hayes

- Spiegel Grove (Rutherford B. Hayes Summer Home)
- U.S. National Register of Historic Places
- U.S. National Historic Landmark
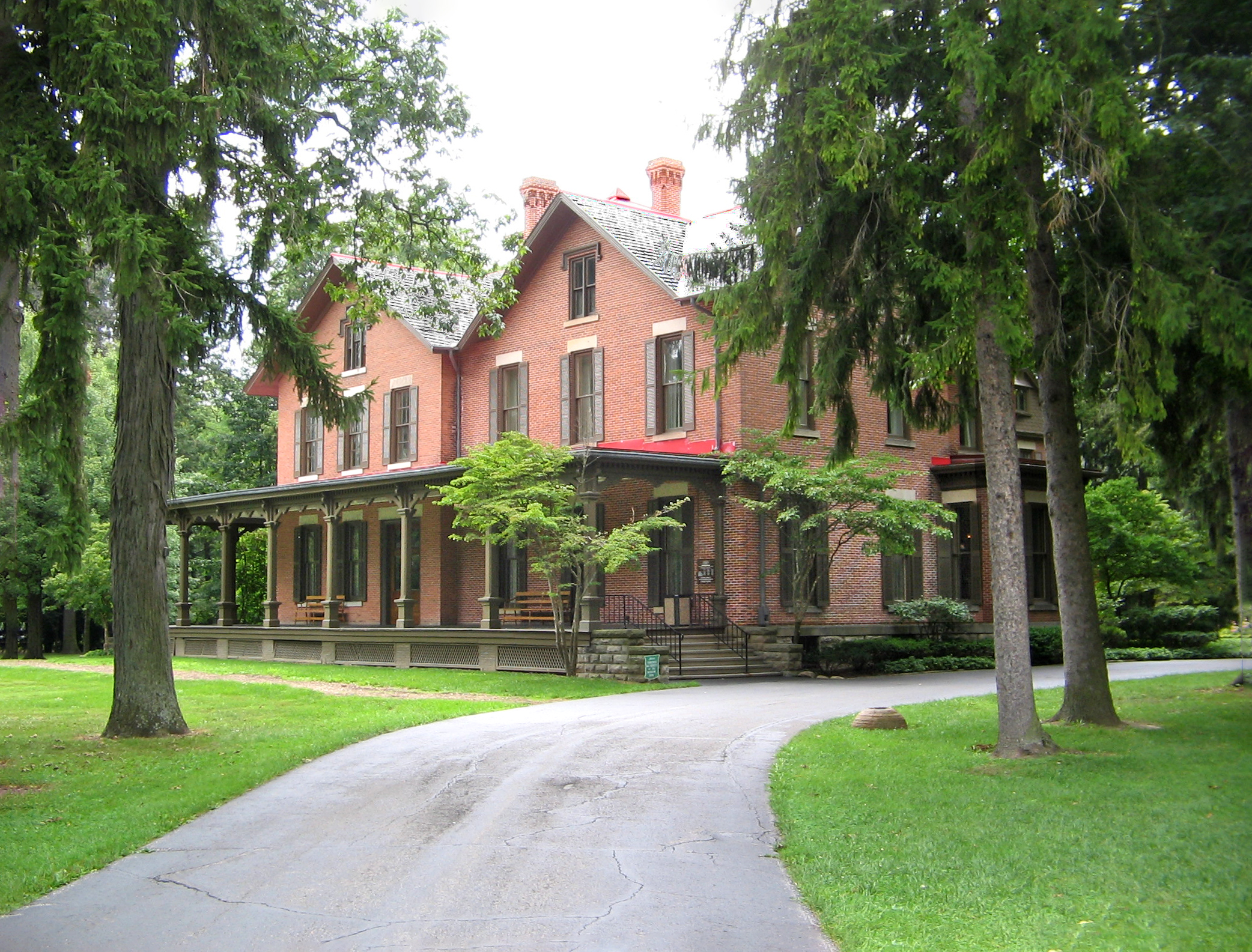

- Location within Ohio Location within the United States
- Interactive map showing the location for Spiegel Grove
- Location: Fremont, Ohio
- Coordinates: 41°20′29″N 83°07′48″W
- Area: 25 acres (100,000 m^{2})
- Built: 1873
- Architect: Sardis Birchard
- NRHP reference No.: 66000624

Significant dates
- Added to NRHP: October 15, 1966
- Designated NHL: January 29, 1964

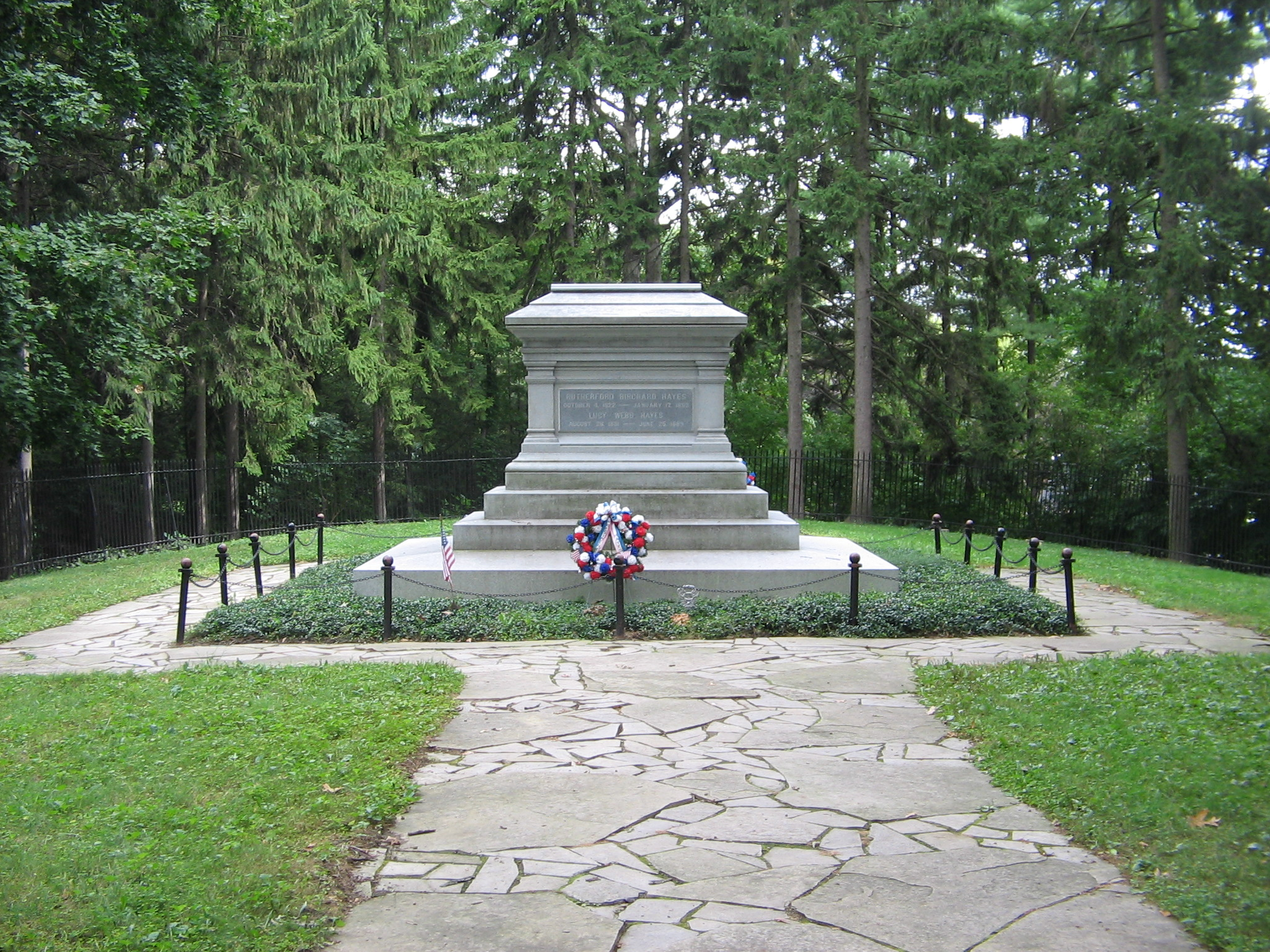
Rutherford and Lucy Hayes' grave at Spiegel Grove

Spiegel Grove, also known as Spiegel Grove State Park, Rutherford B. Hayes House, Rutherford B. Hayes Summer Home and Rutherford B. Hayes State Memorial was the estate of Rutherford B. Hayes, the 19th president of the United States, located at the corner of Hayes and Buckland Avenues in Fremont, Ohio.

Hayes moved to the estate in 1873. After his death the house was given to the state of Ohio. The Rutherford B. Hayes Presidential Center is now located on the property.

== History ==
Spiegel is the German and Dutch word for mirror. The traditional story is that the estate was named by Hayes' uncle Sardis Birchard, who first built it for his own residence. He named it for the reflective pools of water that collected on the property after a rain shower.

Rutherford Hayes inherited the estate and moved there in 1873. He died in 1893 and was buried in Oakwood Cemetery next to his wife who had died in 1889. Following the gift of this home to the state of Ohio for the Spiegel Grove State Park, their bodies were reinterred at Spiegel Grove in 1915. They are buried at a memorial on the property. The Rutherford B. Hayes Presidential Center, established in 1916, is also located here.

"Old Whitey", a war horse that served during the Civil War and belonged to then-Major (later Major General) Hayes, became the mascot of the 23rd Ohio Volunteer Infantry. The horse was buried at Spiegel Grove upon his death in 1879, with a grave marker reading Old Whitey A Hero of Nineteen Battles 1861–1865.

Spiegel Grove was designated as a National Historic Landmark on January 29, 1964.

On October 15, 1966, it was added to the National Register of Historic Places. It is owned by the Ohio History Connection.

== Design ==
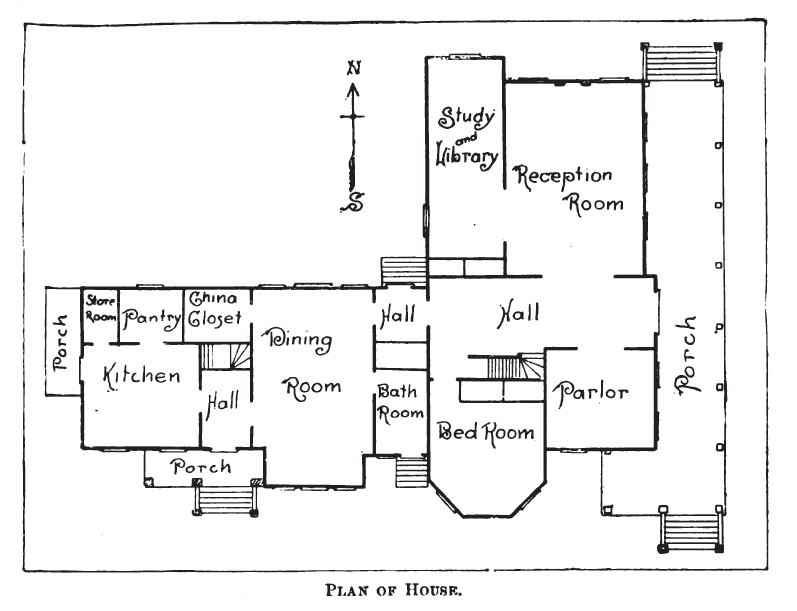
1885 first floor plan sketch by Henry Howe

The house was built around 1860 for Sardis Birchard as a two-story brick mansion. It featured many bedrooms and a wrap-around porch. In 1880, after Rutherford B. Hayes had moved in, he expanded the house by the addition of 5 new rooms, and the massive staircase that led all the way up to the 4th floor. In 1889, 6 more rooms were added to the house, giving it its current appearance. After the expansions, the house had more than 30 rooms and 10,000 square feet (930 m^{2}) of living space.

== Tourism ==
The estate was given to the state for the Spiegel Grove State Park. Since then, the house has been open for tourists as a house museum. For a fee, visitors can view the various rooms as well as furniture, books, and other items in the house. Visitors are allowed to access most of the rooms on the first and second floors. The third and fourth floors are not open to the public.

== See also ==
- USS Spiegel Grove
- List of residences of presidents of the United States
- List of burial places of presidents and vice presidents of the United States
- Presidential memorials in the United States
- List of National Historic Landmarks in Ohio
- National Register of Historic Places listings in Sandusky County, Ohio
