= National Register of Historic Places listings in Dawson County, Nebraska =

Location of Dawson County in Nebraska

Dawson County, Nebraska, United States, has 10 properties and districts listed on the National Register of Historic Places.

The locations of National Register properties and districts for which the latitude and longitude coordinates are included below may be seen in a map.

This National Park Service list is complete through NPS recent listings posted October 30, 2026.

== Current listings ==
	Name on the Register	Image	Date listed	Location	City or town	Description
1	Allen's Opera House	Allen's Opera House	September 28, 1988 (#88000951)	100 E. 8th 40°51′35″N 99°59′07″W	Cozad	part of the Opera House Buildings in Nebraska 1867-1917 Multiple Property Submission
2	Ernest A. Calling House	Ernest A. Calling House	October 25, 1979 (#79001437)	1514 Lake Ave. 40°56′00″N 100°09′36″W	Gothenburg	
3	Carnegie Public Library	Carnegie Public Library	December 19, 1986 (#86003443)	1104 Lake Ave. 40°55′47″N 100°09′37″W	Gothenburg	
4	Cozad Downtown Historic District	Cozad Downtown Historic District	November 5, 2018 (#100003093)	Roughly bounded by 9th, 7th, H & F Sts. 40°51′35″N 99°59′09″W	Cozad	
5	Dawson County Courthouse	Dawson County Courthouse	January 10, 1990 (#89002236)	Washington St. between 7th and 8th Sts. 40°46′49″N 99°44′25″W	Lexington	part of the County Courthouses of Nebraska Multiple Property Submission
6	Hendee Hotel	Hendee Hotel	March 21, 1979 (#79001436)	220 E. 8th St. 40°51′35″N 99°58′58″W	Cozad	
7	Midway Ranch House	Midway Ranch House	July 5, 2001 (#01000715)	Address Restricted	Gothenburg	
8	Midway Stage Station	Midway Stage Station	October 15, 1969 (#69000372)	South of Gothenburg; 40°53′07″N 100°08′51″W	Gothenburg	
9	Ira Webster Olive House	Ira Webster Olive House	November 27, 1989 (#89002042)	401 E. 13th St. 40°47′13″N 99°44′10″W	Lexington	
10	Harry V. Temple House	Harry V. Temple House	November 12, 2019 (#100004608)	305 E. 13th St. 40°47′12″N 99°44′15″W	Lexington	

== See also ==
- List of National Historic Landmarks in Nebraska
- National Register of Historic Places listings in Nebraska
