= Carnegie Public Library (Gothenburg, Nebraska) =

- U.S. National Register of Historic Places
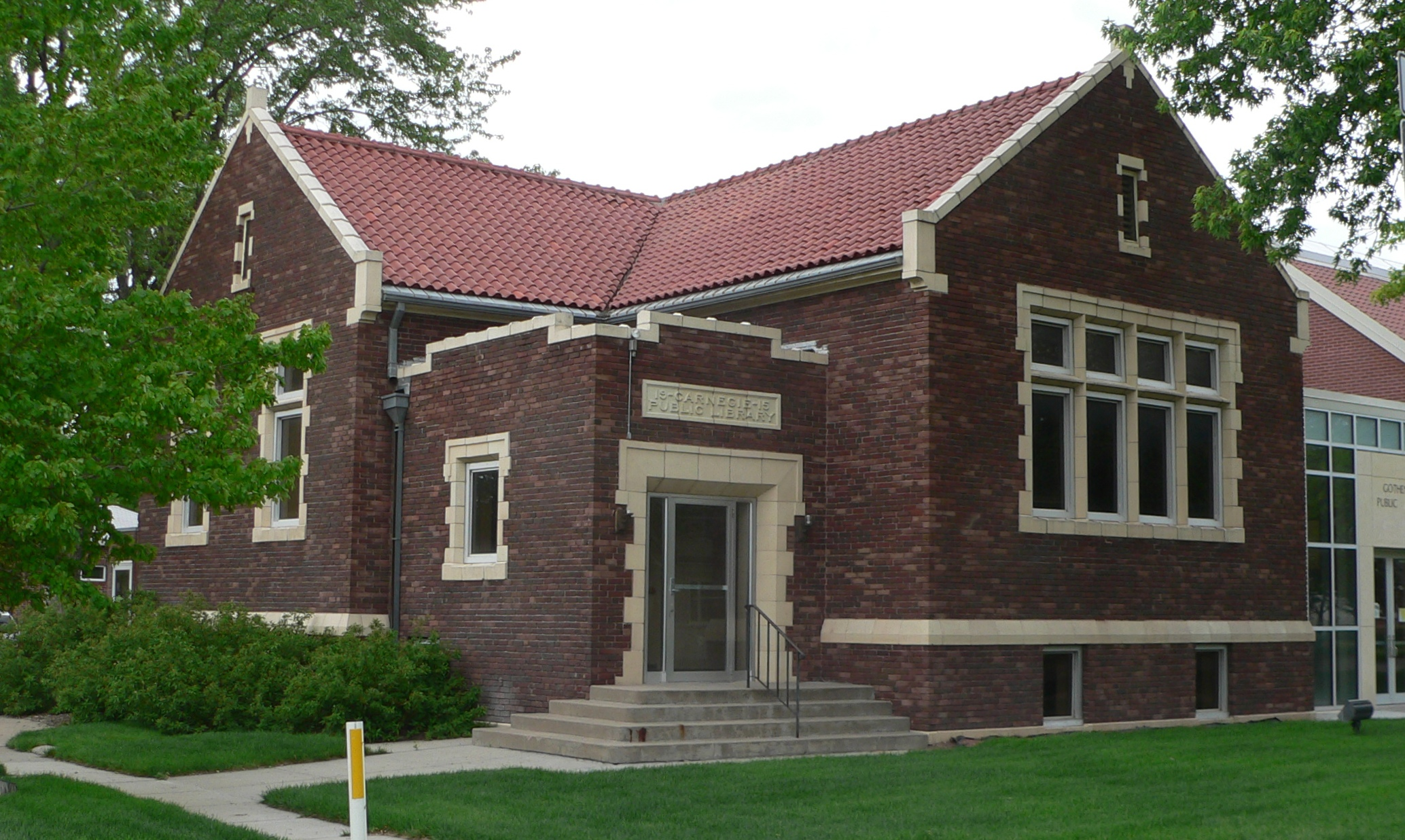
- The library in 2010

- Location within Nebraska Location within the United States
- Location: 1104 Lake Avenue, Gothenburg, Nebraska
- Coordinates: 40°55′47″N 100°09′37″W
- Area: less than one acre
- Built: 1915
- Built by: J.W. Fauble
- Architect: Morse N. Bair
- Architectural style: Jacobethan Revival
- NRHP reference No.: 86003443
- Added to NRHP: December 19, 1986

The Carnegie Public Library, also known as the Gothenburg Public Library, is a historic Carnegie library building in Gothenburg, Nebraska. It was built in 1915–1916 with a grant from the Carnegie Corporation, and designed in the Jacobethan Revival style by architect Morse N. Bair. It has been listed on the National Register of Historic Places since December 19, 1986.
