= Mary van Kleeck =

American social scientist and feminist

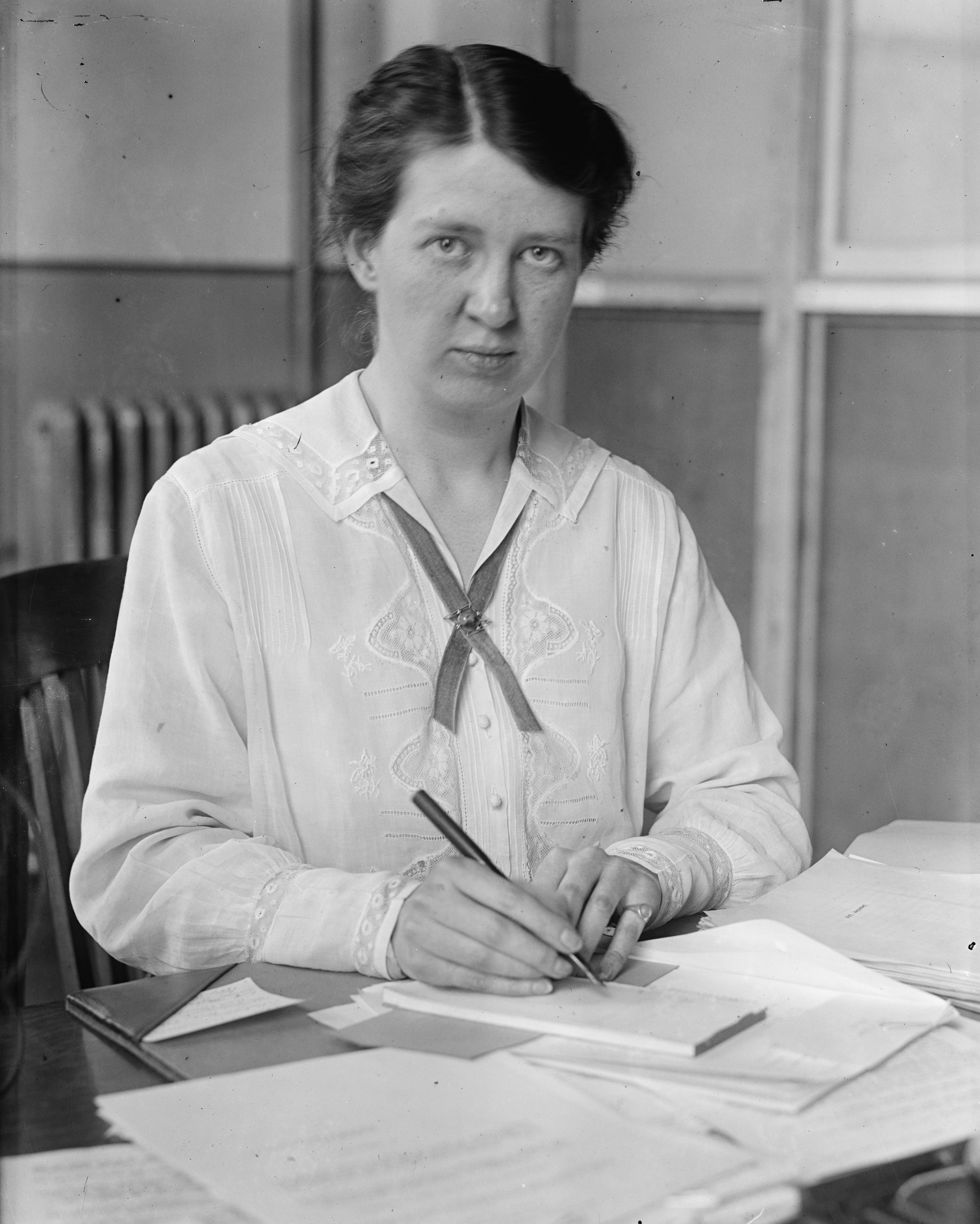
- van Kleeck c. 1913–1918
- Born: Mary Abby Van Kleeck (Note: Mary van Kleeck changed the capitalization of her last name in the 1920s.); June 26, 1883; Glenham, New York, U.S.
- Died: June 8, 1972 (aged 88); Kingston, New York, U.S.
- Education: Smith College
- Occupation: Social scientist
- Years active: 1904–1948
- Employer: Russell Sage Foundation (1910–1948)
- Political party: American Labor Party (1948–1956)
- Partner: Mary Fleddérus

Mary Abby van Kleeck (June 26, 1883 – June 8, 1972) was an American social scientist of the 20th century. She was a notable figure in the American labor movement as well as a proponent of scientific management and a planned economy.

Of Dutch descent, van Kleeck was a lifelong New Yorker, with the exception of her undergraduate studies at Smith College in Massachusetts. She began her career as part of the settlement movement, investigating women's labor in New York City. Van Kleeck rose to prominence as director of the Russell Sage Foundation's Department of Industrial Studies, which she led for over 30 years, beginning in 1916. During World War I, van Kleeck was appointed by US President Woodrow Wilson to lead the development of workplace standards for women entering the workforce, becoming the first woman appointed to a position of authority in the American federal government during the war.

After the war, she led the creation of a federal agency to advocate for women in the workforce (the Women's Bureau), before returning to the Sage Foundation and continuing her determined research into labor issues. By the 1930s, van Kleeck had become a socialist, arguing that central planning of economies was the most effective way to protect labor rights. During the Great Depression, she became a prominent left-wing critic of the New Deal and American capitalism, advocating a radical agenda for social reformers and workers. Retiring from the Sage Foundation in 1948, van Kleeck ran for New York State Senate as a member of the American Labor Party, but lost the election and turned her focus to peace activism and nuclear disarmament. As a long-time advocate of planned economies, she became a defender of Soviet-American friendship, leading to suspicion from the powerful anti-communist movement. She died aged 88 in 1972.

== Early life ==
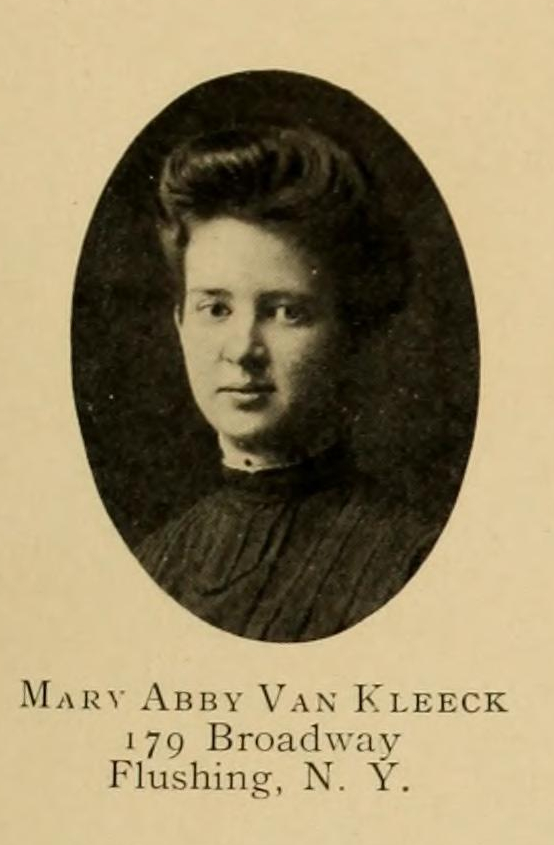
Van Kleeck in the Smith College yearbook, 1904

Mary Abby Van Kleeck was born June 26, 1883, in Glenham, New York. She was the child of Eliza Mayer of Baltimore and Robert Boyd Van Kleeck, an Episcopal minister of Dutch origin. On her father's side, she was descended from the Schenck family of Brooklyn. On her mother's side, her grandfather was Charles F. Mayer, a prominent Baltimore lawyer and politician. The youngest of five siblings, including a brother who died in infancy, Van Kleeck was close to her mother, but had a distant relationship with her father, who was often sick when she was young. He died in 1892, when she was only nine. With a strong reputation for intelligence and force of personality among her classmates, Van Kleeck was the valedictorian of her class at Flushing High School in New York City. She wrote in her valedictory address:

We are living in an age of disputes, and by no means the least among them is the question of woman and her rights ... [those who defend women] make one great mistake—they bravely defend woman, but they forget that she needs no defense, they eloquently plead her release from the bonds of slavery, but they forget that she is not a slave.

— Mary van Kleeck, 1900

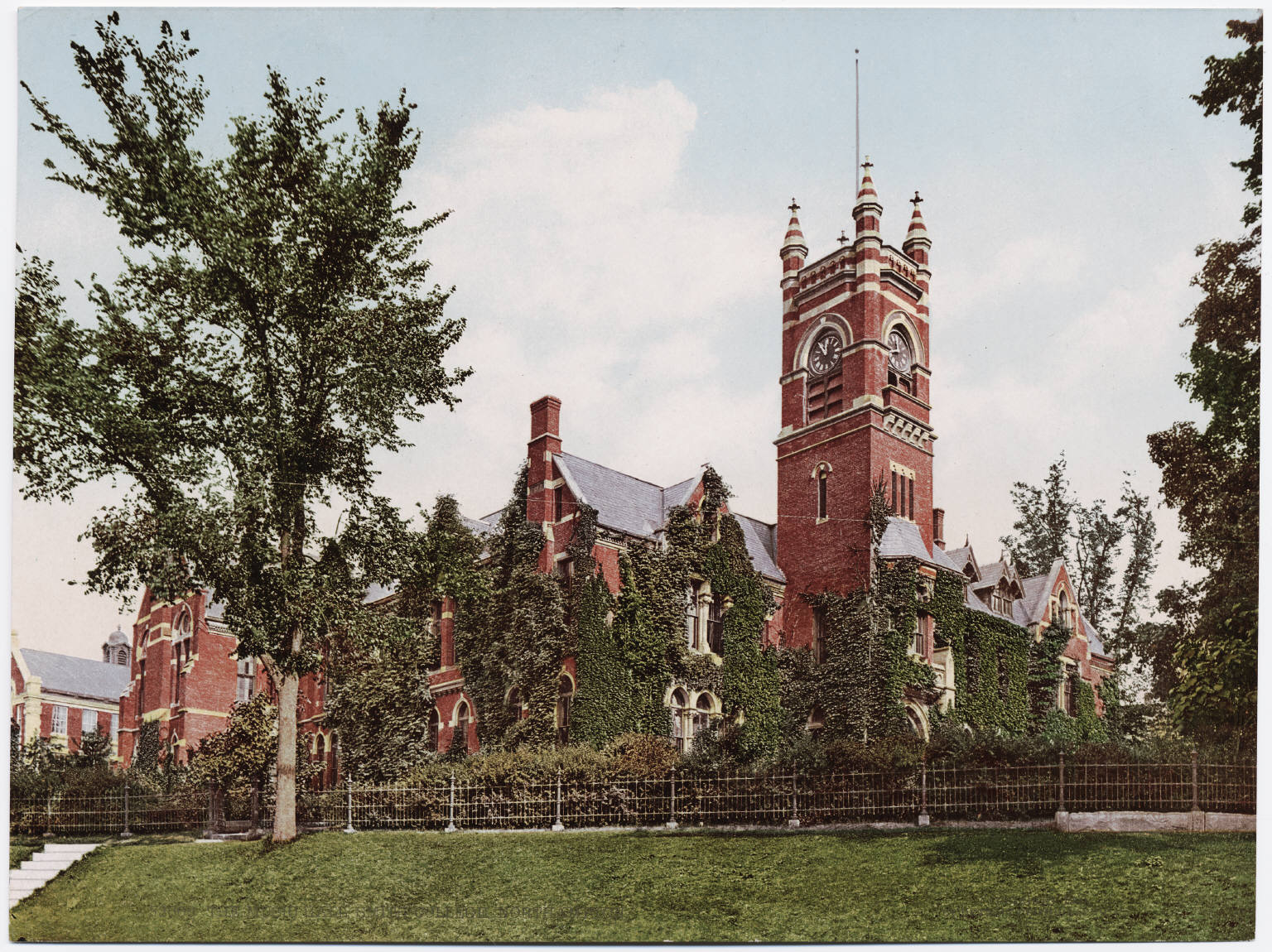
Van Kleeck studied at Smith College before beginning her career in New York City.

Van Kleeck studied at Smith College from 1900 to 1904, where she flourished—studying calculus, writing poetry, and enjoying popularity among her fellow students. The Smith College Association for Christian Work (SCACW) was the main student organization on campus, and van Kleeck rapidly became involved. She served as president of the SCACW in 1903. Through this organization, she encountered the YWCA, which she remained affiliated with for the remainder of her life. At a YWCA summer retreat in Silver Bay, New York, van Kleeck was drawn to the ideas of Florence Simms, the YWCA's industrial secretary. Van Kleeck became determined to dedicate her career to public service, an ideal to which she dedicated a poem in Smith's yearbook.

== Beginning of career ==
A year after graduating from Smith with an A.B., van Kleeck received a joint postgraduate fellowship from the College Settlement Association and the Smith College Alumnae Association which enabled her to perform research in New York City. As part of this work, van Kleeck carried out investigations of the enforcement of the labor law governing the workweek (limited to 60 hours at the time, though this provision was frequently ignored by employers).

She also worked for the New York Child Labor Committee and the Consumers League. Van Kleeck's work with the College Settlement Association, along with her role as industrial secretary of the Alliance Employment Bureau (AEB), represented the beginning of her research on women in industry and child labor. For the AEB, she conducted a study on the irregular working conditions of milliners and makers of artificial flowers, both major sources of employment for women at the time. Van Kleeck also undertook graduate work in social economy at Columbia University during this time. She studied under the experienced labor economist Henry Rogers Seager and sociologists Franklin Giddings and Samuel McCune Lindsay, but never completed a doctoral degree.

=== Russell Sage Foundation ===
Van Kleeck gained support from the Russell Sage Foundation in 1907, shortly after its establishment, the start of a professional relationship which would last for forty years. The organization had been founded by Margaret Olivia Sage to support social activism and Progressive reforms through dedicated scientific research. Mentored and trained by Florence Kelley and Lilian Brandt, prominent older labor activists and social reformers, van Kleeck was hired directly by the Foundation in 1910 to lead its Committee on Women's Work. Her initial salary was $1500 annually. She was instrumental in the passage of New York laws prohibiting long working hours in 1910 and 1915. Van Kleeck and the Sage Foundation published a series of books based on her research: Artificial Flower Makers (1913), Women in the Bookbinding Trade (1913), and Wages in the Millinery Trade (1914).

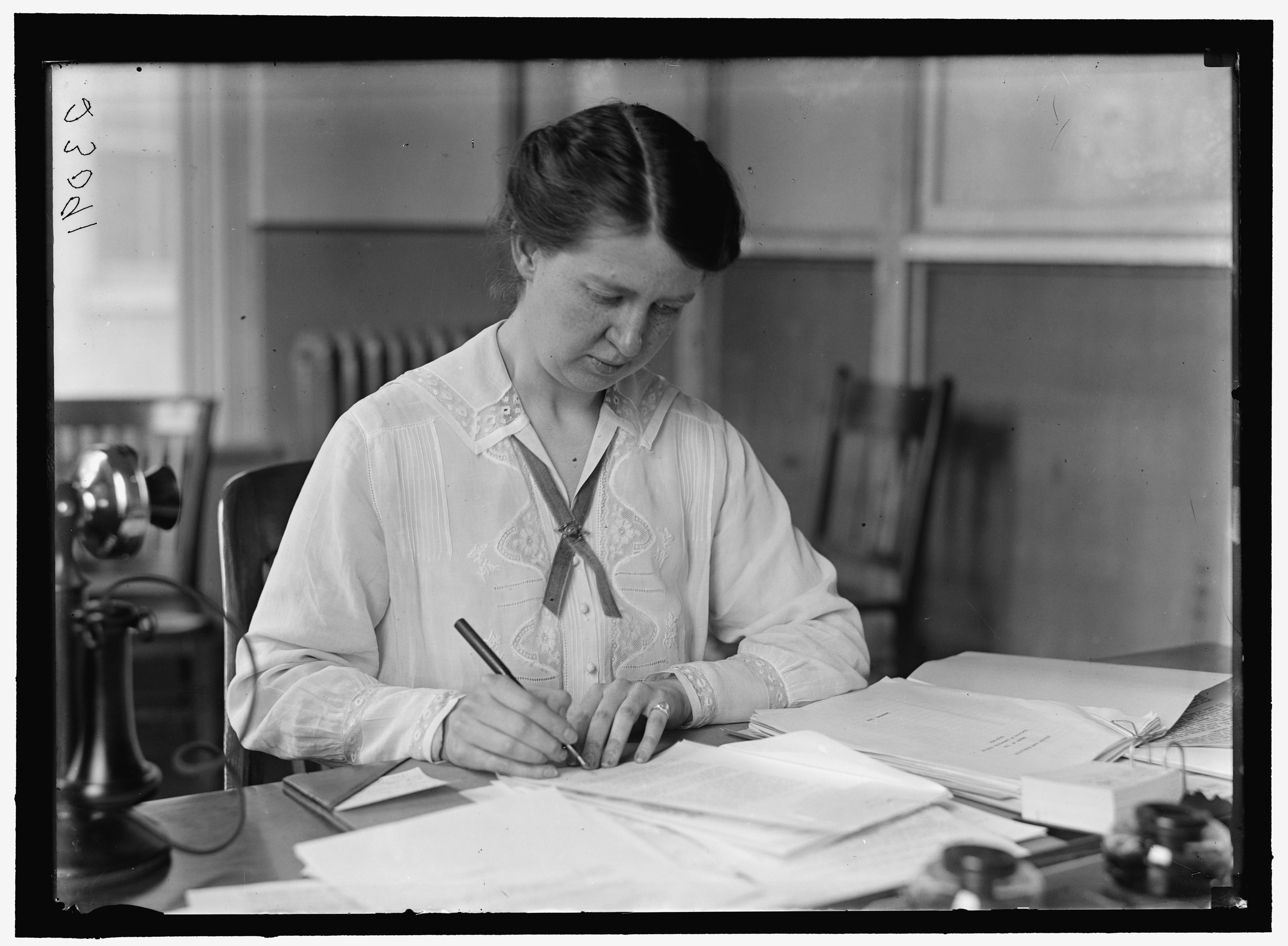
Van Kleeck at work with the Russell Sage Foundation before World War I

In 1916, van Kleeck persuaded the Foundation to create the Division of Industrial Studies with her as its head. As director of the division, soon renamed and expanded to become the Department of Industrial Studies, she became a well-known figure in the study of industrial labor conditions and women's employment in industry. Van Kleeck's department became an organization known for expertise on industry and labor, for training graduate students and for developing new methods of investigation. Its work was characterized by "careful empiricism, collegial review, and cooperation with state and private agencies," according to the historian Guy Alchon.

Van Kleeck's department frequently recommended labor reforms, such as the establishment of cooperative wage boards. More than once, the Sage Foundation was required to protect the Department of Industrial Studies from reprisals from aggrieved corporations which had been investigated by the department. The Remington Arms manufacturing company, criticized by van Kleeck's department in 1916 for providing substandard conditions for its workers, attempted to suppress the resulting report, but was rebuffed by Robert DeForest, the foundation's vice president.

Alongside Eleanor Roosevelt, van Kleeck was also co-vice president of the Women's City Club of New York, which was founded in 1915. During this period, van Kleeck's output of labor studies and other articles was prodigious, and she often worked closely with the Women's Trade Union League (WTUL). For instance, she authored an article in the Journal of Political Economy arguing that working girls should be able to access evening school courses without financial barriers, published in May 1915. Van Kleeck also found the time to serve on New York Mayor John P. Mitchel's Committee on Unemployment. In addition, she taught a series of courses on industrial issues at Columbia University's New York School of Philanthropy from 1914 to 1917. At Columbia, Van Kleeck encountered the ideas of Taylorism (also known as scientific management) and rapidly became a proponent, viewing it as a "social science of utopian potential." She was a prominent member of the Taylor Society for several decades. Van Kleeck also belonged to the National Society of Colonial Dames.

== World War I and the Women's Bureau ==
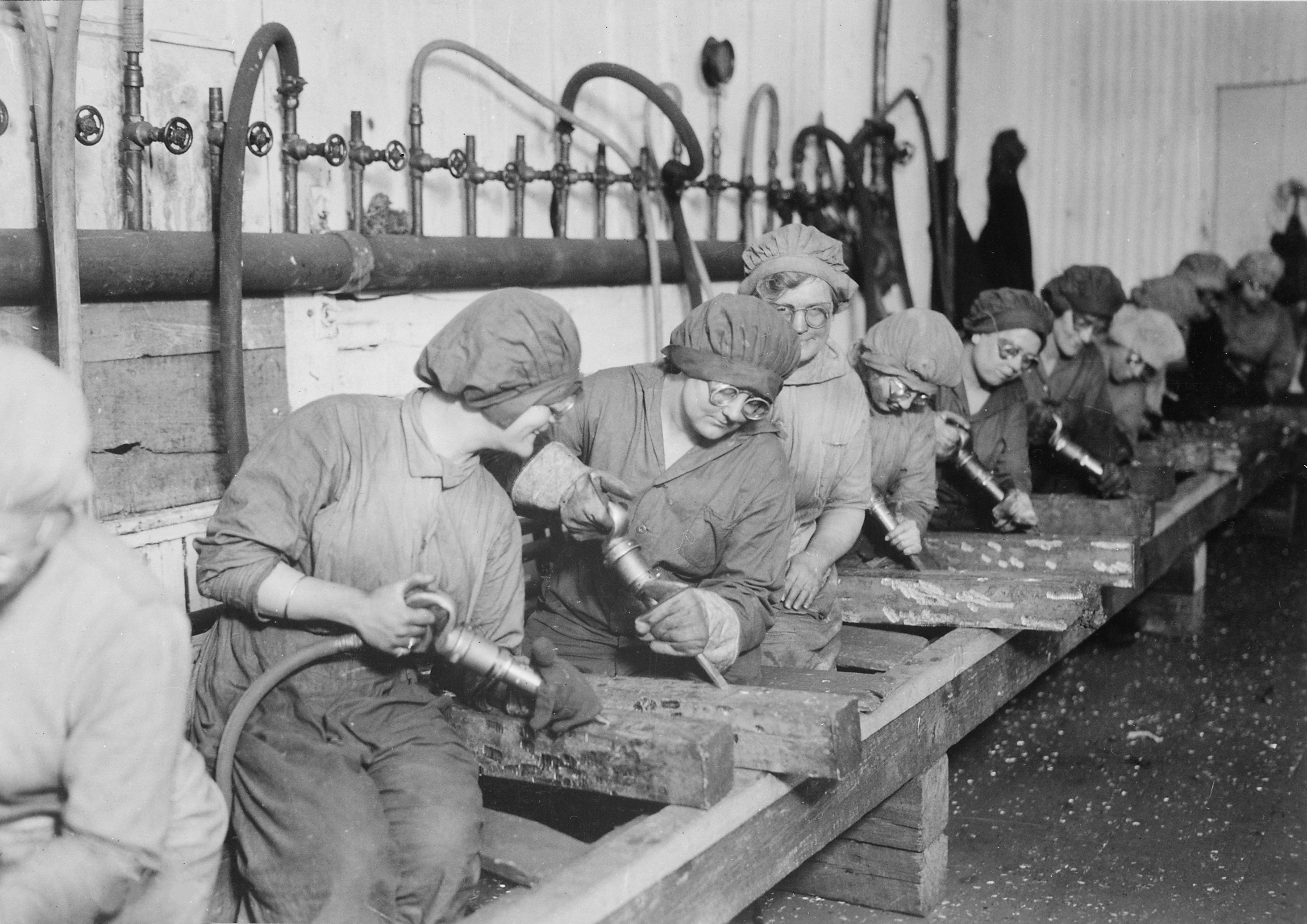
Van Kleeck investigated labor conditions for women in the workforce during World War I, such as these ordnance manufacturers in Pennsylvania.

In 1917, the United States entered World War I. By this point, van Kleeck enjoyed "a well-deserved reputation as one of the nation's leading experts on women's employment." At the behest of the War Industries Board and Herman Schneider, van Kleeck investigated the possibility of employing women in U.S. Army warehouses. She recommended the creation of a Women's Bureau in the War Department, and as a result President Woodrow Wilson appointed van Kleeck to lead a new Women in Industry Service group, a sub-agency of the Department of Labor. As such, she became the first woman in the United States appointed to a position of authority in the federal government since the beginning of the country's involvement in World War I. Van Kleeck wrote that the great numbers of women brought into the workforce by the war represented a "new freedom" for women: "freedom to serve their country through their industry not as women but as workers judged by the same standards and rewarded by the same recompense as men".

The Women in Industry Service group produced a series of reports documenting wage disparities, unsafe working conditions, and discrimination against female workers, conducting investigations in 31 states. Their recommendations were often ignored, and at an October 1918 conference to discuss women's labor organized by van Kleeck, Secretary of Labor William Wilson declined to take action to address wage inequality. Van Kleeck made it a priority to appoint a black woman to the staff of the Women in Industry Service group, working with George Haynes to find a suitable candidate. Eventually, an experienced researcher named Helen Irvin, a graduate of Howard University, was hired from the Red Cross.

In December 1918, the group published a wide-ranging report entitled Standards for the Employment of Women in Industry. The report was later used as the basis for the groundbreaking Fair Labor Standards Act of 1938, which applied standards to workplaces throughout the country. After the war, van Kleeck's group became the United States Women's Bureau. Van Kleeck wrote the law enabling this transition in June 1920. On July 14, van Kleeck was appointed as the head of the new agency within the Department of Labor. Although she was expected to lead the Bureau permanently, van Kleeck was called away to help care for her dying mother and resigned after a few weeks. Mary Anderson, her close friend and colleague, became its first long-term director instead.

== Interwar career ==
Van Kleeck resumed her work and research with the Russell Sage Foundation after World War I, once more becoming director of the Department of Industrial Studies. The foundation continued to perform in-depth studies of conditions for workers at workplaces such as the Rockefeller coal and steel works (in cooperation with Ben Selekman), the Dutchess Bleachery, and Filene's Department Store. These studies collectively represented "one of the decade's most searching examinations of the dramatic changes underway in the relationship between capital, labor, stockholders, and management," according to the economic historian Mark Hendrickson. During the 1920s, van Kleeck also served on several government committees in Harding's, Coolidge's, and Hoover's administrations, including the President's Conference on Unemployment in 1921. Chaired by Hoover, who was then Secretary of Commerce, the unemployment committee developed a plan for the uniform calculation of employment statistics across the United States, work in which van Kleeck played a key role. An indefatigable worker, van Kleeck additionally was a trustee of Smith College from 1922 to 1930 and headed up the National Interracial Conference in 1928.

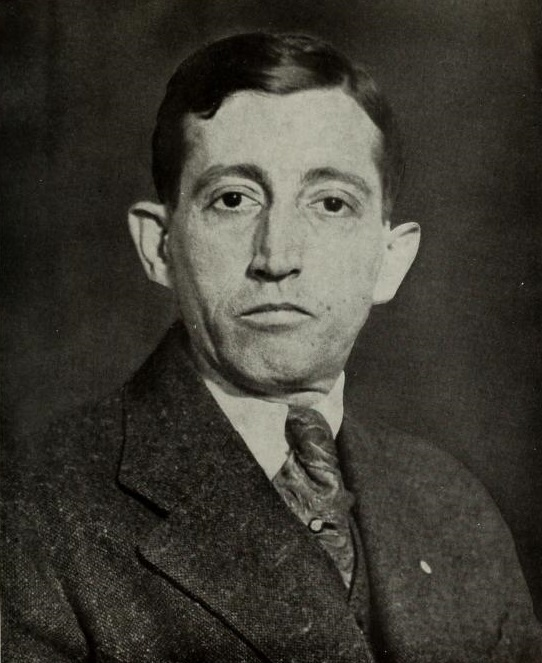
Will H. Hays reached out to van Kleeck because of her expertise on labor issues

In 1924, Will H. Hays, the powerful head of the Motion Picture Producers and Distributors of America, asked van Kleeck to undertake a study of the casting industry in Hollywood, which he believed was rife with exploitation. Van Kleeck conducted the study, and, among other findings, recommended the creation of a centralized organization for casting extras and other small parts. Hays adopted this suggestion and the Central Casting Corporation was born the next year.

Really, I don't feel I've worked an hour in my whole life ... It is something I just love to do.

— Mary van Kleeck, interviewed by Helen Foster in 1926

A 1926 profile of van Kleeck in the Brooklyn Daily Eagle, focusing on her prodigy with mathematics and statistics, described her as "an unassuming woman who goes about her work in a quiet manner, who does it primarily because she loves it, and who thoroughly enjoys every minute of her existence." In response to the interviewer's description of her statistical reports as "endless labor", van Kleeck replied "Really, I don't feel I've worked an hour in my whole life ... It is something I just love to do." Some years later, a young contemporary of van Kleeck's, Jacob Fisher, would describe her as having "the patrician carriage and speech, the imperious presence and the grande dame manner of the mistress of a nineteenth-century salon."

From 1928, she was also active in the International Industrial Relations Institute, which she co-led with Mary (Mikie) Fleddérus. Prominent members of the Institute included Adelaide Anderson and Lillian Moller Gilbreth. Gilbreth, a friend, described van Kleeck as "the best research woman I know." Fleddérus, a Dutch social reformer, became van Kleeck's lifelong partner and the two women lived together for most of their later life, splitting their time evenly between the Netherlands and New York City each year and exchanging daily letters when apart. The historian Jacqueline Castledine characterizes their relationship as romantic, describing van Kleeck and Fleddérus as "women-committed women" in a time before lesbianism was acceptable in mainstream society. Such relationships, not unknown in urban communities of college-educated women, were called Boston marriages.

In 1932, as a longtime advocate of social-economic planning, van Kleeck visited the Soviet Union, which she viewed as being at the forefront of scientific management and labor rights. The next year, she was elected as a fellow of the American Association for the Advancement of Science.

== Socialism and opposition to the New Deal ==
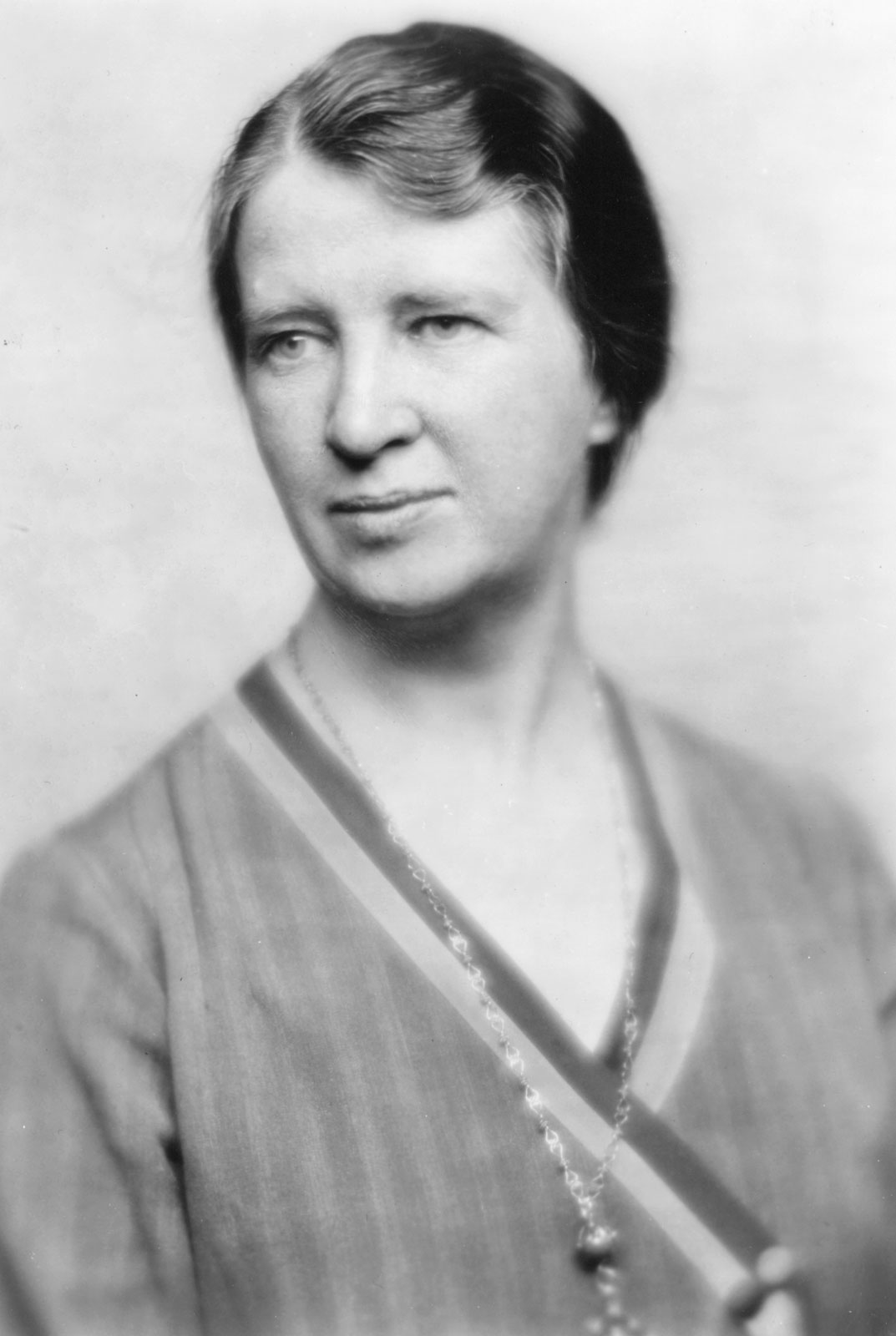
Van Kleeck in 1930, photographed at a Women's Trade Union League convention

Although several fellow social scientists and activists advocated for van Kleeck to receive a cabinet position in the new Roosevelt administration in 1933, her increasingly radical views made this unlikely. By the early 1930s, van Kleeck had become a socialist, and she opposed the Roosevelt administration's New Deal initiatives. Van Kleeck favored Soviet-style economic planning, which she was convinced would be effective in solving the USA's continuing economic issues. Her views were widely publicized, such as in a 1931 New York Times article subtitled "Mary van Kleeck Says Social Effects of World Plans Should Be Test."

Although appointed to the Federal Advisory Council of the New Deal U.S. Employment Service, she resigned in protest after one day due to her belief that the National Recovery Administration was not sufficiently supportive of unions. Van Kleeck continued to conduct labor studies and write in favor of socialist policies. Her book Miners and Management, published in 1934, was based on a study of the Rocky Mountain Fuel Company, and argued that all industry should be socialized. Her next book, Creative America, was published in 1936 and opposed continued private control of the means of production, as well as supporting a "moderate form of collectivism." Alchon writes that "for van Kleeck, Christian and Communist idealism were complementary, if not interchangeable."

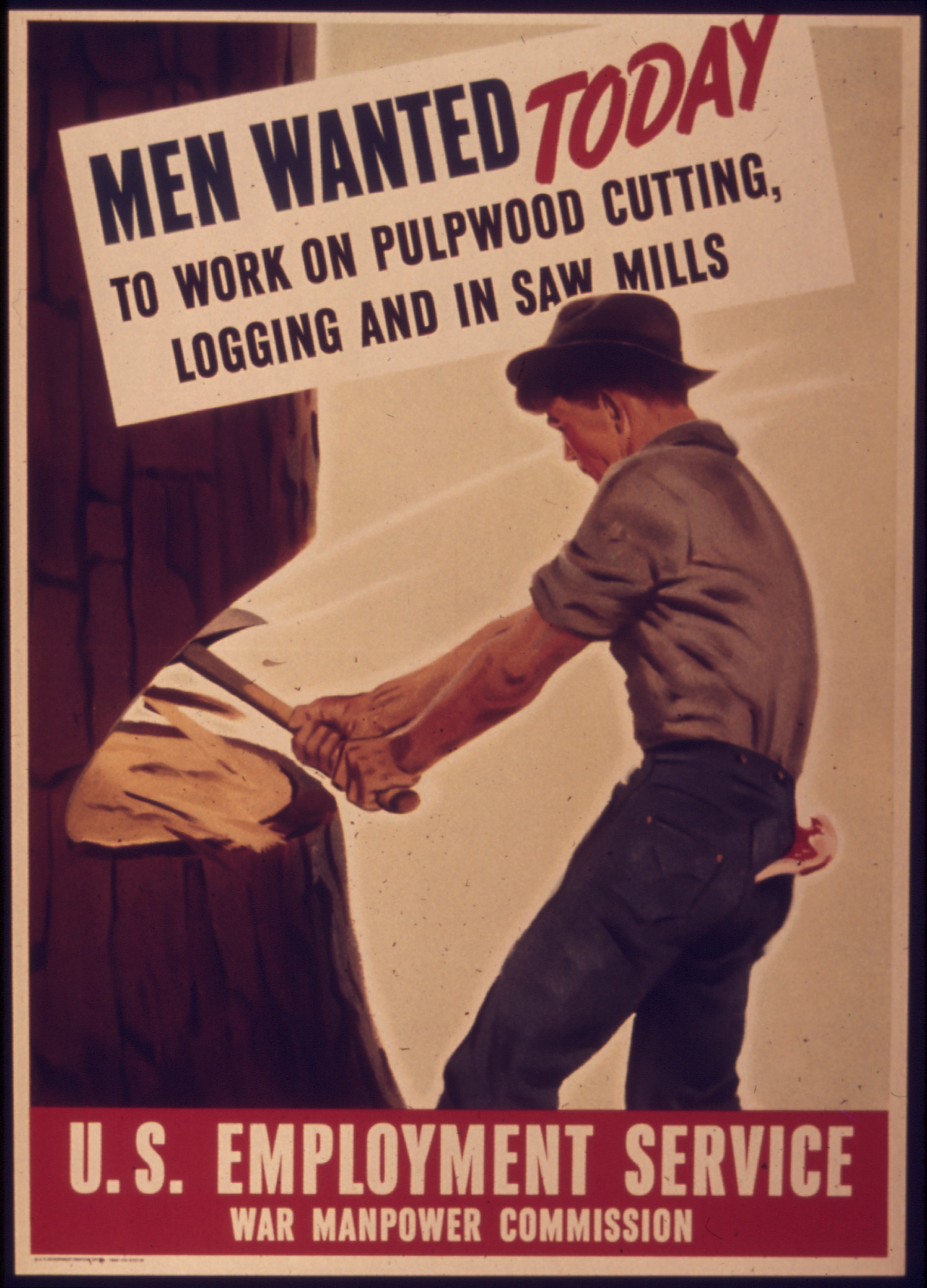
Van Kleeck resigned from an advisory position with the U.S. Employment Service due to her opposition to New Deal policies.

During the early years of the New Deal, van Kleeck was considered a leading figure of the American left, with considerable influence over the national social work movement, which advocated for progressive improvements in society. Her influence was showcased by a rapturous reception at the National Conference of Social Work (NCSW) meeting in 1934. There, she presented her paper "Our Illusions Regarding Government", arguing that social reformers must not allow themselves to be corrupted by a government controlled by capital and big business, which would "tend to protect property rights rather than human rights".

Van Kleeck's speech, delivered to a packed crowd of 1500 in a room designed for 500, was so well-received that she received the conference's top award for an outstanding paper, and was asked to present the paper again to meet the high demand from attendees to hear her work. One journalist wrote:

Never in a long experience of conferences has this observer witnessed such a prolonged ovation ... to her wearied and discouraged colleagues in social work she brought a new hope and dream when they had ceased to hope and dream, and she came in the person of an undeniable leader, clothed with the courage for a good fight. The effect on her hearers was electric.

— Gertrude Springer writing in The Survey, June 1934

This reaction alarmed more conservative members of the NCSW and led its president, William Hodson, to criticize van Kleeck's radicalism and opposition to the New Deal at the organization's annual banquet. In response, nearly 1,000 conference attendees organized to unofficially censure Hodson.

Van Kleeck was also a member of the board of directors of the American Civil Liberties Union (ACLU), heading up the Subcommittee on Labor Policy. She was affiliated with the ACLU from 1935 until 1940, when she resigned in protest after the ACLU expelled Elizabeth Gurley Flynn, one of its own founders, for belonging to the Communist Party. Van Kleeck was a supporter of civil rights for African-Americans and promoted the work of Max Yergan, arguing that the "general welfare" of the United States must "include the Negro on an equal basis."

Van Kleeck was initially opposed to American entry into World War II, viewing it as an imperialist misadventure. During the war, she continued to argue for the inclusion of women in government and the labor force. In 1944, van Kleeck co-wrote a book with Mary Fleddérus, entitled Technology and Livelihood. The book argued that increased technological innovation and efficiency inevitably lead to increased unemployment and underemployment, and suggested a strong welfare state and labor movement as the necessary remedy to this problem. Known for her prewar contributions to labor statistics, van Kleeck became a Fellow of the American Statistical Association in 1945.

== Retirement ==
Van Kleeck retired from the Sage Foundation in 1948, having earned a salary of $8,808 in her final year with the organization. She ran for New York State Senate the same year as a member of the far-left American Labor Party in Manhattan's 20th District, against incumbent Republican MacNeil Mitchell and Democrat Evelyn B. Richman. In the last year of prominence for the American Labor Party, van Kleeck won 14,284 votes (10.01%), compared to Mitchell's 76,519 and Richman's 51,916. After the loss, she turned her focus to anti-nuclear activism and disarmament work. Van Kleeck also assisted in the founding of the Congress of American Women (CAW), an important institution in the post-war peace movement; she and Susan B. Anthony II disagreed on whether the organization should emphasize the family as the special concern of women. Arguing that the CAW should focus on women not just as homemakers but as workers, van Kleeck invited Mary McLeod Bethune to present on discrimination against African-American women.

Although she never publicly joined the Communist Party, van Kleeck became a defender of the Soviet Union, believing it to represent the world's only viable alternative to capitalism. As a result, she came under government suspicion and sustained FBI surveillance as a 'fellow traveler' and possible secret member of the Communist Party, although no evidence of membership was ever presented. Congressional committees investigating communism listed her as a member of up to 60 different "subversive" organizations that they considered possible fronts for communism. Several times, van Kleeck was denied a visa to travel abroad. As an openly dedicated socialist, van Kleeck was called before Joseph McCarthy's Senate Permanent Subcommittee on Investigations in 1953, where she was represented by civil rights lawyer Leonard Boudin and questioned by Roy Cohn. An excerpt from that questioning follows:

Mr. COHN: Are you a believer in our form of government today?

Miss VAN KLEECK: Emphatically. I am an American with a long family background going back to the early days, and my whole work is devoted to the United States of America.

Mr. COHN: My question was: You are a believer in the capitalist form of government?

Miss VAN KLEECK: Is the United States essentially and forever capitalist? It has changed its form of organization through the years. I am a believer in political democracy, which is the essence of the United States of America.

— Transcript from US Senate hearing, March 25, 1953

What interests me in my life is my work, for it was my unusual and blessed destiny to be involved with subjects of immense importance.

— Mary van Kleeck, in response to a 1957 suggestion that she write an autobiography

In 1956, on the recommendation of Eleanor Flexner, van Kleeck began organizing her papers and turning them over to the Sophia Smith Collection at her alma mater, with the assistance of Margaret Storrs Grierson. Van Kleeck had been uncertain whether her documents were of value, saying that "to write about [national issues] with merely me as the unifying element would belittle them to the vanishing point," but came around to believe that "the collection, if properly arranged, would be the most useful biography."

Throughout her retirement, she lived with her longtime romantic companion Mary "Mikie" Fleddérus in a "shambling old house" in Woodstock, New York. Described by contemporaries as a serious, brilliant, and quiet person, van Kleeck played tennis and bridge and was a fan of theater and comedy sketches. A lifelong Christian, van Kleeck was a member of the Episcopal League for Social Action and served as a "leading light" in the Society of the Companions of the Holy Cross, an Episcopal women's organization, in the words of Alchon. Van Kleeck died of heart failure on June 8, 1972, in Kingston, New York. She was 88.

== Sources ==
- Alchon, Guy (1992). "Mary van Kleeck and Scientific Management". In Nelson, Daniel (ed.). A Mental Revolution: Scientific Management since Taylor (PDF). Columbus, Ohio: Ohio State University Press. pp. 1–23. hdl:1811/6191. ISBN 978-0-8142-0567-9.
- Alchon, Guy (1998). "The "Self-Applauding Sincerity" of Overreaching Theory, Biography as Ethical Practice, and the Case of Mary van Kleeck". In Silverberg, Helene (ed.). Gender and American Social Science: the Formative Years. Princeton, NJ: Princeton University Press. pp. 293–326. ISBN 978-0-691-01749-5. OCLC 37806197.
- Andrews, Janice; Reisch, Michael (2002). The Road Not Taken: A History of Radical Social Work in the United States. Psychology Press. ISBN 978-0-415-93399-5.
- Dutchess County Historical Society (1938). Year Book of the Dutchess County Historical Society. New York: The Society. OCLC 228773633.
- Hendrickson, Mark (2013). American Labor and Economic Citizenship: New Capitalism from World War I to the Great Depression. Cambridge University Press. ISBN 978-1-107-02860-9.
- Kaufman, Bruce E. (2004). The Global Evolution of Industrial Relations: Events, Ideas and the IIRA. International Labour Organization. ISBN 978-92-2-114153-2.
- Richardson, Theresa R.; Fisher, Donald, eds. (1999). The Development of the Social Sciences in the United States and Canada : the Role of Philanthropy. Stamford, Conn.: Ablex Pub. Corp. ISBN 978-1-56750-405-7. OCLC 39300048.
- O'Connor, Alice (2007). Social Science for What?: Philanthropy and the Social Question in a World Turned Rightside Up. New York City: Russell Sage Foundation. ISBN 978-1-61044-430-9.
- Reef, Catherine (2007). Working in America. New York: Facts on File. ISBN 978-1-4381-0814-8. OCLC 234178110.
- Ware, Susan (1989). Partner and I: Molly Dewson, Feminism, and New Deal Politics. Yale University Press. ISBN 978-0-300-04621-2.
