= List of National Natural Landmarks in Nebraska =

There are 5 National Natural Landmarks in Nebraska.

Nebraska National Natural Landmarks (clickable map)

Name	Image	Date	Location	County	Ownership	Description
Ashfall Fossil Beds		2006	Orchard42.440556°N 98.148083°W	Antelope	state historical park	A rare example of a lagerstätten, a thick bed of volcanic ash, contains hundreds of extraordinarily complete skeletons of extinct mammals.
Dissected Loess Plains		1987		Lincoln	mixed- state, private	Eroded canyons and deep valleys in loess deposits over 200 feet (61 m) thick
Fontenelle Forest		1964	41.18°N 95.917778°W	Sarpy	private	The largest virgin forest in Nebraska.
Nebraska Sand Hills	Nebraska Sand Hills	1984	42.13°N 102.19°W	Nebraska	mixed- state, private	The largest sand dunes complex in the Western Hemisphere.
Valentine National Wildlife Refuge	Valentine National Wildlife Refuge	1976	42.493611°N 100.572778°W	Cherry	federal	Sandhill tall grass prairie ecosystem unique to the central Great Plains.

== See also ==
- List of National Historic Landmarks in Nebraska
