= International Industrial Relations Institute =

International Industrial Relations Institute was an international organisation that existed from 1925 to 1947.

The first proposal to establish an organisation for the "study and improvement of human conditions in industry" arose in the First International Conference on Industrial Welfare at the Chateau d' Argeronne, Argonne, France in 1922.

The institute was led by Mary van Kleeck, an American social reformer, and Mary Fleddérus, a Dutch activist, and approached scientific management from a particular perspective: what they termed the human factor. From the outset it had close links with women's organisations such as the World Young Women's Christian Association and the Women's Trade Union League.

It was founded by four distinct groups of activists:

1. State employed women factory inspectors
2. World Young Women's Christian Association activists involved in industrial reform
3. women employed by industrial welfare units
4. enlightened industrialists employing large numbers of women

== Congresses ==
=== First Congress, Vlissingen 1925 ===
The first congress was held in Vlissingen in 1925. This was entitled "The International Industrial Welfare (Personnel) Congress". The institute was established and agreed to fold a congress every third year. Kerstin Hesselgren was elected president with three vice presidents: Cees van der Leeuw, the Dutch industrialist, Renée de Montmort from France, and Louise Odencrantz from the USA.

=== Second Congress, Cambridge 1928 ===
The Second Congress was held in Girton College Cambridge, 27 June – 2 July. It was attended by over 100 delegates from 20 countries. The theme was the "Fundamental Relationships between all Sections of the Industrial Community." Kerstin Hesselgren resigned as president and Dorothy Cadbury as Treasurer. Cees van der Leeuw became the new president with Charles E. Jacob as treasurer. A two volume report was published: Report of first triennial congress held at Cambridge (England) July 1928, on the subject of fundamental relationships between all sections of the industrial community.

=== Third Congress, August 23–29, Amsterdam 1931 ===
The World Social Economic Congress was held at the, 23–29 August 1931, Amsterdam The organisation sponsored Otto Neurath's presentation "Das gegenwärtige Wachstum der Produktionskapazität der Welt" at the Amsterdam conference of 1931. Van Kleeck was the institute's associate director from 1928 to 1946. Over 200 participants came from over 26 countries to discuss how social-economic planning could affect industrial relations. Valerian Osinsky led a delegation from the Soviet Union. Samuil Ronin, A. J. Gayster, Ivan Kraval were other members of the delegation.

== Prominent members ==
- Adelaide Anderson
- Kerstin Hesselgren
- Lillian Moller Gilbreth
- Charles Samuel Myers
