= Fledderus =

Fledderus or Fleddérus is a surname. Notable people with the surname include:

- Mark-Jan Fledderus (born 1982), Dutch footballer
- Marrit Fledderus (born 2001), Dutch speed skater
- Mary Fleddérus (1886–1977), Dutch social scientist
- Riëtte Fledderus (born 1977), Dutch volleyball player
