= Louise Odencrantz =

American social scientist and labour economist

Louise C. Odencrantz (22 August 1884, Gothenburg, Nebraska – 7 April 1969, New York City) was an American social scientist. She was an empirical labor economist who focused on women’s labor force experience.

== Education and early career ==
Born in rural Nebraska, where her Scandinavian immigrant parents were homesteading, Odencrantz moved with them first to Texas, then to New York City. She attended the Morris High School in the Bronx and won a scholarship to Barnard College. While majoring in Latin because she expected to become a teacher, she took several economics courses from Columbia professors whose ideas shaped U.S. economic and social policies during the twentieth century. Inspired by them and by female speakers at campus events, who emphasized that, even without the suffrage, women could work for social justice, she applied for a fellowship to the College Settlement on Rivington Street, one of the settlement houses that were opening in American cities to serve the growing immigrant population. After gaining her B.A. in 1907, she enrolled in graduate courses at Columbia University, and, while staying at the settlement on the Lower East Side, investigated the conditions of women working in local factories. She earned her M.A. in social sciences in 1908. Survey, a national journal that featured the work of leading social scientists and reformers, published her thesis, “The Irregularity of Employment of Women Factory Workers,” in May 1909 with photographs by Lewis Hine, one of the major documentary photographers of the century. After completing her degree, Odencrantz joined the staff of the Russell Sage Foundation in 1908. Under the guidance of Mary Van Kleeck, head of the Foundation's Committee on Women’s Work, she and other researchers studied the millinery industry, the bookbinding trade, artificial flower-making and working girls in evening schools. She also directed a study of Italian women in industry, published under her name, and took part in an investigation of industrial conditions in Springfield, Illinois.

== Employment services and personnel work ==
From 1915 to 1919, Odencrantz served as superintendent of New York State’s first public employment bureau for women, where she developed effective procedures and connected thousands of women with jobs—many in non-traditional fields. U.S. entry into World War I increased the need for female labor and expanded the scope of her activities to include Federal employment services in the state. When funding for public employment bureaus declined, Odencrantz took a position in private industry as personnel manager for a silk manufacturer. She helped settle a strike with an agreement that recognized the interests of both workers and employers and was acknowledged by the U.S. Department of Labor as a model of its kind. At a time when the country had turned isolationist, she joined colleagues in founding the International Industrial Relations Institute and attended several conferences in Europe( in 1922, 1925 and 1928) ; in 1925 she was elected vice president of the organization. After the silk factory closed, she produced a job study of social work, directed an employment agency for disabled workers, and became a strong advocate for the inclusion of this marginalized group. During the 1930s, Frances Perkins recruited her to serve on state and federal commissions on unemployment measures; she helped prepare guidelines for implementation of the Wagner-Peyser Act of 1933, contributed to a study of public employment services in the United States for the Social Science Research Council, and served as head of training for the New York State Department of Labor, Division of Placement and Unemployment Insurance from 1937-1941.[2]

== Active retirement ==
In 1946, Odencrantz retired from her final position as executive director of the Social Work Vocational Bureau. She remained active in the Democratic Party and other causes that had engaged her throughout her life, volunteered for domestic organizations, and supported international associations including the Women's International League for Peace and Freedom and the United World Federalists.

== Works ==
- "Irregularity of employment of women factory workers, Survey, 21: 196-210. 1909.
- Italian Women in Industry: A Study of Conditions in New York City (1915)
- Industrial Conditions in Springfield, Illinois (1915) with Zenas L. Potter
- The Social Worker in Family, Medical and Psychiatric Social Work (1927)
- Public Employment Services in the United States (1938).

=== Books by Mary Van Kleeck to which Odencrantz contributed ===
- Women in the Bookbinding Trade https://www.russellsage.org/sites/default/files/Van%20Kleek_Women%20in%20bookbinding_0.pdf (1913)
- Artificial Flower Makers https://www.russellsage.org/artificial-flower-makers (1913)
- Working Girls in Evening Schools https://www.russellsage.org/working-girls-evening-schools (1914)
- A Seasonal Industry: A Study of the Millinery Trade in New York https://www.russellsage.org/seasonal-industry (1917)
