= Robert Henri Museum =

Museum in Nebraska

Hendee Hotel building, seen in 2026

Archives building, seen in 2026

Gallery building, seen in 2026

The Robert Henri Museum is an art and history museum in Cozad, Nebraska that contains sketches, drawings, and paintings by Robert Henri. The Museum is located in Henri's former home. The Henri Museum is a non-profit educational 501(c)(3) organization.

== Museum collection ==
The Henri Museum art collection includes Henri's painting Mariana of Austria, Queen of Spain, which is a copy of the c. 1652 painting by Diego Velázquez. It was donated to the Museum by Janet LeClair in 1988. In 2018, the gallery displays more than 33 drawings, seven paintings, and other items belonging to the artist. A 2017 addition to the collection was Normandie Interior, which Henri completed in 1897. The painting was part of Henri’s first solo exhibition and bought by Frank Southern, the artist’s brother, and kept in the family for the next 120 years.

Aside from Henri's works, the Henri Museum also houses items owned by the Cozad family that relate to the history of Cozad. The town was founded by Henri's father, John Jackson Cozad.

== History ==
The Henri Museum building was originally a house that was built by John Jackson Cozad in 1873. In 1883, Cozad shot a local rancher named Alfred Pearson in Cozad. This shooting resulted from in a dispute over cattle that later escalated in a shouting match, a brawl and gun violence. The mortally wounded Pearson died a month later.

After the shooting, Cozad fled town for Denver. Although Cozad was acquitted in the killing, his wife and sons soon sold the house and left town forever. To escape notoriety, son Robert Henry Cozad changed his name to Robert Henri.

The Cozad house later became the home of artist Miles Maryott. He was described by the Omaha World-Herald as “a well-known hunting guide, outdoorsman and landscape painter — there was talk he would become the first-ever Nebraska state naturalist — before he pulled a gun on his best friend and changed his own life”.

The Henri Museum was founded by a women's coalition led by Shirley Paulsen. The coalition purchased the Cozad house, then known as the Hendee Hotel. They also purchased an adjacent historical walkway, a Pony Express Station, an historical church, and a schoolhouse. The coalition purchased the property with donations from the Henri and Cozad families and other local residents.

The Hendee Hotel building was listed on the National Register of Historic Places in 1979.

In 2014, the Henri Museum built a new gallery to display its Henri paintings and sketches. As part of the project the museum installed a quality climate control and security system.

== Artist-in-residence program ==
The museum sponsors an artist-in-residence program.

== Gallery ==
Modeling props used by Henri, on display in the Hendee Hotel

View of the gallery space

View of the gallery space

== See also ==
- List of single-artist museums
- Cozad Downtown Historic District
