= Ira Webster Olive House =

- U.S. National Register of Historic Places
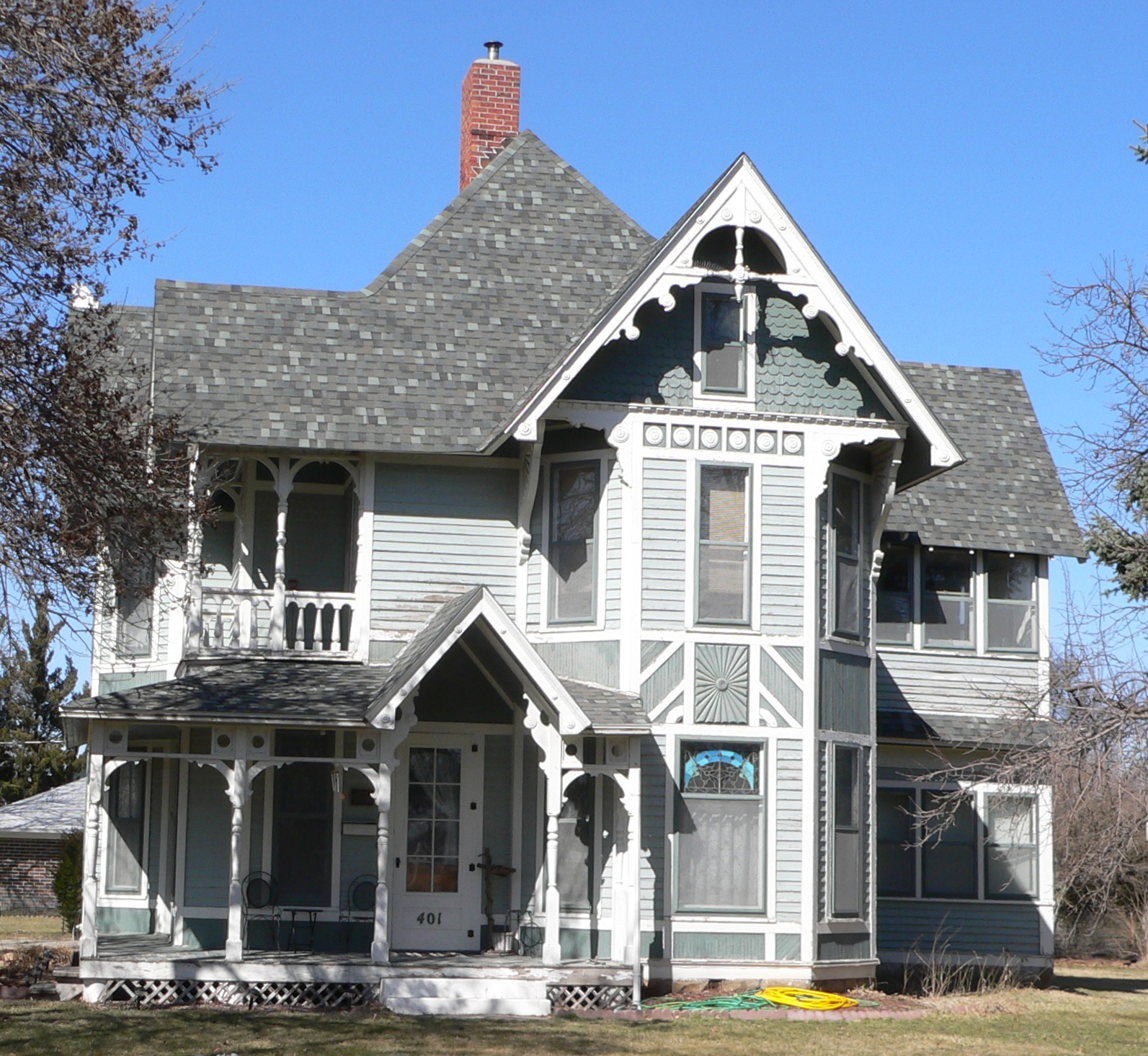
- The house in 2010

- Location within Nebraska Location within the United States
- Location: 401 East 13th Street, Lexington, Nebraska
- Coordinates: 40°47′13″N 99°44′10″W
- Area: less than one acre
- Built: 1889
- Built by: Harry H. Mills
- Architectural style: Queen Anne
- NRHP reference No.: 89002042
- Added to NRHP: November 27, 1989

The Ira Webster Olive House is a historic two-story house in Lexington, Nebraska. It was built by Harry H. Mills in 1889-1890 for Ira Webster Olive, a cattleman, banker and businessman from Texas who lived in the house until his death in 1928. The house was designed in the Queen Anne style. It has been listed on the National Register of Historic Places since November 27, 1989.
