= Samuil Ronin =

Samuil Lazarevich Ronin (Russian: Самуил Лазаревич Ронин; 10 February 1910 – ) was a Soviet Jewish social scientist born in Korets, Poland (now Ukraine).

He graduated from Moscow State University in 1930 and took part in the Soviet delegation to the World Social Economy Congress in the Netherlands, 1931.

In 1962, he wrote a pamphlet with I. P. Tsamerian entitled Equality of Rights between Races and Nationalities in the USSR. When it was published by UNESCO, the accuracy of the pamphlet was disputed by The Spectator.
