= Cozad Downtown Historic District =

- U.S. National Register of Historic Places
- U.S. Historic district
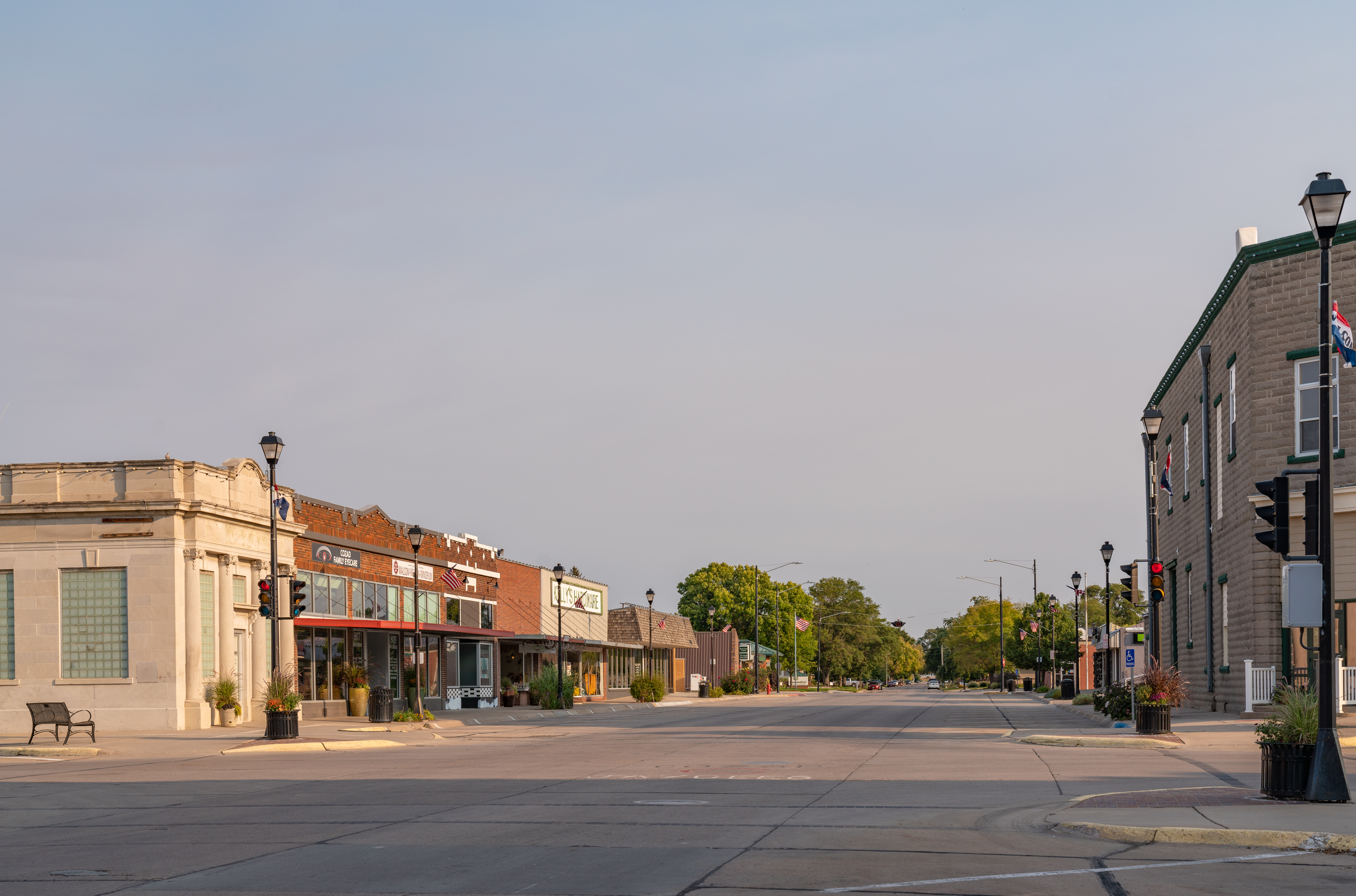

- Location within Nebraska Location within the United States
- Location: Roughly bounded by 9th, 7th, H & F Sts., Cozad, Nebraska
- Coordinates: 40.8596°N 99.9859°W
- MPS: Lincoln Highway in Nebraska MPS
- NRHP reference No.: 100003093
- Added to NRHP: November 5, 2018

The Cozad Downtown Historic District in Cozad, Nebraska is a historic district which was listed on the National Register of Historic Places in 2018.

The Hendee Hotel in Cozad, built in 1879 for John J. Cozad, the founder of the city of Cozad, is not included in the district (in fact is just outside of its borders) but is already listed on the National Register.

The listing included 37 contributing resources and one already-listed property.

The district is generally described by History Nebraska:

In the 1910s and 1920s, the original route of the Lincoln Highway passed through downtown Cozad greatly influencing its development until rerouted south of downtown in 1926. The district contains an intact collection of late-nineteenth- and early-to-mid-twentieth-century commercial buildings that reflect seven decades of commercial development in Cozad.

The already-listed building was Allen's Opera House. Not included was the NRHP-listed Hendee Hotel a.k.a. Robert Henri Museum, a few doors away. The 100th Meridian Museum appears to be adjacent (see https://www.cozadhistory.org ) but is not NRHP-listed.

Selected buildings in the district are:

- Allen's Opera House (1906), 100 E. 8th St.
- Atkinson Building (1890), 711-715 Meridian Avenue, the oldest building in the district
- Brown and Bennison Building (1897), 746 Meridian Avenue, with 1905 addition stretching down 8th street to 113 East 8th Street.
