= Hendee Hotel =

- U.S. National Register of Historic Places
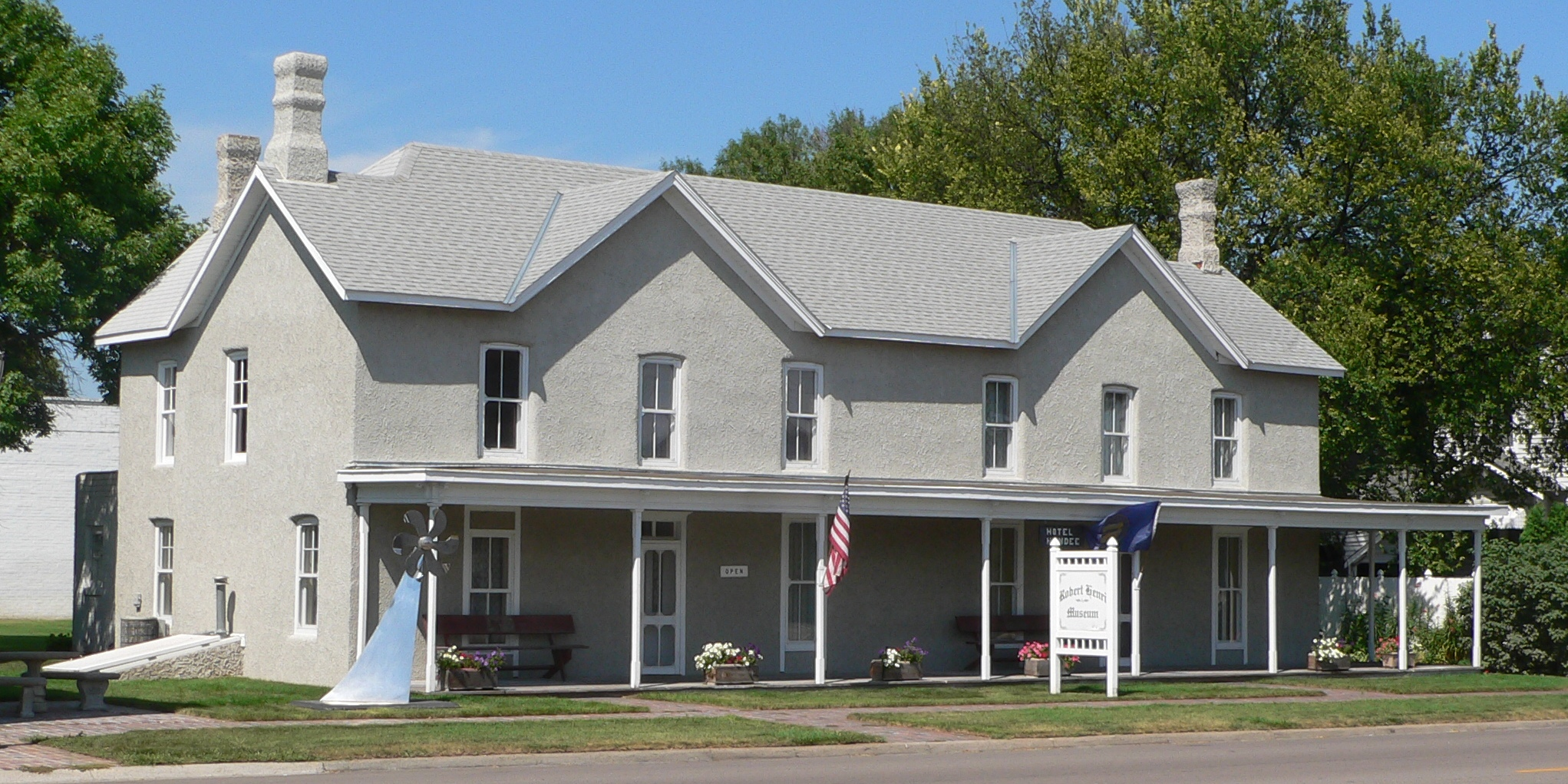
- The Robert Henri Museum in 2010

- Location within Nebraska Location within the United States
- Location: 220 E. 8th St., Cozad, Nebraska
- Coordinates: 40°51′35″N 99°58′58″W
- Area: less than one acre
- Built: 1879
- NRHP reference No.: 79001436
- Added to NRHP: March 21, 1979

The Hendee Hotel is a historic hotel building in Cozad, Nebraska. It was built in 1879 for John J. Cozad, the founder of the city of Cozad. One of his sons, Robert Henri, became a painter. Cozad shot a man in 1882, and he sold the hotel to Stephen A. Hendee, who remained its owner until 1910. From 1883 to 1885, it was rented to A. K. Maryott, whose son was painter Miles Maryott. The building has been listed on the National Register of Historic Places since March 21, 1979.

It is the main building of the Robert Henri Museum.

It is close to, but not included in, the Cozad Downtown Historic District, which was listed on the National Register in 2018.
