= Midway Stage Station =

- U.S. National Register of Historic Places
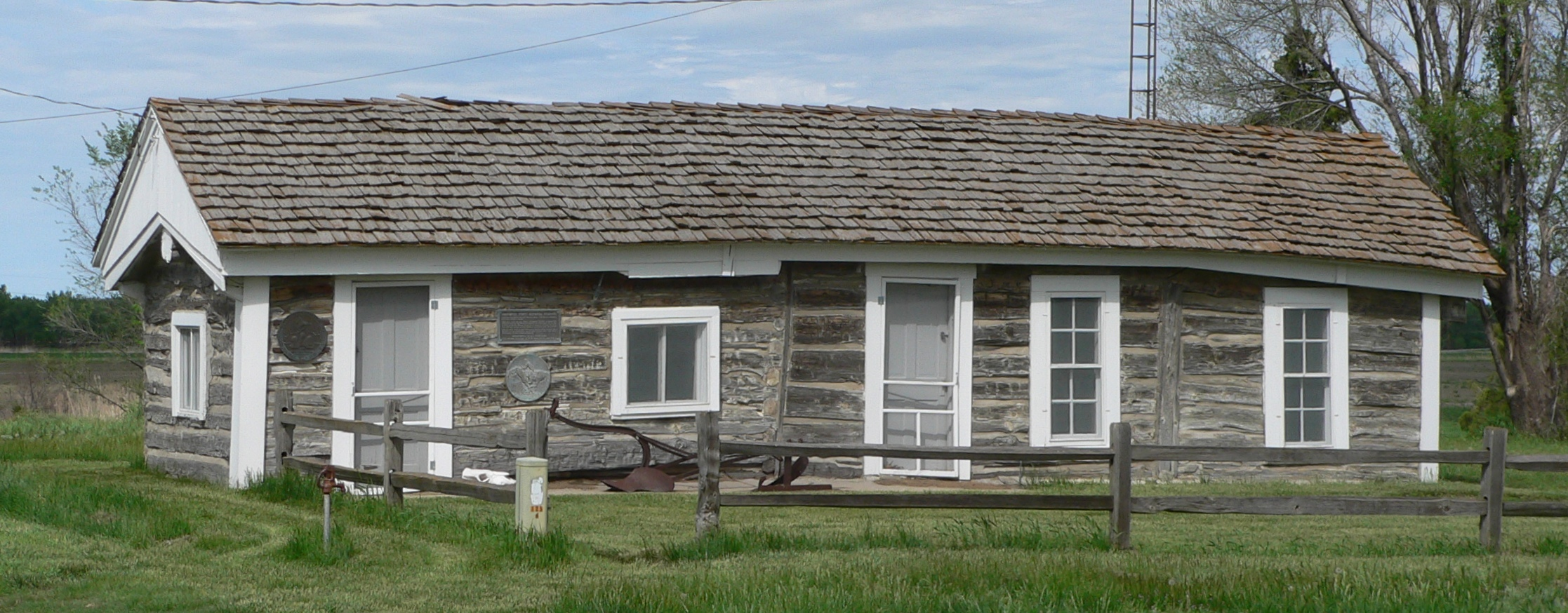
- The building in 2010

- Location within Nebraska Location within the United States
- Nearest city: Gothenburg, Nebraska
- Coordinates: 40°53′07″N 100°08′51″W
- Area: 1 acre (0.40 ha)
- Built: 1859
- NRHP reference No.: 69000372
- Added to NRHP: October 15, 1969

The Midway Stage Station is a historic building in Gothenburg, Nebraska. It was built in 1859, and expanded in 1860–1861. Initially built as a station for the Leavenworth City & Pike's Peak Express Company, it served as a station for the Pony Express from the 1860s to the late 1870s. In 1879, it was purchased by Henry Laurens Williams, who turned the building into a cabin on his Lower 96 Ranch. By the 1960s, the ranch had been inherited by his grandson. It has been listed on the National Register of Historic Places since October 15, 1969.
