= Ernest A. Calling House =

- U.S. National Register of Historic Places
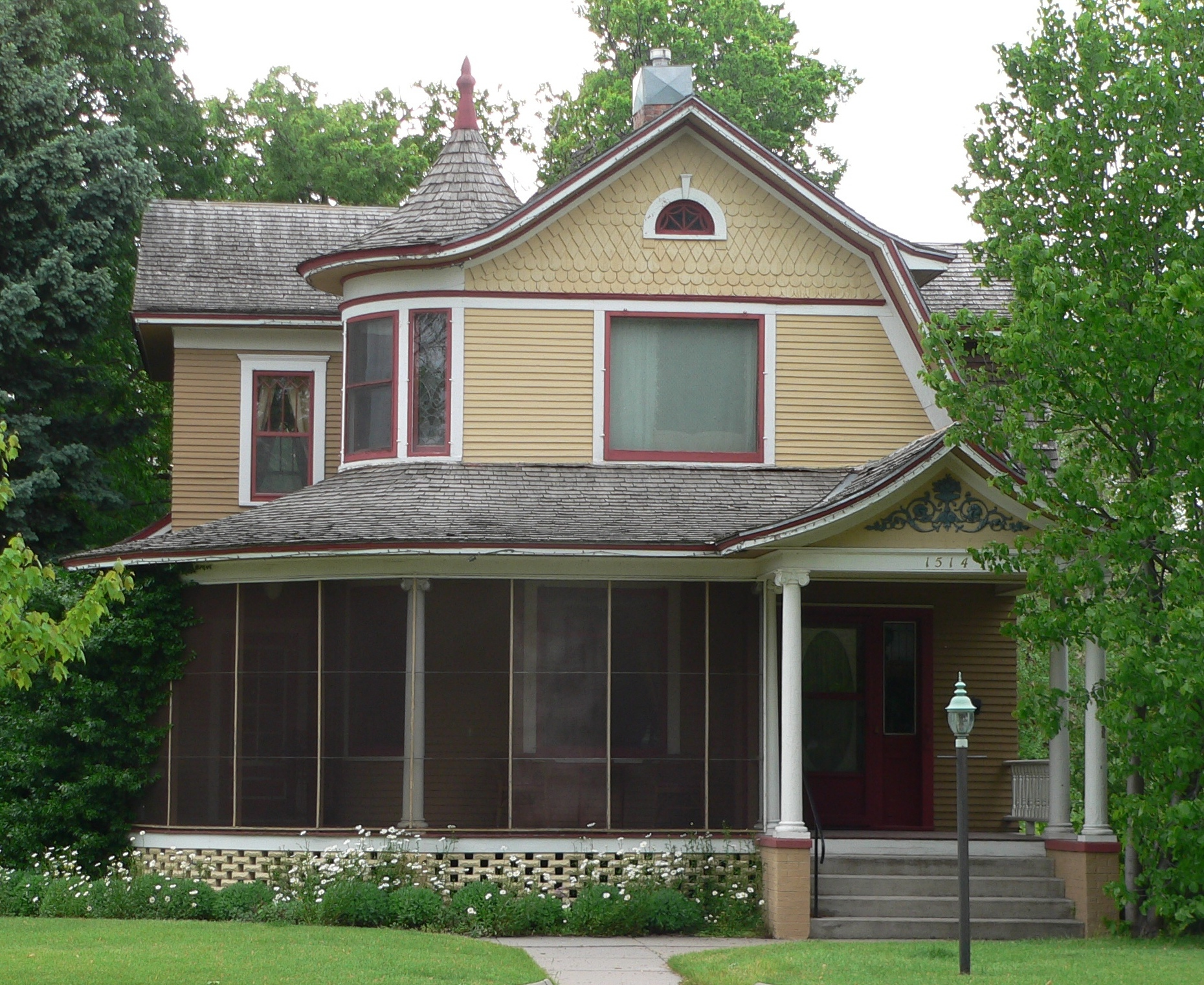
- The house in 2010

- Location within Nebraska Location within the United States
- Location: 1514 Lake Avenue, Gothenburg, Nebraska
- Coordinates: 40°56′00″N 100°09′36″W
- Area: less than one acre
- Built: 1907
- Built by: L. J. Anderson
- Architectural style: Queen Anne
- NRHP reference No.: 79001437
- Added to NRHP: October 25, 1979

The Ernest A. Calling House is a historic house in Gothenburg, Nebraska. It was built by L. J. Anderson in 1907 for Ernest A. Calling, an immigrant from Sweden who first arrived in the United States in 1889, became a businessman in Gothenburg, and died in 1945. It was designed in the Queen Anne style. It has been listed on the National Register of Historic Places since October 25, 1979.
