= Cees van der Leeuw =

Dutch industrial (1890–1973)

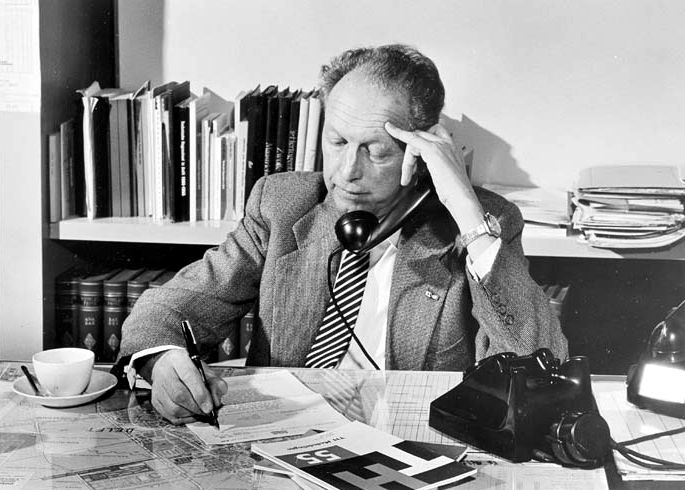
Dr. C.H. van der Leeuw, 1962

Cees (Cornelis) Hendrik van der Leeuw, (15 March 1890, Rotterdam – 19 May 1973) was a Dutch industrialist and subsequently psychiatrist. He is also noted for commissioning the Van Nelle Factory. He was a representative of the reconstruction of Rotterdam following World War II. He was also a pioneer in the field of modernism in the Netherlands, designing many modern pieces of art. For this reason, he is an important and recognized figure when it comes to Dutch architecture.

In 1925 he was elected vice-president of the International Industrial Relations Institute, becoming president in 1928. He had various roles within museums and universities in Rotterdam.

In 1946 he was appointed curator at the Institute of Technology, Delft.
