= Allen's Opera House =

- U.S. National Register of Historic Places
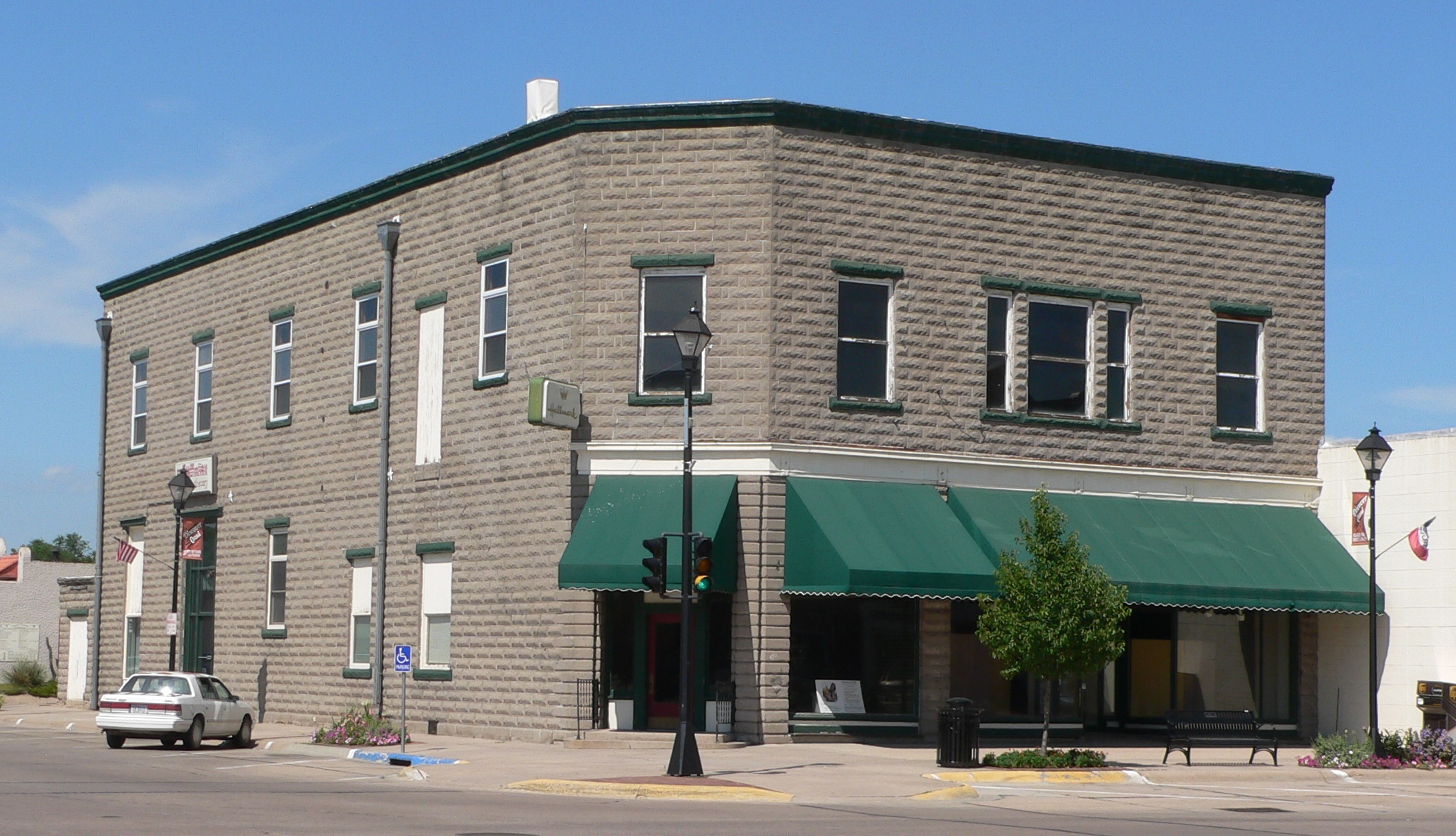
- The building in 2010

- Location within Nebraska Location within the United States
- Location: 100 East Eighth, Cozad, Nebraska
- Coordinates: 40°51′35″N 99°59′07″W
- Area: less than one acre
- Built: 1906
- Built by: Charles Hart, Mr. Shanholt
- Architectural style: Two-part commercial block
- MPS: Opera House Buildings in Nebraska 1867-1917 MPS
- NRHP reference No.: 88000951
- Added to NRHP: September 28, 1988

Allen's Opera House is a historic commercial building in Cozad, Nebraska. It was built by Charles Hart and Mr. Shanholt in 1906 for Charles E. Allen, a businessman and banker who co-owned the Cozad State Bank and the Allen General Store. Both businesses were located on the first floor. The building has been listed on the National Register of Historic Places since September 28, 1988.
