= Cozad, Nebraska =

- City
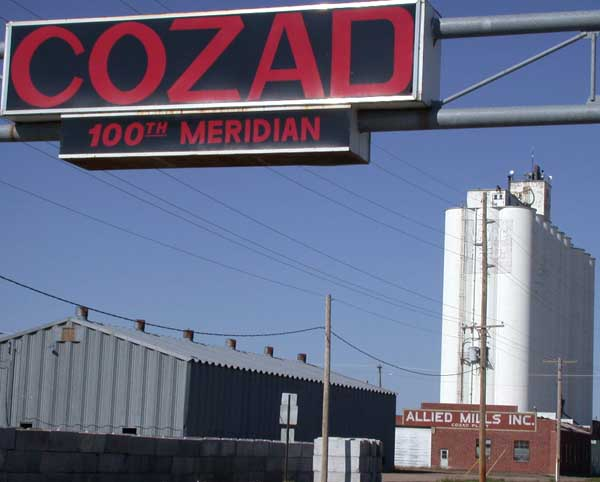
- Sign marking the 100th meridian on U.S. Highway 30 in Cozad

- Location of Cozad, Nebraska
- Coordinates: 40°51′41″N 99°59′11″W
- Country: United States
- State: Nebraska
- County: Dawson

Area
  - Total: 2.61 sq mi (6.77 km^{2})
  - Land: 2.61 sq mi (6.77 km^{2})
  - Water: 0 sq mi (0.00 km^{2})
- Elevation: 2,494 ft (760 m)

Population (2020)
  - Total: 3,988
  - Density: 1,524.6/sq mi (588.64/km^{2})
- Time zone: UTC-6 (Central (CST))
  - Summer (DST): UTC-5 (CDT)
- ZIP code: 69130
- Area code: 308
- FIPS code: 31-11020
- GNIS feature ID: 2393659
- Website: cozadnebraska.net

Cozad is a city in Dawson County, Nebraska, United States. As of the 2020 census, Cozad had a population of 3,988. The town is on the Great Plains of central Nebraska, along the Union Pacific Railroad and U.S. Route 30, just north of the Platte River. The 100th meridian, which roughly marks the eastward boundary of the arid plains, passes just west of the town as is marked nearby on a prominent sign across U.S. 30. In the early 1860s, the meridian was a stop along the Pony Express.

== History ==
Cozad was founded in 1873 by John Jackson Cozad, murderer, gambler, Ohio native, and father of painter Robert Henri. Cozad was often regarded as immoral among the citizens of the early town. He purchased 40,000 acres of land from the Union Pacific Railroad and laid out the future town. He built houses on some of the land to entice people to settle. He sold off most of the land to future residents who named the town after him. Cozad also founded Cozaddale, Ohio, a small, unincorporated village 25 miles northeast of Cincinnati.

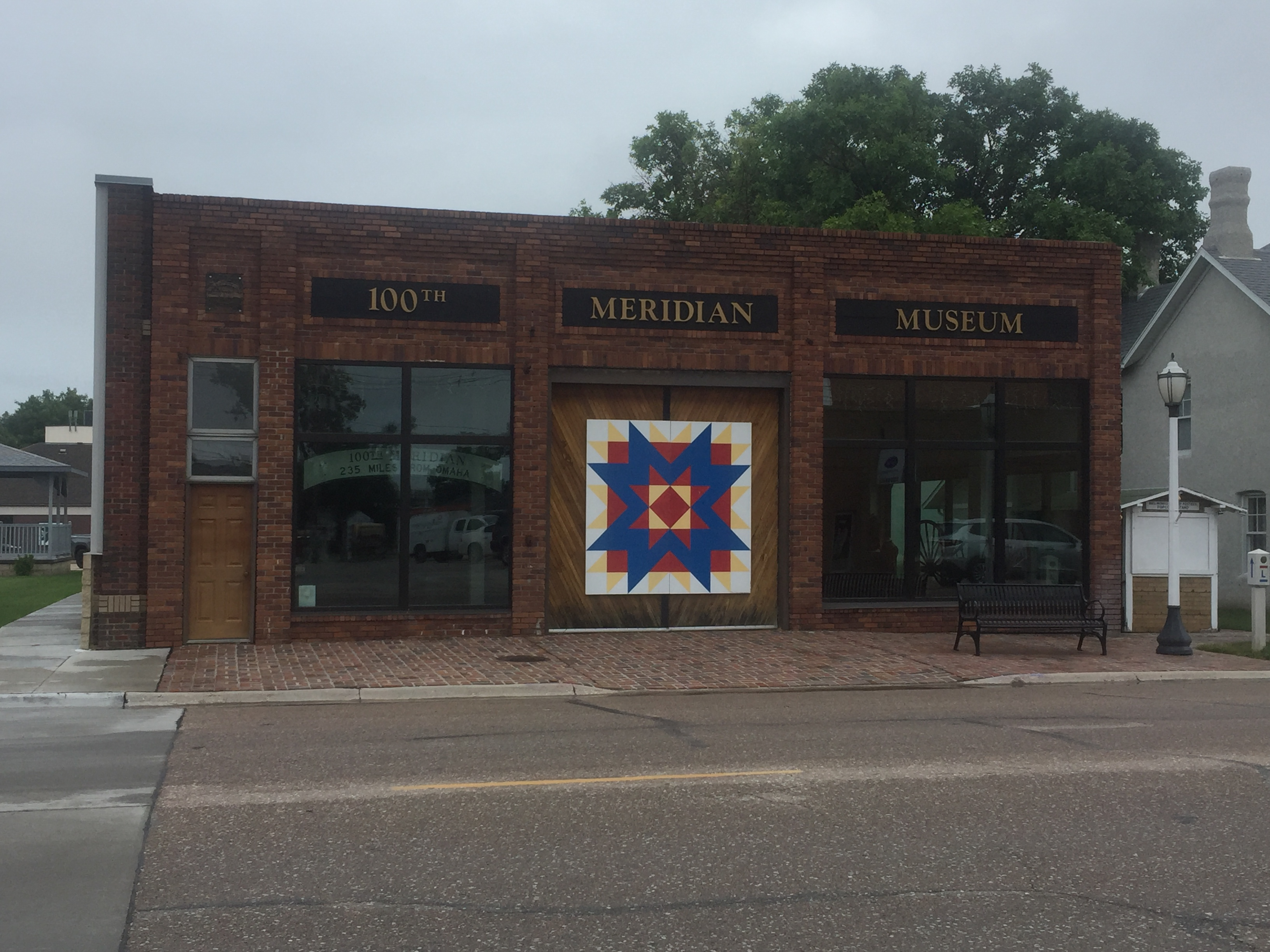
100th Meridian Museum

The city includes at least two museums: the 100th Meridian Museum and the Robert Henri Museum.

The Cozad Downtown Historic District, an area roughly bounded by 9th, 7th, H and F Streets, was listed on the National Register of Historic Places in 2018. The Hendee Hotel, today the main building of the Robert Henri Museum, and Allen's Opera House are also NRHP-listed.

== Geography ==
According to the United States Census Bureau, the city has a total area of 2.62 square miles (6.79 km^{2}), all land.

== Demographics ==
Historical population
Census	Pop.	Note	%±
1890	542		—
1900	739		36.3%
1910	1,096		48.3%
1920	1,293		18.0%
1930	1,813		40.2%
1940	2,156		18.9%
1950	2,910		35.0%
1960	3,184		9.4%
1970	4,225		32.7%
1980	4,453		5.4%
1990	3,823		−14.1%
2000	4,163		8.9%
2010	3,977		−4.5%
2020	3,988		0.3%
U.S. Decennial Census; 2012 Estimate

Cozad is part of the Lexington, Nebraska Micropolitan Statistical Area.

=== 2020 census ===
As of the 2020 census, Cozad had a population of 3,988. The median age was 38.7 years. 26.0% of residents were under the age of 18 and 19.8% of residents were 65 years of age or older. For every 100 females there were 99.9 males, and for every 100 females age 18 and over there were 97.1 males age 18 and over.

0.0% of residents lived in urban areas, while 100.0% lived in rural areas.

There were 1,669 households in Cozad, of which 31.6% had children under the age of 18 living in them. Of all households, 44.7% were married-couple households, 21.4% were households with a male householder and no spouse or partner present, and 26.8% were households with a female householder and no spouse or partner present. About 33.7% of all households were made up of individuals and 15.2% had someone living alone who was 65 years of age or older.

There were 1,849 housing units, of which 9.7% were vacant. The homeowner vacancy rate was 3.1% and the rental vacancy rate was 10.1%.

Racial composition as of the 2020 census
Race	Number	Percent
White	3,305	82.9%
Black or African American	19	0.5%
American Indian and Alaska Native	16	0.4%
Asian	48	1.2%
Native Hawaiian and Other Pacific Islander	25	0.6%
Some other race	289	7.2%
Two or more races	286	7.2%
Hispanic or Latino (of any race)	611	15.3%

=== 2010 census ===
As of the 2010 census, there were 3,977 people in 1,656 households, including 1,058 families, in the city. The population density was 1,517.9 inhabitants per square mile (586.1/km^{2}). There were 1,881 housing units at an average density of 717.9 per square mile (277.2/km^{2}). The racial makeup of the city was 92.4% White, 0.4% African American, 0.4% Native American, 0.3% Asian, 5.2% from other races, and 1.3% from two or more races. Hispanic or Latino of any race were 13.3%.

Of the 1,656 households 33.1% had children under the age of 18 living with them, 47.8% were married couples living together, 10.3% had a female householder with no husband present, 5.9% had a male householder with no wife present, and 36.1% were non-families. 31.6% of households were one person and 15.4% were one person aged 65 or older. The average household size was 2.35 and the average family size was 2.92.

The median age was 39.3 years. 26.2% of residents were under the age of 18; 7% were between the ages of 18 and 24; 24% were from 25 to 44; 24.9% were from 45 to 64; and 17.8% were 65 or older. The gender makeup of the city was 48.5% male and 51.5% female.

=== 2000 census ===
As of the 2000 census, there were 4,163 people in 1,722 households, including 1,127 families, in the city. The population density was 2,007.2 inhabitants per square mile (775.0/km^{2}). There were 1,851 housing units at an average density of 892.5 per square mile (344.6/km^{2}). The racial makeup of the city was 93.39% White, 0.17% African American, 0.43% Native American, 0.43% Asian, 3.82% from other races, and 1.75% from two or more races. Hispanic or Latino of any race were 10.95% of the population.

Of the 1,722 households 32.0% had children under the age of 18 living with them, 52.6% were married couples living together, 8.9% had a female householder with no husband present, and 34.5% were non-families. 30.4% of households were one person and 14.7% were one person aged 65 or older. The average household size was 2.37 and the average family size was 2.95.

The age distribution was 26.4% under the age of 18, 7.8% from 18 to 24, 27.0% from 25 to 44, 22.2% from 45 to 64, and 16.6% 65 or older. The median age was 37 years. For every 100 females, there were 92.8 males. For every 100 females age 18 and over, there were 90.8 males.

The median household income was $32,392, and the median family income was $43,413. Males had a median income of $27,217 versus $20,089 for females. The per capita income for the city was $18,139. About 9.8% of families and 12.1% of the population were below the poverty line, including 17.1% of those under age 18 and 11.3% of those age 65 or over.

== Government ==
Cozad uses an elected mayor and a city council consisting of four council members, with the city clerk handling day-to-day operations. The city also has a seven-member police department with centralized dispatch out of the county sheriff's office in Lexington.

== Education ==
It is in the Cozad Public Schools school district.

== Notable people ==
- Heather Armbrust, IFBB professional bodybuilder, was born in Cozad
- Dan Christensen, American abstract painter, was born in Cozad
- Jared Crick, NFL defensive end
- Kirstin Cronn-Mills, young adult author
- Chris Dishman, NFL lineman
- Robert Henri, American painter of the Ashcan School, was the son of John J. Cozad. His boyhood home, the Hendee Hotel, now the Robert Henri Museum, is open to the public in the summer months.
