= Mary Fleddérus =

Dutch social scientist (1886–1977)

- Born: June 4, 1886
- Died: 1977 (aged 90–91)
- Occupations: Social activist, social scientist
- Known for: Co-president of the International Industrial Relations Institute
- Notable work: Technology and Livelihood

Mary Lambertine Fleddérus (June 4, 1886 – November 1977) was a Dutch social reformer and researcher who co-led the International Industrial Relations Institute with Mary van Kleeck. She was a pioneer of industrial relations in Europe.

In 1925 Fleddérus was responsible for organising a conference for the International Association for the Study and Improvement of Human Relations in Industry. In the introduction to the report of the Congress she called for an implementation of scientific management which incorporated paying attention to the humanitarian aspects of improving industrial efficiency.

In 1944 she co-wrote Technology and Livelihood with van Kleeck.
