= Glenham, New York =

- Hamlet
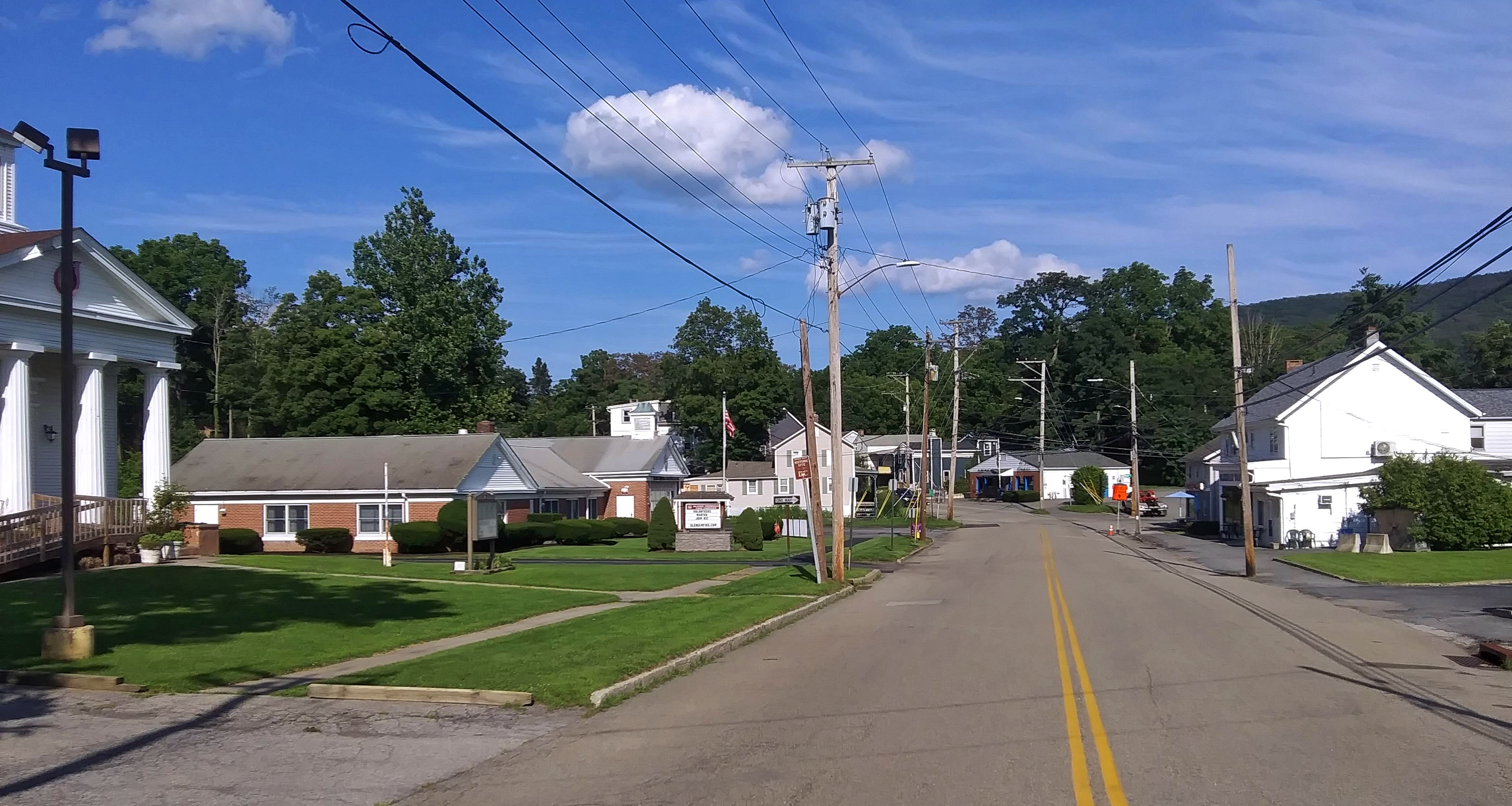

- Location within New York Location within the United States
- Coordinates: 41.5193°N 73.9334°W
- Country: United States
- State: New York
- County: Dutchess
- Elevation: 256 ft (78 m)
- Time zone: UTC-5 (Eastern (EST))
  - Summer (DST): UTC-4 (EDT)
- ZIP code: 12527
- Area code: 845
- GNIS feature ID: 951214

Glenham is a hamlet in Dutchess County, New York, United States. The community is 2.5 miles (4.0 km) east-northeast of Beacon. Glenham has a post office with ZIP code 12527, which opened on March 6, 1839. The hamlet is served by the Glenham Fire Department, which was formed in 1921.
