= Renée de Montmort =

- Born: 2 August 1881
- Died: 30 November 1960 (aged 79)

Renée Lydie Charlotte Marguerite Loppin de Montmort (2 August 1881, Paris – 30 November 1960, La Haye-Malherbe, Eure), was the founder of social works and the international curator of Guides de France.

== Background ==
Renée came from a wealthy family with a Swedish mother and an aristocratic father. The family inherited a large estate in the Cape of Good Hope, South Africa, where Renée went soon after birth, staying there until 1889.
