= Dissected Loess Plains =

Protected area in Nebraska, United States

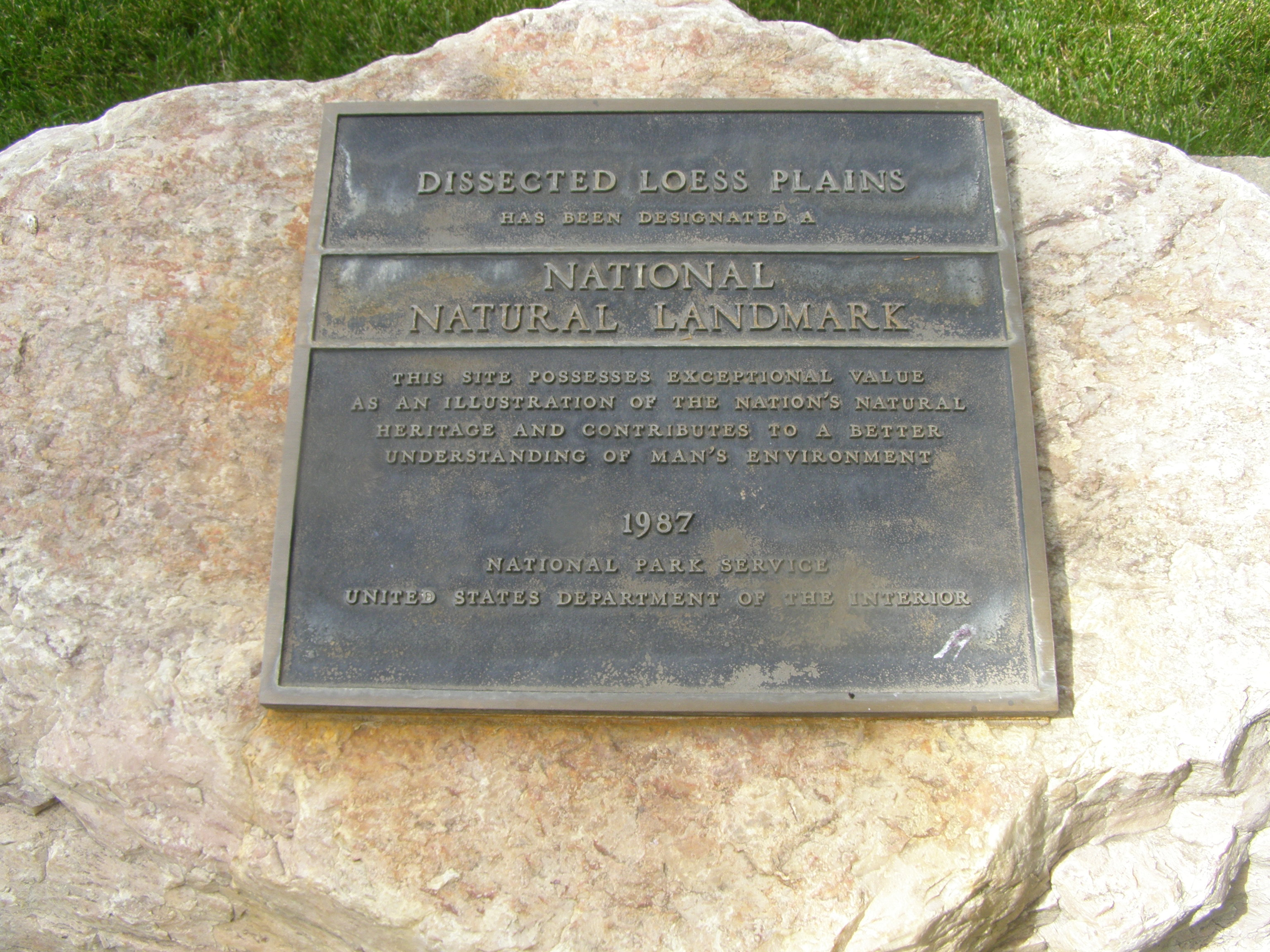
- National Natural Landmark plaque, 1987
- Location: Lincoln County, Nebraska, United States
- Nearest city: Gothenburg, Nebraska
- Area: 25,123 acres (10,167 ha)
- Established: 1987

U.S. National Natural Landmark
- Designated: 1987

The Dissected Loess Plains are located in the U.S. state of Nebraska. The 25,123 acres (10,167 ha) natural feature is located in Lincoln County and surrounding counties in the U.S. state of Nebraska, and is waymarked in the municipality of Gothenburg. A landscape of geomorphology, the plains are characterized by loess, a landscape characterized by deposition of soil that has been blown to the site by windstorms. The Dissected Loess Plains are a National Natural Landmark, designated in 1987.

== Description ==
Loess, wind-blown silt, is a relatively common soil type in the interior of North America. The Dissected Loess Plains are exceptional because of the depth of loess laid down, with deposits up to 200 feet thick. These deposits are dissected by a set of drainage ravines, canyons, and deep valleys. These features reflect the superimposition of water-based erosion upon the loess.

The Dissected Loess Plains were identified and published as a unique biome in 1948. The United States Department of Agriculture characterizes the biome as a mixed-grass steppe, which when not used for arable agriculture contains mixtures of tallgrass prairie and shortgrass prairie plants. The grass and forbs are eaten by pronghorn, as well as jackrabbits, prairie dogs, and a variety of other rodents, which coyotes prey upon.
