= Florence Simms =

American social reformer and YWCA leader 1873 - 1923

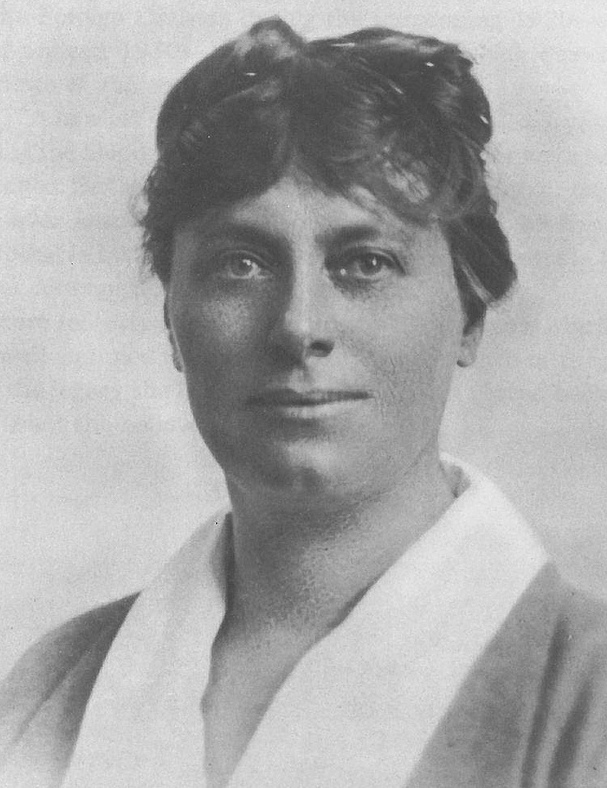
- Born: Daisy Florence Simms; April 17, 1873; Rushville, Indiana
- Died: January 6, 1923 (aged 49); Mattoon, Illinois
- Occupation: YWCA leader

Florence Simms (April 17, 1873 – January 6, 1923) was an American social reformer. She is known for her work for the Young Women's Christian Association (YWCA).

Simms was born on April 17, 1873, in Rushville, Indiana. She attended DePauw University and was a member of the Kappa Alpha Theta sorority. She graduated in 1895.

Simms began her association with the YWCA by being appointed to the American Committee of the YWCA in Chicago. She held several positions that involved travel and promotion of the YWCA, as well as establishing college branches of the organization. By 1904 Simms was serving as secretary of the Industrial Department of the YWCA. The Industrial Department focused on providing education to women in the industrial workforce, for example factories, mills, and laundries. Education included emphasizing workers rights with regard to working conditions and wages. Simms is credited with being a "driving force" in this endeavor. This experience led Simms to be an advocate of women workers as well as a her original desire to promote Christian values to women.

Simms died on January 6, 1923, in Mattoon, Illinois.

Some of Simms' papers and correspondence are in the Smith College Special Collections.
