= Gothenburg, Nebraska =

- City
- Aerial view (2026)

- Location of Gothenburg, Nebraska
- Coordinates: 40°55′27″N 100°09′14″W
- Country: United States
- State: Nebraska
- County: Dawson

Government
  - Mayor: Verlin Janssen

Area
  - Total: 3.68 sq mi (9.52 km^{2})
  - Land: 3.63 sq mi (9.41 km^{2})
  - Water: 0.046 sq mi (0.12 km^{2})
- Elevation: 2,559 ft (780 m)

Population (2020)
  - Total: 3,478
  - Density: 957.6/sq mi (369.75/km^{2})
- Time zone: UTC-6 (Central (CST))
  - Summer (DST): UTC-5 (CDT)
- ZIP code: 69138
- Area code: 308
- FIPS code: 31-19385
- GNIS feature ID: 2394936
- Website: http://www.ci.gothenburg.ne.us/

Gothenburg is a city in Dawson County, Nebraska, United States. It is part of the Lexington, Nebraska Micropolitan Statistical Area. As of the 2020 census, Gothenburg had a population of 3,478.

== History ==
Gothenburg, Nebraska is named after Gothenburg, Sweden, and is noted for its large number of residents of Swedish descent. Gothenburg, Nebraska, and Gothenburg (Swedish: Göteborg), Sweden, are believed to be the only two cities named Gothenburg in the world.

Gothenburg was founded in 1882 by Olof Bergström. After coming to America from Sweden in 1881, Bergström worked for a time on the Union Pacific Railroad, then homesteaded in Dawson County near Gothenburg. He eventually became a land agent for the UP. Bergström selected the site that was to become Gothenburg and located a farmstead about a mile north. The Union Pacific Railroad laid out the original town of eight blocks parallel to the railroad tracks. Bergström made several return trips to Sweden to lead groups of settlers to Dawson County.

== Geography ==
According to the United States Census Bureau, the city has a total area of 3.64 square miles (9.43 km^{2}), of which 3.59 square miles (9.30 km^{2}) is land and 0.05 square miles (0.13 km^{2}) is water.

=== Climate ===
Climate data for Gothenburg, Nebraska (1991–2020 normals, extremes 1894–present)
Month	Jan	Feb	Mar	Apr	May	Jun	Jul	Aug	Sep	Oct	Nov	Dec	Year
Record high °F (°C)	77 (25)	79 (26)	92 (33)	101 (38)	103 (39)	110 (43)	116 (47)	109 (43)	107 (42)	104 (40)	85 (29)	76 (24)	116 (47)
Mean maximum °F (°C)	61.6 (16.4)	65.8 (18.8)	77.6 (25.3)	85.3 (29.6)	90.3 (32.4)	96.6 (35.9)	100.0 (37.8)	97.8 (36.6)	93.3 (34.1)	84.9 (29.4)	72.7 (22.6)	62.3 (16.8)	101.4 (38.6)
Mean daily maximum °F (°C)	38.8 (3.8)	42.2 (5.7)	54.1 (12.3)	62.9 (17.2)	72.4 (22.4)	82.9 (28.3)	87.6 (30.9)	85.2 (29.6)	78.2 (25.7)	64.8 (18.2)	51.2 (10.7)	40.3 (4.6)	63.4 (17.4)
Daily mean °F (°C)	27.5 (−2.5)	30.3 (−0.9)	40.7 (4.8)	49.7 (9.8)	60.3 (15.7)	70.7 (21.5)	75.5 (24.2)	73.4 (23.0)	65.0 (18.3)	51.7 (10.9)	38.7 (3.7)	28.8 (−1.8)	51.0 (10.6)
Mean daily minimum °F (°C)	16.1 (−8.8)	18.5 (−7.5)	27.4 (−2.6)	36.6 (2.6)	48.2 (9.0)	58.5 (14.7)	63.4 (17.4)	61.5 (16.4)	51.9 (11.1)	38.6 (3.7)	26.3 (−3.2)	17.3 (−8.2)	38.7 (3.7)
Mean minimum °F (°C)	−6.7 (−21.5)	−3.5 (−19.7)	6.6 (−14.1)	19.2 (−7.1)	31.7 (−0.2)	45.0 (7.2)	52.2 (11.2)	49.6 (9.8)	35.6 (2.0)	20.1 (−6.6)	6.8 (−14.0)	−4.2 (−20.1)	−12.3 (−24.6)
Record low °F (°C)	−29 (−34)	−33 (−36)	−21 (−29)	−3 (−19)	18 (−8)	33 (1)	40 (4)	36 (2)	20 (−7)	2 (−17)	−14 (−26)	−40 (−40)	−40 (−40)
Average precipitation inches (mm)	0.38 (9.7)	0.64 (16)	1.10 (28)	2.70 (69)	4.11 (104)	3.68 (93)	3.37 (86)	3.29 (84)	1.72 (44)	1.86 (47)	0.72 (18)	0.56 (14)	24.13 (613)
Average snowfall inches (cm)	4.6 (12)	5.2 (13)	5.1 (13)	1.6 (4.1)	0.2 (0.51)	0.0 (0.0)	0.0 (0.0)	0.0 (0.0)	0.0 (0.0)	0.6 (1.5)	2.4 (6.1)	4.5 (11)	24.2 (61.21)
Average precipitation days (≥ 0.01 in)	4.4	4.8	6.5	8.5	10.9	9.3	8.7	8.3	5.8	6.4	4.4	3.4	81.4
Average snowy days (≥ 0.1 in)	2.6	2.8	2.3	0.6	0.1	0.0	0.0	0.0	0.0	0.2	1.1	2.4	12.1
Source: NOAA (snow, snow days 1894–2013)

== Demographics ==
Historical population
Census	Pop.	Note	%±
1890	535		—
1900	819		53.1%
1910	1,730		111.2%
1920	1,754		1.4%
1930	2,322		32.4%
1940	2,330		0.3%
1950	2,977		27.8%
1960	3,050		2.5%
1970	3,158		3.5%
1980	3,479		10.2%
1990	3,232		−7.1%
2000	3,619		12.0%
2010	3,574		−1.2%
2020	3,478		−2.7%
U.S. Decennial Census; 2012 Estimate

=== 2020 census ===
As of the 2020 census, Gothenburg had a population of 3,478. The median age was 41.8 years. 24.7% of residents were under the age of 18 and 21.6% were 65 years of age or older. For every 100 females, there were 95.4 males, and for every 100 females age 18 and over, there were 92.9 males age 18 and over.

There were 1,485 households in Gothenburg, of which 28.0% had children under the age of 18 living in them. Of all households, 49.8% were married-couple households, 18.8% were households with a male householder and no spouse or partner present, and 26.1% were households with a female householder and no spouse or partner present. About 33.6% of all households were made up of individuals, and 19.1% had someone living alone who was 65 years of age or older.

There were 1,655 housing units, of which 10.3% were vacant. The homeowner vacancy rate was 1.8%, and the rental vacancy rate was 12.6%.

0.0% of residents lived in urban areas, while 100.0% lived in rural areas.

Racial composition as of the 2020 census
Race	Number	Percent
White	3,220	92.6%
Black or African American	12	0.3%
American Indian and Alaska Native	16	0.5%
Asian	13	0.4%
Native Hawaiian and Other Pacific Islander	1	0.0%
Some other race	60	1.7%
Two or more races	156	4.5%
Hispanic or Latino (of any race)	192	5.5%

=== 2010 census ===
At the 2010 census there were 3,574 people in 1,494 households, including 974 families, in the city. The population density was 995.5 inhabitants per square mile (384.4/km^{2}). There were 1,664 housing units at an average density of 463.5 units per square mile (179.0 units/km^{2}). The racial makeup of the city was 97.3% White, 0.2% African American, 0.3% Native American, 0.3% Asian, 0.8% from other races, and 1.2% from two or more races. Hispanic or Latino of any race were 4.8%.

Of the 1,494 households 33.5% had children under the age of 18 living with them, 51.7% were married couples living together, 9.8% had a female householder with no husband present, 3.7% had a male householder with no wife present, and 34.8% were non-families. 31.4% of households were one person and 16.1% were one person aged 65 or older. The average household size was 2.34 and the average family size was 2.94.

The median age was 40.4 years. 27.1% of residents were under the age of 18; 5.7% were between the ages of 18 and 24; 22.5% were from 25 to 44; 25.2% were from 45 to 64; and 19.4% were 65 or older. The gender makeup of the city was 47.3% male and 52.7% female.

=== 2000 census ===
At the 2000 census, there were 3,619 people in 1,457 households, including 989 families, in the city. The population density was 1,422.6 inhabitants per square mile (549.3/km^{2}). There were 1,575 housing units at an average density of 619.1 units per square mile (239.0 units/km^{2}). The racial makeup of the city was 97.37% White, 0.44% African American, 0.33% Native American, 0.17% Asian, 1.22% from other races, and 0.47% from two or more races. Hispanic or Latino of any race were 3.62% of the population. 45.4% were of German, 11.0% Swedish, 10.9% Irish and 8.9% American ancestry according to Census 2000.

Of the 1,457 households 32.3% had children under the age of 18 living with them, 55.0% were married couples living together, 9.7% had a female householder with no husband present, and 32.1% were non-families. 29.2% of households were one person and 15.9% were one person aged 65 or older. The average household size was 2.41 and the average family size was 2.96.

The age distribution was 27.1% under the age of 18, 7.5% from 18 to 24, 24.8% from 25 to 44, 20.8% from 45 to 64, and 19.8% 65 or older. The median age was 38 years. For every 100 females, there were 87.3 males. For every 100 females age 18 and over, there were 84.7 males.

The median household income was $35,990, and the median family income was $40,729. Males had a median income of $31,589 versus $20,162 for females. The per capita income for the city was $17,034. About 6.1% of families and 7.1% of the population were below the poverty line, including 7.0% of those under age 18 and 9.1% of those age 65 or over.

== Education ==
It is in the Gothenburg Public Schools school district.

== Points of interest ==
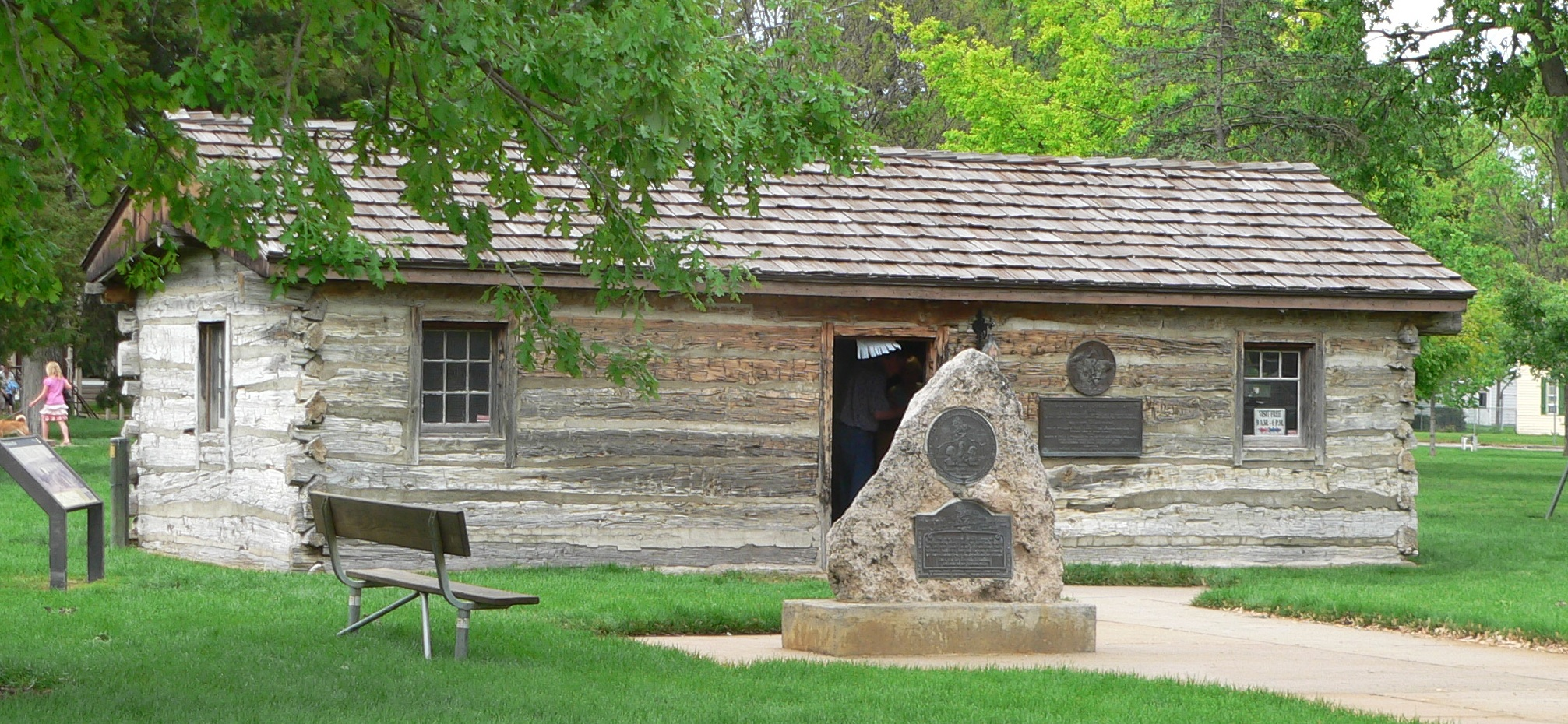
Pony Express station in Ehmen Park, Gothenburg.

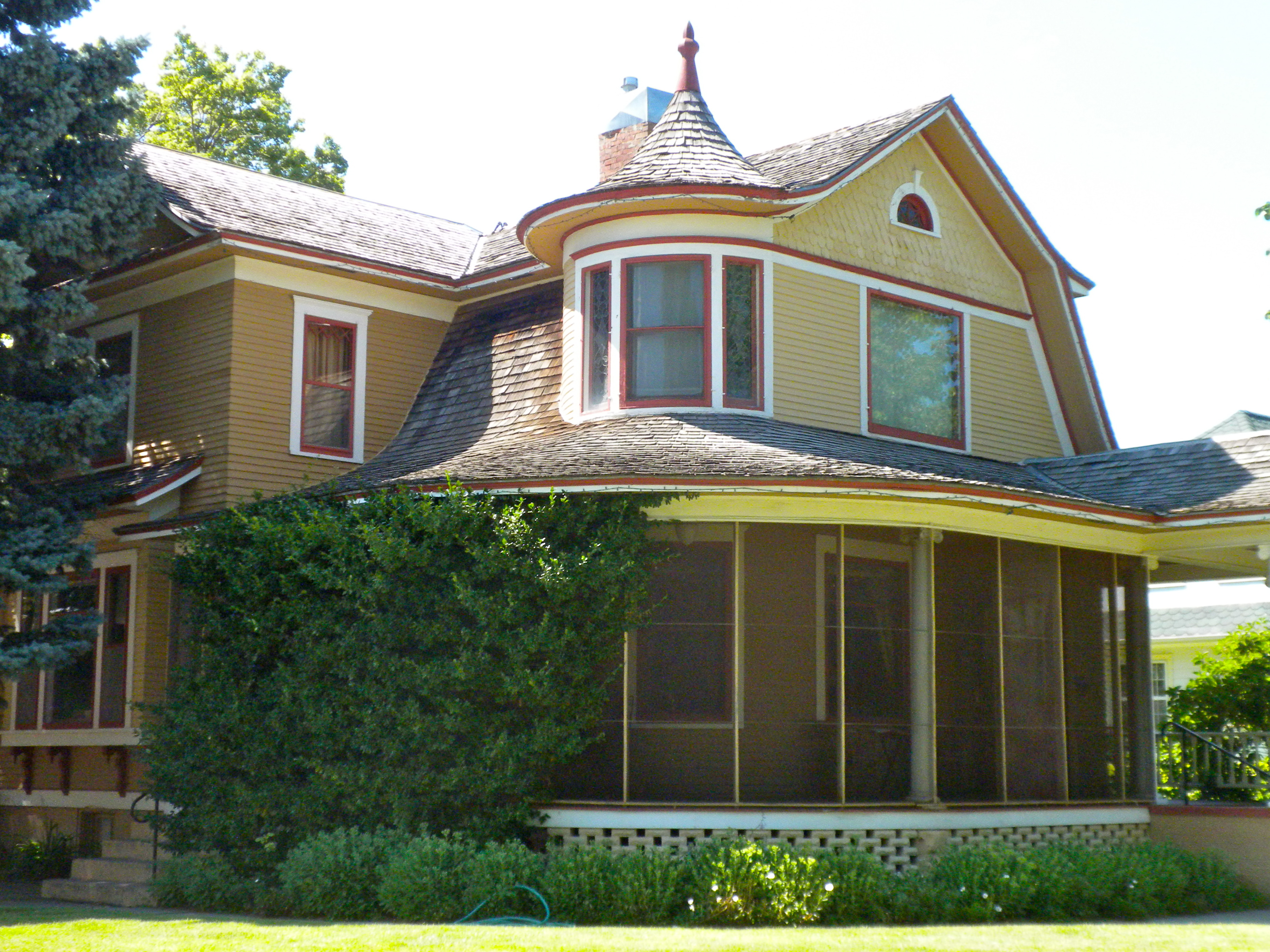
Ernest A. Calling House at 1514 Lake Avenue is listed on the National Register of Historic Places

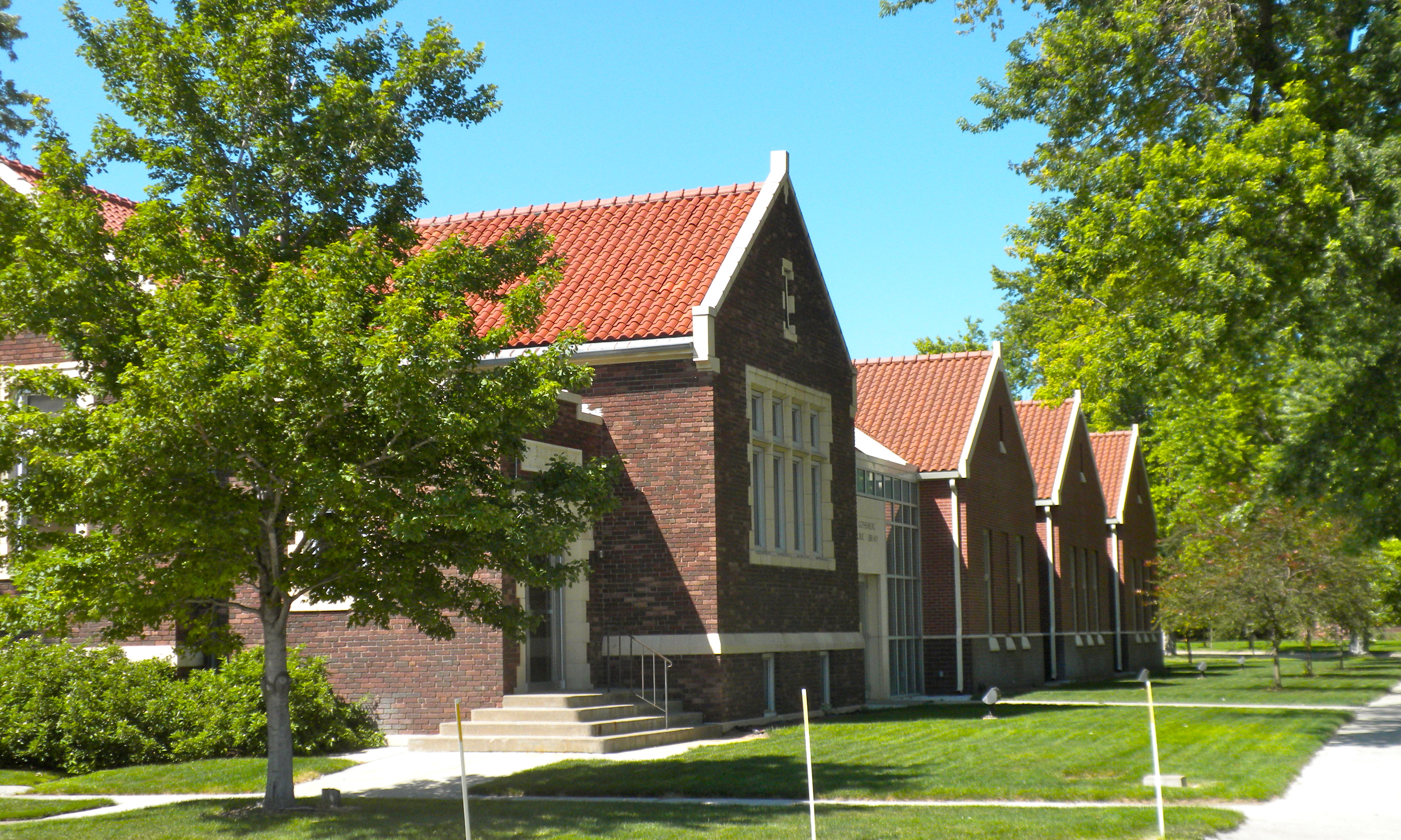
Carnegie Public Library at 1104 Lake Avenue is also listed on the National Register of Historic Places

- The Pony Express Trail runs through Gothenburg. There are two original Pony Express Stations in Gothenburg. In 1931, a station located on the Upper 96 Ranch, four miles east of Fort McPherson in Lincoln County, was donated to the city. The station was moved to Ehmen Park in central Gothenburg. A second station, Midway Stage Station, is still in its original location, on the Lower 96 Ranch four miles south of Gothenburg; it is open to the public on a limited basis.
- The Dissected Loess Plains, an unusual geological and ecological feature that has been granted status as a National Natural Landmark, is waymarked in Gothenburg.
- Swedish Crosses Cemetery, a cemetery where wrought iron crosses mark the graves of three children of Swedish immigrants, is located two miles north and two miles west of Gothenburg. A Nebraska Historical Marker was dedicated in August 1991.
- The Gothenburg Historical Museum, organized in 1980, contains many historical artifacts from the Dawson County area.
- The Sod House Museum was established in Gothenburg in 1988. The museum stands next to a full-scale replica of an authentic sod house, together with a barn, windmills and life-sized barbed wire sculptures.

== Notable people ==
- Chris Dishman, professional American football player, was born in Gothenburg
- Ben Kuroki, the only Japanese-American to serve in the US Army Air Force in the Pacific during World War II, was born in Gothenburg
- Jay Novacek, professional football player, attended Gothenburg High School
- Louise Odencrantz, social scientist
