= Miles Maryott =

American baseball player, painter, and convicted murderer

Miles Julian Maryott
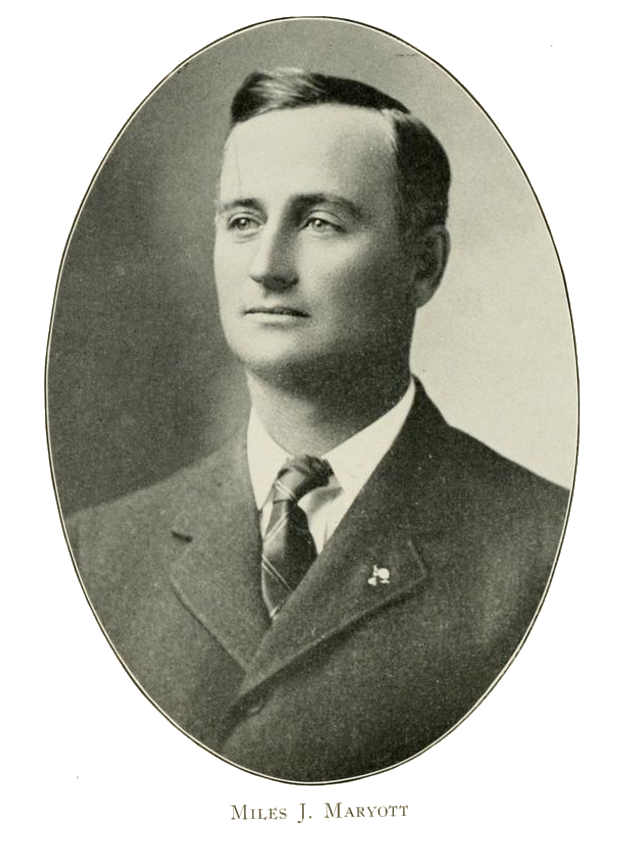
- Portrait of Miles Maryott, 1921
- Born: 1871; Tekamah, Nebraska, U.S.
- Died: September 20, 1939 (aged 67–68); Lincoln, Nebraska, U.S.
- Occupations: Baseball player, painter

Miles Julian Maryott (1873 - September 20, 1939) was an American baseball player, painter, and convicted murderer. His paintings can be seen at the Museum of Nebraska Art in Kearney, Nebraska.

On November 24, 1926, Maryott shot and killed Oshkosh town marshal George Albee as the latter attempted to arrest him. He was convicted of second degree murder and sentenced to life in prison.
