= John Jackson Cozad =

American murderer and real estate developer (1830-1906)

- Born: 9 November 1830; Richland, Ohio, United States
- Died: 15 December 1906 (aged 76); New York City, New York, United States
- Other name: Richard Henry Lee
- Known for: Founder of Cozad, Nebraska and Cozaddale, Ohio
- Spouse: Theresa Gatewood
- Children: 6 including Robert Henri

John Jackson Cozad was an American murderer, gambler and real estate developer, best known for being the founder of Cozad, Nebraska and Cozaddale.

== Early life ==
Cozad was born on his fathers farm near Allensville, Ohio in 1830. He ran away from home at the age of 12. He lived on riverboats running up and down the Mississippi and Ohio rivers. His first job was dealing Faro. For a short period he lived in South America and also participated in California gold rush. He married Virginia native Theresa Gatewood in 1858. Together they had two children, John and Robert Henri. Cozad was promoting business in his state of Ohio around this time and it led to him finding his first settlement Cozaddale.

== Alfred Pearson murder ==
In 1873 he moved his family to Nebraska where he founded the city of Cozad. Their time in Nebraska was short-lived. In 1882 Cozad got into an altercation with a rancher named Alfred Pearson. They both claimed ownership over the same plot of land. Over time their disagreement became increasingly strong. In October of that year Cozad shot Pearson in the face. He died from this injury two months later. Fearing he would be hanged he fled with his family to Denver.

== Later life ==
After leaving Nebraska, Cozad changed his name to Robert Henry Lee and lived in Atlantic City and New York City. Only returned to Nebraska once in the 1890s but never revealed his true identity. He died in 1906 from pneumonia while living in New York City.
