= George E. Terwilleger =

American politician (1941–2012)

George Terwilleger

Member of the Ohio House of Representatives from the 2nd district
- In office January 5, 1993-December 31, 2000
- Preceded by: Corwin Nixon
- Succeeded by: Tom Raga

Personal details
- Born: February 3, 1941 Cozaddale, Ohio
- Died: February 26, 2012 (aged 71) Cincinnati, Ohio
- Party: Republican

George E. Terwilleger (February 3, 1941 – February 26, 2012) was a member of the Ohio House of Representatives from 1993 to 2000. His district consisted of a portion of Warren County, Ohio. He was succeeded by Tom Raga. A bridge in Foster, Ohio, where the Old 3-C Highway crosses the Little Miami River, is named in his honor.

== Early life and education ==
George E. Terwilleger was born in Cozaddale, Ohio, on February 3, 1941. He received his education from the following institution:

- AA, Business Administration, Xavier University

== Political experience ==
George Terwilleger has had the following political experience:

- Hamilton Twp. trustee Twp. clerk Warren Co. commissioner

== Organizations ==
George Terwilleger has been a member of the following organizations:

- Area Progress Council
- Clinton/Warren Cos. Solid Waste Policy Comm., Chair
- County Commissioners Association of Ohio Board
- Co. Association of Trustees, President
- Co. Reg. Planning Commission
- Ohio Public Works, Vice-chair
- National Association of Counties
- National Association of Towns and Townships
- Scottish Rite Club, president
- Warren Co. Board of Realtors, director and president
- Worthy Patron of the Morrow Chapter Order of Eastern Stars

== Death ==
Terwilleger died at Hospice of Cincinnati on February 26, 2012 at the age of 71.
