= The Masquerade Dress =

1911 painting by Robert Henri

- Artist: Robert Henri
- Year: 1911
- Medium: Oil on canvas
- Subject: Marjorie Organ
- Dimensions: 194.3 cm × 92.1 cm (76.5 in × 36.3 in)
- Location: Metropolitan Museum of Art; New York

The Masquerade Dress is an early 20th-century painting by American artist Robert Henri. Done in oil on canvas, the portrait depicts Henri's wife Marjorie, who herself produced art under her maiden name, Marjorie Organ. The work is in the collection of the Metropolitan Museum of Art, in New York.
