= Cozaddale, Ohio =

Unincorporated community in Ohio, U.S.

Coordinates: 39°16′17″N 84°09′43″W

Cozaddale is an unincorporated community in southeastern Hamilton Township, Warren County, Ohio, United States. It is two miles west of Pleasant Plain, and three miles north of Goshen, Ohio.

== History ==
Cozaddale was platted by John Jackson Cozad in 1871, and named for him. A post office was established at Cozaddale in 1871, and remained in operation until 1968. Cozad also founded the city of Cozad, Nebraska.

== Notable people ==
- Clem Bevans was born in 1879 in Cozaddale. He had a long and prolific film and stage career and often played older men in supporting roles.
- Ches Crist was born in 1882 in Cozaddale. He was the only Cozaddale-born native to date to play professional baseball. He played for the 1906 Philadelphia Phillies, appearing in six games as a catcher.
- George Terwilleger was born in Cozaddale in 1941, and served as Warren County Commissioner and as Ohio state representative. A bridge in Foster, Ohio, where the Old 3-C Highway crosses the Little Miami River, is named in his honor.
- Robert Henri (né Robert Henry Cozad), son of John J. Cozad, lived in Cozaddale as a boy. He was a prolific portrait artist and teacher. Leader of the Immortal Eight and the Ashcan School.
