= Marjorie Organ =

American cartoonist

Marjorie Organ Henri
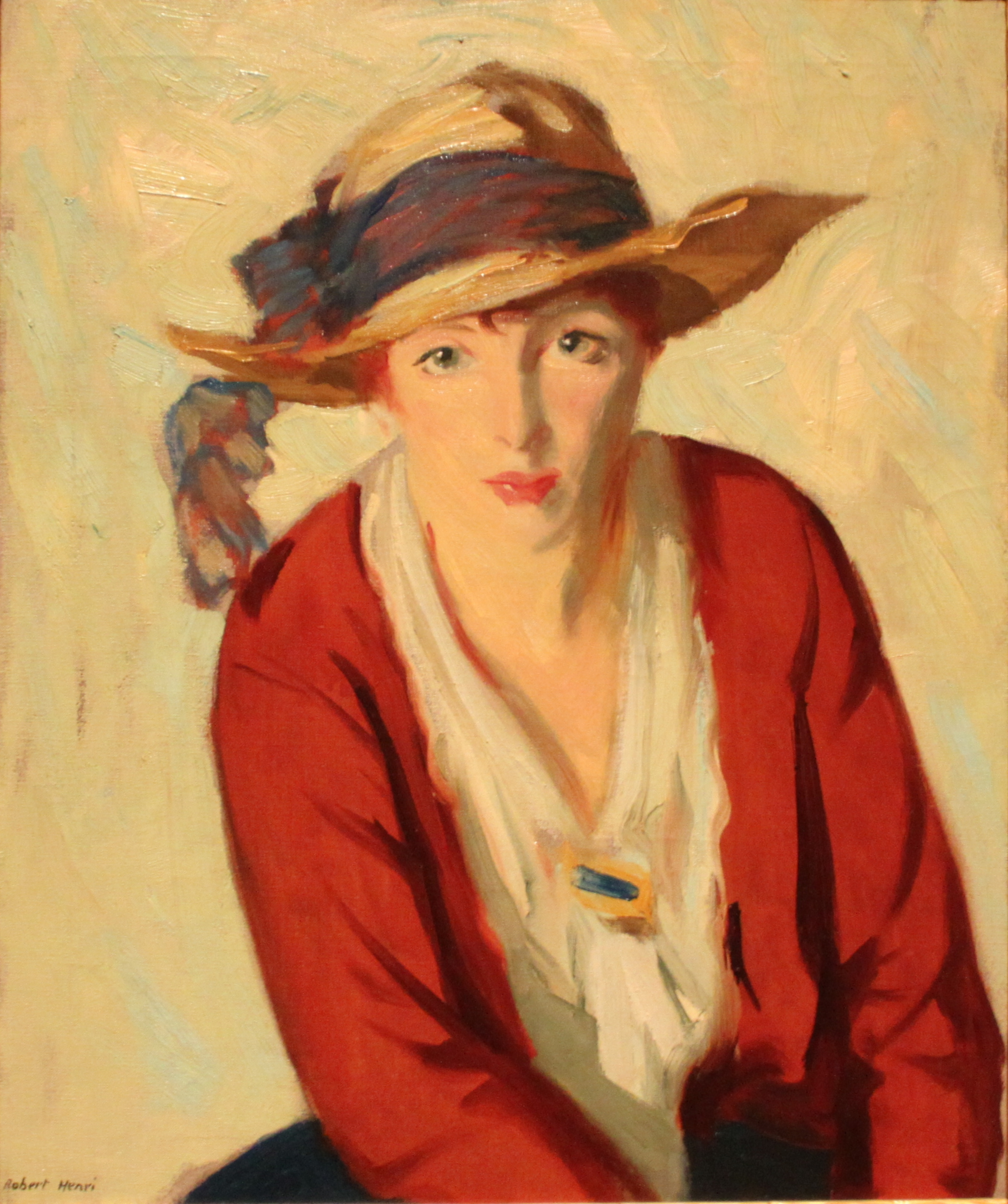
- Marjorie Organ by Robert Henri
- Born: Marjorie Organ; December 3, 1886
- Died: July 1930 (aged 43)
- Education: Hunter College, Dan McCarthy's National School of Caricature, and the New York School of Art
- Known for: illustrator, cartoonist and caricaturist
- Movement: Modernist

Marjorie Organ Henri (December 3, 1886 – July 1930) was an Irish-born American illustrator, cartoonist and caricaturist.

One of five children of an Irish wallpaper designer, Organ came to the United States with her family when she was 13. She briefly attended Hunter College before dropping out at age 14 to study with illustrator Dan McCarthy.

In the fall of 1902, at the age of 16, she gained employment as a cartoonist in William Randolph Hearst's New York Journal, the only female artist on the staff. There she authored several comic strips, the longest-running being Reggie and the Heavenly Twins. Organ also published two strips, The Man Hater Club and Strange What a Difference a Mere Man Makes, in the New York World. In early 1908 she met painter Robert Henri and soon joined a class of his at the New York School of Art. On May 5, 1908, the two were married. Although she continued to produce drawings and paintings after that, she was more frequently the model for Henri and spent much of her life orchestrating their social life.

== Portraits of Marjorie Organ Henri by Robert Henri ==
- O in Black with Scarf, (1910), Fine Arts Museums of San Francisco
- The Masquerade Dress, (1911), Metropolitan Museum of Art
- Portrait of Mrs. Henri, (1914), San Diego Museum of Art
- The Beach Hat, (1914), Detroit Institute of Art
- Marjorie Organ Henri or O, Reclining Figure, Estate of Robert Henri

Henri also painted at least two portraits of Marjorie Organ's sister, Violet Organ.

- Viv (Miss Violet Organ), oil painting, 1919, private collection
- Violet Organ, watercolor, (1921) private collection

== Armory Show of 1913 ==
Organ was one of the artists who exhibited at this landmark show. Although she was already married to Henri she showed as Marjorie Organ. The show included several of her drawings listed as Drawings Nos. 1-6 ($50 each).

Robert Henri died of cancer in 1929 and she followed him a year later, also of cancer.
