= Rufus J. Dryer =

American painter (1880–1937)

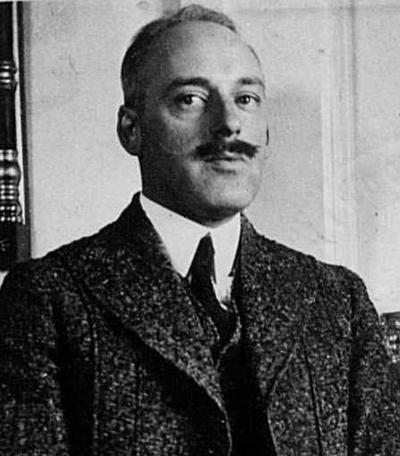
Rufus J. Dryer (1915)

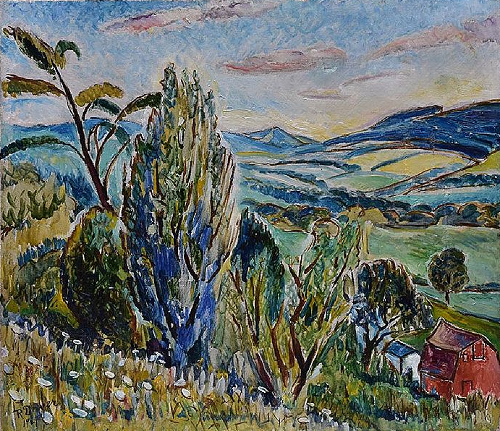
The Delphi Valley

Rufus Joseph Dryer (3 April 1880, Rochester, New York – 28 May 1937, Marcy, New York) was an American modernist painter known primarily for watercolors.

== Biography ==
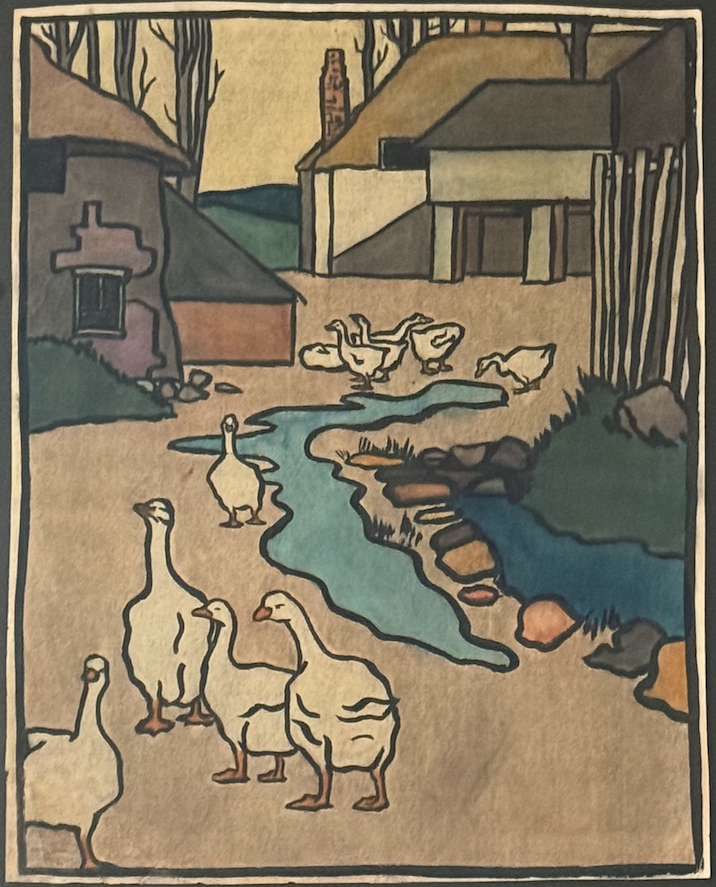
A quiet village of stacked, blocky houses in soft tones sets the backdrop as a cleanly outlined flock of geese crosses a cobbled lane. Graphic and minimal, the piece blends rural charm with modernist structure and illustrative simplicity.

His father, Rufus Keeler Dryer was board chairman of the Monroe County Savings Bank. After graduating from Phillips Academy, he began taking art lessons. When he turned twenty-one, he moved to New York City to study with Robert Henri. In 1908, he travelled to Spain with Henri and his students. By 1910, he had established a studio in Paris, near the Île de la Cité, where he stayed for over twenty years. In 1917, he served as a driver for the American Volunteer Motor Ambulance Corps, with the rank of Sergeant.

His initial style was largely cubist, but by the 1920s he had come to favor an older, Post-Impressionist style. Landscapes formed a large part of his output. He exhibited frequently at the Pennsylvania Academy, the Salon d'Automne, the Salon des Tuileries, and the Salon des Independents, among others.

In 1934, not long after the Sixth of February Crisis, he left Paris and returned to his family's estate, High Acres, in Geneva, New York. He lived a relatively reclusive life but continued to paint until his death in 1937.

Later that year, a retrospective was held at the Memorial Art Gallery in Rochester. It was organized by Kathleen McEnery, a friend and cousin, who had also been a student of Henri's. His father died, aged ninety-one, shortly before the exhibit opened.
