= Tom Raga =

American politician (born 1965)

Member of the Ohio House of Representatives from the 67th district
- In office January 5, 2001 – December 31, 2006
- Preceded by: George E. Terwilleger
- Succeeded by: Shannon Jones

Personal details
- Party: Republican

Thomas A. Raga (born 1965) is the President of AES Ohio, a subsidiary of The AES Corporation, and also the Executive Director of the AES Ohio Foundation. Raga is a former politician of the Republican Party who represented the 67th district (Warren County) in the Ohio House of Representatives. In February 2006, he was named by Ken Blackwell as his running mate in the May 2, 2006, primary for governor of Ohio. Blackwell and Raga won the Republican nomination, but lost the November general election to Ted Strickland and Lee Fisher 60-36%.

== Political career ==
A native of Cincinnati, Raga graduated from Moeller High School and from Cornell University received a B.S. in agricultural economics. Raga moved to Deerfield Township, Warren County, Ohio in October 1995. Raga's first elective office was as a trustee of Deerfield Township, elected on November 4, 1997, by defeating long-time incumbent Bob Carter. In the three-way race for two seats, the results were 2,338 (33.65%) for Raga, 2,480 (35.69%) for Larry Backus, and 2,130 (30.66%) for Carter. He served from January 1, 1998, to his resignation in December 2000. (Barbara Wilkens Reed was appointed his successor.)

On March 7, 2000, he won a three-way primary against attorney and former Mason mayor Betty Davis and Clearcreek Township trustee Ed Wade to replace Republican state representative George E. Terwilleger, who was forced to retire because of Ohio's term limits. Both Davis and Wade had lost the 1992 Republican primary to Terwilleger for the open seat. Raga wrote in the Dayton Daily News he was running because

We all know the issues affecting our daily lives, including: education dilemmas with inequitable and insufficient funding, meaningful achievement standards and learning in an environment free from fear; health-care issues affecting the affordability, accessibility and quality of care; and controlled and balanced growth issues involving expansion of infrastructure while maintaining green space and our own unique community standards and way of life.

The Dayton Daily News wrote "Mr. Raga, a Deerfield Township trustee, calls for lower taxes and putting families first on Ohio's agenda. He favors local control of schools and basic education. But he is short on details about how he, as a state representative, would accomplish those goals" and endorsed Davis. Davis had the backing of former Warren County representative Corwin M. Nixon, Terwilleger's predecessor and Republican leader in the Ohio House for years. Raga campaigned hard in northern Warren County and had the support of the Warren County Right-to-life organization. Raga spent $50,000 on the primary. The results were 11,875 votes (45.32%) for Raga, 9,432 (35.99%) for Davis, and 4,898 (18.69%) for Wade.

On November 7, 2000, he was elected State Representative for the Second District, which comprised all of Warren County. In the general election, Raga faced landscaper Richard J. Inskeep, 42, of Mason. Inskeep had previously lost races for the Mason city council and the Seventh Senate District, losing to Richard H. Finan. Inskeep told The Cincinnati Enquirer "I'm not looking at beating Tom Raga. I'm looking at putting the issues out on the table that I think are important." The Dayton Daily News endorsed Raga, saying "He is a more proven quantity", unlike Inskeep, who "has no experience in government and little in community leadership." Raga easily defeated Inskeep in the heavily Republican county 48,498 (75.39%) to 15,833 (24.61%). Raga raised over $120,000 for his 2000 campaign.

After redistricting, Warren County was split into two districts. Raga's district became the Sixty-seventh and comprised about two-thirds of Warren County including all of Franklin, Clearcreek, and Turtlecreek Townships, and the western part of Deerfield Township, plus all of the cities of Franklin and Lebanon; the Warren County portions of the cities of Carlisle, Springboro, Monroe and Middletown; and most of the city of Mason. Since his election in 2000, Raga has been re-elected without opposition in every primary and general election.

== Business career ==
After leaving political office, Raga continued his public service at Sinclair Community College as Senior Director of Regional Strategy and Development where he worked in the president's office on college-wide policy, tactics and its expansion to a Warren County Learning Center. In 2008 Raga was promoted to Vice President of Advancement, where he led the college staff focused on relationships and resources. The division includes the offices of foundation, grants, alumni affairs, public policy and entrepreneurial investments.

In 2010, Raga joined The Dayton Power and Light Company as director of government relations. Raga also worked as vice president of external relations before being named president and CEO in 2015. As president, Raga oversaw Dayton Power and Light's transition to a regulated electric transmission and distribution company. The process included state and federal regulatory decisions addressing the separation of DP&L's generation assets to a subsidiary and the filing of DP&L's third electric security plan (ESP). In 2018, Raga was named vice president of DPL Inc. whose principal subsidiaries include The Dayton Power and Light Company, Miami Valley Lighting, Inc. and AES Ohio Generation, LLC.

Raga also serves as executive director of The Dayton Power and Light Company Foundation.

== Personal ==
Raga is married to Jean M. Raga, a real estate agent and Team Lead with Xp Realty-Main Street. They have two children.

Party political offices
Preceded by Jennette Bradley	Republican nominee for Lieutenant Governor of Ohio; 2006	Succeeded by Mary Taylor
