= Ches Crist =

American baseball player (1882–1957)

- Catcher
- Born: February 10, 1882; Cozaddale, Ohio, U.S.
- Died: January 7, 1957 (aged 74); Cincinnati, Ohio, U.S.
- Batted: Right Threw: Right

MLB debut
- May 18, 1906, for the Philadelphia Phillies

Last MLB appearance
- October 1, 1906, for the Philadelphia Phillies

MLB statistics
- Batting average: .000
- Games played: 6
- At bats: 11
- Stats at Baseball Reference

Teams
- Philadelphia Phillies (1906)

Chester Arthur Crist (February 10, 1882 – January 7, 1957), nicknamed "Squak", was an American Major League Baseball catcher. He played in six games for the Philadelphia Phillies in 1906, going 11 at bats without a hit. Crist grew was born into a farming family in Cozzaddale Ohio. When he was 6 his Father Elias died and the family relocated to a different part of Ohio. He held the record for his high schools 100m dash at one point. He was named after Chester A. Arthur, who was President of the United States at the time of Crist's birth. He played several years in the Minor Leagues.
