= 134th Ohio General Assembly =

←	133rd	135th	→
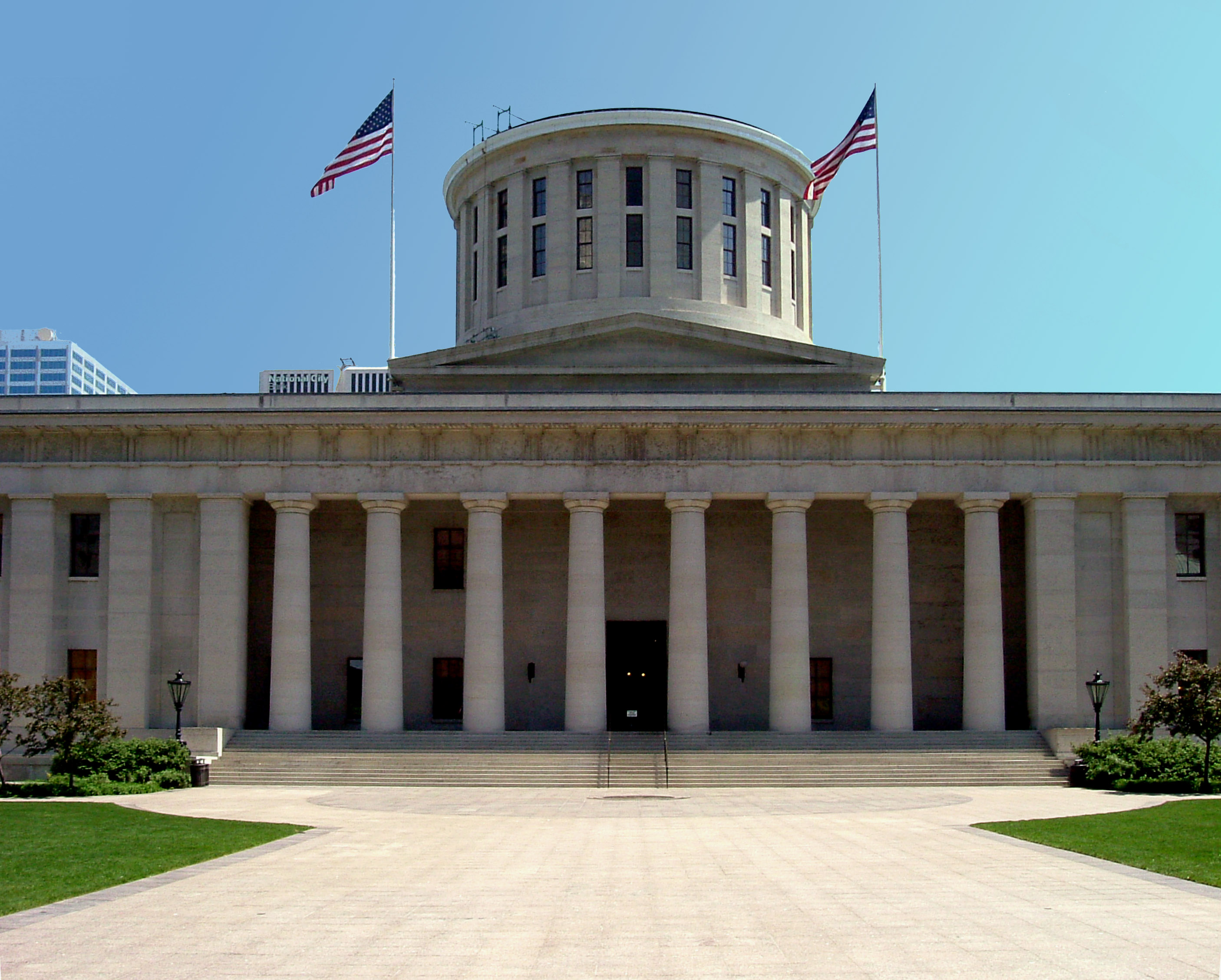
- Ohio Statehouse (2004)

Overview
- Term: January 4, 2021 – December 31, 2022

Ohio Senate
- Senate party standings
- Members: 33 (25 R, 8 D)
- President of the Senate: Matt Huffman
- President Pro Tempore: Jay Hottinger
- Party control: Republican Party

House of Representatives
- House party standings
- Members: 99 (64 R, 35 D)
- House Speaker: Robert Cupp
- Party control: Republican Party

Sessions
- 1st: January 4, 2021 – December 31, 2022

The One Hundred Thirty-Fourth Ohio General Assembly was a meeting of the Ohio state legislature, composed of the Ohio Senate and the Ohio House of Representatives. It convened in Columbus, Ohio on January 4, 2021, and adjourned on December 31, 2022. The apportionment of legislative districts was based on the 2010 United States census and 2011 redistricting plan. The Ohio Republican Party retained the majority in both the Ohio Senate and Ohio House of Representatives.

== Party summary ==
Resignations and new members are discussed in the "Changes in membership" section, below.

=== Senate ===
	Party (Shading indicates majority caucus)		Total	Vacant
	Democratic	Republican	Total	Vacant
End of previous Assembly	9	24	33	0
Begin (January 4, 2021)	8	25	33	0
Latest voting share	24.2%	75.8%		

=== House of Representatives ===
	Party (Shading indicates majority caucus)		Total	Vacant
	Democratic	Republican	Total	Vacant
End of previous Assembly	38	61	99	0
Begin (January 4, 2021)	35	64	99	0
June 16, 2021	35	63	98	1
June 28, 2021	34	64	98	1
October 13, 2021	35	64	99	0
January 2, 2022	34	64	98	1
February 16, 2022	35	64	99	0
February 27, 2022	35	63	98	1
March 9, 2022	35	64	99	0
April 22, 2022	34	64	98	1
May 18, 2022	35	64	99	0
Latest voting share	35.4%	65.3%		

== Leadership ==
=== Senate ===
- Senate President: Matt Huffman
- President Pro Tempore: Jay Hottinger

Majority (Republican) leadership

- Majority Floor Leader: Kirk Schuring
- Majority Whip: Rob McColley

Minority (Democratic) leadership

- Senate Minority Leader: Kenny Yuko
- Assistant Minority Leader: Cecil Thomas
- Minority Whip: Nickie Antonio
- Assistant Minority Whip: Tina Maharath

=== House of Representatives ===
- Speaker of the House: Robert Cupp
- Speaker Pro Tempore: Tim Ginter

Majority (Republican) leadership

- Majority Floor Leader: Bill Seitz
- Assistant Majority Floor Leader: Rick Carfagna
- Majority Whip: Don Jones
- Assistant Majority Whip: Cindy Abrams

Minority (Democratic) leadership

- House Minority Leader: Allison Russo
- Assistant Minority Leader: Thomas West
- Minority Whip: Jessica Miranda
- Assistant Minority Whip: Richard Brown

== Membership ==
=== Senate ===
District	Senator	Party	Residence	First elected	Term limited
1	Rob McColley	Republican	Napoleon	2017 (Appt.)	2026
2	Theresa Gavarone	Republican	Bowling Green	2019 (Appt.)	2028
3	Tina Maharath	Democratic	Canal Winchester	2018	2026
4	George Lang	Republican	West Chester	2020	2028
5	Steve Huffman	Republican	Tipp City	2018	2026
6	Niraj Antani	Republican	Miamisburg	2020	2028
7	Steve Wilson	Republican	Maineville	2017 (Appt.)	2026
8	Louis Blessing	Republican	Colerain Township	2019 (Appt.)	2028
9	Cecil Thomas	Democratic	Cincinnati	2014	2022
10	Bob Hackett	Republican	London	2016 (Appt.)	2024
11	Teresa Fedor	Democratic	Toledo	2018	2026
12	Matt Huffman	Republican	Lima	2016	2024
13	Nathan Manning	Republican	North Ridgeville	2018	2026
14	Terry Johnson	Republican	McDermott	2019 (Appt.)	2028
15	Hearcel Craig	Democratic	Columbus	2018	2026
16	Stephanie Kunzie	Republican	Columbus	2016	2024
17	Bob Peterson	Republican	Jasper Township	2012 (Appt.)	2022
18	Jerry Cirino	Republican	Kirtland	2020	2028
19	Andrew Brenner	Republican	Powell	2018	2026
20	Tim Schaffer	Republican	Lancaster	2019 (Appt.)	2028
21	Dale Martin	Democratic	Cleveland	2022 (Appt.)	2030
22	Mark Romanchuk	Republican	Ontario	2020	2028
23	Nickie Antonio	Democratic	Lakewood	2018	2026
24	Matt Dolan	Republican	Chagrin Falls	2016	2024
25	Kenny Yuko	Democratic	Richmond Heights	2014	2022
26	Bill Reineke	Republican	Eden Township	2020	2028
27	Kristina Roegner	Republican	Hudson	2018	2026
28	Vernon Sykes	Democratic	Akron	2016	2024
29	Kirk Schuring	Republican	Canton	2018	2026
30	Frank Hoagland	Republican	Adena	2016	2024
31	Jay Hottinger	Republican	Newark	2014	2022
32	Sandra O'Brien	Republican	Rome	2020	2028
33	Michael Rulli	Republican	Salem	2018	2026

=== House of Representatives ===
District	Representative	Party	Residence	First elected	Term limited
1	Scott Wiggam	Republican	Wooster	2016	2024
2	Marilyn John	Republican	Shelby	2020	2028
3	Haraz Ghanbari	Republican	Perrysburg	2019 (Appt.)	2028
4	Robert Cupp	Republican	Shawnee Township	2014	2022
5	Tim Ginter	Republican	Salem	2014	2022
6	Phil Robinson	Democratic	Cleveland	2018	2026
7	Tom Patton	Republican	Strongsville	2016	2024
8	Kent Smith	Democratic	Euclid	2014	2022
9	Bishara Addison	Democratic	Cleveland	2022 (Appt.)	2030
10	Terrence Upchurch	Democratic	Cleveland	2018	2026
11	Shayla Davis	Democratic	Cleveland	2022 (Appt.)	2030
12	Juanita Brent	Democratic	Cleveland	2018	2026
13	Michael Skindell	Democratic	Lakewood	2018	2026
14	Bride Rose Sweeney	Democratic	Cleveland	2018 (Appt.)	2026
15	Jeffery Crossman	Democratic	Parma	2018	2026
16	Monique Smith	Democratic	Fairview Park	2020	2028
17	Adam Miller	Democratic	Columbus	2016	2024
18	Kristin Boggs	Democratic	Columbus	2016 (Appt.)	2024
19	Mary Lightbody	Democratic	Westerville	2018	2026
20	Richard Brown	Democratic	Canal Winchester	2017 (Appt.)	2026
21	Beth Liston	Democratic	Dublin	2018	2026
22	David Leland	Democratic	Columbus	2014	2022
23	Laura Lanese	Republican	Grove City	2016	2024
24	Allison Russo	Democratic	Upper Arlington	2018	2026
25	Dontavius Jarrells	Democratic	Columbus	2020	2028
26	Latyna Humphrey	Democratic	Columbus	2021 (Appt.)	2030
27	Tom Brinkman	Republican	Cincinnati	2014	2022
28	Jessica Miranda	Democratic	Forest Park	2018	2026
29	Cindy Abrams	Republican	Harrison	2019 (Appt.)	2028
30	Bill Seitz	Republican	Green Township	2016	2024
31	Brigid Kelly	Democratic	Cincinnati	2016	2024
32	Catherine Ingram	Democratic	Cincinnati	2016	2024
33	Sedrick Denson	Democratic	Cincinnati	2018	2026
34	Emilia Sykes	Democratic	Akron	2014	2022
35	Tavia Galonski	Democratic	Akron	2017 (Appt.)	2026
36	Bob Young	Republican	Green	2020	2028
37	Casey Weinstein	Democratic	Hudson	2018	2026
38	Bill Roemer	Republican	Richfield	2018	2026
39	Willis Blackshear, Jr.	Democratic	Dayton	2020	2028
40	Phil Plummer	Republican	Dayton	2018	2026
41	Andrea White	Republican	Kettering	2020	2028
42	Tom Young	Republican	Miamisburg	2020	2028
43	Rodney Creech	Republican	West Alexandria	2020	2028
44	Paula Hicks-Hudson	Democratic	Toledo	2018	2026
45	Lisa Sobecki	Democratic	Toledo	2018	2026
46	Michael Sheehy	Democratic	Oregon	2013 (Appt.)	2022
47	Derek Merrin	Republican	Waterville	2016 (Appt.)	2024
48	Scott Oelslager	Republican	North Canton	2018	2026
49	Tom West	Democratic	Canton	2016	2024
50	Reggie Stoltzfus	Republican	Paris Township	2018	2026
51	Sara Carruthers	Republican	Hamilton	2018	2026
52	Jennifer Gross	Republican	West Chester	2020	2028
53	Thomas Hall	Republican	Madison Township	2020	2028
54	Paul Zeltwanger	Republican	Mason	2014	2022
55	Gayle Manning	Republican	North Ridgeville	2018	2026
56	Joe Miller	Democratic	Amherst	2018	2026
57	Dick Stein	Republican	Norwalk	2016	2024
58	Michele Lepore-Hagan	Democratic	Youngstown	2014	2022
59	Alessandro Cutrona	Republican	Canfield	2020 (Appt.)	2028
60	Daniel Troy	Democratic	Willowick	2020	2028
61	Jamie Callender	Republican	Concord Township	2018	2026
62	Scott Lipps	Republican	Franklin	2016	2024
63	Mike Loychik	Republican	Cortland	2020	2028
64	Michael O'Brien	Democratic	Warren	2014	2022
65	Jean Schmidt	Republican	Loveland	2020	2028
66	Adam Bird	Republican	New Richmond	2020	2028
67	Kris Jordan	Republican	Powell	2018	2026
68	Shawn Stevens	Republican	Powell	2022 (Appt.)	2030
69	Sharon Ray	Republican	Wadsworth	2020	2028
70	Darrell Kick	Republican	Loudonville	2016	2024
71	Mark Fraizer	Republican	Newark	2019 (Appt.)	2028
72	Kevin Miller	Republican	Loudonville	2021 (Appt.)	2030
73	Brian Lampton	Republican	Beavercreek	2020	2028
74	Bill Dean	Republican	Xenia	2016 (Appt.)	2024
75	Gail Pavliga	Republican	Atwater	2020	2028
76	Diane Grendell	Republican	Chesterland	2019 (Appt.)	2028
77	Jeffrey LaRe	Republican	Violet Township	2019 (Appt.)	2028
78	Brian Stewart	Republican	Ashville	2020	2028
79	Kyle Koehler	Republican	German Township	2014	2022
80	Jena Powell	Republican	Arcanum	2018	2026
81	James Hoops	Republican	Napoleon	2018	2026
82	Craig Riedel	Republican	Defiance	2016	2024
83	Jon Cross	Republican	Kenton	2018	2026
84	Susan Manchester	Republican	Waynesfield	2018	2026
85	Nino Vitale	Republican	Union Township	2014	2022
86	Tracy Richardson	Republican	Marysville	2018	2026
87	Riordan McClain	Republican	Upper Sandusky	2018 (Appt.)	2026
88	Gary Click	Republican	Fremont	2020	2028
89	Douglas Swearingen, Jr.	Republican	Huron	2019 (Appt.)	2028
90	Brian Baldridge	Republican	Cherry Fork	2018	2026
91	Shane Wilkin	Republican	Lynchburg	2018 (Appt.)	2026
92	Mark Johnson	Republican	Chillicothe	2020	2028
93	Jason Stephens	Republican	Kitts Hill	2019 (Appt.)	2028
94	Jay Edwards	Republican	Nelsonville	2016	2024
95	Don Jones	Republican	Freeport	2018	2026
96	Ron Ferguson	Republican	Wintersville	2020	2028
97	Adam Holmes	Republican	Nashport	2019 (Appt.)	2028
98	Brett Hillyer	Republican	Uhrichsville	2018	2026
99	Sarah Fowler	Republican	Geneva	2020	2028

== Changes in membership ==
=== Senate ===
District	Predecessor	Reason for change	Successor	Date successor seated
21st	Sandra Williams (D)	Williams resigned to work in the private sector	Dale Martin (D)	June 8, 2022
11th	Teresa Fedor (D)	Fedor resigned effective October 31, 2022 during her run for Ohio State Board of Education	Paula Hicks-Hudson (D)	November 16, 2022

=== House of Representatives ===
District	Predecessor	Reason for change	Successor	Date successor seated
72nd	Larry Householder (R)	Householder was expelled from the House on June 16, 2021, for his role in the Ohio nuclear bribery scandal.	Kevin Miller (R)	June 28, 2021
26th	Erica Crawley (D)	Crawley resigned after being appointed to fill a vacancy on the Franklin County Board of Commissioners.	Latyna Humphrey (D)	October 13, 2021
11th	Stephanie Howse (D)	Howse resigned after being elected to the Cleveland City Council.	Shayla Davis (D)	February 16, 2022
68th	Rick Carfagna (R)	Carfagna resigned to become Senior Vice President of Government Affairs at the Ohio Chamber of Commerce.	Shawn Stevens (R)	March 9, 2022
9th	Janine Boyd (D)	Boyd resigned to take a position in the Biden administration.	Bishara Addison (D)	May 18, 2022
44th	Paula Hicks-Hudson (D)	Hicks-Hudson resigned to accept an appointment to the Ohio Senate.	Elgin Rogers Jr. (D)	November 16, 2022

== Committees ==
Listed alphabetically by chamber, including Chairperson and Ranking Member.

=== Senate ===
Committee	Chair	Ranking Member
Agriculture and Natural Resources	Tim Schaffer	Teresa Fedor
Energy and Public Utilities	Bob Peterson	Sandra Williams
Finance	Matt Dolan	Vernon Sykes
Financial Institutions and Technology	Steve Wilson	Tina Maharath
Government Oversight and Reform	Kristina Roegner	Hearcel Craig
Health	Steve Huffman	Nickie Antonio
Insurance	Bob Hackett	Hearcel Craig
Judiciary	Nathan Manning	Cecil Thomas
Local Government and Elections	Theresa Gavarone	Tina Maharath
Primary and Secondary Education	Andrew Brenner	Teresa Fedor
Rules and Reference	Matt Huffman	Kenny Yuko
Small Business and Economic Opportunity	Michael Rulli	Vernon Sykes
Transportation	Stephanie Kunzie	Nickie Antonio
Veterans and Public Safety	Frank Hoagland	Cecil Thomas
Ways and Means	Louis Blessing	Sandra Williams
Workforce and Higher Education	Terry Johnson	Sandra Williams

=== House of Representatives ===
Committee	Chair	Ranking Member
Agriculture and Conservation	Kyle Koehler	Juanita Brent
Armed Services and Veterans Affairs	Mike Loychik	Adam Miller
Behavioral Health and Recovery Supports	Sara Carruthers	Janine Boyd
Civil Justice	Brett Hillyer	Tavia Galonski
Commerce and Labor	Dick Stein	Michele Lepore-Hagan
Criminal Justice	Jeffrey LaRe	David Leland
Economic and Workforce Development	Jay Edwards	Terrence Upchurch
Energy and Natural Resources	Jason Stephens	Casey Weinstein
Families, Aging and Human Services	Susan Manchester	Beth Liston
Finance	Scott Oelslager	
Financial Institutions	Kris Jordan	Jeffrey Crossman
Government Oversight	Shane Wilkin	Bride Rose Sweeney
Health	Scott Lipps	Allison Russo
Higher Education and Career Readiness	Laura Lanese	Catherine Ingram
Infrastructure and Rural Development	Reggie Stoltzfus	Richard Brown
Insurance	Tom Brinkman	Jessica Miranda
Primary and Secondary Education	Gayle Manning	Phil Robinson
Public Utilities	James Hoops	Kent Smith
Rules and Reference	Robert Cupp	Emilia Sykes
State and Local Government	Scott Wiggam	Brigid Kelly
Technology and Innovation	Mark Fraizer	Mary Lightbody
Transportation and Public Safety	Brian Baldridge	Michael Sheehy
Ways and Means	Derek Merrin	Lisa Sobecki

=== Joint Committees ===
Committee	Chair	Ranking Member
Correctional Institution Inspection Committee		
Joint Commission on Agency Rule Review		
Joint Legislative Ethics Committee		
Joint Medicaid Oversight Committee		
Legislative Services Commission		
State Controlling Board		

== See also ==
- List of Ohio state legislatures
