= 135th Ohio General Assembly =

←	134th	136th	→
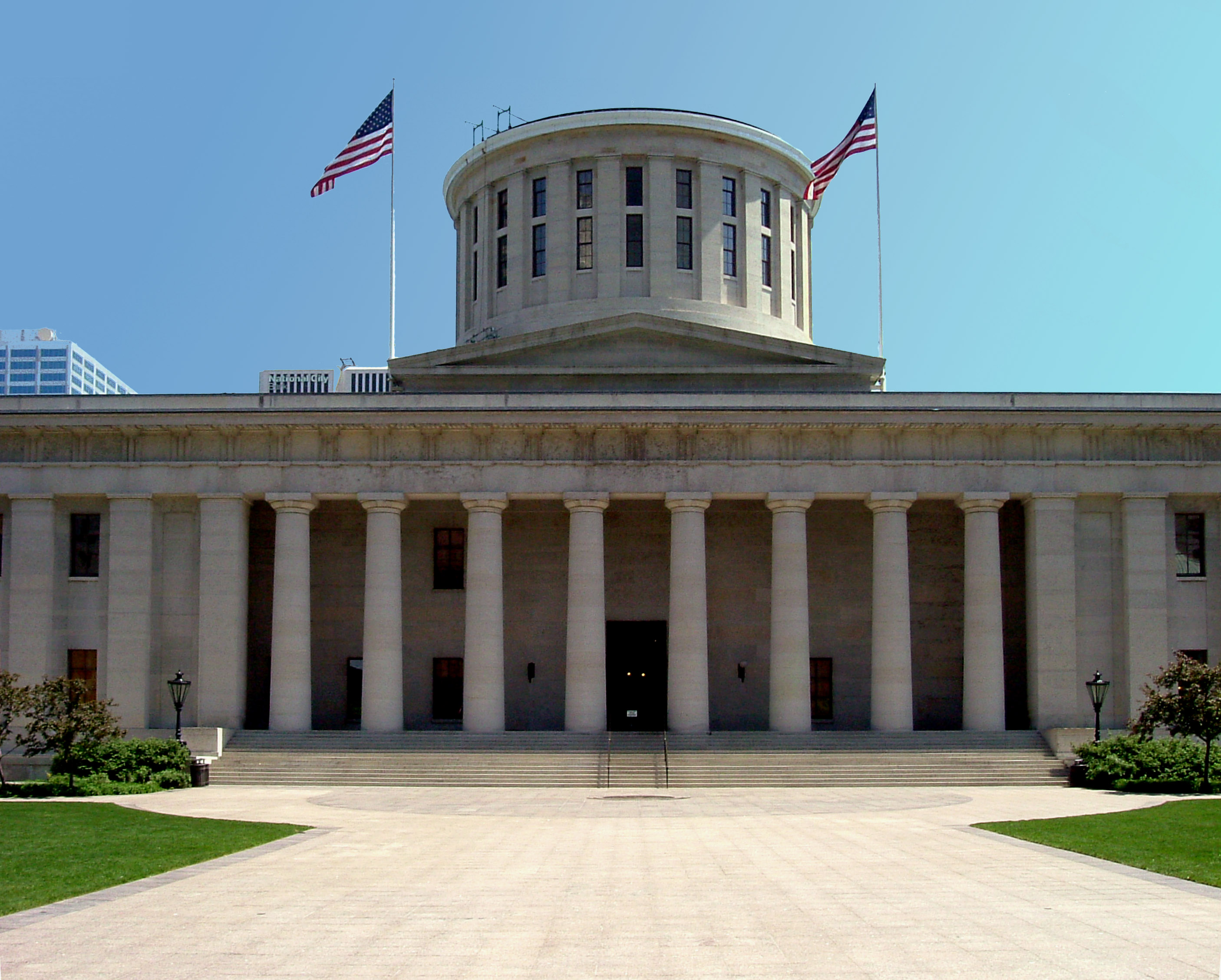
- Ohio Statehouse (2004)

Overview
- Term: January 3, 2023 – December 31, 2024

Ohio Senate
- Senate party standings
- Members: 33 (26 R, 7 D)
- President of the Senate: Matt Huffman
- President Pro Tempore: Kirk Schuring
- Party control: Republican Party

House of Representatives
- House party standings
- Members: 99 (67 R, 32 D)
- House Speaker: Jason Stephens
- Party control: Republican Party

Sessions
- 1st: January 3, 2023 – December 31, 2024

The One Hundred Thirty-Fifth Ohio General Assembly was a meeting of the Ohio state legislature, composed of the Ohio Senate and the Ohio House of Representatives. It convened in Columbus, Ohio on January 3, 2023, adjourned on December 31, 2024. The apportionment of legislative districts was based on the 2020 United States census and the 2022 redistricting plan. The Ohio Republican Party retained the majority in both the Ohio Senate and Ohio House of Representatives.

== Party summary ==
Resignations and new members are discussed in the "Changes in membership" section, below.

=== Senate ===
	Party (Shading indicates majority caucus)		Total	Vacant
	Democratic	Republican	Total	Vacant
End of previous Assembly	8	25	33	0
Begin (January 3, 2023)	7	26	33	0
December 1, 2023	7	25	32	1
December 6, 2023	7	26	33	0
June 12, 2024	7	25	32	1
June 28, 2024	7	26	33	0
November 22, 2024	7	25	32	1
Latest voting share	21.9%	78.1%		

=== House of Representatives ===
	Party (Shading indicates majority caucus)		Total	Vacant
	Democratic	Republican	Total	Vacant
End of previous Assembly	35	64	99	0
Begin (January 3, 2023)	32	67	99	0
February 2, 2023	32	66	98	1
February 25, 2023	32	65	97	2
May 10, 2023	32	67	99	0
October 2, 2023	32	66	98	1
January 9, 2024	31	66	97	2
January 10, 2024	31	66	97	2
February 7, 2024	32	66	98	1
April 13, 2024	31	66	97	2
April 24, 2024	31	67	98	1
May 8, 2024	32	67	99	0
Latest voting share	32.3%	67.7%		

== Leadership ==
House		Senate	
Presiding Officers
Speaker of the House	Jason Stephens	President of the Senate	Matt Huffman
Speaker Pro Tempore	Scott Oelslager	President Pro Tempore	Vacant
Majority Leadership
Majority Floor Leader	Bill Seitz	Majority Floor Leader	Rob McColley
Assistant Majority Floor Leader	Jon Cross	Majority Whip	Theresa Gavarone
Majority Whip	James Hoops		
Assistant Majority Whip	Sharon Ray		
Minority Leadership
Minority Leader	Allison Russo	Minority Leader	Nickie Antonio
Assistant Minority Leader	Dontavius Jarrells	Assistant Minority Leader	Hearcel Craig
Minority Whip	Dani Isaacson	Minority Whip	Kent Smith
Assistant Minority Whip	Michele Grim	Assistant Minority Whip	Paula Hicks-Hudson

== Membership ==
=== Senate ===
District	Senator	Party	Residence	First elected	Term limited
1	Rob McColley	Republican	Napoleon	2017 (Appt.)	2026
2	Theresa Gavarone	Republican	Bowling Green	2019 (Appt.)	2028
3	Michele Reynolds	Republican	Canal Winchester	2022	2030
4	George Lang	Republican	West Chester	2020	2028
5	Steve Huffman	Republican	Tipp City	2018	2026
6	Niraj Antani	Republican	Miamisburg	2020	2028
7	Steve Wilson	Republican	Maineville	2017 (Appt.)	2026
8	Louis Blessing	Republican	Colerain Township	2019 (Appt.)	2028
9	Catherine Ingram	Democratic	Hamilton	2022	2030
10	Bob Hackett	Republican	London	2016 (Appt.)	2024
11	Paula Hicks-Hudson	Democratic	Lucas	2022 (Appt.)	2030
12	Matt Huffman	Republican	Lima	2016	2024
13	Nathan Manning	Republican	North Ridgeville	2018	2026
14	Terry Johnson	Republican	McDermott	2019 (Appt.)	2028
15	Hearcel Craig	Democratic	Columbus	2018	2026
16	Stephanie Kunzie	Republican	Columbus	2016	2024
17	Shane Wilkin	Republican	Jasper Township	2022	2030
18	Jerry Cirino	Republican	Kirtland	2020	2028
19	Andrew Brenner	Republican	Powell	2018	2026
20	Tim Schaffer	Republican	Lancaster	2019 (Appt.)	2028
21	Kent Smith	Democratic	Cleveland	2022	2030
22	Mark Romanchuk	Republican	Ontario	2020	2028
23	Nickie Antonio	Democratic	Lakewood	2018	2026
24	Matt Dolan	Republican	Chagrin Falls	2016	2024
25	Bill DeMora	Democratic	Columbus	2022	2030
26	Bill Reineke	Republican	Eden Township	2020	2028
27	Kristina Roegner	Republican	Hudson	2018	2026
28	Vernon Sykes	Democratic	Akron	2016	2024
29	Vacant				
30	Brian Chavez	Republican	Marietta	2023 (Appt.)	2032
31	Al Landis	Republican	Dover	2022	2030
32	Sandra O'Brien	Republican	Rome	2020	2028
33	Alessandro Cutrona	Republican	Canfield	2024 (Appt.)	2032

=== House of Representatives ===
District	Representative	Party	Residence	First elected	Term limited
1	Dontavius Jarrells	Democratic	Columbus	2020	2028
2	Latyna Humphrey	Democratic	Columbus	2021 (Appt.)	2030
3	Ismail Mohamed	Democratic	Columbus	2022	2030
4	Beryl Piccolantonio	Democratic	Gahanna, Ohio	2024 (Appt.)	2032
5	Richard Brown	Democratic	Canal Winchester	2016	2024
6	Adam Miller	Democratic	Columbus	2016	2024
7	Allison Russo	Democratic	Upper Arlington	2018	2026
8	Beth Liston	Democratic	Dublin	2018	2026
9	Munira Abdullahi	Democratic	Columbus	2022	2030
10	David Dobos	Republican	Columbus	2022	2030
11	Anita Somani	Democratic	Dublin	2022	2030
12	Brian Stewart	Republican	Ashville	2020	2028
13	Michael Skindell	Democratic	Lakewood	2018	2026
14	Sean Brennan	Democratic	Parma	2022	2030
15	Richard Dell'Aquila	Democratic	Seven Hills	2022	2030
16	Bride Rose Sweeney	Democratic	Cleveland	2018	2026
17	Tom Patton	Republican	Strongsville	2016	2024
18	Darnell Brewer	Democratic	Cleveland, Ohio	2022	2030
19	Phil Robinson	Democratic	Solon	2018	2026
20	Terrence Upchurch	Democratic	Cleveland	2018	2026
21	Elliot Forhan	Democratic	South Euclid, Ohio	2022	2030
22	Juanita Brent	Democratic	Cleveland	2018	2026
23	Daniel Troy	Democratic	Willowick	2020	2028
24	Dani Isaacsohn	Democratic	Cincinnati	2022	2030
25	Cecil Thomas	Democratic	Cincinnati	2022	2030
26	Sedrick Denson	Democratic	Cincinnati	2018	2026
27	Rachel Baker	Democratic	Cincinnati	2022	2030
28	Jodi Whitted	Democratic	Madeira	2024 (Appt.)	2032
29	Cindy Abrams	Republican	Harrison	2019 (Appt.)	2028
30	Bill Seitz	Republican	Green Township	2016	2024
31	Bill Roemer	Republican	Richfield	2018	2026
32	Jack Daniels	Republican	New Franklin	2024 (Appt.)	2032
33	Veronica Sims	Democratic	Akron	2024 (Appt.)	2032
34	Casey Weinstein	Democratic	Hudson	2018	2026
35	Steve Demetriou	Republican	Chagrin Falls	2022	2030
36	Andrea White	Republican	Kettering	2020	2028
37	Tom Young	Republican	Miamisburg	2020	2028
38	Willis Blackshear, Jr.	Democratic	Dayton	2020	2028
39	Phil Plummer	Republican	Dayton	2018	2026
40	Rodney Creech	Republican	West Alexandria	2020	2028
41	Josh Williams	Republican	Toledo	2022	2030
42	Derek Merrin	Republican	Monclova Township	2016 (Appt.)	2024
43	Michele Grim	Democratic	Toledo	2020	2028
44	Elgin Rogers Jr.	Democratic	Toledo	2022 (Appt.)	2030
45	Jennifer Gross	Republican	West Chester	2020	2028
46	Thomas Hall	Republican	Madison Township	2020	2028
47	Sara Carruthers	Republican	Hamilton	2018	2026
48	Scott Oelslager	Republican	North Canton	2018	2026
49	Jim Thomas	Republican	Canton	2022	2030
50	Reggie Stoltzfus	Republican	Paris Township	2018	2026
51	Brett Hillyer	Republican	Uhrichsville	2018	2026
52	Gayle Manning	Republican	North Ridgeville	2018	2026
53	Joe Miller	Democratic	Amherst	2018	2026
54	Dick Stein	Republican	Norwalk	2016	2024
55	Scott Lipps	Republican	Franklin	2016	2024
56	Adam Mathews	Republican	Lebanon	2022	2030
57	Jamie Callender	Republican	Concord Township	2018	2026
58	Tex Fischer	Republican		2024 (Appt.)	2032
59	Lauren McNally	Democratic	Youngstown	2022	2030
60	Brian Lorenz	Republican	Powell	2023 (Appt.)	2032
61	Beth Lear	Republican	Galena	2022	2030
62	Jean Schmidt	Republican	Loveland	2020	2028
63	Adam Bird	Republican	New Richmond	2020	2028
64	Nick Santucci	Republican	Howland Township	2022	2030
65	Mike Loychik	Republican	Cortland	2020	2028
66	Sharon Ray	Republican	Wadsworth	2020	2028
67	Melanie Miller	Republican	Ashland	2022	2030
68	Thaddeus Claggett	Republican	Newark	2022	2030
69	Kevin Miller	Republican	Newark	2021 (Appt.)	2030
70	Brian Lampton	Republican	Beavercreek	2020	2028
71	Bill Dean	Republican	Xenia	2016 (Appt.)	2024
72	Gail Pavliga	Republican	Atwater	2020	2028
73	Jeff LaRe	Republican	Violet Township	2019 (Appt.)	2028
74	Bernard Willis	Republican	Springfield	2022	2030
75	Haraz Ghanbari	Republican	Perrysburg	2019 (Appt.)	2028
76	Marilyn John	Republican	Shelby	2020	2028
77	Scott Wiggam	Republican	Wooster	2016	2024
78	Susan Manchester	Republican	Waynesfield	2018	2026
79	Monica Robb Blasdel	Republican	German Township	2022	2030
80	Jena Powell	Republican	Arcanum	2018	2026
81	James Hoops	Republican	Napoleon	2018	2026
82	Roy Klopfenstein	Republican	Haviland	2022	2030
83	Jon Cross	Republican	Kenton	2018	2026
84	Angela King	Republican	Celina	2022	2030
85	Tim Barhorst	Republican	Fort Loramie	2022	2030
86	Tracy Richardson	Republican	Marysville	2018	2026
87	Riordan McClain	Republican	Upper Sandusky	2018 (Appt.)	2026
88	Gary Click	Republican	Fremont	2020	2028
89	Douglas Swearingen, Jr.	Republican	Huron	2019 (Appt.)	2028
90	Justin Pizzuli	Republican	Franklin Furnace	2023 (Appt.)	2032
91	Bob Peterson	Republican	Washington Court House	2022	2030
92	Mark Johnson	Republican	Chillicothe	2020	2028
93	Jason Stephens	Republican	Kitts Hill	2019 (Appt.)	2028
94	Jay Edwards	Republican	Nelsonville	2016	2024
95	Don Jones	Republican	Freeport	2018	2026
96	Ron Ferguson	Republican	Wintersville	2020	2028
97	Adam Holmes	Republican	Nashport	2019 (Appt.)	2028
98	Darrell Kick	Republican	Loudonville	2016	2024
99	Sarah Fowler Arthur	Republican	Geneva	2020	2028

== Changes in membership ==
=== Senate ===
District	Predecessor	Reason for change	Successor	Date successor seated
30th	Frank Hoagland (R)	Hoagland retired on December 1, 2023.	Brian Chavez (R)	December 6, 2023
33rd	Michael Rulli (R)	Rulli resigned after being elected to the United States House of Representatives.	Alessandro Cutrona (R)	June 26, 2024
29th	Kirk Schuring (R)	Schuring died on November 22, 2024.	Jane Timken (R)	January 29, 2025

=== House of Representatives ===
District	Predecessor	Reason for change	Successor	Date successor seated
90th	Brian Baldridge (R)	Baldridge resigned after being appointed Director of the Ohio Department of Agriculture by Governor Mike DeWine.	Justin Pizzulli (R)	May 10, 2023
60th	Kris Jordan (R)	Jordan died on February 25, 2023.	Brian Lorenz (R)	May 10, 2023
32nd	Bob Young (R)	Young resigned after being arrested on domestic violence charges.	Jack Daniels (R)	April 24, 2024
4th	Mary Lightbody (D)	Lightbody resigned on January 9, 2024 after previously announcing she was not seeking reelection.	Beryl Piccolantonio (D)	January 10, 2024
33rd	Tavia Galonski (D)	Galonski resigned on January 10, 2024 after being appointed as the Summit County Clerk of Courts.	Veronica Sims (D)	February 7, 2024
28th	Jessica Miranda (D)	Miranda resigned on April 13, 2024 after being appointed as the Hamilton County Auditor.	Jodi Whitted (D)	May 8, 2024
58th	Alessandro Cutrona (R)	Cutrona resigned after being appointed to the Ohio Senate.	Tex Fischer (R)	June 26, 2024

== Committees ==
Listed alphabetically by chamber, including Chairperson and Ranking Member.

=== Senate ===
Committee	Chair	Ranking Member
Agriculture and Natural Resources	Tim Schaffer	Paula Hicks-Hudson
Community Revitalization	Al Landis	Vernon Sykes
Education	Andrew Brenner	Catherine Ingram
Energy and Public Utilities	Bill Reineke	Kent Smith
Finance	Matt Dolan	Vernon Sykes
Financial Institutions and Technology	Steve Wilson	Kent Smith
General Government	Shane Wilkin	Bill DeMora
Government Oversight	Kristina Roegner	Paula Hicks-Hudson
Health	Steve Huffman	Nickie Antonio
Insurance	Bob Hackett	Hearcel Craig
Judiciary	Nathan Manning	Paula Hicks-Hudson
Local Government	Sandra O'Brien	Bill DeMora
Medicaid	Mark Romanchuk	Catherine Ingram
Rules and Reference	Matt Huffman	Nickie Antonio
Small Business and Economic Opportunity	George Lang	Vernon Sykes
Transportation	Stephanie Kunze	Nickie Antonio
Veterans and Public Safety	Terry Johnson	Hearcel Craig
Ways and Means	Louis Blessing	Kent Smith
Workforce and Higher Education	Jerry Cirino	Catherine Ingram

=== House of Representatives ===
Committee	Chair	Ranking Member
Agriculture	Roy Klopfenstein	Juanita Brent
Armed Services and Veterans Affairs	Mike Loychik	Adam Miller
Aviation and Aerospace	Adam Holmes	Rachel Baker
Behavioral Health	Gail Pavliga	Darnell Brewer
Civil Justice	Brett Hillyer	Dani Isaacsohn
Commerce and Labor	Mark Johnson	Lauren McNally
Constitutional Resolutions	Brett Hillyer	Ismail Mohamed
Criminal Justice	Cindy Abrams	Richard Brown
Economic and Workforce Development	Douglas Swearingen, Jr.	Terrence Upchurch
Energy and Natural Resources	Beth Lear	Elgin Rogers, Jr.
Families and Aging	Jean Schmidt	Sedrick Denson
Finance	Jay Edwards	Bride Rose Sweeney
Financial Institutions	Jeff LaRe	Richard Dell'Aquila
Government Oversight	Bob Peterson	Latyna Humphrey
Health Provider Services	Scott Oelslager	Anita Somani
Higher Education	Tom Young	Joe Miller
Homeland Security	Haraz Ghanbari	Cecil Thomas
Infrastructure	Reggie Stoltzfus	Willis Blackshear, Jr.
Insurance	Brian Lampton	
Pensions	Adam Mathews	Beryl Piccoantonio
Primary and Secondary Education	Sarah Fowler Arthur	Phil Robinson
Public Health Policy	Brian Stewart	Beth Liston
Public Utilities	Dick Stein	Casey Weinstein
Rules and Reference	Jason Stephens	Allison Russo
State and Local Government	Scott Wiggam	Sean Brennan
Technology and Innovation	Thomas Hall	Munira Abdullahi
Transportation	Riordan McClain	Michele Grim
Ways and Means	Bill Roemer	Daniel Troy

=== Joint Committees ===
Committee	Chair	Ranking Member
Correctional Institution Inspection Committee	Jean Schmidt	Latyna Humphrey
Joint Committee on Agency Rule Review	Jamie Callender	
Joint Legislative Ethics Committee	Jason Stephens	
Joint Medicaid Oversight Committee	Mark Romanchuk	Beth Liston
Legislative Services Commission		
State Controlling Board		

== See also ==
- List of Ohio state legislatures
