= 2018 Ohio Senate election =

- November 6, 2018

17 seats from odd-numbered districts in the Ohio Senate 17 seats needed for a majority
- Turnout: 55.8% (▲15.1pp) (Note: Compared to 2014, the last time these seats were up.)
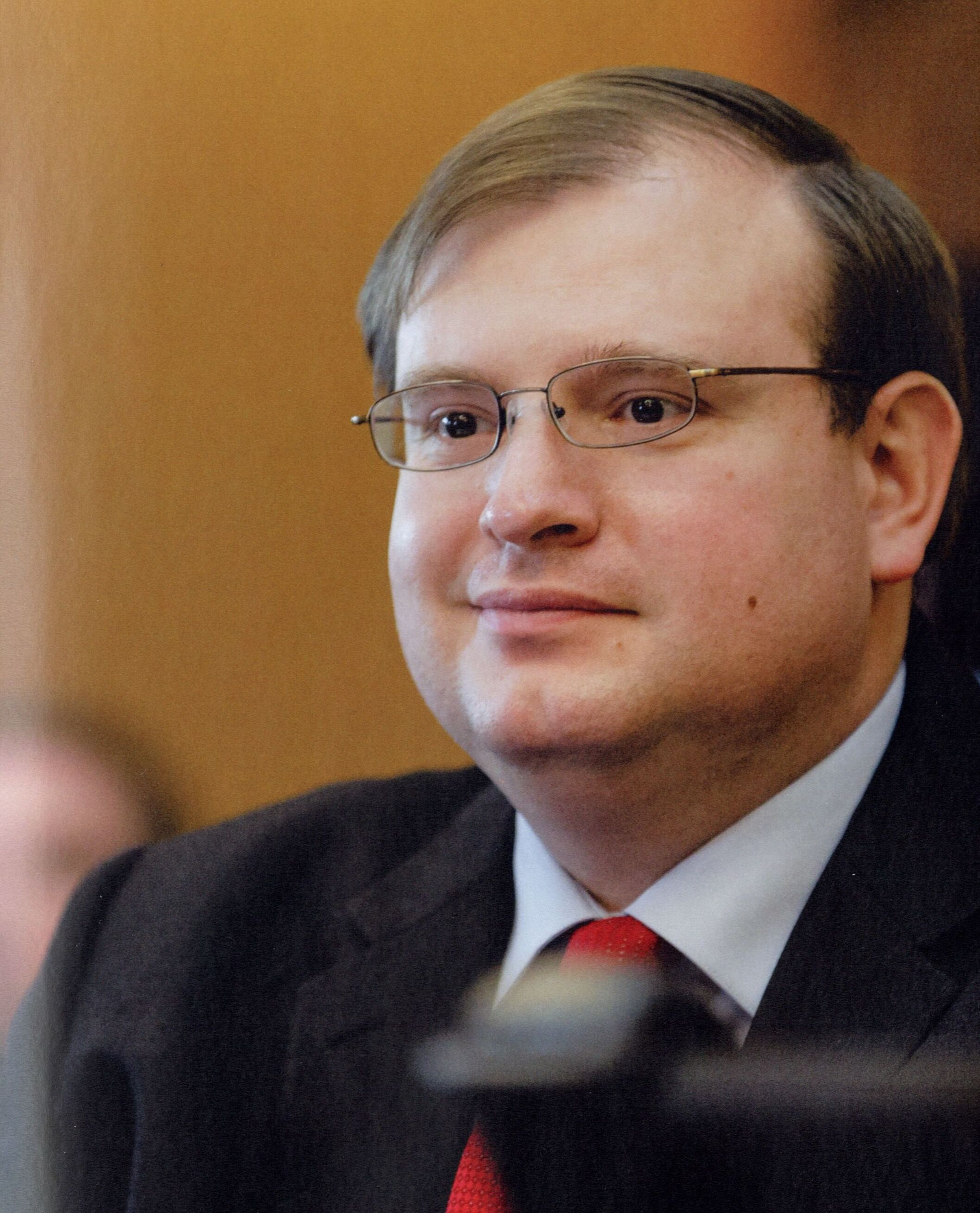

	Majority party	Minority party
Leader	Larry Obhof	Kenny Yuko
Party	Republican	Democratic
Leader's seat	District 22	District 25
Seats before	24	9
Seats after	24	9
Seat change	Steady	Steady
Popular vote	1,032,867	1,145,439
Percentage	47.26%	52.41%
Swing	▼7.17%	▲6.84%
- Results; Republican hold Republican gain Democratic hold Democratic gain Not up for election
President of the Ohio Senate before election
Larry Obhof
Republican
Elected President of the Ohio Senate
Larry Obhof
Republican

The 2018 Ohio Senate election was held on November 6, 2018, with the primary election held on May 8, 2018. Ohio voters elected state senators in the 17 odd-numbered Ohio Senate districts. State senators elected in 2018 were eligible to serve a four-year term beginning January 2019 and ending December 2022. These elections coincided with elections for Ohio governor, the Ohio House, the U.S. House of Representatives, the U.S. Senate, and other statewide offices.

Despite a moderate statewide swing that allowed the Democrats to win the popular vote, the Republicans retained their supermajority of 24 seats in the Senate, compared to the Democrats' nine seats.

== Statewide results ==
Party	Candidates	Votes			Seats won		
Party	Candidates	No.	%	+/–	No.	+/–	%
Republican Party	17	1,032,867	47.26	▼7.17	10	0	58.82
Democratic Party	17	1,145,439	52.41	▲6.84	7	0	41.18
Libertarian Party	1	4,037	0.18	▲0.18	0	0	0.00
Green Party	1	3,041	0.14	▲0.14	0	0	0.00
Total	36		100.00		17		100.00

Popular vote
Democratic	52.41%
Republican	47.26%
Other	0.32%

Senate seats won
Republican	58.82%
Democratic	41.18%

== Predictions ==
Source	Ranking	As of
Governing	Safe R	October 8, 2018

== Results by district ==
=== Overview ===
Results of the 2018 Ohio Senate election
District	Incumbent status	Incumbent	Winner	Result
1st	Running	Rob McColley		Incumbent Republican re-elected
3rd	Term-limited	Kevin Bacon	Tina Maharath	Democratic gain
5th	Term-limited	Bill Beagle	Steve Huffman	Republican hold
7th	Running	Steve Wilson		Incumbent Republican re-elected
9th	Running	Cecil Thomas		Incumbent Democrat re-elected
11th	Term-limited	Edna Brown	Teresa Fedor	Democratic hold
13th	Term-limited	Gayle Manning	Nathan Manning	Republican hold
15th	Term-limited	Charleta Tavares	Hearcel Craig	Democratic hold
17th	Running	Bob Peterson		Incumbent Republican re-elected
19th	Term-limited	Kris Jordan	Andrew Brenner	Republican hold
21st	Running	Sandra Williams		Incumbent Democrat re-elected
23rd	Term-limited	Michael Skindell	Nickie Antonio	Democratic hold
25th	Running	Kenny Yuko		Incumbent Democrat re-elected
27th	Term-limited	Frank LaRose	Kristina Roegner	Republican hold
29th	Term-limited	Scott Oelslager	Kirk Schuring	Republican hold
31st	Running	Jay Hottinger		Incumbent Republican re-elected
33rd	Term-limited	Joe Schiavoni	Michael Rulli	Republican gain

=== Detailed results ===
==== District 1 ====
===== Primary results =====
Democratic primary
Party	Candidate	Votes	%
Democratic	Adam Papin	7,150	100.0
Total votes		7,150	100.0

Republican primary
Party	Candidate	Votes	%
Republican	Rob McColley (incumbent)	19,279	61.5
Republican	Craig Kupferberg	6,104	19.5
Republican	Bob Barker, Jr.	5,959	19.0
Total votes		31,342	100.0

===== General election results =====
Ohio's 1st State Senate District, 2018 general election
Party	Candidate	Votes	%
Republican	Rob McColley (incumbent)	89,810	73.3
Democratic	Adam Papin	32,765	26.7
Total votes		122,575	100.0
Republican hold		Swing	▼26.7 (Note: Seat was uncontested in the previous election.)

==== District 3 ====
===== Primary results =====
Democratic primary
Party	Candidate	Votes	%
Democratic	Tina Maharath	11,462	71.8
Democratic	Katherine Chipps (write-in)	4,500	28.2
Total votes		15,962	100.0

Republican primary
Party	Candidate	Votes	%
Republican	Anne Gonzales	14,911	100.0
Total votes		14,911	100.0

===== General election results =====
Ohio's 3rd State Senate District, 2018 general election
Party	Candidate	Votes	%
Democratic	Tina Maharath	66,438	50.3
Republican	Anne Gonzales	65,733	49.7
Total votes		122,575	100.0
Democratic gain from Republican		Swing	▲29.0

==== District 5 ====
===== Primary results =====
Democratic primary
Party	Candidate	Votes	%
Democratic	Paul Bradley	11,731	100.0
Total votes		11,731	100.0

Republican primary
Party	Candidate	Votes	%
Republican	Steve Huffman	18,971	100.0
Total votes		18,971	100.0

===== General election results =====
Ohio's 5th State Senate District, 2018 general election
Party	Candidate	Votes	%
Republican	Steve Huffman	62,574	52.9
Democratic	Paul Bradley	55,669	47.1
Total votes		118,243	100.0
Republican hold		Swing	▼4.1

==== District 7 ====
===== Primary results =====
Democratic primary
Party	Candidate	Votes	%
Democratic	Sara Bitter	11,271	100.0
Total votes		11,271	100.0

Republican primary
Party	Candidate	Votes	%
Republican	Steve Wilson (incumbent)	17,179	57.1
Republican	Brad Lamoreaux	12,926	42.9
Total votes		30,105	100.0

===== General election results =====
Ohio's 7th State Senate District, 2018 general election
Party	Candidate	Votes	%
Republican	Steve Wilson (incumbent)	98,370	62.0
Democratic	Sara Bitter	60,344	38.0
Total votes		158,714	100.0
Republican hold		Swing	▼38.0 (Note: Seat was uncontested in the previous election.)

==== District 9 ====
===== Primary results =====
Democratic primary
Party	Candidate	Votes	%
Democratic	Cecil Thomas (incumbent)	99,205	76.3
Democratic	Dale Mallory	6,522	26.1
Total votes		25,015	100.0

Republican primary
Party	Candidate	Votes	%
Republican	Tom Chandler (write-in)	204	100.0
Total votes		204	100.0

===== General election results =====
Ohio's 9th State Senate District, 2018 general election
Party	Candidate	Votes	%
Democratic	Cecil Thomas (incumbent)	99,205	76.3
Republican	Tom Chandler	30,833	23.7
Total votes		130,038	100.0
Democratic hold		Swing	▲19.1

==== District 11 ====
===== Primary results =====
Democratic primary
Party	Candidate	Votes	%
Democratic	Teresa Fedor	9,858	55.9
Democratic	Michael Ashford	7,771	44.1
Total votes		17,629	100.0

Republican primary
Party	Candidate	Votes	%
Republican	Ernest McCarthy	6,598	100.0
Total votes		6,598	100.0

===== General election results =====
Ohio's 11th State Senate District, 2018 general election
Party	Candidate	Votes	%
Democratic	Teresa Fedor	73,934	69.4
Republican	Ernest McCarthy	32,567	30.6
Total votes		106,501	100.0
Democratic hold		Swing	▲5.0

==== District 13 ====
===== Primary results =====
Democratic primary
Party	Candidate	Votes	%
Democratic	Sharon Sweda	15,837	100.0
Total votes		15,837	100.0

Republican primary
Party	Candidate	Votes	%
Republican	Nathan Manning	13,755	74.7
Republican	Ryan Sawyer	4,668	25.3
Total votes		18,423	100.0

===== General election results =====
Ohio's 13th State Senate District, 2018 general election
Party	Candidate	Votes	%
Republican	Nathan Manning	69,286	52.7
Democratic	Sharon Sweda	58,159	44.2
Libertarian	Homer Taft	4,037	3.1
Total votes		131,482	100.0
Republican hold		Swing	▼10.7

==== District 15 ====
===== Primary results =====
Democratic primary
Party	Candidate	Votes	%
Democratic	Hearcel Craig	20,440	69.8
Democratic	Jodi Howell	8,857	30.2
Total votes		29,297	100.0

Republican primary
Party	Candidate	Votes	%
Republican	Jordan Garcea	5,009	100.0
Total votes		5,009	100.0

===== General election results =====
Ohio's 15th State Senate District, 2018 general election
Party	Candidate	Votes	%
Democratic	Hearcel Craig	107,505	82.5
Republican	Jordan Garcea	22,778	17.5
Total votes		130,283	100.0
Democratic hold		Swing	▲6.1

==== District 17 ====
===== Primary results =====
Democratic primary
Party	Candidate	Votes	%
Democratic	Scott Dailey	8,493	100.0
Total votes		8,493	100.0

Republican primary
Party	Candidate	Votes	%
Republican	Bob Peterson (incumbent)	23,326	100.0
Total votes		23,326	100.0

===== General election results =====
Ohio's 17th State Senate District, 2018 general election
Party	Candidate	Votes	%
Republican	Bob Peterson (incumbent)	79,880	70.4
Democratic	Scott Dailey	33,573	29.6
Total votes		113,453	100.0
Republican hold		Swing	▼29.6 (Note: Seat was uncontested in the previous election.)

==== District 19 ====
===== Primary results =====
Democratic primary
Party	Candidate	Votes	%
Democratic	Louise Valentine	17,349	100.0
Total votes		17,349	100.0

Republican primary
Party	Candidate	Votes	%
Republican	Andrew Brenner	17,924	67.4
Republican	Joel Spitzer	8,673	32.6
Total votes		26,597	100.0

===== General election results =====
Ohio's 19th State Senate District, 2018 general election
Party	Candidate	Votes	%
Republican	Andrew Brenner	81,623	50.4
Democratic	Louise Valentine	77,247	47.7
Green	David Cox	3,041	1.9
Total votes		161,911	100.0
Republican hold		Swing	▼10.7

==== District 21 ====
===== Primary results =====
Democratic primary
Party	Candidate	Votes	%
Democratic	Sandra Williams (incumbent)	19,210	59.6
Democratic	Jeffrey Johnson	7,595	23.5
Democratic	Bill Patmon	4,798	14.9
Democratic	Willie Britt	653	2.0
Total votes		32,256	100.0

Republican primary
Party	Candidate	Votes	%
Republican	Thomas Pekarek (write-in)	198	100.0
Total votes		198	100.0

===== General election results =====
Ohio's 21st State Senate District, 2018 general election
Party	Candidate	Votes	%
Democratic	Sandra Williams	97,282	87.7
Republican	Thomas Pekarek	13,621	12.3
Total votes		110,903	100.0
Democratic hold		Swing	▲1.0

==== District 23 ====
===== Primary results =====
Democratic primary
Party	Candidate	Votes	%
Democratic	Nickie Antonio	15,282	54.6
Democratic	Martin Sweeney	12,699	45.4
Total votes		27,981	100.0

Republican primary
Party	Candidate	Votes	%
Republican	Steve Flores (write-in)	581	100.0
Total votes		581	100.0

===== General election results =====
Ohio's 23rd State Senate District, 2018 general election
Party	Candidate	Votes	%
Democratic	Nickie Antonio	69,907	65.4
Republican	Steve Flores	36,968	34.6
Total votes		106,875	100.0
Democratic hold		Swing	▲3.0

==== District 25 ====
===== Primary results =====
Democratic primary
Party	Candidate	Votes	%
Democratic	Kenny Yuko (Incumbent)	18,094	58.9
Democratic	John Barnes, Jr.	12,625	41.1
Total votes		30,719	100.0

Republican primary
Party	Candidate	Votes	%
Republican	Bob Murphy	9,011	100.0
Total votes		9,011	100.0

===== General election results =====
Ohio's 25th State Senate District, 2018 general election
Party	Candidate	Votes	%
Democratic	Kenny Yuko (incumbent)	97,503	75.0
Republican	William Faehnrich (Note: Bob Murphy died after winning the primary and was replaced with Faehnrich by the county Republican parties.)	32,506	25.0
Total votes		130,009	100.0
Democratic hold		Swing	▼0.5

==== District 27 ====
===== Primary results =====
Democratic primary
Party	Candidate	Votes	%
Democratic	Adam VanHo	14,520	100.0
Total votes		14,520	100.0

Republican primary
Party	Candidate	Votes	%
Republican	Kristina Roegner	21,381	100.0
Total votes		21,381	100.0

===== General election results =====
Ohio's 27th State Senate District, 2018 general election
Party	Candidate	Votes	%
Republican	Kristina Roegner	84,031	58.5
Democratic	Adam VanHo	59,711	41.5
Total votes		143,742	100.0
Republican hold		Swing	▼9.2

==== District 29 ====
===== Primary results =====
Democratic primary
Party	Candidate	Votes	%
Democratic	Lauren Friedman	16,276	100.0
Total votes		16,276	100.0

Republican primary
Party	Candidate	Votes	%
Republican	Kirk Schuring	22,314	100.0
Total votes		22,314	100.0

===== General election results =====
Ohio's 29th State Senate District, 2018 general election
Party	Candidate	Votes	%
Republican	Kirk Schuring	75,449	59.7
Democratic	Lauren Friedman	50,932	40.3
Total votes		126,381	100.0
Republican hold		Swing	▼6.9

==== District 31 ====
===== Primary results =====
Democratic primary
Party	Candidate	Votes	%
Democratic	Melinda Miller	11,946	100.0
Total votes		11,946	100.0

Republican primary
Party	Candidate	Votes	%
Republican	Jay Hottinger (incumbent)	24,600	100.0
Total votes		24,600	100.0

===== General election results =====
Ohio's 31st State Senate District, 2018 general election
Party	Candidate	Votes	%
Republican	Jay Hottinger (incumbent)	86,019	66.9
Democratic	Melinda Miller	42,578	33.1
Total votes		128,597	100.0
Republican hold		Swing	▲1.9

==== District 33 ====
===== Primary results =====
Democratic primary
Party	Candidate	Votes	%
Democratic	John Boccieri	23,583	100.0
Total votes		23,583	100.0

Republican primary
Party	Candidate	Votes	%
Republican	Michael Rulli	16,617	100.0
Total votes		16,617	100.0

===== General election results =====
Ohio's 33rd State Senate District, 2018 general election
Party	Candidate	Votes	%
Republican	Michael Rulli	66,731	52.4
Democratic	John Boccieri	60,575	47.6
Total votes		127,306	100.0
Republican gain from Democratic		Swing	▲52.4 (Note: Seat was uncontested in the previous election.)
