= Jason Stephens =

Jason Stephens may refer to:

- Jason Stephens (television producer), Australian actor and comedian
- Jason Stephens (politician), Ohio state representative

== See also ==
- Jason Stevens (born 1973), former rugby league footballer
- Jason Stevens, protagonist of the 2006 film The Ultimate Gift
- Jay Stephens (born 1971), Canadian cartoonist
