= Ohio's 17th senatorial district =

State electoral district in Ohio, U.S.

Ohio's 17th State Senate district
Senator
Shane Wilkin; R–Hillsboro
- Demographics: 92.1% White; 3.4% Black; 1.1% Hispanic; 0.6% Asian; 2.3% Native American; 0.1% Hawaiian/Pacific Islander
- Population (2020) • Voting age • Citizens of voting age: 350,486; 271,424; 272,579

After the 2023 redistricting, Ohio's 17th senatorial district was changed to represent a large group of counties in South Central Ohio, including Fayette, Highland, Ross, Pike, Hocking, Vinton, Jackson, and Laurence Counties. The distrct now encompasses the House districts of 91, 92 and 93. The current Ohio Senator is Republican Shane Wilkin.

== 2026 election results ==
The following results are yet certified: Shane Wilkin (R) 74,615 68.3% Brian A Dear (D) 34,679 31.7%

== Historically ==
Before the 2023 Redistricting, Ohio's 17th district had long been located in southeastern Ohio and currently consists of the counties of Ross, Fayette, Clinton, Highland, Pike, Jackson and Gallia as well as portions of the counties of Lawrence, Vinton and Pickaway. It encompassed Ohio House districts 91, 92 and 93. It has a Cook PVI of R+25.

== List of senators ==
Senator	Party	Term	Notes
Harry Armstrong	Republican	January 3, 1967 – December 31, 1974	Armstrong lost the party nomination in 1974 to Oakley C. Collins.
Oakley C. Collins	Republican	January 3, 1975 – December 31, 1986	Collins lost re-election in 1986 to Jan Michael Long.
Jan Michael Long	Democrat	January 2, 1987 – February 8, 1997	Long resigned to take a seat on the Pickaway County Court of Common Pleas.
Michael Shoemaker	Democrat	February 5, 1997 – December 31, 2002	Shoemaker lost re-election in 2002 to John Carey.
John Carey	Republican	January 6, 2003 – December 31, 2010	Carey was term-limited in 2010.
David T. Daniels	Republican	January 3, 2011 – April 24, 2012	Daniels resigned in 2012 to become Director of the Ohio Department of Agriculture.
Bob Peterson	Republican	May 24, 2012 – December 31, 2022	Peterson was term-limited in 2022.
Shane Wilkin	Republican	January 3, 2023 – present	Incumbent
