= Dave Hall (Ohio state representative) =

American politician

Member of the Ohio House of Representatives from the 70th district
- In office January 5, 2009-December 31, 2016
- Preceded by: Bob Gibbs
- Succeeded by: Darrell Kick

Personal details
- Born: November 28, 1960 (age 65) Millersburg, Ohio, U.S.
- Party: Republican
- Profession: Recreation Director

Dave Hall (born November 28, 1960) is a former Republican member of the Ohio House of Representatives, representing Ohio's 70th House District from 2009 to 2016.

== Career ==
Before being elected State Representative, Hall served for more than a decade as County Commissioner in Holmes County. He is a former Park District Director for Holmes County, as well as County Recreation Director. Hall is a past president of the Ohio Mid-Eastern Governments Association (OMEGA), the Family and Children First Council, and the Multi-County Juvenile Detention Board.

Hall is a member of the Ashland, Holmes and Medina County Chambers of Commerce, and is also a member of the Ohio Farm Bureau.

== Ohio House of Representatives ==
When incumbent Bob Gibbs decided to run for the Ohio Senate, Hall sought to replace him. Unopposed in the primary, Hall went on to face Democrat Luke Brewer in the general election. He went on to defeat Brewer with 60.88% of the votes.

In 2010, he won reelection with 68.8% of the vote. For his second term, Speaker of the House William G. Batchelder named Hall as Chairman of the Agriculture and Natural Resources Committee. Hall was also appointed to the Finance Committee, the Finance Subcommittee on Agriculture and Natural Resources, the Local Government Committee. Additionally, although initially appointed to the Small Business and Economic Development Committee, he was re-appointed to the Public Utilities Committee for the duration of the 129th General Assembly.

In 2012, he won reelection with 60.46% of the vote. Due to Ohio's decennial redistricting and reapportionment, Hall was elected the 70th District. In the 130th General Assembly, Speaker of the House William G. Batchelder reappointed him Chairman of the Agriculture and Natural Resources Committee. Hall was also appointed to the Finance Committee, Finance Subcommittee on Agriculture and Development, and the newly created Manufacturing and Workforce Development Committee.

As Chairman of the Agriculture and Natural Resources Committee, Hall served as a Legislative member of the Emergency Response Commission, the Environmental Education Council, and the Ohio Expositions Commission.

== Awards ==
For his work in the Ohio House of Representatives, Hall has received "Watchdog of the Treasury" (2010 and 2012) from United Conservatives of Ohio; "2011 Legislator of the Year" from the Ohio Parks and Recreation Association; the "2012 Robert W. Wilkinson" award from the Ohio Aggregates and Industrial Minerals Association; "2012 Legislator of the Year" from the Ohio Farmers Union; and the "2013 Legislator of the Year" from the Ohio Nursery and Landscape Association.

In 2007, Hall received "Volunteer of the Year" from the Holmes County Park District.
