= Gary Scherer =

American politician

Member of the Ohio House of Representatives from the 92nd district
- In office April 24, 2012 – December 31, 2020
- Preceded by: Bob Peterson
- Succeeded by: Mark Johnson

Personal details
- Party: Republican
- Spouse: Debbie Scherer
- Education: Miami University, Ohio; Ohio State University (BS)
- Profession: Accountant, businessman

Gary Scherer is a Republican member of the Ohio House of Representatives for the 92nd district, which includes Fayette County, as well as portions of Pickaway and Ross counties. He was appointed in April 2012 to replace Bob Peterson, who was appointed to the Ohio Senate.

Scherer has a degree in accounting from Ohio State University, and worked as an accountant and businessman before becoming a Representative. He is married with three children.

Scherer was term-limited following his fourth term, which concludes in 2020. He served as the Vice Chair of the Ways and Means Committee and was a member of the Finance Committee during his terms. He ran for Commissioner of Pickaway County, Ohio in 2020, defeated his primary opponent, and will advance to the general election unopposed.

== Electoral history ==
=== Ohio House of Representatives ===
Ohio House of Representatives general election, 2012
Party	Candidate	Votes	%
Republican	Gary Scherer	23,000	52.5
Democratic	Robert P. Armstrong	20,780	47.5

Ohio House of Representatives Republican primary, 2014
Party	Candidate	Votes	%
Republican	Gary Scherer	2,985	73.2
Republican	Kirk Stinson	1,093	26.8

Ohio House of Representatives general election, 2014
Party	Candidate	Votes	%
Republican	Gary Scherer		100.0

Ohio House of Representatives general election, 2016
Party	Candidate	Votes	%
Republican	Gary Scherer		100.0

Ohio House of Representatives general election, 2018
Party	Candidate	Votes	%
Republican	Gary Scherer	23,795	64.2
Democratic	Beth Workman	13,247	35.8

=== County Commissioner ===
Pickaway County Commissioner Republican primary, 2020
Party	Candidate	Votes	%
Republican	Gary Scherer	3,061	65.4
Republican	Dale Hoover	1,621	34.6
