= Shayla Davis =

American politician

Member of the Ohio House of Representatives from the 11th district
- In office February 17, 2022 – December 31, 2022
- Preceded by: Stephanie Howse
- Succeeded by: Anita Somani

Personal details
- Party: Independent (since 2022)
- Other political affiliations: Democratic (until 2022)
- Education: Cleveland State University (BA, JD); John Carroll University (MA)

Shayla L. Davis is an American politician who served as a member of the Ohio House of Representatives from the 11th district in 2022.

== Early life and education ==
Davis is a native of Garfield Heights, Ohio. She earned a Bachelor of Arts degree in liberal arts and non-profit administration from Cleveland State University, a Master of Arts in non-profit administration from John Carroll University, and a Juris Doctor from the Cleveland–Marshall College of Law.

== Career ==
From 2008 to 2011, Davis worked as a program and event coordinator at Cleveland State University. She also held positions in the Cleveland Department of Public Health and Cleveland Office of Minority Health. From 2015 to 2017, she served as a law clerk and mediator for the Cleveland Municipal Court. From 2017 to 2019, she served as a program coordinator for the Cuyahoga County Board of Health. From 2019 to 2021, she served as a member of the Garfield Heights, Ohio City Council. Davis was appointed to the Ohio House of Representatives in February 2022.

In August 2022, Secretary of State Frank LaRose ruled that Davis would not be able to run for a full term in the House after it was found that she "did not disaffiliate from the Democratic Party in good faith."
