= Council of Smaller Enterprises =

The Council of Smaller Enterprises (COSE) is a division of the Greater Cleveland Partnership and an organization that coordinates the activities of, and provides resources and advocacy for small businesses in the Greater Cleveland area. It is the largest regional small business group in the United States.

== Advocacy ==
In 1991, John Polk, the head of the organization at the time, spoke out against mandates requiring employers to provide health insurance, arguing that such mandates hurt small employers, as those businesses were least able to afford health insurance. In 2005, the organization advocated for health care reform at the national level, particularly focusing on reforms aimed at reducing health care costs.

== Energy ==
COSE offers energy solutions that enable its members to save on energy costs and install more energy-efficient systems. It partnered with Metrus Energy and CalCEF to create the Ohio Efficiency Resource Program, a financial tool that allows COSE members to implement energy-efficient programs with no upfront cost or risk.

== Small Business Convention ==
The COSE Small Business Convention, the largest event hosted by COSE, takes place annually. Last year, the convention was hosted in Sandusky, Ohio at the Kalahari Convention Center. The COSE Small Business Convention is the largest in the Midwest.
