= Al Landis =

American politician (born 1954)

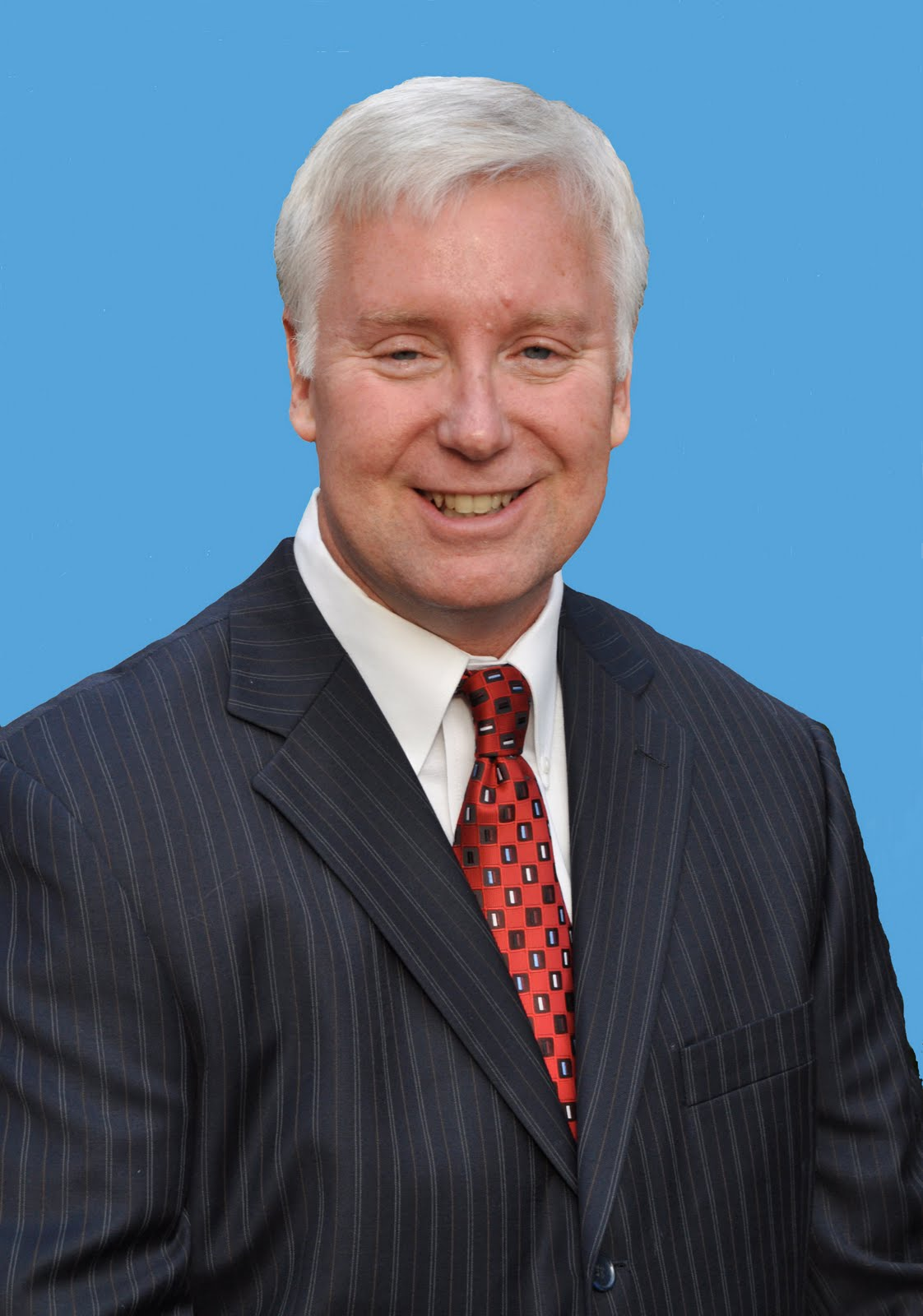

Member of the Ohio Senate from the 31st district
- Incumbent
- Assumed office January 3, 2023
- Preceded by: Jay Hottinger

Member of the Ohio House of Representatives from the 98th district
- In office January 3, 2011 – December 31, 2018
- Preceded by: Joshua O'Farrell
- Succeeded by: Brett Hillyer

Personal details
- Born: November 2, 1954 (age 71) Dover, Ohio, U.S.
- Party: Republican
- Education: Dover High School
- Profession: Sales Executive

Al Landis (born November 2, 1954) is an American politician who has served as a member of the Ohio Senate, representing the 31st district, since 2023. He is a former member of the Ohio House of Representatives, where he served from 2011 to 2018.

== Ohio House of Representatives ==
As a member of the Ohio House of Representatives, Landis supported the controversial Ohio Senate Bill 5 which placed dramatic restrictions on the collective bargaining rights of public employee unions.

Landis was sworn into his first term on January 3, 2011, and is a member of the committees on Agriculture and Natural Resources, Economic and Small Business Development, Public Utilities, and Veterans Affairs (as vice chair).

In 2014, Landis was reelected for a third term, defeating his Democratic opponent with 67.71% of the vote.
