= Dale Martin (Ohio politician) =

21st-century American politician

Member of the Ohio Senate from the 21st District
- In office June 7, 2022 – December 31, 2022
- Preceded by: Sandra Williams
- Succeeded by: Kent Smith

Personal details
- Party: Democratic

Dale Martin is an American electrician and politician who served in the Ohio Senate from Ohio's 21st district. He was appointed to the seat after incumbent Democrat Sandra Williams resigned to accept a job in the private sector. He was selected to replace Williams and was sworn in on June 7, 2022. Prior to being sworn into the Ohio State Senate, he worked as an electrician in the Cleveland area for 26 years.
