= Ohio's 21st senatorial district =

American legislative district

Ohio's 21st State Senate district
Senator
Kent Smith; D–Euclid
- Demographics: 32% White; 62% Black; 2.8% Hispanic; 2.8% Asian; 1.3% Native American; 0.1% Hawaiian/Pacific Islander
- Population (2020) • Voting age • Citizens of voting age: 375,348; 294,505; 281,722

Ohio's 21st senatorial district after the 2023 Redistricting the 21 senatorial district is made up of the city of Cleveland and contains the House Districts 18, 21 and 22.

The current Ohio senator is Democrat Kent Smith and was reelected for another term in November 2026.

== 2026 Election Results ==
Kent Smith (D) 117,874 87.5%

Mikhail Alterman (R) 16,916 12.6%

== Historically ==
Before the 2023 redistricting, Ohio's 21st senatorial district was based in urban Cleveland, Ohio, and consists primarily of Cleveland's West Side neighborhoods of Ohio City and Tremont; Downtown Cleveland; all of Cleveland's East Side neighborhoods; and the cities of Bratenahl, Cleveland Heights, and Shaker Heights. It encompasses Ohio House districts 9, 10 and 11. It has a Cook PVI of D+34.

== List of senators ==
Senator	Party	Term	Notes
Morris Jackson	Democrat	January 3, 1967 – March 17, 1984	Jackson resigned prior to the expiration of his term in 1986.
Michael R. White	Democrat	May 17, 1984 – December 31, 1989	White resigned in 1989 to become mayor of Cleveland, Ohio.
Jeff Johnson	Democrat	January 3, 1990 – December 31, 1998	Johnson did not seek re-election in 1998.
C.J. Prentiss	Democrat	January 5, 1999 – December 31, 2006	Prentiss was term-limited in 2006.
Shirley Smith	Democrat	January 2, 2007 – November 30, 2014	Smith was term-limited and resigned prior to the expiration of her term.
Sandra Williams	Democrat	January 5, 2015 – June 1, 2022	Williams was term-limited and resigned prior to the expiration of her term.
Dale Martin	Democrat	June 7, 2022 – December 31, 2022	Martin was not a candidate in the August 2, 2022, Democratic primary.
Kent Smith	Democrat	January 3, 2023 – present	Incumbent
