= Darrell Kick =

American politician (born 1968)

Member of the Ohio House of Representatives from the 98th district
- Incumbent
- Assumed office January 3, 2023
- Preceded by: Brett Hillyer

Member of the Ohio House of Representatives from the 70th district
- In office January 3, 2017 – December 31, 2022
- Preceded by: Dave Hall
- Succeeded by: Brian Lampton

Personal details
- Born: December 30, 1968 (age 57)
- Party: Republican
- Spouse: Erin R. Kick

Darrell D. Kick (born December 30, 1968) is the state representative for the 98th district of the Ohio House of Representatives. He is a Republican. The district consists of Ashland County as well as portions of Holmes, Knox, and Coshocton counties.

== Life and career ==
Kick was born and raised in Loudonville, Ohio, where he was a family farmer and still farms today. An ardent Republican, Kick was involved in Republican politics for many years before becoming a state representative.

When Bob Gibbs was elected to Congress in 2010, Kick was hired by Gibbs to serve as one of his district liaisons. Gibbs previously represented the predecessor to the 70th House district.

== Ohio House of Representatives ==
When Representative Dave Hall was term-limited in 2016, Kick decided to run for the seat. Against two other Republicans, Kick inched out a win, besting second place candidate Lisa Woods by 107 votes.

In an incredibly Republican district, Kick won the general election with over 71% of the vote against independent Luke Brewer.

In 2019, Kick co-sponsored legislation that would ban abortion in Ohio and criminalize what they called "abortion murder". Doctors who performed abortions in cases of ectopic pregnancy and other life-threatening conditions would be exempt from prosecution only if they "[took] all possible steps to preserve the life of the unborn child, while preserving the life of the woman. Such steps include, if applicable, attempting to reimplant an ectopic pregnancy into the woman's uterus". Reimplantation of an ectopic pregnancy is not a recognized or medically feasible procedure.

Political offices
Preceded by Dave Hall	Ohio House of Representatives, 70th District; 2017–present	Incumbent
