= Tom Young (Ohio politician) =

American politician

Member of the Ohio House of Representatives from the 37th district
- Incumbent
- Assumed office January 3, 2023
- Preceded by: Casey Weinstein

Member of the Ohio House of Representatives from the 42nd district
- In office January 4, 2021 – December 31, 2022
- Preceded by: Niraj Antani
- Succeeded by: Derek Merrin

Personal details
- Party: Republican

Tom Young is a Republican member of the Ohio House of Representatives representing the 37th district.

Born in Dayton and raised in Miamisburg, Young currently resides in Washington Township. Before entering the legislature, he served on the Montgomery County Board of Elections and the Wright State University Board of Trustees, and worked as a senior vice president in wealth management. He first attempted to run for House District 42 in 2014, but could not gain enough support from the Montgomery County Republican party, losing the nomination to now State Senator Niraj Antani.

Young ran again in 2020 following Antani's elevation to the state Senate, and was elected unopposed to represent District 42. He was sworn in to the Ohio House in January 2021, and later represented the 37th district following redistricting.

== Committee assignments ==
As of June 2026, Young serves on the following committees in the Ohio House.

- Workforce and Higher Education (chair)
- Finance
- Financial Institutions
- Public Insurance and Pensions
