= Mark Johnson (Ohio politician) =

American politician

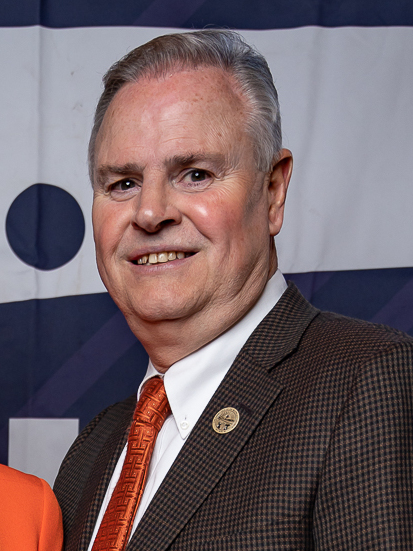
- Johnson in 2023

Member of the Ohio House of Representatives from the 92nd district
- Incumbent
- Assumed office January 1, 2021
- Preceded by: Gary Scherer

Personal details
- Party: Republican

Mark Johnson is an American politician who is an Ohio state representative in Ohio's 92nd district. He won the seat after incumbent Republican Gary Scherer became term–limited after completing his fourth term in 2020. He defeated Democrat Beth Workman in 2020, winning 67.0% to 33.0%. He was to face Republican Caleb Johnson in a primary election, but Caleb Johnson dropped out of the race prior to the scheduled primary election.
