= Jim Hoops =

American politician

- Hoops in 2025

Member of the Ohio House of Representatives from the 81st district
- Incumbent
- Assumed office January 17, 2018
- Preceded by: Rob McColley
- In office January 1, 1999 – December 31, 2006
- Preceded by: Lynn Wachtmann
- Succeeded by: Lynn Wachtmann

Personal details
- Party: Republican
- Education: Northwestern State University (BS)

James M. "Jim" Hoops is an American statesman (politician) who has served as a member of the Ohio House of Representatives. Appointed in 2018, he previously served four terms representing the same seat from 1999 to 2006. As Henry County Auditor, Hoops opted to succeed Lynn Wachtmann, who was running for the Ohio Senate, and won his seat in 1998. He went on to win reelection in 2000, 2002 and in 2004.

By 2006, Hoops was term limited, and was unable to seek another term in the House. Instead, he opted to run for the Ohio Senate, to again succeed Wachtmann. However, Steve Buehrer, another Republican term-limited Representative, was opting for the seat as well. However, he lost the nomination for the seat, ending his time in the legislature. He has since returned to Napoleon, Ohio and to the private sector.

In 2018, Hoops returned to the Ohio House of Representatives to succeed Rob McColley, who was appointed to the Ohio Senate following Senator Cliff Hite's resignation due to sexual harassment allegations. He won a full term in 2018.

In 2025, Hoops announced his run to the Ohio Senate to succeed Rob McColley.

== Links ==
- Representative James M. Hoops (official site)

Jim Hoops for Ohio State Senate First District
