= Matt Huffman =

American politician (born 1960)

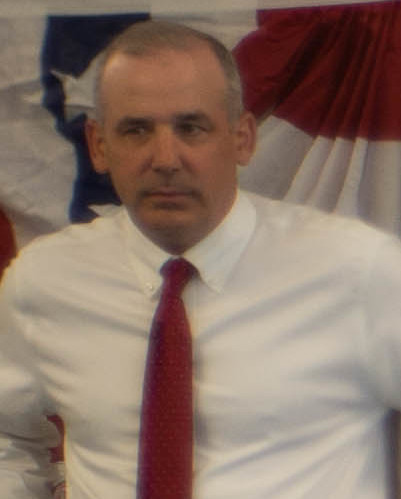
- Huffman in 2014

107th Speaker of the Ohio House of Representatives
- Incumbent
- Assumed office January 6, 2025
- Preceded by: Jason Stephens

Member of the Ohio House of Representatives
- Incumbent
- Assumed office January 6, 2025
- Preceded by: Susan Manchester
- Constituency: 78th district
- In office January 2, 2007 – December 31, 2014
- Preceded by: John R. Willamowski
- Succeeded by: Robert Cupp
- Constituency: 4th district

96th President of the Ohio Senate
- In office January 4, 2021 – December 31, 2024
- Preceded by: Larry Obhof
- Succeeded by: Rob McColley

Majority Leader of the Ohio Senate
- In office February 6, 2019 – January 4, 2021
- Preceded by: Randy Gardner
- Succeeded by: Kirk Schuring

Member of the Ohio Senate from the 12th district
- In office January 3, 2017 – December 31, 2024
- Preceded by: Keith Faber
- Succeeded by: Susan Manchester

Personal details
- Born: Matthew C. Huffman; April 1, 1960 (age 66) Lima, Ohio, U.S.
- Party: Republican
- Education: University of Notre Dame (BA); University of Cincinnati (JD)

Matthew C. Huffman (born April 1, 1960) is an American politician serving as a member of the Ohio House of Representatives, representing the 78th district since 2025, while concurrently serving as Speaker of the House as a Republican. The district includes all of Allen County and a portion of northern Auglaize County.

Huffman is the former Speaker Pro Tempore of the Ohio House of Representatives, and served in the House from 2007 to 2014. Prior to his service in the House, he served as president of Lima City Council for seven years. He is an attorney with Lima law firm, Huffman, Kelley, Brock & Gottschalk. From 2017 to 2025, he represented the 12th district in the Ohio Senate, serving as Ohio Senate President from 2021 to 2025.

== Career ==
A graduate of the University of Notre Dame and the University of Cincinnati, Huffman is an attorney with Lima law firm Huffman, Kelley, Brock & Gottschalk and previously served as president of Lima City Council for seven years.

When John R. Willamowski was ineligible to run for another term, Huffman entered the race to succeed him. Huffman ultimately won in the overwhelmingly Republican district, and took a seat on January 2, 2007. He won reelection in 2008, and 2010.

In the 128th General Assembly, Huffman was chosen by House Republicans to serve as the Chairman of the Ohio House Republican Organizational Committee. After a strong showing and a take-back of the Majority for the 129th General Assembly, Huffman is serving as majority floor leader. He also is a member of the Education Committee; the Judiciary and Ethics Committee; the State Government and Elections Committee and the State Government and Elections Subcommittee on Redistricting (as Chair); as a member of the Joint Legislative Ethics Committee, and on the Ohio Legislative Service Commission.

Huffman won a fourth term in 2012 with 67% of the vote against Democrat Robert Huenke.

== Ohio Senate ==
Sitting out two years from elected office, Huffman decided to run for the Ohio Senate in 2016 to succeed term-limited President of the Ohio Senate Keith Faber, who in turn was running for the House. Facing John Adams in the Republican primary, a former ally and friend from his House days, Huffman won the nomination with nearly 64% of the vote. He was unopposed in the general election.

== Positions and policies ==
Huffman has introduced measures that would increase from 70 to 75 the maximum age at which an attorney could seek election as a judge. Proponents include the Supreme Court of Ohio, the Ohio State Bar Association and the Association of Municipal/County Judges. Ultimately, the legislation passed the Ohio House of Representatives 70–17 and with passage by the Senate, will go to the ballot in November 2011. In talking of his support of the measure, Huffman has acknowledged that in the 129th Ohio General Assembly, the Ohio House of Representatives has members ranging from ages 21 to 77.

He has also sought to abolish a Bureau of Motor Vehicles program which randomly sends out about 5,400 letters each week requiring Ohio drivers send in proof of insurance, stating "chronically uninsured," people who can't afford insurance or have multiple license suspensions, find ways around the verification program because they need to drive to work. "We're not going to solve that problem."

A supporter of S.B. 5 which looks to limit collective bargaining, Huffman says that the bill controls government, and brings fairness and transparency to the public.

Huffman is a supporter of a provision that is set to allow drilling in state parks, saying that it could be an asset to helping to reinvigorate Ohio's lackluster economy if it takes off. He voted for its passage out of the Ohio House of Representatives.

In 2021, he voted for legislation that would make it harder to build wind and solar energy projects in Ohio. Solar and wind energy projects could be killed by local officials, whereas natural gas and oil projects could not. Huffman argued that this discrepancy was warranted because renewable energy production did not produce enough energy in Ohio.

In 2019, Huffman co-sponsored Ohio Senate Bill 23, widely known as the "Heartbeat Bill." The legislation prohibited most abortions once cardiac activity is detected in an embryo, typically around six weeks into pregnancy. The bill does not include exceptions for rape or incest. Governor Mike DeWine signed the bill into law on April 11, 2019. In November 2023, voters overturned the law by passing an amendment to the state's constitution that codified abortion rights up to the point of fetal viability.

== Controversies ==
Matt Huffman has been accused of gerrymandering and being in contempt of court after the Ohio Supreme Court ruled three separate maps drawn under him and representative Bob Cupp to be unconstitutional under the Ohio Constitution. This incident, along with further alleged attempts to gerrymander was featured on the episode Mapmaker, Mapmaker, Make Me a Map of the Chicago Public Radio show and podcast This American Life. Matt Huffman has argued that he should not be held in contempt because of an obscure legal theory called "The independent state legislature doctrine" which claims state legislatures have more power than state supreme courts. However, this has been historically rejected by the U.S. Supreme Court, but which was set to be tested again as of 2022, in a case brought by fair-election campaigners.

Ohio Senate
Preceded by Randy Gardner	Majority Leader of the Ohio Senate; 2019–2021	Succeeded by Kirk Schuring
Preceded by Larry Obhof	President of the Ohio Senate; 2021–2025	Succeeded by Rob McColley
Ohio House of Representatives
Preceded by Jason Stephens	Speaker of the Ohio House of Representatives; 2025–present	Incumbent
