= Cindy Abrams =

American politician (born 1973)

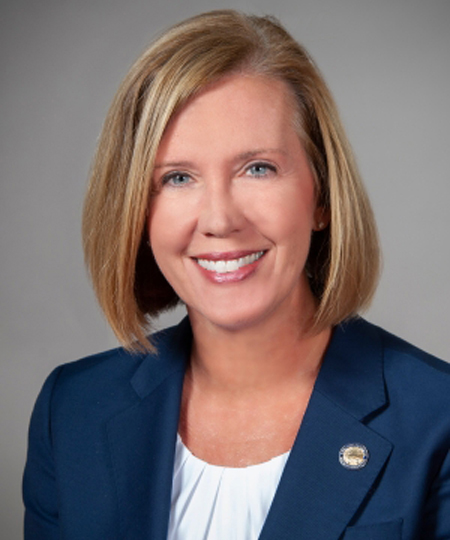

Member of the Ohio House of Representatives from the 29th district
- Incumbent
- Assumed office October 10, 2019
- Preceded by: Louis Blessing

Personal details
- Born: November 19, 1973 (age 52)
- Party: Republican
- Spouse: Doug Abrams
- Children: 2
- Education: Indiana University

Cindy Abrams (born November 19, 1973) is an American politician who has served as a member of the Ohio House of Representatives since 2019. A Republican, Abrams represents the 29th district of Ohio, which consists of portions of southwestern Hamilton County.

Abrams received her bachelor's degree in criminal justice from Indiana University. Prior to her election to the house, she worked as a police officer in the Cincinnati Police Department for seven years and then worked for the multi-level marketing company Pampered Chef. After volunteering for the city of Harrison's planning commission, she successfully ran for city council in 2016 and unsuccessfully ran for mayor in 2020. In 2019, she was elected as state representative for the 29th district, succeeding Louis Blessing, who did not run for re-election due to term limits. She was subsequently re-elected in 2020.

Abrams lives in Harrison with her husband Doug, who works as a sergeant in Evendale. They have two sons.
