= Casey Weinstein =

American politician (born 1982)

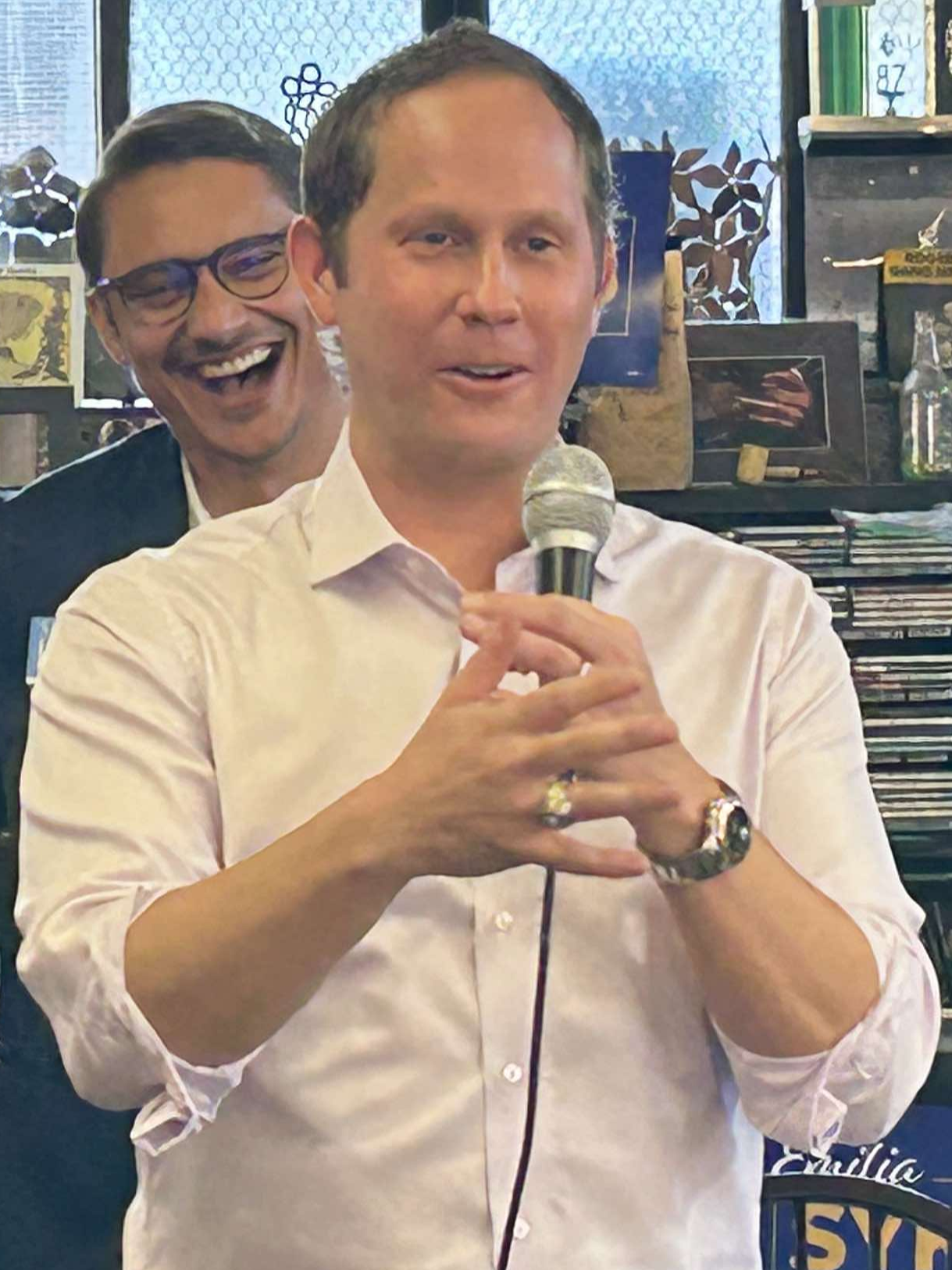
- Weinstein in 2024

Member of the Ohio Senate from the 28th district
- Incumbent
- Assumed office January 6, 2025
- Preceded by: Vernon Sykes

Member of the Ohio House of Representatives
- In office January 3, 2023 – December 31, 2024
- Preceded by: Emilia Sykes
- Succeeded by: Derrick Hall
- Constituency: 34th district
- In office January 7, 2019 – December 31, 2022
- Preceded by: Kristina Roegner
- Succeeded by: Tom Young
- Constituency: 37th district

Personal details
- Born: August 27, 1982 (age 44)
- Party: Democratic
- Spouse: Amanda Weinstein
- Education: United States Air Force Academy (BS); Ohio State University (MBA)

Military service
- Allegiance: United States
- Branch/service: United States Air Force
- Years of service: 2004–2007

Casey M. Weinstein (born August 27, 1982) is an American Air Force veteran and politician who is the State Senator for Ohio Senate district 28. Weinstein won his 2024 campaign for district 28, which includes the communities of Akron, Hudson, Stow, Munroe Falls, Silver Lake, Tallmadge, Fairlawn, part of Mogadore, Lakemore, Portage Lakes, Green, and New Franklin.

Weinstein was first elected to the Ohio House of Representatives in 2018, making him one of six Democratic candidates to flip previously Republican-held seats. He served three consecutive terms in the Ohio House, winning re-election in 2020 and 2022, representing district 37 and then district 34, which consisted of portions of Summit County. He has championed veterans, education, children's healthcare, and renewable energy initiatives during his time in office.

== Legislative initiatives ==
=== Puppy mill regulation legislation (2025) ===
In November 2025, Weinstein introduced legislation aimed at strengthening Ohio's regulations on high-volume dog breeders. The proposal sought to increase oversight of commercial breeding operations and address the state's ranking among the nation's worst for puppy mill conditions. Weinstein stated that Ohio "can do better" in protecting companion animals and emphasized the need for updated standards and enforcement mechanisms.

== Personal and professional background ==
Weinstein is a 2004 graduate of the United States Air Force Academy and served on Active Duty at Wright-Patterson Air Force Base, which brought him and his family to Ohio. He is Jewish.

He received an MBA from The Ohio State University's Fisher College of Business in 2007. In Dayton, he was recognized as a 'Top 40 Under 40' Community Leader and has more recently been recognized as one of '30 for the Future' by the Greater Akron Chamber of Commerce.

Prior to his election to the Ohio House, Weinstein was elected to serve on Hudson City Council from 2016 to 2019.

He currently works as a Director for ServiceNow, managing a team overseeing the Department of the Air Force business.

=== Family background ===
Casey M. Weinstein is the son of Mikey Weinstein, a former U.S. Air Force officer and founder of the Military Religious Freedom Foundation, who was involved in a lawsuit against the Air Force alleging unconstitutional religious influence at the United States Air Force Academy.

== Ohio Senate ==
=== Election ===
Weinstein defeated Republican Jon Leissler in the general election for Ohio State Senate district 28 on November 5, 2024.

=== Committees and appointments ===
Weinstein currently serves on the Addiction and Community Revitalization Committee, Energy Committee, and Higher Education Committee. He serves as a ranking member on the Armed Services, Veterans Affairs and Public Safety Committee and the Government Oversight and Reform Commission.

== Ohio House of Representatives ==
=== Election ===
After an unsuccessful campaign in 2016, Weinstein was elected in the general election on November 6, 2018, winning 51 percent of the vote over 49 percent of Republican candidate Mike Rasor. Weinstein's victory flipped the seat from Republican control to Democratic control. Weinstein slightly increased his margin of victory while successfully running for reelection in 2020.

=== Committees and special appointments ===
Over his three terms in the Ohio House, Weinstein served on: the Agriculture and Rural Development, Armed Services and Veterans Affairs, and Energy and Natural Resources Committees, and served as Ranking Member of the House Public Utilities Committee.

He was appointed by Governor DeWine to serve on the state's Holocaust and Genocide Memorial Education Commission, which was established by legislation in December 2020.

== Ohio Senate ==
=== Election ===
In November 2024, Weinstein was elected to represent the 28th district in the Ohio Senate.

== Election history ==
Ohio House 37th district
| Year | Democrat | Votes | Pct | Republican | Votes | Pct |
|---|---|---|---|---|---|---|
| 2016 | Casey Weinstein | 26,675 | 42.90% | Kristina Roegner | 35,503 | 57.10% |
| 2018 | Casey Weinstein | 28,567 | 50.60% | Mike Rasor | 27,860 | 49.40% |
| 2020 | Casey Weinstein | 36,789 | 51.40% | Beth Bigham | 34,776 | 48.60% |

Ohio House 34th district
| Year | Democrat | Votes | Pct | Republican | Votes | Pct |
|---|---|---|---|---|---|---|
| 2022 | Casey Weinstein | 27,735 | 53.80% | Beth Bigham | 23,813 | 46.20% |

Ohio Senate 28th district
| Year | Democrat | Votes | Pct | Republican | Votes | Pct |
|---|---|---|---|---|---|---|
| 2024 | Casey Weinstein | 88,575 | 55.90% | John Leissler | 69,977 | 44.10% |
