= Ohio's 28th senatorial district =

American legislative district

Ohio's 28th State Senate district
Senator
Casey Weinstein; D–Hudson
- Demographics: 69.7% White; 20.6% Black; 2.6% Hispanic; 4.7% Asian; 2.1% Native American; 0.1% Hawaiian/Pacific Islander
- Population (2020) • Voting age • Citizens of voting age: 355,425; 280,936; 275,180

Ohio's 28th senatorial district has historically been based in Summit County and is limited to metro Akron. It encompasses Ohio House districts 34, 35 and 36. It has a Cook PVI of D+5.

The current Ohio Senator is Democrat Casey Weinstein.

== List of senators ==
Senator	Party	Term	Notes
William B. Nye	Democrat	January 3, 1967 – January 7, 1971	Nye resigned in 1971 to take a seat under Governor John Gilligan.
John Poda	Democrat	January 13, 1971 – December 31, 1972	Poda did not seek re-election in 1972.
David Headley	Democrat	January 3, 1973 – December 31, 1976	Headley did not seek re-election in 1976.
Kenneth Cox	Democrat	January 3, 1977 – December 31, 1982	Cox was redistricted out of his district in 1982 and did not seek re-election.
Marcus Roberto	Democrat	January 3, 1983 – December 17, 1986	Roberto was redistricted to the 28th District in 1982. He died in 1986 while in office.
Bob Nettle	Democrat	January 2, 1987 – March 31, 1995	Nettle resigned in 1995 prior to the expiration of his term.
Leigh Herington	Democrat	March 31, 1995 – August 31, 2003	Herington resigned in 2003 to run for Portage County Court of Common Pleas.
Kimberly Zurz	Democrat	September 3, 2003 – January 28, 2007	Zurz resigned in 2007 to work under Governor Ted Strickland.
Tom Sawyer	Democrat	February 20, 2007 – December 31, 2016	Sawyer was term-limited in 2016.
Vernon Sykes	Democrat	January 3, 2017 – January 3, 2025	Sykes was term-limited in 2024
Casey Weinstein	Democrat	January 3, 2025 – present	Incumbent
