= Brian Lampton =

American politician

Member of the Ohio House of Representatives from the 70th district
- Incumbent
- Assumed office January 3, 2023
- Preceded by: Darrell Kick

Member of the Ohio House of Representatives from the 73rd district
- In office January 4, 2021 – December 31, 2022
- Preceded by: Rick Perales
- Succeeded by: Jeff LaRe

Personal details
- Party: Republican

Brian E. Lampton is an American politician who is currently the Ohio state representative in Ohio's 70th district after being redistricted from the 73rd district. He won the seat after incumbent Republican Rick Perales became term–limited after completing his fourth term in office. He defeated Democrat Kim McCarthy in 2020, winning 57.5% to 42.6%. Lampton currently serves as the chair of the Insurance Committee.
