= Jeff LaRe =

American politician (born 1976)

Member of the Ohio House of Representatives from the 73rd district
- Incumbent
- Assumed office January 3, 2023
- Preceded by: Brian Lampton

Member of the Ohio House of Representatives from the 77th district
- In office May 22, 2019 – December 31, 2022
- Preceded by: Tim Schaffer
- Succeeded by: Scott Wiggam

Personal details
- Born: February 9, 1976 (age 50) Columbus, Ohio, U.S.
- Party: Republican

Jeffrey LaRe (/ləˈreɪ/; born February 9, 1976) is an American politician and law enforcement officer serving as a member of the Ohio House of Representatives from the 73rd district. A Republican, LaRe's district includes the northern half of Fairfield County.

== Career ==
LaRe is a trained peace officer and works for a national security and asset protection service company along with his public service.

In 2019, state Representative Tim Schaffer was appointed to the Ohio Senate, creating a vacancy for his seat. LaRe was appointed by Ohio House Republicans to serve the remainder of Schaffer's term. He was sworn into office on May 22, 2019.

=== 2021 congressional special election ===
Shortly after incumbent representative Steve Stivers announced his resignation from Congress to become president and CEO of the Ohio Chamber of Commerce, LaRe declared his candidacy for the special election to succeed him. LaRe lost the Republican primary to former coal lobbyist, Mike Carey, who received the endorsement of Donald Trump.
