= Reggie Stoltzfus =

American politician (born 1980)

Member of the Ohio House of Representatives from the 50th district
- In office January 7, 2019 – December 31, 2024
- Preceded by: Christina Hagan
- Succeeded by: Matthew Kishman

Personal details
- Born: September 15, 1980 (age 45) Hartville, Ohio, U.S.
- Party: Republican
- Education: Malone University

Reginald Lynn Stoltzfus (born September 15, 1980) is an American politician who served in the Ohio House of Representatives from the 50th district from 2019 to 2024. Prior to his election to the legislature, he was a member of the Paris City Council.
