= Dick Stein =

American politician

Member of the Ohio House of Representatives from the 54th district
- In office January 3, 2017 – December 31, 2024
- Preceded by: Terry Boose
- Succeeded by: Kellie Deeter

Personal details
- Party: Republican
- Spouse: Patty Stein

Richard Stein is an American politician who served in the Ohio House of Representatives from 2017 to 2024. He represents the 54th district. He is a Republican. The district consists of Huron County as well as Rochester, Wellington, LaGrange, Eaton Estates, Avon and portions of North Ridgeville in Lorain County.

== FirstEnergy scandal ==
Rep. Dick Stein supported House Bill 6 (HB 6), which prosecutors linked to the $60 million FirstEnergy bribery scandal. See Ohio nuclear bribery scandal.

Stein’s campaign received $2,500 from the FirstEnergy political action committee in 2018.

=== Vote on the Expulsion of Larry Householder ===
During the 134th Ohio General Assembly, Dick Stein voted against the expulsion of former House Speaker Larry Householder, who had been federally indicted and later convicted in connection with the Ohio nuclear bribery scandal tied to House Bill 6. The Ohio House voted 75–21 to expel Householder, with Dick Stein among the 21 Republican members who opposed the resolution.

== Life and career ==
Stein was born and raised in Norwalk, Ohio, where he still resides today. A business owner, Stein has owned Stein Photography for nearly forty years. He is a graduate of Norwalk St. Paul High School, and also holds various photography licenses.

Prior to running for office, Stein was a longtime member of the Huron County Republican Party Central Committee. Stein and his wife, Patty, has two children and five grandchildren.

== Ohio House of Representatives ==
In 2016, state Representative Terry Boose was unable to run for another term due to term-limits. A competitive seat on paper, both Democrats and Republicans made the seat a top target. On the Republican side, Stein was one of four to seek the GOP nomination, besting Kathryn Frombaugh and two others with 34% of the vote to take the nomination.

Facing Democrat Tom Dunlap, a Huron County Commissioner, Stein won the general election 62% to 38%. He was sworn in on January 3, 2017.

Political offices
Preceded by Terry Boose	Ohio House of Representatives, 57th District; 2017–present	Incumbent
