= Kent Smith (American politician) =

American politician (born 1966)

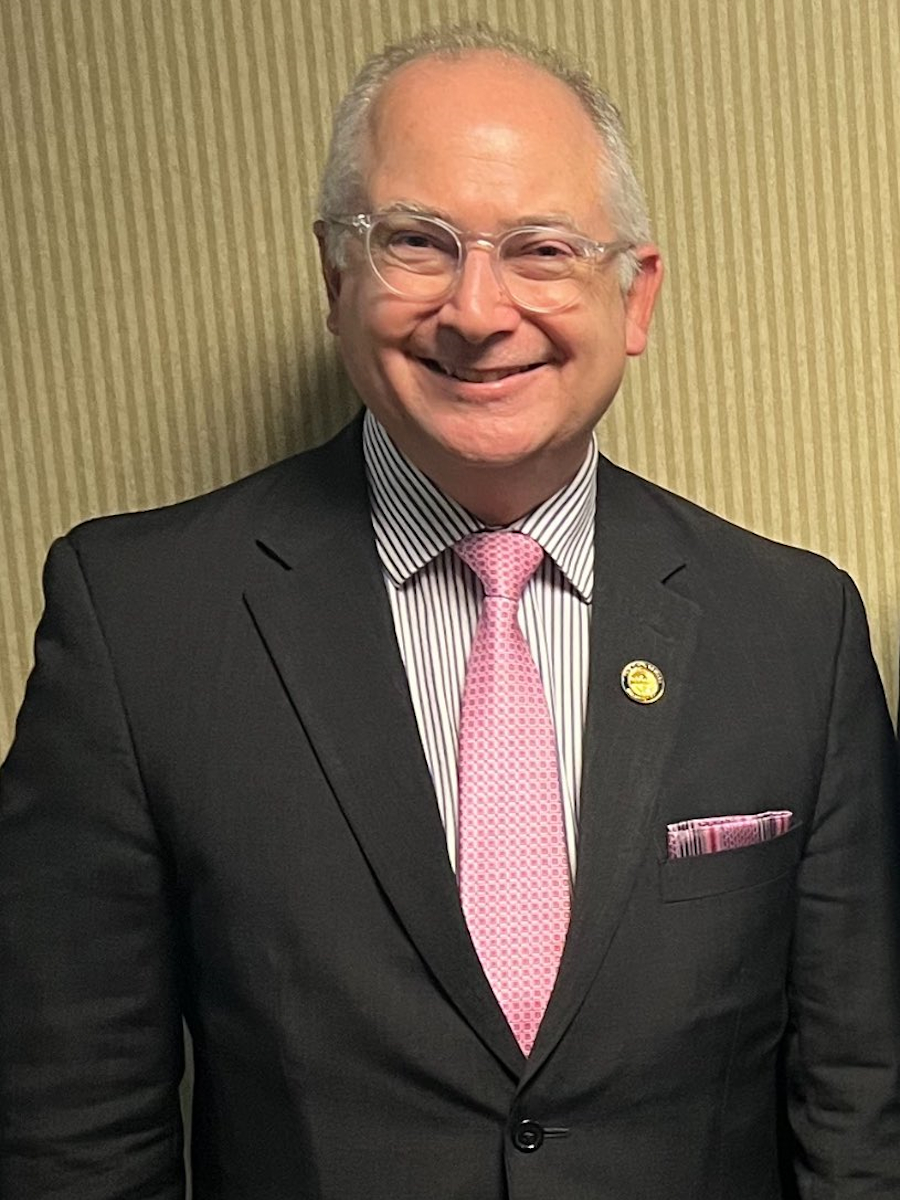
- Smith in 2023

Member of the Ohio Senate from the 21st district
- Incumbent
- Assumed office January 3, 2023
- Preceded by: Dale Martin

Member of the Ohio House of Representatives from the 8th district
- In office January 3, 2015 – December 31, 2022
- Preceded by: Armond Budish
- Succeeded by: Elliot Forhan

Personal details
- Born: September 4, 1966 (age 60)
- Party: Democratic
- Education: Miami University; Cleveland State University (M.S.)

Kent Smith (born September 4, 1966) is the senator of the 21st district of the Ohio Senate. He is a resident of Euclid, Ohio, and previously served as a representative in the Ohio House of Representatives from 2015 to 2022, and was on the Euclid School Board for 12 years. He also served as head of the Democratic Party for Euclid, and has a degree from the Maxine Goodman Levin College of Urban Affairs at Cleveland State University. In 2014, Smith opted to run for the Ohio House of Representatives to replace Armond Budish, who was term-limited and sought election instead as Cuyahoga County executive. He faced Republican Mikhail Alterman and Independent Jocelyn Conwell, and won with 71.47% of the vote. Smith was re-elected in 2016 and 2018.
