= Brett Hillyer =

American politician (born 1986)

Brett Hudson Hillyer

Member of the Ohio House of Representatives from the 51st district
- Incumbent
- Assumed office January 3, 2023
- Preceded by: Sara Carruthers

Member of the Ohio House of Representatives from the 98th district
- In office January 7, 2019 – December 31, 2022
- Preceded by: Al Landis
- Succeeded by: Darrell Kick

Personal details
- Born: April 16, 1986 (age 40) Canton, Ohio
- Party: Republican
- Spouse: Anna Hillyer
- Education: University of Akron, Ohio Northern University

Brett Hudson Hillyer (born April 16, 1986) is an American politician from Ohio. Hillyer is a Republican Party member of the Ohio House of Representatives, representing the 51st district since 2019. Hillyer's district includes all of Tuscarawas County and half of Holmes County.

== FirstEnergy scandal ==
Rep. Brett Hudson Hillyer supported House Bill 6 (HB 6), the 2019 energy law later tied to what prosecutors described as the largest corruption scandal in Ohio history. The $60 million bribery and racketeering scheme, centered on former House Speaker Larry Householder, was funded by FirstEnergy Corporation. See Ohio nuclear bribery scandal.

=== Association with Team Householder ===
During the 2018 Ohio House election cycle, Brett Hillyer was identified in reporting as one of the Republican candidates recruited by then-State Representative Larry Householder as part of an organized effort to regain the speakership of the Ohio House of Representatives. According to an investigation by Cleveland.com, Householder assembled a slate of candidates, commonly referred to as “Team Householder,” who were encouraged to run for office with the expectation that they would support his bid for Speaker if elected. Hillyer was listed among the candidates recruited as part of this strategy.

The successful election of multiple Team Householder candidates enabled Householder to secure enough internal support to be elected Speaker at the start of the 133rd Ohio General Assembly.

According to campaign finance records, Hillyer received $1,500 from the FirstEnergy political action committee in 2018.

=== Vote on the Expulsion of Larry Householder ===
During the 134th Ohio General Assembly, Brett Hillyer voted against the expulsion of former House Speaker Larry Householder, who had been federally indicted and later convicted in connection with the Ohio nuclear bribery scandal tied to House Bill 6. The Ohio House voted 75–21 to expel Householder, with Brett Hillyer among the 21 Republican members who opposed the resolution.

== Career ==
Hillyer previously served as the city prosecutor and law director for Uhrichsville, Ohio. He is a graduate of the University of Akron and Ohio Northern University. As a city prosecutor, Hillyer was influential in setting up Land banking in his area.

In 2018, state Representatives Al Landis was unable to run for another term due to term limits, leaving the seat vacant. In a crowded Republican primary, Hillyer won the Republican nomination over four other candidates. In November 2018, Hillyer won the election and became a Republican Party member of the Ohio House of Representatives, representing the 98th district.

== Personal life ==
Hillyer's wife is Anna Hillyer. Hillyer and his family live in Uhrichsville, Ohio.
