= Kirk Schuring =

American politician (1952–2024)

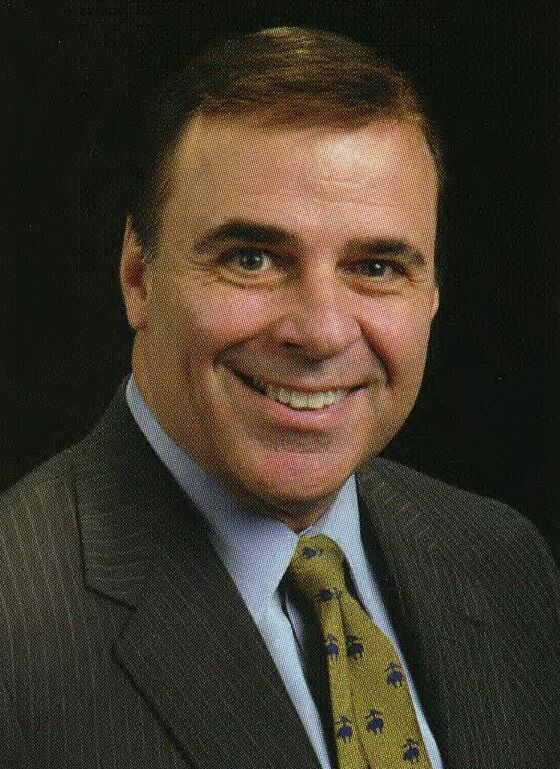
- Schuring in 2006

President pro tempore of the Ohio Senate
- In office January 3, 2023 – November 22, 2024
- Preceded by: Jay Hottinger
- Succeeded by: Bill Reineke

Majority Leader of the Ohio Senate
- In office January 4, 2021 – January 3, 2023
- Preceded by: Matt Huffman
- Succeeded by: Rob McColley

Member of the Ohio Senate from the 29th district
- In office January 3, 2019 – November 22, 2024
- Preceded by: Scott Oelslager
- Succeeded by: Jane Timken
- In office January 6, 2003 – December 31, 2010
- Preceded by: Scott Oelslager
- Succeeded by: Scott Oelslager

Acting Speaker of the Ohio House of Representatives
- In office April 12, 2018 – June 6, 2018
- Preceded by: Cliff Rosenberger
- Succeeded by: Ryan Smith

Speaker pro tempore of the Ohio House of Representatives
- In office January 3, 2017 – December 31, 2018
- Preceded by: Ron Amstutz
- Succeeded by: Jim Butler

Member of the Ohio House of Representatives from the 48th district
- In office January 3, 2011 – December 31, 2018
- Preceded by: Scott Oelslager
- Succeeded by: Scott Oelslager
- In office January 3, 1995 – December 31, 2002
- Preceded by: David Johnson
- Succeeded by: Scott Oelslager

Personal details
- Born: September 17, 1952 Canton, Ohio, U.S.
- Died: November 22, 2024 (aged 72) Canton, Ohio, U.S.
- Party: Republican
- Spouse: Darlene
- Education: Kent State University

James Kirk Schuring (September 17, 1952 – November 22, 2024) was an American politician of the Republican Party from the state of Ohio. He was a member of the Ohio House of Representatives from 1993 to 2002, and from 2011 to 2018. Schuring also served in the Ohio Senate from 2003 to 2010, before returning in 2018 and serving there until his death.

In 2018, Schuring was interim Speaker of the Ohio House of Representatives, following the resignation of Speaker Cliff Rosenberger. Rosenberger resigned amid revelations he was under investigation by the Federal Bureau of Investigation. He was also the Republican nominee for Ohio's 16th congressional district in 2008.

== Career ==
Schuring joined his family's insurance agency in Plain Township, Stark County, Ohio, in 1978, and took it over after his father's death two years later. He was president of the Canton Jaycees, the Young Republicans, and the Canton Urban League. He also served as Chairman of the Stark/Wayne Christmas Seal Drive and the Chamber's Vision 1 Committee.

=== Ohio House of Representatives (1993–2002) ===
In 1993, Schuring was appointed to an open seat in the Ohio House of Representatives vacated by Representative David Johnson. He was elected to his full first term in 1994, and re-elected in 1996, 1998 and 2000, before being term limited in 2002.

=== Ohio Senate (2003–2010) ===
With both Schuring and Senator Scott Oelslager term limited from their respective positions in 2002, they swapped seats. Schuring won against Democrat Jan Schwartz with 55.6% of the vote in the general election. In the 126th General Assembly, Schuring served as Reference Committee Chairman.

In 2006, he defeated Democrat Thomas West again with 55% of the vote. He again served as Reference Committee Chairman for the 127th General Assembly.

=== 2008 congressional campaign ===
When Congressman Ralph Regula announced in late-2007 that he would not seek another term in Congress, Schuring won the Republican nomination to succeed him. His opponent was fellow state Senator John Boccieri, who had been elected to the Senate in 2006. While historically a Republican district, Boccieri won with 55.36% of the vote.

=== Ohio House of Representatives (2011–2019) ===
Schuring again faced term limits in 2010 in the Senate, and Oelslager too could not run for another term. As a result, they again ran for each other's seats. The maneuver again proved successful, with Schuring defeating Democrat Andrew Haines with 69.2% of the vote in the general election.

Schuring was sworn in to begin his second tenure in the House on January 3, 2011. In 2012, Schuring won reelection with 57.34% over Democrat Amanda Trump.

== Political positions ==
Schuring worked to develop a pension reform plan that doesn't involve hikes to employer contribution to public retirement systems. There's a "sentiment of caution" among many lawmakers in terms of pension reform. He said many lawmakers are "justifiably sensitive to the plight of local governments." He had been critical to finding a solution in providing a cost efficient and solvent solution to the public pension systems.

The only Republican to vote against the measure, Schuring joined Democrats in voting against a measure to require a photo ID when casting a ballot in Ohio. Many had criticized Republicans for pushing the measure through the legislature.

== Abortion legislation ==
In 2019, Schuring co-sponsored Ohio Senate Bill 23, often referred to as the "Heartbeat Bill." The law bans most abortions after the detection of a fetal heartbeat, typically around six weeks into pregnancy. It includes no exceptions for rape or incest. Governor Mike DeWine signed the bill into law on April 11, 2019.

Schuring’s support of SB 23 aligned with his long-standing record of backing anti-abortion legislation in the Ohio General Assembly. The bill attracted national attention and was swiftly challenged in court.

In September 2022, a Hamilton County judge temporarily blocked the enforcement of the law, restoring legal abortion access in Ohio up to 22 weeks of pregnancy while ongoing litigation proceeded.

== Personal life and death ==
Schuring married Darlene Newkirk in 1975, and they had two children. He died from pancreatic cancer at his home on November 22, 2024, at the age of 72.

== See also ==
- United States House of Representatives elections in Ohio, 2008

Ohio House of Representatives
Preceded by Ron Amstutz	Speaker pro tempore of the Ohio House of Representatives; 2017–2019	Succeeded by Jim Butler
Political offices
Preceded by Cliff Rosenberger	Speaker of the Ohio House of Representatives; Acting; 2018	Succeeded by Ryan Smith
Ohio Senate
Preceded by Matt Huffman	Majority Leader of the Ohio Senate; 2021–2023	Succeeded by Rob McColley
Preceded by Bob Peterson	President pro tempore of the Ohio Senate; 2023–2024	Succeeded by Bill Reineke
