= Rob McColley =

American politician (born 1984)

97th President of the Ohio Senate
- Incumbent
- Assumed office January 6, 2025
- Preceded by: Matt Huffman

Majority Leader of the Ohio Senate
- In office January 3, 2023 – January 6, 2025
- Preceded by: Kirk Schuring
- Succeeded by: Theresa Gavarone

Member of the Ohio Senate from the 1st district
- Incumbent
- Assumed office December 5, 2017
- Preceded by: Cliff Hite

Member of the Ohio House of Representatives from the 81st district
- In office January 6, 2015 – December 5, 2017
- Preceded by: Lynn Wachtmann
- Succeeded by: Jim Hoops

Personal details
- Born: October 14, 1984 (age 42)
- Party: Republican
- Spouse: Denise McColley (m. 2013)
- Children: 3
- Education: Ohio State University (BS); University of Toledo (JD)

Robert A. McColley (born October 14, 1984) is an American politician who serves as the state senator for the 1st District of the Ohio Senate, which includes Defiance, Hancock, Hardin, Henry, Paulding, Putnam, Van Wert, and Williams counties in addition to parts of Auglaize, Fulton, and Logan counties.

Before being appointed to the Senate, he represented the 81st Ohio House District as a state representative, where he also served in House leadership as assistant majority whip. Before being elected to the House, he served on the Community Improvement Corporation of Henry County, overseeing economic development and working to improve local workforce development between manufacturers and schools in Henry and Williams counties.

McColley was Vivek Ramaswamy's running mate in the 2026 Ohio gubernatorial election, losing to the Democratic ticket of Amy Acton and David Pepper.

== Education ==
McColley graduated from Napoleon High School in Napoleon in 2003 and attended Ohio State University in Columbus, where he earned a Bachelor of Science in Business Administration with an emphasis in finance. He graduated with a Juris Doctor degree from the University of Toledo College of Law in 2010.

== Ohio legislature (2015-present) ==
=== Energy ===
In 2019, McColley was one of the few Republican members of the Ohio Senate to oppose House Bill 6 (HB 6), a controversial piece of legislation designed to provide a $150 million annual subsidy to two nuclear power plants in Ohio operated by FirstEnergy Solutions.

McColley’s opposition was rooted primarily in free-market principles and a fiscal conservative stance against government-mandated subsidies. He argued that the legislation picked "winners and losers" in the energy sector rather than allowing the market to dictate the viability of power generation sources. An August 2021 investigation by the Ohio Capital Journal reported that energy-industry political action committees and utility-aligned donors continued contributing to Ohio lawmakers while the federal investigation into House Bill 6 remained ongoing, including to McColley's campaign.

In April 2025, Cleveland.com reported that Ohio lawmakers who opposed or limited solar and renewable energy expansion had collectively received substantial financial backing from utility and fossil-fuel interests. The report focused on energy legislation moving through the Ohio Senate and identified Senate leadership as central to advancing policies that critics said aligned with donor interests opposed to expanded solar development. At the time, McColley served in Senate leadership and was involved in advancing the chamber’s energy agenda. During the 2025 legislative session, McColley played a leading role in advancing a sweeping energy policy overhaul through the Ohio Senate. Reporting by the Ohio Capital Journal noted that the proposal was supported by traditional energy interests and utility stakeholders, while clean-energy advocates criticized the measure as favoring incumbent energy providers over renewable development.

The final energy package was approved by the General Assembly and sent to the governor in May 2025. According to the Ohio Capital Journal, the legislation repealed certain provisions associated with House Bill 6 while leaving other utility-favored policy structures intact, sustaining debate over the continuing influence of energy-sector interests on Ohio’s energy policy framework.

In 2021, McColley was the lead sponsor on legislation that would allow county commissioners to block new wind or solar power projects that lie in all or part of an unincorporated area of the county. The proposal did not give county commissioners similar powers to block natural gas or oil projects.

=== Abortion ===
In 2019, McColley co-sponsored Ohio Senate Bill 23, commonly referred to as the "Heartbeat Bill." This legislation bans abortions once a fetal heartbeat is detectable, typically around six weeks into pregnancy. The bill includes no exceptions for rape or incest. It was signed into law by Governor Mike DeWine on April 11, 2019. The bill was effectively overturned in a constitutional amendment adopted by voters in a ballot initiative in 2023.

=== Covid-19 ===
In May 2020, during the COVID-19 pandemic, McColley and Senator Kristina Roegner introduced a bill, which would immediately end Ohio's stay-at-home order and limit the state health director's ability to give similar orders. The bill was contrary to the recommendation of the country's top medical experts; Governor DeWine has promised to veto any bill that curb's the health director's authority during the crisis.

=== Redistricting ===
In 2021, McColley defended a proposed redistricting map for Ohio which some critics including the League of Women Voters of Ohio, criticized as being gerrymandered in favor of Republicans.

=== Committee assignments ===
During the 134th General Assembly, McColley was assigned to the following committees:

- Energy and Public Utilities Committee (Chair)
- Judiciary Committee (Vice Chair)
- Government Oversight and Reform Committee (Vice Chair)
- Workforce and Higher Education Committee
- Rules and Reference Committee

== Personal life ==
McColley lives in Napoleon with his wife, Denise, their daughter Anna, and their twin boys Matthew and Michael.

Ohio Senate
| Preceded by Kirk Schuring | Majority Leader of the Ohio Senate; 2023–2025 | Succeeded by Theresa Gavarone |
| Preceded by Matt Huffman | President of the Ohio Senate; 2025–present | Incumbent |
Party political offices
| Preceded by Jon Husted | Republican nominee for Lieutenant Governor of Ohio; 2026 | Most recent |
