= Nickie Antonio =

American politician (born 1955)

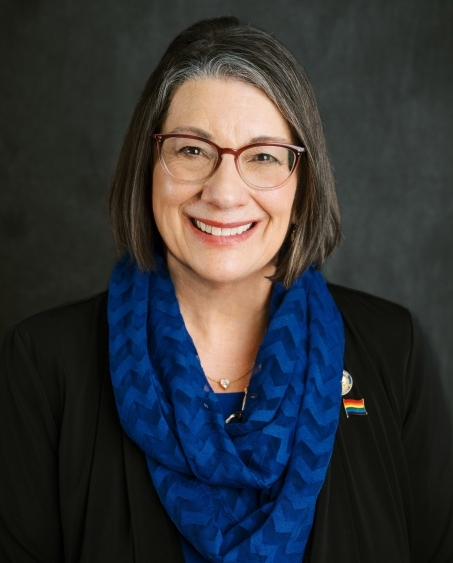

Minority Leader of the Ohio Senate
- Incumbent
- Assumed office January 3, 2023
- Preceded by: Kenny Yuko

Member of the Ohio Senate from the 23rd district
- Incumbent
- Assumed office January 7, 2019
- Preceded by: Mike Skindell

Member of the Ohio House of Representatives from the 13th district
- In office January 3, 2011 – December 31, 2018
- Preceded by: Mike Skindell
- Succeeded by: Mike Skindell

Personal details
- Born: June 2, 1955 (age 71)
- Party: Democratic
- Spouse: Jean Kosmac
- Education: Cleveland State University (BS, MPA)
- Website: Campaign website

Nickie J. Antonio (born June 2, 1955) is an American politician from Ohio. A Democrat, she serves in the Ohio Senate representing the 23rd district in the western portion of Cuyahoga County including the western third of Cleveland and some of the nearby western suburbs. She previously served in the Ohio House of Representatives representing the 13th district from 2011 to 2018. A former member of Lakewood City Council, Antonio was elected to the lower chamber of the legislature in 2010 and took office on January 3, 2011, and was re-elected in the 2012 General election, receiving 75% of the vote. She was re-elected consecutively in the General elections of 2014 and 2016. After being term limited in the lower chamber of the legislature, Antonio was elected to the upper chamber of the legislature in 2018 and took office on January 7, 2019. She is the minority leader and the first openly gay member of the legislature. She was a special education teacher and worked for a non-profit before running for political office.

== Early life and career ==
Antonio attended Lutheran High School West and is an alumna of Cleveland State University, where she earned both a Bachelor of Science degree in Education and a Master of Public Administration from the Maxine Goodman Levin College of Urban Affairs. In 2011, Antonio completed Harvard University's John F. Kennedy School of Government program for Senior Executives in State and Local Government as a David Bohnett LGBTQ Victory Institute Leadership Fellow. She is a former special education teacher, adjunct professor and non-profit administrator, as well as a former chair of the Cuyahoga Democratic Women's Caucus.

Antonio was first elected to Lakewood City Council in 2005, winning an at-large seat. She was re-elected in 2009, receiving the most votes in a field of six candidates chasing three seats.

== Ohio House of Representatives ==
Antonio won in the Democratic primary against fellow Lakewood councilmember Tom Bullock. In the primary election held on May 4, 2010, Antonio defeated Bullock by 54% to 46% - a margin of 609 votes. No Republican filed for the seat in the heavily Democratic district so Antonio won the general election unopposed.

She took her seat in the House on January 3, 2011. In the 129th General Assembly, she served on five committees: Finance and Appropriations, HHS Finance Subcommittee, Commerce, Labor and Technology, Education (as Ranking Member), and Health and Aging. She also serves on the Unified Long-Term Care Advisory Workgroup, the 21st Century Manufacturing Task Force and the Community Health Futures Task Force.

Antonio won a landslide victory reelection to a second term in 2012, by obtaining 75,86% of the vote over Republican John Zappalla. She would go on to be re-elected two more times.

== Policies and initiatives ==
In one of her first legislative priorities along with Ted Celeste, Antonio introduced legislation to eliminate the death penalty in the state of Ohio. Celeste has pointed to evidence that the penalty has been discriminatory toward minorities.

Antonio is a staunch opponent of S.B. 5, which looks to eliminate many aspects of collective bargaining. When asked if she would work to amend the bill, she stated it is beyond repair.

Along with Mike Foley, Antonio introduced a Works Progress Administration-style provision that would allow for $200 million to be appropriated to allow for the creation of 5,000 entry-level jobs across Ohio. Antonio calls it a jobs plan that would help to stimulate the economy.

A supporter of abortion rights, Antonio has fought against numerous initiatives to restrict abortion rights since becoming a state representative.

== Personal ==
Antonio is the first openly gay person to have served in the Ohio General Assembly, and a long-time advocate of same-sex marriage rights. After a 21 year engagement, she was finally able to marry Jean Kosmac in 2013. The couple have two daughters.

Ohio Senate
Preceded by Joe Schiavoni	Minority Leader of the Ohio Senate; 2023–present	Incumbent
