= Hearcel Craig =

American politician (born 1949)

Hearcel F. Craig
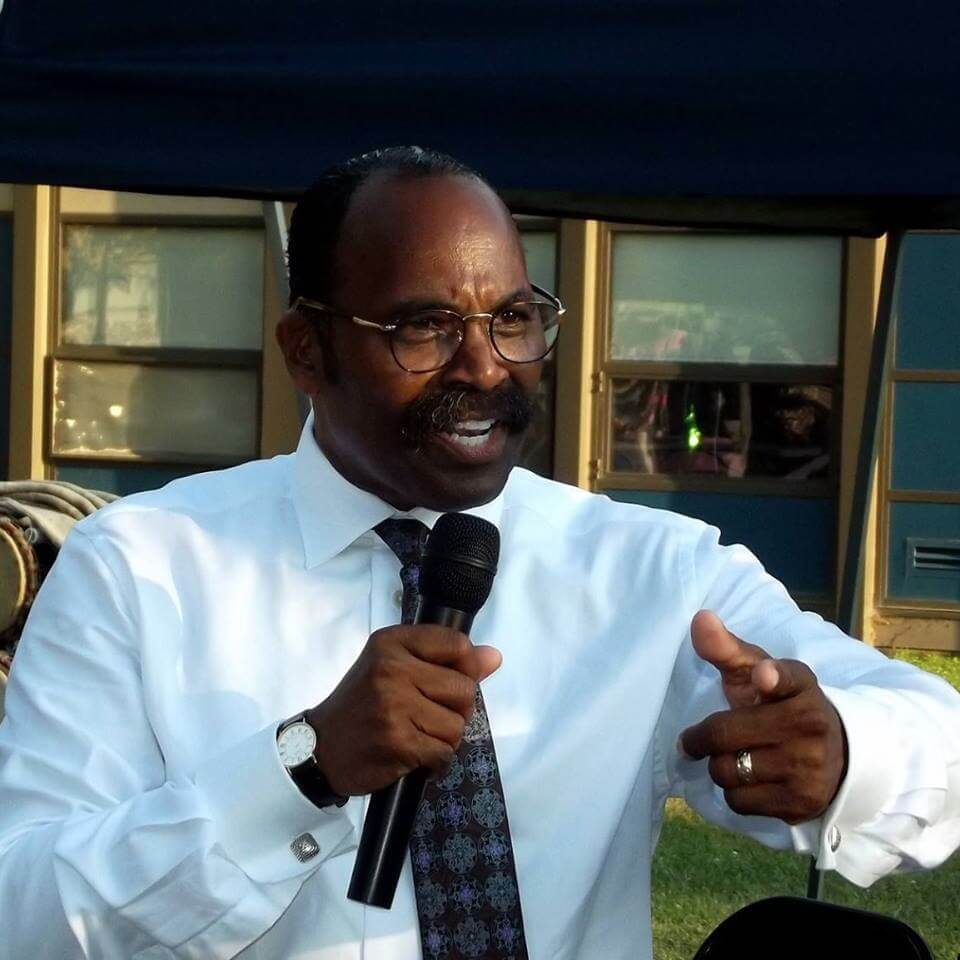

Member of the Ohio Senate from the 15th district
- Incumbent
- Assumed office January 6, 2019
- Preceded by: Charleta Tavares

Member of the Ohio House of Representatives from the 26th district
- In office January 6, 2015 – December 31, 2018
- Preceded by: Tracy Maxwell Heard
- Succeeded by: Erica Crawley

Columbus City Councilmember
- In office April 16, 2007 – December 31, 2014
- Preceded by: Patsy Thomas
- Succeeded by: Jaiza Page

Personal details
- Born: July 1, 1949 (age 77) U.S.
- Party: Democratic
- Spouse: Linda Craig
- Children: 4
- Education: Central Michigan University (MS)
- Website: https://craig4ohio.com/

Military service
- Allegiance: United States
- Branch/service: United States Army
- Years of service: 1970 - 1972
- Unit: United States Army

Hearcel F. Craig (born July 1, 1949) is an American politician serving as the Senator for the 15th District of the Ohio State Senate. Craig formerly served in the United States Army and then had a career with the Ohio Department of Youth Services. He then went on to help develop City Year in Columbus. He has a degree from Central Michigan University. In 2007, Craig was appointed to serve on Columbus City Council. While on Council, Craig rose to serve as President Pro Tempore.

In 2014, Craig decided to run for the Ohio House of Representatives to replace Tracy Maxwell Heard, who was term limited. He won the primary over Heard's husband, Howard Heard. He went on to defeat Republican Dustin Pyles 76%-24%. He was elected to a 2nd term in the Ohio House of Representatives in 2016. In 2018, Craig decided to seek the nomination for Ohio's 15th State Senate District. The incumbent, Charleta Tavares, was term limited and unable to seek re-election. Craig won both the primary and general elections, and took office on January 6, 2019.

== Ohio State Senate ==
In 2018, instead of seeking re-election, Craig decided to seek the nomination for Ohio's 15th State Senate District. The incumbent Senator, Charleta Tavares, was term-limited and unable to seek re-election. Craig won both primary and general elections, and took office on January 6, 2019.

In 2021, Craig was elected as Assistant Minority Whip for the Ohio Senate Democratic Caucus.

=== Committee assignments ===
- Committee on Government Oversight & Reform (Ranking Member)
- Insurance (Ranking Member)
- Energy & Public Utilities
- Finance
- Financial Institutions & Technology

== Electoral history ==
Election results
Year	Office	Election	Votes for Craig	%	Opponent	Party	Votes	%
2007	Columbus City Council	General	49,753 (4th)*	14.61				
2011	Columbus City Council	General	74,156 (4th)*	14.37				
2014	Ohio House of Representatives	Primary	4,430	60.44	Howard Heard	Democratic	2,899	39.56
2014	Ohio House of Representatives	General	19,505	75.79	Dustin Pyles	Republican	6,230	24.21
2016	Ohio House of Representatives	General	40,268	79.61	Kenneth H. Collins	Republican	10,314	20.39
2018	Ohio State Senate	Primary	20,440	69.77	Jodi Howell	Democratic	8,857	30.23
2018	Ohio State Senate	General	107,505	82.52	Jordan Garcea	Republican	22,778	17.48

* Top four are elected to Columbus City Council
