= Scott Oelslager =

American politician (born 1953)

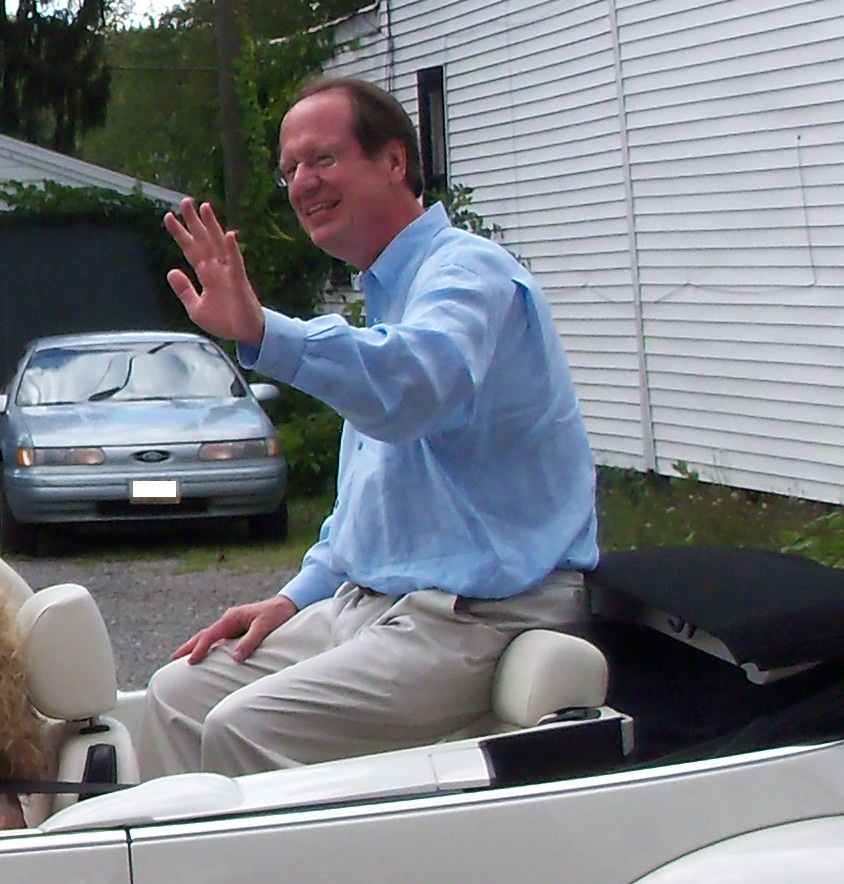

Speaker pro tempore of the Ohio House of Representatives
- In office January 3, 2023 – January 6, 2025
- Preceded by: Tim Ginter
- Succeeded by: Gayle Manning

Member of the Ohio House of Representatives from the 48th district
- Incumbent
- Assumed office January 3, 2019
- Preceded by: Kirk Schuring
- In office January 3, 2003 – December 31, 2010
- Preceded by: Kirk Schuring
- Succeeded by: Kirk Schuring

Member of the Ohio Senate from the 29th district
- In office January 3, 2011 – December 31, 2018
- Preceded by: Kirk Schuring
- Succeeded by: Kirk Schuring
- In office February 5, 1985 – December 31, 2002
- Preceded by: Tom Walsh
- Succeeded by: Kirk Schuring

Personal details
- Born: October 15, 1953 (age 72) Warren, Pennsylvania, U.S.
- Party: Republican
- Spouse: Elsie
- Education: University of Mount Union (BA); Capital University (JD)

Scott Oelslager (born October 15, 1953) is an American politician who has served in the Ohio House of Representatives since 2019. He represents the 48th district. He previously held the same seat from 2003 to 2010 and also served in the Ohio Senate from 1985 to 2002 and again from 2011 to 2018. He is a Republican.

== Life and career ==
A graduate of Mount Union College, Oelslager formerly worked as an aide for his predecessor, Tom Walsh. When Walsh resigned his seat, Oelslager was first appointed to replace him in 1985, and was re-elected in 1986 with 52% of the vote. Following that election, Oelslager was elected three more times.

In 2002, Oeslager faced term-limits and instead he was elected to the Ohio House of Representatives for the 51st district, and was re-elected in 2004, 2006 and 2008. Oelslager was unopposed in 2004 and 2008. He again was term-limited out of the House in 2010.

== Return to the Ohio Senate ==
In 2010, Oelslager decided to run for his old seat in the Ohio Senate, swapping seats with Kirk Schuring, who preceded Oelslager in the House. Oelslager defeated his opponent, Richard Reinbold, with 59% of the vote. In his return to the Senate, Oelslager served as chairman of the Health & Human Services Committee for the 129th Ohio General Assembly.

For the 130th Ohio General Assembly, Oelslager was named chairman of the Senate Finance Committee, the committee tasked with amending the Governor's budget. He was re-elected easily in 2014, attaining 66% of the vote over Democrat Connie Rubin.

Term limited again in 2018, Oelslager again switched seats with Schuring, again winning a seat in the Ohio House of Representatives. He was sworn in for his fifth term in the house on January 3, 2019.

=== Committee assignments ===
As of June 2026, Oelslager serves on the following committees in the Ohio House.

- Financial Institutions (chair)
- General Government
- Judiciary
- Medicaid

== Electoral history ==
Election results
Year	Office		%		%
1986	Ohio Senate	Scott Oelslager	51.90%	Jim Gwin	48.10%
1990	Ohio Senate	Scott Oelslager	62.10%	Patricia Nolan	38.90%
1994	Ohio Senate	Scott Oelslager	71.27%	Maria Kalorides	28.73%
1998	Ohio Senate	Scott Oelslager	69.94%	Doug Dalo	30.06%
2002	Ohio House of Representatives	Scott Oelslager	69.93%	Marilyn Scott	30.07%
2004	Ohio House of Representatives	Scott Oelslager	100%	Unopposed	
2006	Ohio House of Representatives	Scott Oelslager	62.85%	Kody Gonzales	37.15%
2008	Ohio House of Representatives	Scott Oelslager	100%	Unopposed	
2010	Ohio Senate	Scott Oelslager	59.25%	Richard Reinbold	40.75%
2014	Ohio Senate	Scott Oelslager	66.69%	Connie Rubin	33.31%
2018	Ohio House of Representatives	Scott Oelslager	64.04%	Lorraine Wilburn	35.97%

Ohio House of Representatives
Preceded by Tim Ginter	Speaker pro tempore of the Ohio House of Representatives; 2023–2025	Succeeded by Gayle Manning
