= Jason Stephens (politician) =

American politician (born 1971)

106th Speaker of the Ohio House of Representatives
- In office January 3, 2023 – January 6, 2025
- Preceded by: Robert R. Cupp
- Succeeded by: Matt Huffman

Member of the Ohio House of Representatives from the 93rd district
- Incumbent
- Assumed office October 10, 2019
- Preceded by: Ryan Smith

Personal details
- Born: 1971 (age 54–55)
- Party: Republican
- Education: Lipscomb University (BS)

Jason C. Stephens is an American Republican politician who became the speaker of the Ohio House of Representatives on January 3, 2023. He has been the representative for the 93rd district since October 10, 2019, taking the seat after Ryan Smith left the House to become president of the University of Rio Grande.

== Vote on the expulsion of Larry Householder ==
During the 134th Ohio General Assembly, Jason Stephens voted against the expulsion of former House Speaker Larry Householder, who had been federally indicted and later convicted in connection with the Ohio nuclear bribery scandal tied to House Bill 6. The Ohio House voted 75–21 to expel Householder, with Jason Stephens among the 21 Republican members who opposed the resolution.

== House Bill 6 repeal efforts ==
In 2023, reporting by the Ohio Capital Journal examined actions taken by Ohio House leadership under Speaker Jason Stephens in relation to efforts to repeal House Bill 6, the energy law at the center of Ohio’s nuclear bribery scandal. According to the report, legislation introduced to fully repeal House Bill 6 did not advance in the Ohio House during Stephens’ speakership, amid continued public attention to the law and its association with the FirstEnergy bribery case.

The article reported that House leadership exercised procedural control over whether repeal legislation received committee hearings or floor votes, preventing full repeal measures from moving forward. As described by the Ohio Capital Journal, these actions resulted in key provisions of House Bill 6 remaining in effect years after federal prosecutors characterized the law as having been secured through a widespread bribery scheme involving utility interests and state officials.

This reporting occurred amid the broader Ohio nuclear bribery scandal, which centered on House Bill 6 and related dark-money activity.

== Political career ==
Stephens's election to Speaker of the Ohio House of Representatives was an unexpected result, as he defeated far right Derek Merrin. Stephens was able to secure election to the Speakership by receiving the votes of all of the Democratic caucus along with a third of the Republicans, even though he had previously lost an internal GOP caucus vote for leader. Democratic Leader Allison Russo noted that the selection of Stephens did not come with a "grand deal" but that the Stephens would work with her caucus on items ranging from education policy to redistricting.

In 2023, Stephens voted for legislation to ban gender-affirming medical care for minors and ban transgender athletes from competing in women's sports. The legislation was vetoed by Ohio Governor Mike DeWine, a Republican, who argued that medical care should be left to families and their doctors, not be dictated by the government.

=== Committee assignments ===
As of June 2026, Stephens serves on the following committees in the Ohio House.

- Financial Institutions
- Government Oversight
- Local Government
- Medicaid

Political offices
Preceded by Robert R. Cupp	Speaker of the Ohio House of Representatives; 2023–2025	Succeeded by Matt Huffman
