= Shane Wilkin =

American politician (born 1970)

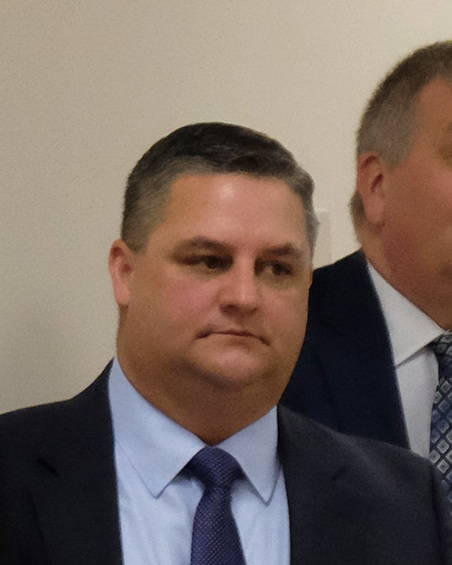

Member of the Ohio Senate from the 17th district
- Incumbent
- Assumed office January 3, 2023
- Preceded by: Bob Peterson

Member of the Ohio House of Representatives from the 91st district
- In office June 7, 2018 – December 31, 2022
- Preceded by: Cliff Rosenberger
- Succeeded by: Bob Peterson

Personal details
- Born: August 8, 1970 (age 55) Lynchburg, Ohio, U.S.
- Party: Republican

Shane Wilkin (born August 8, 1970) is an American politician serving as a member of the Ohio State Senate. He previously served as a member of the Ohio House of Representatives, representing the 91st district from 2018 to 2023. A Republican, Wilkin's house district included all of Clinton, Highland and Pike counties and portions of Ross county. Prior to serving in the state House, Wilkin served three terms as a Highland County Commissioner. Professionally, he works as a realtor.

In 2018, Wilkin entered the primary to succeed Speaker of the Ohio House of Representatives Cliff Rosenberger, but unexpectedly was appointed to Rosenberger's seat after the Speaker resigned following a campaign finance scandal. Wilkin was appointed after winning the Republican primary for the seat, defeating Rosenberger's preferred candidate, Beth Ann Ellis. He easily won the general election.

== Vote on expulsion of Larry Householder ==
During the 134th Ohio General Assembly, Shane Wilkin voted against the expulsion of former Ohio House Speaker Larry Householder. At the time of the vote, Householder had been federally indicted in connection with the Ohio nuclear bribery scandal, which centered on the passage of House Bill 6. The Ohio House of Representatives voted 75–21 to expel Householder, with Shane Wilkin among the 21 Republican members who opposed the resolution.

== Links ==
- Representative Shane Wilkin (official site)
