= Bob Peterson (Ohio politician) =

American politician (born 1962)

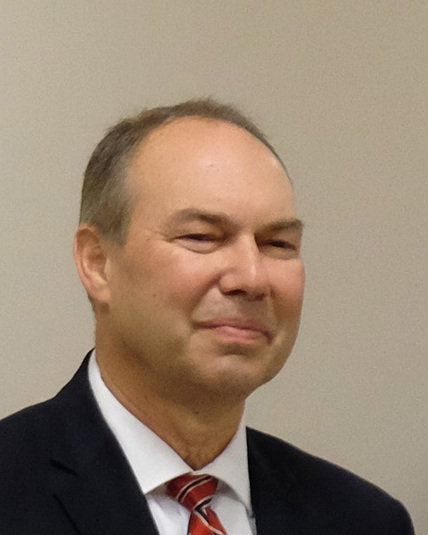

Member of the Ohio House of Representatives from the 91st district
- Incumbent
- Assumed office January 1, 2023
- Preceded by: Shane Wilkin

Member of the Ohio Senate from the 17th district
- In office March 21, 2012 – December 31, 2022
- Preceded by: David T. Daniels
- Succeeded by: Shane Wilkin

Member of the Ohio House of Representatives from the 85th district
- In office January 3, 2011 – March 21, 2012
- Preceded by: Raymond Pryor
- Succeeded by: Gary Scherer

Personal details
- Born: March 15, 1962 (age 64) Washington Court House, Ohio, U.S.
- Party: Republican
- Spouse: Lisa Peterson
- Children: 3
- Education: Ohio State University (BS)

Bob Peterson (born March 15, 1962) is an American politician who served as a Republican member of the Ohio Senate from the 17th District, where served as President Pro Tempore. From 2011 to 2012, he served as a member of the Ohio House of Representatives, representing the 85th district. Before being elected to the Ohio House of Representatives, he was Fayette County Commissioner for 14 years. He was first elected as a state representative in November 2010.

Peterson was elected to a full-term to the Ohio Senate on November 6, 2012 and was sworn-in January, 2013.

== Education and early career ==
Peterson graduated from Ohio State University, receiving his bachelor's degree in Agriculture, with a focus in Animal Science and Agriculture Economics. He served as a Fayette County Farm Bureau President from 1990-1992 and was elected to the Ohio Farm Bureau in 1995. Peterson served as a Fayette County Commissioner for fourteen years before being elected to the Ohio House of Representatives in 2011.

== Political career ==
After being elected to the Ohio House, Peterson applied to fill the vacant seat for the Ohio Senate seat representing the 17th district in 2012.

While a member of the Ohio Senate, Peterson has served as the chairman of many committees, including: the General Government Subcommittee of Finance, Ways and Means Committee, Capitol Square Review and Advisory Board, the Joint Commission on Agency Rule Review and has served as a member of the Ohio Controlling Board.

As of 2018, Peterson served as vice chair of the Senate Rules and Reference Committee and as a member of the Ways and Means Committee, Agriculture Committee, Government Oversight and Reform Committee, Local Government, Public Safety and Veterans Affairs Committee, and Finance General Government Subcommittee.

Peterson has been awarded for his efforts in the Ohio Statehouse, including the Watchdog of the Treasury Award from the United Conservatives, the Council of Smaller Enterprises’ Small Business Advocate Award, the Ohio Farm Bureau Friend of Agriculture, the NFIB’s Guardian of Small Business Award, Legislator of the Year from the County Engineers Association of Ohio, and the Nature Conservancy’s commitment to improving Ohio's water quality award.

== Abortion legislation ==
In 2019, Peterson co-sponsored Ohio Senate Bill 23, also known as the "Heartbeat Bill." The legislation bans abortions once a fetal heartbeat can be detected, typically around six weeks into pregnancy. It includes no exceptions for rape or incest and was signed into law by Governor Mike DeWine on April 11, 2019.

Peterson’s co-sponsorship of SB 23 aligned with efforts by Ohio Republican lawmakers to limit access to abortion in the state. The bill generated national headlines and faced immediate legal opposition.

In September 2022, a judge in Hamilton County temporarily blocked the law's enforcement, restoring abortion access in Ohio up to 22 weeks of pregnancy pending ongoing litigation.

Ohio Senate
Preceded by Chris Widener	President pro tempore of the Ohio Senate; 2016–2021	Succeeded by Jay Hottinger
