= 2024 Ohio House of Representatives election =

- November 5, 2024

All 99 seats in the Ohio House of Representatives 50 seats needed for a majority

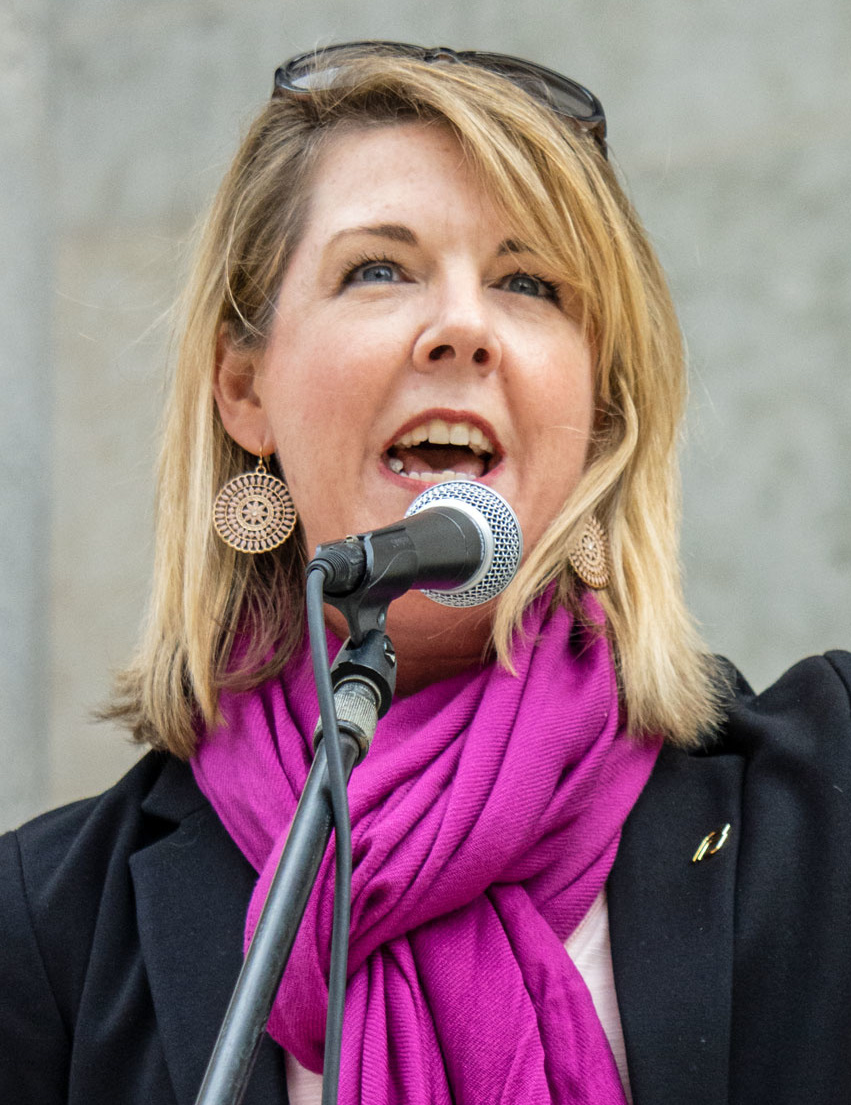
	Majority party	Minority party
Leader	Jason Stephens (stepped down)	Allison Russo
Party	Republican	Democratic
Leader's seat	93rd district	7th district
Last election	67 seats, 67.7%	32 seats, 32.3%
Seats before	67	32
Seats after	65	34
Seat change	▼2	▲2
Popular vote	3,010,168	2,290,035
Percentage	56.46%	42.95%
Swing	▼2.36%	▲3.03%
- Democratic gain Republican hold Democratic hold 50–60% 60–70% 70–80% 80–90% >90% 50–60% 60–70% 70–80% 80–90% >90%
Speaker before election
Jason Stephens
Republican
Elected Speaker
Matt Huffman
Republican

The 2024 Ohio House of Representatives election was held on November 5, 2024, to elect representatives in all 99 districts of the Ohio House of Representatives. Members were elected in single-member constituencies to two-year terms. These elections were held concurrently with various federal and state elections, including for U.S. president, U.S. Senate, and the Ohio Senate.

This election was held under different districts than the 2022 Ohio House of Representatives election because in September 2023, the Ohio Redistricting Commission approved a new set of maps for both chambers of the Ohio General Assembly. Unlike the five previous district maps adopted by the redistricting commission, the newest map was upheld by the Ohio Supreme Court in November 2023, allowing it to go into effect from the 2024 election through the 2030 election.

== Partisan background ==
In the 2020 presidential election, Trump won 64 Ohio House districts, while Biden won 35. As the 2024 election neared, Republicans held six districts where Biden won, including areas around Columbus, Akron, Toledo, Canton, and Mahoning County. Meanwhile, Democrats represented three districts where Trump won, including parts of Northeast Cuyahoga, suburban Lucas County, and Mahoning County.

Biden 40–50% 50–60% 60–70% 70–80% 80–90% / Trump 40–50% 50–60% 60–70% 70–80% 80–90%

== Predictions ==
Source	Ranking	As of
CNalysis	Solid R	February 29, 2024

== Overview ==
Party	Candidates	Votes		Seats		
Party	Candidates	No.	%	Before	After	+/–
Republican	90	3,010,168	56.4619	67	65	▼2
Democratic	93	2,290,035	42.9540	32	34	▲2
Libertarian	2	16,256	0.3049	0	0	0
Independent	1	12,120	0.2273	0	0	0
write-in	7	239	0.0044	0	0	0
Total valid votes		5,331,326	100.00	99	99	
registered voters/turnout		8,159,946	71.71			

=== Closest races ===
Seats where the margin of victory was under 10%:

1. District 10, 3.00%
2. District 11, 3.68%
3. District 36, 4.74%
4. District 49, 4.78%
5. District 35, 5.10%
6. District 23, 5.76%
7. District 31, 5.96%
8. District 34, 6.36%
9. District 60, 8.50%
10. District 15, 9.10%
11. District 17, 9.14%

== Outgoing incumbents ==
=== Retirements ===
==== Republicans ====
- District 10: David Dobos retired.
- District 50: Reggie Stoltzfus retired to run for Ohio's 6th congressional district.
- District 65: Mike Loychik retired to run for Ohio's 32nd senatorial district.
- District 78: Susan Manchester retired to run for Ohio's 12th senatorial district.
- District 80: Jena Powell retired.

==== Democrats ====
- District 8: Beth Liston retired to run for Ohio's 16th senatorial district.
- District 13: Michael J. Skindell retired.
- District 15: Richard Dell'Aquila retired to run for Cuyahoga County Council.
- District 28: Jodi Whitted retired.
- District 34: Casey Weinstein retired to run for Ohio's 28th senatorial district.
- District 38: Willis Blackshear Jr. retired to run for Ohio's 6th senatorial district.

=== Term-limited ===
==== Republicans ====
- District 17: Tom Patton was term-limited.
- District 30: Bill Seitz was term-limited.
- District 42: Derek Merrin was term-limited.
- District 54: Dick Stein was term-limited.
- District 55: Scott Lipps was term-limited.
- District 71: Bill Dean was term-limited.
- District 77: Scott Wiggam was term-limited.
- District 94: Jay Edwards was term-limited.
- District 98: Darrell Kick was term-limited.

==== Democrats ====
- District 5: Richard Brown was term-limited.
- District 6: Adam Miller was term-limited.

=== Lost re-nomination ===
==== Republicans ====
- District 47: Sara Carruthers lost re-nomination.
- District 51: Brett Hillyer lost re-nomination.
- District 72: Gail Pavliga lost re-nomination.
- District 83: Jon Cross lost re-nomination.

==== Democrats ====
- District 21: Elliot Forhan lost re-nomination.

== Summary of results by district ==
Italics denote an open seat held by the incumbent party; bold text denotes a gain for a party.

State House district	Incumbent	Party	Elected representative	Outcome
1	Dontavius Jarrells	Dem	Dontavius Jarrells	Dem hold
2	Latyna Humphrey	Dem	Latyna Humphrey	Dem hold
3	Ismail Mohamed	Dem	Ismail Mohamed	Dem hold
4	Beryl Piccolantonio	Dem	Beryl Piccolantonio	Dem hold
5	Richard Brown	Dem	Meredith Lawson-Rowe	Dem hold
6	Adam Miller	Dem	Christine Cockley	Dem hold
7	Allison Russo	Dem	Allison Russo	Dem hold
8	Beth Liston	Dem	Anita Somani (Note: Representative Anita Somani was elected in District 11 in 2022; however, she ran for re-election in District 8 in 2024.)	Dem hold
9	Munira Abdullahi	Dem	Munira Abdullahi	Dem hold
10	David Dobos	Rep	**Mark Sigrist**	**Dem gain**
11	Anita Somani	Dem	Crystal Lett	Dem hold
12	Brian Stewart	Rep	Brian Stewart	Rep hold
13	Michael J. Skindell	Dem	Tristan Rader	Dem hold
14	Sean Brennan	Dem	Sean Brennan	Dem hold
15	Richard Dell'Aquila	Dem	Chris Glassburn	Dem hold
16	Bride Rose Sweeney	Dem	Bride Rose Sweeney	Dem hold
17	Tom Patton	Rep	Mike Dovilla	Rep hold
18	Darnell Brewer (Note: Representative Darnell Brewer was elected in District 18 in 2022; however, he ran for re-election in District 22 in 2024.)	Dem	Juanita Brent (Note: Representative Juanita Brent was elected in District 22 in 2022; however, she ran for re-election in District 18 in 2024.)	Dem hold
19	Phil Robinson	Dem	Phil Robinson	Dem hold
20	Terrence Upchurch	Dem	Terrence Upchurch	Dem hold
21	Elliot Forhan	Dem	Eric Synenberg	Dem hold
22	Juanita Brent	Dem	Darnell Brewer	Dem hold
23	Dan Troy	Dem	Dan Troy	Dem hold
24	Dani Isaacsohn	Dem	Dani Isaacsohn	Dem hold
25	Cecil Thomas	Dem	Cecil Thomas	Dem hold
26	Sedrick Denson	Dem	Sedrick Denson	Dem hold
27	Rachel Baker	Dem	Rachel Baker	Dem hold
28	Jodi Whitted	Dem	Karen Brownlee	Dem hold
29	Cindy Abrams	Rep	Cindy Abrams	Rep hold
30	Bill Seitz	Rep	Mike Odioso	Rep hold
31	Bill Roemer	Rep	Bill Roemer	Rep hold
32	Jack K. Daniels	Rep	Jack K. Daniels	Rep hold
33	Veronica Sims	Dem	Veronica Sims	Dem hold
34	Casey Weinstein	Dem	Derrick Hall	Dem hold
35	Steve Demetriou	Rep	Steve Demetriou	Rep hold
36	Andrea White	Rep	Andrea White	Rep hold
37	Tom Young	Rep	Tom Young	Rep hold
38	Willis Blackshear Jr.	Dem	Desiree Tims	Dem hold
39	Phil Plummer	Rep	Phil Plummer	Rep hold
40	Rodney Creech	Rep	Rodney Creech	Rep hold
41	Josh Williams (Note: Representative Josh Williams was elected in District 41 in 2022; however, he ran for re-election in District 44 in 2024.)	Rep	**Erika White**	**Dem gain**
42	Derek Merrin	Rep	**Elgin Rogers Jr.** (Note: Representative Elgin Rogers Jr. was elected in District 44 in 2022; however, he ran for re-election in District 42 in 2024.)	**Dem gain**
43	Michele Grim	Dem	Michele Grim	Dem hold
44	Elgin Rogers Jr.	Dem	**Josh Williams**	**Rep gain**
45	Jennifer Gross	Rep	Jennifer Gross	Rep hold
46	Thomas Hall	Rep	Thomas Hall	Rep hold
47	Sara Carruthers	Rep	Diane Mullins	Rep hold
48	Scott Oelslager	Rep	Scott Oelslager	Rep hold
49	Jim Thomas	Rep	Jim Thomas	Rep hold
50	Reggie Stoltzfus	Rep	Matthew Kishman	Rep hold
51	Brett Hillyer	Rep	Jodi Salvo	Rep hold
52	Gayle L. Manning	Rep	Gayle L. Manning	Rep hold
53	Joseph A. "Joe" Miller III	Dem	Joseph A. "Joe" Miller III	Dem hold
54	Dick Stein	Rep	Kellie Deeter	Rep hold
55	Scott Lipps	Rep	Michelle Teska	Rep hold
56	Adam Mathews	Rep	Adam Mathews	Rep hold
57	Jamie Callender	Rep	Jamie Callender	Rep hold
58	Tex Fischer (Note: Representative Tex Fischer was appointed in June 2024 to represent District 58; however, he ran for re-election in District 59 in the November 2024 general election.)	Rep	**Lauren McNally** (Note: Representative Lauren McNally was elected in District 59 in 2022; however, she ran for re-election in District 58 in 2024.)	**Dem gain**
59	Lauren McNally	Dem	**Tex Fischer**	**Rep gain**
60	Brian Lorenz	Rep	Brian Lorenz	Rep hold
61	Beth Lear	Rep	Beth Lear	Rep hold
62	Jean Schmidt	Rep	Jean Schmidt	Rep hold
63	Adam Bird	Rep	Adam Bird	Rep hold
64	Nick Santucci	Rep	Nick Santucci	Rep hold
65	Mike Loychik	Rep	David Thomas	Rep hold
66	Sharon Ray	Rep	Sharon Ray	Rep hold
67	Melanie Miller	Rep	Melanie Miller	Rep hold
68	Thaddeus Claggett	Rep	Thaddeus Claggett	Rep hold
69	Kevin Miller	Rep	Kevin Miller	Rep hold
70	Brian Lampton	Rep	Brian Lampton	Rep hold
71	Bill Dean	Rep	Levi Dean	Rep hold
72	Gail Pavliga	Rep	Heidi Workman	Rep hold
73	Jeff LaRe	Rep	Jeff LaRe	Rep hold
74	Bernard Willis	Rep	Bernard Willis	Rep hold
75	Haraz Ghanbari	Rep	Haraz Ghanbari	Rep hold
76	Marilyn John	Rep	Marilyn John	Rep hold
77	Scott Wiggam	Rep	Meredith Craig	Rep hold
78	Susan Manchester	Rep	Matt Huffman	Rep hold
79	Monica Robb Blasdel	Rep	Monica Robb Blasdel	Rep hold
80	Jena Powell	Rep	Johnathan Newman	Rep hold
81	James "Jim" Hoops	Rep	James "Jim" Hoops	Rep hold
82	Roy Klopfenstein	Rep	Roy Klopfenstein	Rep hold
83	Jon Cross	Rep	Ty Mathews	Rep hold
84	Angela King	Rep	Angela King	Rep hold
85	Tim Barhorst	Rep	Tim Barhorst	Rep hold
86	Tracy Richardson	Rep	Tracy Richardson	Rep hold
87	Riordan McClain	Rep	Riordan McClain	Rep hold
88	Gary Click	Rep	Gary Click	Rep hold
89	D. J. Swearingen	Rep	D. J. Swearingen	Rep hold
90	Justin Pizzulli	Rep	Justin Pizzulli	Rep hold
91	Bob Peterson	Rep	Bob Peterson	Rep hold
92	Mark Johnson	Rep	Mark Johnson	Rep hold
93	Jason Stephens	Rep	Jason Stephens	Rep hold
94	Jay Edwards	Rep	Kevin Ritter	Rep hold
95	Don Jones	Rep	Don Jones	Rep hold
96	Ron Ferguson	Rep	Ron Ferguson	Rep hold
97	Adam Holmes	Rep	Adam Holmes	Rep hold
98	Darrell Kick	Rep	Mark Hiner	Rep hold
99	Sarah Fowler	Rep	Sarah Fowler	Rep hold

== District 1 ==
=== Democratic primary ===
==== Declared ====
- Dontavius Jarrells, incumbent state representative

==== Results ====
Democratic primary results
Party	Candidate	Votes	%
Democratic	Dontavius Jarrells (incumbent)	6,573	100.0
Total votes		6,573	100.0

=== Libertarian ===
==== Failed to qualify ====
- Brennan Barrington

=== General election ===
==== Results ====
General election results
Party	Candidate	Votes	%
Democratic	Dontavius Jarrells (incumbent)	35,739	100.0
Total votes		35,739	100.0

== District 2 ==
=== Democratic primary ===
==== Declared ====
- Latyna Humphrey, incumbent state representative

==== Results ====
Democratic primary results
Party	Candidate	Votes	%
Democratic	Latyna Humphrey (incumbent)	6,020	100.0
Total votes		6,020	100.0

=== General election ===
==== Results ====
General election results
Party	Candidate	Votes	%
Democratic	Latyna Humphrey (incumbent)	32,142	85.2
Libertarian	Eric Terford	5,605	14.9
Total votes		37,747	100

== District 3 ==
=== Democratic primary ===
==== Declared ====
- Abdirizak Diini, community activist and small business owner
- Ismail Mohamed, incumbent state representative
- Julie Trabold, nurse

==== Results ====
Democratic primary results
Party	Candidate	Votes	%
Democratic	Ismail Mohamed (incumbent)	4,897	55.2
Democratic	Abdirizak Diini	2,918	32.9
Democratic	Julie Trabold	1,058	11.9
Total votes		8,873	100.0

=== General election ===
==== Results ====
General election results
Party	Candidate	Votes	%
Democratic	Ismail Mohamed	28,838	100.0
Total votes		28,838	100.0

==== Endorsements ====
Ismail Mohamed

Organizations

- Franklin County Democratic Party

== District 4 ==
=== Democratic primary ===
==== Declared ====
- Beryl Brown Piccolantonio, incumbent state representative

==== Results ====
Democratic primary results
Party	Candidate	Votes	%
Democratic	Beryl Brown Piccolantonio (incumbent)	6,176	100.0
Total votes		6,176	100.0

=== Republican primary ===
==== Declared ====
- Jason Allevato

==== Results ====
Republican primary results
Party	Candidate	Votes	%
Republican	Jason Allevato	5,520	100.0
Total votes		5,520	100.0

=== General election ===
==== Results ====
General election results
Party	Candidate	Votes	%
Democratic	Beryl Brown Piccolantonio (incumbent)	38,733	57.4%
Republican	Jason Allevato	28,758	42.6%
Total votes		67,491	100%

== District 5 ==
=== Democratic primary ===
==== Declared ====
- Leo Almeida
- Meredith Lawson-Rowe
- Marco Miller

==== Endorsements ====
Declined to endorse

Organizations

- Franklin County Democratic Party

==== Results ====
Democratic primary results
Party	Candidate	Votes	%
Democratic	Meredith Lawson-Rowe	2,744	52.25
Democratic	Marco Miller	1,600	30.46
Democratic	Leo Almeida	908	17.29
Total votes		5,253	100.0

=== General election ===
General election results
Party	Candidate	Votes	%
Democratic	Meredith Lawson-Rowe	32,395	100.0%
Total votes		32,395	100%

== District 6 ==
=== Democratic primary ===
==== Declared ====
- Brandon Barcus
- Patrick Barnacle
- Eli Bohnert, West Scioto commissioner
- Christine Cockley, human resources specialist
- Adhanet Kifle
- Kawther Musa, community health worker and community activist
- Elijah Williams

==== Endorsements ====
Declined to endorse

Organizations

- Franklin County Democratic Party

==== Results ====
Democratic primary results
Party	Candidate	Votes	%
Democratic	Christine Cockley	1,541	31.51
Democratic	Brandon Barcus	885	18.09
Democratic	Eli Bohnert	740	15.13
Democratic	Kawther Musa	690	14.11
Democratic	Adhanet Kifle	552	11.29
Democratic	Elijah Williams	250	5.11
Democratic	Patrick Barnacle	233	4.76
Total votes		4,891	100.0

=== Republican primary ===
==== Declared ====
- Hussein Jabiri

==== Results ====
Republican primary results
Party	Candidate	Votes	%
Republican	Hussein Jabiri	2,203	100.0
Total votes		2,203	100.0

=== General election ===
==== Results ====
General election results
Party	Candidate	Votes	%
Democratic	Christine Cockley	23,315	60.3
Republican	Hussein Jabiri	15,363	39.7
Total votes		38,678	100.0

== District 7 ==
=== Democratic primary ===
==== Declared ====
- Allison Russo, incumbent state representative

==== Results ====
Democratic primary results
Party	Candidate	Votes	%
Democratic	Allison Russo (incumbent)	7,493	100.0
Total votes		7,493	100.0

=== Independents ===
- Susan Miller (write-in)

=== General election ===
General election results
Party	Candidate	Votes	%
Democratic	Allison Russo (incumbent)	44,243	99.9
Independent	Susan Miller (write-in)	50	0.1
Total votes		44,293	100.0

== District 8 ==
=== Democratic primary ===
==== Declared ====
- Anita Somani, incumbent state representative (redistricted from the 11th district)

==== Declined ====
- Beth Liston, incumbent state representative (running for Ohio Senate)

==== Results ====
Democratic primary results
Party	Candidate	Votes	%
Democratic	Anita Somani (incumbent)	6,218	100.0
Total votes		6,218	100.0

=== Republican primary ===
==== Declared ====
- Aaron Neumann (write-in)

==== Results ====
Republican primary results
Party	Candidate	Votes	%
Republican	Aaron Neumann	245	100.0
Total votes		245	100.0

=== General election ===
==== Results ====
General election results
Party	Candidate	Votes	%
Democratic	Anita Somani (incumbent)	36,054	64.5
Republican	Aaron Neumann	19,829	35.5
Total votes		55,883	100.0

== District 9 ==
=== Democratic primary ===
==== Declared ====
- Munira Abdullahi, incumbent state representative

==== Results ====
Democratic primary results
Party	Candidate	Votes	%
Democratic	Munira Abdullahi (incumbent)	4,919	100.0
Total votes		4,919	100.0

=== General election ===
==== Results ====
General election results
Party	Candidate	Votes	%
Democratic	Munira Abdullahi (incumbent)	28,020	72.5
Libertarian	Brandy Seymour	10,651	27.5
Total votes		38,671	100.0

== District 10 ==
=== Republican primary ===
==== Declared ====
- Brian M. Garvine
- Shafi Shafat

==== Withdrawn ====
- David Dobos, incumbent state representative

==== Results ====
Republican primary results
Party	Candidate	Votes	%
Republican	Brian M. Garvine	3,218	83.56
Republican	Shafi Shafat	633	16.44
Total votes		3,851	100.0

=== Democratic primary ===
==== Declared ====
- Sarah C. Pomeroy
- Mark Sigrist

==== Endorsements ====
Declined to endorse

Organizations

- Franklin County Democratic Party

==== Results ====
Democratic primary results
Party	Candidate	Votes	%
Democratic	Mark Sigrist	2,329	50.22
Democratic	Sarah C. Pomeroy	2,309	49.78
Total votes		4,638	100.0

=== General election ===
==== Results ====
General election results
Party	Candidate	Votes	%
Democratic	Mark Sigrist	26,752	51.5
Republican	Brian M. Garvine	25,175	48.5
Total votes		51,927	100.0

== District 11 ==
=== Democratic primary ===
==== Declared ====
- Crystal Lett, political activist

==== Results ====
Democratic primary results
Party	Candidate	Votes	%
Democratic	Crystal Lett	5,469	100.0
Total votes		5,469	100.0

=== Republican primary ===
==== Declared ====
- Stephanie Kunze, state senator from the 16th district (2017–present)

==== Results ====
Republican primary results
Party	Candidate	Votes	%
Republican	Stephanie Kunze	6,642	100.0
Total votes		6,642	100.0

=== General election ===
==== Results ====
General election results
Party	Candidate	Votes	%
Democratic	Crystal Lett	33,327	51.8
Republican	Stephanie Kunze	30,965	48.2
Total votes		64,292	100.0

== District 12 ==
=== Republican primary ===
==== Declared ====
- Patty Hamilton, retired lieutenant colonel in the U.S. Army Reserves
- Brian Stewart, incumbent state representative

==== Endorsements ====
Brian Stewart

Organizations

- Americans for Prosperity
- National Federation of Independent Business
- Ohio Right to Life

==== Results ====
Republican primary results
Party	Candidate	Votes	%
Republican	Brian Stewart (incumbent)	9,540	57.2
Republican	Patty Hamilton	7,143	42.8
Total votes		16,683	100.0

=== Democratic primary ===
==== Declared ====
- Brad W. Cotton

==== Results ====
Democratic primary results
Party	Candidate	Votes	%
Democratic	Brad W. Cotton	2,945	100.0
Total votes		2,945	100.0

=== General election ===
==== Results ====
General election results
Party	Candidate	Votes	%
Democratic	Brad W. Cotton	14,894	27.1
Republican	Brian Stewart (incumbent)	40,109	72.9
Total votes		55,003	100.0

== District 13 ==
=== Democratic primary ===
==== Declared ====
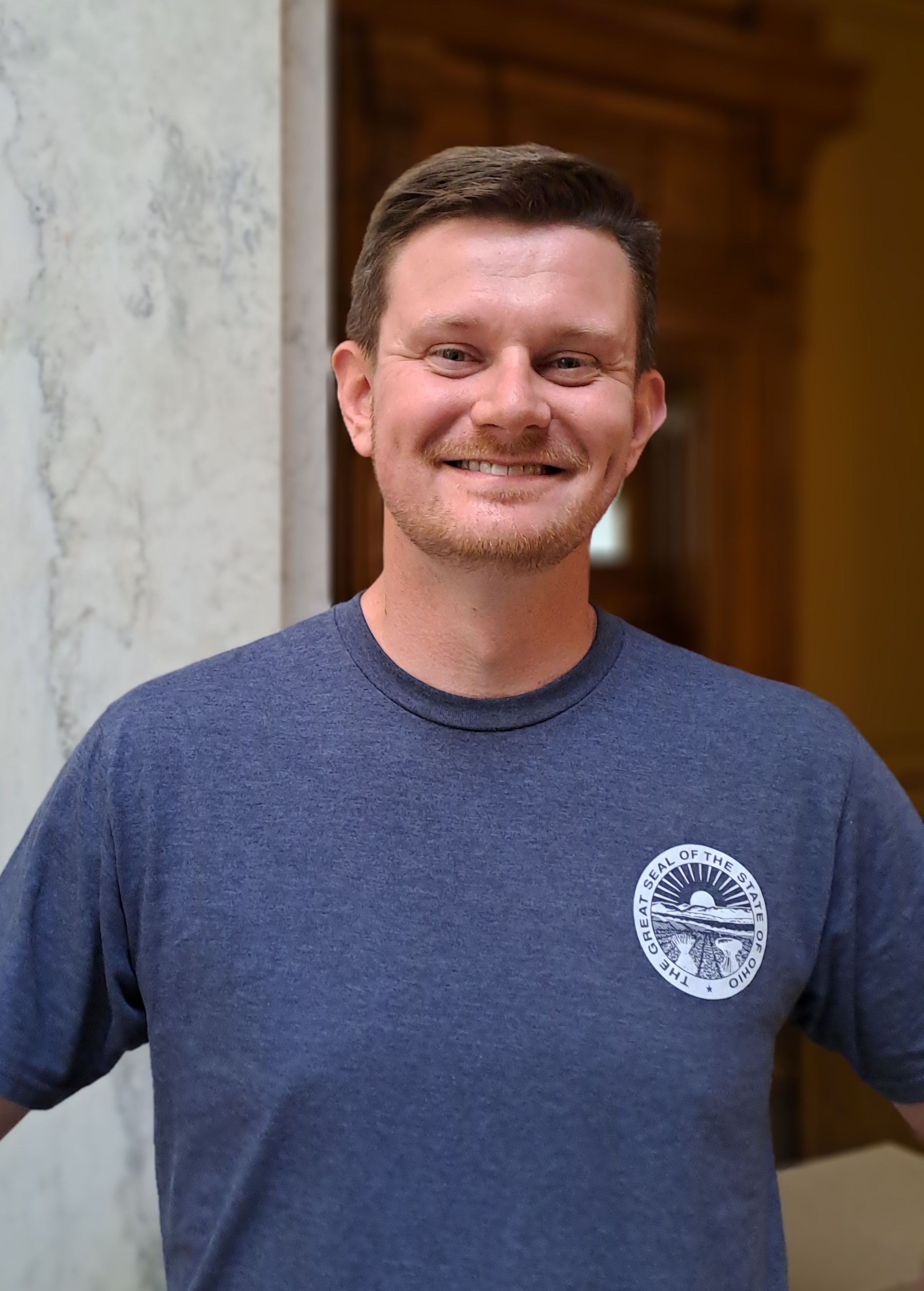
Tristan W. Rader

- Tristan W. Rader, Lakewood city councilor and candidate for Ohio's 7th congressional district in 2022

==== Withdrawn ====
- Michael J. Skindell, incumbent state representative

==== Results ====
Democratic primary results
Party	Candidate	Votes	%
Democratic	Tristan W. Rader	6,701	100.0
Total votes		6,701	100.0

=== Republican primary ===
==== Declared ====
- Robert E. Dintaman

==== Results ====
Republican primary results
Party	Candidate	Votes	%
Republican	Robert E. Dintaman	1,544	100.0
Total votes		1,544	100.0

=== General election ===
==== Results ====
General election results
Party	Candidate	Votes	%
Democratic	Tristan W. Rader	34,532	76.5
Republican	Robert E. Dintaman	10,625	23.5
Total votes		45,157	100.0

== District 14 ==
=== Democratic primary ===
==== Declared ====
- Sean Brennan, incumbent state representative

==== Results ====
Democratic primary results
Party	Candidate	Votes	%
Democratic	Sean Brennan (incumbent)	5,796	100.0
Total votes		5,796	100.0

=== Republican primary ===
==== Declared ====
- David Morgan, candidate for the 14th district in 2022

==== Results ====
Republican primary results
Party	Candidate	Votes	%
Republican	David Morgan	4,261	100.0
Total votes		4,261	100.0

=== General election ===
==== Results ====
General election results
Party	Candidate	Votes	%
Democratic	Sean Brennan (incumbent)	27,918	59.7
Republican	David Morgan	19,604	40.3
Total votes		46,802	100.0

== District 15 ==
=== Democratic primary ===
==== Declared ====
- Chris Glassburn
- TJ Mulloy

==== Declined ====
- Richard Dell'Aquila, incumbent state representative (running for Cuyahoga County Council)

==== Results ====
Democratic primary results
Party	Candidate	Votes	%
Democratic	Chris Glassburn	5,237	74.9
Democratic	TJ Mulloy	1,755	25.1
Total votes		6,992	100.0

=== Republican primary ===
==== Declared ====
- Aaron L. Borowski
- Ryan McClain

==== Results ====
Republican primary results
Party	Candidate	Votes	%
Republican	Aaron L. Borowski	3,270	55.4
Republican	Ryan McClain	2,630	44.6
Total votes		5,900	100.0

=== General election ===
==== Results ====
General election results
Party	Candidate	Votes	%
Democratic	Chris Glassburn	27,121	54.5
Republican	Aaron L. Borowski	22,599	45.5
Total votes		49,720	100.0

== District 16 ==
=== Democratic primary ===
==== Declared ====
- Bride Rose Sweeney, incumbent state representative

==== Results ====
Democratic primary results
Party	Candidate	Votes	%
Democratic	Bride Rose Sweeney (incumbent)	8,459	100.0
Total votes		8,459	100.0

=== Republican primary ===
==== Declared ====
- Daniel James Harrington, United States Marine Corps veteran and small business owner

==== Results ====
Republican primary results
Party	Candidate	Votes	%
Republican	Dan Harrington	5,490	100.0
Total votes		5,490	100.0

=== General election ===
==== Results ====
General election results
Party	Candidate	Votes	%
Democratic	Bride Rose Sweeney (incumbent)	37,653	60.7
Republican	Dan Harrington	24,375	39.3
Total votes		62,028	100.0

== District 17 ==
=== Republican primary ===
==== Declared ====
- Anthony Leon Alexander
- Mike Dovilla, former state representative from the 7th district (2011–2016)
- Gordon Short, Strongsville city councillor

==== Failed to qualify ====
- Jonah Schultz

==== Endorsements ====
Mike Dovilla

Organizations

- Americans for Prosperity
- Ohio Right to Life
Gordon Short

State senators

- Matt Dolan, SD-24 (2017–present); former state representative from HD-98 (2005–2010)

State representatives

- Tom Patton, HD-17 (2023–present), HD-07 (2017–2022), HD-18 (2003–2008); former state senator from SD-24 (2008–2016)

Newspapers

- The Plain Dealer (Republican primary only)

==== Results ====
Republican primary results
Party	Candidate	Votes	%
Republican	Mike Dovilla	5,768	49.3
Republican	Gordon Short	5,415	46.2
Republican	Anthony Leon Alexander	525	4.5
Total votes		11,708	100.0

=== Democratic primary ===
==== Declared ====
- Jessica Sutherland

==== Results ====
Democratic primary results
Party	Candidate	Votes	%
Democratic	Jessica Sutherland	6,451	100.0
Total votes		6,451	100.0

=== General election ===
==== Results ====
General election results
Party	Candidate	Votes	%
Democratic	Jessica Sutherland	28,643	45.4
Republican	Mike Dovilla	34,403	54.6
Total votes		63,046	100

== District 18 ==
=== Democratic primary ===
==== Declared ====
- Juanita Brent, incumbent state representative (redistricted from the 22nd district)

==== Results ====
Democratic primary results
Party	Candidate	Votes	%
Democratic	Juanita Brent (incumbent)	13,517	100.0
Total votes		13,517	100.0

=== Republican primary ===
==== Declared ====
- Justyn Anderson (write-in)

==== Results ====
Republican primary results
Party	Candidate	Votes	%
Republican	Justyn Anderson	277	100.0
Total votes		277	100.0

=== Independents ===
- Christela Neal (write-in)

=== General election ===
==== Results ====
General election results
Party	Candidate	Votes	%
Democratic	Juanita Brent (incumbent)	50,276	89.3
Republican	Justyn Anderson	5,991	10.7
Independent	Christela Neal	5	0.0
Total votes		56,272	100.0

== District 19 ==
=== Democratic primary ===
==== Declared ====
- Phil Robinson, incumbent state representative

==== Results ====
Democratic primary results
Party	Candidate	Votes	%
Democratic	Phil Robinson (incumbent)	7,412	100.0
Total votes		7,412	100.0

=== Republican primary ===
==== Declared ====
- Kenny Godnavec

==== Results ====
Republican primary results
Party	Candidate	Votes	%
Republican	Kenny Godnavec	6,037	100.0
Total votes		6,037	100.0

=== General election ===
==== Results ====
General election results
Party	Candidate	Votes	%
Democratic	Phil Robinson (incumbent)	36,778	57.0
Republican	Kenny Godnavec	27,718	43.0
Total votes		64,496	100.0

== District 20 ==
=== Democratic primary ===
==== Declared ====
- Nathaniel Cory Hartfield (write-in)
- Terrence Upchurch, incumbent state representative (write-in)

==== Results ====
Democratic primary results
Party	Candidate	Votes	%
Democratic	Terrence Upchurch (incumbent)	1,807	98.9
Democratic	Nathaniel Cory Hartfield	21	1.1
Total votes		1,828	100.0

=== Republican primary ===
==== Declared ====
- Donna Walker-Brown

==== Results ====
Republican primary results
Party	Candidate	Votes	%
Republican	Donna Walker-Brown	527	100.0
Total votes		527	100.0

=== General election ===
==== Results ====
General election results
Party	Candidate	Votes	%
Democratic	Terrence Upchurch (incumbent)	27,309	85.4
Republican	Donna Walker-Brown	4,678	14.6
Total votes		31,897	100.0

== District 21 ==
=== Democratic primary ===
==== Declared ====
- Elliot Forhan, incumbent state representative
- Eric Synenberg, Beachwood city councilor
- Angel Washington, small business owner

==== Withdrawn ====
- Juan A. Goodwin
- Jonathan Holody, candidate for the 21st district in 2022

==== Results ====
Democratic primary results
Party	Candidate	Votes	%
Democratic	Eric Synenberg	5,573	45.4
Democratic	Angel Washington	5,226	42.6
Democratic	Elliot Forhan (incumbent)	1,475	12.0
Total votes		12,274	100.0

=== Republican primary ===
==== Declared ====
- Joshua Malovasic (write-in)

==== Results ====
Republican primary results
Party	Candidate	Votes	%
Republican	Joshua Malovasic	527	100.0
Total votes		527	100.0

=== General election ===
==== Results ====
General election results
Party	Candidate	Votes	%
Democratic	Eric Synenberg	42,376	79.2
Republican	Joshua Malovasic	11,116	20.8
Total votes		53,492	100.0

== District 22 ==
=== Democratic primary ===
==== Declared ====
- Darnell Brewer, incumbent state representative (redistricted from the 18th district)

==== Results ====
Democratic primary results
Party	Candidate	Votes	%
Democratic	Darnell Brewer (incumbent)	7,325	100.0
Total votes		7,325	100.0

=== Republican primary ===
==== Declared ====
- Milan Wesley (write-in)

==== Results ====
Republican primary results
Party	Candidate	Votes	%
Republican	Milan Wesley	238	100.0
Total votes		238	100.0

=== General election ===
==== Results ====
General election results
Party	Candidate	Votes	%
Democratic	Darnell Brewer (incumbent)	35,522	86.3
Republican	Milan Wesley	5,617	13.7
Total votes		41,139	100.0

== District 23 ==
=== Democratic primary ===
==== Declared ====
- Dan Troy, incumbent state representative

==== Results ====
Democratic primary results
Party	Candidate	Votes	%
Democratic	Dan Troy (incumbent)	5,662	100.0
Total votes		5,662	100.0

=== Republican primary ===
==== Declared ====
- Tony Hocevar

==== Results ====
Republican primary results
Party	Candidate	Votes	%
Republican	Tony Hocevar	7,693	100.0
Total votes		7,693	100.0

=== General election ===
==== Results ====
General election results
Party	Candidate	Votes	%
Democratic	Dan Troy (incumbent)	33,941	52.9
Republican	Tony Hocevar	30,241	47.1
Total votes		64,182	100.0

== District 24 ==
=== Democratic primary ===
==== Declared ====
- Dani Isaacsohn, incumbent state representative
- Stephan Pryor

==== Results ====
Democratic primary results
Party	Candidate	Votes	%
Democratic	Dani Isaacsohn (incumbent)	2,411	71.1
Democratic	Stephan Pryor	978	28.9
Total votes		3,389	100.0

=== Republican primary ===
==== Declared ====
- John Sess

==== Results ====
Republican primary results
Party	Candidate	Votes	%
Republican	John Sess	1,505	100.0
Total votes		1,505	100.0

=== General election ===
==== Results ====
General election results
Party	Candidate	Votes	%
Democratic	Dani Isaacsohn (incumbent)	27,744	72.5
Republican	John Sess	10,526	17.5
Total votes		38,270	100.0

== District 25 ==
=== Democratic primary ===
==== Declared ====
- Cecil Thomas, incumbent state representative

==== Results ====
Democratic primary results
Party	Candidate	Votes	%
Democratic	Cecil Thomas (incumbent)	5,251	100.0
Total votes		5,251	100.0

=== Republican primary ===
==== Declared ====
- Jim Berns, perennial candidate

==== Results ====
Republican primary results
Party	Candidate	Votes	%
Republican	Jim Berns	1,047	100.0
Total votes		1,047	100.0

=== General election ===
==== Results ====
General election results
Party	Candidate	Votes	%
Democratic	Cecil Thomas (incumbent)	34,264	84.0
Republican	Jim Berns	6,517	16.0
Total votes		40,781	100.0

== District 26 ==
=== Democratic primary ===
==== Declared ====
- Sedrick Denson, incumbent state representative

==== Results ====
Democratic primary results
Party	Candidate	Votes	%
Democratic	Sedrick Denson (incumbent)	5,505	100.0
Total votes		5,505	100.0

=== Republican primary ===
==== Declared ====
- John Breadon

==== Results ====
Republican primary results
Party	Candidate	Votes	%
Republican	John Breadon	2,910	100.0
Total votes		2,910	100.0

=== General election ===
==== Results ====
General election results
Party	Candidate	Votes	%
Democratic	Sedrick Denson (incumbent)	42,296	69.1
Republican	John Breadon	18,926	30.9
Total votes		61,222	100.0

== District 27 ==
=== Democratic primary ===
==== Declared ====
- Rachel Baker, incumbent state representative

==== Results ====
Democratic primary results
Party	Candidate	Votes	%
Democratic	Rachel Baker (incumbent)	4,938	100.0
Total votes		4,938	100.0

=== Republican primary ===
==== Declared ====
- Curt C. Hartman, attorney

==== Results ====
Republican primary results
Party	Candidate	Votes	%
Republican	Curt C. Hartman	6,428	100.0
Total votes		6,428	100.0

=== General election ===
==== Results ====
General election results
Party	Candidate	Votes	%
Democratic	Rachel Baker (incumbent)	39,483	55.8
Republican	Curt C. Hartman	31,331	44.2
Total votes		70,814	100.0

== District 28 ==
=== Democratic primary ===
==== Declared ====
- Jessica Miranda, incumbent state representative

==== Failed to qualify ====
- Regina Collins

==== Results ====
Democratic primary results
Party	Candidate	Votes	%
Democratic	Jessica Miranda (incumbent)	4,741	100.0
Total votes		4,741	100.0

=== Republican primary ===
==== Declared ====
- Jenn Giroux

==== Results ====
Republican primary results
Party	Candidate	Votes	%
Republican	Jenn Giroux	5,915	100.0
Total votes		5,915	100.0

=== General election ===
==== Results ====
General election results
Party	Candidate	Votes	%
Democratic	Karen Brownlee	35,671	55.9
Republican	Jenn Giroux	28,121	44.1
Independent	Regina Collins (write-in)	5	0.0
Total votes		63,797	100.0

== District 29 ==
=== Republican primary ===
==== Declared ====
- Cindy Abrams, incumbent state representative
- George Brunemann

==== Endorsements ====
Cindy Abrams

Organizations

- Ohio Right to Life

==== Results ====
Republican primary results
Party	Candidate	Votes	%
Republican	Cindy Abrams (incumbent)	6,064	58.9
Republican	George Brunemann	4,233	41.1
Total votes		10,297	100.0

=== Democratic primary ===
==== Declared ====
- Joe Salvato

==== Results ====
Democratic primary results
Party	Candidate	Votes	%
Democratic	Joe Salvato	3,145	100.0
Total votes		3,145	100.0

=== General election ===
==== Results ====
General election results
Party	Candidate	Votes	%
Democratic	Joe Salvato	24,639	42.8
Republican	Cindy Abrams (incumbent)	32,927	57.2
Total votes		57,566	100.0

== District 30 ==
=== Republican primary ===
==== Declared ====
- Mike Odioso, teacher and political activist

==== Results ====
Republican primary results
Party	Candidate	Votes	%
Republican	Mike Odioso	7,787	100.0
Total votes		7,787	100.0

=== Democratic primary ===
==== Declared ====
- Stefanie A. Hawk, Cheviot city councilor
- Andrew Voynovich

==== Results ====
Democratic primary results
Party	Candidate	Votes	%
Democratic	Stefanie A. Hawk	1,853	77.7
Democratic	Andrew Voynovich	532	22.3
Total votes		2,385	100.0

=== General election ===
==== Results ====
General election results
Party	Candidate	Votes	%
Democratic	Stefanie A. Hawk	19,486	31.3
Republican	Mike Odioso	42,863	68.7
Total votes		62,349	100.0

== District 31 ==
=== Republican primary ===
==== Declared ====
- Bill Roemer, incumbent state representative

==== Declined ====
- Thomas "Bebe" Heitic, Barberton city councillor

==== Results ====
Republican primary results
Party	Candidate	Votes	%
Republican	Bill Roemer (incumbent)	8,042	100.0
Total votes		8,042	100.0

=== Democratic primary ===
==== Declared ====
- A. J. Harris, Cuyahoga Falls Schools Board of Education member

==== Failed to qualify ====
- Ryan Shank, membership director for the Summit County Young Democrats

==== Results ====
Democratic primary results
Party	Candidate	Votes	%
Democratic	A. J. Harris	5,524	100.0
Total votes		5,524	100.0

=== General election ===
==== Results ====
General election results
Party	Candidate	Votes	%
Democratic	A. J. Harris	30,311	47.0
Republican	Bill Roemer	34,149	53.0
Total votes		64,460	100.0

== District 32 ==
=== Republican primary ===
==== Declared ====
- Jack Daniels, New Franklin city councilor
- Mary Stormer

==== Endorsements ====
Jack Daniels

Organizations

- Americans for Prosperity

==== Results ====
Republican primary results
Party	Candidate	Votes	%
Republican	Jack Daniels	6,836	72.2
Republican	Mary Stormer	2,637	27.8
Total votes		9,473	100.0

=== Democratic primary ===
==== Declared ====
- Jim Colopy

==== Results ====
Democratic primary results
Party	Candidate	Votes	%
Democratic	Jim Colopy	4,576	100.0
Total votes		4,576	100.0

=== General election ===
==== Results ====
General election results
Party	Candidate	Votes	%
Democratic	Jim Colopy	23,193	42.8
Republican	Jack Daniels	31,050	57.2
Total votes		54,243	100.0

== District 33 ==
=== Democratic primary ===
==== Declared ====
- Veronica Sims, incumbent state representative

==== Results ====
Democratic primary results
Party	Candidate	Votes	%
Democratic	Veronica Sims	6,486	100.0
Total votes		6,486	100.0

=== General election ===
==== Results ====
General election results
Party	Candidate	Votes	%
Democratic	Veronica Sims	37,146	100.0
Total votes		37,146	100.0

== District 34 ==
=== Democratic primary ===
==== Declared ====
- Dina Edwards
- Derrick Hall, former Akron Public Schools Board of Education president
- Nathan Jarosz, Summit County Progressive Democrats president

==== Declined ====
- Casey Weinstein, incumbent state representative (running for Ohio Senate)

==== Results ====
Democratic primary results
Party	Candidate	Votes	%
Democratic	Derrick Hall	3,035	38.4
Democratic	Nathan Jarosz	2,478	31.3
Democratic	Dina Edwards	2,391	30.3
Total votes		7,904	100.0

=== Republican primary ===
==== Declared ====
- Adam Bozic

==== Results ====
Republican primary results
Party	Candidate	Votes	%
Republican	Adam Bozic	7,396	100.0
Total votes		7,396	100.0

=== General election ===
==== Results ====
General election results
Party	Candidate	Votes	%
Democratic	Derrick Hall	32,674	53.2
Republican	Adam Bozic	28,763	46.8
Total votes		61,437	100.0

== District 35 ==
=== Republican primary ===
==== Declared ====
- Steve Demetriou, incumbent state representative

==== Results ====
Republican primary results
Party	Candidate	Votes	%
Republican	Steve Demetriou (incumbent)	9,353	100.0
Total votes		9,353	100.0

=== Democratic primary ===
==== Declared ====
- Mark Curtis

==== Results ====
Democratic primary results
Party	Candidate	Votes	%
Democratic	Mark Curtis	6,027	100.0
Total votes		6,027	100.0

=== General election ===
==== Results ====
General election results
Party	Candidate	Votes	%
Democratic	Mark Curtis	33,375	47.5
Republican	Steve Demetriou (incumbent)	36,961	52.5
Total votes		70,336	100.0

== District 36 ==
=== Republican primary ===
==== Declared ====
- Andrea White, incumbent state representative

==== Results ====
Republican primary results
Party	Candidate	Votes	%
Republican	Andrea White (incumbent)	6,639	100.0
Total votes		6,639	100.0

=== Democratic primary ===
==== Declared ====
- Chuck Horn, attorney and Democratic nominee for the 52nd district in 2020 and the 45th district in 2022
- Rose Lounsbury, author and lifestyle coach

==== Results ====
Democratic primary results
Party	Candidate	Votes	%
Democratic	Rose Lounsbury	4,700	73.7
Democratic	Chuck Horn	1,680	26.3
Total votes		6,380	100.0

=== General election ===
==== Results ====
General election results
Party	Candidate	Votes	%
Republican	Andrea White (incumbent)	29,757	52.4
Democratic	Rose Lounsbury	27,060	47.6
Total votes		56,817	100.0

== District 37 ==
=== Republican primary ===
==== Declared ====
- Tom Young, incumbent state representative

==== Results ====
Republican primary results
Party	Candidate	Votes	%
Republican	Tom Young (incumbent)	10,076	100.0
Total votes		10,076	100.0

=== Democratic primary ===
==== Withdrawn ====
- Rebecca Avery Neal

=== General election ===
==== Results ====
General election results
Party	Candidate	Votes	%
Republican	Tom Young (incumbent)	43,003	100.0
Total votes		43,003	100.0

== District 38 ==
=== Democratic primary ===
==== Declared ====
- Derrick L. Foward, president of the Dayton NAACP
- Desiree Tims, president & CEO of Innovation Ohio; nominee for Ohio's 10th congressional district in 2020

==== Declined ====
- Willis Blackshear Jr., incumbent state representative (running for Ohio Senate)

==== Results ====
Democratic primary results
Party	Candidate	Votes	%
Democratic	Desiree Tims	6,122	71.7
Democratic	Derrick L. Foward	2,413	28.3
Total votes		8,535	100.0

=== General election ===
==== Results ====
General election results
Party	Candidate	Votes	%
Democratic	Desiree Tims	34,877	100.0
Total votes		34,877	100.0

== District 39 ==
=== Republican primary ===
==== Declared ====
- Phil Plummer, incumbent state representative

==== Results ====
Republican primary results
Party	Candidate	Votes	%
Republican	Phil Plummer (incumbent)	7,885	100.0
Total votes		7,885	100.0

=== Democratic primary ===
==== Declared ====
- Dion Green, founder and CEO of FUDGE Foundation (write-in)

==== Results ====
Democratic primary results
Party	Candidate	Votes	%
Democratic	Dion Green	162	100.0
Total votes		162	100.0

=== General election ===
==== Results ====
General election results
Party	Candidate	Votes	%
Republican	Phil Plummer (incumbent)	32,191	58.8
Democratic	Dion Green	22,541	41.2
Total votes		54,732	100.0

== District 40 ==
=== Republican primary ===
==== Declared ====
- Rodney Creech, incumbent state representative

==== Results ====
Republican primary results
Party	Candidate	Votes	%
Republican	Rodney Creech (incumbent)	11,916	100.0
Total votes		11,916	100.0

=== Democratic primary ===
==== Declared ====
- Bobbie Arnold
- Logan Turner (write-in)

==== Results ====
Democratic primary results
Party	Candidate	Votes	%
Democratic	Bobbie Arnold	2,027	99.7
Democratic	Logan Turner	7	0.3
Total votes		2,034	100.0

=== General election ===
==== Results ====
General election results
Party	Candidate	Votes	%
Republican	Rodney Creech (incumbent)	45,615	77.1
Democratic	Bobbie Arnold	13,569	22.9
Total votes		59,184	100.0

== District 41 ==
=== Democratic primary ===
==== Declared ====
- Erika White, president of Communications Workers of America Local 4319, vice president of the Greater Northwest Ohio AFL-CIO, and Democratic nominee for the 42nd district in 2022

==== Withdrawn ====
- Colin Flanagan, student and candidate for the 41st district in 2022

==== Results ====
Democratic primary results
Party	Candidate	Votes	%
Democratic	Erika White	4,890	80.6
Democratic	Colin Flanagan	1,181	19.4
Total votes		6,071	100.0

=== Republican primary ===
==== Declared ====
- Josiah Leinbach

==== Results ====
Republican primary results
Party	Candidate	Votes	%
Republican	Josiah Leinbach	3,968	100.0
Total votes		3,968	100.0

=== General election ===
==== Results ====
General election results
Party	Candidate	Votes	%
Democratic	Erika White	31,027	61.0
Republican	Josiah Leinbach	19,863	39.0
Total votes		50,890	100.0

== District 42 ==
=== Democratic primary ===
==== Declared ====
- Elgin Rogers, Jr., incumbent state representative (redistricted from the 44th district)

==== Results ====
Democratic primary results
Party	Candidate	Votes	%
Democratic	Elgin Rogers, Jr. (incumbent)	4,286	100.0
Total votes		4,286	100.0

=== General election ===
==== Results ====
General election results
Party	Candidate	Votes	%
Democratic	Elgin Rogers, Jr. (incumbent)	28,382	100.0
Total votes		28,382	100.0

== District 43 ==
=== Democratic primary ===
==== Declared ====
- Michele Grim, incumbent state representative

==== Results ====
Democratic primary results
Party	Candidate	Votes	%
Democratic	Michele Grim (incumbent)	5,241	100.0
Total votes		5,241	100.0

=== Republican primary ===
==== Declared ====
- Wendi Hendricks, candidate for the 43rd district in 2022

==== Results ====
Republican primary results
Party	Candidate	Votes	%
Republican	Wendi Hendricks	3,354	100.0
Total votes		3,354	100.0

=== General election ===
==== Results ====
General election results
Party	Candidate	Votes	%
Democratic	Michele Grim (incumbent)	26,881	60.3
Republican	Wendi Hendricks	17,661	39.7
Total votes		44,542	100.0

== District 44 ==
=== Republican primary ===
==== Declared ====
- Josh Williams, incumbent state representative (redistricted from the 41st district)

==== Results ====
Republican primary results
Party	Candidate	Votes	%
Republican	Josh Williams (incumbent)	9,057	100.0
Total votes		9,057	100.0

=== Democratic primary ===
==== Declared ====
- Dave Blyth

==== Results ====
Democratic primary results
Party	Candidate	Votes	%
Democratic	Dave Blyth	5,645	100.0
Total votes		5,645	100.0

=== General election ===
==== Results ====
General election results
Party	Candidate	Votes	%
Democratic	Dave Blyth	27,818	42.3
Republican	Josh Williams (incumbent)	37,915	57.7
Total votes		65,733	100.0

== District 45 ==
=== Republican primary ===
==== Declared ====
- Jennifer Gross, incumbent state representative

==== Results ====
Republican primary results
Party	Candidate	Votes	%
Republican	Jennifer Gross (incumbent)	10,719	100.0
Total votes		10,719	100.0

=== Democratic primary ===
==== Declared ====
- Landon Meador

==== Results ====
Democratic primary results
Party	Candidate	Votes	%
Democratic	Landon Meador	3,146	100.0
Total votes		3,146	100.0

=== General election ===
==== Results ====
General election results
Party	Candidate	Votes	%
Democratic	Landon Meador	23,138	38.1
Republican	Jennifer Gross (incumbent)	37,565	61.9
Total votes		60,703	100.0

== District 46 ==
=== Republican primary ===
==== Declared ====
- Thomas Hall, incumbent state representative
- Zachary Stacy

==== Endorsements ====
Thomas Hall

Organizations

- Ohio Right to Life

==== Results ====
Republican primary results
Party	Candidate	Votes	%
Republican	Thomas Hall (incumbent)	9,016	83.7
Republican	Zachary Stacy	1,754	16.3
Total votes		10,770	100.0

=== Democratic primary ===
==== Declared ====
- Benjamin McCall

==== Results ====
Democratic primary results
Party	Candidate	Votes	%
Democratic	Benjamin McCall	2,433	100.0
Total votes		2,433	100.0

=== General election ===
==== Results ====
General election results
Party	Candidate	Votes	%
Democratic	Benjamin McCall	19,235	33.7
Republican	Thomas Hall (incumbent)	37,819	66.3
Total votes		57,054	100.0

== District 47 ==
=== Republican primary ===
==== Declared ====
- Sara Carruthers, incumbent state representative
- Diane Mullins

==== Endorsements ====
Sara Carruthers

Organizations

- Ohio Right to Life
Diane Mullins

Organizations

- Butler County Republican Party

==== Results ====
Republican primary results
Party	Candidate	Votes	%
Republican	Diane Mullins	5,370	53.1
Republican	Sara Carruthers (incumbent)	4,742	46.9
Total votes		10,112	100.0

=== Democratic primary ===
==== Declared ====
- Vanessa Cummings

==== Results ====
Democratic primary results
Party	Candidate	Votes	%
Democratic	Vanessa Cummings	2,749	100.0
Total votes		2,749	100.0

=== General election ===
==== Results ====
General election results
Party	Candidate	Votes	%
Democratic	Vanessa Cummings	18,470	38.4
Republican	Diane Mullins	29,643	61.6
Total votes		48,113	100.0

== District 48 ==
=== Republican primary ===
==== Declared ====
- Scott Oelslager, incumbent state representative

==== Results ====
Republican primary results
Party	Candidate	Votes	%
Republican	Scott Oelslager (incumbent)	14,306	100.0
Total votes		14,306	100.0

=== Democratic primary ===
==== Declared ====
- Lynn C. Gorman

==== Results ====
Democratic primary results
Party	Candidate	Votes	%
Democratic	Lynn C. Gorman	5,711	100.0
Total votes		5,711	100.0

=== General election ===
==== Results ====
General election results
Party	Candidate	Votes	%
Democratic	Lynn C. Gorman	20,182	31.1%
Republican	Scott Oelslager (incumbent)	44,717	68.9%
Total votes		64,899	100.0

== District 49 ==
=== Republican primary ===
==== Declared ====
- Jim Thomas, incumbent state representative

==== Results ====
Republican primary results
Party	Candidate	Votes	%
Republican	Jim Thomas (incumbent)	7,070	100.0
Total votes		7,070	100.0

=== Democratic primary ===
==== Declared ====
- Krista L. Allison

==== Results ====
Democratic primary results
Party	Candidate	Votes	%
Democratic	Krista L. Allison	4,679	100.0
Total votes		4,679	100.0

=== General election ===
==== Results ====
General election results
Party	Candidate	Votes	%
Democratic	Krista L. Allison	22,601	47.6
Republican	Jim Thomas (incumbent)	24,871	52.4
Total votes		47,472	100.0

== District 50 ==
=== Republican primary ===
==== Declared ====
- Matthew Kishman, Minerva village councillor

==== Declined ====
- Reggie Stoltzfus, incumbent state representative (running for U.S. representative)

==== Results ====
Republican primary results
Party	Candidate	Votes	%
Republican	Matthew Kishman	9,948	100.0
Total votes		9,948	100.0

=== Democratic primary ===
==== Declared ====
- Doremus C. Redvine (write-in)

==== Disqualified ====
- Vanessa Joy, photographer

==== Results ====
Democratic primary results
Party	Candidate	Votes	%
Democratic	Doremus C. Redvine	106	100.0
Total votes		106	100.0

=== General election ===
==== Results ====
General election results
Party	Candidate	Votes	%
Democratic	Doremus C. Redvine	18,098	33.4%
Republican	Matthew Kishman	36,149	66.6%
Total votes		54,247	100.0

== District 51 ==
=== Republican primary ===
==== Declared ====
- Brett Hillyer, incumbent state representative
- Jodi Salvo, social worker

==== Results ====
Republican primary results
Party	Candidate	Votes	%
Republican	Jodi Salvo	6,859	58.8
Republican	Brett Hillyer (incumbent)	4,815	41.2
Total votes		11,674	100.0

=== Democratic primary ===
==== Declared ====
- John Bazaar, businessman
- Joe Rinehart, professor

==== Results ====
Democratic primary results
Party	Candidate	Votes	%
Democratic	Joe Rinehart	2,355	73.0
Democratic	John Bazaar	873	27.0
Total votes		3,228	100.0

=== General election ===
==== Results ====
General election results
Party	Candidate	Votes	%
Republican	Jodi Salvo	37,433	72.5
Democratic	Joe Rinehart	14,203	27.5
Total votes		51,636	100.0

== District 52 ==
=== Republican primary ===
==== Declared ====
- Gayle Manning, incumbent state representative

==== Results ====
Republican primary results
Party	Candidate	Votes	%
Republican	Gayle Manning (incumbent)	7,661	100.0
Total votes		7,661	100.0

=== Democratic primary ===
==== Declared ====
- Genevieve Flieger

==== Results ====
Democratic primary results
Party	Candidate	Votes	%
Democratic	Genevieve Flieger	5,976	100.0
Total votes		5,976	100.0

=== General election ===
==== Results ====
General election results
Party	Candidate	Votes	%
Democratic	Genevieve Flieger	25,755	42.8
Republican	Gayle Manning (incumbent)	34,378	57.2
Total votes		60,133	100.0

== District 53 ==
=== Democratic primary ===
==== Declared ====
- Joe Miller, incumbent state representative

==== Results ====
Democratic primary results
Party	Candidate	Votes	%
Democratic	Joe Miller (incumbent)	6,693	100.0
Total votes		6,693	100.0

=== Republican primary ===
==== Declared ====
- Bradley Lacko, small business owner

==== Results ====
Republican primary results
Party	Candidate	Votes	%
Republican	Bradley Lacko	5,084	100.0
Total votes		5,084	100.0

=== General election ===
==== Results ====
General election results
Party	Candidate	Votes	%
Democratic	Joe Miller (incumbent)	29,205	56.3
Republican	Bradley Lacko	22,695	43.7
Total votes		51,900	100.0

== District 54 ==
=== Republican primary ===
==== Declared ====
- Kellie Deeter, nurse and small business owner
- Anthony Savage, youth pastor

==== Endorsements ====
Kellie Deeter

State representatives

- Terry Boose, HD-57 (2013–2016), HD-58 (2009–2012)
- Dick Stein, HD-54 (2023–present), HD-57 (2017–2022)

Organizations

- Huron County Republican Party
- Ohio Chamber of Commerce
- Ohio Right to Life

==== Results ====
Republican primary results
Party	Candidate	Votes	%
Republican	Kellie Deeter	9,116	73.2
Republican	Anthony Savage	3,342	26.8
Total votes		12,458	100.0

=== Democratic primary ===
==== Declared ====
- Brenda Buchanan

==== Results ====
Democratic primary results
Party	Candidate	Votes	%
Democratic	Brenda Buchanan	4,884	100.0
Total votes		4,884	100.0

=== General election ===
==== Results ====
General election results
Party	Candidate	Votes	%
Democratic	Brenda Buchanan	20,685	34.5
Republican	Kellie Deeter	39,271	65.5
Independent	Andrew Leonard (write-in)	8	0.0
Total votes		59,964	100.0

== District 55 ==
=== Republican primary ===
==== Declared ====
- Ben McCullough, sergeant first class in the United States Army Reserve
- C. Michelle Teska, businesswoman

==== Withdrawn ====
- Thomas Goodwin
- Scott Hughes
- Kim Lukens

==== Endorsements ====
Michelle Teska

Organizations

- Americans for Prosperity

==== Results ====
Republican primary results
Party	Candidate	Votes	%
Republican	C. Michelle Teska	10,098	64.8
Republican	Ben McCullough	5,476	35.2
Total votes		15,574	100.0

=== Democratic primary ===
==== Declared ====
- Laura Marie Davis

==== Results ====
Democratic primary results
Party	Candidate	Votes	%
Democratic	Laura Marie Davis	2,634	100.0
Total votes		2,634	100.0

=== General election ===
==== Results ====
General election results
Party	Candidate	Votes	%
Democratic	Laura Marie Davis	19,583	27.5
Republican	C. Michelle Teska	51,698	72.5
Total votes		71,281	100.0

== District 56 ==
=== Republican primary ===
==== Declared ====
- Kathy Grossmann, Mason city councilor
- Adam Mathews, incumbent state representative
- Heather Salyer

==== Endorsements ====
Adam Mathews

Organizations

- Americans for Prosperity
- National Federation of Independent Business
- Ohio Right to Life

==== Results ====
Republican primary results
Party	Candidate	Votes	%
Republican	Adam Matthews (incumbent)	6,191	44.5
Republican	Kathy Grossmann	4,365	31.3
Republican	Heather Salyer	3,374	24.2
Total votes		13,930	100.0

=== Democratic primary ===
==== Declared ====
- Cleveland Canova

==== Results ====
Democratic primary results
Party	Candidate	Votes	%
Democratic	Cleveland Canova	3,261	100.0
Total votes		3,261	100.0

=== General election ===
==== Results ====
General election results
Party	Candidate	Votes	%
Democratic	Cleveland Canova	23,510	37.4
Republican	Adam Matthews (incumbent)	39,280	62.6
Total votes		62,790	100.0

== District 57 ==
=== Republican primary ===
==== Declared ====
- Jamie Callender, incumbent state representative

==== Results ====
Republican primary results
Party	Candidate	Votes	%
Republican	Jamie Callender (incumbent)	10,604	100.0
Total votes		10,604	100.0

=== Democratic primary ===
==== Declared ====
- Rick Walker

==== Results ====
Democratic primary results
Party	Candidate	Votes	%
Democratic	Rick Walker	3,976	100.0
Total votes		3,976	100.0

=== General election ===
==== Results ====
General election results
Party	Candidate	Votes	%
Democratic	Rick Walker	24,468	37.4
Republican	Jamie Callender (incumbent)	40,994	62.6
Total votes		65,462	100.0

== District 58 ==
=== Democratic primary ===
==== Declared ====
- Lauren McNally, incumbent state representative (redistricted from the 59th district)

==== Results ====
Democratic primary results
Party	Candidate	Votes	%
Democratic	Lauren McNally (incumbent)	6,761	100.0
Total votes		6,761	100.0

=== Republican primary ===
==== Declared ====
- Emily Ciccone (write-in)

==== Withdrawn ====
- Jennifer J. Ciccone

==== Results ====
Republican primary results
Party	Candidate	Votes	%
Republican	Emily Ciccone	191	100.0
Total votes		191	100.0

=== General election ===
==== Results ====
General election results
Party	Candidate	Votes	%
Democratic	Lauren McNally (incumbent)	28,937	58.0
Republican	Emily Ciccone	20,938	42.0
Total votes		49,875	100.0

== District 59 ==
=== Republican primary ===
==== Declared ====
- Alessandro Cutrona, incumbent state representative (redistricted from the 58th district)

==== Results ====
Republican primary results
Party	Candidate	Votes	%
Republican	Alessandro Cutrona (incumbent)	10,498	100.0
Total votes		10,498	100.0

=== Democratic primary ===
==== Declared ====
- Laura Schaeffer, Beloit village councilor

==== Results ====
Democratic primary results
Party	Candidate	Votes	%
Democratic	Laura Schaeffer	5,455	100.0
Total votes		5,455	100.0

=== General election ===
==== Results ====
General election results
Party	Candidate	Votes	%
Democratic	Laura Schaeffer	26,294	42.9
Republican	Tex Fischer (incumbent)	34,950	57.1
Total votes		61,244	100.0

== District 60 ==
=== Republican primary ===
==== Declared ====
- Brian Lorenz, incumbent state representative

==== Endorsements ====
Brian Lorenz

Organizations

- Delaware County Republican Party

==== Results ====
Republican primary results
Party	Candidate	Votes	%
Republican	Brian Lorenz (incumbent)	12,534	100.0
Total votes		12,534	100.0

=== Democratic primary ===
==== Declared ====
- Rachael Morocco

==== Results ====
Democratic primary results
Party	Candidate	Votes	%
Democratic	Rachael Morocco	6,004	100.0
Total votes		6,004	100.0

=== General election ===
==== Results ====
General election results
Party	Candidate	Votes	%
Republican	Brian Lorenz (incumbent)	37,345	54.3
Democratic	Rachael Morocco	31,492	45.7
Total votes		68,837	100.0

== District 61 ==
=== Republican primary ===
==== Declared ====
- Michael Holt
- Beth Lear, incumbent state representative

==== Endorsements ====
Beth Lear

Organizations

- Americans for Prosperity
- Delaware County Republican Party
- Ohio Right to Life

==== Results ====
Republican primary results
Party	Candidate	Votes	%
Republican	Beth Lear (incumbent)	12,770	73.3
Republican	Michael Holt	4,661	26.7
Total votes		17,431	100.0

=== Democratic primary ===
==== Declared ====
- David Hogan
- Christian Smith

==== Results ====
Democratic primary results
Party	Candidate	Votes	%
Democratic	David Hogan	3,355	67.1
Democratic	Christian Smith	1,643	32.9
Total votes		4,998	100.0

=== General election ===
==== Results ====
General election results
Party	Candidate	Votes	%
Democratic	David Hogan	27,698	38.2
Republican	Beth Lear (incumbent)	44,808	61.8
Total votes		72,506	100.0

== District 62 ==
=== Republican primary ===
==== Declared ====
- Dillon Blevons
- Jean Schmidt, incumbent state representative

==== Endorsements ====
Jean Schmidt

Organizations

- Ohio Right to Life

==== Results ====
Republican primary results
Party	Candidate	Votes	%
Republican	Jean Schmidt (incumbent)	8,144	51.6
Republican	Dillon Blevons	7,626	48.4
Total votes		15,770	100.0

=== Democratic primary ===
==== Declared ====
- Katie Vockell

==== Results ====
Democratic primary results
Party	Candidate	Votes	%
Democratic	Katie Vockell	2,778	100.0
Total votes		2,778	100.0

=== General election ===
==== Results ====
General election results
Party	Candidate	Votes	%
Democratic	Katie Vockell	24,251	36.5
Republican	Jean Schmidt (incumbent)	42,134	63.5
Total votes		66,385	100.0

== District 63 ==
=== Republican primary ===
==== Declared ====
- Adam Bird, incumbent state representative

==== Results ====
Republican primary results
Party	Candidate	Votes	%
Republican	Adam Bird (incumbent)	12,326	100.0
Total votes		12,326	100.0

=== Democratic primary ===
==== Declared ====
- Tracey D. McCullough

==== Results ====
Democratic primary results
Party	Candidate	Votes	%
Democratic	Tracey D. McCullough	1,845	100.0
Total votes		1,845	100.0

=== General election ===
==== Results ====
General election results
Party	Candidate	Votes	%
Republican	Adam Bird (incumbent)	42,842	75.5
Democratic	Tracey D. McCullough	13,912	24.5
Total votes		56,754	100.0

== District 64 ==
=== Republican primary ===
==== Declared ====
- Nick Santucci, incumbent state representative

==== Results ====
Republican primary results
Party	Candidate	Votes	%
Republican	Nick Santucci (incumbent)	7,820	100.0
Total votes		7,820	100.0

=== Democratic primary ===
==== Declared ====
- Lauren Mathews

==== Results ====
Democratic primary results
Party	Candidate	Votes	%
Democratic	Lauren Mathews	7,155	100.0
Total votes		7,155	100.0

=== General election ===
==== Results ====
General election results
Party	Candidate	Votes	%
Democratic	Lauren Mathews	23,695	43.8
Republican	Nick Santucci (incumbent)	30,439	56.2
Total votes		54,134	100.0

== District 65 ==
=== Republican primary ===
==== Declared ====
- Laurie Magyar, nurse
- David Thomas, Ashtabula County auditor

==== Declined ====
- Mike Loychik, incumbent state representative (running for Ohio Senate)

==== Endorsements ====
David Thomas

Organizations

- Americans for Prosperity
- Ohio Right to Life

==== Results ====
Republican primary results
Party	Candidate	Votes	%
Republican	David Thomas	10,029	71.7
Republican	Laurie Magyar	3,957	28.3
Total votes		13,986	100.0

=== General election ===
==== Results ====
General election results
Party	Candidate	Votes	%
Republican	David Thomas	44,110	100.0
Total votes		44,110	100.0

== District 66 ==
=== Republican primary ===
==== Declared ====
- Gary Fox
- Sharon Ray, incumbent state representative

==== Endorsements ====
Sharon Ray

Organizations

- Ohio Right to Life

==== Results ====
Republican primary results
Party	Candidate	Votes	%
Republican	Sharon Ray (incumbent)	8,643	57.4
Republican	Gary Fox	6,402	42.6
Total votes		15,045	100.0

=== Democratic primary ===
==== Declared ====
- Bradford Scott Quade

==== Results ====
Democratic primary results
Party	Candidate	Votes	%
Democratic	Bradford Scott Quade	4,991	100.0
Total votes		4,991	100.0

=== General election ===
==== Results ====
General election results
Party	Candidate	Votes	%
Democratic	Bradford Scott Quade	22,770	34.6
Republican	Sharon Ray (incumbent)	43,051	65.4
Total votes		65,821	100.0

== District 67 ==
=== Republican primary ===
==== Declared ====
- Melanie Miller, incumbent state representative

==== Results ====
Republican primary results
Party	Candidate	Votes	%
Republican	Melanie Miller (incumbent)	12,670	100.0
Total votes		12,670	100.0

=== Democratic primary ===
==== Declared ====
- Drew McIlveen, student

==== Results ====
Democratic primary results
Party	Candidate	Votes	%
Democratic	Drew McIlveen	3,330	100.0
Total votes		3,330	100.0

=== General election ===
==== Results ====
General election results
Party	Candidate	Votes	%
Republican	Melanie Miller (incumbent)	47,103	100.0
Total votes		47,103	100.0

== District 68 ==
=== Republican primary ===
==== Declared ====
- Thaddeus Claggett, incumbent state representative

==== Results ====
Republican primary results
Party	Candidate	Votes	%
Republican	Thaddeus Claggett (incumbent)	9,568	100.0
Total votes		9,568	100.0

=== Democratic primary ===
==== Declared ====
- Michael E. Smith

==== Results ====
Democratic primary results
Party	Candidate	Votes	%
Democratic	Michael E. Smith	3,784	100.0
Total votes		3,784	100.0

=== General election ===
==== Results ====
General election results
Party	Candidate	Votes	%
Democratic	Michael E. Smith	24,775	41.1
Republican	Thaddeus Claggett (incumbent)	35,448	58.9
Total votes		60,223	100.0

== District 69 ==
=== Republican primary ===
==== Declared ====
- Daniel Kalmbach
- Kevin D. Miller, incumbent state representative

==== Endorsements ====
Daniel Kalmbach

Organizations

- Americans for Prosperity
Kevin D. Miller

Organizations

- Ohio Right to Life

==== Results ====
Republican primary results
Party	Candidate	Votes	%
Republican	Kevin D. Miller (incumbent)	9,845	60.3
Republican	Daniel Kalmbach	6,485	39.7
Total votes		16,330	100.0

=== Democratic primary ===
==== Declared ====
- Jamie Hough

==== Results ====
Democratic primary results
Party	Candidate	Votes	%
Democratic	Jamie Hough	2,825	100.0
Total votes		2,825	100.0

=== General election ===
==== Results ====
General election results
Party	Candidate	Votes	%
Democratic	Jamie Hough	14,048	23.2
Republican	Kevin D. Miller (incumbent)	46,445	76.8
Total votes		60,493	100.0

== District 70 ==
=== Republican primary ===
==== Declared ====
- Brian Lampton, incumbent state representative

==== Results ====
Republican primary results
Party	Candidate	Votes	%
Republican	Brian Lampton (incumbent)	10,989	100.0
Total votes		10,989	100.0

=== Democratic primary ===
==== Declared ====
- Joseph Wilson

==== Results ====
Democratic primary results
Party	Candidate	Votes	%
Democratic	Joseph Wilson	3,453	100.0
Total votes		3,453	100.0

=== General election ===
==== Results ====
General election results
Party	Candidate	Votes	%
Republican	Brian Lampton (incumbent)	38,455	61.5
Democratic	Joseph Wilson	24,030	38.5
Total votes		62,485	100.0

== District 71 ==
=== Republican primary ===
==== Declared ====
- Josh Day, aerospace engineer and Xenia City School Board member
- Levi Dean, Xenia city councilor
- Robert Fudge
- Tyler Scott

==== Endorsements ====
Levi Dean

Organizations

- Americans for Prosperity

==== Results ====
Republican primary results
Party	Candidate	Votes	%
Republican	Levi Dean	7,227	45.6
Republican	Josh Day	4,155	26.2
Republican	Robert Fudge	2,668	16.9
Republican	Tyler Scott	1,790	11.3
Total votes		15,840	100.0

=== Democratic primary ===
==== Declared ====
- James H. Duffee

==== Results ====
Democratic primary results
Party	Candidate	Votes	%
Democratic	James H. Duffee	3,182	100.0
Total votes		3,182	100.0

=== General election ===
==== Results ====
General election results
Party	Candidate	Votes	%
Republican	Levi Dean	39,278	70.4
Democratic	James H. Duffee	16,485	29.6
Total votes		55,763	100.0

== District 72 ==
=== Republican primary ===
==== Declared ====
- Gail Pavliga, incumbent state representative
- Heidi Workman

==== Endorsements ====
Gail Pavliga

Organizations

- Ohio Right to Life

==== Results ====
Republican primary results
Party	Candidate	Votes	%
Republican	Heidi Workman	7,627	61.4
Republican	Gail Pavliga (incumbent)	4,796	38.6
Total votes		12,423	100.0

=== Democratic primary ===
==== Declared ====
- Nathaniel Adams

==== Results ====
Democratic primary results
Party	Candidate	Votes	%
Democratic	Nathaniel Adams	5,503	100.0
Total votes		5,503	100.0

=== General election ===
==== Results ====
General election results
Party	Candidate	Votes	%
Democratic	Nathaniel Adams	23,657	41.3
Republican	Heidi Workman	33,607	58.7
Total votes		57,264	100.0

== District 73 ==
=== Republican primary ===
==== Declared ====
- Jeff LaRe, incumbent state representative
- Mike Tussey, Baltimore chief of police

==== Withdrawn ====
- Austin Beigel

==== Results ====
Republican primary results
Party	Candidate	Votes	%
Republican	Jeff LaRe (incumbent)	6,001	55.2
Republican	Mike Tussey	4,876	44.8
Total votes		10,877	100.0

=== Democratic primary ===
==== Declared ====
- Michael Scarmack (write-in)

==== Results ====
Democratic primary results
Party	Candidate	Votes	%
Democratic	Michael Scarmack	211	100.0
Total votes		211	100.0

=== General election ===
==== Results ====
General election results
Party	Candidate	Votes	%
Democratic	Michael Scarmack	24,595	39.0
Republican	Jeff LaRe (incumbent)	38,390	61.0
Total votes		62,985	100.0

== District 74 ==
=== Republican primary ===
==== Declared ====
- Bernard Willis, incumbent state representative

==== Results ====
Republican primary results
Party	Candidate	Votes	%
Republican	Bernard Willis (incumbent)	9,039	100.0
Total votes		9,039	100.0

=== Democratic primary ===
==== Declared ====
- Derek I. Alvarado

==== Results ====
Democratic primary results
Party	Candidate	Votes	%
Democratic	Derek I. Alvarado	3,540	100.0
Total votes		3,540	100.0

=== General election ===
==== Results ====
General election results
Party	Candidate	Votes	%
Democratic	Derek I. Alvarado	17,577	35.8
Republican	Bernard Willis (incumbent)	31,515	64.2
Total votes		49,092	100.0

== District 75 ==
=== Republican primary ===
==== Declared ====
- Sally Culling, former Nottingham city councilor
- Haraz Ghanbari, incumbent state representative

==== Endorsements ====
Sally Culling

State senators

- Theresa Gavarone, SD-02 (2019–present)

State representatives

- Josh Williams, HD-41 (2023–present)

Organizations

- Americans for Prosperity
- Ohio Chamber of Commerce
Haraz Ghanbari

Organizations

- Ohio Fraternal Order of Police
- Ohio Right to Life

==== Results ====
Republican primary results
Party	Candidate	Votes	%
Republican	Haraz Ghanbari (incumbent)	6,580	53.6
Republican	Sally Culling	5,697	46.4
Total votes		12,277	100.0

=== Democratic primary ===
==== Declared ====
- Jan K. Materni

==== Results ====
Democratic primary results
Party	Candidate	Votes	%
Democratic	Jan K. Materni	4,872	100.0
Total votes		4,872	100.0

=== General election ===
==== Results ====
General election results
Party	Candidate	Votes	%
Republican	Haraz Ghanbari (incumbent)	32,907	59.4
Democratic	Jan K. Materni	22,490	40.6
Total votes		55,397	100.0

== District 76 ==
=== Republican primary ===
==== Potential ====
- Marilyn John, incumbent state representative

==== Results ====
Republican primary results
Party	Candidate	Votes	%
Republican	Marilyn John (incumbent)	12,028	100.0
Total votes		12,028	100.0

=== Democratic primary ===
==== Declared ====
- Alomar Davenport, Mansfield city councilor

==== Results ====
Democratic primary results
Party	Candidate	Votes	%
Democratic	Alomar Davenport	3,286	100.0
Total votes		3,286	100.0

=== General election ===
==== Results ====
General election results
Party	Candidate	Votes	%
Democratic	Alomar Davenport	15,738	28.1
Republican	Marilyn John (incumbent)	40,352	71.9
Independent	Tim Grady (write-in)	11	0.0
Total votes		56,101	100.0

== District 77 ==
=== Republican primary ===
==== Declared ====
- Bill Albright
- Meredith Craig
- Dennis Finley, former mayor of Dalton
- Frank Grande
- Josh Hlavaty

==== Endorsements ====
Bill Albright

Organizations

- Ohio Right to Life
Meredith Craig

Organizations

- Ohio Right to Life
Josh Hlavaty

Organizations

- Ohio Right to Life

==== Results ====
Republican primary results
Party	Candidate	Votes	%
Republican	Meredith Craig	4,524	35.1
Republican	Josh Hlavaty	4,424	34.3
Republican	Bill Albright	1,789	13.9
Republican	Dennis Finley	1,283	10.0
Republican	Frank Grande	867	6.7
Total votes		12,887	100.0

=== Democratic primary ===
==== Declared ====
- Mark D. Gooch

==== Results ====
Democratic primary results
Party	Candidate	Votes	%
Democratic	Mark D. Gooch	2,780	100.0
Total votes		2,780	100.0

=== General election ===
==== Results ====
General election results
Party	Candidate	Votes	%
Republican	Meredith Craig	35,555	69.3
Democratic	Mark D. Gooch	15,729	30.7
Total votes		51,284	100.0

== District 78 ==
=== Republican primary ===
==== Declared ====
- Matt Huffman, 96th president of the Ohio Senate (2021–present) and state senator from the 12th district (2017–present)

==== Failed to qualify ====
- Chris Walther

==== Declined ====
- Susan Manchester, incumbent state representative (running for Ohio Senate)

==== Results ====
Republican primary results
Party	Candidate	Votes	%
Republican	Matt Huffman	10,889	100.0
Total votes		10,889	100.0

=== Democratic primary ===
==== Failed to qualify ====
- Dylan Gross

=== General election ===
==== Results ====
General election results
Party	Candidate	Votes	%
Republican	Matt Huffman	41,369	100.0
Total votes		41,369	100.0

== District 79 ==
=== Republican primary ===
==== Declared ====
- Monica Robb Blasdel, incumbent state representative

==== Results ====
Republican primary results
Party	Candidate	Votes	%
Republican	Monica Robb Blasdel (incumbent)	12,755	100.0
Total votes		12,755	100.0

=== Democratic primary ===
==== Declared ====
- Dan Votaw

==== Results ====
Democratic primary results
Party	Candidate	Votes	%
Democratic	Dan Votaw	3,182	100.0
Total votes		3,182	100.0

=== General election ===
==== Results ====
General election results
Party	Candidate	Votes	%
Democratic	Dan Votaw	14,122	25.4
Republican	Monica Robb Blasdel (incumbent)	41,502	74.6
Total votes		55,624	100.0

== District 80 ==
=== Republican primary ===
==== Declared ====
- Johnathan Newman, pastor

==== Withdrawn ====
- Jena Powell, incumbent state representative

==== Results ====
Republican primary results
Party	Candidate	Votes	%
Republican	Johnathan Newman	14,572	100.0
Total votes		14,572	100.0

=== Democratic primary ===
==== Declared ====
- Melissa VanDyke

==== Results ====
Democratic primary results
Party	Candidate	Votes	%
Democratic	Melissa VanDyke	2,609	100.0
Total votes		2,609	100.0

=== General election ===
==== Results ====
General election results
Party	Candidate	Votes	%
Democratic	Melissa VanDyke	16,394	25.1
Republican	Johnathan Newman	48,868	74.9
Total votes		65,262	100.0

== District 81 ==
=== Republican primary ===
==== Declared ====
- Jim Hoops, incumbent state representative

==== Results ====
Republican primary results
Party	Candidate	Votes	%
Republican	Jim Hoops (incumbent)	13,614	100.0
Total votes		13,614	100.0

=== Democratic primary ===
==== Declared ====
- Gene Redinger (write-in)

==== Results ====
Democratic primary results
Party	Candidate	Votes	%
Democratic	Gene Redinger	79	100.0
Total votes		79	100.0

=== General election ===
==== Results ====
General election results
Party	Candidate	Votes	%
Democratic	Gene Redinger	13,046	23.0
Republican	Jim Hoops (incumbent)	43,757	77.0
Total votes		56,803	100.0

== District 82 ==
=== Republican primary ===
==== Declared ====
- Roy Klopfenstein, incumbent state representative

==== Results ====
Republican primary results
Party	Candidate	Votes	%
Republican	Roy Klopfenstein (incumbent)	12,026	100.0
Total votes		12,026	100.0

=== Democratic primary ===
==== Declared ====
- Magdalene Markward

==== Results ====
Democratic primary results
Party	Candidate	Votes	%
Democratic	Magdalene Markward	1,951	100.0
Total votes		1,951	100.0

=== General election ===
==== Results ====
General election results
Party	Candidate	Votes	%
Democratic	Magdalene Markward	11,825	20.6
Republican	Roy Klopfenstein (incumbent)	45,616	79.4
Total votes		57,441	100.0

== District 83 ==
=== Republican primary ===
==== Declared ====
- Jon Cross, incumbent state representative
- Ty Mathews

==== Endorsements ====
Jon Cross

Organizations

- National Federation of Independent Business
- Ohio Right to Life
Ty Mathews

Organizations

- Americans for Prosperity

==== Results ====
Republican primary results
Party	Candidate	Votes	%
Republican	Ty Mathews	12,819	65.9
Republican	Jon Cross (incumbent)	6,647	34.1
Total votes		19,466	100.0

=== Democratic primary ===
==== Declared ====
- Sheila M. Coressel

==== Results ====
Democratic primary results
Party	Candidate	Votes	%
Democratic	Sheila M. Coressel	2,432	100.0
Total votes		2,432	100.0

=== General election ===
==== Results ====
General election results
Party	Candidate	Votes	%
Democratic	Sheila M. Coressel	14,404	24.9
Republican	Ty Mathews	43,407	75.1
Total votes		57,811	100.0

== District 84 ==
=== Republican primary ===
==== Declared ====
- Angela King, incumbent state representative

==== Results ====
Republican primary results
Party	Candidate	Votes	%
Republican	Angela King (incumbent)	14,164	100.0
Total votes		14,164	100.0

=== Democratic primary ===
==== Declared ====
- Arienne Childrey, LGBT activist
- Heather Schmidt (write-in)

==== Results ====
Democratic primary results
Party	Candidate	Votes	%
Democratic	Arienne Childrey	1,558	99.1
Democratic	Heather Schmidt (write-in)	15	0.9
Total votes		1,573	100.0

=== General election ===
==== Results ====
General election results
Party	Candidate	Votes	%
Democratic	Arienne Childrey	9,410	15.7
Republican	Angela King (incumbent)	50,246	84.3
Total votes		59,836	100.0

== District 85 ==
=== Republican primary ===
==== Declared ====
- Tim Barhorst, incumbent state representative

==== Results ====
Republican primary results
Party	Candidate	Votes	%
Republican	Tim Barhorst (incumbent)	14,069	100.0
Total votes		14,069	100.0

=== Democratic primary ===
==== Declared ====
- Victoria Maddox

==== Results ====
Democratic primary results
Party	Candidate	Votes	%
Democratic	Victoria Maddox	2,163	100.0
Total votes		2,163	100.0

=== General election ===
==== Results ====
General election results
Party	Candidate	Votes	%
Democratic	Victoria Maddox	11,551	19.9
Republican	Tim Barhorst (incumbent)	46,524	80.1
Total votes		58,075	100.0

== District 86 ==
=== Republican primary ===
==== Declared ====
- Wezlynn Davis, Jerome Township trustee
- Tracy Richardson, incumbent state representative

==== Endorsements ====
Wezlynn Davis

Organizations

- Americans for Prosperity
Tracy Richardson

Organizations

- Ohio Right to Life

==== Results ====
Republican primary results
Party	Candidate	Votes	%
Republican	Tracy Richardson (incumbent)	8,024	59.8
Republican	Wezlynn Davis	5,392	40.2
Total votes		13,416	100.0

=== Democratic primary ===
==== Declared ====
- Lesley Verbus

==== Results ====
Democratic primary results
Party	Candidate	Votes	%
Democratic	Lesley Verbus	2,518	100.0
Total votes		2,518	100.0

=== General election ===
==== Results ====
General election results
Party	Candidate	Votes	%
Democratic	Lesley Verbus	16,927	31.1
Republican	Tracy Richardson (incumbent)	37,571	68.9
Total votes		54,498	100.0

== District 87 ==
=== Republican primary ===
==== Declared ====
- Riordan McClain, incumbent state representative

==== Results ====
Republican primary results
Party	Candidate	Votes	%
Republican	Riordan McClain (incumbent)	12,273	100.0
Total votes		12,273	100.0

=== Democratic primary ===
==== Declared ====
- Craig Swartz, nominee for Ohio's 5th congressional district in 2022

==== Results ====
Democratic primary results
Party	Candidate	Votes	%
Democratic	Craig Swartz	2,202	100.0
Total votes		2,202	100.0

=== General election ===
==== Results ====
General election results
Party	Candidate	Votes	%
Democratic	Craig Swartz	13,205	23.5
Republican	Riordan McClain (incumbent)	42,897	76.5
Total votes		56,102	100.0

== District 88 ==
=== Republican primary ===
==== Declared ====
- Gary Click, incumbent state representative

==== Results ====
Republican primary results
Party	Candidate	Votes	%
Republican	Gary Click (incumbent)	10,625	100.0
Total votes		10,625	100.0

=== Democratic primary ===
==== Declared ====
- Diane Selvey

==== Results ====
Democratic primary results
Party	Candidate	Votes	%
Democratic	Diane Selvey	3,361	100.0
Total votes		3,361	100.0

=== General election ===
==== Results ====
General election results
Party	Candidate	Votes	%
Democratic	Diane Selvey	17,762	33.4
Republican	Gary Click (incumbent)	35,367	66.6
Total votes		53,129	100.0

== District 89 ==
=== Republican primary ===
==== Declared ====
- Steve Kraus, former state representative from the 89th district (2015)
- D. J. Swearingen, incumbent state representative

==== Endorsements ====
D. J. Swearingen

Organizations

- Ohio Right to Life

==== Results ====
Republican primary results
Party	Candidate	Votes	%
Republican	D. J. Swearingen (incumbent)	7,145	65.2
Republican	Steve Kraus	3,816	34.8
Total votes		10,961	100.0

=== Democratic primary ===
==== Declared ====
- Alisha W. Roshong, attorney

==== Results ====
Democratic primary results
Party	Candidate	Votes	%
Democratic	Alisha W. Roshong	4,542	100.0
Total votes		4,542	100.0

=== General election ===
==== Results ====
General election results
Party	Candidate	Votes	%
Democratic	Alisha W. Roshong	24,762	41.3
Republican	D. J. Swearingen (incumbent)	35,148	58.7
Total votes		59,910	100.0

== District 90 ==
=== Republican primary ===
==== Declared ====
- Gina Collinsworth, community leader and economic development advocate
- Justin Pizzulli, incumbent state representative
- Timothy Wheeler, businessman

==== Endorsements ====
Gina Collinsworth

Organizations

- Americans for Prosperity
- Brown County Republican Party
Justin Pizzulli

Organizations

- Adams County Republican Party
- Ohio Right to Life
- Scioto County Republican Party

==== Results ====
Republican primary results
Party	Candidate	Votes	%
Republican	Justin Pizzulli (incumbent)	7,656	48.0
Republican	Gina Collinsworth	5,260	33.0
Republican	Timothy Wheeler	3,035	19.0
Total votes		15,951	100.0

=== Democratic primary ===
==== Declared ====
- Kate Nunnelley

==== Results ====
Democratic primary results
Party	Candidate	Votes	%
Democratic	Kate Nunnelley	2,385	100.0
Total votes		2,385	100.0

=== General election ===
==== Results ====
General election results
Party	Candidate	Votes	%
Democratic	Kate Nunnelley	11,314	23.3
Republican	Justin Pizzulli (incumbent)	37,420	76.7
Total votes		48,734	100.0

== District 91 ==
=== Republican primary ===
==== Declared ====
- Bob Peterson, incumbent state representative

==== Results ====
Republican primary results
Party	Candidate	Votes	%
Republican	Bob Peterson (incumbent)	10,967	100.0
Total votes		10,967	100.0

=== Democratic primary ===
==== Declared ====
- Ellen Yvette Clark, nurse

==== Results ====
Democratic primary results
Party	Candidate	Votes	%
Democratic	Ellen Yvette Clark	1,916	100.0
Total votes		1,916	100.0

=== General election ===
==== Results ====
General election results
Party	Candidate	Votes	%
Democratic	Ellen Yvette Clark	9,932	20.3
Republican	Bob Peterson (incumbent)	39,096	79.7
Total votes		49,028	100.0

== District 92 ==
=== Republican primary ===
==== Declared ====
- Mark Johnson, incumbent state representative

==== Results ====
Republican primary results
Party	Candidate	Votes	%
Republican	Mark Johnson (incumbent)	9,712	100.0
Total votes		9,712	100.0

=== Democratic primary ===
==== Declared ====
- Arthur Donald Beatty

==== Results ====
Democratic primary results
Party	Candidate	Votes	%
Democratic	Arthur Donald Beatty	3,168	100.0
Total votes		3,168	100.0

=== General election ===
==== Results ====
General election results
Party	Candidate	Votes	%
Democratic	Arthur Donald Beatty	13,966	28.4
Republican	Mark Johnson (incumbent)	35,181	71.6
Total votes		49,147	100.0

== District 93 ==
=== Republican primary ===
==== Declared ====
- Jason Stephens, incumbent state representative

==== Results ====
Republican primary results
Party	Candidate	Votes	%
Republican	Jason Stephens (incumbent)	12,182	100.0
Total votes		12,182	100.0

=== General election ===
==== Results ====
General election results
Party	Candidate	Votes	%
Republican	Jason Stephens	43,225	100.0
Total votes		43,225	100.0

== District 94 ==
=== Republican primary ===
==== Declared ====
- Kevin Ritter, Washington County Commission president
- Shannon Walker

==== Endorsements ====
Kevin Ritter

Organizations

- Americans for Prosperity
- Ohio Right to Life

==== Results ====
Republican primary results
Party	Candidate	Votes	%
Republican	Kevin Ritter	9,620	62.8
Republican	Shannon Walker	5,699	37.2
Total votes		15,319	100.0

=== Democratic primary ===
==== Declared ====
- Wenda Sheard

==== Results ====
Democratic primary results
Party	Candidate	Votes	%
Democratic	Wenda Sheard	3,980	100.0
Total votes		3,980	100.0

=== General election ===
==== Results ====
General election results
Party	Candidate	Votes	%
Democratic	Wenda Sheard	16,568	30.6
Republican	Kevin Ritter	37,516	69.4
Independent	Andrea Neutzling (write-in)	10	0.0
Total votes		54,094	100.0

== District 95 ==
=== Republican primary ===
==== Declared ====
- Don Jones, incumbent state representative
- Nelson E. Roe

==== Endorsements ====
Don Jones

Organizations

- National Federation of Independent Business
- Ohio Right to Life

==== Results ====
Republican primary results
Party	Candidate	Votes	%
Republican	Don Jones (incumbent)	8,145	66.1
Republican	Nelson E. Roe	4,170	33.9
Total votes		12,315	100.0

=== Democratic primary ===
==== Declared ====
- Micah McCarey, Athens city councilman

==== Withdrew after primary election ====
- Lish Greiner

==== Results ====
Democratic primary results
Party	Candidate	Votes	%
Democratic	Lish Greiner	4,059	100.0
Total votes		4,059	100.0

=== General election ===
==== Results ====
General election results
Party	Candidate	Votes	%
Democratic	Micah McCarey	16,020	32.7
Republican	Don Jones (incumbent)	32,958	67.3
Total votes		48,978	100.0

== District 96 ==
=== Republican primary ===
==== Declared ====
- Ron Ferguson, incumbent state representative

==== Results ====
Republican primary results
Party	Candidate	Votes	%
Republican	Ron Ferguson (incumbent)	9,851	100.0
Total votes		9,851	100.0

=== General election ===
==== Results ====
General election results
Party	Candidate	Votes	%
Republican	Ron Ferguson (incumbent)	41,434	100.0
Total votes		41,434	100.0

== District 97 ==
=== Republican primary ===
==== Declared ====
- Adam Holmes, incumbent state representative

==== Results ====
Republican primary results
Party	Candidate	Votes	%
Republican	Adam Holmes (incumbent)	9,135	100.0
Total votes		9,135	100.0

=== Independents ===
- Scott Wilson

=== General election ===
==== Results ====
General election results
Party	Candidate	Votes	%
Republican	Adam Holmes (incumbent)	35,081	74.3
Independent	Scott Wilson	12,120	25.7
Total votes		47,201	100.0

== District 98 ==
=== Republican primary ===
==== Declared ====
- Mark Hiner
- Brandon Lape, IT professional, candidate for Ohio's 7th congressional district in 2020 and Ohio's 12th congressional district in 2022
- Scott Pullins, attorney and candidate for the 98th district in 2022

==== Withdrawn ====
- Amber Keener, Mount Vernon city councilor (running for Knox County treasurer)

==== Endorsements ====
Mark Hiner

Organizations

- Americans for Prosperity
- Knox County Republican Party

==== Results ====
Republican primary results
Party	Candidate	Votes	%
Republican	Mark Hiner	7,596	54.9
Republican	Scott Pullins	3,813	27.6
Republican	Brandon Lape	2,424	17.5
Total votes		13,833	100.0

=== Democratic primary ===
==== Declared ====
- Annie Homstad

==== Results ====
Democratic primary results
Party	Candidate	Votes	%
Democratic	Annie Homstad	2,243	100.0
Total votes		2,243	100.0

=== General election ===
==== Results ====
General election results
Party	Candidate	Votes	%
Democratic	Annie Homstad	11,557	24.5
Republican	Mark Hiner	35,572	75.5
Total votes		47,219	100.0

== District 99 ==
=== Republican primary ===
==== Declared ====
- Sarah Fowler Arthur, incumbent state representative

==== Results ====
Republican primary results
Party	Candidate	Votes	%
Republican	Sarah Fowler Arthur (incumbent)	12,202	100.0
Total votes		12,202	100.0

=== Democratic primary ===
==== Declared ====
- Louis Murphy

==== Results ====
Democratic primary results
Party	Candidate	Votes	%
Democratic	Louis Murphy	4,419	100.0
Total votes		4,419	100.0

=== Independents ===
- Justin Tjaden, attorney (failed to qualify)

=== General election ===
==== Results ====
General election results
Party	Candidate	Votes	%
Democratic	Louis Murphy	20,986	35.5
Republican	Sarah Fowler Arthur (incumbent)	38,184	64.5
Total votes		59,170	100.0

== See also ==
- 2024 Ohio elections
- List of Ohio state legislatures
