= Rose Lounsbury =

American politician

Member-elect of the Ohio House of Representatives from the 36th district
- Assuming office January 1, 2027
- Succeeding: Andrea White

Personal details
- Party: Democratic
- Education: Western Michigan University; Miami University
- Website: Official website Campaign website

Rose Lounsbury is an American politician who is the member-elect for the 36th district of the Ohio House of Representatives, succeeding to the office on January 1, 2027. She was elected in the 2026 election. She was an unsuccessful candidate in 2024. She is an author and professional organizer. She has given Ted talks on minimalism and decluttering.
