= Michele Grim =

American politician

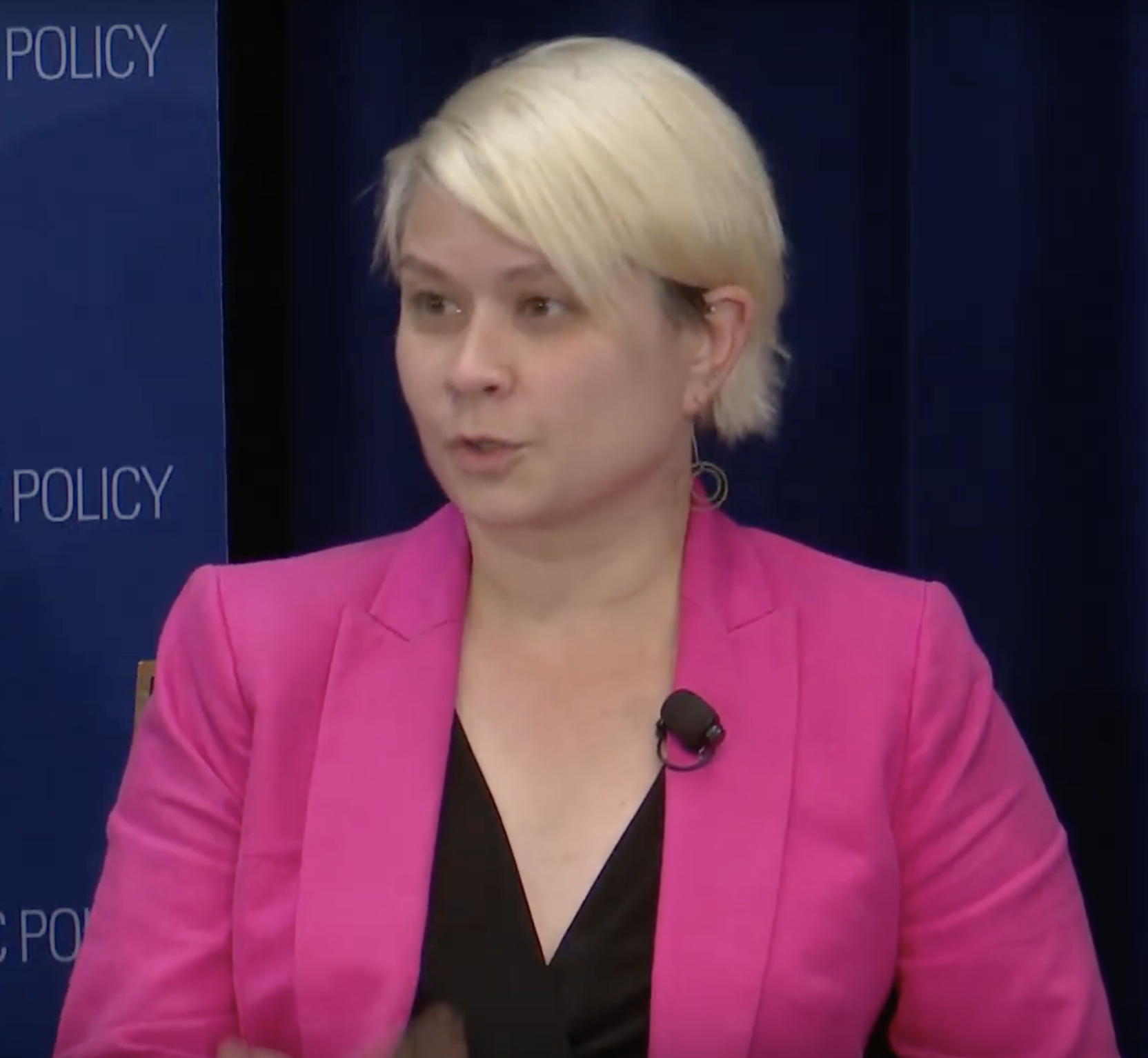
- Grim speaking at a University of Michigan Gerald R. Ford School of Public Policy event, September 2024

Member of the Ohio House of Representatives from the 43rd district
- Incumbent
- Assumed office January 1, 2023
- Preceded by: Rodney Creech

Personal details
- Party: Democratic
- Education: University of Toledo
- Occupation: Politician

Michele Grim serves as a member of the Ohio House of Representatives for the 43rd District, affiliating with the Democratic Party, a position she has held since 2023, where she is the minority assistant whip.

A native of Ashland, Ohio, Grim earned a bachelor’s degree in women’s & gender studies and a master’s in public health from the University of Toledo, and then a doctorate from Northeastern. She has served in public health roles in government, university research, and with nonprofit health care organizations. She also served as an at-large member of the Toledo City Council prior to her election to the state house.

Grim was first elected to the Ohio House of Representatives in 2022 to represent the 43rd district, which includes part of Lucas County. She serves as ranking member of the House Transportation Committee and is a member of the Finance, Health, and Arts, Athletics, & Tourism Committees.
