= Mark Sigrist =

American politician

Member of the Ohio House of Representatives from the 10th district
- Incumbent
- Assumed office January 1, 2025
- Preceded by: David Dobos

Personal details
- Born: Columbus, Ohio
- Party: Democratic
- Website: www.marksigrist.com

Mark Sigrist is an American politician serving as a member of the Ohio House of Representatives from the 10th district. A Democrat, he was elected in the 2024 Ohio House of Representatives election, defeating Republican Brian Garvine.

A native of Grove City, Sigrist graduated from Ohio University with a bachelor's degree in accounting and passed the CPA exam. Before entering public service, he worked for Honda's North America division, initially living in Japan while he helped establish Honda's first expatriate program for North American associates and their families.

Prior to being elected to the state house, Sigrist also served as an at-large member of the Grove City Council from 2022 to 2024. In the Ohio House, he represents a district that includes Grove City, German Village, Urbancrest, Lockbourne, and parts of Columbus. Sigrist is a member of the Development, Small Business, and Ways and Means committees.
