= Lauren McNally =

American politician

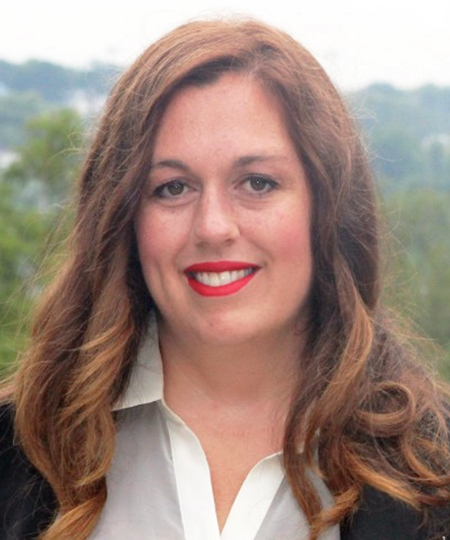

Member of the Ohio House of Representatives from the 58th district
- Incumbent
- Assumed office January 1, 2023
- Preceded by: Alessandro Cutrona

Personal details
- Party: Democratic
- Education: Ohio State University (BA)
- Profession: Politician

Lauren McNally is an American politician who has served in the Ohio House of Representatives since 2023. A member of the Democratic Party, she represents the 58th district, which includes part of Mahoning County.

== Career ==
McNally is from Youngstown, Ohio. She graduated from Ursuline High School and went on to earn a bachelor's degree in political science and journalism from Ohio State University in 2008. She pursued a career in journalism before entering public service. From 2016 to 2022, she was a member of the Youngstown City Council, prior to her election to the Ohio House of Representatives.

McNally first ran to represent the 59th District in the 2022 Ohio House of Representatives election, where she won with 40% of the vote. After being redistricted, McNally was reelected to represent the 58th District in 2024 with 58% of the vote. In 2025, she announced her intention to run for an open seat on the Mahoning County, Ohio board of commissioners.

McNally opposed Republican-led efforts to override Governor Mike DeWine's vetoes of property tax reform efforts in the state's biennial operating budget, citing concerns for school districts and local government funding.

In October 2025, McNally introduced legislation to abolish Academic Distress Commissions in Ohio, citing the failure of the state takeover to improve student academic success in Youngstown City Schools.

On January 22, 2026, McNally authored a letter to the Public Utilities Commission of Ohio, urging them to reject a request from FirstEnergy to allow for longer power outages.

=== Committee assignments ===
As of June 2026, McNally serves on the following committees in the Ohio House.

- Commerce and Labor (ranking member)
- Arts, Athletics, and Tourism
- Natural Resources
