= Beth Lear =

American politician

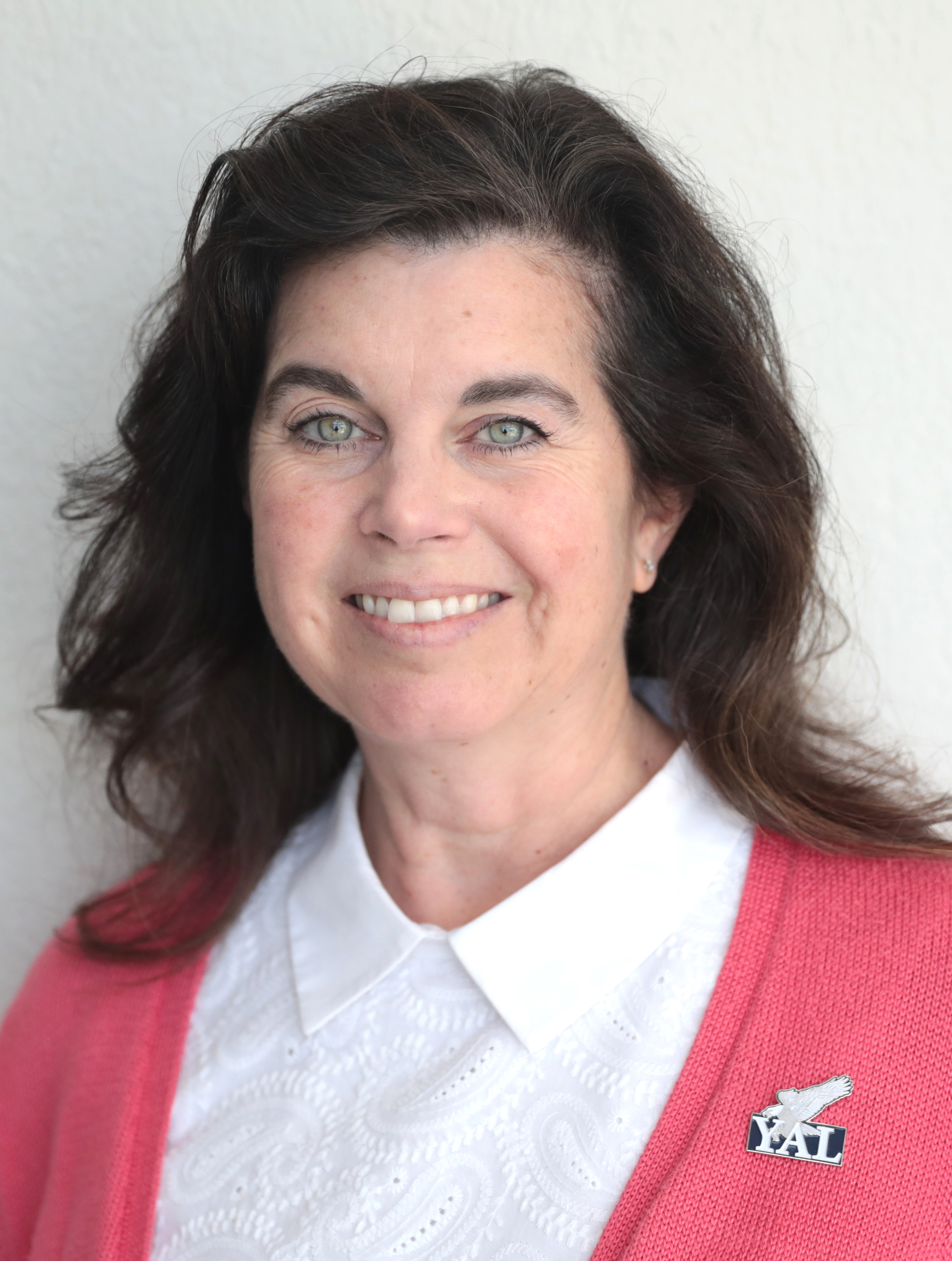
- Lear in 2022

Member of the Ohio House of Representatives from the 61st district
- Incumbent
- Assumed office January 1, 2023
- Preceded by: Jamie Callender

Personal details
- Born: 1966 or 1967 (age 59–60)
- Party: Republican
- Spouse: Jeffery Lear (m. 1994)
- Children: 2
- Education: Olentangy High School; Ohio State University

Military service
- Military career: Ohio Air National Guard

Beth Lear (born 1966/1967) is an American politician who has served in the Ohio House of Representatives from the 61st district since 2023.

She is a veteran, and a graduate of Olentangy High School and Ohio State University.

== Political positions ==
=== Transgender rights ===
In January 2024, Lear co-sponsored a bill which would ban transgender people from bathrooms that align with their gender identity in schools. During the hearing for the bill, she compared identifying as transgender to identifying as a bird.
