= Justin Pizzulli =

American politician

Justin Pizzuli

Member of the Ohio House of Representatives from the 90th district
- Incumbent
- Assumed office May 11, 2023
- Preceded by: Brian Baldridge

Personal details
- Party: Republican

Justin Pizzuli is an American politician who has served in the Ohio House of Representatives from the 90th district since 2023.

Pizzulli is a graduate of Green High School in Franklin Furnace, Ohio. Pizzuli earned his bachelor's degree from Shawnee State, and a masters from Marshall University. He worked as a realtor in the Ironton and Wheelersburg areas and as a commercial freight-train conductor in Portsmouth, and was active in local Republican politics as a Scioto County Republican Party committee member.

Pizzulli was appointed to the Ohio House of Representatives on May 11, 2023, to serve out the remaining term of Brian Baldridge, who had resigned to lead the Ohio Department of Agriculture. Pizzulli's district includes Scioto and Adams counties and part of Brown County. He was elected to his first full term in 2024.

== Committee assignments ==
- As of June 2026, Pizzulli serves on the following committees in the Ohio House.
- Financial Institutions (vice chair)
- Commerce and Labor
- Government Oversight
- Transportation
