= Elgin Rogers Jr. =

American politician

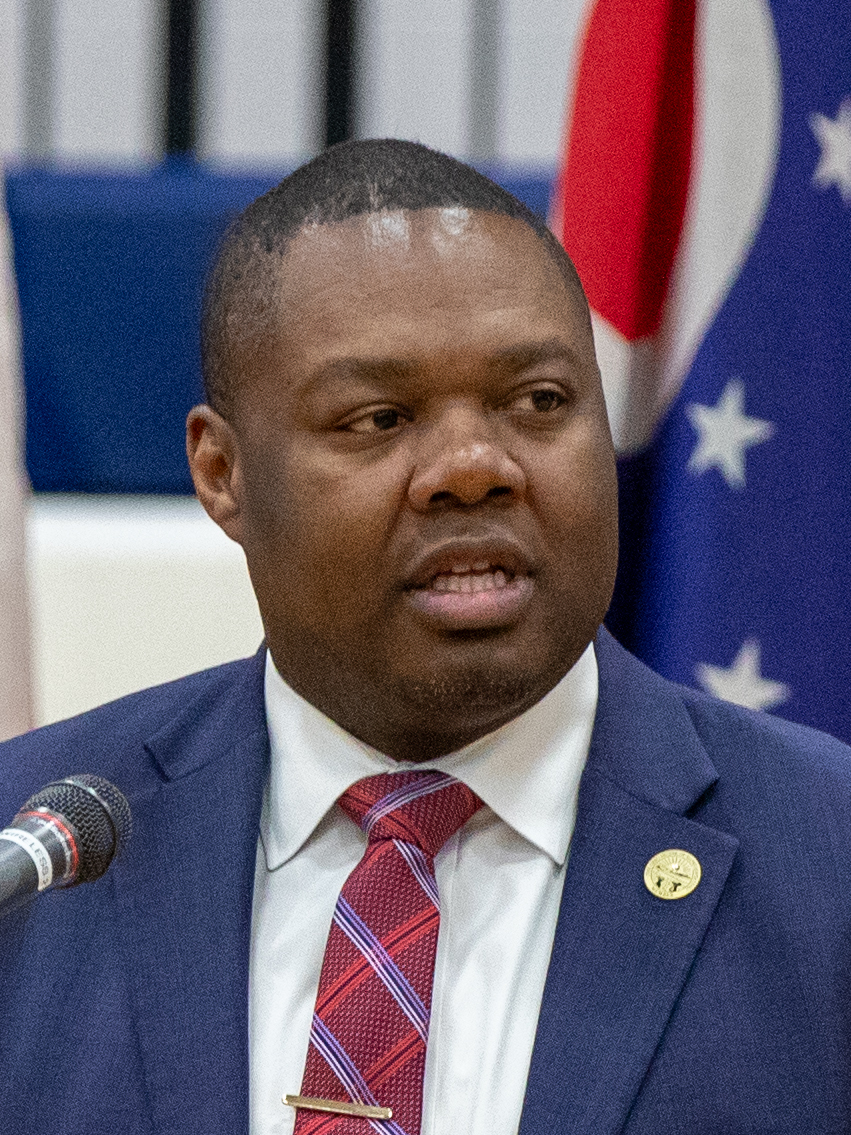
- Rogers in 2024

Member of the Ohio House of Representatives from the 44th district
- Incumbent
- Assumed office January 1, 2023
- Preceded by: Paula Hicks-Hudson

Personal details
- Born: Toledo, Ohio
- Party: Democratic

Elgin Rogers Jr. is an American politician who has served in the Ohio House of Representatives from the 44th district since 2023.

He was appointed to replace Paula Hicks-Hudson.

== Early life and education ==
He holds a Bachelor of Arts degree from Kent State University in Kent Ohio and a Master of Arts degree from Indiana University Bloomington.

Rogers grew up in Toledo, and graduated from Jesup W. Scott High School and earned a bachelor’s degree in political science from Kent State University, and a master’s from Indiana University Bloomington. Prior to his appointment to the state house, Rogers taught American government and political science in university and worked for County government, including as director of departments in the Lucas County Auditor’s office and as an administrator with the Lucas County Board of Commissioners.

== Politics ==
Rogers was first appointed to the Ohio House of Representatives in November 2022 after the vacancy of District 44. In 2024, Rogers was reelected to the House from District 42, which includes Toledo, Oregon, and Jerusalem Township in Lucas County. Rogers is the ranking member of the Natural Resources Committee, and a member of the Energy, Natural Resources, Transportation, and Ways and Means committees.

== Legal Problems ==
Ohio State Rep. Elgin Rogers Jr. was arrested early Thursday morning by Clay Township police according to the Ottawa County Sheriff's Office, following a late-night traffic stop that led to multiple charges.

Charges Include; improper handling of a firearm, driving too slow, and OVWI
