= Andrea White (politician) =

American politician

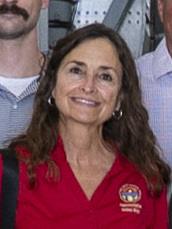
- White in 2025

Member of the Ohio House of Representatives from the 36th district
- Incumbent
- Assumed office January 1, 2023
- Preceded by: Bob Young

Member of the Ohio House of Representatives from the 41st district
- In office 2021–2022
- Preceded by: James Butler
- Succeeded by: Josh Williams

Personal details
- Party: Republican
- Spouse: John White
- Children: 3 daughters, 2 sons In-law
- Education: Bachelor's degree
- Alma mater: Wright State University

Andrea White is a Republican member of the Ohio House of Representatives representing the 36th district. She was elected in 2020, defeating Democrat Cate Berger with 56% of the vote.

== Biography ==
White graduated from Centerville High School and got her Bachelor's Degree at Wright State University. She has 3 daughters, 2 sons In-law and four grandchildren.
