= Tim Barhorst =

American politician

Member of the Ohio House of Representatives from the 85th district
- Incumbent
- Assumed office January 3, 2023
- Preceded by: Nino Vitale

Personal details
- Party: Republican
- Children: 1
- Education: Wright State University

Timothy N. Barhorst is an American politician. He serves as a Republican member for the 85th district of the Ohio House of Representatives.

== Life and career ==
Barhorst attended Wright State University.

In August 2022, Barhorst defeated Lilli Johnson Vitale and Rochiel Foulk in the Republican primary election for the 85th district of the Ohio House of Representatives. No candidate was nominated to challenge him in the general election. He succeeded Nino Vitale. He assumed office in 2023.

=== Committee assignments ===
As of June 2026, Barhorst serves on the following committees in the Ohio House.

- Medicaid (vice chair)
- Agriculture
- Health
- Insurance
