= Jack Daniels (Ohio politician) =

American politician

Member of the Ohio House of Representatives from the 32nd district
- Incumbent
- Assumed office April 24, 2024
- Preceded by: Bob Young

Personal details
- Party: Republican

John K. "Jack" Daniels is an American politician who has served in the Ohio House of Representatives from the 32nd district since April 24, 2024. He is a Republican.

In 2024, Daniels was appointed represent Ohio's 32nd State House District. He was sworn in on April 24, 2024. Daniels replaced Bob Young, who resigned on October 2, 2023, following arrests due to domestic violence and violating a protection order.

Daniels won the March 2024 primary election and became the Republican nominee for state representative, District 32, for the 2024 general election. He defeated challenger Mary Stormer 72% to 28%.

Daniels attended Kent State University and the University of Akron. He is the owner of a trucking company.
