= Darnell Brewer =

American politician

Member of the Ohio House of Representatives from the 22nd district
- Incumbent
- Assumed office January 1, 2025
- Preceded by: Juanita Brent

Member of the Ohio House of Representatives from the 18th district
- In office January 1, 2023 – December 31, 2024
- Preceded by: Kristin Boggs
- Succeeded by: Juanita Brent

Personal details
- Party: Democratic
- Education: Cleveland State University
- Occupation: Social service coordinator
- Profession: politician

Darnell Brewer has served since 2023 as a member of the Ohio House of Representatives, affiliating with the Democratic Party.
