= Josh Williams (politician) =

American politician (born 1984)

Member of the Ohio House of Representatives from the 44th district
- Incumbent
- Assumed office January 1, 2023
- Preceded by: Andrea White

Personal details
- Born: June 21, 1984 (age 42) Toledo, Ohio, U.S.
- Party: Republican
- Children: 1
- Education: University of Toledo (BS, JD)

Josh Williams (born 1984) is an American politician who is a Republican member of the Ohio House of Representatives representing the 44th district. He was first elected on November 8, 2022, and assumed office January 1, 2023. He is the first Black Republican to be elected to the Ohio House in 50 years and the first Black majority whip in Ohio's history.

Williams was a candidate for the U.S. House of Representatives in the 2026 election, unsuccessfully seeking the Republican nomination for Ohio's 9th congressional district.

== Biography ==
Williams dropped out of high school at the age of 18 when he became homeless. He later suffered a serious back injury after falling over thirty feet while working. This incident left him disabled for several years as he underwent numerous surgical procedures and years of physical therapy to learn how to walk again without assistance. After getting a GED, he started college at the age of 30, and five years later, he graduated from University of Toledo College of Law and became a practicing attorney, professor at Adrian College.

== Career ==
In July 2023, Williams was one of the lead sponsors of a bill that would ban drag performances from any venue where minors could be present. This bill was reintroduced in 2025, where it passed the House. It did not pass the Ohio Senate.

In January 2025, Williams was sworn in and serves as a whip for Ohio's 136th General Assembly. During the 136th General Assembly, Williams introduced over 100 pieces of legislation, setting a record for the most pieces of legislation introduced during one General Assembly in Ohio. These pieces of legislation included, but are not limited to: a bill to require local law enforcement to cooperate with the federal immigration enforcement; a bill to increase the penalty for human trafficking and trafficking-related crimes; a bill to require photo ID verification to access online pornography; and bills aimed at targeting the benefits cliff in Ohio’s welfare programs.

=== Committee assignments ===
- Energy
- Finance
- Judiciary
- Medicaid
- Rules and Reference
- Workforce and Higher Education
