= Bernard Willis =

American politician

Member of the Ohio House of Representatives from the 74th district
- Incumbent
- Assumed office January 3, 2023
- Preceded by: Bill Dean

Personal details
- Born: Louisville, Kentucky, U.S.
- Party: Republican
- Spouse: Lynne Willis
- Children: 3
- Education: Marion Military Institute; United States Air Force Academy; Embry–Riddle Aeronautical University

Bernard Willis is an American politician. He serves as a Republican member for the 74th district of the Ohio House of Representatives.

== Life and career ==
Willis was born in Louisville, Kentucky. He attended Marion Military Institute, United States Air Force Academy and Embry–Riddle Aeronautical University.

In 2022, Willis defeated Daniel Saks in the general election for the 74th district of the Ohio House of Representatives, winning 63 percent of the votes. He assumed office in 2023.

=== Committee assignments ===
As of June 2026, Willis serves on the following committees in the Ohio House.

- Transportation (chair)
- Finance
- Public Safety
- Veterans and Military Development
