= David Dobos =

American politician

Member of the Ohio House of Representatives from the 10th district
- In office January 1, 2023 – December 31, 2024
- Preceded by: Terrence Upchurch
- Succeeded by: Mark Sigrist

Personal details
- Party: Republican
- Occupation: Politician

David Dobos is an American politician. He served as a member of the Ohio House of Representatives for the 10th District, affiliating with the Republican Party, a position he held from 2023 to 2024.

Dobos claimed to have graduated from MIT, though later was proven to have not graduated. He chose not to run for reelection following the scandal, and now runs an ACT and SAT test preparation company.
