= Tex Fischer =

American politician

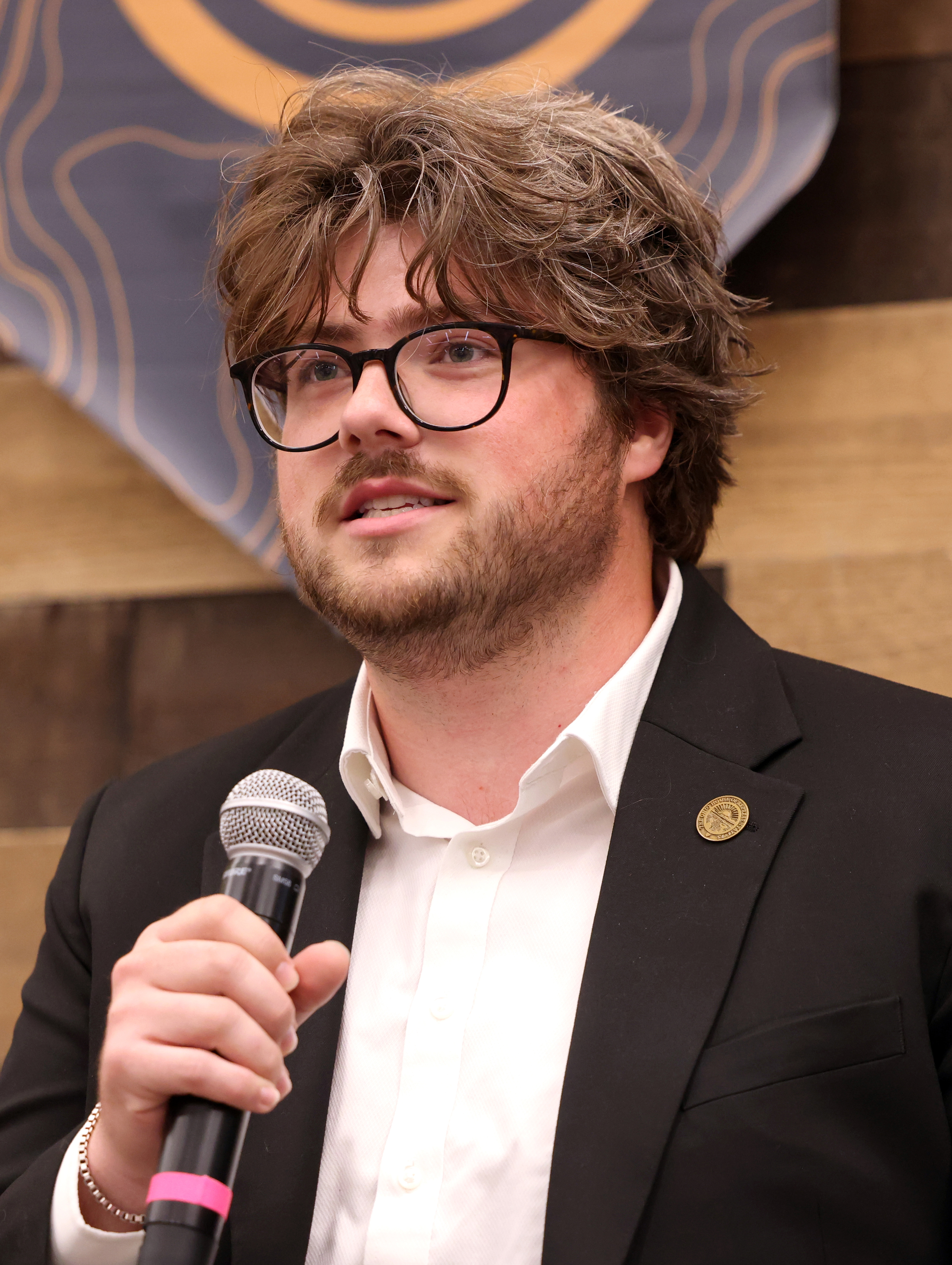
- Fischer in 2025

Member of the Ohio House of Representatives from the 59th district
- Incumbent
- Assumed office June 27, 2024
- Preceded by: Alessandro Cutrona

Personal details
- Born: Austin James Fischer; May 18, 1996 (age 30) Youngstown, Ohio, U.S.
- Party: Republican
- Committees: Natural Resources (Vice Chair), Energy, Commerce & Labor, Development
- Website: ohiohouse.gov/members/tex-fischer

Austin James Texford Fischer (born May 18, 1996) is an American politician who has served in the Ohio House of Representatives since 2024. A member of the Republican Party, he represents the 59th district, which includes parts of Columbiana County and Mahoning County.

== Career ==
Fischer was born Austin James Fischer in 1996 in Youngstown, Ohio, where he grew up. He changed his name to Austin James Texford Fischer in 2020.

Fischer is a political consultant who previously worked at Turning Point USA, the Ohio Republican Party, and the American Conservation Coalition. Fischer was appointed to the Ohio House of Representatives in 2024 to replace Alessandro Cutrona, who was elevated to the Ohio Senate.

In August of 2024, Fischer's ballot access was challenged by Democratic leaders, alleging that Ohio law requires candidates for office who changed their names within the last five years to disclose it on their nominating petitions. The law, which Fischer stated he supported reforming, had been used by some Republicans to disqualify transgender candidates. Ohio Secretary of State Frank LaRose ultimately ruled that Fischer would be permitted to appear on the ballot since he was not circulating nominating petitions, but was rather a ballot replacement for Cutrona.

Fischer won election to a full term in November 2024 with 57.1% of the vote.

== Legislation ==
In February of 2025, Fischer introduced HB 39 to exempt overtime wages from personal income tax, stating, "We need to create a culture that rewards hard work and allow our workers to keep more of what they earn."

Fischer introduced legislation in May of 2025 seeking to prevent certain college football games from starting at noon, in response to fan outcry about Ohio State football's noon start times for marquee games. The legislation was panned and has not had any committee hearings.

Fischer introduced a constitutional amendment to cap property taxes at 1.25% of home value in July of 2025. He has been supportive of the citizen-led effort to abolish all real estate taxes.

In October of 2025, Fischer opposed Governor Mike DeWine's attempt to eliminate hemp products from retail sale in Ohio through an executive order, citing the need for regulation instead of a ban.

Fischer is the author of Ohio's E-Verify law, HB 246, which passed the Ohio House and the Ohio Senate unanimously and was signed by Governor Mike DeWine on December 19, 2025.

In January 2026, Fischer introduced HB 662, legislation which would increase the penalty for interrupting a religious service from a first-degree misdemeanor to a fifth-degree felony. Fischer stated the legislation was in response to anti-ICE demonstrators protesting during a church service in St. Paul, Minnesota and is intended to deter individuals in Ohio from interrupting religious services on private property.
