= Angela King (Ohio politician) =

American politician

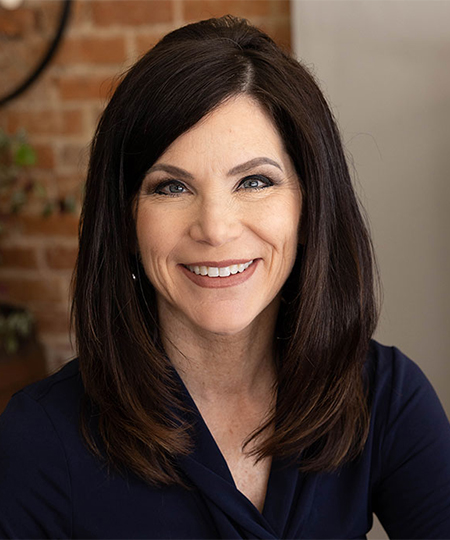

Member of the Ohio House of Representatives from the 84th district
- Incumbent
- Assumed office January 1, 2023
- Preceded by: Susan Manchester

Personal details
- Party: Republican
- Education: Wright State University

Angela N. King is an American politician who has served in the Ohio House of Representatives from the 84th district since 2023.

She is the eldest of five children and was raised on a farm. King and her husband, Mark, have two children and four grandchildren and are involved in their local church.

In April 2024, Ohio Representatives Angie King and Rodney Creech introduced legislation that would allow individuals from any political party to file a protest against a candidate in a primary election. This move came in response to a failed attempt by the Mercer County Republican Party Chair to disqualify Representative King's transgender opponent.

== Committee assignments ==
As of June 2026, King serves on the following committees in the Ohio House.

- Local Government (chair)
- Government Oversight
- Health
- Insurance
