= Derrick Hall (politician) =

American politician

- Hall in 2026

Member of the Ohio House of Representatives from the 34th district
- Incumbent
- Assumed office January 3, 2025

Personal details
- Party: Democratic
- Education: University of Akron (BS); Ohio State University (PharmD, JD, MBA); Harvard University (MS)
- Website: www.derrickhallforohio.com

Derrick Hall is an American politician and healthcare professional. He serves as a Democratic member for the 34th district of the Ohio House of Representatives since 2025. As State Representative for the Ohio 34th District, Hall represents Hudson, Stow, Tallmadge, Munroe Falls, Silver Lake, North Hill of Akron and Northwest Akron.

A resident of West Akron, Hall earned a Bachelor of Science in chemistry from the University of Akron and master's degrees from Ohio State University and Harvard Medical School. Before entering the state house, Hall worked in healthcare administration and served as president of the Akron Public Schools Board of Education. Hall succeeded Casey Weinstein, who ran for the Ohio Senate, in the House.

== Early life and education ==
Hall grew up in a single-parent household in Akron's public housing. His mother attained a college degree and became a teacher, earning a wage that enabled the family to move out of public housing and to provide basic needs. That experience shaped his outlook on how government can provide a critical safety net and how education can transform people's lives.

He earned a Bachelor of Science in chemistry at University of Akron and a Doctor of Pharmacy (2001–2005), Juris Doctor (2005–2009) and MBA (2007–2009) from The Ohio State University. Later, he earned his certificate in education finance from Georgetown University McCourt School of Public Policy (2020–2021) and a Master of Science in healthcare operations from Harvard Medical School (2021–2023).

== Careers and community engagement ==
Hall’s business career has encompassed various positions in the healthcare industry. In 2009, he joined Humana as a Medicare Divisional Consultant. From 2011 to 2013, Hall was a Managing Pharmacist, first with Giant Eagle and then with Walmart, before being promoted to Regional Operations Compliance Officer. In 2015, he joined Riverside Health Systems as System Director, Care Management-Complex & Chronic Care Operations. In 2017, he became Summa Health’s System Director, Bundled Payment. Hall joined Integra Connect, a healthcare technology and consulting company, in 2022, and currently is Vice President, Accountable Care and Payment Innovation. Hall also serves as a Major in the Judge Advocate General (JAG) Corp. in the United States Army Reserve.

He served as an elected board member of the Akron Public Schools Board of Education, one of Ohio's eight largest public-school districts, from 2020-2023, including as the board president in his final year. Hall has served on the Board of Directors for the Boys and Girls Club of Greater Akron, Stan Hywet Hall & Gardens, Scouting America, Better Kenmore CDC and Planned Parenthood of Greater Ohio.

== Elections ==
Hall lost a Democratic primary race for State Representative in 2012 against incumbent Vernon Sykes. In 2019, he was elected to the Akron Public Schools Board of Education and served on the board from 2020-2023, as vice president (2021-22) and president (2023). Hall won the Democratic primary for the House District 34 Seat in 2024 and went on to win the general election against GOP candidate Adam Bozic, receiving 53.2% of the vote.

== Committee assignments ==
During the 136th General Assembly, Hall has served as the Ranking Member of the Insurance Committee and Veterans & Military Development Committee and has served on the Energy Committee, Medicaid Committee, Joint Meeting of the House and Senate Medicaid Committees, and Ways & Means Committee.

As of June 2026, Hall serves on the following committees in the Ohio House.

- Insurance (Ranking Member)
- Energy
- Medicaid
- Veterans and Military Development

== Political positions ==
=== Education ===
Protecting public school funding is one of Hall's top priorities as a House representative. He served as president of the Akron Public School Board and has supported legislation that protects public education.

At Akron Public Schools, Hall facilitated teacher pay raises and improved school security through a negotiated agreement with the Akron Education Association. During his board presidency, he secured approval for the construction of a new building in Kenmore for the district’s Miller South School for the Visual and Performing Arts.

Limiting vouchers for non-public and/or non-charter schools and upholding Ohio's Fair School Funding Formula are examples of initiatives Hall advocates for as a member of the Ohio House. He votes against legislation that limits school funding because he believes successful schools contribute to successful communities.

=== Property tax relief ===
Reducing property taxes without sacrificing quality education has been a goal of Hall's since his 2024 election. Currently, Hall serves as a primary sponsor for HB 365, the Property Tax Refund Act, alongside House Rep. Sean Brennan. This initiative would grant lower-income Ohioans tax relief without cutting local funding for services like education, police and food pantries.

=== Healthcare ===
Hall recognizes the need for healthcare equity and access after working in the field for nearly 20 years, which is why protecting reproductive rights and increasing access to healthcare are priorities of his. Hall voted against House Bill 96, a bill that could eliminate Medicaid health insurance for 800K Ohioans and puts hospitals in certain areas at risk of closing. He advocates for a healthcare system that helps Ohioans slowly get back on their feet in contrast to the proposed changes that could leave 1 out of 50 Ohioans without Medicaid.

In 2026, Hall sponsored HB 890, the Prescription Relief, Inflation Cost Elimination (PRICE) Act, and HB 891, the Fair Health Claims Act.
