= Rachel Baker =

Ohio State Representative

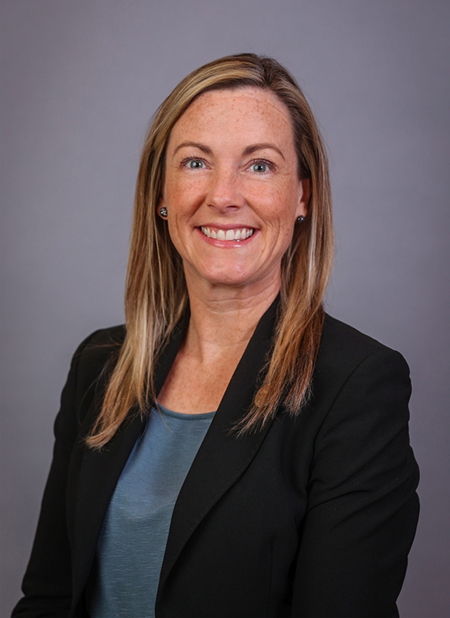

Member of the Ohio House of Representatives from the 27th district
- Incumbent
- Assumed office January 3, 2023
- Preceded by: Tom Brinkman Jr.

Personal details
- Born: May 29, 1975 (age 51)
- Party: Democratic
- Children: 3
- Education: University of Michigan (BS); University of Cincinnati (BSN); University of Michigan (MSW); University of Cincinnati (PhD)

Rachel B. Baker (May 29, 1975) is a nurse and American politician who has served as a member of the Ohio House of Representatives since 2023. Representing the 27th district, Baker's constituency encompasses eastern Hamilton County, including portions of Cincinnati.

== Early life and career ==
Baker earned a Bachelor of Science (in psychology) from the University of Michigan, as well as a Bachelor of Science in Nursing from the University of Cincinnati. She went on to receive a Masters of Social Work from the University of Michigan's Rackham Graduate School in 1999, and a Doctor of Philosophy from the University of Cincinnati in 2006.

Baker is currently employed by Cincinnati-based TriHealth Inc. as a Nurse Researcher. She also concurrently serves as an adjunct professor for the University of Cincinnati College of Nursing.

== Ohio House of Representatives ==
With incumbent Representative Tom Brinkman unable to re-run in 2022 due to term limits, Baker and four others sought to replace him. In the Democratic primary, Baker defeated former Cincinnati mayoral candidate Gavi Begtrup with 62% of the vote, despite being outspent by an almost 3-to-1 ratio. In the general election, Baker earned 56% of the vote, defeating Republican anti-abortion activist Jenn Giroux. Baker was sworn into the position on January 3, 2023.

Baker later sought reelection for the same position in 2024, winning the general election with 55.8% of the vote.

Baker serves as the ranking member of the Aviation and Aerospace Committee, and as a member of the Behavioral Health, Health Provider Services, Public Health Policy, and Technology and Innovation Committees.

In 2021, Baker ran unsuccessfully to serve on the board of the Forest Hills Local School District. During her tenure as state representative, Baker has criticized the board, which she claims refused to meet with her due to her Democratic party affiliation.

== Personal life ==
Baker currently resides just outside of Cincinnati in Anderson Township, Ohio. She lives there with her three children and a family dog.
