= Adam Mathews =

American politician

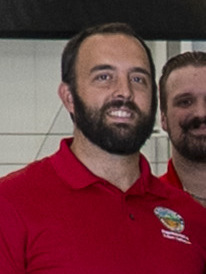
- Mathews in 2025

Member of the Ohio House of Representatives from the 56th district
- Incumbent
- Assumed office January 1, 2023
- Preceded by: Paul Zeltwanger (redistricting)

Personal details
- Party: Republican
- Education: University of Notre Dame

Adam Mathews is an American politician who has served in the Ohio House of Representatives from the 56th district since 2023. Prior to serving in the state legislature, Mathews worked as a civilian engineer for the Naval Nuclear Propulsion Program and later an intellectual property attorney. He also served on Lebanon City Council and as vice mayor of Lebanon.

Mathew currently serves on the Arts, Athletics, and Tourism, Energy, Judiciary, Public Insurance and Pensions, and Redistricting committees, as well as the Joint Committee on Agency Rule Review.

Mathews endorsed Vivek Ramaswamy in the 2026 Ohio gubernatorial election.
