= Nick Santucci =

American politician

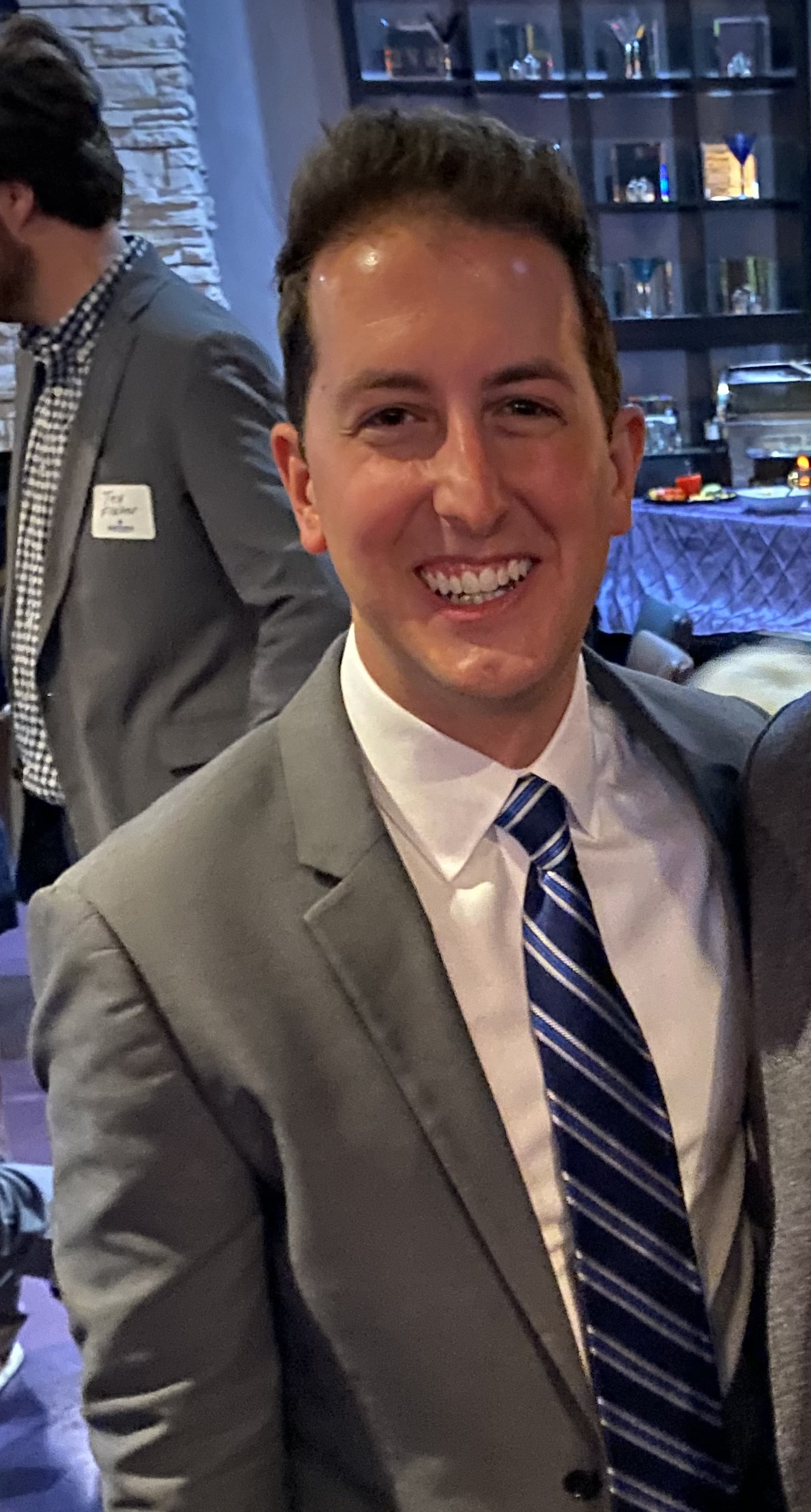

Majority Leader-designate of the Ohio House of Representatives
- Assuming office January 4, 2027
- Succeeding: Marilyn John

Member of the Ohio House of Representatives from the 64th district
- Incumbent
- Assumed office January 1, 2023
- Preceded by: Michael O'Brien

Personal details
- Born: Nick Santucci; May 28, 1991 (age 35) Warren, Ohio, U.S.
- Party: Republican
- Spouse: Alexis Santucci (m. 2023)
- Children: 1
- Education: John Carroll University (BA, Political Science)

Nick Santucci is an American politician. A member of the Republican Party, he represents the 64th district of the Ohio House of Representatives.

== Electoral history ==
Santucci was elected to serve the 64th district in 2022. He was re-elected in 2024 with 56% of the vote. In 2025, he was selected as the house Majority Whip for the 136th General Assembly.

Ohio House of Representatives
Year	Republican	Votes	Pct	Democratic	Votes	Pct
2022	Nick Santucci	21,847	50.9%	Vince Peterson II	21,072	49.1%
2024	Nick Santucci	30,439	56.2%	Lauren Mathews	23,695	43.8%

Ohio House of Representatives
Preceded by Marilyn John	Majority Leader of the Ohio House of Representatives; Taking office 2027	Designate
