= Sean Brennan (politician) =

American politician

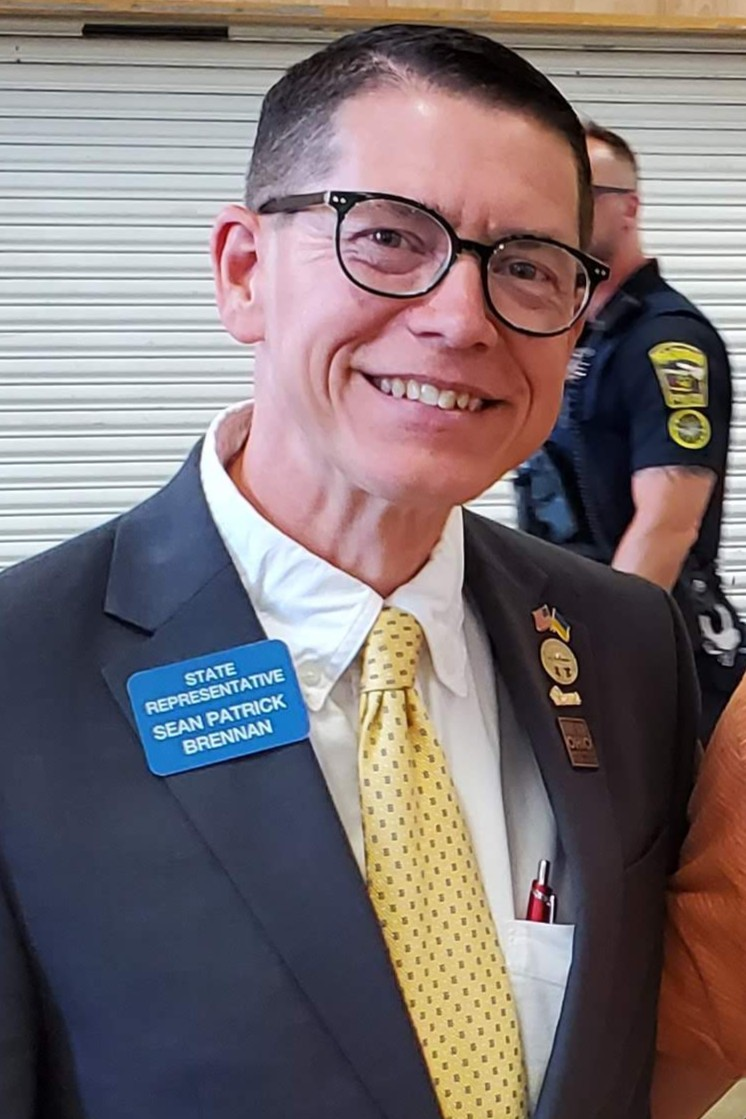

Member of the Ohio House of Representatives from the 14th district
- Incumbent
- Assumed office January 1, 2023

Personal details
- Born: Sandusky, Ohio
- Party: Democratic
- Education: University of Dayton; Cleveland State University

Sean Brennan is an American politician and former high school teacher serving since 2023 as a member of the Ohio House of Representatives for the 14th District, affiliating with the Democratic Party.

Brennan graduated summa cum laude from the University of Dayton with a bachelor's degree in International Studies, and earned a master's degree in secondary school administration from Cleveland State University.

Prior to entering the state house, Brennan worked as a public school teacher for three decades, and served on Parma City Council for nearly two decades, including more than ten years as council president.

Brennan was first elected in 2022, defeating Republican Jolene Austin, and was reelected in 2024. Brennan is a ranking member of the House Public Insurance and Pensions Committee and a member of the Education, Energy, Local Government, and Joint Committee on Agency Rule Review committees.
