= Bob Young (Ohio politician) =

American businessman and politician (born 1982)

Member of the Ohio House of Representatives from the 32nd district
- In office January 1, 2021 – October 2, 2023
- Preceded by: Anthony DeVitis
- Succeeded by: Jack Daniels

Personal details
- Born: May 4, 1982 (age 44) Green, Ohio, U.S.
- Party: Republican
- Children: 4
- Occupation: Auctioneer
- Website: ohiohouse.gov/members/bob-young

Bob Young (born May 4, 1981) is an American businessman, auctioneer, and politician who served as a member of the Ohio House of Representatives. He assumed office on January 1, 2021 and resigned on October 2, 2023.

== Vote on expulsion of Larry Householder ==
During the 134th Ohio General Assembly, Bob Young voted against the expulsion of former Ohio House Speaker Larry Householder. At the time of the vote, Householder had been federally indicted in connection with the Ohio nuclear bribery scandal, which centered on the passage of House Bill 6. The Ohio House of Representatives voted 75–21 to expel Householder, with Bob Young among the 21 Republican members who opposed the resolution.

== Career ==
Prior to serving in the House, Young was a member of the Green, Ohio City Council. He also owns an auctioning company. Young ran for and won the 2020 election for the 36th district of the Ohio House of Representatives, defeating Democratic nominee Matt Shaughnessy.

== Personal life ==
Young is married and has four children.

On July 9, 2023, Young was charged with two counts of domestic violence and one count of disrupting public service. The account of the incident alleges that Young struck his wife in the face with an open hand, an act that was witnessed by one of their four children.

In light of the charges, Ohio House Speaker Jason Stephens asked Young to resign. In response, Young stated that he planned to remain in office.

On August 28, 2023 Young was arrested a second time for violating his wife's protection order.

On September 8, 2023, Young announced that he would be resigning effective October 2.
