= Rodney Creech =

American politician from Ohio

Member of the Ohio House of Representatives from the 40th district
- In office 2023–present

Member of the Ohio House of Representatives from the 43rd district
- In office January 1, 2021 – 2023
- Preceded by: Jeffery Todd Smith

Personal details
- Party: Republican
- Education: Morehead State University (BA)

Rodney Creech is a Republican member of the Ohio House of Representatives representing the 40th district. He was elected in 2020, defeating Democrat Amy Cox with 54% of the vote.

== Electoral history ==
Election results
Year	Office	Election	Votes for Creech	%	Opponent	Party	Votes	%
2020	Ohio House of Representatives	General	31,463	54.2%	Amy Cox	Democrat	26,552	45.8%
2022	Ohio House of Representatives	General	30,028	71.7%	Amy Cox	Democrat	11,877	28.3%
2024	Ohio House of Representatives	General			Bobbie Arnold	Democrat		

== Controversy ==
In May 2025, reports were made public of allegations regarding sexual misconduct with an underage family member of Creech. Specifically, according to Ohio Bureau of Criminal Investigation, Creech was accused in 2023 by a minor female relative of climbing into bed with her while erect and wearing only his underwear. According to NBC4, text messages showed the minor complaining that Creech had been rubbing her legs and grabbing her waist. Creech admitted to investigators he had gotten into bed with the minor in his underwear but denied the sexual nature of the allegations.

An investigation into the matter yielded claims made by his family, but no criminal charges were pursued by local authorities. Members of the Ohio Republican Party openly called for Creech's resignation, following his removal from committee assignments by House Speaker Matt Huffman in May 2025. On February 17, 2026, it was reported that Creech's committee seats had been restored by Huffman. On February 20, 2026, the Ohio Republican Party endorsed Creech for reelection. In early May 2026, Creech defeated former representative J. Todd Smith 58% to 42% in the Republican primary for Ohio House District 40.
