= 2022 Ohio House of Representatives election =

- November 8, 2022

All 99 seats in the Ohio House of Representatives 50 seats needed for a majority
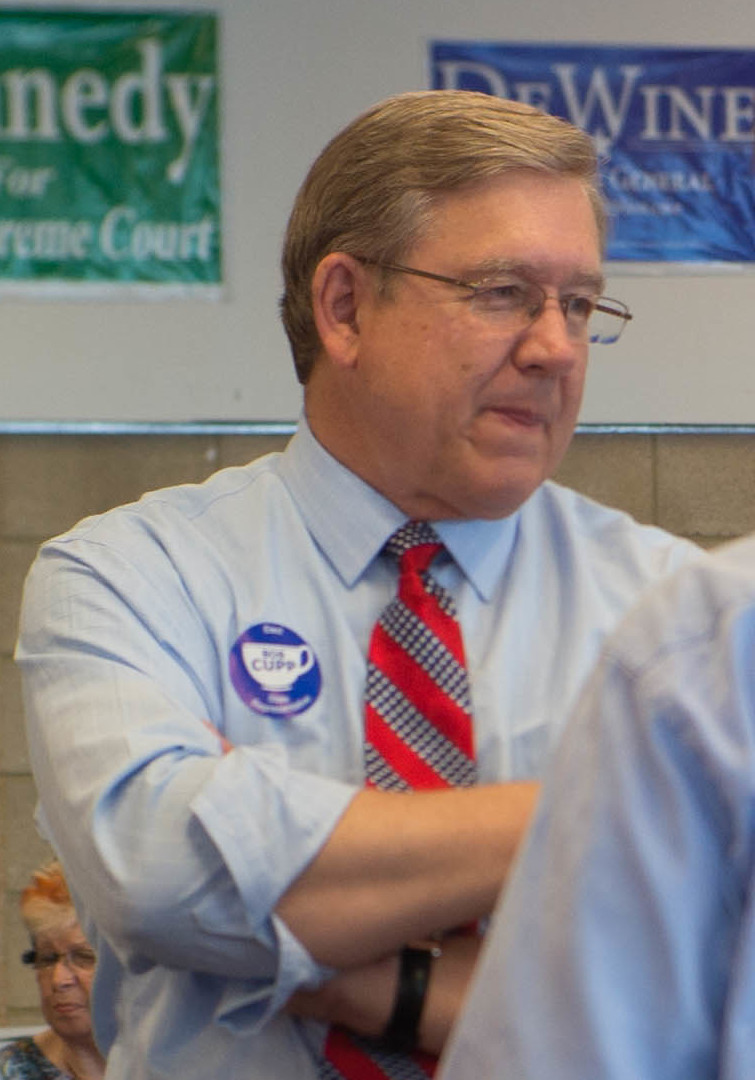

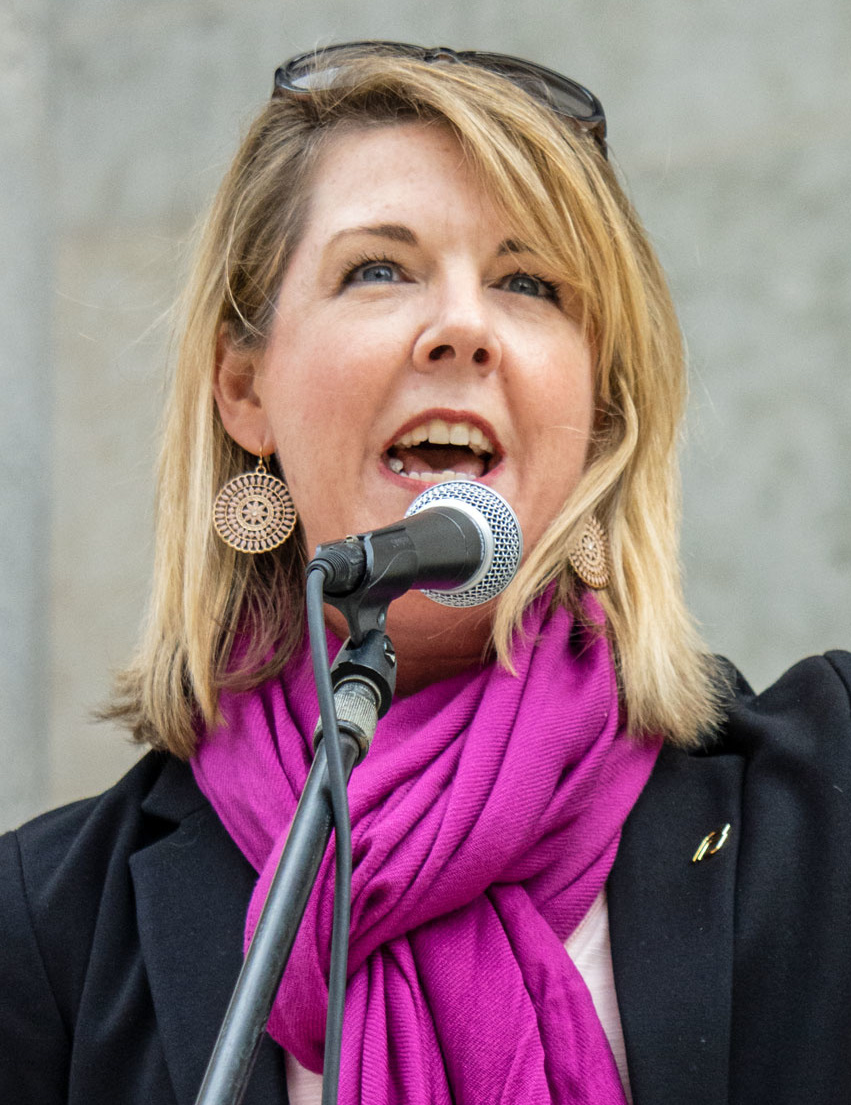
	Majority party	Minority party
Leader	Robert R. Cupp (term-limited)	Allison Russo
Party	Republican	Democratic
Leader's seat	78th district	7th district
Seats before	64	35
Seats after	67	32
Seat change	▲3	▼3
Popular vote	2,270,293	1,540,800
Percentage	58.8%	39.9%
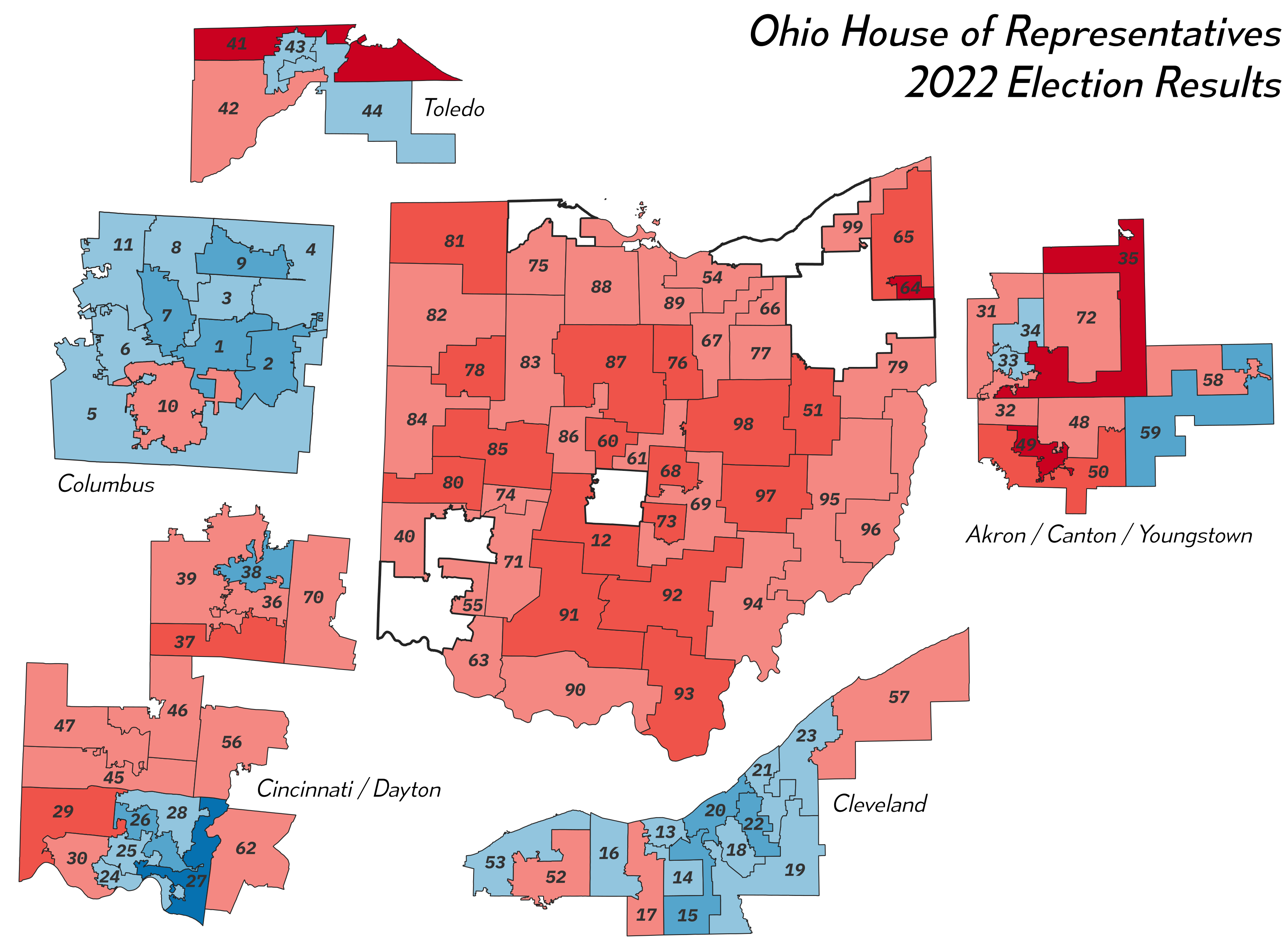
- Results; Democratic hold Uncontested Democratic hold Democratic gain Republican hold Uncontested Republican hold Republican gain
Speaker before election
Robert R. Cupp
Republican
Elected Speaker
Jason Stephens
Republican

The 2022 Ohio House of Representatives elections were held on November 8, 2022, to elect representatives in all 99 districts of the Ohio House of Representatives. Members were elected in single-member constituencies to two-year terms. These elections were held concurrently with various federal and state elections, including for Governor of Ohio and the Ohio Senate.

Although primary elections were originally scheduled for May 3, they were postponed to August 2 after the Supreme Court of Ohio rejected state legislative maps approved by the state redistricting commission as part of the 2020 redistricting cycle.

== Predictions ==
Source	Ranking	As of
Sabato's Crystal Ball	Safe R	May 19, 2022

== Overview ==
Party	Candidates	Votes		Seats		
Party	Candidates	No.	%	Before	After	+/–
Republican	89	2,270,293	58.8	64	67	▲3
Democratic	81	1,540,800	39.9	35	32	▼3
Independent	3	37,737	1.0			
Write-In	9	11,153	0.2			
Total		3,859,983	100.00	99		

=== Summary by district ===
District	Incumbent status	Incumbent	Winner	Result
1st	Running	Dontavius Jarrells		Incumbent Democrat re-elected
1st	Not running (Note: Running for Ohio Attorney General)	Jeffrey Crossman		
2nd	Running	Latyna Humphrey		Incumbent Democrat re-elected
3rd	Not running (Note: Running for the 10th District Court of Appeals)	Kristin Boggs	Ismail Mohamed	Democratic hold
4th	Running	Mary Lightbody		Incumbent Democrat re-elected
5th	Running	Richard Brown		Incumbent Democrat re-elected
6th	Running	Adam Miller		Incumbent Democrat re-elected
7th	Running	Allison Russo		Incumbent Democrat re-elected
7th	Term-limited	David Leland		
8th	Running	Beth Liston		Incumbent Democrat re-elected
9th	N/A	None (Note: This district had no incumbent following redistricting. The former incumbent, Democrat Bishara Addison, was redistricted to the 22nd district.)	Munira Abdullahi	Democratic notional hold
10th	Not running (Note: Retiring)	Laura Lanese	David Dobos	Republican hold
11th	N/A	None (Note: This district had no incumbent following redistricting. The former incumbent, Democrat Shayla Davis, was redistricted to the 18th district.)	Anita Somani	Democratic notional hold
12th	Running	Brian Stewart		Incumbent Republican re-elected
13th	Running	Michael Skindell		Incumbent Democrat re-elected
14th	N/A	None (Note: This district had no incumbent following redistricting. The former incumbent, Democrat Bride Rose Sweeney, was redistricted to the 16th district.)	Sean Brennan	Democratic notional hold
15th	N/A	None (Note: This district had no incumbent following redistricting. The former incumbent, Democrat Jeffrey Crossman, was redistricted to the 1st district.)	Richard Dell'Aquila	Democratic notional hold
16th	Running	Bride Rose Sweeney		Incumbent Democrat re-elected
16th	Running (Note: Defeated in primary.)	Monique Smith		
17th	Running	Tom Patton		Incumbent Republican re-elected
18th	Not running	Shayla Davis	Darnell Brewer	Democratic hold
19th	Running	Phil Robinson		Incumbent Democrat re-elected
20th	Running	Terrence Upchurch		Incumbent Democrat re-elected
21st	Not running (Note: Running for Ohio Senate District 21.)	Kent Smith	Elliot Forhan	Democratic hold
22nd	Running	Juanita Brent		Incumbent Democrat re-elected
22nd	Not running	Bishara Addison		
23rd	Running	Daniel Troy		Incumbent Democrat re-elected
24th	Not running (Note: Running for Hamilton County Auditor)	Brigid Kelly	Dani Isaacsohn	Democratic hold
25th	Not running (Note: Running for Ohio Senate District 9)	Catherine Ingram	Cecil Thomas	Democratic hold
26th	Running	Sedrick Denson		Incumbent Democrat re-elected
27th	Term-limited	Tom Brinkman	Rachel Baker	Democratic gain
28th	Running	Jessica Miranda		Incumbent Democrat re-elected
29th	Running	Cindy Abrams		Incumbent Republican re-elected
30th	Running	Bill Seitz		Incumbent Republican re-elected
31st	Running	Bill Roemer		Incumbent Republican re-elected
32nd	Running	Bob Young		Incumbent Republican re-elected
33rd	Running	Tavia Galonski		Incumbent Democrat re-elected
33rd	Term-limited	Emilia Sykes		
34th	Running	Casey Weinstein		Incumbent Democrat re-elected
35th	N/A	None (Note: This district had no incumbent following redistricting. The former incumbent, Democrat Tavia Galonski, was redistricted to the 33rd district.)	Steve Demetriou	Republican notional gain
36th	Running	Andrea White		Incumbent Republican re-elected
37th	Running	Tom Young		Incumbent Republican re-elected
38th	Running	Willis Blackshear Jr.		Incumbent Democrat re-elected
39th	Running	Phil Plummer		Incumbent Republican re-elected
40th	Running	Rodney Creech		Incumbent Republican re-elected
41st	Term-limited	Michael Sheehy	Josh Williams	Republican gain
42nd	Running	Derek Merrin		Incumbent Republican re-elected
43rd	Not running (Note: Running for Ohio Senate District 11)	Paula Hicks-Hudson	Michele Grim	Democratic hold
44th	N/A	None (Note: This district had no incumbent following redistricting. The former incumbent, Democrat Paula Hicks-Hudson, was redistricted to the 43rd district.)	Elgin Rogers Jr.	Democratic notional hold
45th	Running	Jennifer Gross		Incumbent Republican re-elected
46th	Running	Thomas Hall		Incumbent Republican re-elected
47th	Running	Sara Carruthers		Incumbent Republican re-elected
48th	Running	Scott Oelslager		Incumbent Republican re-elected
49th	Running	Thomas West	Jim Thomas	Republican gain
50th	Running	Reggie Stoltzfus		Incumbent Republican re-elected
51st	Running	Brett Hudson Hillyer		Incumbent Republican re-elected
52nd	Running	Gayle Manning		Incumbent Republican re-elected
53rd	Running	Joe Miller		Incumbent Democrat re-elected
54th	Running	Dick Stein		Incumbent Republican re-elected
55th	Running	Scott Lipps		Incumbent Republican re-elected
56th	Term-limited	Paul Zeltwanger	Adam Matthews	Republican hold
57th	Running	Jamie Callender		Incumbent Republican re-elected
58th	Running	Alessandro Cutrona		Incumbent Republican re-elected
59th	Term-limited	Michele Lepore-Hagan	Lauren McNally	Democratic hold
60th	Running	Kris Jordan		Incumbent Republican re-elected
61st	Running	Shawn Stevens	Beth Lear	Republican hold
62nd	Running	Jean Schmidt		Incumbent Republican re-elected
63rd	Running	Adam Bird		Incumbent Republican re-elected
64th	Term-limited	Michael O'Brien	Nick Santucci	Republican gain
65th	Running	Mike Loychik		Incumbent Republican re-elected
66th	Running	Sharon Ray		Incumbent Republican re-elected
67th	N/A	None (Note: This district had no incumbent following redistricting. The former incumbent, Republican Kris Jordan, was redistricted to the 60th district.)	Melanie Miller	Republican notional hold
68th	Running	Mark Fraizer	Thaddeus Claggett	Republican hold
69th	Running	Kevin Miller		Incumbent Republican re-elected
70th	Running	Brian Lampton		Incumbent Republican re-elected
71st	Running	Bill Dean		Incumbent Republican re-elected
72nd	Running	Gail Pavliga		Incumbent Republican re-elected
73rd	Running	Jeff LaRe		Incumbent Republican re-elected
74th	Term-limited	Kyle Koehler	Bernard Willis	Republican hold
75th	Running	Haraz Ghanbari		Incumbent Republican re-elected
76th	Running	Marilyn John		Incumbent Republican re-elected
77th	Running	Scott Wiggam		Incumbent Republican re-elected
78th	Running	Susan Manchester		Incumbent Republican re-elected
78th	Term-limited	Robert Cupp		
79th	Term-limited	Tim Ginter	Monica Robb Blasdel	Republican hold
80th	Running	Jena Powell		Incumbent Republican re-elected
81st	Running	Jim Hoops		Incumbent Republican re-elected
82nd	Not running (Note: Running for Ohio's 9th Congressional District.)	Craig Riedel	Roy Klopfenstein	Republican hold
83rd	Running	Jon Cross		Incumbent Republican re-elected
84th	N/A	None (Note: This district had no incumbent following redistricting. The former incumbent, Republican Susan Manchester, was redistricted to the 78th district.)	Angela King	Republican notional hold
85th	Term-limited	Nino Vitale	Tim Barhorst	Republican hold
86th	Running	Tracy Richardson		Incumbent Republican re-elected
87th	Running	Riordan McClain		Incumbent Republican re-elected
88th	Running	Gary Click		Incumbent Republican re-elected
89th	Running	D. J. Swearingen		Incumbent Republican re-elected
90th	Running	Brian Baldridge		Incumbent Republican re-elected
91st	Not running (Note: Running for Ohio Senate District 17.)	Shane Wilkin	Bob Peterson	Republican hold
92nd	Running	Mark Johnson		Incumbent Republican re-elected
93rd	Running	Jason Stephens		Incumbent Republican re-elected
94th	Running	Jay Edwards		Incumbent Republican re-elected
95th	Running	Don Jones		Incumbent Republican re-elected
96th	Running	Ron Ferguson		Incumbent Republican re-elected
97th	Running	Adam Holmes		Incumbent Republican re-elected
98th	Running	Darrell Kick		Incumbent Republican re-elected
99th	Running	Sarah Fowler Arthur		Incumbent Republican re-elected
99th	Not running (Note: Running for the 11th District Court of Appeals.)	Diane Grendell		

=== Closest races ===
Seats where the margin of victory was under 10%:

1. District 5, 0.42%
2. District 36, 1.11% gain
3. District 64, 1.8% gain
4. District 72, 2.44%
5. District 23, 3% gain
6. District 41, 3.2%
7. District 31, 4.14% gain
8. District 53, 4.2%
9. District 59, 4.25%
10. District 28, 4.84%
11. District 10, 5.78%
12. District 49, 7.12% gain
13. District 34, 7.6%
14. District 32, 7.64% gain
15. District 42, 7.8%

== Outgoing incumbents ==
=== Republicans ===
1. District 4: Robert R. Cupp was term-limited.
2. District 5: Tim Ginter was term-limited.
3. District 27: Tom Brinkman was term-limited.
4. District 54: Paul Zeltwanger was term-limited.
5. District 79: Kyle Koehler was term-limited.
6. District 85: Nino Vitale was term-limited.

=== Democrats ===
1. District 8: Kent Smith was term-limited.
2. District 22: David J. Leland was term-limited.
3. District 34: Emilia Sykes was term-limited.
4. District 46: Michael Sheehy was term-limited.
5. District 58: Michele Lepore-Hagan was term-limited.
6. District 64: Michael O'Brien was term-limited.

== See also ==
- 2022 Ohio elections
- List of Ohio state legislatures
