= 2020 Ohio House of Representatives election =

2020 Ohio House of Representatives Election
- November 3, 2020

All 99 seats in the Ohio House of Representatives 50 seats needed for a majority
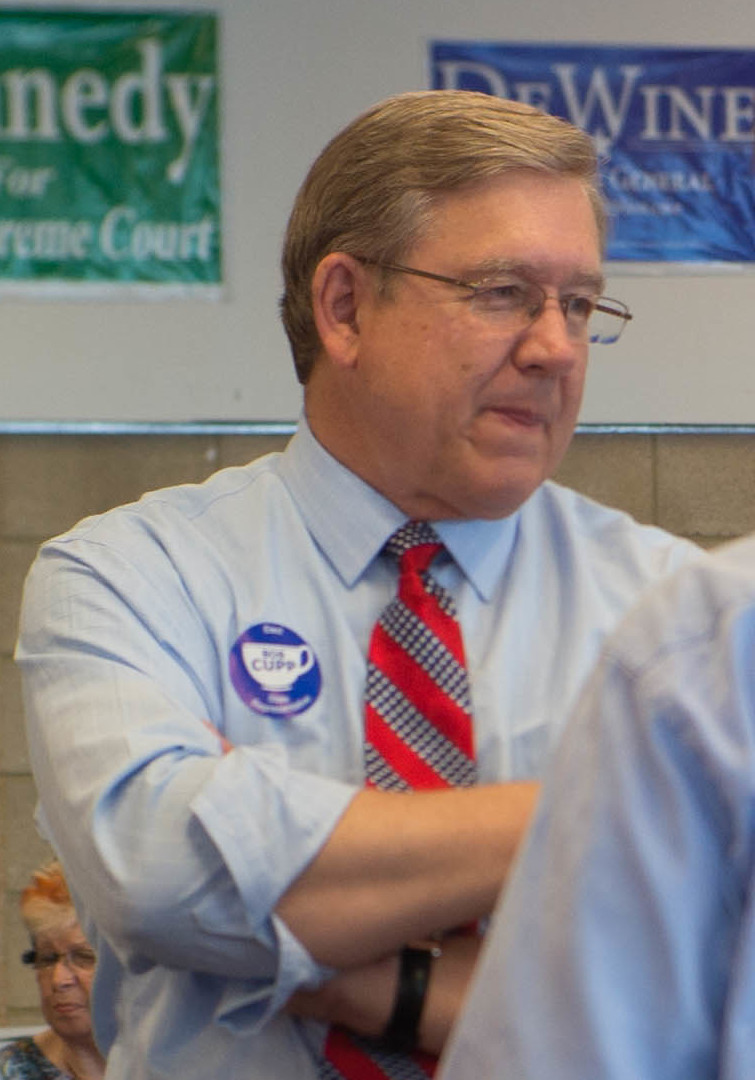

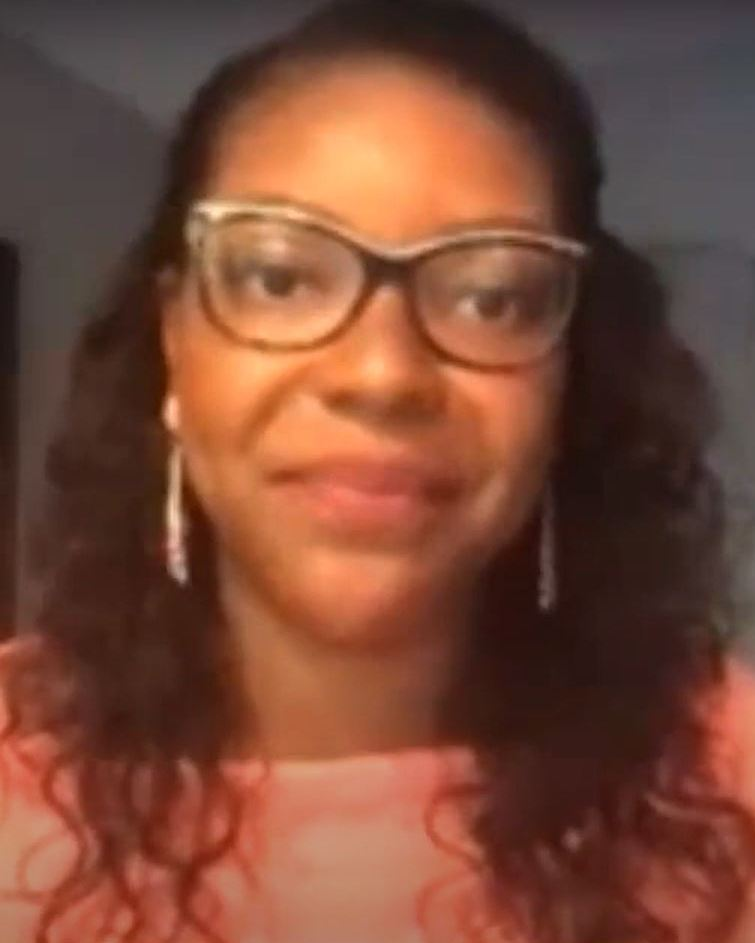
	Majority party	Minority party
Leader	Robert R. Cupp	Emilia Sykes
Party	Republican	Democratic
Leader since	July 30, 2020	February 6, 2019
Leader's seat	District 4	District 34
Seats before	61	38
Seats after	64	35
Seat change	▲3	▼3
Popular vote	3,175,713	2,300,433
Percentage	57.65%	41.76%
Swing	▲5.69%	▼6.03%
- Results; Democratic hold Democratic gain Republican hold Republican gain
Speaker before election
Robert R. Cupp
Republican
Elected Speaker
Robert R. Cupp
Republican

The 2020 Ohio House of Representatives Election was held on November 3, 2020, with the primary election held on April 28, 2020. (Note: The primary election was originally scheduled for March 17, 2020. As a result of the ongoing COVID-19 pandemic, Governor Mike DeWine announced that the primary would be moved to June 2. Shortly thereafter, the Ohio General Assembly passed a bill setting an almost entirely vote-by-mail primary for April 28.) Ohio voters elected state representatives in the 99 Ohio House of Representatives districts. State representatives elected in 2020 will be eligible to serve a two-year term beginning January 2021 and ending December 2022. These elections will coincide with elections for U.S. President and the Ohio Senate.

Democrats hoped they could break the Republican supermajority in the chamber given their strength in suburban districts in 2018 and the fallout of the Ohio nuclear bribery scandal. However, further Democratic gains failed to materialize and Republicans picked up four seats along the state's eastern border, further consolidating their control.

== Predictions ==
Source	Ranking	As of
The Cook Political Report	Likely R	October 21, 2020

== Statewide results ==
Party	Candidates	Votes			Seats Won		
Party	Candidates	No.	%	+/–	No.	+/–	%
Republican Party	92	3,175,713	57.65	▲5.69	64	▲3	64.65
Democratic Party	87	2,300,433	41.76	▼6.03	35	▼3	35.35
Independent	12	28,192	0.51	▲0.44	0	0	0.00
Libertarian Party	2	4,130	0.07	▼0.11	0	0	0.00
Total		5,508,468	100.00		99		100.00

Popular vote
Republican	57.65%
Democratic	41.76%
Other	0.59%

House seats won
Republican	64.65%
Democratic	35.35%

=== Closest races ===
Seats where the margin of victory was under 10%:

1. District 64, 0.8%
2. District 16, 1.4% gain
3. District 60, 1.4%
4. District 75, 2.2% gain
5. District 6, 2.8%
6. District 37, 2.8%
7. District 28, 3.4%
8. District 15, 4.4%
9. District 36, 4.6%
10. District 27, 6.2%
11. District 43, 8.4%
12. District 63, 8.4% gain
13. District 49, 8.8%

== Results by district ==
=== Overview ===
Results of the 2020 Ohio House of Representatives election
District	Incumbent status	Incumbent	Winner	Result
1st	Running	Scott Wiggam		Incumbent Republican re-elected
2nd	Term-limited	Mark Romanchuk	Marilyn John	Republican hold
3rd	Running	Haraz Ghanbari		Incumbent Republican re-elected
4th	Running	Robert Cupp		Incumbent Republican re-elected
5th	Running	Tim Ginter		Incumbent Republican re-elected
6th	Running	Phil Robinson		Incumbent Democrat re-elected
7th	Running	Tom Patton		Incumbent Republican re-elected
8th	Running	Kent Smith		Incumbent Democrat re-elected
9th	Running	Janine Boyd		Incumbent Democrat re-elected
10th	Running	Terrence Upchurch		Incumbent Democrat re-elected
11th	Running	Stephanie Howse		Incumbent Democrat re-elected
12th	Running	Juanita Brent		Incumbent Democrat re-elected
13th	Running	Michael Skindell		Incumbent Democrat re-elected
14th	Running	Bride Rose Sweeney		Incumbent Democrat re-elected
15th	Running	Jeffrey Crossman		Incumbent Democrat re-elected
16th	Running	David Greenspan	Monique Smith	Democratic gain
17th	Running	Adam Miller		Incumbent Democrat re-elected
18th	Running	Kristin Boggs		Incumbent Democrat re-elected
19th	Running	Mary Lightbody		Incumbent Democrat re-elected
20th	Running	Richard Brown		Incumbent Democrat re-elected
21st	Running	Beth Liston		Incumbent Democrat re-elected
22nd	Running	David Leland		Incumbent Democrat re-elected
23rd	Running	Laura Lanese		Incumbent Republican re-elected
24th	Running	Allison Russo		Incumbent Democrat re-elected
25th	Not running	Bernadine Kent	Dontavius Jarrells	Democratic hold
26th	Running	Erica Crawley		Incumbent Democrat re-elected
27th	Running	Tom Brinkman		Incumbent Republican re-elected
28th	Running	Jessica Miranda		Incumbent Democrat re-elected
29th	Running	Cindy Abrams		Incumbent Republican re-elected
30th	Running	Bill Seitz		Incumbent Republican re-elected
31st	Running	Brigid Kelly		Incumbent Democrat re-elected
32nd	Running	Catherine Ingram		Incumbent Democrat re-elected
33rd	Running	Sedrick Denson		Incumbent Democrat re-elected
34th	Running	Emilia Sykes		Incumbent Democrat re-elected
35th	Running	Tavia Galonski		Incumbent Democrat re-elected
36th	Term-limited	Anthony DeVitis	Bob Young	Republican hold
37th	Running	Casey Weinstein		Incumbent Democrat re-elected
38th	Running	Bill Roemer		Incumbent Republican re-elected
39th	Term-limited	Fred Strahorn	Willis Blackshear Jr.	Democratic hold
40th	Running	Phil Plummer		Incumbent Republican re-elected
41st	Term-limited	Jim Butler	Andrea White	Republican hold
42nd	Not running (Note: Running for Ohio Senate District 6.)	Niraj Antani	Tom Young	Republican hold
43rd	Not running (Note: Filed for re-election, but withdrew from the race on January 31, 2020.)	Jeffery Todd Smith	Rodney Creech	Republican hold
44th	Running	Paula Hicks-Hudson		Incumbent Democrat re-elected
45th	Running	Lisa Sobecki		Incumbent Democrat re-elected
46th	Running	Michael Sheehy		Incumbent Democrat re-elected
47th	Running	Derek Merrin		Incumbent Republican re-elected
48th	Running	Scott Oelslager		Incumbent Republican re-elected
49th	Running	Thomas West		Incumbent Democrat re-elected
50th	Running	Reggie Stoltzfus		Incumbent Republican re-elected
51st	Running	Sara Carruthers		Incumbent Republican re-elected
52nd	Not running (Note: Running for Ohio Senate District 4.)	George Lang	Jennifer Gross	Republican hold
53rd	Not running	Candice Keller	Thomas Hall	Republican hold
54th	Running	Paul Zeltwanger		Incumbent Republican re-elected
55th	Running	Gayle Manning		Incumbent Republican re-elected
56th	Running	Joe Miller		Incumbent Democrat re-elected
57th	Running	Dick Stein		Incumbent Republican re-elected
58th	Running	Michele Lepore-Hagan		Incumbent Democrat re-elected
59th	Running	Alessandro Cutrona		Incumbent Republican re-elected
60th	Term-limited	John Rogers	Dan Troy	Democratic hold
61st	Running	Jamie Callender		Incumbent Republican re-elected
62nd	Running	Scott Lipps		Incumbent Republican re-elected
63rd	Running	Gil Blair	Mike Loychik	Republican gain
64th	Running	Michael O'Brien		Incumbent Democrat re-elected
65th	Term-limited	John Becker	Jean Schmidt	Republican hold
66th	Term-limited	Doug Green	Adam Bird	Republican hold
67th	Running	Kris Jordan		Incumbent Republican re-elected
68th	Running	Rick Carfagna		Incumbent Republican re-elected
69th	Not running (Note: Running for Medina County Commissioner.)	Steve Hambley	Sharon Ray	Republican hold
70th	Running	Darrell Kick		Incumbent Republican re-elected
71st	Running	Mark Fraizer		Incumbent Republican re-elected
72nd	Running	Larry Householder		Incumbent Republican re-elected
73rd	Term-limited	Rick Perales	Brian Lampton	Republican hold
74th	Running	Bill Dean		Incumbent Republican re-elected
75th	Running	Randi Clites	Gail Pavliga	Republican gain
76th	Running	Diane Grendell		Incumbent Republican re-elected
77th	Running	Jeffrey LaRe		Incumbent Republican re-elected
78th	Term-limited	Ron Hood	Brian Stewart	Republican hold
79th	Running	Kyle Koehler		Incumbent Republican re-elected
80th	Running	Jena Powell		Incumbent Republican re-elected
81st	Running	Jim Hoops		Incumbent Republican re-elected
82nd	Running	Craig Riedel		Incumbent Republican re-elected
83rd	Running	Jon Cross		Incumbent Republican re-elected
84th	Running	Susan Manchester		Incumbent Republican re-elected
85th	Running	Nino Vitale		Incumbent Republican re-elected
86th	Running	Tracy Richardson		Incumbent Republican re-elected
87th	Running	Riordan McClain		Incumbent Republican re-elected
88th	Not running (Note: Running for Ohio Senate District 26.)	Bill Reineke	Gary Click	Republican hold
89th	Running	Douglas Swearingen, Jr.		Incumbent Republican re-elected
90th	Running	Brian Baldridge		Incumbent Republican re-elected
91st	Running	Shane Wilkin		Incumbent Republican re-elected
92nd	Term-limited	Gary Scherer	Mark Johnson	Republican hold
93rd	Running	Jason Stephens		Incumbent Republican re-elected
94th	Running	Jay Edwards		Incumbent Republican re-elected
95th	Running	Don Jones		Incumbent Republican re-elected
96th	Term-limited	Jack Cera	Ron Ferguson	Republican gain
97th	Running	Adam Holmes		Incumbent Republican re-elected
98th	Running	Brett Hillyer		Incumbent Republican re-elected
99th	Term-limited	John Patterson	Sarah Fowler	Republican gain

=== Detailed results ===
==== District 1 ====
===== Primary results =====
Democratic primary
Party	Candidate	Votes	%
Democratic	Alison Theiss	4,253	100.0
Total votes		4,253	100.0

Republican primary
Party	Candidate	Votes	%
Republican	Scott Wiggam (incumbent)	6,924	87.5
Republican	Jason Wetz	990	12.5
Total votes		7,914	100.0

===== General election results =====
Ohio's 1st House District General Election, 2020
Party	Candidate	Votes	%
Republican	Scott Wiggam (incumbent)	36,730	69.9
Democratic	Alison Theiss	15,836	30.1
Total votes		52,566	100.0
Republican hold		Swing	▲3.6

==== District 2 ====
===== Primary results =====
Democratic primary
Party	Candidate	Votes	%
Democratic	Sam Grady (write-in)	125	62.2
Democratic	Carline Curry (write-in)	76	37.8
Total votes		201	100.0

Republican primary
Party	Candidate	Votes	%
Republican	Marilyn John	7,858	69.3
Republican	Nathan Martin	3,474	30.7
Total votes		11,332	100.0

===== General election results =====
Ohio's 2nd House District General Election, 2020
Party	Candidate	Votes	%
Republican	Marilyn John	41,102	71.4
Democratic	Sam Grady	16,440	28.6
Total votes		57,642	100.0
Republican hold		Swing	▲3.8

==== District 3 ====
===== Primary results =====
Democratic primary
Party	Candidate	Votes	%
Democratic	Laurel Johnson	7,243	100.0
Total votes		7,243	100.0

Republican primary
Party	Candidate	Votes	%
Republican	Haraz Ghanbari (incumbent)	5,782	100.0
Total votes		5,782	100.0

===== General election results =====
Ohio's 3rd House District General Election, 2020
Party	Candidate	Votes	%
Republican	Haraz Ghanbari (incumbent)	37,677	58.2
Democratic	Laurel Johnson	27,094	41.8
Total votes		64,771	100.0
Republican hold		Swing	▼4.1

==== District 4 ====
===== Primary results =====
Republican primary
Party	Candidate	Votes	%
Republican	Robert Cupp (incumbent)	9,420	100.0
Total votes		9,420	100.0

===== General election results =====
Ohio's 4th House District General Election, 2020
Party	Candidate	Votes	%
Republican	Robert Cupp (incumbent)	38,882	100.0
Total votes		38,882	100.0
Republican hold		Swing	▲26.9 (Note: Seat was contested in the previous election.)

==== District 5 ====
===== Primary results =====
Democratic primary
Party	Candidate	Votes	%
Democratic	Daniel Winston	3,911	100.0
Total votes		3,911	100.0

Republican primary
Party	Candidate	Votes	%
Republican	Tim Ginter (incumbent)	6,573	100.0
Total votes		6,573	100.0

===== General election results =====
Ohio's 5th House District General Election, 2020
Party	Candidate	Votes	%
Republican	Tim Ginter (incumbent)	36,243	74.3
Democratic	Daniel Winston	12,554	25.7
Total votes		48,979	100.0
Republican hold		Swing	▲4.0

==== District 6 ====
===== Primary results =====
Democratic primary
Party	Candidate	Votes	%
Democratic	Phil Robinson (incumbent)	10,753	100.0
Total votes		10,753	100.0

Republican primary
Party	Candidate	Votes	%
Republican	Shay Hawkins	3,611	53.9
Republican	Ed Hargate	3,095	46.1
Total votes		6,706	100.0

===== General election results =====
Ohio's 6th House District General Election, 2020
Party	Candidate	Votes	%
Democratic	Phil Robinson (incumbent)	37,995	51.4
Republican	Shay Hawkins	35,982	48.6
Total votes		73,977	100.0
Democratic hold		Swing	▲0.2

==== District 7 ====
===== Primary results =====
Democratic primary
Party	Candidate	Votes	%
Democratic	Joan Sweeny	8,082	100.0
Total votes		8,082	100.0

Republican primary
Party	Candidate	Votes	%
Republican	Tom Patton (incumbent)	6,561	100.0
Total votes		6,561	100.0

===== General election results =====
Ohio's 7th House District General Election, 2020
Party	Candidate	Votes	%
Republican	Tom Patton (incumbent)	37,493	58.2
Democratic	Joan Sweeny	26,922	41.8
Total votes		64,415	100.0
Republican hold		Swing	▼2.6

==== District 8 ====
===== Primary results =====
Democratic primary
Party	Candidate	Votes	%
Democratic	Kent Smith (incumbent)	11,185	100.0
Total votes		11,185	100.0

Republican primary
Party	Candidate	Votes	%
Republican	Chris Litwinowicz (write-in)	16	100.0
Total votes		16	100.0

===== General election results =====
Ohio's 8th House District General Election, 2020
Party	Candidate	Votes	%
Democratic	Kent Smith (incumbent)	41,159	100.0
Total votes		41,159	100.0
Democratic hold		Swing	0.0

==== District 9 ====
===== Primary results =====
Democratic primary
Party	Candidate	Votes	%
Democratic	Janine Boyd (incumbent)	16,008	86.1
Democratic	Vincent Stokes II	2,580	13.9
Total votes		18,588	100.0

Republican primary
Party	Candidate	Votes	%
Republican	Dustin Russell	1,087	100.0
Total votes		1,087	100.0

===== General election results =====
Ohio's 9th House District General Election, 2020
Party	Candidate	Votes	%
Democratic	Janine Boyd (incumbent)	50,894	86.6
Republican	Dustin Russell	7,868	13.4
Total votes		58,762	100.0
Democratic hold		Swing	▼1.2

==== District 10 ====
===== Primary results =====
Democratic primary
Party	Candidate	Votes	%
Democratic	Terrence Upchurch (incumbent)	6,151	82.0
Democratic	J. Allen Burger	1,355	18.0
Total votes		7,506	100.0

===== General election results =====
Ohio's 10th House District General Election, 2020
Party	Candidate	Votes	%
Democratic	Terrence Upchurch (incumbent)	28,453	100.0
Total votes		28,453	100.0
Democratic hold		Swing	0.0

==== District 11 ====
===== Primary results =====
Democratic primary
Party	Candidate	Votes	%
Democratic	Stephanie Howse (incumbent)	5,760	100.0
Total votes		5,760	100.0

===== General election results =====
Ohio's 11th House District General Election, 2020
Party	Candidate	Votes	%
Democratic	Stephanie Howse (incumbent)	27,346	100.0
Total votes		27,346	100.0
Democratic hold		Swing	▲13.3

==== District 12 ====
===== Primary results =====
Democratic primary
Party	Candidate	Votes	%
Democratic	Juanita Brent (incumbent)	10,015	79.9
Democratic	Felicia Washington Ross	2,503	20.0
Democratic	Phyllis Ann Peterson (write-in)	17	0.1
Total votes		12,535	100.0

Republican primary
Party	Candidate	Votes	%
Republican	Jerry Powell (write-in)	64	100.0
Total votes		64	100.0

===== General election results =====
Ohio's 12th House District General Election, 2020
Party	Candidate	Votes	%
Democratic	Juanita Brent (incumbent)	43,247	82.2
Republican	Jerry Powell	9,342	17.8
Total votes		52,589	100.0
Democratic hold		Swing	▼17.8 (Note: Seat was uncontested in the previous election.)

==== District 13 ====
===== Primary results =====
Democratic primary
Party	Candidate	Votes	%
Democratic	Michael Skindell (incumbent)	7,628	100.0
Total votes		7,628	100.0

Republican primary
Party	Candidate	Votes	%
Republican	Daniel Harrington (write-in)	135	100.0
Total votes		135	100.0

===== General election results =====
Ohio's 13th House District General Election, 2020
Party	Candidate	Votes	%
Democratic	Michael Skindell (incumbent)	33,647	74.3
Republican	Daniel Harrington	11,621	25.7
Total votes		45,268	100.0
Democratic hold		Swing	▼3.6

==== District 14 ====
===== Primary results =====
Democratic primary
Party	Candidate	Votes	%
Democratic	Bride Rose Sweeney (incumbent)	7,211	100.0
Total votes		7,211	100.0

Republican primary
Party	Candidate	Votes	%
Republican	Lynn McMahan	2,770	100.0
Total votes		2,770	100.0

===== General election results =====
Ohio's 13th House District General Election, 2020
Party	Candidate	Votes	%
Democratic	Bride Rose Sweeney (incumbent)	27,618	58.4
Republican	Lynn McMahan	19,643	41.6
Total votes		47,261	100.0
Democratic hold		Swing	▼13.4

==== District 15 ====
===== Primary results =====
Democratic primary
Party	Candidate	Votes	%
Democratic	Jeffrey Crossman (incumbent)	6,014	100.0
Total votes		6,014	100.0

Republican primary
Party	Candidate	Votes	%
Republican	Kevin Kussmaul	2,986	100.0
Total votes		2,986	100.0

===== General election results =====
Ohio's 15th House District General Election, 2020
Party	Candidate	Votes	%
Democratic	Jeffrey Crossman (incumbent)	24,020	52.2
Republican	Kevin Kussmaul	22,018	47.8
Total votes		46,038	100.0
Democratic hold		Swing	▼4.1

==== District 16 ====
===== Primary results =====
Democratic primary
Party	Candidate	Votes	%
Democratic	Monique Smith	9,025	70.2
Democratic	Joe Romano	3,839	29.8
Total votes		12,864	100.0

Republican primary
Party	Candidate	Votes	%
Republican	David Greenspan (incumbent)	5,353	100.0
Total votes		5,353	100.0

===== Polling =====
Poll source	Date	Sample size (Note: Key: A – all adults RV – registered voters LV – likely voters V – unclear)	Margin of error	David Greenspan (R)	Monique Smith (D)	Undecided
PPP	September 9–10	562 (V)	–	37%	40%	23%

===== General election results =====
Ohio's 16th House District General Election, 2020
Party	Candidate	Votes	%
Democratic	Monique Smith	35,013	50.7
Republican	David Greenspan (incumbent)	34,075	49.3
Total votes		69.088	100.0
Democratic gain from Republican		Swing	▲4.6

==== District 17 ====
===== Primary results =====
Democratic primary
Party	Candidate	Votes	%
Democratic	Adam Miller (incumbent)	4,559	100.0
Total votes		4,559	100.0

Republican primary
Party	Candidate	Votes	%
Republican	Tim Haske	1,258	60.2
Republican	John Rutan	831	39.8
Total votes		2,089	100.0

===== General election results =====
Ohio's 17th House District General Election, 2020
Party	Candidate	Votes	%
Democratic	Adam Miller (incumbent)	21,664	56.6
Republican	Tim Haske	16,588	43.4
Total votes		38,252	100.0
Democratic hold		Swing	▼3.4

==== District 18 ====
===== Primary results =====
Democratic primary
Party	Candidate	Votes	%
Democratic	Kristin Boggs (incumbent)	11,437	100.0
Total votes		11,437	100.0

Republican primary
Party	Candidate	Votes	%
Republican	Kayla Anne Packard	1,117	100.0
Total votes		1,117	100.0

===== General election results =====
Ohio's 18th House District General Election, 2020
Party	Candidate	Votes	%
Democratic	Kristin Boggs (incumbent)	45,861	77.9
Republican	Kayla Anne Packard	13,007	22.1
Total votes		58,868	100.0
Democratic hold		Swing	▼1.9

==== District 19 ====
===== Primary results =====
Democratic primary
Party	Candidate	Votes	%
Democratic	Mary Lightbody (incumbent)	10,916	100.0
Total votes		10,916	100.0

Republican primary
Party	Candidate	Votes	%
Republican	Meredith Freedhoff	4,591	100.0
Total votes		4,591	100.0

===== General election results =====
Ohio's 19th House District General Election, 2020
Party	Candidate	Votes	%
Democratic	Mary Lightbody (incumbent)	42,267	56.2
Republican	Meredith Freedhoff	32,950	43.8
Total votes		75,217	100.0
Democratic hold		Swing	▲0.8

==== District 20 ====
===== Primary results =====
Democratic primary
Party	Candidate	Votes	%
Democratic	Richard Brown (incumbent)	7,527	100.0
Total votes		7,527	100.0

Republican primary
Party	Candidate	Votes	%
Republican	Chris Baer	3,348	100.0
Total votes		3,348	100.0

===== General election results =====
Ohio's 20th House District General Election, 2020
Party	Candidate	Votes	%
Democratic	Richard Brown (incumbent)	36,330	59.3
Republican	Chris Baer	24,928	40.7
Total votes		61,258	100.0
Democratic hold		Swing	▲1.3

==== District 21 ====
===== Primary results =====
Democratic primary
Party	Candidate	Votes	%
Democratic	Beth Liston (incumbent)	10,834	100.0
Total votes		10,834	100.0

Republican primary
Party	Candidate	Votes	%
Republican	Mehek Cooke	4,099	100.0
Total votes		4,099	100.0

===== General election results =====
Ohio's 21st House District General Election, 2020
Party	Candidate	Votes	%
Democratic	Beth Liston (incumbent)	42,990	56.8
Republican	Mehek Cooke	32,756	42.2
Total votes		75,746	100.0
Democratic hold		Swing	▲0.1

==== District 22 ====
===== Primary results =====
Democratic primary
Party	Candidate	Votes	%
Democratic	David Leland (incumbent)	10,183	79.2
Democratic	Kashi Adhikari	2,680	20.8
Total votes		12,863	100.0

Republican primary
Party	Candidate	Votes	%
Republican	Stephany Spencer	2,520	100.0
Total votes		2,520	100.0

===== General election results =====
Ohio's 22nd House District General Election, 2020
Party	Candidate	Votes	%
Democratic	David Leland (incumbent)	45,754	100.0
Total votes		45,754	100.0
Democratic hold		Swing	▲27.0

==== District 23 ====
===== Primary results =====
Democratic primary
Party	Candidate	Votes	%
Democratic	Nancy Day-Achauer	6,172	100.0
Total votes		6,172	100.0

Republican primary
Party	Candidate	Votes	%
Republican	Laura Lanese (incumbent)	4,090	100.0
Total votes		4,090	100.0

===== Polling =====
Poll source	Date	Sample size	Margin of error	Laura Lanese (R)	Nancy Day-Achauer (D)	Undecided
PPP	September 9–10	512 (V)	–	37%	35%	28%

===== General election results =====
Ohio's 23rd House District General Election, 2020
Party	Candidate	Votes	%
Republican	Laura Lanese (incumbent)	34,275	55.5
Democratic	Nancy Day-Achauer	27,532	44.5
Total votes		61,807	100.0
Republican hold		Swing	▼0.2

==== District 24 ====
===== Primary results =====
Democratic primary
Party	Candidate	Votes	%
Democratic	Allison Russo (incumbent)	11,826	100.0
Total votes		11,826	100.0

Republican primary
Party	Candidate	Votes	%
Republican	Pat Manley	4,386	100.0
Total votes		4,386	100.0

===== General election results =====
Ohio's 24th House District General Election, 2020
Party	Candidate	Votes	%
Democratic	Allison Russo (incumbent)	42,935	57.9
Republican	Pat Manley	31,202	42.1
Total votes		74,137	100.0
Democratic hold		Swing	▲1.0

==== District 25 ====
===== Primary results =====
Democratic primary
Party	Candidate	Votes	%
Democratic	Dontavius Jarrells	6,176	44.9
Democratic	Mohamud Jama	3,203	23.3
Democratic	Mayo Makinde	2,354	17.1
Democratic	Kofi Nsia-Pepra	1,109	8.1
Democratic	Gary Josephson	912	6.6
Total votes		13,754	100.0

Republican primary
Party	Candidate	Votes	%
Republican	Jim Burgess	1,098	100.0
Total votes		1,098	100.0

===== General election results =====
Ohio's 25th House District General Election, 2020
Party	Candidate	Votes	%
Democratic	Dontavius Jarrells	41,312	82.3
Republican	Jim Burgess	8,870	17.7
Total votes		50,182	100.0
Democratic hold		Swing	▼2.0

==== District 26 ====
===== Primary results =====
Democratic primary
Party	Candidate	Votes	%
Democratic	Erica Crawley (incumbent)	10,656	100.0
Total votes		10,656	100.0

===== General election results =====
Ohio's 26th House District General Election, 2020
Party	Candidate	Votes	%
Democratic	Erica Crawley (incumbent)	45,350	100.0
Total votes		45,350	100.0
Democratic hold		Swing	▲17.9

==== District 27 ====
===== Primary results =====
Democratic primary
Party	Candidate	Votes	%
Democratic	Sara Bitter	8,775	100.0
Total votes		8,775	100.0

Republican primary
Party	Candidate	Votes	%
Republican	Tom Brinkman (incumbent)	7,574	100.0
Total votes		7,574	100.0

===== Polling =====
Poll source	Date	Sample size	Margin of error	Tom Brinkman (R)	Sara Bitter (D)	Undecided
PPP	September 9–10	524 (V)	–	36%	38%	26%

===== General election results =====
Ohio's 27th House District General Election, 2020
Party	Candidate	Votes	%
Republican	Tom Brinkman (incumbent)	37,723	53.1
Democratic	Sara Bitter	33,339	46.9
Total votes		71,062	100.0
Republican hold		Swing	▼0.5

==== District 28 ====
===== Primary results =====
Democratic primary
Party	Candidate	Votes	%
Democratic	Jessica Miranda (incumbent)	10,026	99.7
Democratic	Regina Collins (write-in)	28	0.3
Total votes		10,054	100.0

Republican primary
Party	Candidate	Votes	%
Republican	Chris Monzel	6,589	100.0
Total votes		6,589	100.0

===== General election results =====
Ohio's 28th House District General Election, 2020
Party	Candidate	Votes	%
Democratic	Jessica Miranda (incumbent)	35,353	51.7
Republican	Chris Monzel	33,039	48.3
Total votes		68,392	100.0
Democratic hold		Swing	▲1.8

==== District 29 ====
===== Primary results =====
Republican primary
Party	Candidate	Votes	%
Republican	Cindy Abrams (incumbent)	6,494	100.0
Total votes		6,494	100.0

===== General election results =====
Ohio's 29th House District General Election, 2020
Party	Candidate	Votes	%
Republican	Cindy Abrams (incumbent)	43,320	98.2
Independent	Harrison Stanley (write-in)	792	1.8
Total votes		44,112	100.0
Republican hold		Swing	▲33.2

==== District 30 ====
===== Primary results =====
Republican primary
Party	Candidate	Votes	%
Republican	Bill Seitz (incumbent)	7,772	100.0
Total votes		7,772	100.0

===== General election results =====
Ohio's 30th House District General Election, 2020
Party	Candidate	Votes	%
Republican	Bill Seitz (incumbent)	42,269	72.0
Independent	Tom Roll	16,426	28.0
Total votes		58,695	100.0
Republican hold		Swing	▲2.3

==== District 31 ====
===== Primary results =====
Democratic primary
Party	Candidate	Votes	%
Democratic	Brigid Kelly (incumbent)	10,469	100.0
Total votes		10,469	100.0

===== General election results =====
Ohio's 31st House District General Election, 2020
Party	Candidate	Votes	%
Democratic	Brigid Kelly (incumbent)	42,180	100.0
Total votes		42,180	100.0
Democratic hold		Swing	0.0

==== District 32 ====
===== Primary results =====
Democratic primary
Party	Candidate	Votes	%
Democratic	Catherine Ingram (incumbent)	10,200	88.4
Democratic	Dadrien Washington	1,337	11.6
Total votes		11,537	100.0

===== General election results =====
Ohio's 32nd House District General Election, 2020
Party	Candidate	Votes	%
Democratic	Catherine Ingram (incumbent)	42,055	100.0
Total votes		42,055	100.0
Democratic hold		Swing	▲21.4

==== District 33 ====
===== Primary results =====
Democratic primary
Party	Candidate	Votes	%
Democratic	Sedrick Denson (incumbent)	11,004	76.9
Democratic	Terence Allen Gragston	3,365	23.4
Total votes		14,369	100.0

Republican primary
Party	Candidate	Votes	%
Republican	Mary Hill	2,261	100.0
Total votes		2,261	100.0

===== General election results =====
Ohio's 33rd House District General Election, 2020
Party	Candidate	Votes	%
Democratic	Sedrick Denson (incumbent)	41,500	74.9
Republican	Mary Hill	13,901	25.1
Total votes		55,401	100.0
Democratic hold		Swing	▼0.4

==== District 34 ====
===== Primary results =====
Democratic primary
Party	Candidate	Votes	%
Democratic	Emilia Sykes (incumbent)	10,789	100.0
Total votes		10,789	100.0

Republican primary
Party	Candidate	Votes	%
Republican	Henry Todd	1,584	100.0
Total votes		1,584	100.0

===== General election results =====
Ohio's 34th House District General Election, 2020
Party	Candidate	Votes	%
Democratic	Emilia Sykes (incumbent)	36,251	76.8
Republican	Henry Todd	10,926	23.2
Total votes		47,177	100.0
Democratic hold		Swing	▼1.2

==== District 35 ====
===== Primary results =====
Democratic primary
Party	Candidate	Votes	%
Democratic	Tavia Galonski (incumbent)	5,478	100.0
Total votes		5,478	100.0

Republican primary
Party	Candidate	Votes	%
Republican	Jodi Sarver	2,282	100.0
Total votes		2,282	100.0

===== General election results =====
Ohio's 35th House District General Election, 2020
Party	Candidate	Votes	%
Democratic	Tavia Galonski (incumbent)	22,341	56.5
Republican	Jodi Sarver	17,210	43.5
Total votes		39,551	100.0
Democratic hold		Swing	▼4.1

==== District 36 ====
===== Primary results =====
Democratic primary
Party	Candidate	Votes	%
Democratic	Matt Shaughnessy	6,259	65.5
Democratic	A.J. Harris	3,294	34.5
Total votes		9,553	100.0

Republican primary
Party	Candidate	Votes	%
Republican	Bob Young	4,822	100.0
Total votes		4,822	100.0

===== Polling =====
Poll source	Date	Sample size	Margin of error	Bob Young (R)	Matthew Shaughnessy (D)	Undecided
PPP	September 9–10	562 (V)	–	37%	37%	27%

===== General election results =====
Ohio's 36th House District General Election, 2020
Party	Candidate	Votes	%
Republican	Bob Young	32,294	52.3
Democratic	Matt Shaughnessy	29,441	47.7
Total votes		61,735	100.0
Republican hold		Swing	▼3.1

==== District 37 ====
===== Primary results =====
Democratic primary
Party	Candidate	Votes	%
Democratic	Casey Weinstein (incumbent)	9,612	100.0
Total votes		9,612	100.0

Republican primary
Party	Candidate	Votes	%
Republican	Beth Bigham	4,200	100.0
Total votes		4,200	100.0

===== Polling =====
Poll source	Date	Sample size	Margin of error	Casey Weinstein (D)	Beth Bigham (R)	Undecided
PPP	September 9–10	540 (V)	–	42%	36%	20%

===== General election results =====
Ohio's 37th House District General Election, 2020
Party	Candidate	Votes	%
Democratic	Casey Weinstein (incumbent)	36,789	51.4
Republican	Beth Bigham	34,776	48.6
Total votes		71,565	100.0
Democratic hold		Swing	▲0.9

==== District 38 ====
===== Primary results =====
Democratic primary
Party	Candidate	Votes	%
Democratic	Joe Campbell	7,068	100.0
Total votes		7,068	100.0

Republican primary
Party	Candidate	Votes	%
Republican	Bill Roemer (incumbent)	5,333	100.0
Total votes		5,333	100.0

===== General election results =====
Ohio's 38th House District General Election, 2020
Party	Candidate	Votes	%
Republican	Bill Roemer (incumbent)	38,669	60.5
Democratic	Joe Campbell	25,191	39.5
Total votes		63,860	100.0
Republican hold		Swing	▲3.1

==== District 39 ====
===== Primary results =====
Democratic primary
Party	Candidate	Votes	%
Democratic	Willis Blackshear, Jr.	5,478	68.9
Democratic	Jo'el Jones	1,646	20.7
Democratic	Walter Hickman, Jr.	826	10.4
Total votes		7,950	100.0

Republican primary
Party	Candidate	Votes	%
Republican	John Ferrell Mullins III	889	100.0
Total votes		889	100.0

===== General election results =====
Ohio's 39th House District General Election, 2020
Party	Candidate	Votes	%
Democratic	Willis Blackshear, Jr.	31,583	79.3
Republican	John Ferrell Mullins III	8,269	20.7
Total votes		39,852	100.0
Democratic hold		Swing	▼20.7

==== District 40 ====
===== Primary results =====
Democratic primary
Party	Candidate	Votes	%
Democratic	Leronda Jackson	5,306	100.0
Total votes		5,306	100.0

Republican primary
Party	Candidate	Votes	%
Republican	Phil Plummer (incumbent)	6,156	100.0
Total votes		6,156	100.0

===== General election results =====
Ohio's 40th House District General Election, 2020
Party	Candidate	Votes	%
Republican	Phil Plummer (incumbent)	38,318	65.1
Democratic	Leronda Jackson	20,543	34.9
Total votes		58,861	100.0
Republican hold		Swing	▲3.1

==== District 41 ====
===== Primary results =====
Democratic primary
Party	Candidate	Votes	%
Democratic	Cate Berger	7,318	100.0
Total votes		7,318	100.0

Republican primary
Party	Candidate	Votes	%
Republican	Andrea White	5,947	100.0
Total votes		5,947	100.0

===== General election results =====
Ohio's 41st House District General Election, 2020
Party	Candidate	Votes	%
Republican	Andrea White	37,172	56.8
Democratic	Cate Berger	28,314	43.2
Total votes		65,486	100.0
Republican hold		Swing	▲1.8

==== District 42 ====
===== Primary results =====
Republican primary
Party	Candidate	Votes	%
Republican	Tom Young	6,644	74.0
Republican	Jake Stubbs	2,341	26.0
Total votes		8,985	100.0

===== General election results =====
Ohio's 42nd House District General Election, 2020
Party	Candidate	Votes	%
Republican	Tom Young	48,394	100.0
Total votes		48,394	100.0
Republican hold		Swing	▲40.5

==== District 43 ====
===== Primary results =====
Democratic primary
Party	Candidate	Votes	%
Democratic	Amy Cox	6,664	100.0
Total votes		6,664	100.0

Republican primary
Party	Candidate	Votes	%
Republican	Rodney Creech	5,359	65.6
Republican	Jeffery Todd Smith (incumbent)	2,817	34.4
Total votes		8,176	100.0

===== Polling =====
Poll source	Date	Sample size	Margin of error	Rodney Creech (R)	Amy Cox (D)	Undecided
PPP	September 9–10	597 (V)	–	34%	35%	31%

===== General election results =====
Ohio's 43rd House District General Election, 2020
Party	Candidate	Votes	%
Republican	Rodney Creech	31,463	54.2
Democratic	Amy Cox	26,552	45.8
Total votes		58,015	100.0
Republican hold		Swing	▲3.7

==== District 44 ====
===== Primary results =====
Democratic primary
Party	Candidate	Votes	%
Democratic	Paula Hicks-Hudson (incumbent, write-in)	1,527	100.0
Total votes		1,527	100.0

Republican primary
Party	Candidate	Votes	%
Republican	Robert McMahon	1,085	100.0
Total votes		1,085	100.0

===== General election results =====
Ohio's 44th House District General Election, 2020
Party	Candidate	Votes	%
Democratic	Paula Hicks-Hudson (incumbent)	32,101	79.0
Republican	Robert McMahon	8,511	21.0
Total votes		40,612	100.0
Democratic hold		Swing	▼21.0

==== District 45 ====
===== Primary results =====
Democratic primary
Party	Candidate	Votes	%
Democratic	Lisa Sobecki (incumbent)	5,408	100.0
Total votes		5,408	100.0

Republican primary
Party	Candidate	Votes	%
Republican	Shane Logan	2,183	100.0
Total votes		2,183	100.0

===== General election results =====
Ohio's 45th House District General Election, 2020
Party	Candidate	Votes	%
Democratic	Lisa Sobecki (incumbent)	27,776	61.6
Republican	Shane Logan	17,282	38.4
Total votes		45,058	100.0
Democratic hold		Swing	▼2.1

==== District 46 ====
===== Primary results =====
Democratic primary
Party	Candidate	Votes	%
Democratic	Michael Sheehy (incumbent)	6,533	100.0
Total votes		6,533	100.0

Republican primary
Party	Candidate	Votes	%
Republican	Steven Salander	2,798	100.0
Total votes		2,798	100.0

===== General election results =====
Ohio's 46th House District General Election, 2020
Party	Candidate	Votes	%
Democratic	Michael Sheehy (incumbent)	31,088	57.6
Republican	Steven Salander	22,870	42.4
Total votes		53,958	100.0
Democratic hold		Swing	▼42.4

==== District 47 ====
===== Primary results =====
Democratic primary
Party	Candidate	Votes	%
Democratic	Nancy Larson	6,308	100.0
Total votes		6,308	100.0

Republican primary
Party	Candidate	Votes	%
Republican	Derek Merrin (incumbent)	5,290	100.0
Total votes		5,290	100.0

===== General election results =====
Ohio's 47th House District General Election, 2020
Party	Candidate	Votes	%
Republican	Derek Merrin (incumbent)	40,445	58.6
Democratic	Nancy Larson	28,538	41.4
Total votes		68,983	100.0
Republican hold		Swing	▲0.5

==== District 48 ====
===== Primary results =====
Republican primary
Party	Candidate	Votes	%
Republican	Scott Oelslager (incumbent)	8,453	100.0
Total votes		8,453	100.0

===== General election results =====
Ohio's 48th House District General Election, 2020
Party	Candidate	Votes	%
Republican	Scott Oelslager (incumbent)	50,815	97.4
Independent	Jean Mastin (write-in)	1,361	2.6
Total votes		52,176	100.0
Republican hold		Swing	▲33.3

==== District 49 ====
===== Primary results =====
Democratic primary
Party	Candidate	Votes	%
Democratic	Thomas West (incumbent)	5,912	100.0
Total votes		5,912	100.0

Republican primary
Party	Candidate	Votes	%
Republican	James Haavisto	3,547	100.0
Total votes		3,547	100.0

===== General election results =====
Ohio's 49th House District General Election, 2020
Party	Candidate	Votes	%
Democratic	Thomas West (incumbent)	24,305	54.4
Republican	James Haavisto	20,416	45.6
Total votes		44,721	100.0
Democratic hold		Swing	▼3.3

==== District 50 ====
===== Primary results =====
Democratic primary
Party	Candidate	Votes	%
Democratic	Brian Simeone	5,460	100.0
Total votes		5,460	100.0

Republican primary
Party	Candidate	Votes	%
Republican	Reggie Stoltzfus (incumbent)	8,240	100.0
Total votes		8,240	100.0

===== General election results =====
Ohio's 50th House District General Election, 2020
Party	Candidate	Votes	%
Republican	Reggie Stoltzfus (incumbent)	39,192	68.3
Democratic	Brian Simeone	18,197	31.7
Total votes		57,389	100.0
Republican hold		Swing	▲4.3

==== District 51 ====
===== Primary results =====
Republican primary
Party	Candidate	Votes	%
Republican	Sara Carruthers (incumbent)	5,830	100.0
Total votes		5,830	100.0

===== General election results =====
Ohio's 51st House District General Election, 2020
Party	Candidate	Votes	%
Republican	Sara Carruthers (incumbent)	35,533	93.4
Independent	Johnny Hamilton (write-in)	2,514	6.6
Total votes		38,047	100.0
Republican hold		Swing	▲33.3

==== District 52 ====
===== Primary results =====
Democratic primary
Party	Candidate	Votes	%
Democratic	Chuck Horn	5,121	100.0
Total votes		5,121	100.0

Republican primary
Party	Candidate	Votes	%
Republican	Jennifer Gross	5,382	51.9
Republican	Mark Welch	4,997	48.1
Total votes		10,379	100.0

===== General election results =====
Ohio's 52nd House District General Election, 2020
Party	Candidate	Votes	%
Republican	Jennifer Gross	44,953	63.3
Democratic	Mark Horn	26,019	36.7
Total votes		70,972	100.0
Republican hold		Swing	▲4.7

==== District 53 ====
===== Primary results =====
Democratic primary
Party	Candidate	Votes	%
Democratic	Michelle Novak	3,696	100.0
Total votes		3,696	100.0

Republican primary
Party	Candidate	Votes	%
Republican	Thomas Hall	3,507	44.6
Republican	Diane Mullins	3,001	38.1
Republican	Brett Guido	1,360	17.3
Total votes		7,868	100.0

===== General election results =====
Ohio's 53rd House District General Election, 2020
Party	Candidate	Votes	%
Republican	Thomas Hall	36,768	68.3
Democratic	Michelle Novak	17,106	31.7
Total votes		53,874	100.0
Republican hold		Swing	▲4.1

==== District 54 ====
===== Primary results =====
Democratic primary
Party	Candidate	Votes	%
Democratic	Morgan Showen	6,388	100.0
Total votes		6,388	100.0

Republican primary
Party	Candidate	Votes	%
Republican	Paul Zeltwanger (incumbent)	9,935	100.0
Total votes		9,935	100.0

===== General election results =====
Ohio's 54th House District General Election, 2020
Party	Candidate	Votes	%
Republican	Paul Zeltwanger (incumbent)	39,625	61.7
Democratic	Morgan Showen	24,551	38.3
Total votes		64,176	100.0
Republican hold		Swing	▲0.9

==== District 55 ====
===== Primary results =====
Democratic primary
Party	Candidate	Votes	%
Democratic	Zach Stepp	8,862	100.0
Total votes		8,862	100.0

Republican primary
Party	Candidate	Votes	%
Republican	Gayle Manning (incumbent)	5,737	100.0
Total votes		5,737	100.0

===== General election results =====
Ohio's 55th House District General Election, 2020
Party	Candidate	Votes	%
Republican	Gayle Manning (incumbent)	34,200	56.1
Democratic	Zach Stepp	26,682	43.8
Independent	Dale Stein (write-in)	56	0.1
Total votes		60,938	100.0
Republican hold		Swing	▲0.9

==== District 56 ====
===== Primary results =====
Democratic primary
Party	Candidate	Votes	%
Democratic	Joe Miller (incumbent)	10,220	100.0
Total votes		10,220	100.0

Republican primary
Party	Candidate	Votes	%
Republican	Bradley Lacko	3,774	100.0
Total votes		3,774	100.0

===== General election results =====
Ohio's 56th House District General Election, 2020
Party	Candidate	Votes	%
Democratic	Joe Miller (incumbent)	32,298	59.3
Republican	Bradley Lacko	22,157	40.7
Total votes		54,455	100.0
Democratic hold		Swing	▼3.3

==== District 57 ====
===== Primary results =====
Democratic primary
Party	Candidate	Votes	%
Democratic	Dara Adkison	6,289	100.0
Total votes		6,289	100.0

Republican primary
Party	Candidate	Votes	%
Republican	Dick Stein (incumbent)	7,554	100.0
Total votes		7,554	100.0

===== General election results =====
Ohio's 57th House District General Election, 2020
Party	Candidate	Votes	%
Republican	Dick Stein (incumbent)	42,388	67.1
Democratic	Dara Adkison	20,754	32.9
Total votes		63,142	100.0
Republican hold		Swing	▲4.0

==== District 58 ====
===== Primary results =====
Democratic primary
Party	Candidate	Votes	%
Democratic	Michele Lepore-Hagan (incumbent)	9,840	100.0
Total votes		9,840	100.0

Republican primary
Party	Candidate	Votes	%
Republican	David Simon	2,589	100.0
Total votes		2,589	100.0

===== General election results =====
Ohio's 58th House District General Election, 2020
Party	Candidate	Votes	%
Democratic	Michele Lepore-Hagan (incumbent)	32,218	67.4
Republican	David Simon	15,556	32.6
Total votes		47,774	100.0
Democratic hold		Swing	▼2.7

==== District 59 ====
===== Primary results =====
Democratic primary
Party	Candidate	Votes	%
Democratic	Chris Stanley	8,999	100.0
Total votes		8,999	100.0

Republican primary
Party	Candidate	Votes	%
Republican	Don Manning	5,917	100.0
Total votes		5,917	100.0

===== General election results =====
Ohio's 59th House District General Election, 2020
Party	Candidate	Votes	%
Republican	Alessandro Cutrona (incumbent) (Note: Cutrona was appointed to replace Don Manning, who died shortly before the primary election took place.)	40,993	60.8
Democratic	Chris Stanley	26,423	39.2
Total votes		67,416	100.0
Republican hold		Swing	▲10.4

==== District 60 ====
===== Primary results =====
Democratic primary
Party	Candidate	Votes	%
Democratic	Dan Troy	7,679	100.0
Total votes		7,679	100.0

Republican primary
Party	Candidate	Votes	%
Republican	George Phillips	6,224	100.0
Total votes		6,224	100.0

===== General election results =====
Ohio's 60th House District General Election, 2020
Party	Candidate	Votes	%
Democratic	Dan Troy	28,421	50.7
Republican	George Phillips	27,623	49.3
Total votes		56,044	100.0
Democratic hold		Swing	▼2.9

==== District 61 ====
===== Primary results =====
Democratic primary
Party	Candidate	Votes	%
Democratic	Adam Dudziak	7,230	100.0
Total votes		7,230	100.0

Republican primary
Party	Candidate	Votes	%
Republican	Jamie Callender (incumbent)	8,887	100.0
Total votes		8,887	100.0

===== General election results =====
Ohio's 61st House District General Election, 2020
Party	Candidate	Votes	%
Republican	Jamie Callender (incumbent)	41,658	61.23
Democratic	Adam Dudziak	26,378	38.77
Total votes		68,036	100.0
Republican hold			

==== District 62 ====
===== Primary results =====
Democratic primary
Party	Candidate	Votes	%
Democratic	Erin Rosiello	4,634	100.0
Total votes		4,634	100.0

Republican primary
Party	Candidate	Votes	%
Republican	Scott Lipps (incumbent)	9,899	100.0
Total votes		9,899	100.0

===== General election results =====
Ohio's 62nd House District General Election, 2020
Party	Candidate	Votes	%
Republican	Scott Lipps (incumbent)	54,802	74.7%
Democratic	Erin Rosiello	18,596	25.3%
Total votes		73,398	100.0
Republican hold		Swing	▲1.0

==== District 63 ====
===== Primary results =====
Democratic primary
Party	Candidate	Votes	%
Democratic	Gil Blair (incumbent)	7,936	64.1
Democratic	Barry Profato	2,879	23.2
Democratic	Werner Lange	1,573	12.7
Total votes		12,388	100.0

Republican primary
Party	Candidate	Votes	%
Republican	Mike Loychik	5,545	100.0
Total votes		5,545	100.0

===== General election results =====
Ohio's 63rd House District General Election, 2020
Party	Candidate	Votes	%
Republican	Mike Loychik	29,999	54.2
Democratic	Gil Blair (incumbent)	25,379	45.8
Total votes		55,378	100.0
Republican gain from Democratic		Swing	▲10.2

==== District 64 ====
===== Primary results =====
Democratic primary
Party	Candidate	Votes	%
Democratic	Michael O'Brien (incumbent)	8,611	100.0
Total votes		8,611	100.0

Republican primary
Party	Candidate	Votes	%
Republican	Martha Yoder	4,924	100.0
Total votes		4,924	100.0

===== General election results =====
Ohio's 64rd House District General Election, 2020
Party	Candidate	Votes	%
Democratic	Michael O'Brien (incumbent)	23,553	50.4
Republican	Martha Yoder	23,209	49.7
Total votes		46,762	100.0
Democratic hold		Swing	▼4.4

==== District 65 ====
===== Primary results =====
Democratic primary
Party	Candidate	Votes	%
Democratic	Alan Darnowsky	5,396	100.0
Total votes		5,396	100.0

Republican primary
Party	Candidate	Votes	%
Republican	Jean Schmidt	6,197	43.7
Republican	Joe Dills	5,879	41.4
Republican	Dillon Blevins	2,113	14.9
Total votes		14,189	100.0

===== General election results =====
Ohio's 65th House District General Election, 2020
Party	Candidate	Votes	%
Republican	Jean Schmidt	44,435	65.4
Democratic	Alan Darnowsky	23,019	33.9
Independent	Jim Lewis	506	0.7
Total votes		67,960	100.0
Republican hold		Swing	▼1.3

==== District 66 ====
===== Primary results =====
Republican primary
Party	Candidate	Votes	%
Republican	Adam Bird	4,787	34.0
Republican	Nick Owens	4,314	32.4
Republican	Allen Freeman	4,199	31.6
Total votes		13,300	100.0

===== General election results =====
Ohio's 66th House District General Election, 2020
Party	Candidate	Votes	%
Republican	Adam Bird	48,710	95.87
Independent	Alicia Gee (Write-in)	2,096	4.13
Total votes		50,806	100.0
Republican hold		Swing	▲24.5

==== District 67 ====
===== Primary results =====
Democratic primary
Party	Candidate	Votes	%
Democratic	Rachael Morocco	9,078	100.0
Total votes		9,078	100.0

Republican primary
Party	Candidate	Votes	%
Republican	Kris Jordan (incumbent)	10,976	100.0
Total votes		10,976	100.0

===== General election results =====
Ohio's 67th House District General Election, 2020
Party	Candidate	Votes	%
Republican	Kris Jordan (incumbent)	44,960	55.6
Democratic	Rachael Morocco	35,866	44.4
Total votes		80,826	100.0
Republican hold		Swing	▼0.6

==== District 68 ====
===== Primary results =====
Democratic primary
Party	Candidate	Votes	%
Democratic	Steven Mount	6,385	100.0
Total votes		6,385	100.0

Republican primary
Party	Candidate	Votes	%
Republican	Rick Carfagna (incumbent)	12,067	100.0
Total votes		12,067	100.0

===== General election results =====
Ohio's 68th House District General Election, 2020
Party	Candidate	Votes	%
Republican	Rick Carfagna (incumbent)	48,606	67.9
Democratic	Steven Mount	22,933	32.1
Total votes		71,539	100.0
Republican hold		Swing	▲3.8

==== District 69 ====
===== Primary results =====
Democratic primary
Party	Candidate	Votes	%
Democratic	Donna Beheydt	7,001	100.0
Total votes		7,001	100.0

Republican primary
Party	Candidate	Votes	%
Republican	Sharon Ray	7,679	100.0
Total votes		7,679	100.0

===== General election results =====
Ohio's 69th House District General Election, 2020
Party	Candidate	Votes	%
Republican	Sharon Ray	46,103	64.8
Democratic	Donna Beheydt	25,074	35.2
Total votes		71,177	100.0
Republican hold		Swing	▲1.0

==== District 70 ====
===== Primary results =====
Democratic primary
Party	Candidate	Votes	%
Democratic	Kevin Barnet	4,727	100.0
Total votes		4,727	100.0

Republican primary
Party	Candidate	Votes	%
Republican	Darrell Kick (incumbent)	6,485	66.4
Republican	Terry Robertson	3,282	33.6
Total votes		9,767	100.0

===== General election results =====
Ohio's 70th House District General Election, 2020
Party	Candidate	Votes	%
Republican	Darrell Kick (incumbent)	42,551	70.7
Democratic	Kevin Barnet	17,661	29.3
Total votes		60,212	100.0
Republican hold		Swing	▲5.6

==== District 71 ====
===== Primary results =====
Democratic primary
Party	Candidate	Votes	%
Democratic	Mark Carr	6,356	100.0
Total votes		6,356	100.0

Republican primary
Party	Candidate	Votes	%
Republican	Mark Fraizer (incumbent)	5,681	51.4
Republican	Thaddeus James Claggett	5,374	48.6
Total votes		11,055	100.0

===== General election results =====
Ohio's 71st House District General Election, 2020
Party	Candidate	Votes	%
Republican	Mark Fraizer (incumbent)	39,667	63.0
Democratic	Mark Carr	23,254	37.0
Total votes		62,921	100.0
Republican hold		Swing	▲1.2

==== District 72 ====
===== Primary results =====
Republican primary
Party	Candidate	Votes	%
Republican	Larry Householder (incumbent)	11,142	100.0
Total votes		11,142	100.0

===== General election results =====
Ohio's 72nd House District General Election, 2020
Party	Candidate	Votes	%
Republican	Larry Householder (incumbent)	31,707	71.1
Democratic	Marci McCaulay (write-in)	5,822	13.1
Republican	Jay Conrad (write-in)	4,046	9.1
Libertarian	Robert Leist (write-in)	2,312	5.2
Independent	Kaitlyn Clark (write-in)	742	1.7
Total votes		44,629	100.0
Republican hold		Swing	▲2.0

==== District 73 ====
===== Primary results =====
Democratic primary
Party	Candidate	Votes	%
Democratic	Kim McCarthy	7,202	100.0
Total votes		7,202	100.0

Republican primary
Party	Candidate	Votes	%
Republican	Brian Lampton	9,579	68.5
Republican	John Broughton	4,416	31.5
Total votes		13,995	100.0

===== General election results =====
Ohio's 73rd House District General Election, 2020
Party	Candidate	Votes	%
Republican	Brian Lampton	36,523	57.5
Democratic	Kim McCarthy	26,969	42.5
Total votes		63,492	100.0
Republican hold		Swing	▲1.0

==== District 74 ====
===== Primary results =====
Republican primary
Party	Candidate	Votes	%
Republican	Bill Dean (incumbent)	10,183	100.0
Total votes		10,183	100.0

===== General election results =====
Ohio's 74th House District General Election, 2020
Party	Candidate	Votes	%
Republican	Bill Dean (incumbent)	42,294	95.23
Democratic	Ted McClenen (Write-in)	1,965	4.42
Democratic	Michael Johnson (Write-in)	154	0.35
Total votes		44,413	100.0

==== District 75 ====
===== Primary results =====
Democratic primary
Party	Candidate	Votes	%
Democratic	Randi Clites (incumbent)	8,350	100.0
Total votes		8,350	100.0

Republican primary
Party	Candidate	Votes	%
Republican	Gail Pavliga	4,602	100.0
Total votes		4,602	100.0

===== General election results =====
Ohio's 75th House District General Election, 2020
Party	Candidate	Votes	%
Republican	Gail Pavliga	28,330	51.06
Democratic	Randi Clites (incumbent)	27,151	48.94
Total votes		55,481	100.0
Republican gain from Democratic			

==== District 76 ====
===== Primary results =====
Democratic primary
Party	Candidate	Votes	%
Democratic	Garrett Westhoven	6,865	100.0
Total votes		6,865	100.0

Republican primary
Party	Candidate	Votes	%
Republican	Diane Grendell (incumbent)	7,914	60.4
Republican	Frank Hall	5,180	39.6
Total votes		13,094	100.0

===== General election results =====
Ohio's 76th House District General Election, 2020
Party	Candidate	Votes	%
Republican	Diane Grendell (incumbent)	40,904	61.93
Democratic	Garrett Westhoven	25,141	38.07
Total votes		66,045	100.0
Republican hold			

==== District 77 ====
===== Primary results =====
Democratic primary
Party	Candidate	Votes	%
Democratic	Melissa Wilde	5,271	100.0
Total votes		5,271	100.0

Republican primary
Party	Candidate	Votes	%
Republican	Jeffrey LaRe (incumbent)	7,275	100.0
Total votes		7,275	100.0

===== General election results =====
Ohio's 77th House District General Election, 2020
Party	Candidate	Votes	%
Republican	Jeffrey LaRe (incumbent)	38,059	60.10
Democratic	Melissa Wilde	25,268	38.90
Total votes		63,327	100.0
Republican hold			

==== District 78 ====
===== Primary results =====
Democratic primary
Party	Candidate	Votes	%
Democratic	Charlotte Owens	4,613	100.0
Total votes		4,613	100.0

Republican primary
Party	Candidate	Votes	%
Republican	Brian Stewart	7,820	66.9
Republican	Bobby Mitchell	2,939	25.2
Republican	Aaron Adams	924	7.9
Total votes		11,683	100.0

===== General election results =====
Ohio's 78th House District General Election, 2020
Party	Candidate	Votes	%
Republican	Brian Stewart	42,314	72.71%
Democratic	Charlotte Owens	15,878	27.29%
Total votes		58,192	100.0
Republican hold			

==== District 79 ====
===== Primary results =====
Democratic primary
Party	Candidate	Votes	%
Democratic	Cynthia Richards	5,723	100.0
Total votes		5,723	100.0

Republican primary
Party	Candidate	Votes	%
Republican	Kyle Koehler (incumbent)	6,607	100.0
Total votes		6,607	100.0

===== General election results =====
Ohio's 79th House District General Election, 2020
Party	Candidate	Votes	%
Republican	Kyle Koehler (incumbent)	32,705	63.10
Democratic	Cynthia Richards	19,127	36.90
Total votes		51,832	100.0
Republican hold			

==== District 80 ====
===== Primary results =====
Democratic primary
Party	Candidate	Votes	%
Democratic	Ted Jones (write-in)	293	100.0
Total votes		293	100.0

Republican primary
Party	Candidate	Votes	%
Republican	Jena Powell (incumbent)	12,471	100.0
Total votes		12,471	100.0

===== General election results =====
Ohio's 80th House District General Election, 2020
Party	Candidate	Votes	%
Republican	Jena Powell (incumbent)	50,578	76.04
Democratic	Ted Jones	15,933	23.96
Total votes		66,511	100.0
Republican hold			

==== District 81 ====
===== Primary results =====
Republican primary
Party	Candidate	Votes	%
Republican	James Hoops (incumbent)	11,152	100.0
Total votes		11,152	100.0

===== General election results =====
Ohio's 81st House District General Election, 2020
Party	Candidate	Votes	%
Republican	James Hoops (incumbent)	49,880	97.56
Independent	Janet Breneman	1,249	2.44
Total votes		51,129	100.0
Republican hold		Swing	▲25.3

==== District 82 ====
===== Primary results =====
Republican primary
Party	Candidate	Votes	%
Republican	Craig Riedel (incumbent)	10,984	100.0
Total votes		10,984	100.0

===== General election results =====
Ohio's 82nd House District General Election, 2020
Party	Candidate	Votes	%
Republican	Craig Riedel (incumbent)	45,059	96.86
Independent	Elecia Wobler	1,462	3.14
Total votes		46,521	100.0
Republican hold		Swing	▲26.4

==== District 83 ====
===== Primary results =====
Republican primary
Party	Candidate	Votes	%
Republican	Jon Cross (incumbent)	12,850	100.0
Total votes		12,850	100.0

===== General election results =====
Ohio's 83rd House District General Election, 2020
Party	Candidate	Votes	%
Republican	Jon Cross (incumbent)	42,145	95.68
Democratic	Mary Harshfield (Write-in)	1,903	4.32
Total votes		44,048	100.0
Republican hold		Swing	▲30.9

==== District 84 ====
===== Primary results =====
Democratic primary
Party	Candidate	Votes	%
Democratic	Joseph Monbeck	3,305	100.0
Total votes		3,305	100.0

Republican primary
Party	Candidate	Votes	%
Republican	Susan Manchester (incumbent)	13,284	100.0
Total votes		13,284	100.0

===== General election results =====
Ohio's 84th House District General Election, 2020
Party	Candidate	Votes	%
Republican	Susan Manchester (incumbent)	54,172	84.98
Democratic	Joseph Monbeck	9,573	15.02
Total votes		63,745	100.0
Republican hold			

==== District 85 ====
===== Primary results =====
Republican primary
Party	Candidate	Votes	%
Republican	Nino Vitale (incumbent)	11,815	100.0
Total votes		11,815	100.0

===== General election results =====
Ohio's 85th House District General Election, 2020
Party	Candidate	Votes	%
Republican	Nino Vitale (incumbent)	40,825	100.0
Democratic	Ted Greek (Write-in)	3,933	8.79
Total votes		44,758	100.0
Republican hold		Swing	▲27.1

==== District 86 ====
===== Primary results =====
Democratic primary
Party	Candidate	Votes	%
Democratic	Tiffanie Roberts	5,021	100.0
Total votes		5,021	100.0

Republican primary
Party	Candidate	Votes	%
Republican	Tracy Richardson (incumbent)	9,762	100.0
Total votes		9,762	100.0

===== General election results =====
Ohio's 86th House District General Election, 2020
Party	Candidate	Votes	%
Republican	Tracy Richardson (incumbent)	39,510	70.37
Democratic	Tiffanie Roberts	16,635	29.63
Total votes		55,785	100.0
Republican hold			

==== District 87 ====
===== Primary results =====
Democratic primary
Party	Candidate	Votes	%
Democratic	Nicholas Barnes	3,867	100.0
Total votes		3,867	100.0

Republican primary
Party	Candidate	Votes	%
Republican	Riordan McClain (incumbent)	12,685	100.0
Total votes		12,685	100.0

===== General election results =====
Ohio's 87th House District General Election, 2020
Party	Candidate	Votes	%
Republican	Riordan McClain (incumbent)	41,440	76.15
Democratic	Nicholas Barnes	12,977	23.85
Total votes		54,417	100.0
Republican hold			

==== District 88 ====
===== Primary results =====
Democratic primary
Party	Candidate	Votes	%
Democratic	Chris Liebold	5,473	100.0
Total votes		5,473	100.0

Republican primary
Party	Candidate	Votes	%
Republican	Gary Click	5,555	41.3
Republican	Shayne Thomas	4,789	35.6
Republican	Ed Ollom	3,124	23.1
Total votes		13,468	100.0

===== General election results =====
Ohio's 88th House District General Election, 2020
Party	Candidate	Votes	%
Republican	Gary Click	32,823	62.90
Democratic	Chris Liebold	19,359	37.10
Total votes		52,182	100.0
Republican hold			

==== District 89 ====
===== Primary results =====
Democratic primary
Party	Candidate	Votes	%
Democratic	Alexis Miller	7,769	100.0
Total votes		7,769	100.0

Republican primary
Party	Candidate	Votes	%
Republican	Douglas Swearingen, Jr. (incumbent)	5,437	100.0
Total votes		5,437	100.0

===== Polling =====
Poll source	Date	Sample size	Margin of error	Douglas Swearingen Jr. (R)	Alexis Miller (D)	Undecided
PPP	September 9–10	588 (V)	–	37%	33%	30%

===== General election results =====
Ohio's 89th House District General Election, 2020
Party	Candidate	Votes	%
Republican	Douglas Swearingen, Jr. (incumbent)	35,675	57.30
Democratic	Alexis Miller	26,580	42.70
Total votes		62,255	100.0
Republican hold			

==== District 90 ====
===== Primary results =====
Republican primary
Party	Candidate	Votes	%
Republican	Brian Baldridge (incumbent)	10,493	100.0
Total votes		10,493	100.0

===== General election results =====
Ohio's 90th House District General Election, 2020
Party	Candidate	Votes	%
Republican	Brian Baldridge (incumbent)	39,779	100.0
Total votes		39,779	100.0
Republican hold		Swing	▲38.8

==== District 91 ====
===== Primary results =====
Democratic primary
Party	Candidate	Votes	%
Democratic	Scott Dailey	3,225	100.0
Total votes		3,225	100.0

Republican primary
Party	Candidate	Votes	%
Republican	Shane Wilkin (incumbent)	7,271	100.0
Total votes		7,271	100.0

===== General election results =====
Ohio's 91st House District General Election, 2020
Party	Candidate	Votes	%
Republican	Shane Wilkin (incumbent)	41,143	76.76
Democratic	Scott Dailey	12,455	23.24
Total votes		53,598	100.0
Republican hold			

==== District 92 ====
===== Primary results =====
Democratic primary
Party	Candidate	Votes	%
Democratic	Beth Workman	4,669	100.0
Total votes		4,669	100.0

Republican primary
Party	Candidate	Votes	%
Republican	Mark Johnson	5,411	100.0
Total votes		5,411	100.0

===== General election results =====
Ohio's 92nd House District General Election, 2020
Party	Candidate	Votes	%
Republican	Mark Johnson	34,884	67.02
Democratic	Beth Workman	17,165	32.98
Total votes		52,049	100.0
Republican hold			

==== District 93 ====
===== Primary results =====
Republican primary
Party	Candidate	Votes	%
Republican	Jason Stephens	10,177	64.2
Republican	Jeff Halley	5,682	35.8
Total votes		15,859	100.0

===== General election results =====
Ohio's 93rd House District General Election, 2020
Party	Candidate	Votes	%
Republican	Jason Stephens	43,937	98.13
Independent	Tad Saunders (Write-in)	838	1.87
Total votes		44,775	100.0
Republican hold		Swing	▲25.6

==== District 94 ====
===== Primary results =====
Democratic primary
Party	Candidate	Votes	%
Democratic	Katie O'Neill	5,356	100.0
Total votes		5,356	100.0

Republican primary
Party	Candidate	Votes	%
Republican	Jay Edwards (incumbent)	7,895	100.0
Total votes		7,895	100.0

===== General election results =====
Ohio's 94th House District General Election, 2020
Party	Candidate	Votes	%
Republican	Jay Edwards (incumbent)	31,584	60.39
Democratic	Katie O'Neill	20,719	39.61
Total votes		52,303	100.0
Republican hold			

==== District 95 ====
===== Primary results =====
Republican primary
Party	Candidate	Votes	%
Republican	Don Jones (incumbent)	10,919	100.0
Total votes		10,919	100.0

===== General election results =====
Ohio's 95th House District General Election, 2020
Party	Candidate	Votes	%
Republican	Don Jones (incumbent)	48,224	100.0
Total votes		48,224	100.0
Republican hold		Swing	▲34.3

==== District 96 ====
===== Primary results =====
Democratic primary
Party	Candidate	Votes	%
Democratic	Richard Olivito	5,370	55.2
Democratic	Charlie DiPalma	4,359	44.8
Total votes		9,729	100.0

Republican primary
Party	Candidate	Votes	%
Republican	Ron Ferguson	6,734	100.0
Total votes		6,734	100.0

===== General election results =====
Ohio's 96th House District General Election, 2020
Party	Candidate	Votes	%
Republican	Ron Ferguson	37,347	66.37
Democratic	Richard Olivito	17,104	30.40
Libertarian	Oscar Herrera	1,818	3.23
Total votes		56,269	100.0
Republican gain from Democratic			

==== District 97 ====
===== Primary results =====
Democratic primary
Party	Candidate	Votes	%
Democratic	Alaina Swope	4,139	100.0
Total votes		4,139	100.0

Republican primary
Party	Candidate	Votes	%
Republican	Adam Holmes (incumbent)	7,444	100.0
Total votes		7,444	100.0

===== General election results =====
Ohio's 97th House District General Election, 2020
Party	Candidate	Votes	%
Republican	Adam Holmes (incumbent)	36,924	69.66
Democratic	Alaina Swope	16,079	30.34
Total votes		53,003	100.0
Republican hold			

==== District 98 ====
===== Primary results =====
Democratic primary
Party	Candidate	Votes	%
Democratic	Todd Beegle	4,870	100.0
Total votes		4,870	100.0

Republican primary
Party	Candidate	Votes	%
Republican	Brett Hillyer (incumbent)	7,582	100.0
Total votes		7,582	100.0

===== General election results =====
Ohio's 98th House District General Election, 2020
Party	Candidate	Votes	%
Republican	Brett Hillyer (incumbent)	37,378	75.19
Democratic	Todd Beegle	12,332	24.81
Total votes		49,710	100.0
Republican hold			

==== District 99 ====
===== Primary results =====
Democratic primary
Party	Candidate	Votes	%
Democratic	Richard Dana	5,836	100.0
Total votes		5,836	100.0

Republican primary
Party	Candidate	Votes	%
Republican	Sarah Fowler	7,413	100.0
Total votes		7,413	100.0

===== General election results =====
Ohio's 99th House District General Election, 2020
Party	Candidate	Votes	%
Republican	Sarah Fowler	28,918	58.51
Democratic	Richard Dana	20,356	41.19
Independent	Kyle Bruckman (Write-in)	150	0.30
Total votes		49,274	100.0
Republican gain from Democratic			

== See also ==
- 2020 Ohio elections
