= Diane Mullins =

American politician

State Representative

Member of the Ohio House of Representatives from the 47th district
- Incumbent
- Assumed office January 1, 2025
- Preceded by: Sara Carruthers

Personal details
- Party: Republican
- Spouse: Jim Mullins
- Education: Miami University

Diane Mullins is an American politician, pastor, and community activist who is a Republican member of the Ohio House of Representatives, representing the 47th district.

== Personal life and education ==
Mullins serves as a pastor at Calvary Church in Hamilton, Ohio alongside her husband. She graduated from Miami University. She is the founder of Deborah's Voice, a Christian advocacy group focused on women's issues.

== Political career ==
Mullins ran in the 2020 Ohio House of Representatives election, but lost in the Republican primary to Thomas Hall.

She was later elected in the 2024 Ohio House of Representatives election. She defeated incumbent Sara Carruthers in the Republican primary. Her district is based in Butler County and includes the communities of Hamilton and Oxford. Mullins is vice chair of the House Community Revitalization Committee, and a member of the Agriculture, Financial Institutions, and Medicaid Committees.

=== Abortion ===
Mullins stated that she is against abortion in most circumstances.

=== Gun control ===
Mullins is a supporter of the Second Amendment and criticized her primary opponent in 2024 for being too lax on the Second Amendment.

=== Transgender rights ===
Mullins opposes transgender women in sports.

== Electoral history ==
2024 Ohio House of Representatives general election results, District 47
Party	Candidate	Votes	%
Republican	Diane Mullins	29,643	61.61
Democratic	Vanessa Cummings	18,470	38.39
Total votes		48,113	100.0

2024 Ohio House of Representatives primary election results, District 47
Party	Candidate	Votes	%
Republican	Diane Mullins	5,413	53.17
Republican	Sara Carruthers (incumbent)	4,768	46.83
Total votes		10,181	100.0

2020 Ohio House of Representatives primary election results, District 53
Party	Candidate	Votes	%
Republican	Thomas Hall	3,507	44.57
Republican	Diane Mullins	3,001	38.14
Republican	Brett Guido	1,360	17.29
Total votes		7,868	100.0
