= Jennifer Gross (politician) =

American politician

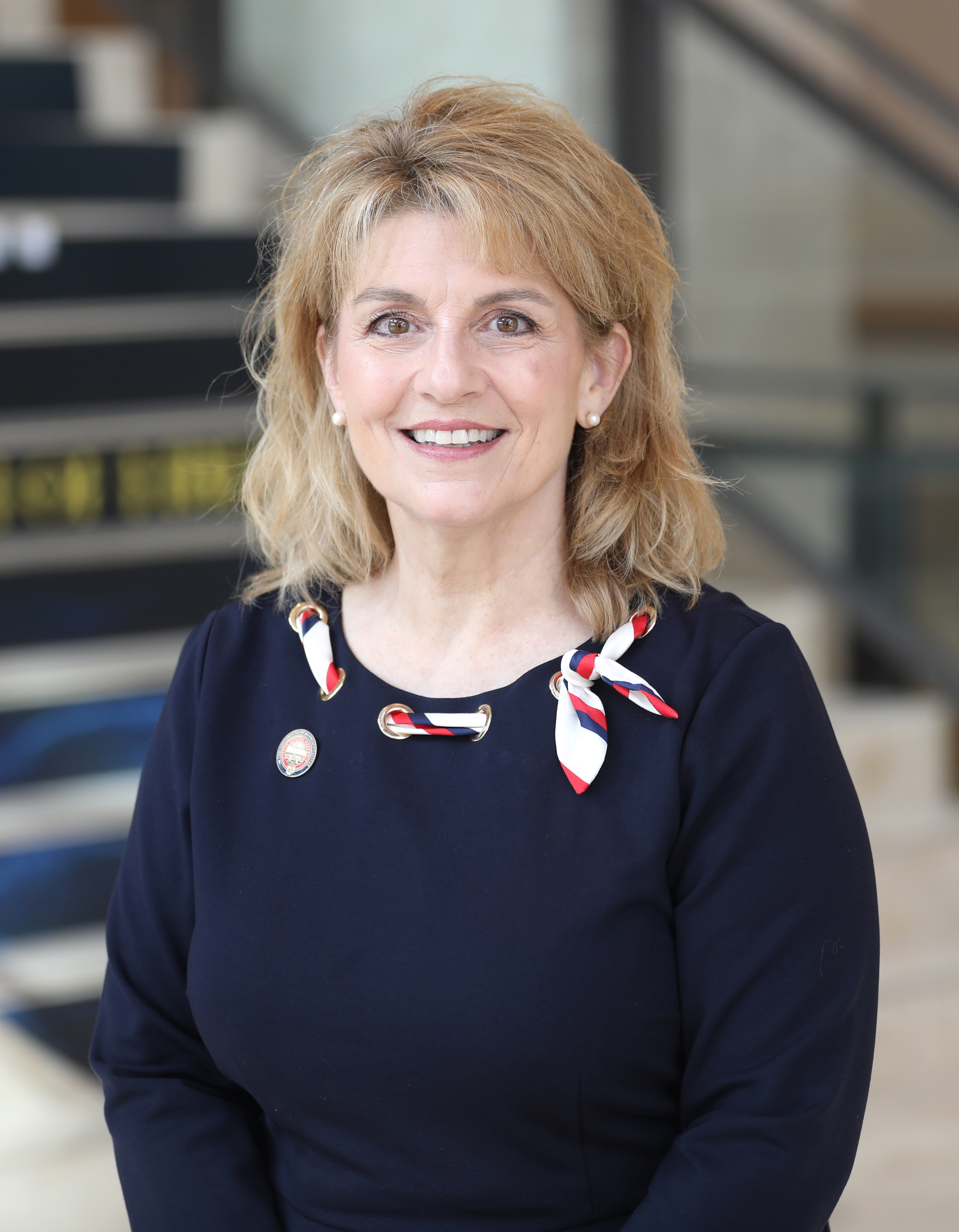
- Gross at the 2024 Young Americans for Liberty Convention

Member of the Ohio House of Representatives
- Incumbent
- Assumed office January 3, 2023
- Preceded by: Lisa Sobecki
- Constituency: 45th district
- In office January 4, 2021 – December 31, 2022
- Preceded by: George Lang
- Succeeded by: Gayle Manning
- Constituency: 52nd district

Personal details
- Born: June 7, 1964 (age 62)
- Party: Republican
- Spouse: Chris

Military service
- Allegiance: United States
- Branch/service: United States Air Force
- Years of service: 1987–2008
- Rank: Lieutenant Colonel
- Battles/wars: Gulf War

Jennifer Lynn Sherwood Gross (born June 7, 1964) is an American politician and former nurse serving as a member of the Ohio House of Representatives from the 45th district. Elected in 2020, she took office in 2021. During her tenure in the state House, she has been a leading supporter of anti-vaccine legislation. Her voting record has shown a general tendency towards big government. She has promoted white supremacist Nick Fuentes via social media.

== Vote on expulsion of Larry Householder ==
On June 16, 2021, the Ohio House of Representatives voted to expel former Speaker Larry Householder following his indictment in the Ohio nuclear bribery scandal, which centered on the passage of House Bill 6. The resolution to expel Householder passed by an overwhelming margin, though a small number of lawmakers voted against removing him from office.

According to reporting by the Dayton Daily News, Jennifer Gross, a Republican representing West Chester Township, was among the legislators who voted against expulsion. The newspaper also reported that Gross stated that Householder “should have stayed in office.”

== Career ==
Gross served as a United States Air Force lieutenant colonel and worked as a nurse practitioner with IMA, Inc. She spent 21 years in military service, nine of those years active and 12 in reserve. Gross is a nurse practitioner. When Ohio shut down for the pandemic in spring of 2020, Gross filed for unemployment. Afterwards, she was hired to perform COVID-19 tests. Afterwards, she was part of an Eli Lilly study on monoclonal antibodies.

=== Ohio House of Representatives ===
==== Campaign ====
Running for the open seat in the 45th House District for the Ohio House of Representatives, she and her Republican primary opponent Mark Welch were both anti-abortion conservatives and supporters of Donald Trump. In the November 2020 general election, Gross defeated Democrat Chuck Horn with 63% of the vote. As a representative, she said she supports the three Christian "B's," or "businesses, babies, and bullets."

==== Tenure ====
In January 2021, Gross said that she opposes the nuclear bailout in House Bill 6 for having "too much baggage."

In February 2021, she held a political event at Holtman's Donuts at West Chester. Ultimately, when attendees violated state COVID-19 protocols, police were called by the restaurant to end the event. Gross criticized the police response, although she did note she and some of the 20 attendees had been walking in the restaurant without masks in violation of state protocols, and that they had not warned the venue ahead of time about the event.

===== Anti-vaccination legislation =====
In 2021, during the COVID-19 pandemic in Idaho, Gross was the primary sponsor of an anti-vaccine bill that would prohibit employers (both public and private) from requiring workers to receive vaccinations (for any disease). The bill, supported by anti-vaccination interest groups, would "prohibits people, public officials, governments, day-care centers, nursing homes, health care providers, insurers, and others from mandating vaccination or requesting people to do so." The bill would also repeal a state law that requires college students to disclose whether they received the hepatitis B vaccine and meningococcal meningitis vaccine. The measure (House Bill 248) was co-sponsored by 16 House Republicans. Gross described the bill as "a freedom bill" and "not a scientific bill" and framed it as a way to stop "discrimination."

When introducing the legislation in May 2021, Gross attracted controversy when she described businesses requiring vaccination as "eerily similar" to the Holocaust and Nazis forcing Jews to wear identifying badges, and likened the vaccine to Nazi human experimentation. Gross's remarks were condemned by the Anti-Defamation League, which said that they would "normalize dangerous rhetoric while diluting the true horrors of Nazi Germany and insulting the memories of the millions brutalized and murdered by Nazis" and added that "Comparing efforts to save the lives of Ohioans during this pandemic to Nazis is unconscionable." When asked in a separate interview with the Ohio Capital Journal about how the vaccine requirements and the Holocaust were similar, Gross declined to comment.

At Gross' insistence, Republican state lawmakers invited Sherri Tenpenny, an osteopathic physician best known for claiming COVID-19 vaccines cause people to become magnetic, to testify an "expert witness" to the Ohio House Health Committee. At the conspiracy theory-filled hearing, Gross told Tenpenny that it was "an honor to have you here" before Tenpenny gave testimony claiming that COVID-19 vaccines 'magnetize' people and create 5G "interfaces," claiming the vaccinated "can put a key on their forehead, it sticks. They can put spoons and forks all over them and they can stick, because now we think there's a metal piece to that." All of these claims are false.

Gross's bill was strongly opposed by healthcare providers, hospitals, and others, who cited the risks of the bill to public health and to children. The bill was also criticized by business leaders such as the Ohio Chamber of Commerce, Ohio Manufacturers Association, and others who cited the risk of low vaccination rates to the state's economy. Gross's legislation was also opposed by Democrats; for example, Representative Beth Liston said that the legislation was "a dangerous bill that will lead to death" and, if enacted, would lead to "worsening measles outbreaks, meningitis in the dorms, and children once again suffering from polio."

In June 2021, the Ohio House Health Committee lacked the votes to advance Gross' bill. Gross discussed the measure with Speaker Bob Cupp and said she planned to introduce amendments. The bill was again debated in August 2021.

In September 2021, text messages between Gross and Representative Scott Lipps, the chairman of the House Health Committee, were obtained by the Cincinnati Enquirer through a public records request. The messages show the pair's behind-the-scenes efforts to advance the bill. In the messages, Gross and Lipps closely coordinate, but at times Lipps appeared frustrated, accusing Gross of failing to control rumors circulating among anti-vaccination activists and of coordinating with Candice Keller, a far-right Republican who has promoted anti-vaccine disinformation and threatened to generate a primary challenger to Lipps.

===== Abortion =====
In November 2023, after Ohio voters approved a measure that would enshrine reproductive rights in the state's constitution, Gross was one of several Republicans who claimed that "[t]o prevent mischief by pro-abortion courts with Issue 1, Ohio legislators will consider removing jurisdiction from the judiciary over this ambiguous ballot initiative. The Ohio legislature alone will consider what, if any, modifications to make to existing laws". She added, without evidence, that the result was "foreign election interference, and it will not stand."

===== Weather =====
In October 2024, Gross promoted the theory that the government can control the weather and the Biden administration is directing storms to Republican areas.

===== Witchcraft =====
On December 1, 2022, Gross invited a local "associate pastor" to cast out witchcraft from the statehouse.

===== Dinosaurs =====
On February 15, 2025, when asked how long ago did dinosaurs roam the earth, Gross responded, “probably 2,000” years ago. She explained that she's a "young earth person."

=== Committee assignments ===
As of June 2026, Gross serves on the following committees in the Ohio House.

- Medicaid (chair)
- Community Revitalization
- Government Oversight
- Health

== Personal life ==
She lives in West Chester, Ohio. She has a husband and two sons.

== See also ==
- 2020 Ohio House of Representatives election
