= 2020 Ohio Senate election =

- November 3, 2020

16 seats from even-numbered districts in the Ohio Senate 17 seats needed for a majority
- Turnout: 74.0% (▲2.7pp) (Note: Compared to 2016, the last time these seats were up.)
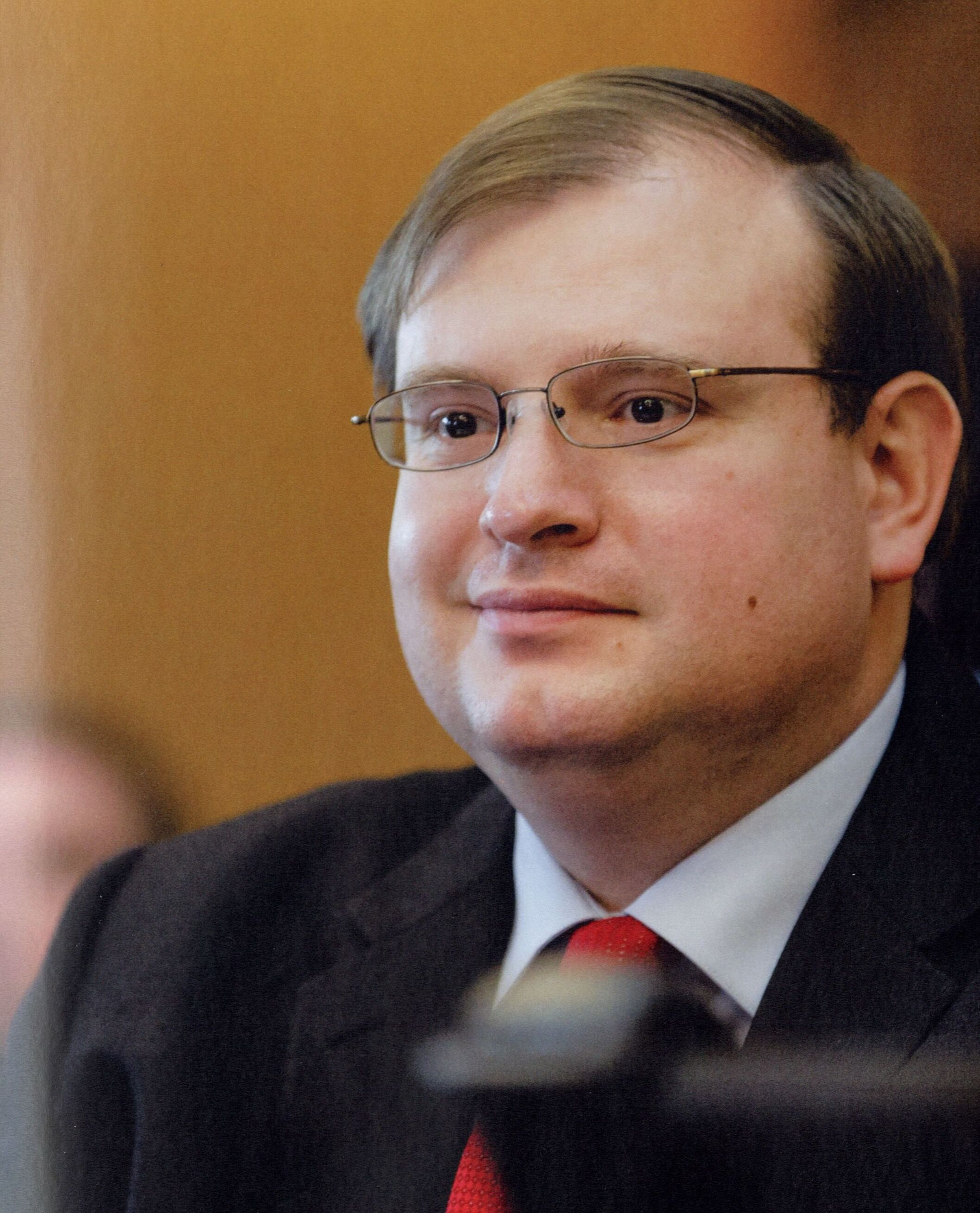

	Majority party	Minority party
Leader	Larry Obhof	Kenny Yuko
Party	Republican	Democratic
Leader since	January 3, 2019	April 26, 2017
Leader's seat	District 22	District 25
Seats before	24	9
Seats after	25	8
Seat change	▲1	▼1
Popular vote	1,754,433	1,097,400
Percentage	61.47%	38.45%
Swing	▼5.14%	▲5.07%
- Results; Republican hold Republican gain Democratic hold No election
President of the Ohio Senate before election
Larry Obhof
Republican
Elected President of the Ohio Senate
Matt Huffman
Republican

The 2020 Ohio Senate election was held on November 3, 2020, with the primary election held on April 28, 2020. (Note: The primary election was originally scheduled for March 17, 2020. As a result of the ongoing COVID-19 pandemic, Governor Mike DeWine announced that the primary would be moved to June 2. Shortly thereafter, the Ohio General Assembly passed a bill setting an almost entirely vote-by-mail primary for April 28.) Ohio voters elected state senators in the 16 even-numbered Ohio Senate districts. State senators elected in 2020 will be eligible to serve a four-year term beginning January 2021 and ending December 2024. These elections coincided with elections for U.S. President and the Ohio House.

Although Democrats had hoped to break the Republican supermajority in the chamber (which would have required them to pick up three seats), they ended up losing one, further consolidating Republican control.

== Predictions ==
Source	Ranking	As of
The Cook Political Report	Likely R	October 21, 2020

== Statewide results ==
Party	Candidates	Votes			Seats Won		
Party	Candidates	No.	%	+/–	No.	+/–	%
Republican Party	16	1,754,433	61.48	▼5.14	15	▲1	93.75
Democratic Party	16	1,097,400	38.45	▲5.07	1	▼1	6.25
Independent	2	1,950	0.07	▲0.07	0	0	0.00
Total		2,853,783	100.00		16		100.00

Popular vote
Republican	61.48%
Democratic	38.45%
Independent	0.07%

Senate seats won
Republican	93.75%
Democratic	6.25%

=== Close races ===
Seats where the margin of victory was under 10%:

1. District 16, 0.06%
2. District 32, 2% (gain)
3. District 6, 6.34%
4. District 24, 8.68%

== Results by district ==
=== Overview ===
Results of the 2020 Ohio Senate election
District	Incumbent status	Incumbent	Winner	Result
2nd	Running	Theresa Gavarone		Incumbent Republican re-elected
4th	Term-limited	Bill Coley	George Lang	Republican hold
6th	Term-limited	Peggy Lehner	Niraj Antani	Republican hold
8th	Running	Louis Blessing		Incumbent Republican re-elected
10th	Running	Bob Hackett		Incumbent Republican re-elected
12th	Running	Matt Huffman		Incumbent Republican re-elected
14th	Running	Terry Johnson		Incumbent Republican re-elected
16th	Running	Stephanie Kunze		Incumbent Republican re-elected
18th	Term-limited	John Eklund	Jerry Cirino	Republican hold
20th	Running	Tim Schaffer		Incumbent Republican re-elected
22nd	Term-limited	Larry Obhof	Mark Romanchuk	Republican hold
24th	Running	Matt Dolan		Incumbent Republican re-elected
26th	Term-limited	David Burke	Bill Reineke	Republican hold
28th	Running	Vernon Sykes		Incumbent Democrat re-elected
30th	Running	Frank Hoagland		Incumbent Republican re-elected
32nd	Running	Sean O'Brien	Sandra O'Brien	Republican gain

=== Detailed results ===
==== District 2 ====
===== Primary results =====
Democratic primary
Party	Candidate	Votes	%
Democratic	Joel O'Dorisio	12,170	52.2
Democratic	Reem Subei	11,162	47.8
Total votes		23,332	100.0

Republican primary
Party	Candidate	Votes	%
Republican	Theresa Gavarone (incumbent)	17,352	100.0
Total votes		17,352	100.0

===== General election results =====
Ohio's 2nd Senate District General Election, 2020
Party	Candidate	Votes	%
Republican	Theresa Gavarone (incumbent)	122,084	62.2
Democratic	Joel O'Dorisio	74,240	37.8
Total votes		196,324	100.0
Republican hold		Swing	▼4.2

==== District 4 ====
===== Primary results =====
Democratic primary
Party	Candidate	Votes	%
Democratic	Kathy Wyenandt	12,568	100.0
Total votes		12,568	100.0

Republican primary
Party	Candidate	Votes	%
Republican	George Lang	12,579	49.4
Republican	Candice Keller	8,318	32.7
Republican	Lee Wong	4,568	17.9
Total votes		25,465	100.0

===== General election results =====
Ohio's 4th Senate District General Election, 2020
Party	Candidate	Votes	%
Republican	George Lang	106,021	60.5
Democratic	Kathy Wyenandt	68,000	38.8
Independent	Kent Keller (write-in)	1,126	0.6
Total votes		175,147	100.0
Republican hold		Swing	▼7.1

==== District 6 ====
===== Primary results =====
Democratic primary
Party	Candidate	Votes	%
Democratic	Mark Fogel	16,867	82.2
Democratic	Albert Griggs, Jr.	3,643	17.8
Total votes		20,510	100.0

Republican primary
Party	Candidate	Votes	%
Republican	Niraj Antani	14,866	64.4
Republican	Rachel Selby	5,317	23.1
Republican	Gregory Alan Robinson	2,885	12.5
Total votes		23,068	100.0

===== General election results =====
Ohio's 6th Senate District General Election, 2020
Party	Candidate	Votes	%
Republican	Niraj Antani	99,096	53.2
Democratic	Mark Fogel	87,280	46.8
Total votes		186,376	100.0
Republican hold		Swing	▼14.9

==== District 8 ====
===== Primary results =====
Democratic primary
Party	Candidate	Votes	%
Democratic	Daniel Brown	18,091	100.0
Total votes		18,091	100.0

Republican primary
Party	Candidate	Votes	%
Republican	Louis Blessing (incumbent)	20,544	100.0
Total votes		20,544	100.0

===== General election results =====
Ohio's 8th Senate District General Election, 2020
Party	Candidate	Votes	%
Republican	Louis Blessing (incumbent)	112,313	60.1
Democratic	Daniel Brown	74,565	39.9
Total votes		186,878	100.0
Republican hold		Swing	▼2.8

==== District 10 ====
===== Primary results =====
Democratic primary
Party	Candidate	Votes	%
Democratic	Charles Ballard	16,232	100.0
Total votes		16,232	100.0

Republican primary
Party	Candidate	Votes	%
Republican	Bob Hackett (incumbent)	29,116	100.0
Total votes		29,116	100.0

===== General Election Results =====
Ohio's 10th Senate District General Election, 2020
Party	Candidate	Votes	%
Republican	Bob Hackett (incumbent)	109,456	65.3
Democratic	Charles Ballard	58,126	34.7
Total votes		167,582	100.0
Republican hold		Swing	▲0.2

==== District 12 ====
===== Primary results =====
Democratic primary
Party	Candidate	Votes	%
Democratic	Ken Poling	10,900	100.0
Total votes		10,900	100.0

Republican primary
Party	Candidate	Votes	%
Republican	Matt Huffman (incumbent)	33,710	100.0
Total votes		33,710	100.0

===== General Election Results =====
79.3

Ohio's 12th Senate District General Election, 2020
Party	Candidate	Votes	%
Republican	Matt Huffman (incumbent)	129,218	
Democratic	Ken Poling	33,800	20.7
Total votes		164,018	100.0
Republican hold		Swing	▼20.7 (Note: Seat was uncontested in the previous election.)

==== District 14 ====
===== Primary results =====
Democratic primary
Party	Candidate	Votes	%
Democratic	Ryan Ottney	13,060	100.0
Total votes		13,060	100.0

Republican primary
Party	Candidate	Votes	%
Republican	Terry Johnson (incumbent)	29,928	76.3
Republican	David Uible	9,278	23.7
Total votes		39,206	100.0

===== General Election Results =====
Ohio's 14th Senate District General Election, 2020
Party	Candidate	Votes	%
Republican	Terry Johnson (incumbent)	127,588	72.7
Democratic	Ryan Ottney	47,843	27.3
Total votes		175,431	100.0
Republican hold		Swing	▲0.8

==== District 16 ====
===== Primary results =====
Democratic primary
Party	Candidate	Votes	%
Democratic	Crystal Lett	23,349	78.8
Democratic	Troy Doucet	4,389	14.8
Democratic	Mark Bailey	1,880	6.4
Total votes		29,618	100.0

Republican primary
Party	Candidate	Votes	%
Republican	Stephanie Kunze (incumbent)	13,098	100.0
Total votes		13,098	100.0

===== General Election Results =====
Ohio's 16th Senate District General Election, 2020
Party	Candidate	Votes	%
Republican	Stephanie Kunze (incumbent)	106,053	50.03
Democratic	Crystal Lett	105,937	49.97
Total votes		211,990	100.0
Republican hold		Swing	▼9.0

==== District 18 ====
===== Primary results =====
Democratic primary
Party	Candidate	Votes	%
Democratic	Betsy Rader	23,183	100.0
Total votes		23,183	100.0

Republican primary
Party	Candidate	Votes	%
Republican	Jerry Cirino	23,690	100.0
Total votes		23,690	100.0

===== General Election Results =====
Ohio's 18th Senate District General Election, 2020
Party	Candidate	Votes	%
Republican	Jerry Cirino	115,754	60.5
Democratic	Betsy Rader	75,535	39.5
Total votes		191,289	100.0
Republican hold		Swing	▼4.8

==== District 20 ====
===== Primary results =====
Democratic primary
Party	Candidate	Votes	%
Democratic	Christian Johnson	13,993	100.0
Total votes		13,993	100.0

Republican primary
Party	Candidate	Votes	%
Republican	Tim Schaffer (incumbent)	25,458	100.0
Total votes		25,458	100.0

===== General Election Results =====
Ohio's 20th Senate District General Election, 2020
Party	Candidate	Votes	%
Republican	Tim Schaffer (incumbent)	121,844	69.5
Democratic	Christian Johnson	53,477	30.5
Total votes		175,321	100.0
Republican hold		Swing	▼30.5 (Note: Seat was uncontested in the previous election.)

==== District 22 ====
===== Primary results =====
Democratic primary
Party	Candidate	Votes	%
Democratic	Steve Johnson	16,506	100.0
Total votes		16,506	100.0

Republican primary
Party	Candidate	Votes	%
Republican	Mark Romanchuk	17,629	58.3
Republican	Ron Falconi	6,909	22.8
Republican	Cory Branham	3,701	12.2
Republican	Michael Reynolds	1,289	4.3
Republican	Timothy Hoven	726	2.4
Total votes		30,254	100.0

===== General Election Results =====
Ohio's 22nd Senate District General Election, 2020
Party	Candidate	Votes	%
Republican	Mark Romanchuk	130,273	68.9
Democratic	Ryan Hunger (Note: Hunger replaced Johnson after the latter withdrew from the race after the primary due to health concerns.)	58,924	31.1
Total votes		189,197	100.0
Republican hold		Swing	▼0.9

==== District 24 ====
===== Primary results =====
Democratic primary
Party	Candidate	Votes	%
Democratic	Tom Jackson	28,496	100.0
Total votes		28,496	100.0

Republican primary
Party	Candidate	Votes	%
Republican	Matt Dolan (incumbent)	18,161	100.0
Total votes		18,161	100.0

===== General Election Results =====
Ohio's 24th Senate District General Election, 2020
Party	Candidate	Votes	%
Republican	Matt Dolan (Incumbent)	112,609	54.3
Democratic	Tom Jackson	94,633	45.7
Total votes		207,242	100.0
Republican hold		Swing	▼3.8

==== District 26 ====
===== Primary results =====
Democratic primary
Party	Candidate	Votes	%
Democratic	Craig Swartz	14,208	100.0
Total votes		14,208	100.0

Republican primary
Party	Candidate	Votes	%
Republican	Bill Reineke	25,363	64.7
Republican	Melissa Ackison	13,864	35.3
Total votes		39,227	100.0

===== General Election Results =====
Ohio's 26th Senate District General Election, 2020
Party	Candidate	Votes	%
Republican	Bill Reineke	114,776	70.6
Democratic	Craig Swartz	47,050	28.9
Independent	Robert Taylor (write-in)	824	0.5
Total votes		162,650	100.0
Republican hold		Swing	▼29.4 (Note: Seat was uncontested in the previous election.)

==== District 28 ====
===== Primary results =====
Democratic primary
Party	Candidate	Votes	%
Democratic	Vernon Sykes (incumbent)	24,995	100.0
Total votes		24,995	100.0

Republican primary
Party	Candidate	Votes	%
Republican	Michael Downey	8,626	100.0
Total votes		8,626	100.0

===== General Election Results =====
Ohio's 28th Senate District General Election, 2020
Party	Candidate	Votes	%
Democratic	Vernon Sykes (incumbent)	88,929	59.8
Republican	Michael Downey	59,701	40.2
Total votes		148,630	100.0
Democratic hold		Swing	▼1.4

==== District 30 ====
===== Primary results =====
Democratic primary
Party	Candidate	Votes	%
Democratic	Michael Fletcher	19,731	100.0
Total votes		19,731	100.0

Republican primary
Party	Candidate	Votes	%
Republican	Frank Hoagland (incumbent)	24,726	100.0
Total votes		24,726	100.0

===== General Election Results =====
Ohio's 30th Senate District General Election, 2020
Party	Candidate	Votes	%
Republican	Frank Hoagland (incumbent)	110,243	66.8
Democratic	Michael Fletcher	54.694	33.2
Total votes		164,937	100.0
Republican hold		Swing	▲13.9

==== District 32 ====
===== Primary results =====
Democratic primary
Party	Candidate	Votes	%
Democratic	Sean O'Brien (incumbent)	26,151	100.0
Total votes		26,151	100.0

Republican primary
Party	Candidate	Votes	%
Republican	Sandra O'Brien	13,519	69.3
Republican	Kenneth Polke	5,983	30.7
Total votes		19,502	100.0

===== General Election Results =====
Ohio's 32nd Senate District General Election, 2020
Party	Candidate	Votes	%
Republican	Sandra O'Brien	77,404	51.0
Democratic	Sean O'Brien (incumbent)	74,367	49.0
Total votes		151,771	100.0
Republican gain from Democratic		Swing	▲7.4

== See also ==
- 2020 Ohio elections
