= Scott Ryan (Ohio politician) =

American politician (born 1965)

Member of the Ohio House of Representatives from the 71st district
- In office January 3, 2015 – November 12, 2019
- Preceded by: Jay Hottinger
- Succeeded by: Mark Fraizer

Personal details
- Born: April 6, 1965 (age 61)
- Party: Republican

Scott K. Ryan (born April 6, 1965) is the former representative for the 71st district of the Ohio House of Representatives. Ryan graduated from Granville High School in 1983. Immediately following, Ryan graduated from Miami University (Ohio) in 1987 with a bachelor's degree in business management. Scott, the son of Bruce and Sue Ryan, has a family himself: his wife Shellie and two daughters. He served as Licking County Treasurer before deciding to run for state representative to succeed Jay Hottinger, who was term-limited. Between Scott Ryan's 2014 and 2016 elections, Ryan raised a total of $365,111. In 2014, Ryan raised $120,235 and in 2016 he raised $244,876. Donations ranged from as low as a couple of dollars, to as high as a mere $25,000 donation. He won the Republican primary handily in 2014 and defeated Ann Rader 67% to 33%, later going on to do the same in 2016 against Joseph Begeny 67.91% to 32.09%. For independent candidates looking to run for the general election in 2018, the filing deadline was May 7, 2018. Scott Ryan (R) and Jeremy Eugene Blake (D) ran against each other in the Ohio House of Representatives District 71 general election on November 6, 2018. Republican candidate, Scott Ryan, won with 61.8% of the votes and will be sworn in in January 2019.

== Early political career ==
While operating his family printing business, Newark Leader Printing Co. – established in 1895, Scott Ryan began to develop relationships with elected officials in crafting and executing their direct mail campaigns. A group of elected officials eventually convinced Scott to seek the office of Licking County Treasurer, where he held office from 2010 to 2014.

A couple of years later, Ryan successfully ran for the Ohio House and was sworn into the 131st General Assembly in January 2015, and later reelected in 2016 for the 132nd General Assembly in 2017 to 2018. Between Scott Ryan's 2014 and 2016 elections, Ryan has raised a total of $365,111. In 2014, Ryan raised $120,235 and in 2016 he raised $244,876.

== House of Representatives ==
Scott Ryan served as the chairman of the Ohio House Finance and Appropriations Committee. In addition, Ryan was the lead sponsor on a few bills that are now currently laws pertaining to the following subjects: child abuse and neglect reporting, reducing costs for local government, providing significant funding and support for mental health / opiate crisis, expanding role for psych certified APRNs to provide access to care for the mentally ill, reducing red tape to reduce response times for infrastructure repair during declared disasters, creating the Ohio Corps, which would develop mentoring relationships between higher education students and at risk teenagers, and the 2018 State Capital budget, which invested over $2 billion in local community projects, and state infrastructure.

=== 2017 legislative session ===
During the 2017 legislative session, Scott Ryan served on a few notable committees:

==== Ohio committee assignments, 2017 ====
Finance, vice chair

Rules and Reference

State and Local Government

Ways and Means

Joint Medicaid Oversight

State Controlling Board
