= Erica Crawley =

American politician from Ohio

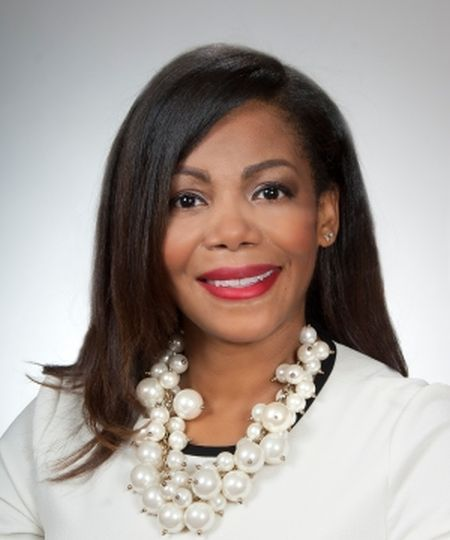

Member of the Franklin County Board of Commissioners
- Incumbent
- Assumed office July 1, 2021
- Preceded by: Marilyn Brown

Member of the Ohio House of Representatives from the 26th district
- In office January 7, 2019 – June 28, 2021
- Preceded by: Hearcel Craig
- Succeeded by: Latyna Humphrey

Personal details
- Born: November 22, 1980 (age 45)
- Party: Democratic
- Education: Cleveland State University (BA); Walden University (MPA); Capital University (JD)
- Occupation: Attorney

Military service
- Allegiance: United States
- Branch/service: United States Navy
- Battles/wars: Operation Iraqi Freedom

Erica Christi Crawley (born November 22, 1980) is an American politician serving as a member of the Franklin County Board of Commissioners. Crawley previously served as a member of the Ohio House of Representatives from 2019 to 2021.

== Career ==
=== Ohio House of Representatives ===
Crawley was elected in the general election on November 6, 2018, winning 82 percent of the vote over 15 percent of Republican candidate Shareeque Arife Sadiq. She was unopposed in the 2020 general election.

Crawley served on the following committees: Armed Services and Veterans Affairs, Finance, Primary and Secondary Education, and the Finance Subcommittee on Primary and Secondary Education.

=== Franklin County commissioner ===
Crawley resigned from the Ohio House of Representatives on June 28, 2021 to fill a vacancy on the Franklin County Board of Commissioners. Following the retirement of longtime county commissioner Marilyn Brown, the Franklin County Democratic Party was allowed to choose her replacement. In a 63–54 vote, it chose Crawley, who was sworn in on July 1, 2021.

== Election history ==
Ohio House 26th District
Year	Democrat	Votes	Pct	Republican	Votes	Pct
2018	Erica Crawley	33,774	82.30%	Shareeque Arife Sadiq	5,982	14.58%
2020	Erica Crawley	45,350	100%	Unopposed		
