= Sara Carruthers =

Ohio State Representative

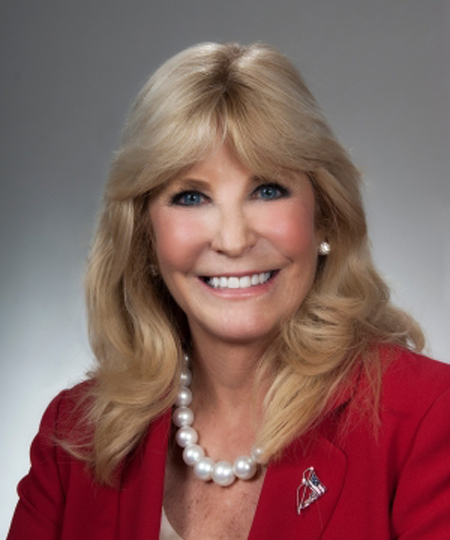

Member of the Ohio House of Representatives from the 47th district
- In office January 3, 2023 – December 31, 2024
- Preceded by: Derek Merrin
- Succeeded by: Diane Mullins

Member of the Ohio House of Representatives from the 51st district
- In office January 7, 2019 – December 31, 2022
- Preceded by: Wes Retherford
- Succeeded by: Brett Hillyer

Personal details
- Born: June 23, 1962 (age 64) Hamilton, Ohio, U.S.
- Party: Republican
- Education: Miami University (BM)

Sara P. Carruthers is a member of the Ohio State Board of Education, and former member of the Ohio House of Representatives representing the 47th district from 2019-2024. A Republican, Carruthers represents portions of southern Butler County. Prior to elected office, Carruthers worked in the media industry, including for WKRC-TV in Cincinnati. She also worked as a press assistant for Ronald Reagan and George H. W. Bush.

== Vote on expulsion of Larry Householder ==
On June 16, 2021, the Ohio House of Representatives voted to expel former Speaker Larry Householder following his indictment in the Ohio nuclear bribery scandal, which centered on the passage of House Bill 6. The resolution to expel Householder passed by an overwhelming margin, though a small group of lawmakers voted against removal.

According to reporting by the Dayton Daily News, Sara Carruthers, a Republican representing Hamilton, voted against expulsion. The newspaper reported that Carruthers said she believed expulsion was premature and that Householder should be afforded due process, stating that she did not think lawmakers should remove a member before a criminal conviction.

== Education ==
Carruthers attended Miami University. Carruthers is a member of the Delta Zeta sorority.

== Career ==
In 2018, Carruthers successfully ran in the Republican primary against state Representative Wes Retherford, who had been arrested for drunk driving. She easily won the general election.

In 2019, it was found that Carruthers was sued for an alleged fraud case surrounding when she adopted twins more than a decade ago but failed to live up to a promise that she would provide a home for the birth mother and her three children. Despite an audio recording of Carruthers admitting to the allegations, she claimed it was an extortion attempt.

In 2022, Carruthers gained attention during her run for the newly drawn 47th State House District when her democratic opponent, 19-year-old Miami University student Sam Lawrence, announced his campaign and gained notoriety. Carruthers beat Real Estate Agent Cody Harper in the Republican primary and won against Lawrence in the general election.

In 2024, Carruthers ran for re-election in the Ohio House of Representatives election. She lost the Republican primary election to Diane Mullins, a pastor who ran a campaign to the right of Carruthers.

== Electoral history ==
Ohio House of Representatives District 51 : Results 2018-2020
Year	Republican	Votes	Pct	Democrat	Votes	Pct	Other	Votes	Pct
2018	Sara P. Carruthers	22,039	59.78%	Susan Vaugn	14,825	40.22%			
2020	Sara P. Carruthers	35,533	93.39%				Johnny Hamilton	2,514	6.61%

Ohio House of Representatives District 47 : Results 2022
Year	Republican	Votes	Pct	Democrat	Votes	Pct	Other	Votes	Pct
2022	Sara P. Carruthers	21,663	65.20%	Sam Lawrence	11,565	34.80%			
