= Latyna Humphrey =

American politician

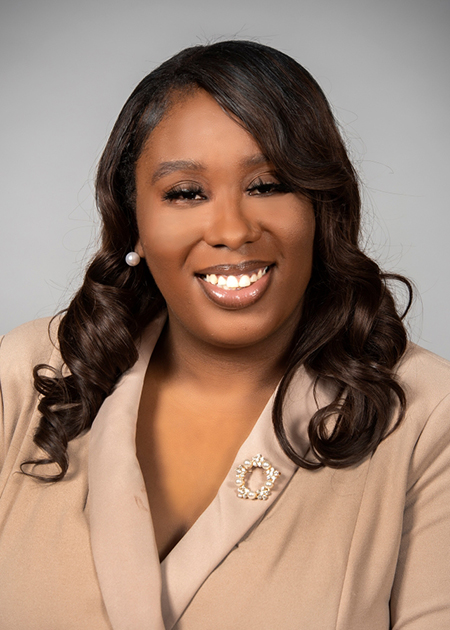

Member of the Ohio House of Representatives from the 2nd district
- Incumbent
- Assumed office January 3, 2023
- Preceded by: Marilyn John

Member of the Ohio House of Representatives from the 26th district
- In office October 13, 2021 – December 31, 2022
- Preceded by: Erica Crawley
- Succeeded by: Sedrick Denson

Personal details
- Born: Columbus, Ohio, U.S.
- Party: Democratic
- Education: Columbus State Community College (AA); Franklin University (BS)

Latyna M. Humphrey is an American politician serving as a member of the Ohio House of Representatives from the 2nd district. She assumed office on October 13, 2021.

== Early life and education ==
Humphrey was born in Columbus, Ohio and attended Columbus East High School. She earned an Associate of Arts degree from Columbus State Community College and attended Franklin University and sought a Bachelor of Science in applied psychology from Franklin University.

== Career ==
Humphrey began her official career in the banking industry. Latyna, started off as a bank teller at PNC Financial Services from 2014-2015. Then, from 2016 to 2019-- she worked at Huntington National Bank in the Residential Estate Technical Services Department. From 2019 to 2021, she served as Community Relations for the Franklin County Auditor's Office of Mr. Michael Stinziano. She also served as a bailiff in the Ohio Court of Common Pleas for the Honorable Judge Carl Aveni. From February 2018 until 2021, Humphrey has served as the first female the president and CEO of the Central Ohio Young Black Democrats. In 2021, she became the secretary of the Franklin County Democratic Party's Central Committee. Humphrey is also a Two-time author and public speaker. Humphrey has spoken at Columbia University, The Ohio State University, Hampton University, Brooklyn College, National Society of Leadership & Success plus more and has featured in many national publications. She was appointed to the Ohio House of Representatives in October 2021, succeeding Erica Crawley.
