= Monique Smith (Ohio politician) =

American politician

Member of the Ohio House of Representatives from the 16th district
- In office January 1, 2021 – December 31, 2022
- Preceded by: Dave Greenspan
- Succeeded by: Bride Rose Sweeney

Personal details
- Party: Democratic
- Education: Ohio State University

Monique Smith is a former Democratic member of the Ohio House of Representatives, who represented the 16th district. She was elected in 2020, defeating Republican incumbent Dave Greenspan with just under 51% of the vote in a district where Joe Biden defeated Donald Trump by 13%.
