= Lisa Sobecki =

American politician from Ohio

Member of the Ohio House of Representatives from the 45th District
- In office January 7, 2019 – January 1, 2023
- Preceded by: Teresa Fedor

Personal details
- Born: June 30, 1967 (age 59)
- Party: Democratic
- Education: University of Wisconsin–Madison (BA)
- Occupation: Labor leader

Lisa Ann Sobecki (born June 30, 1967) is an American politician who currently serves as a member of the Lucas County Commission. She served as a state representative for the 45th district, which includes portions of Lucas County, as a Democrat. Sobecki is a former member of the Toledo Board of Education.

== Ohio House of Representatives ==
=== Election ===
Sobecki was elected to her first term on November 6, 2018, winning 64% of the vote, compared to 36% for her Republican opponent David Davenport.

=== Committees ===
Sobecki serves on the following committees: Economic and Workforce Development, Primary and Secondary Education, State and Local Government, Ways and Means, and the Joint Education Oversight Committee.

== Election history ==
Ohio House 45th District
Year	Democrat	Votes	Pct	Republican	Votes	Pct
2018	Lisa Sobecki	21,375	64.0%	David Davenport	12,042	36.0%
