= Mark Romanchuk =

American politician (born 1962)

Mark J. Romanchuk
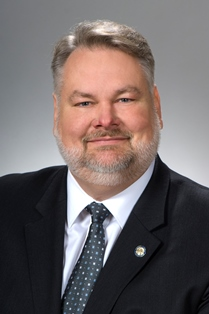

Member of the Ohio Senate from the 22nd district
- Incumbent
- Assumed office January 4, 2021
- Preceded by: Larry Obhof

Member of the Ohio House of Representatives from the 2nd district
- In office January 1, 2013 – December 31, 2020
- Preceded by: Jay Goyal
- Succeeded by: Marilyn John

Personal details
- Born: September 22, 1962 (age 63) Mansfield, Ohio, U.S.
- Party: Republican
- Education: DeVry University (BS); Vanderbilt University (MBA)

Mark James Romanchuk (born September 22, 1962) is an American politician serving as a member of the Ohio Senate from the 22nd district. Romanchuk is a member of the Republican Party.

== Early life and education ==
Romanchuk was born in Mansfield, Ohio and is a graduate of Ontario High School. He earned a Bachelor of Science degree in electronic engineering technology from DeVry University and his MBA from Vanderbilt University.

== Career ==
Romanchuk is the Owner of PR Machine Works and vice president of Slick Automated Solutions, both located in Ontario, Ohio. Prior to his business ownership, Romanchuk served as a civilian engineering adviser to the United States Navy regarding the F-18 aircraft. Romanchuk was then assigned to Votkinsk in the former USSR in a diplomatic capacity to oversee implementation of the INF Treaty.

Romanchuk is a member of the National Tooling and Machining Association, the NFIB, the Ohio Manufacturers' Association and served on the Ohio Skills Bank development council.

=== Ohio House of Representatives ===
Romanchuk was elected to the Ohio House of Representatives position in 2012 by garnering 57.23% of the vote against Democratic challenger, Ellen Haring.

Romanchuk was appointed vice chair of the House Manufacturing and Workforce Development Committee, which was created in the 130th General Assembly. He was also appointed to the House Public Utilities Committee and the House Insurance Committee.

==== Trump Nobel Peace Prize nomination ====
On November 13, 2018, Romanchuk introduced Ohio House Resolution 31 calling for President Donald Trump to be nominated for a Nobel Peace Prize. The resolution claimed that North Korea ended its ballistic missile and nuclear weapons program on April 20, 2018, after Trump implemented international sanctions on the regime.

=== Abortion rights ===
In 2019, Romanchuk co-sponsored legislation that would ban abortion in Ohio and criminalize what they called "abortion murder". Doctors who performed abortions in cases of ectopic pregnancy and other life-threatening conditions would be exempt from prosecution only if they "[took] all possible steps to preserve the life of the unborn child, while preserving the life of the woman. Such steps include, if applicable, attempting to reimplant an ectopic pregnancy into the woman's uterus". Reimplantation of an ectopic pregnancy is not a recognized or medically feasible procedure.

== Electoral history ==
Ohio House of Representatives 2nd District
Year	Democrat	Votes	Pct	Republican	Votes	Pct	Other	Votes	Pct
2012	Ellen Haring	23,532	42.77%	Mark Romanchuk	31,482	57.23%			
2014	Don Bryant	9,649	30.09%	Mark Romanchuk	22,422	69.91%			
2016	Brittany Bowman	15,725	30.28%	Mark Romanchuk	36,186	69.68%	Tim Grady (write-in)	20	0.04%
2018	Lane J. Winters	13,317	30.12%	Mark Romanchuk	29,824	67.45%	Tim Grady (Libertarian)	1,072	2.42%

Ohio Senate 22nd District
Year	Democrat	Votes	Pct	Republican	Votes	Pct	Other	Votes	Pct
2020	Ryan Hunger	58,924	31.14%	Mark Romanchuk	130,273	68.86%			
2024	Kathy Salem	56,821	31.79%	Mark Romanchuk	121,928	68.21%			
