= Marilyn John =

American politician

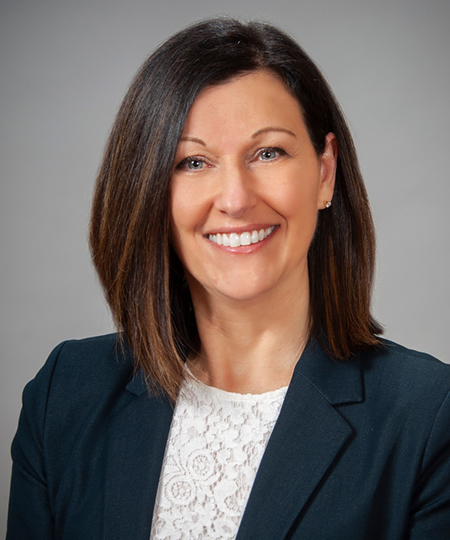

Speaker pro tempore-designate of the Ohio House of Representatives
- Assuming office January 4, 2027
- Succeeding: Gayle Manning

Majority Leader of the Ohio House of Representatives
- Incumbent
- Assumed office January 6, 2025
- Preceded by: Bill Seitz

Member of the Ohio House of Representatives
- Incumbent
- Assumed office January 3, 2023
- Preceded by: Diane Grendell
- Constituency: 76th district
- In office January 4, 2021 – December 31, 2022
- Preceded by: Mark Romanchuk
- Succeeded by: Latyna Humphrey
- Constituency: 2nd district

Personal details
- Born: Shelby, Ohio, U.S.
- Party: Republican
- Spouse: Kevin (m. 1995)
- Children: 2
- Education: North Central State College (attended); Ashland University (BA, MBA)

Marilyn S. John is an American politician serving as a member of the Ohio House of Representatives from the 76th district. John previously served as the mayor of Shelby, Ohio and was a Richland County Commissioner.

== Early life and education ==
Growing up, John was encouraged to participate in politics by her family while attending Plymouth High School. After graduating, she enrolled in an associate's program at North Central State College and an MBA program at Ashland University. She later founded the Leader Richland Program to prepare elementary school students for a college setting. In recognition of her efforts, John was the recipient of the 2019 OACC Distinguished Alumnus Award.

== Career ==
After earning her MBA, John began working as an underwriter at Shelby Insurance Company and as the executive director of the Shelby Senior Center. She was then elected Mayor of Shelby, Ohio after defeating Cohen Lewis and Bill Freytag in the general election with 1,120 votes. During her first term as Mayor, John said she would prioritize improving communications within the administration and between the city and community. She was re-elected for a second term in 2011 before resigning in 2014 to accept her election as Richland County Commissioner. Prior to her resignation, she was the recipient of the Elected Official of the Year Award by the Area Agency on Aging.

During her tenure as Richland County Commissioner, John helped establish a "rainy day" fund, stabilized carryover funds, and created a five-year capital improvements plan. Before her term as Commissioner expired, John was elected to the Ohio House of Representatives on November 3, 2020, after defeating Sam Grady. She assumed office on January 4, 2021.

== Personal life ==
John and her husband Kevin have two children together and attend Crossroads Community Church. While living in Miami County, she taught yoga at a fitness studio for four years.

Ohio House of Representatives
| Preceded by Bill Seitz | Majority Leader of the Ohio House of Representatives; 2025–present | Incumbent |
| Preceded by Gayle Manning | Speaker pro tempore of the Ohio House of Representatives; Taking office 2027 | Designate |
