= Jon Cross (politician) =

American politician (born 1979)

Member of the Ohio House of Representatives from the 83rd district
- In office January 3, 2019 – January 1, 2025
- Preceded by: Robert Sprague

Personal details
- Born: December 7, 1979 (age 46) Kenton, Ohio
- Party: Republican
- Education: Ohio State University

Jon Cross (born December 7, 1979) is a former member of the Ohio House of Representatives. Cross is a Republican.

In 2018, Cross won a Republican primary to succeed Robert Sprague in the Ohio House of Representatives. Cross would then win a general election.

In 2019, Cross co-sponsored legislation that would ban abortion in Ohio and criminalize what they called "abortion murder". Doctors who performed abortions in cases of ectopic pregnancy and other life-threatening conditions would be exempt from prosecution only if they "[took] all possible steps to preserve the life of the unborn child, while preserving the life of the woman. Such steps include, if applicable, attempting to reimplant an ectopic pregnancy into the woman's uterus". Reimplantation of an ectopic pregnancy is not a recognized or medically feasible procedure.

== Links ==
- Representative Jon Cross (official site)
