= Mark Fraizer =

American politician (born 1988)

Member of the Ohio House of Representatives from the 71st District
- In office November 13, 2019 – December 31, 2022
- Preceded by: Scott Ryan
- Succeeded by: Bill Dean

Personal details
- Born: April 18, 1988 (age 38)
- Party: Republican
- Education: Otterbein University

Mark Fraizer (born April 18, 1988) is an American politician who was the Ohio state representative in Ohio's 71st district. He took the seat after Scott Ryan left to join Mike DeWine's administration.

He ran for re–election in 2022 for District 68, but was defeated in the Republican primary by businessman Thaddeus Claggett.
