= Thomas Hall (Ohio politician) =

American politician

Member of the Ohio House of Representatives from the 46th district
- Incumbent
- Assumed office 2023

Member of the U.S. House of Representatives from Ohio's 53rd district
- In office January 1, 2021 – 2023
- Preceded by: Candice Keller

Personal details
- Party: Republican

Thomas Hall is an American politician serving as a member of the Ohio House of Representatives for the 46th district. He was elected in 2020, defeating Democrat Michelle Novak with 68% of the vote. He formerly represented the Ohio House of Representatives for the 53rd district.

A native of Butler County, Hall graduated from Madison High School in 2014 and earned a bachelor's degree in small business management from Miami University. Hall briefly worked in sales and client management, including for LexisNexis Document Solution, and is a part-time volunteer fireman.

Prior to being elected to state house, Hall served two terms as a Madison Township trustee. In 2020, he was elected to the Ohio House of Representatives, becoming the youngest state representative at the age of 25. Hall is chairman of the House Government Oversight Committee, and member to the Energy, Finance, and Public Safety Committees.
