= Scott Lipps (politician) =

American politician

Member of the Ohio House of Representatives from the 55th district
- In office January 3, 2017 – December 31, 2024
- Preceded by: Ron Maag
- Succeeded by: Michelle Teska

Personal details
- Party: Republican
- Children: 2
- Education: College of Wooster (BA); DePaul University (MA)
- Website: https://ohiohouse.gov/members/p-scott-lipps

P. Scott Lipps is an American politician who served in the Ohio House of Representatives from 2017 to 2024, where he represented the 55th district. He is a Republican.

== Life and career ==
Lipps was born in Miamisburg, Ohio, graduating from Miamisburg High School before attending the College of Wooster and DePaul University for his masters.

A small businessman, Lipps opened Sleep Tite Mattress Factory & Showeroom, in Franklin, in 1990.

In 2000, Lipps was elected to the Franklin City Council, where he would serve for sixteen years, including two terms as Mayor of Franklin. He is also involved in several philanthropic and local organizations, including the Masons, Rotary, and Chamber of Commerce.

== Ohio House of Representatives ==
After serving in the local office for over sixteen years, Lipps decided to seek an open seat in the Ohio House of Representatives in 2016. The seat became vacant when Representative Ron Maag was term-limited after four terms. However, he had a competitive Republican primary, winning by just 398 votes over Steve Muterspaw.

In a safely Republican district, Lipps won the 2016 general election over Democrat Samuel Ronan 79% to 21%.

In a safely Republican district, Lipps won re-election in the 2018 general election over Democrat Jim Stanton 74% to 26%.

== Electoral history ==
Election results
Year	Office	Election	Votes for Lipps	%	Opponent	Party	Votes	%
2016	Ohio House of Representatives	General	48,427	78.60%	Samuel Ronan	Democratic	13,184	21.40%
2018	Ohio House of Representatives	General	39,889	73.6%	Jim Staton	Democratic	14,306	26.4%
2020	Ohio House of Representatives	General	54,802	74.7%	Erin Rosiello	Democratic	18,596	25.3%
2022	Ohio House of Representatives	General	39,170	74.8%	Paul Zorn	Democratic	13,167	25.2%

Political offices
Preceded by Ron Maag	Ohio House of Representatives, 55th District; 2017–2024	Succeeded by Michelle Teska
