= Gaza war protests at Ohio State University =

- Part of Gaza war protests (in the US • at universities (in 2024 (in the US)))
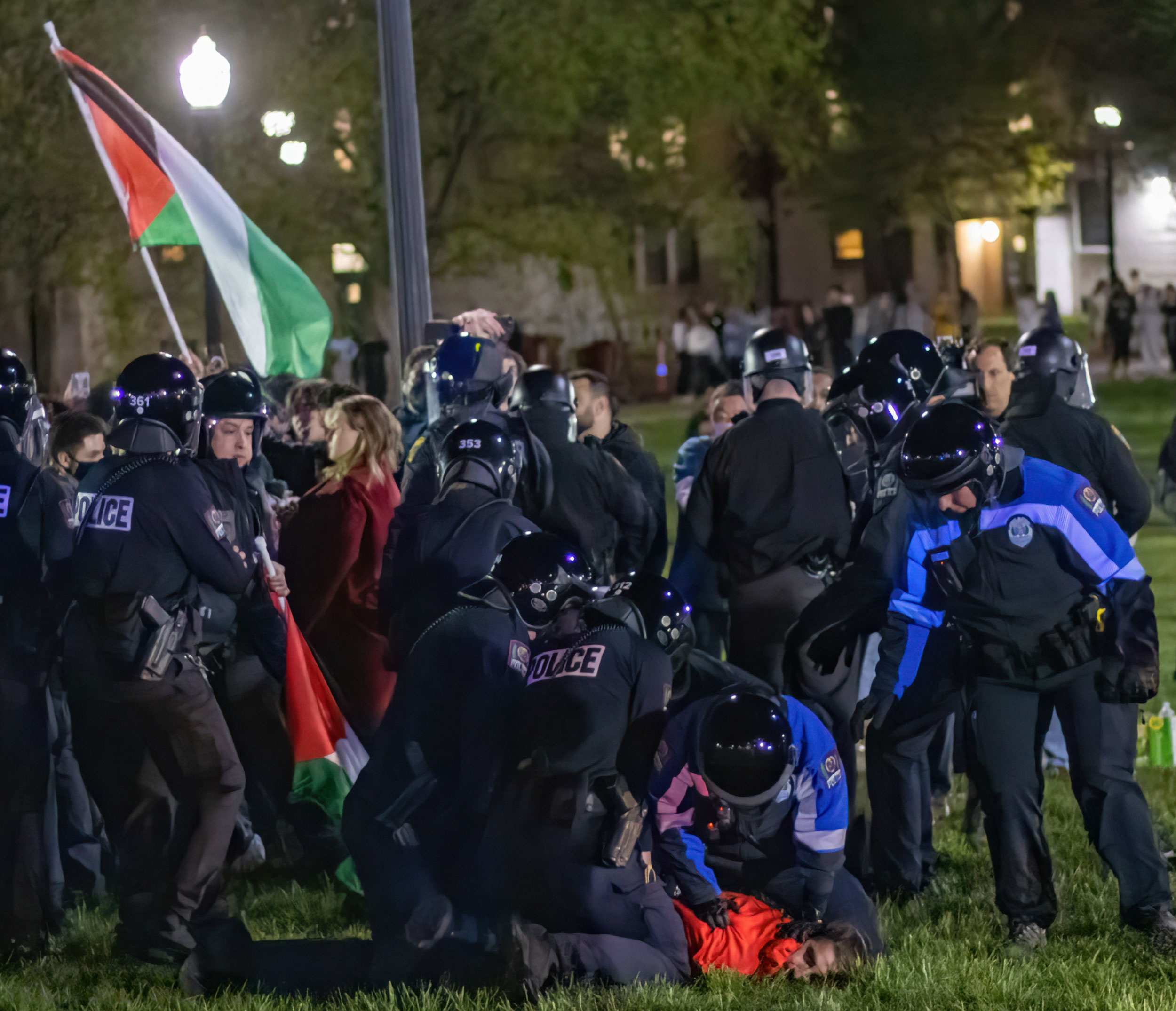
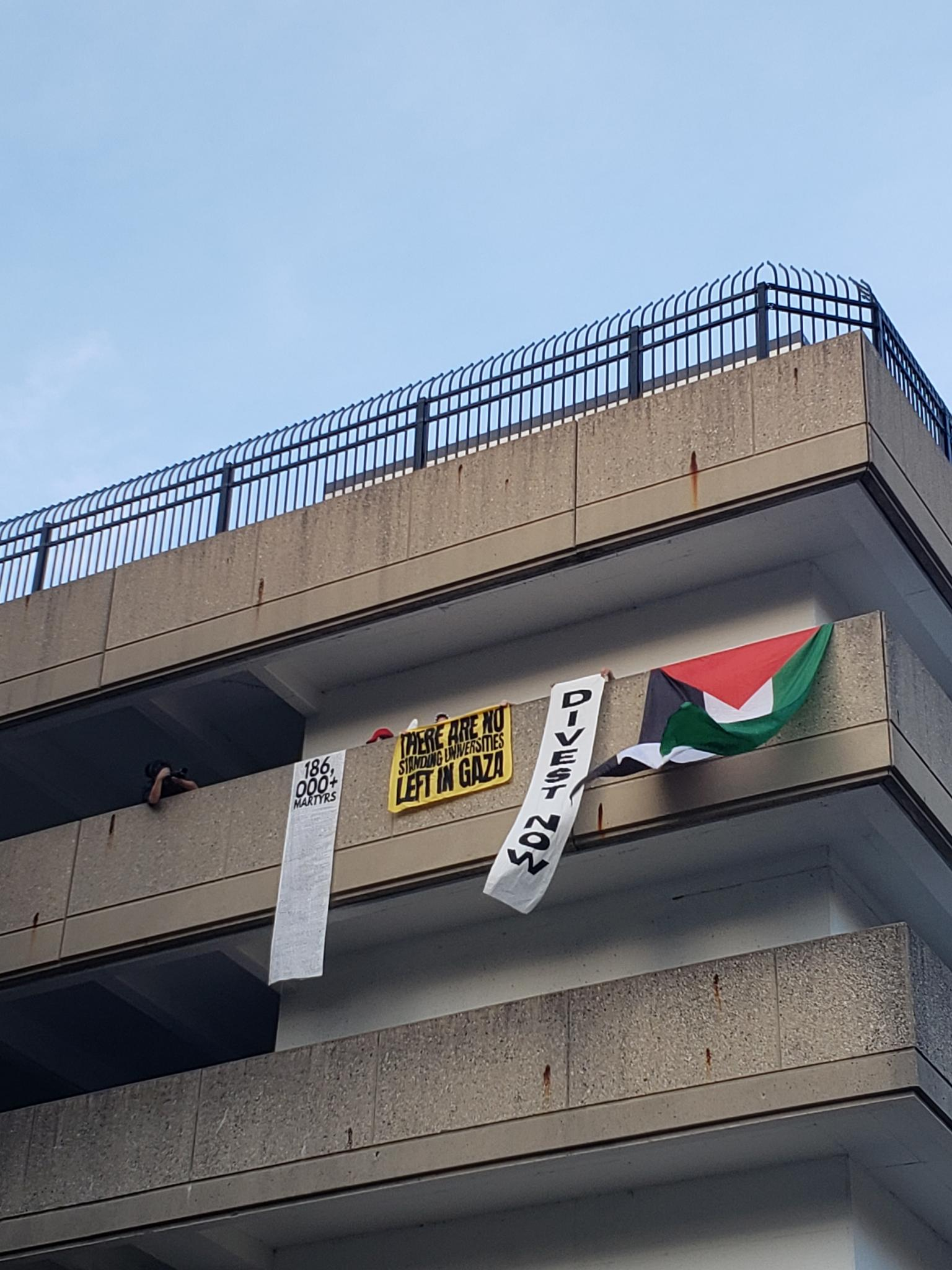
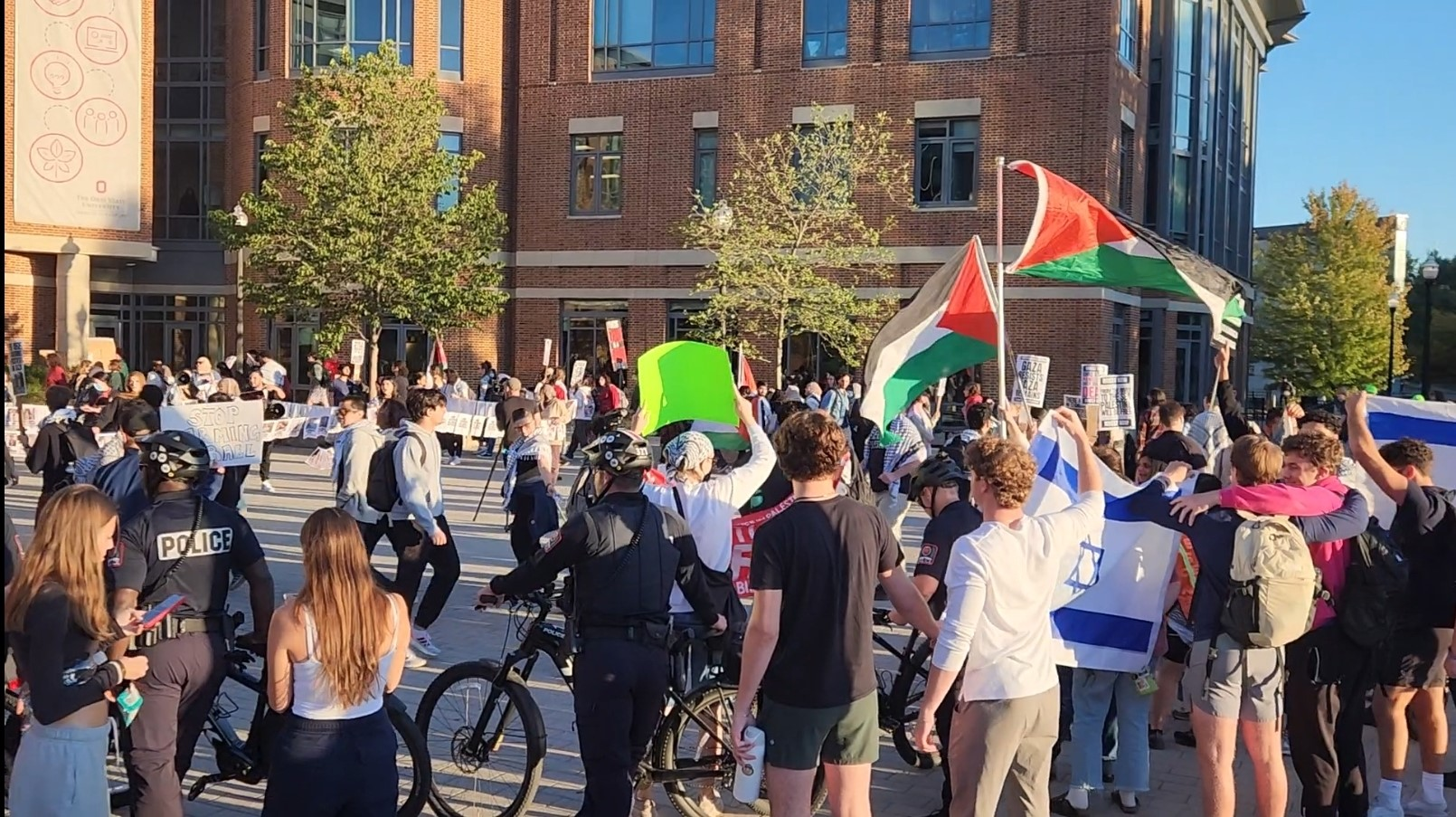
- Clockwise from top: Officers arresting pro-Palestinian protester at the Gaza Solidarity Encampment; Banner drop at Arps Garage, September 12, 2024; Photo of protesters outside the Ohio Union, October 7, 2024; Video at same protest
- Date: October 7, 2023 – Present
- Location: Ohio State University, Columbus, Ohio, United States; 40.002°N 83.015°W
- Methods: Demonstrations; Student activism; Internet activism; Sit-in; Picketing; Lock-on; Civil disobedience; Counter-protests; Banner drop

Parties
Ohio Free Palestine Coalition: Students for Justice in Palestine; Justice, Unity, & Social Transformation; Party for Socialism and Liberation; Rising Tide Columbus; Jews for Justice in Palestine; Central Ohio Revolutionary Socialists; Ohio Youth for Climate Justice; Palestine Liberation Movement; Palestine Women's Association; Faculty & Staff for Justice in Palestine	University authorities: OSU administration; OSU Office of Student Life; OSU Department of Public Safety; OSU Police Department (OSUPD); Law enforcement: Columbus Division of Police (CPD); Franklin County Sheriff's Office; Ohio State Highway Patrol; Pro-Israel groups: Hillel International; Chabad

Lead figures
	Ted Carter; Mike DeWine

Casualties and losses
38-46 arrests; 1 court summons issued; 1 student expelled	None
- 12 OSU student visas were revoked under Trump, at least one of which was associated with pro-Palestinian activism

A series of protests at Ohio State University by pro-Palestinian demonstrators are ongoing and began on-campus following the outbreak of the Gaza war and genocide. A solidarity encampment was constructed on OSU's South Oval on April 25, 2024 in solidarity with the Columbia University encampment. Riot police then made 36 arrests against student protesters — the largest mass arrests in campus history since the 1969–1970 Vietnam War protests.

The protester demands of OSU include "financial divestment, academic boycott, financial disclosure, acknowledging the genocide, and ending targeted policing".

Pro-Palestinian groups have been critical of the university's responses to the protests, which have included allowing state troopers to aim sniper rifles at students during the dispersal of the Gaza Solidarity Encampment, suspending a pro-Palestinian student organization, and blocking the Undergraduate Student Government's attempts at passing legislation for financial divestment from Israel after receiving pressure from officials in Zionist organization Hillel International.

Following protests, the OSU administration coordinated multi-agency police operations, implemented a campus-wide chalking ban, and expelled pro-Palestinian social media influencer Guy Christensen; state-level officials floated invoking a 1953 anti-KKK statute against pro-Palestinian protesters who wore face coverings, suggested terminating faculty members who encourage or engage in "violence on campus", and passed the "CAMPUS" Act to formalize free speech restrictions; and officials in the Trump administration revoked the student visa of at least one pro-Palestinian protester at OSU and threatened to withdraw funding from OSU if they did not sufficiently "combat antisemitism" on campus. These actions have been met with multiple lawsuits over alleged violations of First and Fourteenth Amendment rights.

The university has insisted their actions are politically neutral, with OSU President Ted Carter stating the "university's long-standing space rules are content neutral and are enforced uniformly". Critics argue the university engages in selective enforcement of university space rules, enforcing policies disproportionately against pro-Palestinian groups and not similarly against other groups on campus.

== Background ==
=== Early pro-Palestinian activism at OSU ===
Pro-Palestinian activism at Ohio State pre-dated the Gaza-war protests by a decade. In 2013 the university publicly opposed an academic boycott of Israeli higher education, drawing campus attention to the issue. In 2014, students with the Committee for Justice in Palestine erected a “mock Apartheid wall” during Israeli Apartheid Week and distributed faux eviction notices to highlight Palestinian displacement.

In 2015 a divestment push triggered a high-profile student-government fight: after the issue was initially excluded from the regular ballot, OSU's Undergraduate Student Government (USG) called a special election; days later, three USG Judicial Panel justices resigned amid impeachment threats due to "concerns of an 'abuse of power and position'". A later release by OSU Students for Justice in Palestine (SJP) published screenshots obtained (via an FOIA request) of 2015 emails between then–Senior Vice President for Student Life Javaune Adams-Gaston and OSU Hillel director Joseph Kohane regarding changing USG policy to stifle divestment efforts. In 2016, the #ReclaimOSU sit-in at Bricker Hall demanded transparency and listed divestment among its priorities, with administrators warning of potential discipline. A university-wide divestment referendum narrowly failed in 2017, the same year Ohio’s anti-BDS contracting law (H.B. 476) took effect, restricting state entities—including public universities—from contracting with companies that boycott Israel.

Organizing broadened in 2021 with two Columbus rallies of roughly 500 participants each, involving OSU students and allied groups. In 2022, USG passed an emergency resolution urging divestment from Caterpillar and Hewlett Packard, but the outgoing USG president declined to sign it. That year also saw statewide policy shifts, with Governor DeWine signing Executive Order 2022-06D adopting the IHRA definition of antisemitism (which considers some criticisms of Israel to be antisemitism) for state agencies and public colleges, and amendments to Ohio Rev. Code § 9.76 (passed in 2016) explicitly applying anti-boycott contracting rules to higher education.

=== Global outbreak of Gaza war protests ===
By May 6, 2024, student protests had occurred in 45 of the 50 states in the United States and the District of Columbia, with encampments, occupations, walkouts or sit-ins on almost 140 campuses. Thirty-four encampments were established in the United Kingdom; across universities in Australia, beginning with the University of Sydney; and in Canada, including an encampment at McGill University. On May 7, protests spread further on European campuses after mass arrests at the University of Amsterdam campus occupation, including occupation of campus buildings at Leipzig University in Germany, Sciences Po in France, and Ghent University in Belgium. By May 8, protests had taken place in more than 25 countries, and on May 13, approximately 1,000 Dutch students and university staff took part in a national walk-out.

== Protest timeline ==
Since October 7, 2023, protesters have been arrested at the following pro-Palestinian events:

Date	Incident	Confirmed arrests	Alleged arrests by pro-Palestinian groups
April 23, 2024	Meiling Hall disruption	2	2
April 25, 2024	Gaza Solidarity Encampment	36	41
June 1, 2024	Ohio Union disruption	0	3
Present	Total	38	46

=== November 23, 2023: Interim President Peter Mohler door blocking protest ===
On November 23, 2023, over 100 protesters organized by the Palestine Liberation Movement and the Party for Socialism and Liberation over divestment from the Gaza war blocked the entrance to the building of Interim President Peter Mohler's office building, successfully preventing people from entering or leaving the building throughout the duration of the protest. According to WOSU, "OSU employees stood in windows looking down on the protests and took photos with their phones of what was going on below". Protesters left the scene shortly after OSUPD and Columbus Division of Police officers arrived and threatened them with arrest.

=== April 23, 2024: Meiling Hall disruption ===
On April 22, 2024, President Carter made a public announcement saying he will not compromise on "quickly enforcing the law and university policy" when speech "becomes threatening".

On April 23, 2024, in an event organized by Ohio Youth for Climate Justice, around 60 individuals gathered outside Meiling Hall, an administrative building near the Wexner Medical Center, during an OSU Board of Trustees meeting inside the building. They protested, advocating divestment from Israel and fossil fuel divestment.

According to the President of Ohio Youth for Climate Justice, students were warned that there would be "no tolerance for amplified noise" because it was Reading Day. In order to comply, the students chanted without using megaphones after marching to Meiling Hall. OSU police officers told the protesters that even though they did not bring their megaphones, they could be heard from inside the building's lobby. After protesters refused to leave, police arrested two protesters who were OSU students, charging them with criminal trespass and misdemeanor.

=== April 25, 2024: Gaza Solidarity Encampment ===
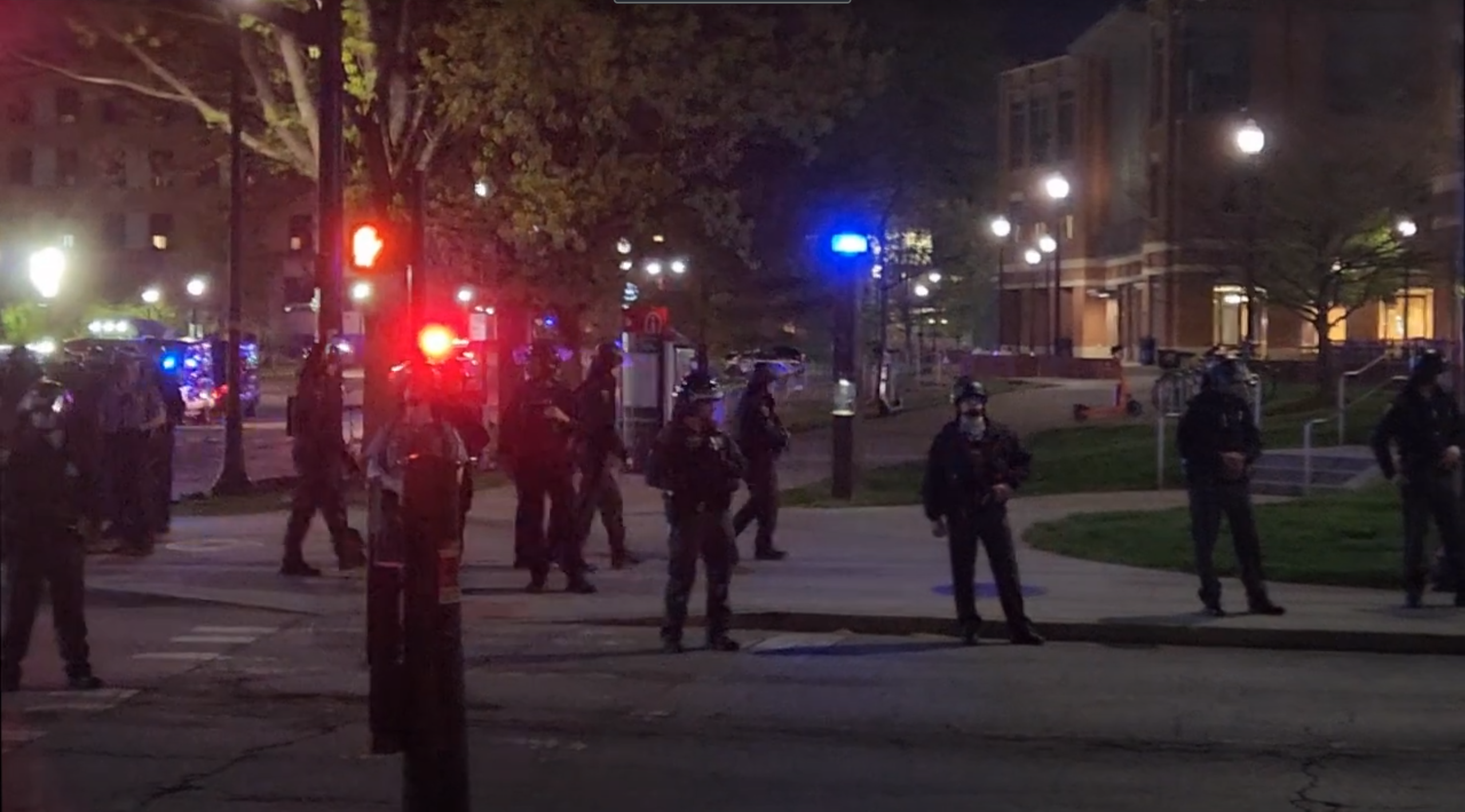
Clockwise from top left:
- Officers move into the South Oval to arrest protesters defending praying Muslim students and chanting "let them pray"
- Officers pick up and arrest protester after dispersing the encampment
- Officers outside the Ohio Union after dispersing the encampment
- Organizers instruct onlookers to go home after encampment was dispersed

An encampment was organized for April 25, 2024 by multiple pro-Palestinian student organizations including OSU and Toledo Students for Justice in Palestine, OSU Jews for Justice in Palestine, the Party for Socialism and Liberation in Columbus, Justice, Unity, & Social Transformation, Palestine Women's Association, Palestine Liberation Movement, Rising Tide Columbus, and Ohio Youth for Climate Justice.

Protesters initially arrived in the morning. Several were arrested throughout the day for pitching tents on the South Oval as police observed from a distance. OSU's Department of Public Safety officers making arrests were unable to provide the exact reason for asking them to leave the premises. OSU research scientist Dr. Sumaya Hamadmad—unaffiliated with the protests—was arrested by police for sitting on the South Oval after police had broken up a previous encampment and was not given a Miranda warning, even after asking to be read her rights. Several others were reportedly harassed for "reading and sitting in the oval". A Jewish OSU student recording from nearby as an observer was approached by police, who told her: "We don't want to arrest you guys... but our instructions were to arrest everyone in the area. We would advise you guys leave".

During the night of the encampment, President Carter requested the state patrol's assistance, although university police had already been coordinating with state police since around 5:00 p.m. Office of Student Life officials cited university space rules "prohibiting camping, overnight events, and disruption to university business", which was later satirized in a political cartoon.

At 7:32 p.m., authorities issued a warning: "disperse within 15 minutes or face arrest". According to The Lantern, "although warnings came from beyond the crowd, laughter, and smiles abounded within". At around 10 p.m., while Muslim students were performing one of their five daily prayers, state patrol officers dressed in riot gear marched on the encampment and began arrests. In response, protesters formed a human barrier around the tents and praying students by connecting their arms together.

During the arrests, state patrol officers on the Ohio Union switched from observing students through spotting scopes to aiming "long-range firearms" at students. University spokesperson Benjamin Johnson originally claimed there were no armed officers on the Ohio Union rooftop, but after photographs of the snipers were later released, he stated that "the team carries standard equipment, including firearms, that would only be used reactively to protect the safety of all present, including demonstrators". Ohio State University was one of the only two universities in the world, the other being Indiana University, with reports of police snipers being present at the 2024 pro-Palestinian campus protests.

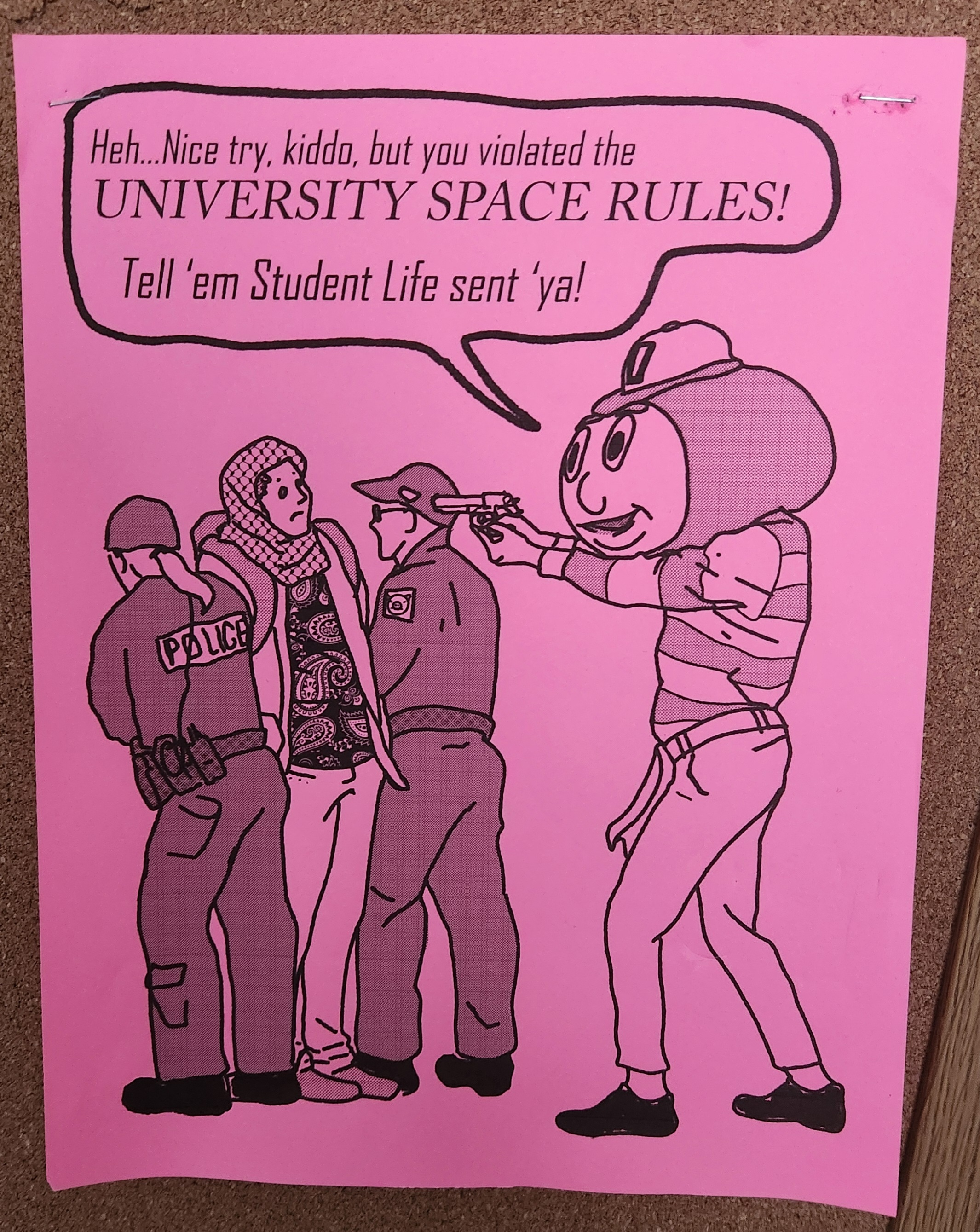
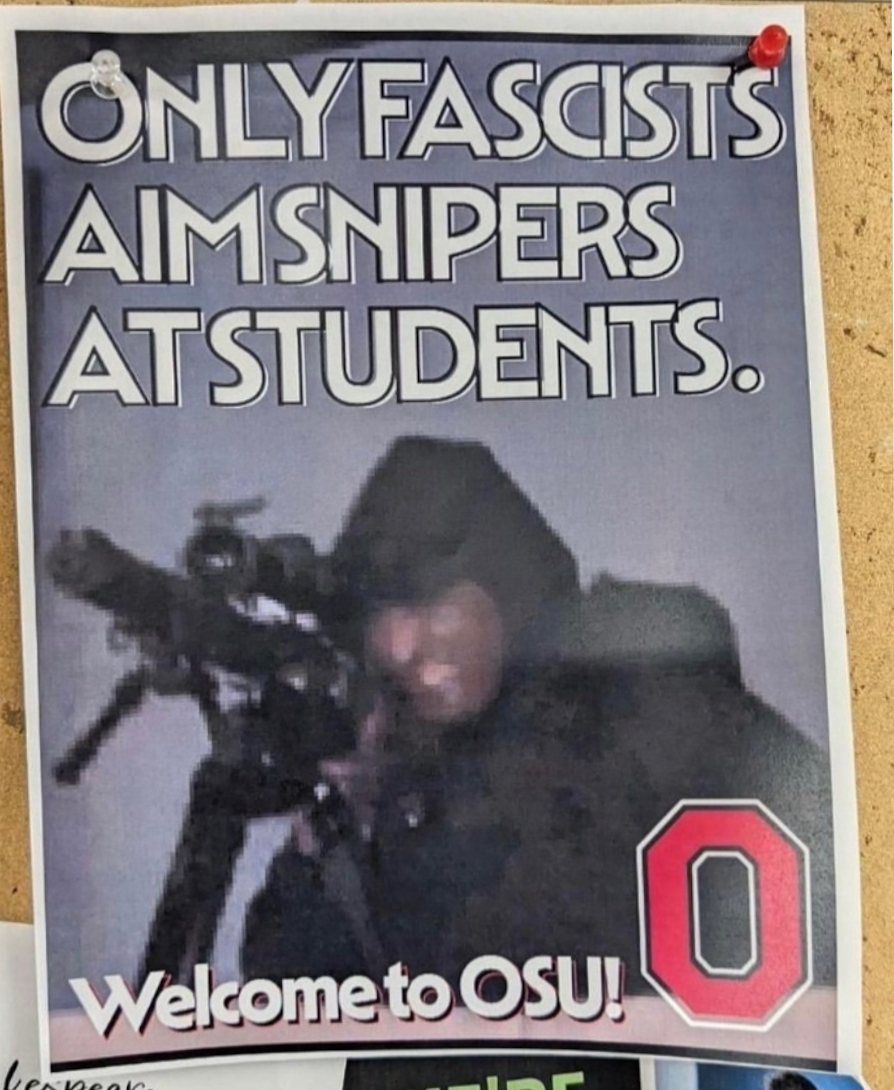
- Political cartoon depicting OSU mascot Brutus Buckeye aiming a gun at a student wearing a hijab citing university space rules
- Poster critical of OSU administration depicting photograph of a sniper from the Gaza Solidarity Encampment

By the end of the evening, at least 36 protesters, including 16 Ohio State students and 20 non-Ohio State students, had been arrested according to authorities. This number is disputed by Ohio's Council on American–Islamic Relations (CAIR-Ohio), who reported 41 were arrested throughout the day. CAIR-Ohio also alleged that police had ripped hijabs off Muslim protesters while making arrests. One woman who was struck in the face showed "her bruise to others watching as she walked away from the chaos". Those arrested were charged with criminal trespass. A statement OSU later released read: "Arrests are not an action that we take lightly, and we appreciate the support of all of our law enforcement partners to disperse the encampment for the safety of our university community".

Students for Justice in Palestine claim there were "at least 70 officers" on the scene. After being arrested, they also alleged that hijabs were forcefully removed from students during mugshots, that Muslims were refused a space to pray, and that police refused to provide them with Halal food.

=== April 29, 2024: Columbus City Council testimonies ===
A pro-Palestinian OSU student speaker, who was arrested at the Gaza Solidarity Encampment, in an altercation with Columbus City Council President Shannon G. Hardin

On April 29, 2024, pro-Palestinian demonstrators arrived at a Columbus City Council meeting to support demonstrators who were arrested at the Gaza Solidarity Encampment, demanding the city drop all charges against them for criminal trespassing. The demonstrators filled the gallery and yelled slogans such as "shame" at courthouse representatives during the speeches of three OSU students who been arrested at the Gaza Solidarity Encampment.

One speaker accused police of giving her a severe concussion which resulted in an ER visit, and a second speaker accused police of pulling down his pants after they zip tied him. He also claimed that after another protester passed out and hit his head against a wall, police ignored their requests for medical assistance for 15 minutes before seeking paramedics.

=== March 4, 2025: Shred SB1 rally ===
Ohio Senate Bill 1 (SB 1), enacted in June 2025, sparked significant backlash leading up to being passed. SB 1's restrictions on DEI programs and classroom discussion of "controversial beliefs"—explicitly including foreign policy and immigration—were cited as escalating risks for pro-Palestinian speech and teaching.

On March 4, 2025, a 1-4 p.m. rally branded "Shred SB1" gathered at the William Thompson statue on the Oval, organized by AAUP–Ohio State and the Ohio Student Association. This rally was organized following OSU's announcement of the closure of two DEI-focused offices and the elimination of 16 professional staff positions—moves critics linked to a broader climate around S.B. 1 and to contemporaneous federal directives in the same week. On the same day as the rally, a social-media post by President Trump threatened to cut federal funding for institutions that "allow illegal protests" and to have protesters expelled, arrested, or deported.

Reporting described "hundreds" of participants and more than a dozen speakers in a statewide day of action; speakers included OSU faculty from over 20 disciplines, Ohio House Representative Munira Abdullahi (D), union representatives (Ohio Federation of Teachers, Wex Workers United, IATSE Local 12), and student organizations such as the National Society of Black Engineers, Students for Justice in Palestine, and Jews for Justice in Palestine, with chants like "S.B. 1 is a war on people". University officials said they supported participants' freedom of expression during the protest.

For bill details, see June 27, 2025: Senate Bill 1 enacted.

=== March 5, 2025: Protest against former Israeli Prime Minister Naftali Bennett campus visit ===
- Columbus Police Department bike police form barrier outside OSU Hillel Wexner Jewish Student Center during protest against former Israeli Prime Minister Naftali Bennett's visit
- Officers instruct the crowd to "move back" during the protest against Bennett's visit

On March 5, 2025, former Israeli Prime Minister Naftali Bennett, who is running for reelection against Benjamin Netanyahu, visited the Hillel Wexner Jewish Student Center adjacent to OSU campus.

Bennett has historically made controversial statements about Palestinians and Arabs which have earned condemnation, saying: "I already killed lots of Arabs in my life, and there is absolutely no problem with that". When asked in 2017 about Palestinian statehood, he replied: "A Palestinian state would be a disaster for the next 200 years". When asked about Palestinians on life support and babies in incubators at risk due to Israel's power embargo on Gaza, he responded: "Are you seriously keep on [sic] asking me about Palestinian civilians? What's wrong with you?"

Over 280 people gathered to listen during Bennett's visit. Outside, a group of around 100 students and community members gathered and began chanting slogans such as "free Palestine", "we want justice, you say how, get him off our campus now", and "Bennett Bennett, you're to blame, ethnic cleansing is your name". One protester stated: "In this building, they're harboring a war criminal. This is not our first time here".

The protests lasted for hours, continuing after Bennett's speech ended at 8 p.m.. According to the Columbus Free Press, "One officer, visibly frustrated, was overheard saying, 'Why don't they just make a decision already instead of making us wait?'... After an hour and a half of delays, three men in black hoodies suddenly rushed into the waiting vehicles at all exit points, which sped off simultaneously, including the unmarked blue sedan, which now had police lights".

After the event, OSU spokesperson Benjamin Johnson stated "The safety of students, faculty and staff is our top priority. Ohio State's public safety and student life teams were in contact with Hillel before the event to consult on safety planning and offer other assistance as part of our normal support processes. Ohio State also coordinated with Columbus Police so that both university and city police were prepared to offer support".

=== April 25, 2025: Student visa revocations lawsuit press conference ===
In the wake of a nationwide wave of student-visa revocations under the Trump administration—which included the termination of 12 Ohio State University students’ visas—OSU graduate student Ahwar Sultan (an Indian citizen), who had been arrested in 2024 in connection with the Gaza Solidarity Encampment, filed a lawsuit challenging the federal revocation of his immigration status.

On April 25, 2025, Students for Justice in Palestine and allied campus organizations held a press conference outside Thompson Library in support of Sultan, with SJP co-president Jineen Musa among the organizers. According to OSUPD and university spokesperson Chris Booker, attendees were asked to comply with campus standards restricting amplified sound before 5:30 p.m. on weekdays but did not stop after being asked.

After the event ended, Sultan and Musa were detained by police. Sultan was warned about, but did not receive, court summons. Musa was issued summons for criminal trespass, despite attempts by university faculty to talk down OSU police.

For the visa actions under Trump and subsequent lawsuit, see 2025: Student visa revocations and litigation.

== Legal and policy actions ==
There have been a wide range of legal, administrative, and policy changes from university, municipal, state, and federal authorities, largely in response to the student-led protests. There have also been legal actions by pro-Palestinian groups over alleged violations of constitutional rights.

=== University actions ===
==== December 13, 2023: Central Ohio Revolutionary Socialists suspension ====
On December 13, 2023, the Central Ohio Revolutionary Socialists (CORS), a registered pro-Palestinian OSU student organization, was suspended from OSU, during which "the club [was] prohibited from participating in or holding activities".

According to university spokesperson Dave Isaacs, this was due to several violations, including "disregarding university directives, being non-responsive to meeting requests from the organization's advisors and university leaders, and dissemination of materials that include a logo associated with a designated terrorist organization"—the PFLP. The PFLP is designated as a terrorist organization by many countries (including the United States), but not by others (including United Kingdom). Their poster, titled "Intifada, Revolution, and the Path to a Free Palestine", included a drawing of an armed pro-Palestinian militant, which caused the university to claim CORS posed a "significant risk of substantial harm".

In a public statement, CORS called the statements made by The Lantern defamatory, demanding that the OSU administration retract and apologize for their article. CORS claimed that OSU dropped the allegation they pose a "significant risk of substantial harm" after they "quickly and easily dispelled the absurd notion that we are a front for or otherwise materially supporting the [PFLP]". CORS also claimed OSU misrepresented the charges in order to suspend them due to their political beliefs, including using ignoring a generic "getting to know you" email sent during finals week as a pretense for claiming they ignored communications from the university, by not making clear that an OSU room reservation they made had expired, and by selectively enforcing OSU signage policy.

On February 2, 2024, CORS was reinstated as a student organization under the condition they attend extra meetings with administration, which CORS claims was largely due to "the hundreds of individuals and organizations who supported us".

==== March 25, 2024: Undergraduate Student Government divestment scandal ====
On March 25, 2024, OSU's Undergraduate Student Government (USG) proposed an initiative titled "Urging OSU to Divest from Companies Profiting from Human Rights Violations". The initiative received 1247 signatures (with 415 digital signatures from a digital circulator and 832 signatures from other sources), above the 1,000-signature minimum needed to appear on the presidency ballot. USG's Judicial Panel nullified this initiative.

According to OSU Students for Justice in Palestine (SJP) co-president Jineen Musa, the signatures were "deemed invalid due to the dissemination of the petition on Instagram". Musa claimed other candidates who had "used the exact same method to a greater extent than what we did" were not penalized, implying their initiative was targeted due to its pro-Palestinian content.

SJP published screenshots obtained (via a Freedom of Information Act request) of emails from 2015 between then Senior Vice President for Student Life Javaune Adams-Gaston and Hillel International member Joseph Kohane. In the email, Kohane implores USG's Judicial Panel to veto a past USG divestment initiative by changing ballot signature policies, saying, "we urge that USG and especially the Judicial Panel hold itself accountable and make the needed changes, including reversing the signature threshold". SJP argued the reason why OSU deemed their signatures invalid in 2024 was in part due to continued influence from Hillel against the OSU administration, as evidenced by Hillel's interference with 2015 divestment ballot initiatives also targeting signature threshold policies.

==== May 30, 2025: Expulsion of pro-Palestinian student influencer ====
In May 2025, social media influencer and OSU student Guy Christensen posted a video about the 2025 Capital Jewish Museum shooting, condemning the shooting as "slaughter of civilians". Later in the day, Christensen posted another video retracting his condemnation, saying, "I take it back. I do not condemn the elimination of those two Zionist officials who worked at the Israeli Embassy last night and here's why." Christensen said the shooting was not an act of terrorism or antisemitism, but an act of resistance against genocide that "Israel has livestreamed to the entire world for the last two years". In the same day, Christensen denounced pro-Israel House Representative Ritchie Torres for "associating with the pro-Israel lobbying group the American Israel Public Affairs Committee (AIPAC), supporting Zionism, and denying that Israel's actions in Gaza constitute 'genocide'".

Trump administration officials in the United States Attorney General office, Torres, and House Representative Brian Mast called for Christensen to be investigated, accusing him of antisemitism. On May 27, an Instagram account called "endjewhatred" doxxed Christensen as a student at OSU, urging followers to send a letter to President Carter en masse. Christensen was notified there would be a hearing on June 5, but shortly after, on May 30, Christensen was expelled from OSU and his hearing was canceled.

On September 17, the American Civil Liberties Union of Ohio (ACLU) announced a lawsuit against Ohio State University administrators, including President Carter, Senior Vice President for Student Life Melissa Shivers, and University Registrar employee Ryan Hunt, for expelling Christensen. They allege his First Amendment rights were violated because he was participating in free speech as a public university student without supporting violence, and they allege his Fourteenth Amendment rights were violated because he was not given due process before his expulsion.

==== August 14, 2025: University chalking ban ====
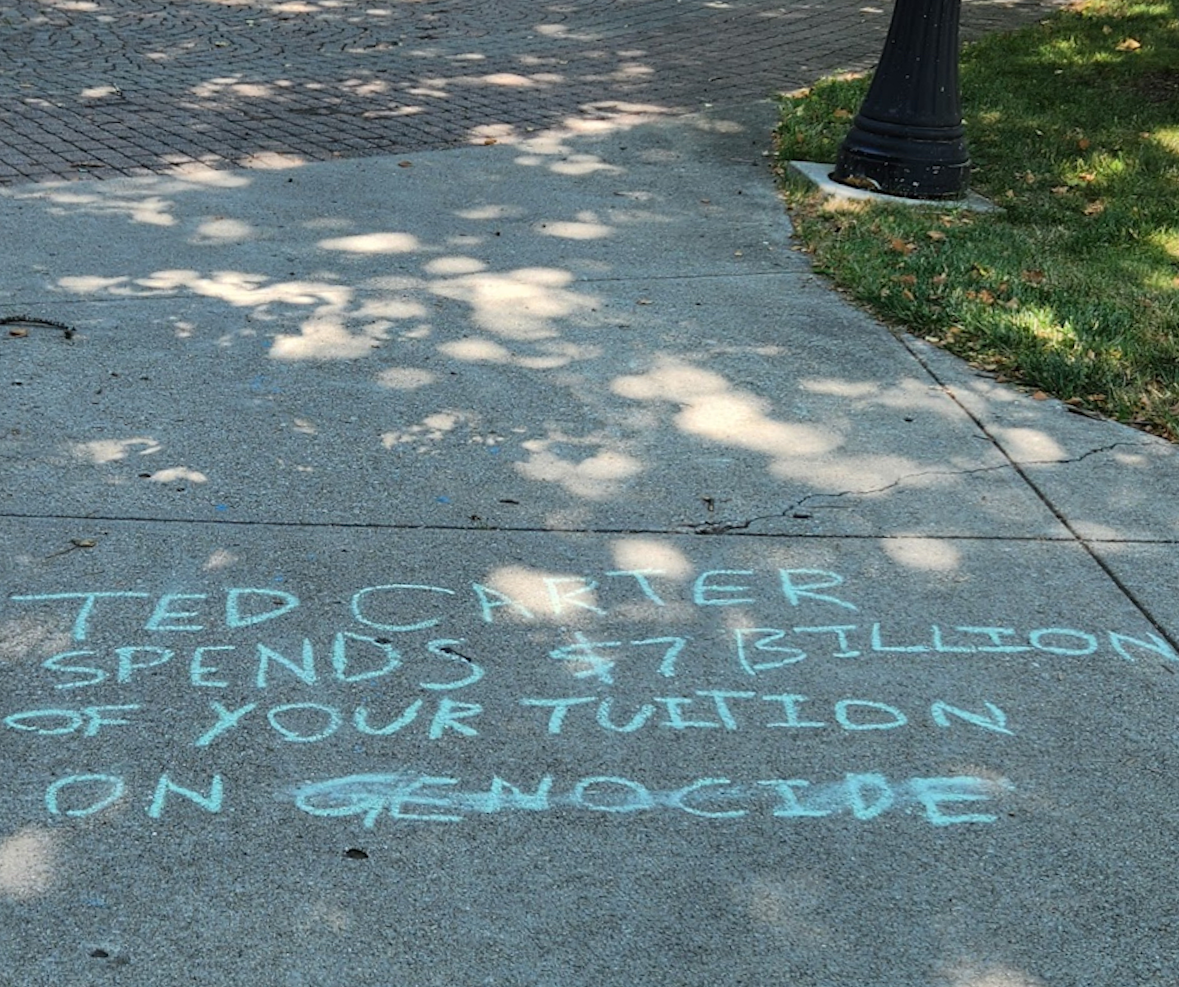
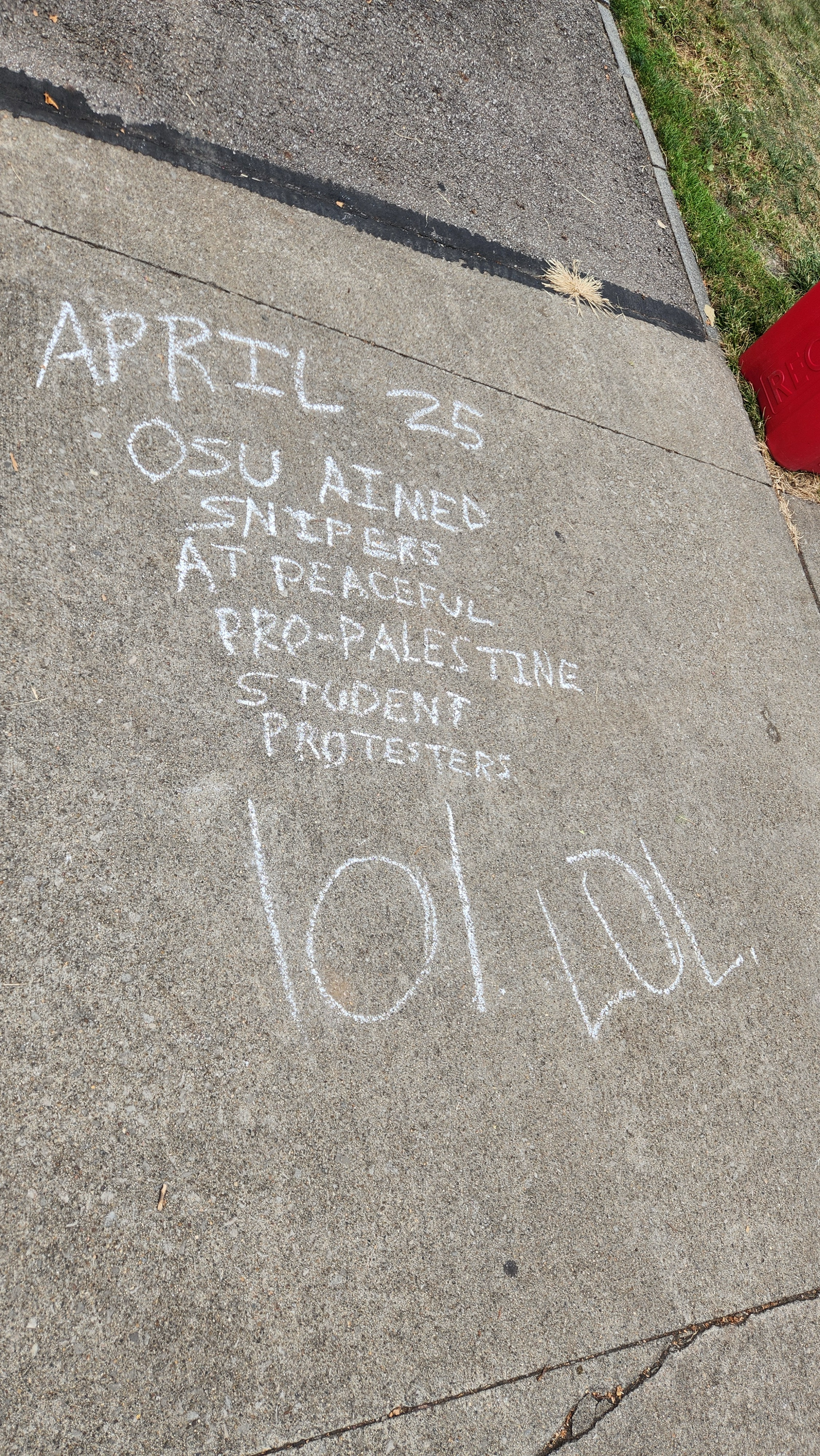
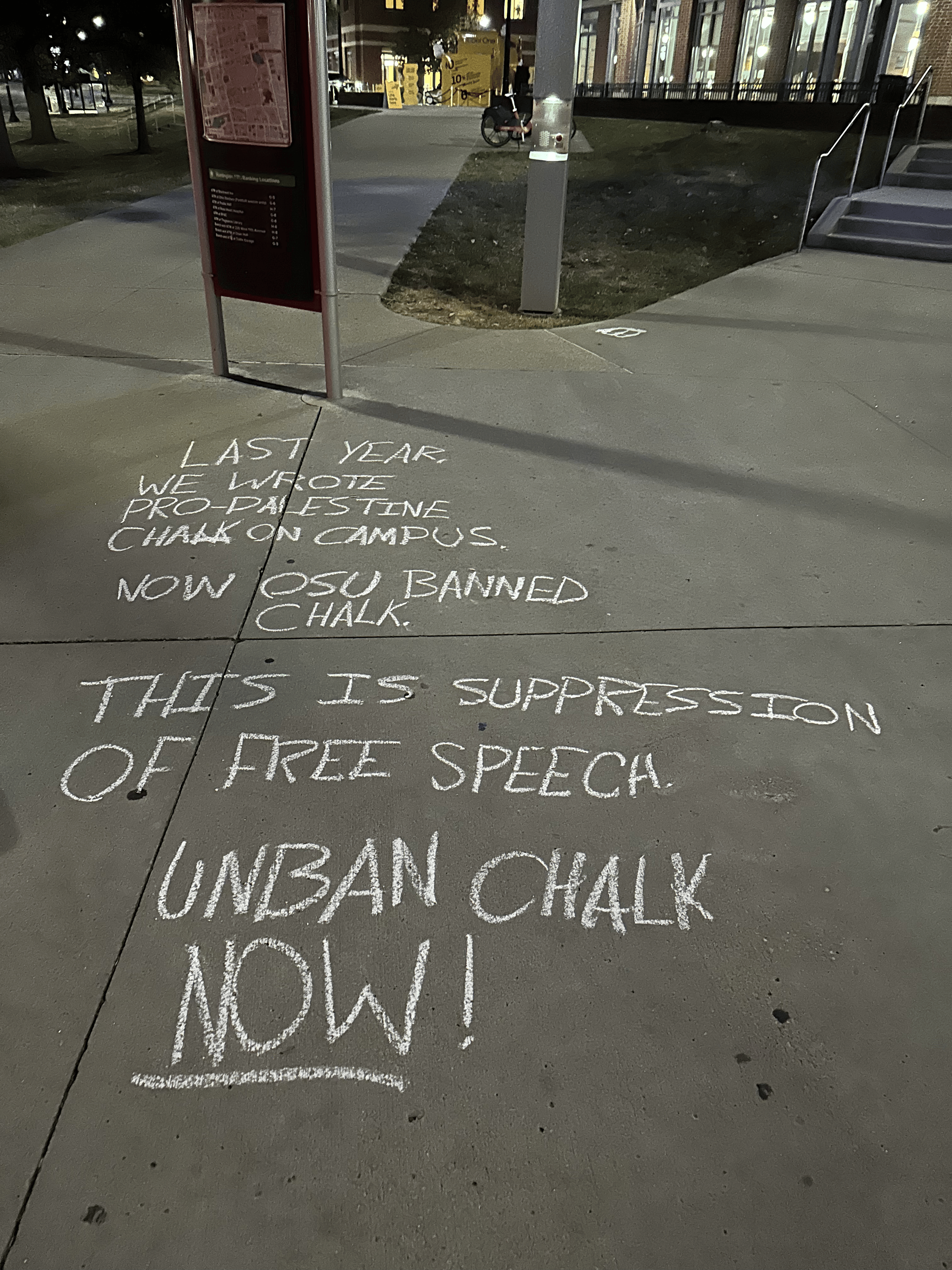
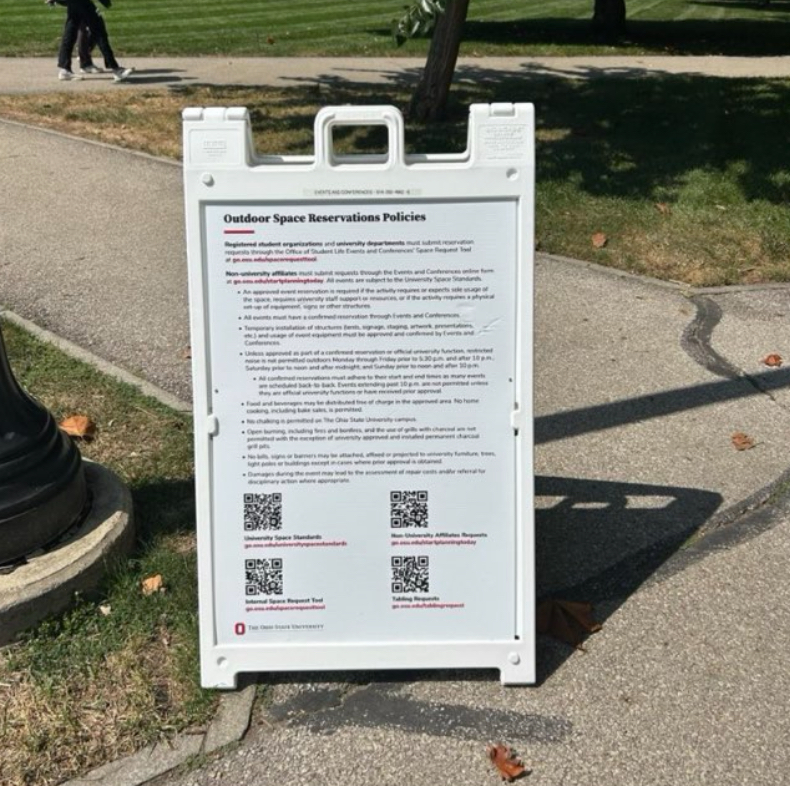
Top row then bottom row:
- Prior to the ban: Chalk on campus criticizing the OSU administration, one with mocking messages written by others below
- Following the ban: Chalk on campus criticizing the OSU administration, staff spraying pro-Palestine chalk message with hose, and sign stating "no chalking is permitted on campus"

Pro-Palestinian chalking, as well as chalking critical of the OSU administration, frequently occurred on OSU campus during the Fall 2024 and Spring 2025 semesters. According to president of OSU Chabad Gabby Sloane, "when it's a lot warmer, there's a lot of chalking that goes around on campus, and a lot of messages are directed at certain school administration, or the messages invoke violence against Jewish students". One chalk message Sloane showed The Lantern read "I love Hamas", but no other messages directly invoking violence against Jewish students have been reported or confirmed. Other chalk messages read "Free Palestine", "End Zionism", and "Israel Commits Genocide". OSU Faculty Staff for Justice in Palestine member Dr. Pranav Jani corroborated the claim that there is often pro-Palestinian chalk on campus sidewalks, but did not see violent or antisemitic chalk, seeing it as "speaking out against genocide... and human rights abuses". Chalking is also "often used by student activists during protests", including pro-Palestinian protests at OSU.

Prior to March 2025, Sloane attempted to create a policy that removes chalk messages on the sidewalk if they are perceived as invoking violence against Jewish students. However, because the messages usually do not target a specific person, OSU administrators told her they can't take action.

On August 14, 2025, one week before the start of the Fall 2025 semester at OSU, and compliant with SB1, OSU invoked Section 3320.08 of the newly passed "CAMPUS" Act to post an announcement to their website called "Chalking Not Permitted on Campus", banning all chalking on campus under Ohio law, including pro-Palestinian chalking. The announcement stated that OSU "reserves the right to charge for the cost of any repairs required due to removal" of chalk, that "students found responsible would be subject to potential conduct referral", and provided an email address for reporting "chalking or other non-compliant signage".

The announcement cited a "comprehensive system of building, pedestrian and vehicular wayfinding signage" as their reason for banning chalk messages on campus. University spokesperson Benjamin Johnson stated "in light of continued complaints regarding chalking on campus and the significant amount of administrative time spent evaluating chalking, we have revised the university signage standards".

The chalking ban is "part of a trend of colleges and universities putting restrictions on expressive activities over the last year in the wake of pro-Palestinian encampments popping up on campuses nationwide" including Harvard University, University of Louisville, and University of Maryland, which all implemented anti-chalking policies the previous year.

Following the announcement, chalking critical of the ban has continued at OSU.

External image
- Ohio American Civil Liberties Union 2026 letter

In 2026, the Ohio American Civil Liberties Union sent a letter to OSU demanding rescission of the chalk ban.

=== Municipal actions ===
==== July 2024: Gaza Solidarity Encampment plea deal for arrestees ====
After the Gaza Solidarity Encampment, Columbus City Attorney Zach Klein offered a plea deal to all protesters arrested on April 25, 2024. The deal offers protesters who plea guilty the reduction of their charges from fourth-degree misdemeanor criminal trespassing charges to minor misdemeanor disorderly conduct charges. Multiple protesters accepted the deal. Klein received controversy for not dropping the charges altogether. In response he stated that "those arrested for a crime should be held accountable in some way".

=== State actions ===
==== May 2024: Ohio Attorney General Dave Yost letter ====
After the Gaza Solidarity Encampment, Ohio Attorney General (R) Dave Yost wrote a letter to the presidents of 14 public, four-year universities in Ohio—including Ohio State University—advising them to "warn" students about an anti-Ku Klux Klan law passed in 1953, which could be used to prosecute students who commit misdemeanors while wearing face coverings (including COVID-19 masks) with felony charges. Yost said: "In our society, there are few more significant career-wreckers than a felony charge... I write to you today to inform your student bodies of an Ohio law that, in the context of some behavior during the recent pro-Palestinian protests, could have that effect". The section of the law he was referring to states that two or more people who commit misdemeanors while wearing masks or disguises is punishable by fourth-degree felony charges, up to $5,000 in fines, and five years on community control.

Ohio legal expert Rob Barnhart noted he'd "never heard of the state's law being applied previously, even to bank robbers wearing masks". The American Civil Liberties Union denounced Yost, stating "in today's world of constant surveillance, people protesting should have the right to wear a mask".

Yost's letter also urged compliance with Ohio's anti-BDS statute, Ohio Revised Code § 9.76, reminding presidents that state agencies—including public universities—are barred from boycotting Israel or contracting with companies that boycott Israel.

==== July 26, 2024: "CAMPUS" Act enacted ====
The "CAMPUS" Act, also known as House Bill 606 (HB606), was initially introduced by Ohio Representatives (R) Justin Pizzulli and (D) Dontavius Jarrells, was later incorporated into Senate Bill 94 (SB94), and was signed into law on July 26, 2024, with an effective date of October 24, 2024. The policy's stated goal is to "require public and private colleges and universities to adopt and enforce a policy regarding racial, religious, and ethnic harassment and intimidation". The act has garnered attention on social media, with pro-Palestinian group Rising Tide Columbus alleging that it marks the end of free speech protections at OSU and that it was passed to oppress pro-Palestinian protests.

One of the provisions of SB94, outlined in Section 3320.08, enables each state institution of higher education to publicize on its website "any time, place, or manner restrictions it places on expressive activities". According to Ohio Revised Code Section 3345.0211, expressive activities includes "any lawful verbal, written, audiovisual, or electronic means by which individuals may communicate ideas, including all forms of peaceful assembly, protests, speeches, distribution of literature, carrying and displaying signs, and circulating petitions". While the bill says it protects First Amendment rights, the bill does not put any constraints on when restrictions on expressive activities are allowed to be implemented.

The bill also mandates that institutions ensure collaboration between their campus security and local law enforcement, the state highway patrol, and student communities to provide security for student organizations facing threats of terror attacks or hate crimes. Additionally, the act establishes three grant programs to ensure student safety at events: the Campus Security Support Program, the Campus Student Safety Grant Program, and the Campus Community Grant Program.

Funding allocations for these programs included $2,000,000 for the Campus Security Support Program, $1,000,000 for the Campus Student Safety Grant Program, and $1,375,000 for Campus Safety and Training.

==== June 27, 2025: Senate Bill 1 enacted ====
Ohio Senate Bill 1 (S.B. 1), also known as the Advance Ohio Higher Education Act, is a 2025 law in the U.S. state of Ohio that bans diversity, equity, and inclusion (DEI)-based hiring and enrollment in universities as well as banning school faculty from going on strike. It was signed by Governor Mike DeWine on March 28, 2025, and took effect on June 27, 2025.

The bill affects public colleges and universities. Part of its intention is to support "intellectual diversity". Much of the controversy surrounding S.B. 1 involves it potentially targeting the left-wing and being ambiguous with its wording. It was passed along party lines in both chambers, with all Ohio Democrats opposing and five Ohio Republicans; two in the Senate and three in the House. A similar bill, Senate Bill 83, was proposed in 2023 by the same author but was never voted on.

S.B. 1 bans school faculty from going on strike in the state of Ohio. It bans hiring and scholarships based on current diversity, equity, and inclusion (DEI) programs. It also restricts universities from commenting on anything "controversial", more specifically relating to political issues. An American civics course would also be required for students in public universities. Schools that violate the law would have state funding revoked.

For protests at OSU opposing university compliance with bill, see March 4, 2025: "Shred SB1" rally.

==== 2025: Senate Bill 87 introduced ====
In 2025, Ohio State Senator (R) Terry Johnson introduced Senate Bill 87, with cosponsors Jerry Cirino, George Lang, and Tim Schaffer—also Republican Ohio senators—titled "Define antisemitism; expand the offense of ethnic intimidation". The bill "expands the offense of riot and aggravated riot committed by reason of the race, color, religion, or national origin of another person or group of persons". The bill is based on Ohio Senate Bill 297, which failed to be enacted before the 2024 Ohio Senate session concluded. Senator Johnson cited "'a concerning wave of extremist demonstrations' on Ohio college campuses" as a reason for the bill. When five or more people "participate in a course of disorderly conduct", or when five or more people are accused of intimidating a public official or employee into taking an official action, a charge of rioting can be made. Since the bill abides by the IHRA definition of antisemitism (which considers some criticisms of Israel to be antisemitism) codified by Governor DeWine in a 2022 executive order, arrestees at the Gaza Solidarity Encampment would likely have qualified for charges of ethnic intimidation.

=== Federal actions ===
==== 2025: Student visa revocations and litigation ====
Beginning in early 2025, federal authorities under the Trump administration initiated a nationwide wave of international student visa terminations that resulted in thousands of students being unable to start or continue classes, with affected students reporting abrupt notice, canceled travel plans, and uncertainty about appeal or reapplication options. At Ohio State University, 12 students were notified their visas had been terminated as part of this federal action.

Reporting on the federal campaign described students being stranded before classes, facing loss of active enrollment and associated benefits, and receiving limited clarity on the criteria used for revocation decisions. One affected OSU graduate student, Ahwar Sultan (an Indian citizen), whose 2024 arrest was connected to the Gaza Solidarity Encampment, filed suit challenging the federal termination of his immigration status.

For the on-campus press conference and subsequent police response, see the April 25, 2025 press conference.

==== 2025: Federal funding and civil rights enforcement ====
After President Trump withdrew $400 million from Columbia University due to the school's "continued inaction to protect Jewish students from discrimination", the federal government began investigating Ohio State University as well as 59 other universities nationwide for "antisemitism and harassment" on campus under Title VI of the Civil Rights Act, threatening OSU with potential "enforcement action" if they fail to protect Jewish students.

== Allegations and campus climate ==
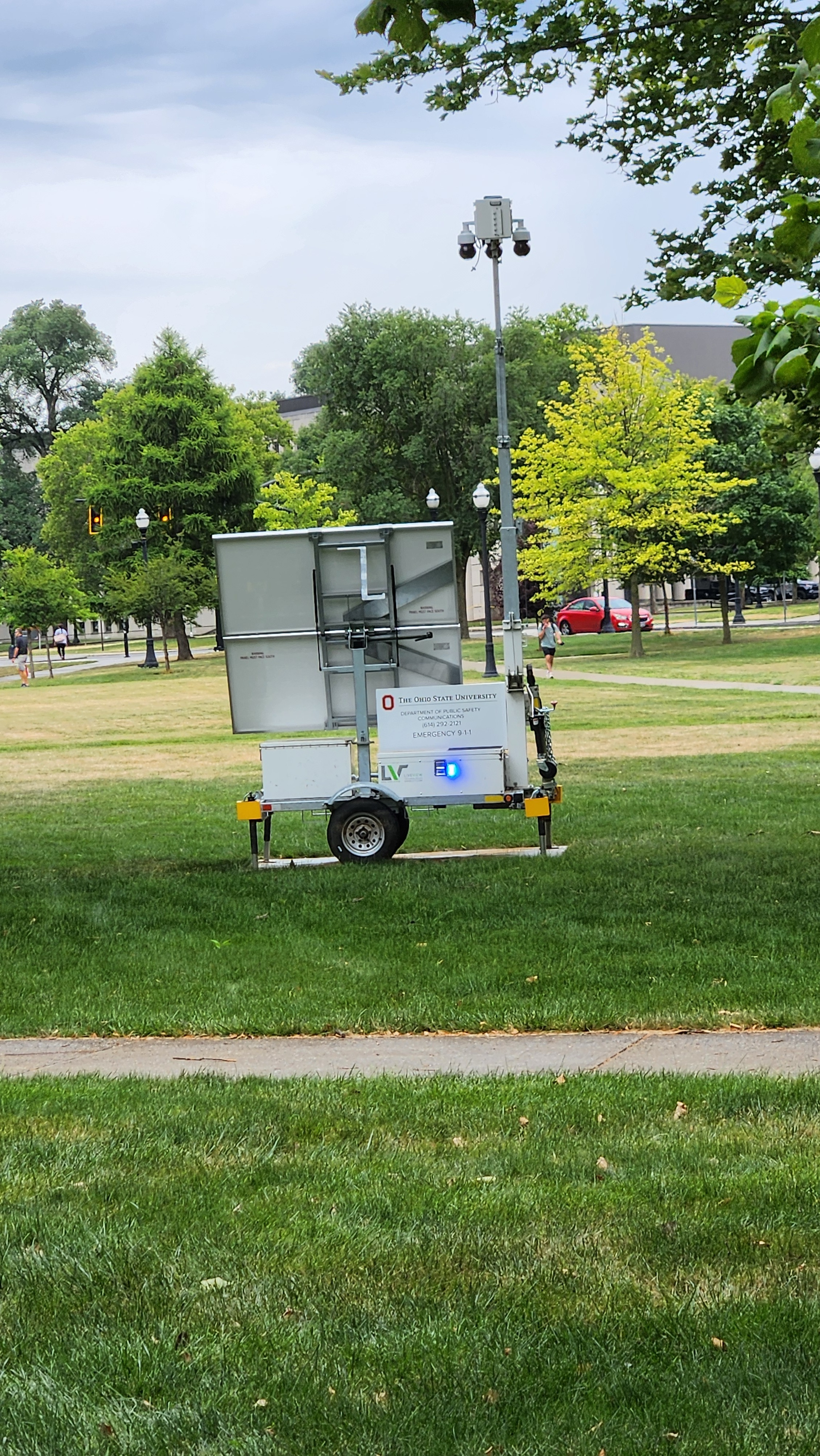
Pro-Palestinian poster in the OSU Timashev Family Music Building criticizing the OSU Board of Trustees, October 14, 2024

=== Allegations of selective enforcement and policy attention asymmetry ===
There have been multiple instances of the OSU administration and government actors being accused of selectively enforcing policies against pro-Palestinian groups. There are also allegations of passing policies targeting antisemitism but not anti-Palestinianism, anti-Arabism, or Islamophobia on campus.

==== Verified enforcement differences ====
- The Lantern noted that after OSU Hillel (a pro-Israel student group) and Students for Justice in Palestine both held vigils in September 2024, a "police surveillance tower" was erected at the location of the SJP vigil but not at the OSU Hillel vigil.
- After President Carter cited university space rules as the reason why the Gaza Solidary Encampment was dispersed, he was asked by The Lantern about why an "on-campus Christian baptism ceremony"—which outstayed its space reservation thereby also violating university space rules—resulted in no arrests, in contrast to the Gaza Solidarity Encampment. Carter stated that the latter protest only ended in arrests due to "a planned attempt and a clear statement to violate campus space rules".
- After Ohio Attorney General (R) Dave Yost wrote a letter to OSU administrators advising them to "warn" students about an anti-Ku Klux Klan law passed in 1953 which could target recently arrested pro-Palestinian student protesters who wore masks at protests. Ohio legal expert Rob Barnhart noted he'd "never heard of the state's law being applied previously, even to bank robbers wearing masks".
- In 2015, emails obtained via the FOIA revealed then-OSU Hillel director Joseph Kohane corresponded with then-Senior Vice President for Student Life Javaune Adams-Gaston and urged USG's Judicial Panel to change ballot-signature rules in response to BDS initiatives—evidence of outside pressure on pro-Palestinian initiatives.

==== Selective enforcement allegations by invested groups ====
- After the USG divestment scandal where pro-Palestinian signatures were nullified because they were taken through online forms, SJP co-president Jineen Musa claimed other candidates who had "used the exact same method to a greater extent than what we did" were not penalized, implying their initiative was targeted due to its pro-Palestinian content.
- Musa claimed that while OSU has not spoken about Palestinians who died during the Gaza war, they have "more than once spoken about the Israeli hostages that were taken, so there is a clear double standard".
- Former OSU Professor of social work Keith Kilty accused President Carter of suppressing pro-Palestinian amplified sound even though, according to Kilty, OSU had set no precedent for this happening during other protests he participated in historically that also used amplified sound.
- CAIR-Ohio accused S.B. 1's ambiguity of allowing universities to "crack down on speech critical of state policies—such as pro-Palestinian advocacy—while allowing other viewpoints to flourish unchecked".
- After S.B. 1 was enacted, OSU art professor and AAUP-Ohio State member Dr. Carmen Winant claimed faculty members at OSU were "afraid to teach their students about Palestinian artists".
- After student organization Central Ohio Revolutionary Socialists was suspended in part due to hanging up posters around campus, they accused OSU of enforcing their signage policy against them—but not against other violators—in order to suspend them over pro-Palestinian advocacy.

==== List of actions accused of policy attention asymmetry ====
- The "CAMPUS" Act;
- Senate Bill 87;
- and the federal government Title VI investigations into 60 universities, including OSU.

=== Allegations of hate speech and intimidation ===
==== Antisemitic incidents ====
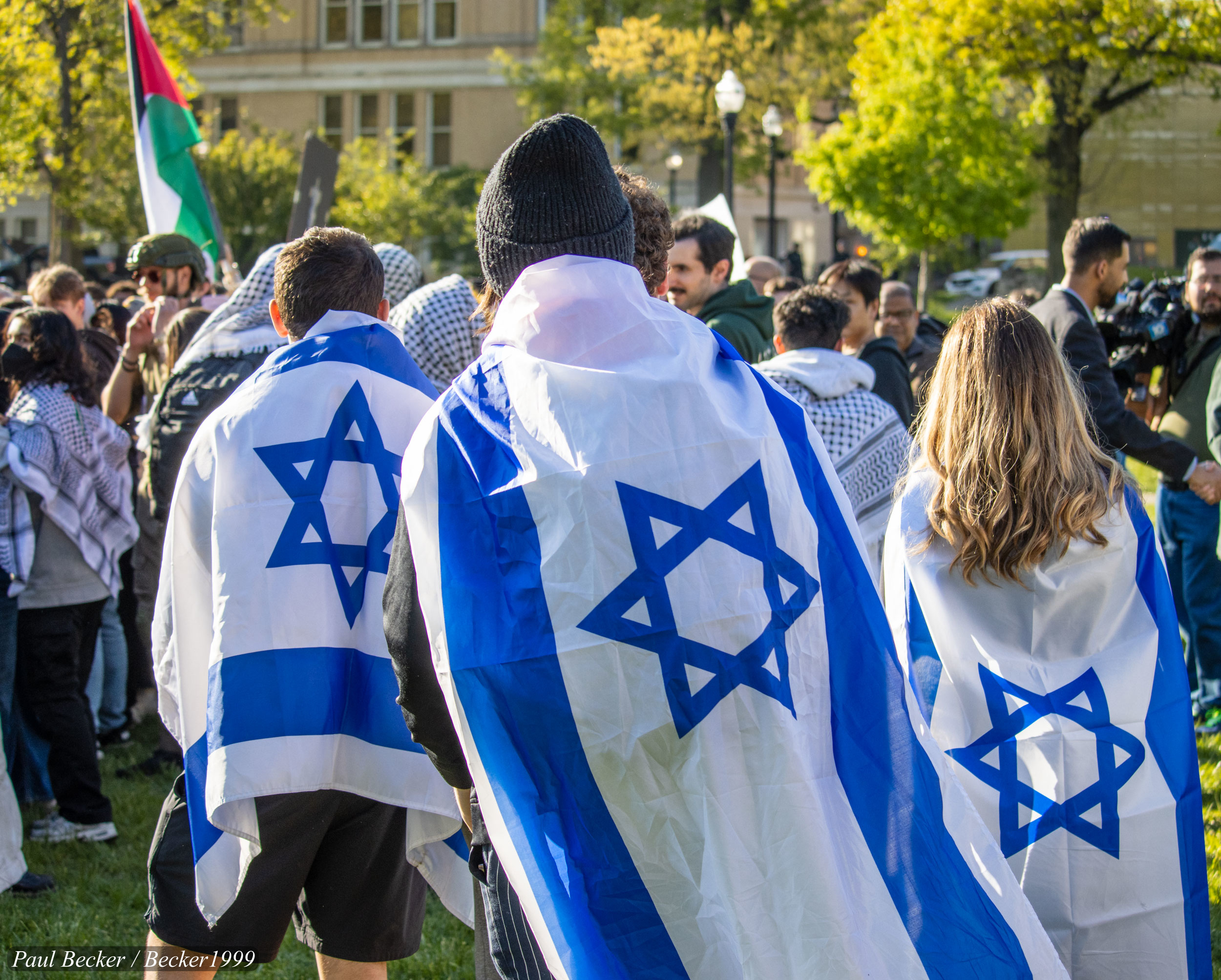
Pro-Israeli supporters at a pro-Palestinian protest on April 25, 2024

On November 10, 2023, there was a violent antisemitic hate crime perpetrated by two males against Jewish students on North High Street next to OSU campus. There is no indication the individuals involved are affiliated with any pro-Palestinian organization. The individuals responsible were originally not identified, but over a year later, one of the individuals, Timur Mamatov, pled guilty to the hate crime with his friend, who has not pled guilty. After seeing an individual wearing a piece of jewelry associated with Judaism, "Mamatov asked the students if they were Jewish, and when they answered that they were, Mamatov punched one victim, fracturing his jaw. A second victim was injured, suffering a fractured nose, as the fight poured over into the street".

On April 20, 2024, Ohio State University administrators claimed "deplorable" comments were made at student protests, describing them as hate speech, but they did not describe what specific comments were made. President Carter has referred to pro-Palestinian demonstrations as consisting of "threats of violence" and "hate speech", again without describing any specific comments.

==== Anti-Palestinian / anti-Arab / Islamophobic incidents ====
Multiple OSU Students for Justice in Palestine (SJP) members have stated that they have been targets of social media death threats, in-class harassment, public profiling and, in one female student's case, a stalking incident. One member received a death threat through Instagram direct messages, saying: "Death to you and your family. I hope the IDF find [sic] you and you die slowly. It's good to know you go to tosu [sic] terrorist, the dean will know your [sic] beheading babies bitch". A second member said she was stalked by a stranger several times after a class and that she filed a formal complaint and reached out to supervisors "at least 10 times" but that no actions were taken, so she stopped going to the class. A third member reported someone using a fake name and address sent a flyer of an Israeli hostage to her private address. A spokesperson for the university claimed the administration and an OSUPD detective reviewed the incidents and offered resources and support, but that none of the students responded.

Canary Mission, a public database dedicated to doxxing pro-Palestinian protesters, has targeted and blacklisted multiple students in OSU SJP and a current OSU professor.

=== List of conflicts between pro-Israel and pro-Palestinian protesters ===
Date	Incident	Details
October 8, 2023	Spitting incident	A student in the OSU Oval purchasing a "I stand with Israel" bracelet was spat on.
November 9, 2023	Hillel flag vandalism	Two protesters with no known connections with the protests vandalized Israeli flags in the OSU Hillel lobby, shouting phrases like "you support genocide". They were charged with misdemeanor, ethnic intimidation, and more. All charges were later dropped except for the trespassing charge.
March 27, 2024	Hillel infosession disruption	Black-bloc pro-Palestinian protesters affiliated with Jews for Justice in Palestine (JJP) and an unnamed allied organization disrupted an infosession for Hillel International's annual "Fact Finder Israel Trip" by holding a sign saying "OSU Hillel invites you to visit a genocidal state". JJP accused Hillel of being an "ethnonationalistic" organization and the event was canceled due to the disruption.
April 20, 2024	Ohio State Student Union protest clash	A counter-protester wearing a kippah confronted pro-Palestinian protesters at a Student Union protest, repeatedly shouting "show your face" at a masked protester and pushing him.
September 12, 2024	Moritz pro-Palestinian rally counter-protests	Students for Justice in Palestine hosted a rally outside the Moritz College of Law. A counter-protest began shortly after, with counter-protesters waving Israeli flags. During a pro-Palestinian professor's speech, counter-protesters chanted "free the hostages", which was met with "shame" from pro-Palestinian protesters.
October 7, 2024	Ohio Union pro-Palestinian picket counter-protests	Students for Justice in Palestine hosted a picket outside the Ohio Union. A counter-protest of around 40 students and community members began shortly after, with counter-protesters holding Israeli flags.

== Responses and reactions ==
=== Government officials ===
After the Gaza Solidarity Encampment, Ohio Governor (R) Mike DeWine expressed support for the university's policy in an interview. DeWine said, "I think that Ohio State did well", "what we don't want is any kind of hate", and that he opposes protests "right outside the door of a classroom". The demonstrators at the encampment were on the South Oval, which is not in the vicinity of any classrooms. He said that he supports Ohio and the U.S. "backing the country of Israel". In the same interview, he expressed support for anti-BDS law Ohio Revised Code Section 9.76.

Ohio State Senator (R) Jerry Cirino gave a speech praising President Carter, stating that "university administrators across the country could learn a thing or two from the OSU example, rather than sitting on their hands as violent mobs riot, storm buildings, and engage in running street battles with police, as shockingly occurred at colleges including Columbia and UCLA". Cirino also claimed that "outside agitators" were responsible for the encampments. He concluded his speech by saying "perhaps we should consider introducing legislation that would provide for the termination of faculty members, tenured or not, who participate in, or encourage others to commit, violence on campus" and that "freedom from this horrible fear is every student's God-given right" and is his "sacred duty".

=== University administrators ===
After the Gaza Solidarity Encampment, university administrators including President Carter denied limiting free speech and emphasized how protesters intentionally violated university space rules after being given multiple warnings. At the suggestion of Ohio Attorney General Dave Yost, administrators also referenced anti-BDS law Ohio Revised Code Section 9.76—a state law passed in 2016 and amended in 2022—which prohibits state agencies, including public universities, from boycotting Israel or divesting from companies that have policies in favor of Israel.

=== University faculty ===
After the Gaza Solidarity Encampment, the Faculty Council of the Ohio State University Senate released their first public statement in two years (passed with 36 votes yes, 11 votes no, and 8 votes abstaining), stating "we strongly reject the use of force as a response to the peaceful protests of April 2024 on The Ohio State University's campus" and that "we call on the university to take every action possible to see dropped and expunged all criminal charges related to the peaceful protests that occurred during April 2024 on Ohio State's campus".

OSU's Association of University Professors (AAUP-Ohio State) accused OSU of violating First Amendment principles with "repressive police actions" and of "clamping down" on speech they do not like "in violent and unnecessary ways". AAUP-Ohio State also said they were "alarmed by the shifting goal posts of what counts as proper space in which to speak at Ohio State, and what does not".

Two OSU professors wrote op-eds directed to Carter, one of which claimed his actions were "outrageous, despicable and autocratic", accusing him of turning the university into a "military zone" and suggesting he resign.

After the chalking ban, OSU professor and Faculty & Staff for Justice in Palestine member Pranav Jani claimed that for students "speaking out against genocide [and] speaking out against human rights abuses, it sends a message: 'This is another way we want you to stay quiet.'"

AAUP-Ohio State was critical of the ban in a public statement and interview, accusing the OSU administration of "continuing the assault on free speech by banning the time-honored tradition of chalking on campus". They claimed, "Whether governments or administrators, once they start rolling back free speech, they don't stop".

=== Student governments ===
After the Gaza Solidarity Encampment, the Undergraduate Student Government (USG) and Council of Graduate Students (CGS) at OSU publicly condemned the actions of the university and law enforcement agencies. CGS's statement accused law enforcement of "brutalizing and mocking students, suppressing free speech, and violating civil liberties". SJP co-president Jineen Musa accused USG's condemnation of not being strong enough.

=== Advocacy groups ===
After the Gaza Solidarity Encampment, Ohio's Council on American-Islamic Relations condemned the officers for their "violent crackdown" on students, alleging receiving reports that Muslim protesters "had their hijabs ripped off" during arrests and expressing concern over arrests occurring while Muslim students were in prayer. Scholars at Risk reported that the authority crackdowns on the encampment left "a chilling effect on academic freedom and undermine democratic society generally".

The Foundation for Individual Rights and Expression released a free speech ranking in September 2025, giving OSU a 57.7 out of 100 (an 'F' grade) in free speech.
