= Jerry Cirino =

American politician

Jerry C. Cirino

Member of the Ohio Senate from the 18th district
- Incumbent
- Assumed office January 4, 2021
- Preceded by: John Eklund

Personal details
- Party: Republican
- Spouse: Donna
- Education: Lake Erie College (BA), (MBA)

Jerry C. Cirino is a retired medical device company executive serving as a member of the Ohio Senate representing the 18th district. A Republican, he was elected in 2020, defeating Democrat Betsy Rader with 60% of the vote. Prior to his election he served as Lake County Commissioner.

He received a B.S. in business as well as an M.B.A. from Lake Erie College in Ohio. He is a member of the Roman Catholic Church. He and his wife Donna have nine children.

Cirino was critical of pro-Palestinian student protesters during the Gaza war protests at Ohio State in 2024 and has advocated for Ohio Senate Bill 87—a bill intended to add ethnic intimidation charges to pro-Palestinian student protesters charged with disorderly conduct. On January 22, 2025, Cirino introduced Senate Bill 1, also known as the Advance Ohio Higher Education Act, in the Ohio Senate, This sweeping higher education overhaul, which mandates the elimination of most diversity, equity, and inclusion (DEI) offices and forces the closure of identity-focused centers, led to the closure of multiple diversity-related departments and centers across the state's public universities and colleges in 2025 and 2026.

In May 2026, a blogger sent a mocking text to Cirino that called him the derisive nickname "young Mussolini" and contained a pornographic image of the character Shrek. In response, Cirino emailed the police chief of Kirtland, Ohio, and asked for the blogger to be arrested. The blogger was charged with the crime of telecommunications harassment. An article by the Foundation for Individual Rights and Expression opined that the text was protected speech under the First Amendment to the United States Constitution and that the journalist should not have been charged with telecommunications harassment. The blogger was convicted and sentenced to a $200 fine plus court costs.
