= Banner drop =

Placement of a banner in a public area as a protest tactic

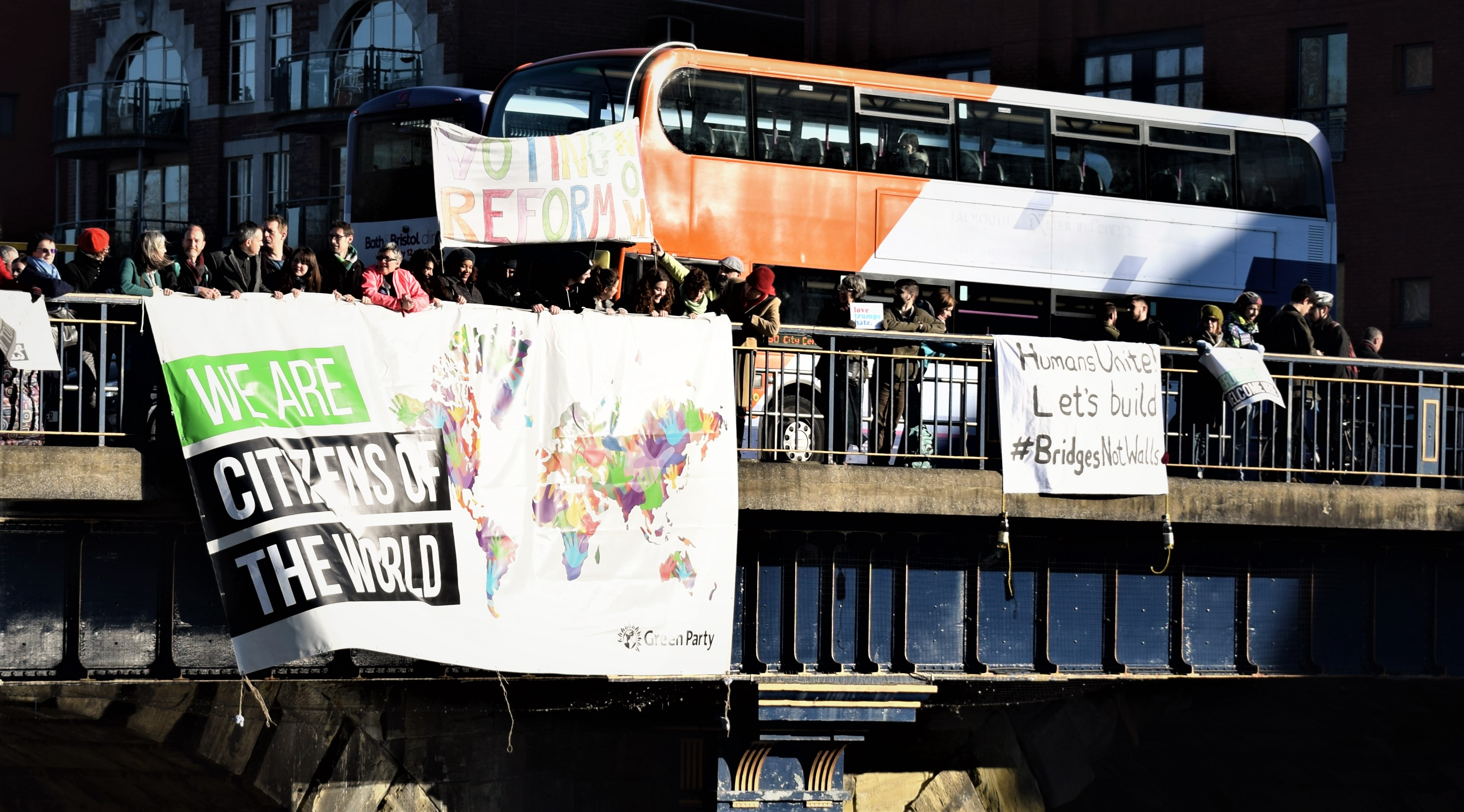
A banner drop hanging from a bridge in a public location

A banner drop is the protest action of putting a banner in a public place to spread a message and raise awareness. The banner may target a corporation, a law, a political campaign, or any activism. The banner may itself be dropped on an activists' target, or in conjunction with the beginning of a campaign.

Performing a banner drop may constitute criminal vandalism and criminal trespassing depending on where the banner is placed and on the legal jurisdiction in which the activity occurred.

There are several ways in which banners are constructed and placed. Most often, a banner is decorated with an activist slogan or picture using paint, dye or, in some cases, screen printing. The banner is then often either tied to the target or secured to it using ropes and weights. Alternatively they can be held by activists within and atop pedestrian walkways

== Global banner drop ==
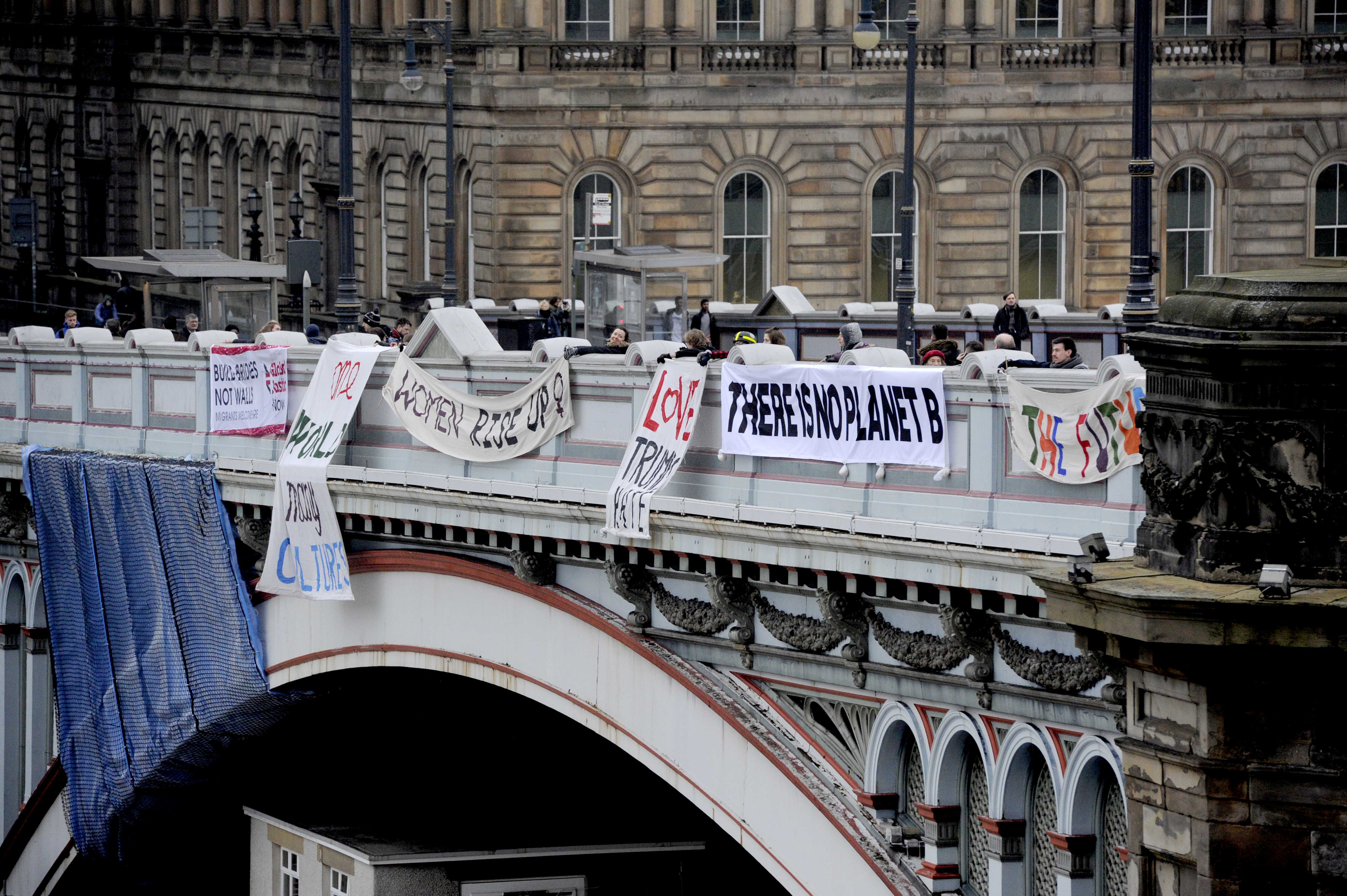
Banners hung on North Bridge, Edinburgh, 2017 #BridgesNotWalls

#BridgesNotWalls was a global banner drop campaign to protest against Donald Trump's stance on immigration. On January 20, 2017, the day of Trump's presidential inauguration, activists around the world dropped banners from over 200 iconic bridges across five continents.

In London, banners were dropped from at least eight bridges spanning the River Thames including the Tower Bridge, London Bridge, Southwark, Millennium, Blackfriars, Waterloo, Westminster and Vauxhall bridges. Other historic bridges were scenes of banner drops including Ironbridge in England, North Bridge in Scotland, Dyfi Bridge in Wales, Oberbaum Bridge in Germany, Auckland Harbour Bridge in New Zealand, as well as bridges in Australia, France, Ireland, Nepal, and the United States. Rallies were also held in Japan, the Philippines, Belgium, Tokyo, and Moscow.

== Gallery ==
Banner drops can vary greatly. Here are some samples of protest banner drops around the world.

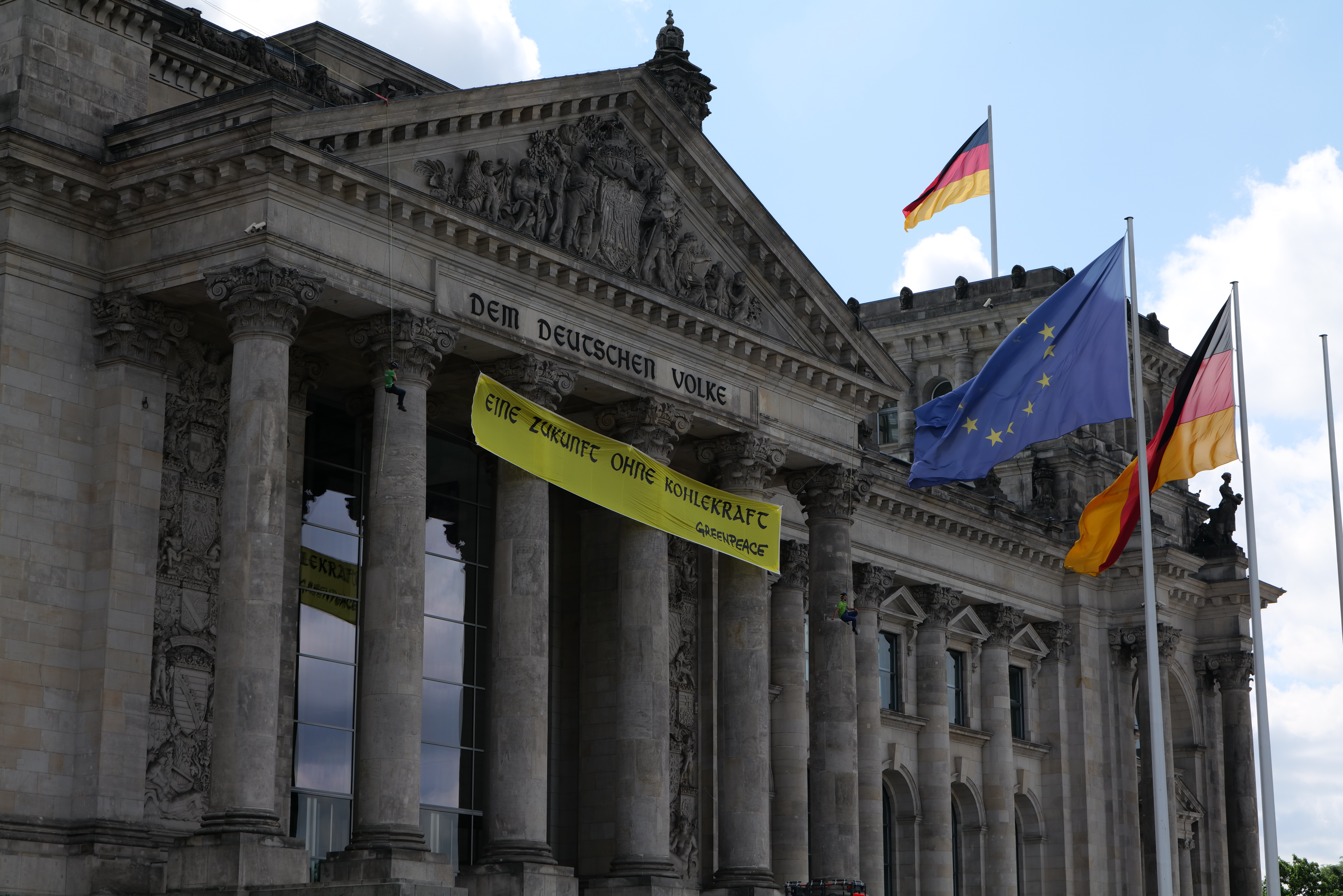
Germany 2020, on the Reichstag building protesting the coal phase-out law

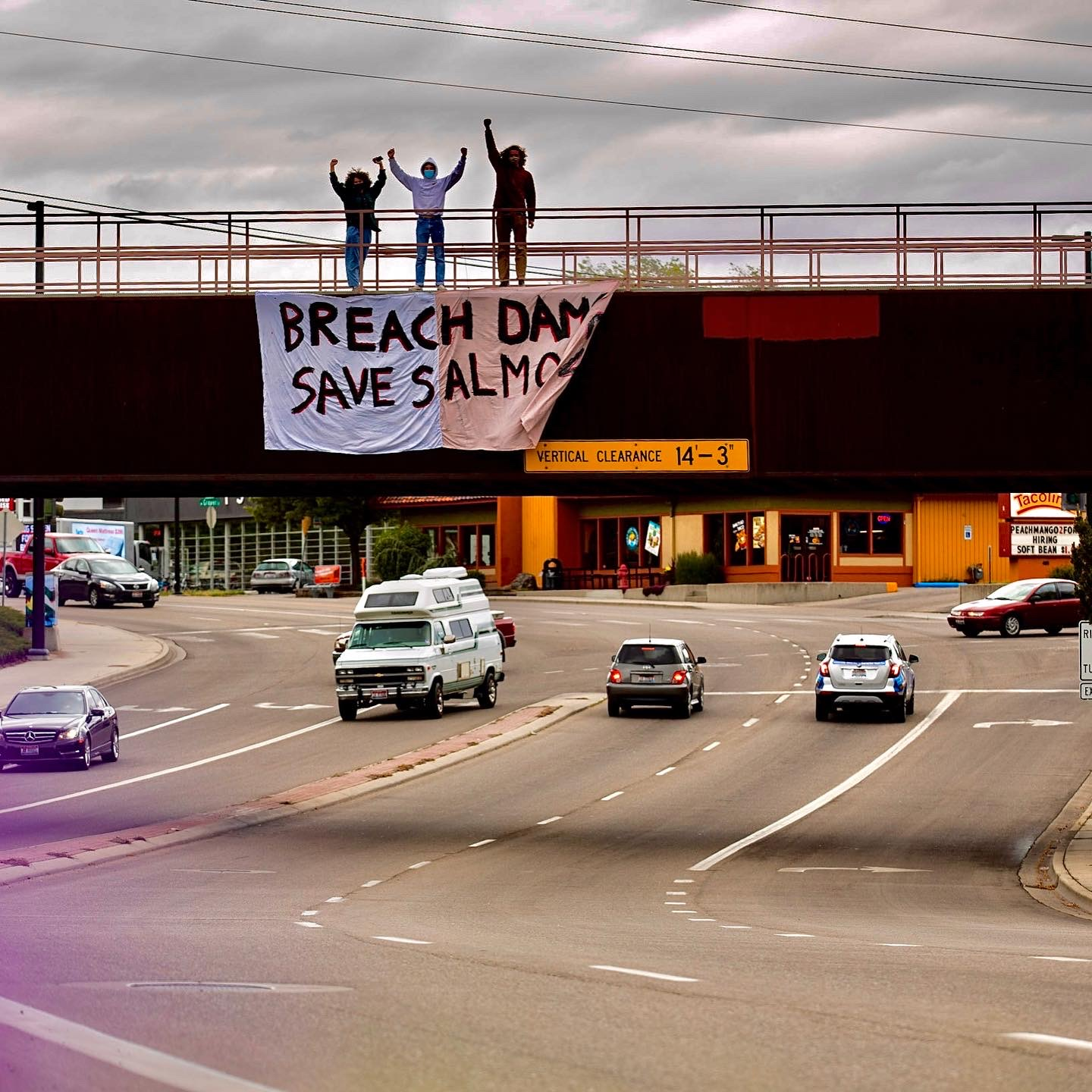
US 2021, activists for wild salmon conservation

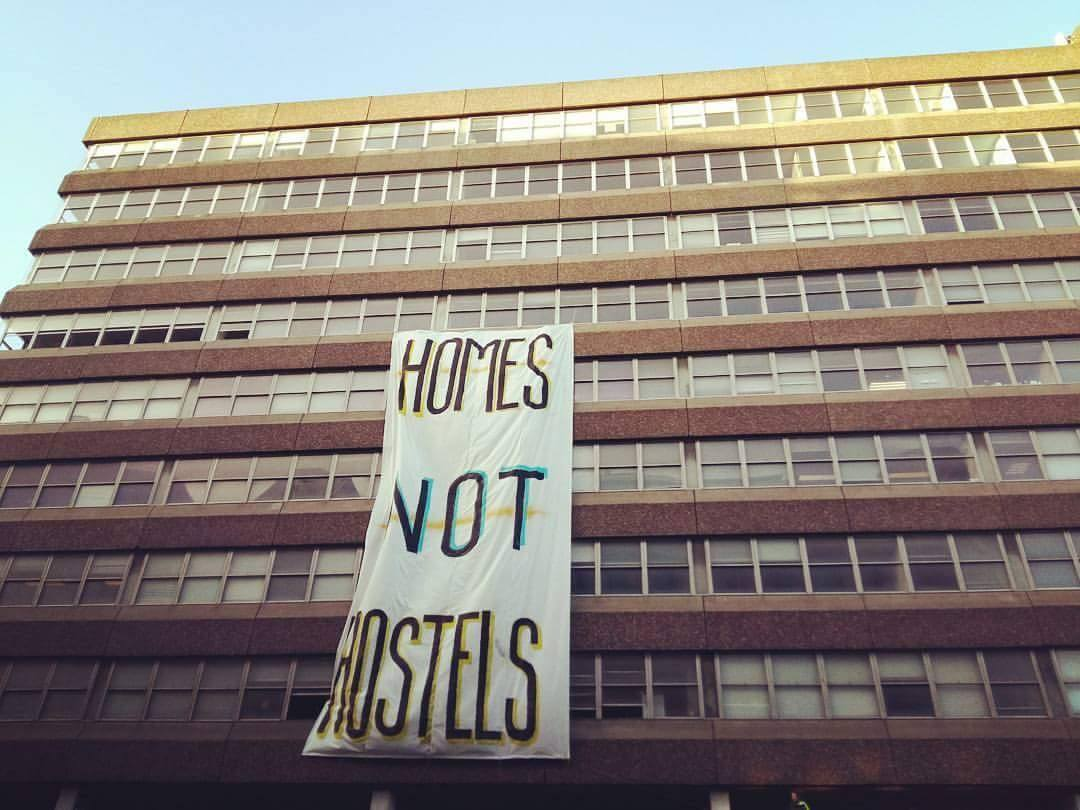
Ireland 2017, protest-squatting in an office building slated for demolition

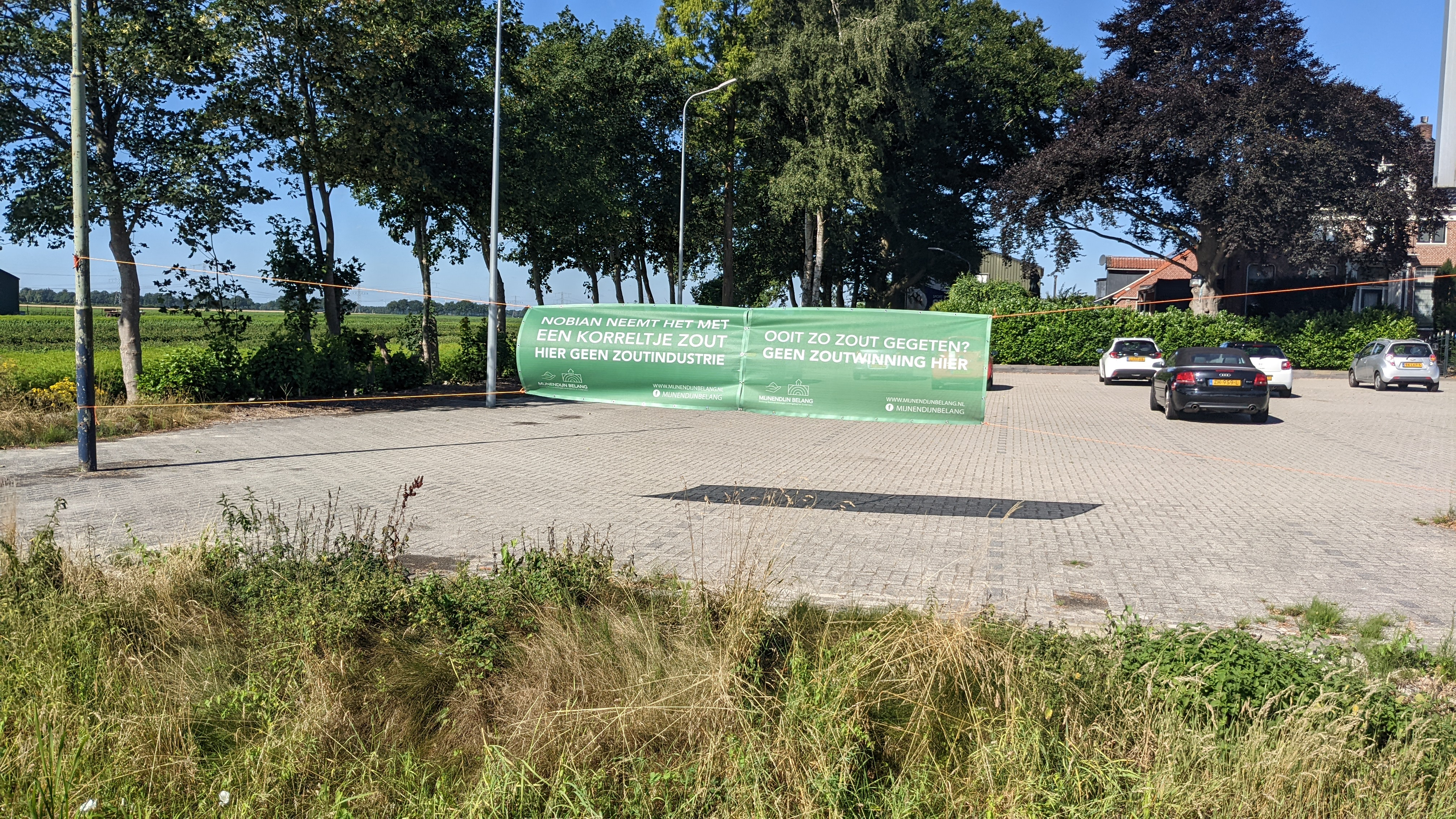
Netherlands 2022, protesting salt mining

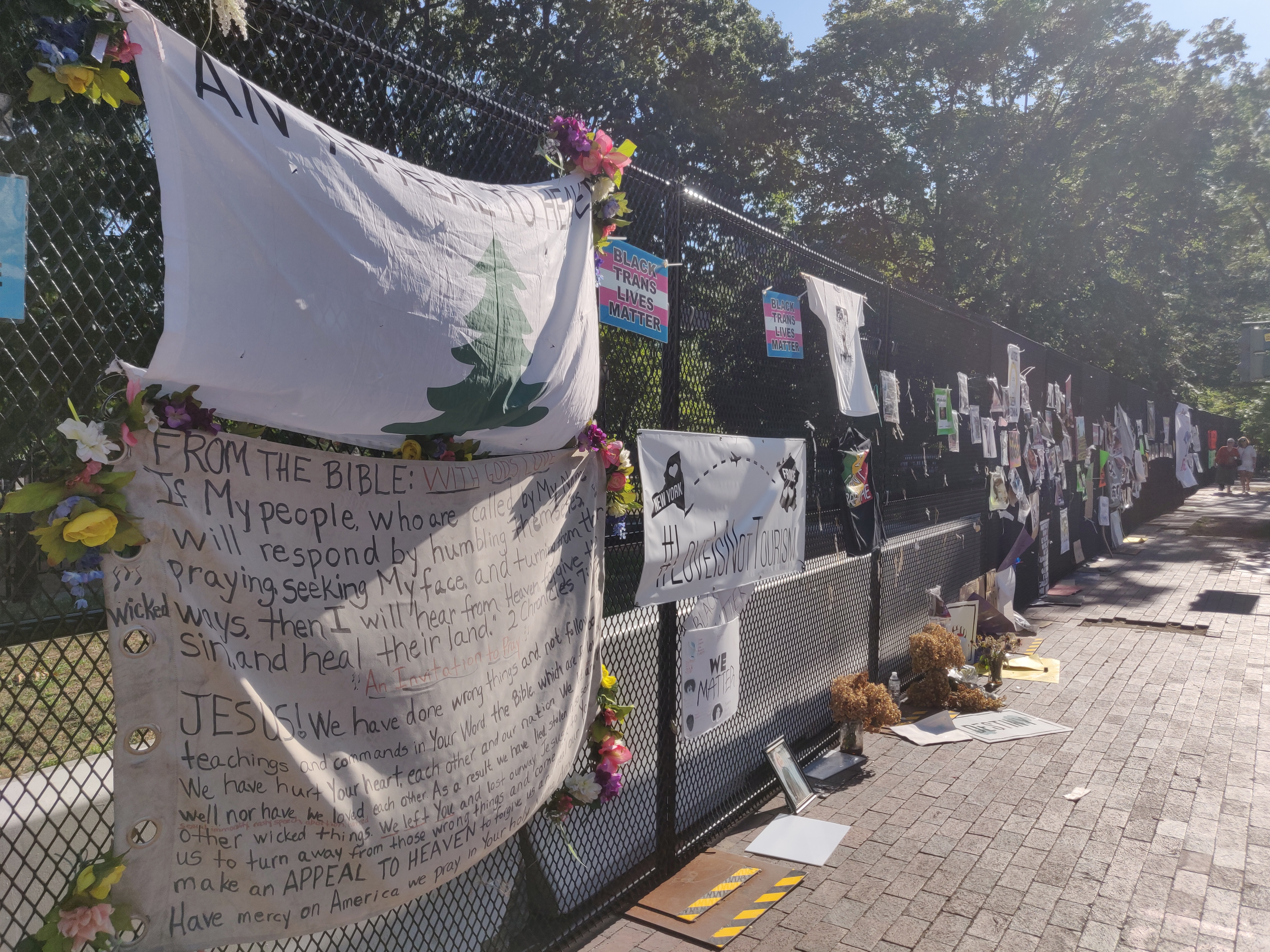
US 2020, the fence erected around Lafayette Square following the clearing of the park for a Trump photo op

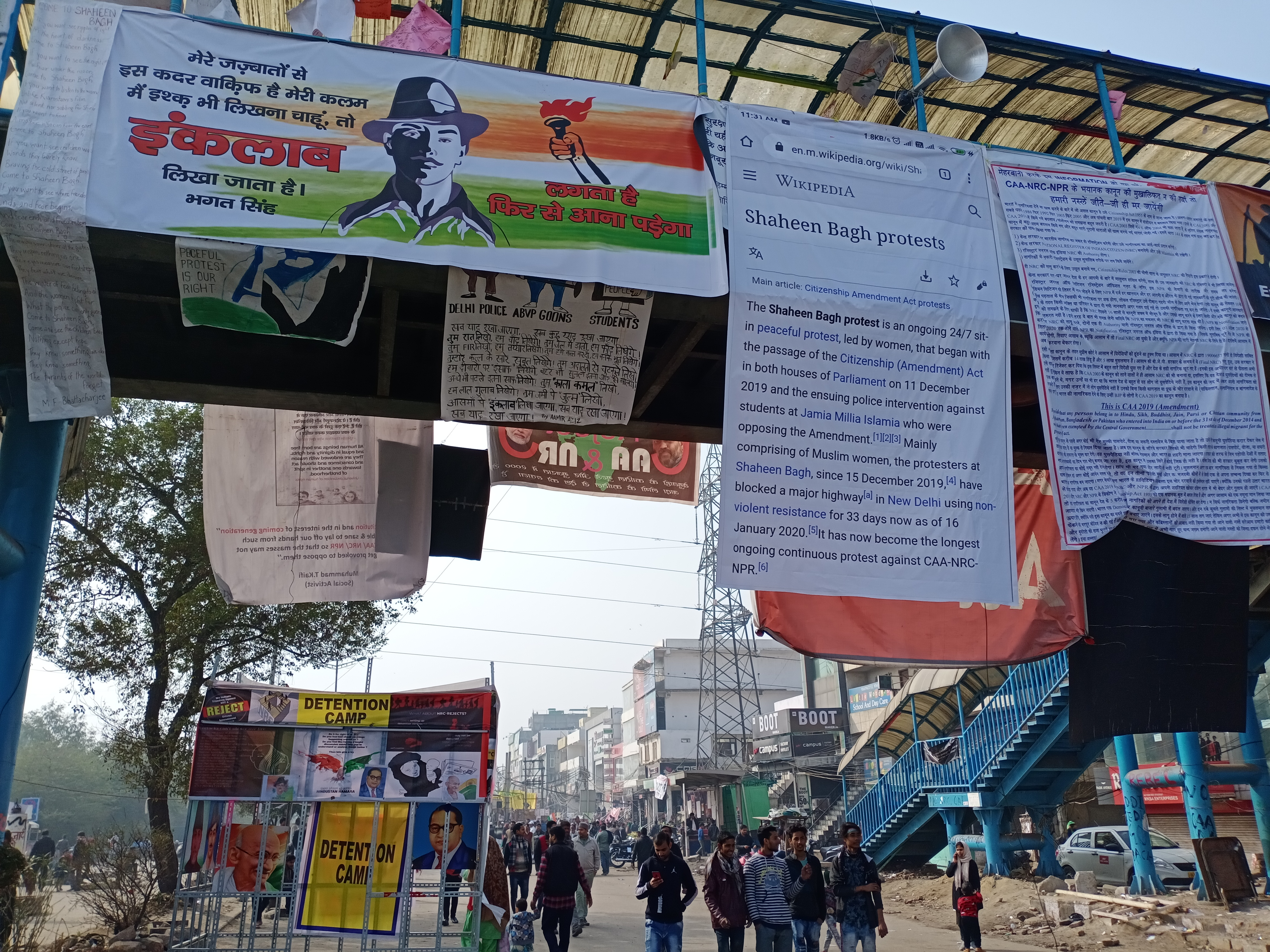
India 2020, a Wikipedia page copied onto a drop banner, Shaheen Bagh protests

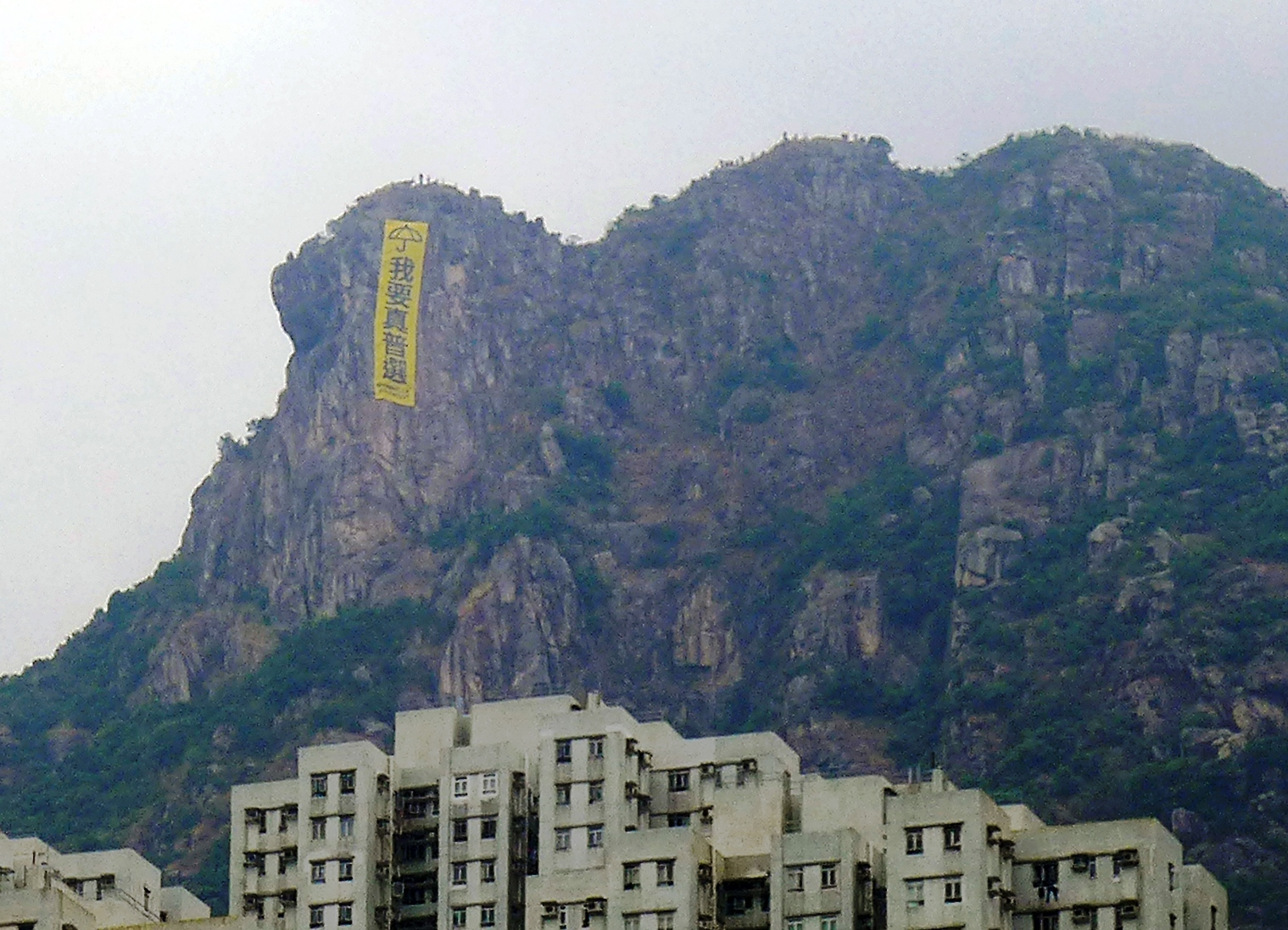
Hong Kong 2014, vertical banner on Lion Rock, Umbrella Revolution

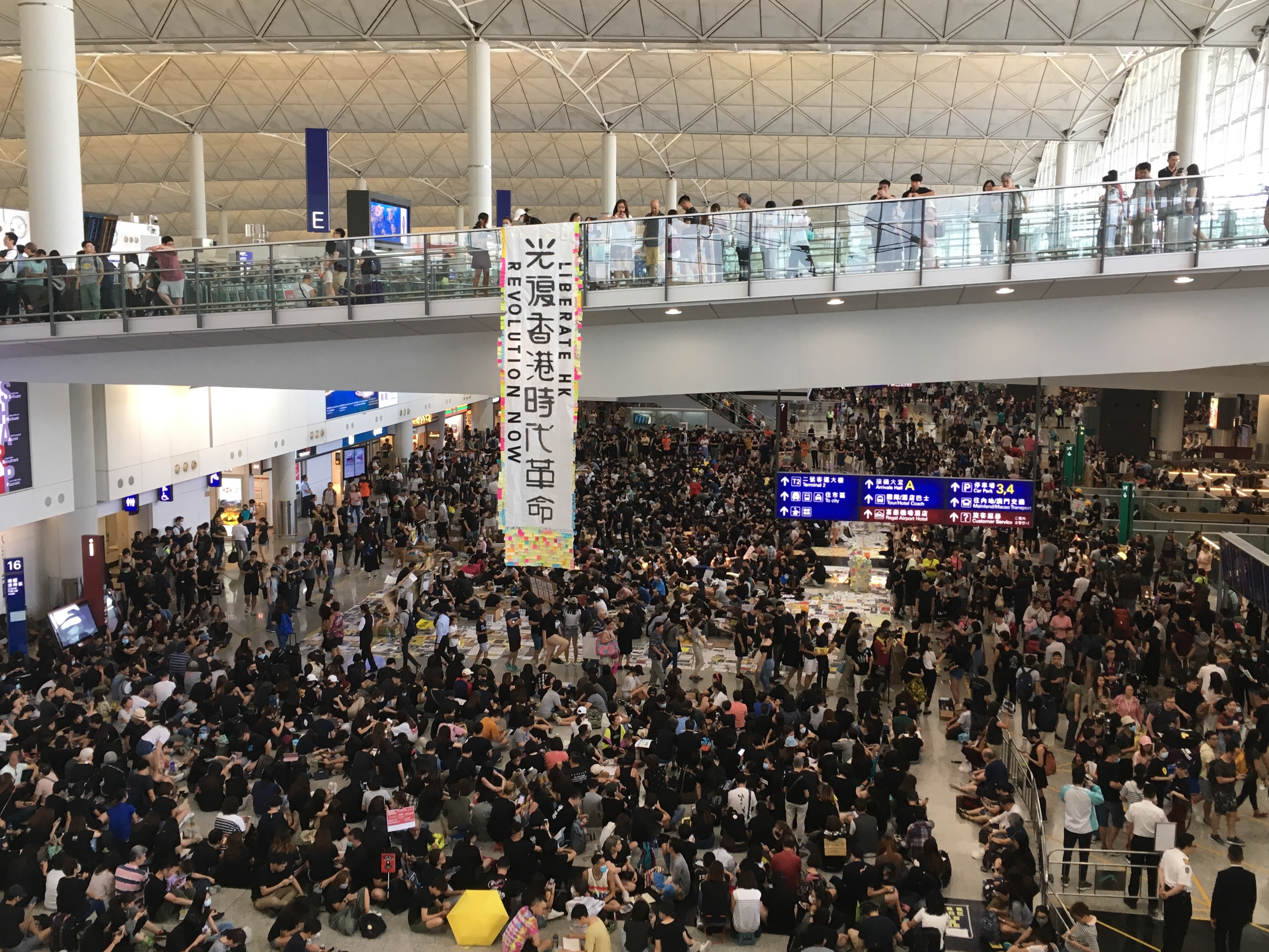
Hong Kong 2019, Liberate Hong Kong banner inside airport

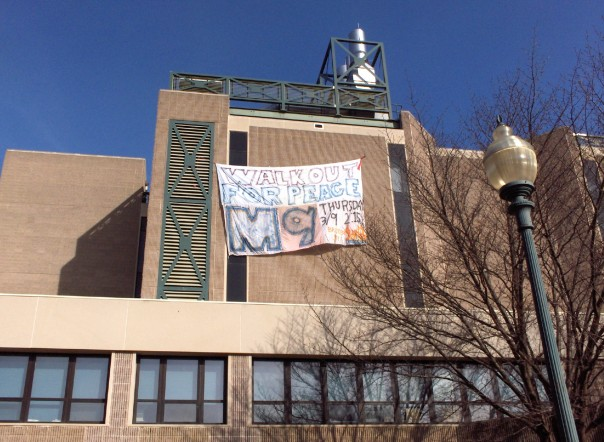
US 2006, on the campus of Central Connecticut State University

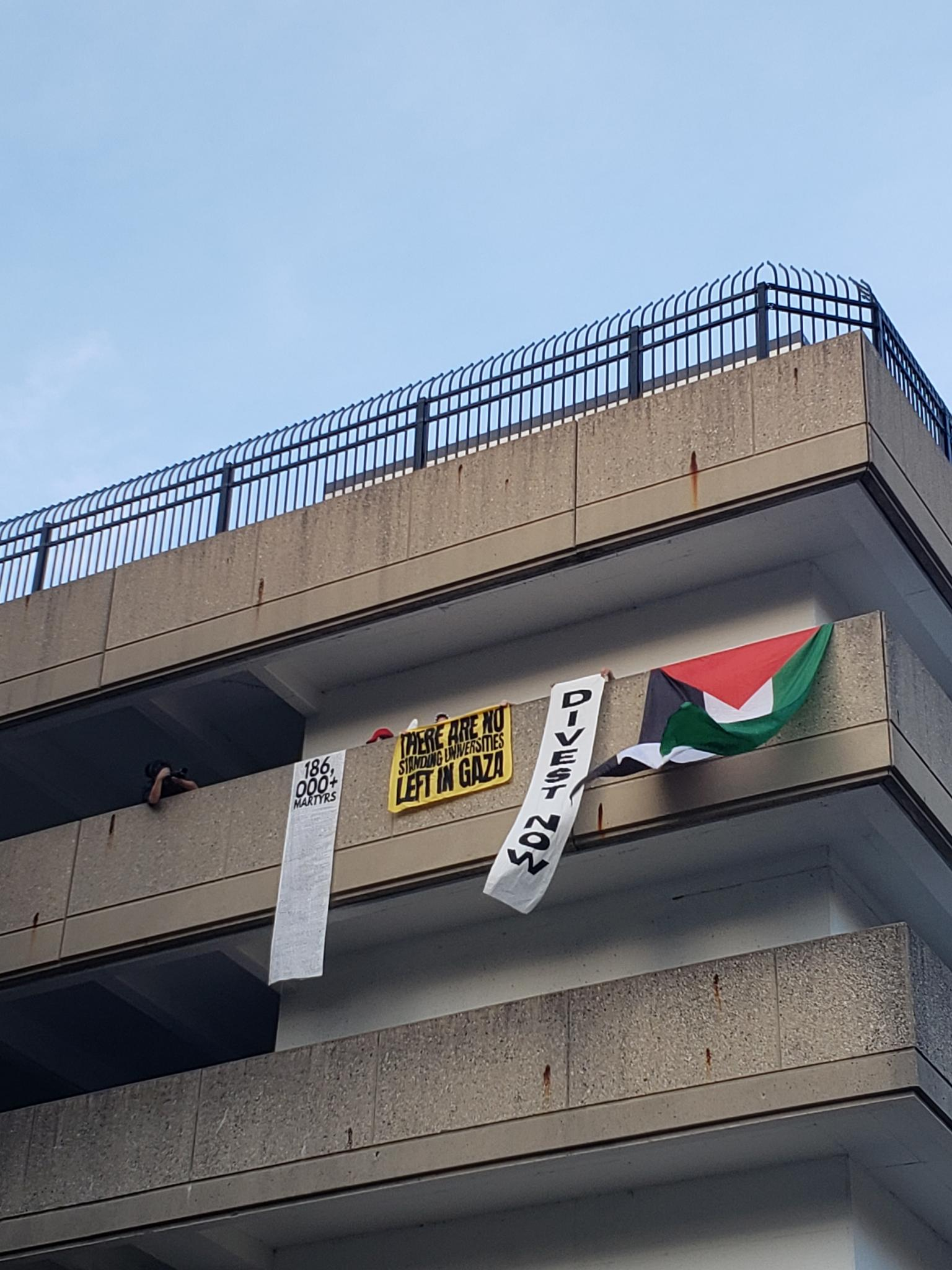
US 2024, banner drop during the Gaza war protests at Ohio State University

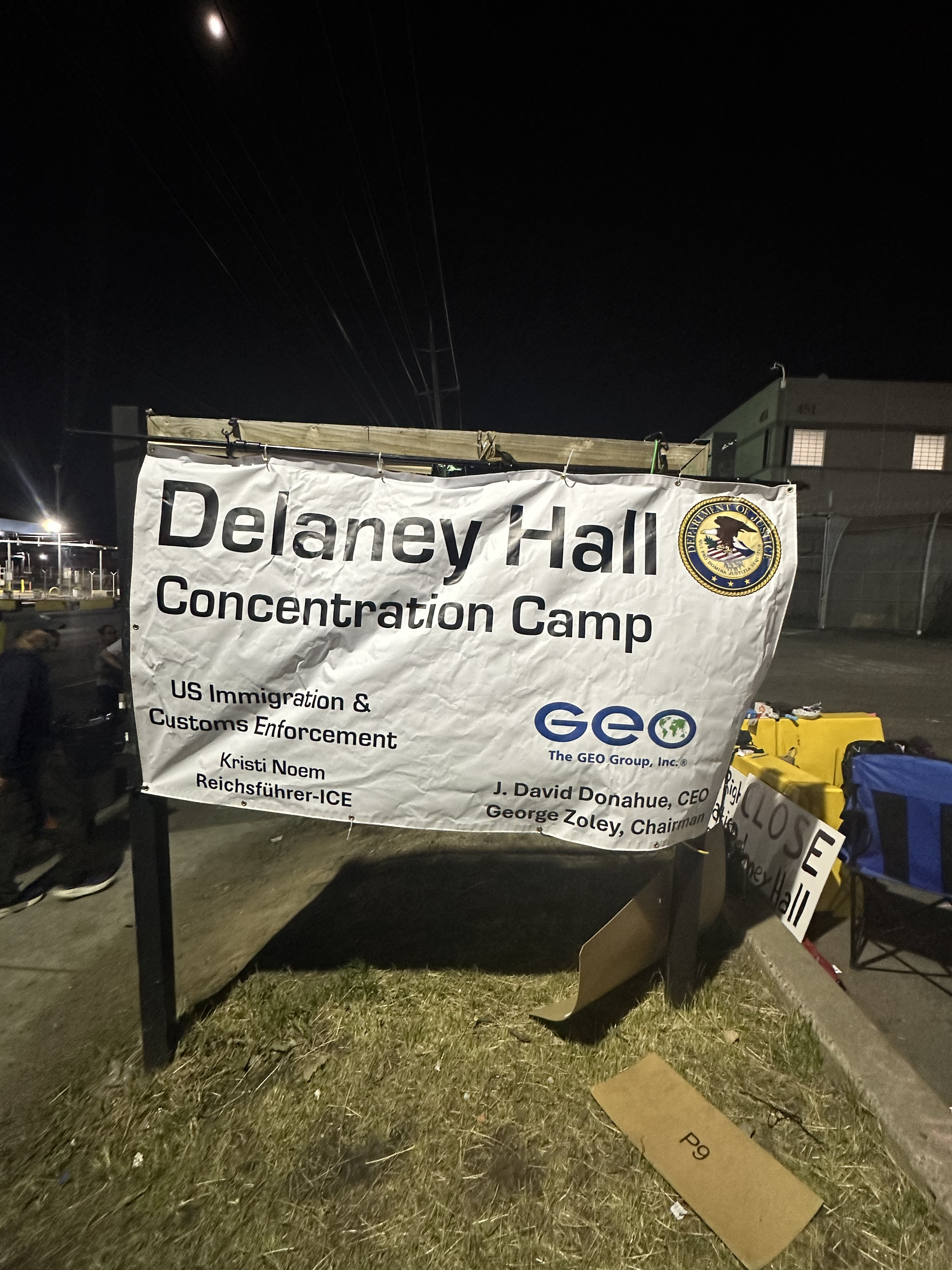
US 2026, during the Delaney Hall protests

== See also ==
- Vertical banner
