= Ohio Senate Bill 1 (2025) =

Ohio law passed in 2025

Advance Ohio Higher Education Act

136th Ohio General Assembly
- Long title: To amend sections 3335.02, 3335.09, 3337.01, 3339.01, 3341.02, 3343.02, 3344.01, 3345.45, 3350.10, 3352.01, 3356.01, 3359.01, 3361.01, 3362.01, 3364.01, 4117.14, and 4117.15; to enact new section 3333.045 and sections 3345.029, 3345.0216, 3345.0217, 3345.0218, 3345.0219, 3345.382, 3345.451, 3345.452, 3345.453, 3345.454, 3345.455, 3345.456, 3345.591, 3345.80, and 3345.88; and to repeal section 3333.045 of the Revised Code to enact the Advance Ohio Higher Education Act regarding the operation of state institutions of higher education.
- Citation: O.H. Legis. Assemb. . Reg. Sess. 2025-2026 (2025).
- Territorial extent: Ohio
- Enacted by: Ohio Senate
- Enacted: February 12, 2025
- Enacted by: Ohio House of Representatives
- Enacted: March 19, 2025
- Signed by: Mike DeWine
- Signed: March 28, 2025
- Effective: June 27, 2025

Legislative history

Initiating chamber: Ohio Senate
- Introduced by: Jerry R. Cirino
- Introduced: January 22, 2025
- First reading: February 12, 2025
- Voting summary: 21 voted for; 11 voted against
- Second reading: March 26, 2025
- Voting summary: 20 voted for; 11 voted against

Revising chamber: Ohio House of Representatives
- Voting summary: 59 voted for; 34 voted against
- Passed: March 19, 2025

Related legislation
- Florida Senate Bill 266
- Status: In force

Ohio Senate Bill 1 (S.B. 1), also known as the Advance Ohio Higher Education Act, is a 2025 law in the U.S. state of Ohio that bans diversity, equity, and inclusion (DEI)-based hiring and enrollment in universities as well as banning school faculty from going on strike. It was signed by Governor Mike DeWine on March 28, 2025, and took effect on June 27, 2025.

The bill affects public colleges and universities. Part of its intention is to support "intellectual diversity". Much of the controversy surrounding S.B. 1 involves it potentially targeting the left-wing and being ambiguous with its wording. It was passed along party lines in both chambers, with all Ohio Democrats opposing and five Ohio Republicans; two in the Senate and three in the House. A similar bill, Senate Bill 83, was proposed in 2023 by the same author but was never voted on.

== Provisions ==
S.B. 1 bans school faculty from going on strike in the state of Ohio. It bans hiring and scholarships based on current diversity, equity, and inclusion (DEI) programs. It also restricts universities from commenting on anything "controversial", more specifically relating to political issues. An American civics course would also be required for students in public universities. Schools that violate the law would have state funding revoked.

== Support for the bill ==
Lieutenant Governor Jim Tressel congratulated the author of S.B. 1, Jerry Cirino, on the passage of the bill.

== University responses ==
=== Kent State University ===
In order to comply with Ohio Senate Bill 1, Kent State University announced the closure of its LGBTQ+ Center, Women's Center, and Multicultural Center effective June 27, 2026; and announced the elimination of 19 programs.

=== Ohio State University ===
==== Compliance with the bill ====
In late February 2025, before the bill was passed, Ohio State University (OSU) officials announced the closure of two DEI-focused offices and the elimination of 16 professional staff positions, actions attributed to federal directives and widely read on campus as aligning with S.B. 1's restrictions. After the law took effect on June 27, 2025, the university centralized guidance, timelines and FAQs for S.B. 1 compliance and began rolling updates across policy pages and sites.

On June 25, 2025, OSU updated its "Philosophy on Institutional and Leadership Statements", codifying that the university and its units will not "endorse or oppose" controversial beliefs or policies except on matters directly affecting operations, funding or the academic mission, in alignment with S.B. 1. In September 2025, the university further prohibited most land acknowledgements in official communications while noting that faculty retain academic freedom to discuss them when relevant to coursework, a change widely understood as an S.B. 1 compliance measure.

In Housing and Student Life, OSU directed resident advisers in August 2025 to limit floor decorations and "welcome" programming to university-spirit themes; a spokesperson linked the change in part to S.B. 1, and coverage highlighted the guidance as permitting OSU-themed decorations "not weird ones".

OSU paused programming for The Women's Place and the President & Provost's Council on Women effective June 27, 2025, "to ensure compliance with Senate Bill 1", and issued implementation guidance discontinuing DEI committees and awards while allowing employee resource groups to continue only if open to all and supported on an equal basis without DEI training. Relatedly, the same guidance instructed that registered student organizations receive funding and administrative support on an equal basis with compliant nondiscrimination language in their constitutions, and that centrally generated "campaign" email signatures be paused for S.B. 1 review while individuals could continue to add pronouns manually in self-created signatures.

For teaching and curriculum, OSU published a required syllabus statement on "Intellectual Diversity" and FAQs clarifying that S.B. 1 does not ban topics but requires "the fullest degree of intellectual diversity" and the freedom for students to reach their own conclusions on controversial beliefs and policies; the university also stated that no curricular changes take effect in Autumn 2025 and that the new three-credit American civics requirement applies to students graduating in 2030 and after.

Faculty evaluation and post-tenure review were revised via an interim board policy effective August 25, 2025, to align with S.B. 1 and Ohio law, standardizing annual-review ratings and establishing a post-tenure process that can lead to sanctions up to termination.

Consistent with S.B. 1 transparency requirements, OSU also began publishing a monthly list of invited speakers paid more than $500 (excluding RSO events), and maintained a running log of S.B. 1 site updates implementing that disclosure. In parallel, the university adopted restrictions on partnerships associated with the People's Republic of China consistent with S.B. 1, including prohibiting PRC government grants to faculty, updating gift-acceptance rules, and instituting reporting of new or renewed academic partnerships in China to the state chancellor.

On August 14, 2025, one week before the start of the Fall 2025 semester at OSU, and compliant with SB1, OSU invoked Section 3320.08 of the newly passed "CAMPUS" Act to post an announcement to their website called "Chalking Not Permitted on Campus", banning all chalking on campus under Ohio law, including pro-Palestinian chalking. The announcement stated that OSU "reserves the right to charge for the cost of any repairs required due to removal" of chalk, that "students found responsible would be subject to potential conduct referral", and provided an email address for reporting "chalking or other non-compliant signage".

==== Shred SB1 rally ====
Students protest DEI office closures in front of OSU administrator building during the Shred SB1 rally

On March 4, 2025, a 1-4 p.m. rally branded "Shred SB1" gathered at the William Thompson statue on the Oval, organized by AAUP–Ohio State and the Ohio Student Association. This rally was organized following OSU's announcement of the closure of two DEI-focused offices and the elimination of 16 professional staff positions—moves critics linked to a broader climate around S.B. 1 and to contemporaneous federal directives in the same week. On the same day as the rally, a social-media post by President Trump threatened to cut federal funding for institutions that "allow illegal protests" and to have protesters expelled, arrested, or deported.

Reporting described "hundreds" of participants and more than a dozen speakers in a statewide day of action; speakers included OSU faculty from over 20 disciplines, Ohio House Representative Munira Abdullahi (D), union representatives (Ohio Federation of Teachers, Wex Workers United, IATSE Local 12), and student organizations such as the National Society of Black Engineers, Students for Justice in Palestine, and Jews for Justice in Palestine, with chants like "S.B. 1 is a war on people". University officials said they supported participants' freedom of expression during the protest.

==== Responses ====
Hundreds of students at Ohio State University testified against S.B. 1 and promised to leave the state if it became law. Opponents submitted more than 830 written testimonies and over 200 in-person statements—well over 1,000 public comments against S.B. 1—with only a small fraction in support; contemporaneous coverage likewise noted "hundreds" of opponent testimonies that "significantly outweighed" supporter submissions. These testimonies have drawn the support of several Ohio Democratic politicians including Casey Weinstein.

Labor groups emphasized provisions curbing collective bargaining and strikes; the president of the Ohio Federation of Teachers warned S.B. 1 would "take away... rights to have a voice in what their workplace looks like". Opponents highlighted potential academic and economic impacts, arguing the bill would deter recruitment, degrade educational quality, and risk loss of federal research dollars if faculty depart the state.

Ohio House Representative Munira Abdullahi (D) accused OSU of "pre-compliance" with the bill, adopting their policy to comply before it was passed. Faculty organizers also described a "chilling" effect on course content, with one instructor reporting that faculty at OSU now feared teaching material on Palestinian artists. Another professor described a "sense of unease" after the bill was passed and concerns over which class materials are acceptable to teach under the bill.

=== Youngstown State University ===
Due to a request primarily by Youngstown State University staff to put it to the voters as a referendum, Ohio Attorney General Dave Yost released a statement that it meets the requirements and can begin the process of gathering signatures. Yost did not publicly oppose the bill.
