= Javaune Adams-Gaston =

American psychologist and academic administrator

Javaune Adams-Gaston, Ph.D.
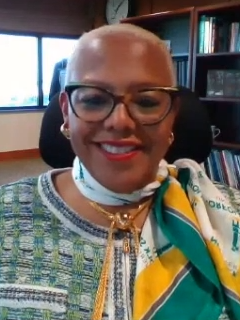
- Adams-Gaston in 2022

President of Norfolk State University
- Incumbent
- Assumed office June 2019
- Preceded by: Melvin Stith

Personal details
- Education: Iowa State University
- Occupation: Psychologist, academic administrator

Javaune Marie Adams-Gaston is an American psychologist and academic administrator. She is the seventh president of Norfolk State University.

== Life ==
Adams-Gaston completed a Ph.D. at Iowa State University. She has published multiple articles during her career.

Adams-Gaston had a practice for 25 years as a licensed psychologist and as an educator. At the University of Maryland, Adams-Gaston held numerous positions including psychologist, associate dean in academic affairs, assistant athletic director, equity administrator, and graduate faculty member.

Adams-Gaston worked as the senior vice president for student life at Ohio State University.

Adams-Gaston became the seventh president of Norfolk State University (NSU) in June 2019. She succeeded interim president Melvin Stith. She has advocated for increased financial support for the benefit of students, faculty, and staff and the stability of the institution. Adams-Gaston influenced the receipt of a $40 million gift from philanthropist MacKenzie Scott, the largest single gift in NSU's history. She has led the university in successful efforts to secure grants and partnerships from corporations such as Microsoft, Netflix, Apple, IBM, Dominion Energy, and others.

In March 2022, Adams-Gaston was one of 18 appointees to U.S. president Joe Biden's board of advisors on Historically black colleges and universities.
