= 2026 Ohio House of Representatives election =

- November 3, 2026

All 99 seats in the Ohio House of Representatives 50 seats needed for a majority
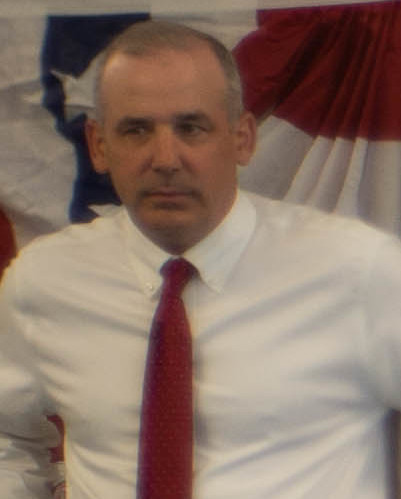

	Majority party	Minority party
Leader	Matt Huffman	Dani Isaacsohn
Party	Republican	Democratic
Leader's seat	93rd district	24th district
Last election	65 seats, 65.7%	34 seats, 34.3%
Seats before	65	34
Seats after	53	42
Seat change	▼12	▲12
- Result TBD; Republican hold Democratic hold Democratic gain
Speaker before election
Matt Huffman
Republican
Elected Speaker
TBD (Note: With the Republican's controling the House, it is likely the Speaker will be a Republican. However, it is not certain until one is formally elected in January)

The 2026 Ohio House of Representatives election was held on November 3, 2026, alongside the other 2026 United States elections. Voters will elect members of the Ohio House of Representatives in all 99 of the U.S. state of Ohio's legislative districts to serve a two-year term. A primary election was held on May 5, 2026.

== Outgoing incumbents ==
=== Republicans ===
1. District 31: Bill Roemer is term-limited.
2. District 35: Steve Demetriou is retiring to run for State Senate.
3. District 39: Phil Plummer is retiring to run for State Senate.
4. District 44: Josh Williams is retiring to run for Ohio's 9th congressional district.
5. District 57: Jamie Callender is term-limited.
6. District 61: Beth Lear is retiring and instead opted to unsuccessfully run for state senate.
7. District 81: Jim Hoops is term-limited and instead unsuccessfully ran for State Senate.

=== Democrats ===
1. District 7: Allison Russo is term-limited and is instead running for secretary of state.
2. District 18: Juanita Brent is term-limited and is instead running for Cleveland City Council.
3. District 19: Phil Robinson is term-limited.
4. District 20: Terrence Upchurch is term-limited.
5. District 53: Joe Miller is term-limited and instead running for state senate.
6. District 58: Lauren McNally is retiring to run for Mahoning County commissioner.

== Campaign ==
Prominent issues in statehouse campaigns include property taxes and AI data centers, both of which have produced statewide ballot initiative campaigns in response to legislative inaction. This is a shift from the culture war issues that had dominated previous cycles. This shift, as well as fatigue with the second Trump presidency, is contributing to a sense among Republicans that they could lose their veto-proof supermajority in the chamber.

== Predictions ==
Source	Ranking	As of
Sabato's Crystal Ball	Likely R	January 22, 2026
State Navigate	Safe R	October 24, 2026

== Summary of results by district ==
District	2024 Pres.	Incumbent	Party	Elected representative	Outcome
1	D+61.5	Dontavius Jarrells	Dem	Dontavius Jarrells	Dem
2	D+49.9	Latyna Humphrey	Dem	Charity King	Dem
3	D+59.1	Ismail Mohamed	Dem	Ismail Mohamed	Dem
4	D+18.3	Beryl Piccolantonio	Dem	Beryl Piccolantonio	Dem
5	D+16.5	Meredith Lawson-Rowe	Dem	Meredith Lawson-Rowe	Dem
6	D+11.5	Christine Cockley	Dem	Christine Cockley	Dem
7	D+42.1	Allison Russo	Dem	Ukeme Awakessian Jetter	Dem
8	D+32.3	Anita Somani	Dem	Anita Somani	Dem
9	D+35.3	Munira Abdullahi	Dem	Munira Abdullahi	Dem
10	R+1.7	Mark Sigrist	Dem	Mark Sigrist	Dem
11	D+14.7	Crystal Lett	Dem	Crystal Lett	Dem
12	R+44.4	Brian Stewart	Rep	Brian Stewart	Rep
13	D+48.8	Tristan Rader	Dem	Tristan Rader	Dem
14	R+1.5	Sean Brennan	Dem	Sean Brennan	Dem
15	D+3.0	Chris Glassburn	Dem	Chris Glassburn	Dem
16	D+18.7	Bride Rose Sweeney	Dem	Scott DiMauro	Dem
17	R+6.4	Mike Dovilla	Rep	Megan Coy	Dem
18	D+77.3	Juanita Brent	Dem	Davida Russell	Dem
19	D+12.1	Phil Robinson	Dem	Nicole Sigurdson	Dem
20	D+73.2	Terrence Upchurch	Dem	Eugene Miller	Dem
21	D+53.6	Eric Synenberg	Dem	Eric Synenberg	Dem
22	D+69.3	Darnell Brewer	Dem	Darnell Brewer	Dem
23	R+0.7	Dan Troy	Dem	Dan Troy	Dem
24	D+44.6	Dani Isaacsohn	Dem	Dani Isaacsohn	Dem
25	D+65.7	Cecil Thomas	Dem	Cecil Thomas	Dem
26	D+41.2	Ashley Bryant Bailey	Dem	Ashley Bryant Bailey	Dem
27	D+12.4	Rachel Baker	Dem	Rachel Baker	Dem
28	D+14.2	Karen Brownlee	Dem	Karen Brownlee	Dem
29	R+10.8	Cindy Abrams	Rep	TBD	
30	R+34.0	Mike Odioso	Rep	Mike Odioso	Rep
31	R+1.0	Bill Roemer	Rep	J. Noah Spinner	Dem
32	R+14.5	Jack Daniels	Rep	Jack Daniels	Rep
33	D+43.2	Veronica Sims	Dem	Veronica Sims	Dem
34	D+7.6	Derrick Hall	Dem	Derrick Hall	Dem
35	R+1.4	Steve Demetriou	Rep	Samantha Salamon	Dem
36	D+1.0	Andrea White	Rep	Rose Lounsbury	Dem
37	R+8.2	Tom Young	Rep	TBD	
38	D+49.2	Desiree Tims	Dem	Desiree Tims	Dem
39	R+5.7	Phil Plummer	Rep	Daquan Neal	Dem
40	R+51.3	Rodney Creech	Rep	Rodney Creech	Rep
41	D+18.0	Erika White	Dem	Erika White	Dem
42	D+27.7	Elgin Rogers Jr.	Dem	Elgin Rogers Jr.	Dem
43	D+19.0	Michele Grim	Dem	Michele Grim	Dem
44	R+10.1	Josh Williams	Rep	TBD	
45	R+19.3	Jennifer Gross	Rep	Jennifer Gross	Rep
46	R+29.5	Thomas Hall	Rep	Thomas Hall	Rep
47	R+24.3	Diane Mullins	Rep	Diane Mullins	Rep
48	R+25.8	Scott Oelslager	Rep	Christina Hagan	Rep
49	R+2.6	Jim Thomas	Rep	Krista Allison	Dem
50	R+28.5	Matthew Kishman	Rep	Matthew Kishman	Rep
51	R+44.9	Jodi Salvo	Rep	Jodi Salvo	Rep
52	R+4.1	Gayle Manning	Rep	Mike Baker	Dem
53	D+2.7	Joe Miller	Dem	Matt Lundy	Dem
54	R+29.5	Kellie Deeter	Rep	Kellie Deeter	Rep
55	R+43.2	Michelle Teska	Rep	Michelle Teska	Rep
56	R+18.4	Adam Mathews	Rep	Adam Mathews	Rep
57	R+20.9	Jamie Callender	Rep	Jesse Styles	Rep
58	D+4.6	Lauren McNally	Dem	John Boccieri	Dem
59	R+24.3	Tex Fischer	Rep	Tex Fischer	Rep
60	R+0.8	Brian Lorenz	Rep	Shelby Kimball	Dem
61	R+19.5	Beth Lear	Rep	Shawn Stevens	Rep
62	R+28.8	Jean Schmidt	Rep	Jean Schmidt	Rep
63	R+50.5	Adam Bird	Rep	Adam Bird	Rep
64	R+12.9	Nick Santucci	Rep	Nick Santucci	Rep
65	R+28.5	David Thomas	Rep	David Thomas	Rep
66	R+23.7	Sean Hutson	Rep	Sean Hutson	Rep
67	R+36.5	Melanie Miller	Rep	Melanie Miller	Rep
68	R+19.8	Thaddeus Claggett	Rep	Thaddeus Claggett	Rep
69	R+50.7	Kevin D. Miller	Rep	Kevin D. Miller	Rep
70	R+16.9	Brian Lampton	Rep	Brian Lampton	Rep
71	R+39.9	Levi Dean	Rep	Levi Dean	Rep
72	R+16.7	Heidi Workman	Rep	Heidi Workman	Rep
73	R+16.6	Jeff LaRe	Rep	Jeff LaRe	Rep
74	R+26.6	Bernard Willis	Rep	Bernard Willis	Rep
75	R+10.7	Haraz Ghanbari	Rep	TBD	
76	R+42.3	Marilyn John	Rep	Marilyn John	Rep
77	R+39.3	Meredith Craig	Rep	Meredith Craig	Rep
78	R+47.2	Matt Huffman	Rep	Matt Huffman	Rep
79	R+49.4	Monica Robb Blasdel	Rep	Monica Robb Blasdel	Rep
80	R+48.2	Johnathan Newman	Rep	Johnathan Newman	Rep
81	R+46.0	Jim Hoops	Rep	Patti Rockey	Rep
82	R+55.8	Roy Klopfenstein	Rep	Roy Klopfenstein	Rep
83	R+45.2	Ty Mathews	Rep	Ty Mathews	Rep
84	R+64.5	Angela King	Rep	Angela King	Rep
85	R+57.4	Tim Barhorst	Rep	Tim Barhorst	Rep
86	R+31.4	Tracy Richardson	Rep	Benjamin Weber	Rep
87	R+54.0	Riordan McClain	Rep	Jeffrey McClain	Rep
88	R+33.9	Gary Click	Rep	Gary Click	Rep
89	R+18.7	D. J. Swearingen	Rep	Caleb Stidham	Rep
90	R+54.0	Justin Pizzulli	Rep	Justin Pizzulli	Rep
91	R+57.9	Bob Peterson	Rep	Bob Peterson	Rep
92	R+42.3	Mark Johnson	Rep	Mark Johnson	Rep
93	R+54.7	Jason Stephens	Rep	Jason Stephens	Rep
94	R+39.1	Kevin Ritter	Rep	Kevin Ritter	Rep
95	R+33.7	Ty Moore	Rep	Ty Moore	Rep
96	R+45.7	Ron Ferguson	Rep	Ron Ferguson	Rep
97	R+44.8	Adam Holmes	Rep	Adam Holmes	Rep
98	R+51.1	Mark Hiner	Rep	Mark Hiner	Rep
99	R+26.3	Sarah Fowler Arthur	Rep	Sarah Fowler Arthur	Rep

== District 1 ==
=== Democratic primary ===
==== Candidates ====
===== Nominee =====
- Dontavius Jarrells, incumbent representative (2020–present)

===== Eliminated in primary =====
- Christopher Robbins

==== Results ====
Democratic primary results
Party	Candidate	Votes	%
Democratic	Dontavius Jarrells	8,739	77.30
Democratic	Christopher Robbins	2,564	22.70
Total votes		11,293	100.0

=== Republican primary ===
==== Nominee ====
- Joel Greff, computer analyst

==== Results ====
Republican primary results
Party	Candidate	Votes	%
Republican	Joel Greff	1,150	100.0
Total votes		1,150	100.0

== District 2 ==
=== Democratic primary ===
==== Nominee ====
- Charity Martin King, global humanitarian, community organizer, and educator

==== Eliminated in primary ====
- Michael Cole, former president of Columbus City Schools

==== Withdrawn ====
- Elizabeth Richards, stay-at-home mom

==== Declined ====
- Latyna Humphrey, incumbent representative (2023–present) (running for state senate)

==== Results ====
Democratic primary results
Party	Candidate	Votes	%
Democratic	Charity Martin King	6,126	66.03
Democratic	Michael Cole	3,151	33.97
Total votes		9,277	100.0

=== Libertarian primary ===
==== Declared ====
- Steve Dodge (write-in)

==== Results ====
Libertarian primary results
Party	Candidate	Votes	%
Libertarian	Steve Dodge (write-in)	6	100.0
Total votes		6	100.0

== District 3 ==
=== Democratic primary ===
==== Nominee ====
- Ismail Mohamed, incumbent representative (2023–present)

==== Results ====
Democratic primary results
Party	Candidate	Votes	%
Democratic	Ismail Mohamed	8,457	100.0
Total votes		8,457	100.0

=== Republican primary ===
==== Nominee ====
- Bernedine Kennedy Kent (write-in)

==== Results ====
Republican primary results
Party	Candidate	Votes	%
Republican	Bernedine Kennedy Kent (write-in)	161	100.0
Total votes		161	100.0

== District 4 ==
=== Democratic primary ===
==== Nominee ====
- Beryl Piccolantonio, incumbent representative (2024–present)

==== Results ====
Democratic primary results
Party	Candidate	Votes	%
Democratic	Beryl Piccolantonio	10,903	100.0
Total votes		10,093	100.0

== District 5 ==
=== Democratic primary ===
==== Nominee ====
- Meredith Lawson-Rowe, incumbent representative (2025–present)

==== Results ====
Democratic primary results
Party	Candidate	Votes	%
Democratic	Meredith Lawson-Rowe	7,734	100.0
Total votes		7,734	100.0

=== Republican primary ===
==== Nominee ====
- Richard Cole (write-in)

==== Results ====
Republican primary results
Party	Candidate	Votes	%
Republican	Richard Cole (write-in)	340	100.0
Total votes		340	100.0

== District 6 ==
=== Democratic primary ===
==== Nominee ====
- Christine Cockley, incumbent representative (2025–present)

==== Disqualified ====
- Eric Revilla

==== Results ====
Democratic primary results
Party	Candidate	Votes	%
Democratic	Christine Cockley	6,033	100.0
Total votes		6,033	100.0

=== Republican primary ===
==== Nominee ====
- Matthew Jackson

Republican primary results
Party	Candidate	Votes	%
Republican	Matthew Jackson	2,619	100.0
Total votes		2,619	100.0

=== Libertarian primary ===
==== Declared ====
- Jennifer Crayton (write-in)

==== Results ====
Libertarian primary results
Party	Candidate	Votes	%
Libertarian	Jennifer Crayton (write-in)	5	100.0
Total votes		5	100.0

== District 7 ==
=== Democratic primary ===
==== Nominee ====
- Ukeme Awakessian Jetter, mayor of Upper Arlington

==== Eliminated in primary ====
- Michaela Burriss, attorney
- Zach Rossfeld, pediatrician

==== Results ====
Democratic primary results
Party	Candidate	Votes	%
Democratic	Ukeme Awakessian Jetter	6,140	43.53
Democratic	Michaela Burriss	4,670	33.11
Democratic	Zach Rossfeld	3,294	23.36
Total votes		14,104	100.0

=== Republican primary ===
==== Nominee ====
- William Mercier

==== Results ====
Republican primary results
Party	Candidate	Votes	%
Republican	William Mercier	2,912	100.0
Total votes		2,912	100.0

== District 8 ==
=== Democratic primary ===
==== Nominee ====
- Anita Somani, incumbent representative (2023–present)

==== Results ====
Democratic primary results
Party	Candidate	Votes	%
Democratic	Anita Somani	10,440	100.0
Total votes		10,440	100.0

=== Republican primary ===
==== Nominee ====
- Kelly Hunter-Kalagidis (write-in)

==== Results ====
Republican primary results
Party	Candidate	Votes	%
Republican	Kelly Hunter-Kalagidis (write-in)	414	100.0
Total votes		414	100.0

== District 9 ==
=== Democratic primary ===
==== Nominee ====
- Munira Abdullahi, incumbent representative (2023–present)

==== Results ====
Democratic primary results
Party	Candidate	Votes	%
Democratic	Munira Abdullahi	7,446	100.0
Total votes		7,446	100.0

=== Republican primary ===
==== Declared ====
- Bruce Euans, real estate agent

==== Results ====
Republican primary results
Party	Candidate	Votes	%
Republican	Bruce Euans	2,304	100.0
Total votes		2,304	100.0

=== Libertarian primary ===
==== Declared ====
- Steven Linnabary (write-in)

==== Results ====
Libertarian primary results
Party	Candidate	Votes	%
Libertarian	Steven Linnabary (write-in)	4	100.0
Total votes		4	100.0

== District 10 ==
=== Democratic primary ===
==== Nominee ====
- Mark Sigrist, incumbent representative (2025–present)

==== Results ====
Democratic primary results
Party	Candidate	Votes	%
Democratic	Mark Sigrist	7,640	100.0
Total votes		7,640	100.0

=== Republican primary ===
==== Declared ====
- Denise D'Angelo, at-large member of the South-Western City School board

==== Results ====
Republican primary results
Party	Candidate	Votes	%
Republican	Denise D'Angelo	4,745	100.0
Total votes		4,745	100.0

== District 11 ==
=== Democratic primary ===
==== Nominee ====
- Crystal Lett, incumbent representative (2025–present)

Democratic primary results
Party	Candidate	Votes	%
Democratic	Crystal Lett	9,895	100.0
Total votes		9,895	100.0

=== Republican primary ===
==== Nominee ====
- Shawn Kaeser, teacher

Republican primary results
Party	Candidate	Votes	%
Republican	Shawn Kaeser	5,238	100.0
Total votes		5,238	100.0

== District 12 ==
=== Republican primary ===
==== Nominee ====
- Brian Stewart, incumbent representative (2023–present)

==== Eliminated in primary ====
- Patty Hamilton, Army veteran and candidate for this district in 2024

==== Results ====
Republican primary results
Party	Candidate	Votes	%
Republican	Brian Stewart	6,728	58.67
Republican	Patty Hamilton	4,740	41.33
Total votes		11,468	100.0

=== Democratic primary ===
==== Declared ====
- Liam Strasbaugh

Democratic primary results
Party	Candidate	Votes	%
Democratic	Liam Strasburg	3,205	100%
Total votes		3,205	100.0

== District 13 ==
=== Democratic primary ===
==== Declared ====
- Tristan Rader, incumbent representative (2025–present)

==== Endorsements ====
Tristan Rader

Political organizations

- Our Revolution

Political parties

- Ohio Working Families Party

Democratic primary results
Party	Candidate	Votes	%
Democratic	Tristan Rader	10,781	100%
Total votes		10,781	100.0

=== Republican primary ===
==== Declared ====
- Billy Fronimo

Republican primary results
Party	Candidate	Votes	%
Republican	Billy Fronimo	1,368	100.0
Total votes		1,368	100.0

== District 14 ==
=== Democratic primary ===
==== Declared ====
- Sean Brennan, incumbent representative (2023–present)

Democratic primary results
Party	Candidate	Votes	%
Democratic	Sean Brennan	8,510	100%
Total votes		8,510	100.0

=== Republican primary ===
==== Declared ====
- David J. Morgan, candidate for this district in 2022 and 2024 (write-in)

Republican primary results
Party	Candidate	Votes	%
Republican	David J. Morgan (write-in)	966	100.0
Total votes		966	100.0

== District 15 ==
=== Democratic primary ===
==== Declared ====
- Chris Glassburn, incumbent representative (2025–present)

Democratic primary results
Party	Candidate	Votes	%
Democratic	Chris Glassburn	8,270	100%
Total votes		8,270	100.0

=== Republican primary ===
==== Declared ====
- Daniel Conway

Republican primary results
Party	Candidate	Votes	%
Republican	Daniel Conway	4,084	100.0
Total votes		4,084	100.0

== District 16 ==
=== Democratic primary ===
==== Declared ====
- Scott DiMauro, president of the Ohio Education Association
  Democratic primary results
  Party	Candidate	Votes	%
  Democratic	Scott DiMauro	11,309	100%
  Total votes		11,309	100.0

=== Republican primary ===
==== Declared ====
- Sophia Tjotjos, attorney

Republican primary results
Party	Candidate	Votes	%
Republican	Sophia Tjotjos	4,087	100.0
Total votes		4,087	100.0

== District 17 ==
=== Republican primary ===
==== Declared ====
- Mike Dovilla, incumbent representative (2025–present)

Republican primary results
Party	Candidate	Votes	%
Republican	Mike Dovilla	7,333	100.0
Total votes		7,333	100.0

=== Democratic primary ===
==== Declared ====
- Megan Coy, at-large member of the Olmstead Falls City Council

Democratic primary results
Party	Candidate	Votes	%
Democratic	Megan Coy	9,627	100%
Total votes		9,627	100.0

== District 18 ==
=== Democratic primary ===
==== Nominee ====
- Davida Russell, former Cleveland Heights councilmember

==== Eliminated in primary ====
- Gabe Crenshaw, president of the Cleveland Heights-University Heights City School Board
- Samuel Grube, staffer for the mayor of Shaker Heights
- Peter Hoffman

==== Endorsements ====
Davida Russell

Newspapers

- The Plain Dealer

==== Results ====
Democratic primary results
Party	Candidate	Votes	%
Democratic	Davida Russell	14,066	72.76
Democratic	Gabe Crenshaw	3,505	18.13
Democratic	Samuel Grube	1,040	5.38
Democratic	Peter Hoffman	721	5.38
Total votes		19,332	100.0

=== Republican primary ===
==== Declared ====
- Maureen Lynn

Republican primary results
Party	Candidate	Votes	%
Republican	Maureen Lynn	768	100.0
Total votes		768	100.0

== District 19 ==
=== Democratic primary ===
==== Nominee ====
- Nicole Sigurdson, union organizer

==== Eliminated in primary ====
- Dionna Gore, teacher
- Cheryl Perez, small business owner
- Azaadjeet Singh, college professor (write-in)

==== Endorsements ====
Cheryl Perez

Newspapers

- The Plain Dealer

==== Results ====
Democratic primary results
Party	Candidate	Votes	%
Democratic	Nicole Sigurdson	5,962	42.34
Democratic	Dionna Gore	4,595	32.63
Democratic	Cheryl Perez	3,523	25.02
Democratic	Azaadjeet Singh (write-in)	2	0.01
Total votes		14,062	100.0

=== Republican primary ===
==== Declared ====
- Ed Hargate, pharmacist

Republican primary results
Party	Candidate	Votes	%
Republican	Ed Hargate	4,276	100.0
Total votes		4,276	100.0

== District 20 ==
=== Democratic primary ===
==== Nominee ====
- Eugene Miller, former representative from the 10th district (2007–2009)

==== Eliminated in primary ====
- Charlotte Perkins, small business owner
- Mike Seals, candidate for this district in 2022
- Lauren Welch, Cleveland city councilwoman

==== Endorsements ====
Lauren Welch

Newspapers

- The Plain Dealer

==== Results ====
Democratic primary results
Party	Candidate	Votes	%
Democratic	Eugene Miller	4,178	50.91
Democratic	Charlotte Perkins	1,810	22.05
Democratic	Lauren Welch	1,728	21.06
Democratic	Mike Seals	491	5.98
Total votes		8,207	100.0

=== Republican primary ===
==== Declared ====
- Donna Walker-Brown

Republican primary results
Party	Candidate	Votes	%
Republican	Donna Walker-Brown	390	100.0
Total votes		390	100.0

== District 21 ==
=== Democratic primary ===
==== Declared ====
- Eric Synenberg, incumbent representative (2025–present)

Democratic primary results
Party	Candidate	Votes	%
Democratic	Eric Synenberg	12,546	100%
Total votes		12,546	100.0

=== Republican primary ===
==== Declared ====
- Tina Barhams (write-in)

Republican primary results
Party	Candidate	Votes	%
Republican	Tina Barhams (write-in)	405	100.0
Total votes		405	100.0

== District 22 ==
=== Democratic primary ===
==== Nominee ====
- Darnell Brewer, incumbent representative (2023–present)

Democratic primary results
Party	Candidate	Votes	%
Democratic	Darnell Brewer	9,598	100%
Total votes		9,598	100.0

== District 23 ==
=== Democratic primary ===
==== Nominee ====
- Dan Troy, incumbent representative (2021–present)

Democratic primary results
Party	Candidate	Votes	%
Democratic	Dan Troy	1,774	100%
Total votes		1,774	100.0

=== Republican primary ===
==== Nominee ====
- Julie Belich

Republican primary results
Party	Candidate	Votes	%
Republican	Julie Belich	457	100.0
Total votes		457	100.0

=== General election ===
General election results
Party	Candidate	Votes	%
Republican	Julie Belich	-	-
Democratic	Dan Troy (incumbent)	-	-
Total votes			

== District 24 ==
=== Democratic primary ===
==== Candidates ====
- Dani Isaacsohn, incumbent representative (2023–present)

== District 25 ==
=== Democratic primary ===
==== Candidates ====
- Cecil Thomas, incumbent representative (2023–present)

== District 26 ==
=== Democratic primary ===
==== Candidates ====
===== Declared =====
- Ashley Bryant Bailey, incumbent representative (2025–present)

=== Republican primary ===
==== Candidates ====
- Tom Brinkman, former representative from the 27th district (2001–2008, 2015–2022)

== District 27 ==
=== Democratic primary ===
==== Declared ====
- Rachel Baker, incumbent representative (2025–present)

=== Republican primary ===
==== Declared ====
- Elizabeth Maier, former member of the Forest Hills Board of Education (2018–2021)

== District 28 ==
=== Democratic primary ===
==== Candidates ====
- Karen Brownlee, incumbent representative (2025–present)

=== Republican primary ===
==== Candidates ====
- Jill Cole, mayor of Blue Ash

== District 29 ==
=== Republican primary ===
==== Candidates ====
- Cindy Abrams, incumbent representative (2019–present)

=== Democratic primary ===
==== Candidates ====
- Jonathan Bradner, pastor

== District 30 ==
=== Republican primary ===
==== Candidates ====
- Mike Odioso, incumbent representative (2025–present)

=== Democratic primary ===
==== Candidates ====
- Caleb Price

== District 31 ==
=== Republican primary ===
==== Nominee ====
- Mike Kahoe, member of the Revere Local Schools Board of Education (2019–present)

==== Eliminated in primary ====
- Stephanie Stock

==== Results ====
Republican primary results
Party	Candidate	Votes	%
Republican	Mike Kahoe	5,584	65.29
Republican	Stephanie Stock	2,969	34.71
Total votes		8,553	100.0

=== Democratic primary ===
==== Candidates ====
- J. Noah Spinner, lawyer

== District 32 ==
=== Republican primary ===
==== Candidates ====
- Jack Daniels, incumbent representative (2025–present)

== District 33 ==
=== Democratic primary ===
==== Candidates ====
- Veronica Sims, incumbent representative (2024–present)

=== Republican primary ===
==== Candidates ====
- Napoleon Rodgers Jr.

== District 34 ==
=== Democratic primary ===
==== Candidates ====
- Derrick Hall, incumbent representative (2025–present)

=== Republican primary ===
==== Candidates ====
- Craig Shubert, former mayor of Hudson

== District 35 ==
=== Republican primary ===
==== Declared ====
- Vik Sandhu, small business owner

Declined

- Steve Demetriou, incumbent representative (2023–present) (running for state senate)

=== Democratic primary ===
==== Nominee ====
- Samantha Salamon, attorney

==== Eliminated in primary ====
- Molly Kudley Schneider, teacher

==== Results ====
Democratic primary results
Party	Candidate	Votes	%
Democratic	Samantha Salamon	5,958	52.07
Democratic	Molly Kudley Schneider	5,485	47.93
Total votes		11,443	100.0

== District 36 ==
=== Republican primary ===
==== Candidates ====
- Andrea White, incumbent representative (2021–present)

=== Democratic primary ===
==== Candidates ====
- Rose Lounsbury, teacher and Democratic nominee for this district in 2024

== District 37 ==
=== Republican primary ===
==== Candidates ====
- Tom Young, incumbent representative (2021–present)

=== Democratic primary ===
==== Nominee ====
- Tom Herner, corporate internal auditor, banker, entrepreneur

==== Eliminated in primary ====
- Phil Crippen, banker

==== Results ====
Democratic primary results
Party	Candidate	Votes	%
Democratic	Tom Herner	3,639	52.07
Democratic	Phil Crippen	3,463	48.76
Total votes		7,102	100.0

== District 38 ==
=== Democratic primary ===
==== Candidates ====
- Desiree Tims, incumbent representative (2025–present)

== District 39 ==
=== Republican primary ===
==== Candidates ====
- Mark Campbell, at-large city councilman for Huber Heights (1990–present)

=== Democratic primary ===
==== Candidates ====
- Daquan Neal, legislative aide
- Mike Stevens

== District 40 ==
=== Republican primary ===
==== Nominee ====
- Rodney Creech, incumbent representative (2021–present)

==== Eliminated in primary ====
- J. Todd Smith, former representative from this district (2019–2021)

==== Results ====
Republican primary results
Party	Candidate	Votes	%
Republican	Rodney Creech	6,712	58.32
Republican	J. Todd Smith	4,796	41.68
Total votes		11,508	100.0

=== Democratic primary ===
==== Candidates ====
- Timothy Hornbacker (write-in)

=== Libertarian primary ===
==== Candidates ====
- Joshua Umbaugh

== District 41 ==
=== Democratic primary ===
==== Candidates ====
- Erika White, incumbent representative (2025–present) (write-in)

=== Republican primary ===
==== Candidates ====
- Ian Chamberlin

== District 42 ==
=== Democratic primary ===
==== Candidates ====
- Elgin Rogers Jr., incumbent representative (2023–present)

== District 43 ==
=== Democratic primary ===
==== Nominee ====
- Michele Grim, incumbent representative (2023–present)

Democratic primary results
Party	Candidate	Votes	%
Democratic	Michele Grim (incumbent)	6,588	100%
Total votes		6,588	100.0

=== Republican primary ===
==== Nominee ====
- David Karmol, attorney

==== Eliminated in primary ====
- Kristi Kille

==== Results ====
Republican primary results
Party	Candidate	Votes	%
Republican	David Karmol	2,022	65.42
Republican	Kristi Kille	1,069	34.58
Total votes		3,091	100.0

=== Libertarian primary ===
==== Nominee ====
- Zach Hall, retail worker

Libertarian primary results
Party	Candidate	Votes	%
Libertarian	Zach Hall	103	100%
Total votes		103	100.0

=== General election ===
General election results
Party	Candidate	Votes	%
Republican	David Karmol	-	-
Democratic	Michele Grim (incumbent)	-	-
Libertarian	Zach Hall	-	-
Total votes			

== District 44 ==
=== Republican primary ===
==== Nominee ====
- Edward Schimmel, mayor of Northwood

==== Eliminated in primary ====
- John Rozic, attorney

==== Results ====
Republican primary results
Party	Candidate	Votes	%
Republican	Edward Schimmel	6,178	63.85
Republican	John Rozic	3,498	36.15
Total votes		9,676	100.0

=== Democratic primary ===
==== Candidates ====
- David Fournier, attorney

Democratic primary results
Party	Candidate	Votes	%
Democratic	David Fournier	8,698	100%
Total votes		8,698	100.0

=== General election ===
General election results
Party	Candidate	Votes	%
Republican	Edward Schimmel	-	-
Democratic	David Fournier	-	-
Total votes			

== District 45 ==
=== Republican primary ===
==== Candidates ====
- Jennifer Gross, incumbent representative (2023–present)

Republican primary results
Party	Candidate	Votes	%
Republican	Jennifer Gross (incumbent)	9,838	100.0
Total votes		9,838	100.0

=== Democratic primary ===
==== Candidates ====
- Jayson Rasheed

Democratic primary results
Party	Candidate	Votes	%
Democratic	Jayson Rasheed	5,695	100%
Total votes		5,695	100.0

=== General election ===
General election results
Party	Candidate	Votes	%
Republican	Jennifer Gross (incumbent)	-	-
Democratic	Jayson Rasheed	-	-
Total votes			

== District 46 ==
=== Republican primary ===
==== Candidates ====
- Thomas Hall, incumbent representative (2021–present)

Republican primary results
Party	Candidate	Votes	%
Republican	Thomas Hall (incumbent)	7,442	100.0
Total votes		7,442	100.0

=== Democratic primary ===
==== Candidates ====
- Benjamin McCaul, business consultant

Democratic primary results
Party	Candidate	Votes	%
Democratic	Benjamin McCall	4,227	100%
Total votes		4,227	100.0

=== General election ===
General election results
Party	Candidate	Votes	%
Republican	Thomas Hall (incumbent)	-	-
Democratic	Benjamin McCall	-	-
Total votes			

== District 47 ==
=== Republican primary ===
==== Candidates ====
- Diane Mullins, incumbent representative (2025–present)

Republican primary results
Party	Candidate	Votes	%
Republican	Diane Mullins (incumbent)	7,459	100.0
Total votes		7,459	100.0

=== Democratic primary ===
==== Candidates ====
- Jordan Haire, mental health counselor

Democratic primary results
Party	Candidate	Votes	%
Democratic	Jordan Haire	4,750	100%
Total votes		4,750	100.0

=== Libertarian primary ===
==== Candidates ====
- Justin Purviance

Libertarian primary results
Party	Candidate	Votes	%
Libertarian	Justin Purviance	114	100%
Total votes		114	100.0

=== General election ===
General election results
Party	Candidate	Votes	%
Republican	Diane Mullins (incumbent)	-	-
Democratic	Jordan Haire	-	-
Libertarian	Justin Purviance	-	-
Total votes			

== District 48 ==
=== Republican primary ===
==== Nominee ====
- Christina Hagan, former state representative from the 50th district (2011–2018)

==== Eliminated in primary ====
- Sue Grabowski, Lake Township trustee
- Ed Lohnes, Alliance city councilman
- Greg Wolfe, Stark County educational service center member

Declined

- Scott Oelslager, incumbent representative (2019–present) (term-limited)

==== Results ====
Republican primary results
Party	Candidate	Votes	%
Republican	Christina Hagan	6,243	47.57
Republican	Ed Lohnes	27.73	22.05
Republican	Sue Grabowski	1,704	12.98
Republican	Greg Wolfe	1,538	11.72
Total votes		13,124	100.0

=== Democratic primary ===
==== Candidates ====
- Nick Morris, university professor

Democratic primary results
Party	Candidate	Votes	%
Democratic	Nick Morris	7,670	100%
Total votes		7,670	100.0

=== General election ===
General election results
Party	Candidate	Votes	%
Republican	Christina Hagan	-	-
Democratic	Nick Morris	-	-
Total votes			

== District 49 ==
=== Republican primary ===
==== Nominee ====
- Jim Thomas, incumbent representative (2023–present)

Republican primary results
Party	Candidate	Votes	%
Republican	Jim Thomas (incumbent)	5,864	100.0
Total votes		5,864	100.0

=== Democratic primary ===
==== Nominee ====
- Krista Allison, attorney

==== Eliminated in primary ====
- Brit Steiner, diplomat

==== Results ====
Democratic primary results
Party	Candidate	Votes	%
Democratic	Krista Allison	5,087	62.25
Democratic	Brit Steiner	3,085	37.75
Total votes		8,172	100.0

=== General election ===
General election results
Party	Candidate	Votes	%
Republican	Jim Thomas (incumbent)	-	-
Democratic	Krista Allison	-	-
Total votes			

== District 50 ==
=== Republican primary ===
==== Nominee ====
- Matthew Kishman, incumbent representative (2024–present)

Republican primary results
Party	Candidate	Votes	%
Republican	Matthew Kishman (incumbent)	8,626	100.0
Total votes		8,626	100.0

=== Democratic primary ===
==== Nominee ====
- Rylan Finzer, candidate for Ohio's 6th congressional district in 2024

Democratic primary results
Party	Candidate	Votes	%
Democratic	Rylan Finzer	6,378	100%
Total votes		6,378	100.0

=== General election ===
General election results
Party	Candidate	Votes	%
Republican	Matthew Kishman (incumbent)	-	-
Democratic	Rylan Finzer	-	-
Total votes			

== District 51 ==
=== Republican primary ===
==== Nominee ====
- Jodi Salvo, incumbent representative (2024–present)

Republican primary results
Party	Candidate	Votes	%
Republican	Jodi Salvo (incumbent)	8,078	100.0
Total votes		8,078	100.0

=== Democratic primary ===
==== Nominee ====
- Amanda Fontana

==== Eliminated in primary ====
- Angie Pekarek

==== Results ====
Democratic primary results
Party	Candidate	Votes	%
Democratic	Amanda Fontana	3,633	70.15
Democratic	Angie Hall	1,546	29.85
Total votes		8,172	100.0

=== General election ===
General election results
Party	Candidate	Votes	%
Republican	Jodi Salvo (incumbent)	-	-
Democratic	Amanda Fontana	-	-
Total votes			

== District 52 ==
=== Republican primary ===
==== Nominee ====
- Cliff Winkel, North Ridgeville city councilman.

==== Withdrew after nomination ====
- Nathan Manning, state senator from the 13th district (2019–present) and son of incumbent representative Gayle Manning

Republican primary results
Party	Candidate	Votes	%
Republican	Nathan Manning	6,302	100.0
Total votes		6,302	100.0

=== Democratic primary ===
==== Nominee ====
- Mike Baker, small business owner

==== Eliminated in primary ====
- Graig Bansek, educator

==== Results ====
Democratic primary results
Party	Candidate	Votes	%
Democratic	Mike Baker	4,767	50.78
Democratic	Graig Bansek	4,620	49.22
Total votes		9,387	100.0

=== General election ===
General election results
Party	Candidate	Votes	%
Democratic	Mike Baker	28,230	54.86
Republican	Cliff Winkel	23,228	45.14
Total votes		51,548	100.0

== District 53 ==
=== Democratic primary ===
==== Nominee ====
- Matt Lundy, former representative from the 55th district (2007–2014)

==== Eliminated in primary ====
- Dan Nutt, Lorain city councilman

==== Results ====
Democratic primary results
Party	Candidate	Votes	%
Democratic	Matt Lundy	7,483	74.38
Democratic	Dan Nutt	2,577	25.62
Total votes		10,060	100.0

=== Republican primary ===
==== Candidates ====
- Bradley Lacko, nominee for this district in 2020 and 2024

Republican primary results
Party	Candidate	Votes	%
Republican	Bradley Lacko	5,442	100.0
Total votes		5,442	100.0

=== General election ===
General election results
Party	Candidate	Votes	%
Republican	Bradley Lacko	-	-
Democratic	Matt Lundy	-	-
Total votes			

== District 54 ==
=== Republican primary ===
==== Candidates ====
- Kellie Deeter, incumbent representative (2025–present)

Republican primary results
Party	Candidate	Votes	%
Republican	Kellie Deeter (incumbent)	9,041	100.0
Total votes		9,041	100.0

=== Democratic primary ===
==== Candidates ====
- Brenda Buchanan

Democratic primary results
Party	Candidate	Votes	%
Democratic	Brenda Buchanan	6,459	100%
Total votes		6,459	100.0

=== General election ===
General election results
Party	Candidate	Votes	%
Republican	Kellie Deeter (incumbent)	-	-
Democratic	Brenda Buchanan	-	-
Total votes			

== District 55 ==
=== Republican primary ===
==== Candidates ====
- Michelle Teska, incumbent representative (2025–present)

Republican primary results
Party	Candidate	Votes	%
Republican	Michelle Teska (incumbent)	11,423	100.0
Total votes		11,423	100.0

=== Democratic primary ===
==== Candidates ====
- Paul Kurtz

Democratic primary results
Party	Candidate	Votes	%
Democratic	Paul Kurtz	4,328	100%
Total votes		4,328	100.0

=== Libertarian primary ===
==== Candidates ====
- Philip Pirdy

Libertarian primary results
Party	Candidate	Votes	%
Libertarian	Philip Pirdy	127	100%
Total votes		127	100.0

=== General election ===
General election results
Party	Candidate	Votes	%
Republican	Michelle Teska (incumbent)	-	-
Democratic	Paul Kurtz	-	-
Libertarian	Philip Pirdy	-	-
Total votes			

== District 56 ==
=== Republican primary ===
==== Candidates ====
- Adam Mathews, incumbent representative (2023–present)

Republican primary results
Party	Candidate	Votes	%
Republican	Adam Mathews (incumbent)	8,351	100.0
Total votes		8,351	100.0

=== Democratic primary ===
==== Candidates ====
- Laalitya Acharya, activist

Democratic primary results
Party	Candidate	Votes	%
Democratic	Laalitya Acharya	4,837	100%
Total votes		4,837	100.0

=== General election ===
General election results
Party	Candidate	Votes	%
Republican	Adam Mathews (incumbent)	-	-
Democratic	Laalitya Acharya	-	-
Total votes			

== District 57 ==
=== Republican primary ===
==== Declared ====
- Jesse Styles, small business owner

Republican primary results
Party	Candidate	Votes	%
Republican	Jesse Styles	9,845	100.0
Total votes		9,845	100.0

=== Democratic primary ===
==== Declared ====
- Rick Walker, nominee for this district in 2024

Democratic primary results
Party	Candidate	Votes	%
Democratic	Rick Walker	6,618	100%
Total votes		6,618	100.0

=== General election ===
General election results
Party	Candidate	Votes	%
Republican	Jesse Styles	-	-
Democratic	Rick Walker	-	-
Total votes			

== District 58 ==
=== Democratic primary ===
==== Nominee ====
- John Boccieri, former representative from the 59th district (2015–2018) and United States Representative from the 16th district

==== Eliminated in primary ====
- Basia Adamczak, former Youngstown city councilwoman (2015-2023)
- Jordan Pegues, senior quotations specialist

==== Declined ====
- Lauren McNally, incumbent representative (2023–present) (running for Mahoning County commissioner

==== Results ====
Democratic primary results
Party	Candidate	Votes	%
Democratic	John Boccieri	6,548	63.79
Democratic	John Pegues	2,588	25.21
Democratic	Basia Adamczak	1,129	11.00
Total votes		10,265	100.0

=== Republican primary ===
==== Nominee ====
- Heather Fronk, nonprofit CEO

==== Results ====
Republican primary results
Party	Candidate	Votes	%
Republican	Heather Fronk	4,554	100.00

== District 59 ==
=== Republican primary ===
==== Nominee ====
- Tex Fisher, incumbent representative (2024–present)

Republican primary results
Party	Candidate	Votes	%
Republican	Tex Fisher (incumbent)	8,570	100.0
Total votes		8,570	100.0

=== Democratic primary ===
==== Nominee ====
- Wayne Penny Jr., U.S. Army veteran

Democratic primary results
Party	Candidate	Votes	%
Democratic	Wayne Penny Jr.	7,284	100%
Total votes		7,284	100.0

=== General election ===
General election results
Party	Candidate	Votes	%
Republican	Tex Fisher (incumbent)	-	-
Democratic	Wayne Penny Jr.	-	-
Total votes			

== District 60 ==
=== Republican primary ===
==== Nominee ====
- Brian Lorenz, incumbent representative (2023-present)

==== Eliminated in primary ====
- Peggy Guzzo

Republican primary results
Party	Candidate	Votes	%
Republican	Brian Lorenz	7,795	77.2
Republican	Peggy Guzzo	2,304	22.8
Total votes		10,099	100.0

=== Democratic primary ===
==== Nominee ====
- Shelby Kimball

==== Eliminated in primary ====
- Eli Wenzel

Democratic primary results
Party	Candidate	Votes	%
Democratic	Shelby Kimball	4,062	52.9
Democratic	Eli Wenzel	3,610	47.1
Total votes		7,672	100.0

=== General election ===
General election results
Party	Candidate	Votes	%
Republican	Brian Lorenz (incumbent)	-	-
Democratic	Shelby Kimball	-	-
Total votes			

== District 61 ==
=== Republican primary ===
==== Nominee ====
- Shawn Stevens, former representative from the 68th district (2022)

==== Eliminated in primary ====
- Andrew Brenner, state senator from the 19th district (2019–present) and former representative from the 67th district (2011–2018)

==== Declined ====
- Beth Lear, incumbent representative (2023–present) (unsuccessfully ran for state senate)

Republican primary results
Party	Candidate	Votes	%
Republican	Shawn Stevens	7,977	57.1
Republican	Andrew Brenner	5,994	42.9
Total votes		13,971	100.0

=== Democratic primary ===
==== Nominee ====
- Vince McGrail

Democratic primary results
Party	Candidate	Votes	%
Democratic	Vince McGrail	7,021	100%
Total votes		7,021	100.0

=== General election ===
General election results
Party	Candidate	Votes	%
Republican	Shawn Stevens	-	-
Democratic	Vince McGrail	-	-
Total votes			

== District 62 ==
=== Republican primary ===
==== Nominee ====
- Jean Schmidt, incumbent representative (2023–present)

==== Eliminated in primary ====
- Dillon Blevins, candidate for this district in 2024

Republican primary results
Party	Candidate	Votes	%
Republican	Jean Schmidt	8,559	62.5
Republican	Dillon Blevins	5,139	37.5
Total votes		11,923	100.0

=== Democratic primary ===
==== Nominee ====
- Ian Schwartz, Air Force veteran

Democratic primary results
Party	Candidate	Votes	%
Democratic	Ian Schwartz	5,058	100%
Total votes		5,058	100.0

=== Libertarian primary ===
==== Nominee ====
- Ron Grethel

Libertarian primary results
Party	Candidate	Votes	%
Libertarian	Ron Grethel	69	100%
Total votes		69	100.0

=== General election ===
General election results
Party	Candidate	Votes	%
Republican	Jean Schmidt (incumbent)	-	-
Democratic	Ian Schwartz	-	-
Libertarian	Ron Grethel	-	-
Total votes			

== District 63 ==
=== Republican primary ===
==== Declared ====
- Adam Bird, incumbent representative (2021–present)

Republican primary results
Party	Candidate	Votes	%
Republican	Adam Bird (incumbent)	11,161	100.0
Total votes		11,161	100.0

=== Democratic primary ===
==== Declared ====
- Debbie Davidson

Democratic primary results
Party	Candidate	Votes	%
Democratic	Debbie Davidson	3,253	100%
Total votes		3,253	100.0

=== General election ===
General election results
Party	Candidate	Votes	%
Republican	Adam Bird (incumbent)	-	-
Democratic	Debbie Davidson	-	-
Total votes			

== District 64 ==
=== Republican primary ===
==== Nominee ====
- Nick Santucci, incumbent representative (2023-present)

Republican primary results
Party	Candidate	Votes	%
Republican	Nick Santucci (incumbent)	6,354	100.0
Total votes		6,354	100.0

=== General election ===
General election results
Party	Candidate	Votes	%
Republican	Nick Santucci (incumbent)	-	-
Total votes			

== District 65 ==
=== Republican primary ===
==== Nominee ====
- David Thomas, incumbent representative (2025-present)

Republican primary results
Party	Candidate	Votes	%
Republican	David Thomas (incumbent)	8,920	100.0
Total votes		8,920	100.0

=== Democratic primary ===
==== Nominee ====
- ~~Lorna Westlake~~ (withdrawn)
- John Barbo (appointed)

Democratic primary results
Party	Candidate	Votes	%
Democratic	Lorna Westlake	6,778	100%
Total votes		6,778	100.0

=== General election ===
General election results
Party	Candidate	Votes	%
Republican	David Thomas (incumbent)	-	-
Democratic	John Barbo	-	-
Total votes			

== District 66 ==
=== Republican primary ===
==== Nominee ====
- Sean Hutson, attorney

==== Eliminated in primary ====
- Aidan Haggard, college student

==== Declined ====
- Sharon Ray, incumbent representative (2023-2026)

Republican primary results
Party	Candidate	Votes	%
Republican	Sean Hutson	8,172	68.5
Republican	Aidan Haggard	3,751	31.5
Total votes		11,923	100.0

=== Democratic primary ===
==== Nominee ====
- Chris Nardo

Democratic primary results
Party	Candidate	Votes	%
Democratic	Chris Nardo	7,024	100%
Total votes		7,024	100.0

=== Libertarian primary ===
==== Nominee ====
- Justin Peroli

Libertarian primary results
Party	Candidate	Votes	%
Libertarian	Justin Peroli	96	100%
Total votes		96	100.0

=== General election ===
General election results
Party	Candidate	Votes	%
Republican	Sean Hutson	-	-
Democratic	Heather Sample	-	-
Libertarian	Justin Peroli	-	-
Total votes			

== District 67 ==
=== Republican primary ===
==== Nominee ====
- Melanie Miller, incumbent representative (2023-present)

Republican primary results
Party	Candidate	Votes	%
Republican	Melanie Miller (incumbent)	9,513	100.0
Total votes		9,513	100.0

=== Democratic primary ===
==== Nominee ====
- Heather Sample

Democratic primary results
Party	Candidate	Votes	%
Democratic	Heather Sample	4,847	100%
Total votes		4,847	100.0

=== General election ===
General election results
Party	Candidate	Votes	%
Republican	Melanie Miller (incumbent)	-	-
Democratic	Heather Sample	-	-
Total votes			

== District 68 ==
=== Republican primary ===
==== Nominee ====
- Thaddeus Claggett, incumbent representative (2023-present)

Republican primary results
Party	Candidate	Votes	%
Republican	Thaddeus Claggett (incumbent)	8,676	100.0
Total votes		8,676	100.0

=== Democratic primary ===
==== Nominee ====
- Mason Blankenship

Democratic primary results
Party	Candidate	Votes	%
Democratic	Mason Blankenship	6,245	100%
Total votes		6,245	100.0

=== General election ===
General election results
Party	Candidate	Votes	%
Republican	Thaddeus Claggett (incumbent)	-	-
Democratic	Mason Blankenship	-	-
Total votes			

== District 69 ==
=== Republican Primary ===
==== Nominee ====
- Kevin D. Miller, incumbent representative (2023-present)

Republican primary results
Party	Candidate	Votes	%
Republican	Kevin D. Miller (incumbent)	10,232	100.0
Total votes		10,232	100.0

=== Democratic primary ===
==== Nominee ====
- Amy Rigsby

Democratic primary results
Party	Candidate	Votes	%
Democratic	Amy Rigsby	3,777	100%
Total votes		3,777	100.0

=== General election ===
General election results
Party	Candidate	Votes	%
Republican	Kevin D. Miller (incumbent)	-	-
Democratic	Amy Rigsby	-	-
Total votes			

== District 70 ==
=== Republican primary ===
==== Nominee ====
- Brian Lampton, incumbent representative (2021-present)

==== Eliminated in primary ====
- Terry Dale Free

Republican primary results
Party	Candidate	Votes	%
Republican	Brian Lampton (incumbent)	9,022	82.3
Republican	Terry Dale Free	1,937	17.7
Total votes		10,959	100.0

=== Democratic primary ===
==== Nominee ====
- Kim McCarthy

Democratic primary results
Party	Candidate	Votes	%
Democratic	Kim McCarthy	6,117	100%
Total votes		6,117	100.0

=== General election ===
General election results
Party	Candidate	Votes	%
Republican	Brian Lampton (incumbent)	-	-
Democratic	Kim McCarthy	-	-
Total votes			

== District 71 ==
=== Republican primary ===
==== Nominee ====
- Levi Dean, incumbent representative (2025-present)

Republican primary results
Party	Candidate	Votes	%
Republican	Levi Dean (incumbent)	10,363	100.0
Total votes		10,363	100.0

=== Democratic primary ===
==== Nominee ====
- Krista Magaw

Democratic primary results
Party	Candidate	Votes	%
Democratic	Krista Magaw	4,649	100%
Total votes		4,649	100.0

=== General election ===
General election results
Party	Candidate	Votes	%
Republican	Levi Dean (incumbent)	-	-
Democratic	Krista Magaw	-	-
Total votes			

== District 72 ==
=== Republican primary ===
==== Nominee ====
- Heidi Workman, incumbent representative (2025–present)

Republican primary results
Party	Candidate	Votes	%
Republican	Heidi Workman (incumbent)	7,179	100.0
Total votes		7,179	100.0

=== Democratic primary ===
==== Nominee ====
- Jeff Clapper, Kent city councilman

Democratic primary results
Party	Candidate	Votes	%
Democratic	Jeff Clapper	7,739	100%
Total votes		7,739	100.0

=== Libertarian primary ===
==== Nominee ====
- Michael Fricke

Libertarian primary results
Party	Candidate	Votes	%
Libertarian	Michael Frike	84	100%
Total votes		84	100.0

=== General election ===
General election results
Party	Candidate	Votes	%
Republican	Heidi Workman (incumbent)	-	-
Democratic	Jeff Clapper	-	-
Libertarian	Michael Frike	-	-
Total votes			

== District 73 ==
=== Republican primary ===
==== Nominee ====
- Jeff LaRe, incumbent representative (2019-present)

Republican primary results
Party	Candidate	Votes	%
Republican	Jeff LaRe	9,894	100.0
Total votes		9,894	100.0

=== Democratic primary ===
==== Nominee ====
- Whittney Wood

==== Eliminated in primary ====
- Andrew Foltz

Democratic primary results
Party	Candidate	Votes	%
Democratic	Whittney Wood	4,678	66.6
Democratic	Andrew Foltz	2,347	33.4
Total votes		7,025	100.0

=== General election ===
General election results
Party	Candidate	Votes	%
Republican	Jeff LaRe (incumbent)	-	-
Democratic	Whittney Wood	-	-
Total votes			

== District 74 ==
=== Republican primary ===
==== Nominee ====
- Bernard Willis, incumbent representative (2023-present)

Republican primary results
Party	Candidate	Votes	%
Republican	Bernard Willis (incumbent)	7,299	100.0
Total votes		7,299	100.0

=== Democratic primary ===
==== Nominee ====
- Darrell Jackson

Democratic primary results
Party	Candidate	Votes	%
Democratic	Darrell Jackson	4,924	100%
Total votes		4,924	100.0

=== General election ===
General election results
Party	Candidate	Votes	%
Republican	Bernard Willis (incumbent)	-	-
Democratic	Darrell Jackson	-	-
Total votes			

== District 75 ==
=== Republican primary ===
==== Nominee ====
- Haraz Ghanbari, incumbent representative (2023-present)

Republican primary results
Party	Candidate	Votes	%
Republican	Haraz Ghanbari (incumbent)	6,590	100.0
Total votes		6,590	100.0

=== Democratic primary ===
==== Nominee ====
- Jake Kielmeyer

Democratic primary results
Party	Candidate	Votes	%
Democratic	Jake Kielmeyer	5,810	100%
Total votes		5,810	100.0

=== General election ===
General election results
Party	Candidate	Votes	%
Republican	Haraz Ghanbari (incumbent)	-	-
Democratic	Jake Kielmeyer	-	-
Total votes			

== District 76 ==
=== Republican primary ===
==== Nominee ====
- Marilyn John, incumbent representative (2021-present)

Republican primary results
Party	Candidate	Votes	%
Republican	Marilyn John (incumbent)	12,765	100.0
Total votes		12,765	100.0

=== Democratic primary ===
==== Nominee ====
- Colton Stidam

Democratic primary results
Party	Candidate	Votes	%
Democratic	Colton Stidam	5,119	100%
Total votes		5,119	100.0

=== General election ===
General election results
Party	Candidate	Votes	%
Republican	Marilyn John (incumbent)	-	-
Democratic	Colton Stidam	-	-
Total votes			

== District 77 ==
=== Republican primary ===
==== Nominee ====
- Meredith Craig, incumbent representative (2024-present)

Republican primary results
Party	Candidate	Votes	%
Republican	Meredith Craig (incumbent)	7,966	100.0
Total votes		7,966	100.0

=== Democratic primary ===
==== Nominee ====
- Brooke Dillon

Democratic primary results
Party	Candidate	Votes	%
Democratic	Brooke Dillon	4,243	100%
Total votes		4,243	100.0

=== General election ===
General election results
Party	Candidate	Votes	%
Republican	Meredith Craig (incumbent)	-	-
Democratic	Brooke Dillon	-	-
Total votes			

== District 78 ==
=== Republican primary ===
==== Nominee ====
- Matt Huffman, incumbent representative (2025-present) and Speaker of the House (2025-present)

Republican primary results
Party	Candidate	Votes	%
Republican	Matt Huffman (incumbent)	8,945	100.0
Total votes		8,945	100.0

=== Democratic primary ===
==== Nominee ====
- Jeffrey Givan

Democratic primary results
Party	Candidate	Votes	%
Democratic	Jeffrey Givan	2,994	100%
Total votes		2,994	100.0

=== General election ===
General election results
Party	Candidate	Votes	%
Republican	Matt Huffman (incumbent)	-	-
Democratic	Jeffrey Givan	-	-
Total votes			

== District 79 ==
=== Republican primary ===
==== Nominee ====
- Monica Robb Blasdel, incumbent representative (2023-present)

Republican primary results
Party	Candidate	Votes	%
Republican	Monica Robb Blasdel (incumbent)	8,932	100.0
Total votes		8,932	100.0

=== Democratic primary ===
==== Nominee ====
- Bob Guy

Democratic primary results
Party	Candidate	Votes	%
Democratic	Bob Guy	3,778	100%
Total votes		3,778	100.0

==== Endorsements ====
Bob Guy

Labor unions

- Ohio Federation of Teachers

=== General election ===
General election results
Party	Candidate	Votes	%
Republican	Monica Robb Blasdel (incumbent)	-	-
Democratic	Bob Guy	-	-
Total votes			

== District 80 ==
=== Republican primary ===
==== Nominee ====
- Johnathan Newman, incumbent representative (2025-present)

Republican primary results
Party	Candidate	Votes	%
Republican	Johnathan Newman	10,807	100.0
Total votes		10,807	100.0

=== Democratic primary ===
==== Nominee ====
- Melissa VanDyke
- Katie Wagner

Democratic primary results
Party	Candidate	Votes	%
Democratic	Katie Wagner	3,096	70.6
Democratic	Melissa VanDyke	1,286	29.4
Total votes		4,382	100.0

=== General election ===
General election results
Party	Candidate	Votes	%
Republican	Johnathan Newman (incumbent)	-	-
Democratic	Katie Wagner	-	-
Total votes			

== District 81 ==
=== Republican primary ===
==== Nominee ====
- Patti Rockey, Williams County recorder

==== Eliminated in primary ====
- Brandon Moskwa, small business owner

Declined

- Jim Hoops, incumbent representative (2018-present) (term-limited)

Republican primary results
Party	Candidate	Votes	%
Republican	Patti Rockey	9,220	71.0
Republican	Brandon Moskwa	3,764	29.0
Total votes		12,984	100.0

=== Democratic primary ===
==== Nominee ====
- David Swanson

Democratic primary results
Party	Candidate	Votes	%
Democratic	David Swanson	3,558	100%
Total votes		3,558	100.0

=== General election ===
General election results
Party	Candidate	Votes	%
Republican	Patti Rockey	-	-
Democratic	David Swanson	-	-
Total votes			

== District 82 ==
=== Republican primary ===
==== Nominee ====
- Roy Klopfenstein, incumbent representative (2023-present)

Republican primary results
Party	Candidate	Votes	%
Republican	Roy Klopfenstein (incumbent)	14,221	100
Total votes		14,221	100.0

=== Democratic primary ===
==== Nominee ====
- Maddux McCray (write-in)

Democratic primary results
Party	Candidate	Votes	%
Democratic	Maddux McCray (write-in)	268	100%
Total votes		268	100.0

=== Libertarian primary ===
==== Nominee ====
- Christopher Elder

Libertarian primary results
Party	Candidate	Votes	%
Libertarian	Christopher Elder	98	100%
Total votes		98	100.0

=== General election ===
General election results
Party	Candidate	Votes	%
Republican	Roy Klopfenstein (incumbent)	-	-
Democratic	Maddux McCray	-	-
Libertarian	Christopher Elder	-	-
Total votes			

== District 83 ==
=== Republican primary ===
==== Nominee ====
- Ty Mathews, incumbent representative (2025-present)

Republican primary results
Party	Candidate	Votes	%
Republican	Ty Mathews	11,902	100.0
Total votes		11,902	100.0

=== Democratic primary ===
==== Nominee ====
- Sheila Coressel

Democratic primary results
Party	Candidate	Votes	%
Democratic	Sheila Coressel	3,275	100%
Total votes		3,275	100.0

=== General election ===
General election results
Party	Candidate	Votes	%
Republican	Ty Mathews	-	-
Democratic	Sheila Coressel	-	-
Total votes			

== District 84 ==
=== Republican primary ===
==== Nominee ====
- Angela King, incumbent representative (2023-present)

Republican primary results
Party	Candidate	Votes	%
Republican	Angela King	10,533	100.0
Total votes		10,533	100.0

=== Democratic primary ===
==== Nominee ====
- Arienne Childrey

Democratic primary results
Party	Candidate	Votes	%
Democratic	Arienne Childrey	2,177	100%
Total votes		2,177	100.0

=== General election ===
General election results
Party	Candidate	Votes	%
Republican	Angela King	-	-
Democratic	Adrienne Childrey	-	-
Total votes			

== District 85 ==
=== Republican primary ===
==== Nominee ====
- Tim Barhorst, incumbent representative (2023-present)

Republican primary results
Party	Candidate	Votes	%
Republican	Tim Barhorst	11,077	100.0
Total votes		11,077	100.0

=== Democratic primary ===
==== Nominee ====
- Victoria Maddox, factory worker

==== Eliminated in primary ====
- Pamela Grogean, community advocate
- John Newlin II

Democratic primary results
Party	Candidate	Votes	%
Democratic	Victoria Maddox	1,272	41.0
Democratic	Pamela Grogean	1,188	38.3
Democratic	John Newlin II	640	20.7
Total votes		3,100	100.0

=== General election ===
General election results
Party	Candidate	Votes	%
Republican	Tim Barhorst	-	-
Democratic	Victoria Maddox	-	-
Total votes			

== District 86 ==
=== Republican primary ===
==== Nominee ====
- Benjamin Weber, attorney

==== Eliminated in primary ====
- Wezlynn Davis, Jerome Township Trustee
- Steven Wolfe, Marysville city councilman (2023-present)

Republican primary results
Party	Candidate	Votes	%
Republican	Benjamin Weber	5,409	45.1
Republican	Wezlynn Davis	3,761	31.3
Republican	Steven Wolfe	2,832	23.6
Total votes		12,002	100.0

=== Democratic primary ===
==== Nominee ====
- Kent Halloran

Democratic primary results
Party	Candidate	Votes	%
Democratic	Kent Halloran	4,243	100%
Total votes		4,243	100.0

=== General election ===
General election results
Party	Candidate	Votes	%
Republican	Benjamin Weber	-	-
Democratic	Kent Halloran	-	-
Total votes			

== District 87 ==
=== Republican primary ===
==== Nominee ====
- Jeffrey McClain, former representative (2009-2016)

Republican primary results
Party	Candidate	Votes	%
Republican	Jeffrey McClain	10,640	100.0
Total votes		10,640	100.0

=== Democratic primary ===
==== Nominee ====
- Lora Covrett (write-in)

Democratic primary results
Party	Candidate	Votes	%
Democratic	Lora Covrett (write-in)	189	100%
Total votes		189	100.0

=== General election ===
General election results
Party	Candidate	Votes	%
Republican	Jeffrey McClain	-	-
Democratic	Lora Covrett	-	-
Total votes			

== District 88 ==
=== Republican primary ===
==== Nominee ====
- Gary Click, incumbent representative (2021–present)

==== Eliminated in primary ====
- Eric Watson

Republican primary results
Party	Candidate	Votes	%
Republican	Gary Click (incumbent)	6,859	52.3
Republican	Eric Watson	6,260	47.7
Total votes		13,119	100.0

=== Democratic primary ===
==== Nominee ====
- Aaron Jones

Democratic primary results
Party	Candidate	Votes	%
Democratic	Aaron Jones	4,893	100%
Total votes		4,893	100.0

=== Libertarian primary ===
==== Nominee ====
- Benjamin Machoukas (write-in)

Libertarian primary results
Party	Candidate	Votes	%
Libertarian	Benjamin Machoukas (write-in)	17	100%
Total votes		17	100.0

=== General election ===
General election results
Party	Candidate	Votes	%
Republican	Gary Click (incumbent)	-	-
Democratic	Easton Retzke	-	-
Libertarian	Benjamin Machoukas	-	-
Total votes			

== District 89 ==
=== Republican primary ===
==== Nominee ====
- D.J. Swearingen, incumbent representative (2019–present)

Republican primary results
Party	Candidate	Votes	%
Republican	D. J. Swearingen (incumbent)	8,238	100.0
Total votes		8,238	100.0

=== Democratic primary ===
==== Nominee ====
- Easton Retzke, entrepreneur

Withdrawn

- Sam Artino, Huron city councilman and former mayor of Huron

Democratic primary results
Party	Candidate	Votes	%
Democratic	Easton Retzke	6,248	100%
Total votes		6,248	100.0

=== General election ===
General election results
Party	Candidate	Votes	%
Republican	D. J. Swearingen (incumbent)	-	-
Democratic	Easton Retzke	-	-
Total votes			

== District 90 ==
=== Nominee ===
- Justin Pizzuli, incumbent representative (2023–present)

Republican primary results
Party	Candidate	Votes	%
Republican	Justin Pizzuli (incumbent)	9,964	100.0
Total votes		9,964	100.0

=== Democratic primary ===
==== Nominee ====
- Collin Docterman

Democratic primary results
Party	Candidate	Votes	%
Democratic	Collin Docterman	3,206	100%
Total votes		3,206	100.0

=== General election ===
General election results
Party	Candidate	Votes	%
Republican	Justin Pizzuli (incumbent)	-	-
Democratic	Collin Docterman	-	-
Total votes			

== District 91 ==
=== Republican primary ===
==== Nominee ====
- Bob Peterson, incumbent representative (2023–present)

Republican primary results
Party	Candidate	Votes	%
Republican	Bob Peterson (incumbent)	8,716	100.0
Total votes		8,716	100.0

=== Democratic primary ===
==== Nominee ====
- Amy Wright

Democratic primary results
Party	Candidate	Votes	%
Democratic	Amy Wright	2,558	100%
Total votes		2,558	100.0

=== General election ===
General election results
Party	Candidate	Votes	%
Republican	Bob Peterson (incumbent)	-	-
Democratic	Amy Wright	-	-
Total votes			

== District 92 ==
=== Republican primary ===
==== Nominee ====
- Mark Johnson, incumbent representative (2021–present)

Republican primary results
Party	Candidate	Votes	%
Republican	Mark Johnson (incumbent)	7,053	100.0
Total votes		7,053	100.0

=== Democratic primary ===
Nominee

- Sarah Seniff (write-in)

Democratic primary results
Party	Candidate	Votes	%
Democratic	Sarah Seniff (write-in)	483	100%
Total votes		483	100.0

=== General election ===
General election results
Party	Candidate	Votes	%
Republican	Mark Johnson (incumbent)	-	-
Democratic	Sarah Seniff	-	-
Total votes			

== District 93 ==
=== Republican primary ===
==== Nominee ====
- Jason Stephens, incumbent representative (2019–present) and former speaker of the Ohio House (2023–2025)

==== Eliminated in primary ====
- Larry Kidd, small business owner and candidate for Ohio's 2nd Congressional District in 2024
Jason Stephens

Party chapters

- Lawrence County Republican Party

Republican primary results
Party	Candidate	Votes	%
Republican	Jason Stephens (incumbent)	7,210	62.6%
Republican	Larry Kidd	4,303	37.4%
Total votes		11,513	100.0

=== Democratic primary ===
Nominee

- Jessica Harper, teacher

Democratic primary results
Party	Candidate	Votes	%
Democratic	Jessica Harper	2,885	100%
Total votes		2,885	100.0

=== General election ===
General election results
Party	Candidate	Votes	%
Republican	Jason Stephens (incumbent)	25.332	70.07
Democratic	Jessica Harper	10,822	29.93
Total votes		36,154	100%

== District 94 ==
=== Republican primary ===
==== Nominee ====
- Kevin Ritter, incumbent representative (2025–present)

Republican primary results
Party	Candidate	Votes	%
Republican	Kevin Ritter (incumbent)	10,072	100.0
Total votes		10,072	100.0

=== Democratic primary ===
Nominee

- Wenda Sheard, nominee for this district in 2024

Democratic primary results
Party	Candidate	Votes	%
Democratic	Wenda Sheard	5,236	100%
Total votes		5,236	100.0

=== General election ===
General election results
Party	Candidate	Votes	%
Republican	Kevin Ritter (incumbent)	25,078	60.87
Democratic	Wenda Sheard	16,119	39.13
Total votes		41,197	100%

== District 95 ==
=== Republican primary ===
==== Nominee ====
- Ty Moore, incumbent representative (2025–present)

Republican primary results
Party	Candidate	Votes	%
Republican	Ty Moore (incumbent)	7,553	100.0
Total votes		7,553	100.0

=== Democratic primary ===
Nominee

- Paul Cameron

==== Eliminated in primary ====
- James Joyce

Democratic primary results
Party	Candidate	Votes	%
Democratic	Paul Cameron	3,025	64.8%
Democratic	James Joyce	1,644	35.2%
Total votes		4,669	100.0

=== General election ===
General election results
Party	Candidate	Votes	%
Republican	Ty Moore (incumbent)	22,414	60.27
Democratic	Paul Cameron	14,778	39.73
Total votes		37,192	100%

== District 96 ==
=== Republican primary ===
==== Nominee ====
- Ron Ferguson, incumbent representative (2021–present)

==== Eliminated in primary ====
- Frank Hoagland, former state senator from the 30th District (2017–2023)

Republican primary results
Party	Candidate	Votes	%
Republican	Ron Ferguson (incumbent)	7,003	62.7%
Republican	Frank Hoagland	4,165	37.3%
Total votes		11,168	100.0

=== Democratic primary ===
==== Nominee ====
- Charrie Foglio

Democratic primary results
Party	Candidate	Votes	%
Democratic	Charrie Foglio	4,351	100%
Total votes		4,351	100.0

=== General election ===
General election results
Party	Candidate	Votes	%
Republican	Ron Ferguson (incumbent)	24,985	65.81
Democratic	Charrie Foglio	12,981	34.19
Total votes		37,966	100%

== District 97 ==
=== Republican primary ===
==== Nominee ====
- Adam Holmes, incumbent representative (2019–present)

Republican primary results
Party	Candidate	Votes	%
Republican	Adam Holmes (incumbent)	6,372	100.0
Total votes		6,372	100.0

=== Libertarian primary ===
==== Nominee ====
- Tim Godwin

Libertarian primary results
Party	Candidate	Votes	%
Libertarian	Tim Godwin	48	100.0
Total votes		48	100.0

=== General election ===
General election results
Party	Candidate	Votes	%
Republican	Adam Holmes (incumbent)	24,818	69.19
Libertarian	Tim Godwin	4,514	12.58
Write-in	Kris Geis (Write-in)	6,538	18.23
Total votes		35,870	100%

== District 98 ==
=== Republican primary ===
==== Nominee ====
- Mark Hiner, incumbent representative (2024–present)

Republican primary results
Party	Candidate	Votes	%
Republican	Mark Hiner (incumbent)	9,334	100.0
Total votes		9,334	100.0

=== Democratic primary ===
==== Nominee ====
- Scott Grund

Democratic primary results
Party	Candidate	Votes	%
Democratic	Scott Grund	3,092	100%
Total votes		3,092	100.0

=== General election ===
General election results
Party	Candidate	Votes	%
Republican	Mark Hiner (incumbent)	25.155	70.98
Democratic	Scott Grund	10,283	29.02
Total votes		35,438	100%

== District 99 ==
=== Republican primary ===
==== Nominee ====
- Sarah Fowler Arthur, incumbent representative (2021–present)

Republican primary results
Party	Candidate	Votes	%
Republican	Sarah Fowler Arthur (incumbent)	10,612	100.0
Total votes		10,612	100.0

=== Democratic primary ===
==== Nominee ====
- Louis Murphy, nominee for this district in 2024
- Michael F. Price

Democratic primary results
Party	Candidate	Votes	%
Democratic	Louis Murphy	3,591	57.1%
Democratic	Michael F. Price	2,701	42.9%
Total votes		6,292	100.0

=== General election ===
General election results
Party	Candidate	Votes	%
Republican	Sarah Fowler Arthur (incumbent)	28,521	58.51
Democratic	Louis Murphy	20,227	41.49
Total votes		48,748	100%
