= Scott DiMauro =

American politician

Member-elect of the Ohio House of Representatives from the 16th district
- Assuming office January 1, 2027
- Succeeding: Bride Rose Sweeney

Personal details
- Party: Democratic
- Education: Miami University; Ohio State University
- Website: Official website

Scott DiMauro is an American politician who is the member-elect for the 16th district of the Ohio House of Representatives. He was elected in the 2026 election and will succeed to the office on January 1, 2027. He was president of the Ohio Education Association. He was a high school social studies teacher in Worthington, Ohio.
