= Michael Baker =

Michael Baker may refer to:

- Michael Baker (politician) (1957–2009), Canadian politician
- Mike Baker (Ohio politician), American politician
- Michael A. Baker (born 1953), NASA astronaut
- Michael Baker (American football) (born 1970), American football player
- Michael Baker (physician) (born 1943), Canadian cancer researcher
- Michael Baker (epidemiologist), New Zealand epidemiologist
- Michael Conway Baker (born 1937), Canadian composer
- Mickey Baker (1925–2012), American guitarist
- Mike Baker (singer) (1963–2008), lead vocalist for the American progressive metal band Shadow Gallery
- Mike Baker (journalist) (1957–2012), BBC broadcaster
- Mike Baker (CIA officer) (born 1961), American-British former officer with the Central Intelligence Agency
- Mike Baker, the full name of Thatcher (Rainbow Six Siege), a fictional character from Tom Clancy's Rainbow Six Siege by Ubisoft
