= Shelby Kimball =

American politician (born 1991/1992)

Member-elect of the Ohio House of Representatives from the 60th district
- Assuming office January 4, 2027
- Succeeding: Brian Lorenz

Personal details
- Born: 1991 or 1992 (age 34–35)
- Party: Democratic
- Children: 4
- Education: Ohio State University
- Website: Campaign website

Military service
- Branches: United States Marine Corps; United States Army

Shelby Kimball (born 1991/1992) is an American politician who is the member-elect for the 60th district of the Ohio House of Representatives, and will take office in 2027. She was elected in the 2026 election, unseating incumbent Republican Brian Lorenz. She is a veteran of the United States Marine Corps and United States Army. She is the mother of four children.
