= Ukeme =

- Gender: Unisex

Origin
- Language: Ibibio Efik
- Origin: Nigerian
- Meaning: Ability
- Region of origin: South-south Nigeria

Other names
- Derivative: UK

Ukeme is a Nigerian unisex name from the Ibibio and Efik origin which means ''Ability''.

== Notable people with the name ==
- Ukeme Awakessian Jetter, Nigerian-born American politician
- Ukeme Eligwe (born 1994), Nigerian-American former professional football player

== See also ==
- Ukemi
