= Samantha Salamon =

American politician

Member-elect of the Ohio House of Representatives from the 35th district
- Assuming office January 1, 2027
- Succeeding: Steve Demetriou

Personal details
- Party: Democratic
- Education: Walsh Jesuit High School; Cleveland State University
- Website: Official website

Samantha Salamon is an American politician who is the member-elect for the 35th district of the Ohio House of Representatives, succeeding to the office on January 1, 2027. She was elected in the 2026 election. She is a victims' rights and non-profit attorney from Northfield Center.
