= Don Jones (Ohio politician) =

American politician

Member of the Ohio House of Representatives from the 95th district
- In office January 6, 2019 – June 1, 2025
- Preceded by: Andy Thompson
- Succeeded by: Ty Moore

Personal details
- Born: Cadiz, Ohio, US
- Party: Republican
- Spouse: Amy Jones
- Education: Ashland University

Donald Jones is a Republican former member of the Ohio House of Representatives, representing the 95th district from 2019 to 2025. Jones's district included all of Carroll, Harrison, and Noble counties and portions of Belmont and Washington counties. Prior to elected office, Jones served as an agricultural education teacher at Harrison Central High School. He also serves as a volunteer firefighter and EMT.

Former State Representative Andy Thompson's term expired at the end of 2018. Thompson had served 8 years in the Ohio House and was term limited per the Ohio Constitution causing an open seat in the 95th district. Unopposed in the Republican primary, Jones went on to win the seat with more than 65% of the vote. He was sworn into office for the first time on January 6, 2019.

In 2021, Jones sponsored legislation to ban the teaching that any individual is “inherently racist,” that any individual “bears responsibility for actions committed in the past by the same race or sex,” or that slavery “constitutes the true founding” of the United States. Jones argued, "Critical race theory is a dangerous and flat-out wrong theory." Asked if any Ohio schools actually teach the things that Jones sought to ban, Jones could not cite any examples.

== FirstEnergy scandal ==
Rep. Don Jones supported House Bill 6 (HB 6), which was later at the center of the FirstEnergy bribery and racketeering scandal. See Ohio nuclear bribery scandal.

Campaign finance reports show that Jones received $3,000 from the FirstEnergy political action committee in 2019.

Jones was not charged in the federal bribery case. However, their support for HB 6 and campaign contributions from FirstEnergy drew scrutiny from watchdog organizations and media outlets, which pointed to the utility’s extensive financial influence in Ohio politics.

== Resignation ==
On June 1, 2025, Jones resigned from the Ohio House after accepting an appointment from President Donald Trump to serve as the State Executive Director of the Ohio Farm Service Agency within the U.S. Department of Agriculture. He began his new role on June 2, 2025.

== Links ==
- Representative Don Jones (official site)
