= Davida Russell =

American politician

- Russell in 2008

Member-elect of the Ohio House of Representatives from the 18th district
- Assuming office January 1, 2027
- Succeeding: Juanita Brent

Personal details
- Born: 1958 or 1959 (age 66–67)
- Party: Democratic
- Education: National Labor College (BA)

Davida Russell is an American politician and labor organizer who is a member-elect of the Ohio House of Representatives for the 18th district. She previously served on the Cleveland Heights city council from 2019 until 2025.

== Early life and career ==
Russell's family moved to Cleveland Heights after experiencing racism in Collinwood. Her mother helped found the Ohio Association of Public School Employees Local 744. Russell earned a Bachelor of Arts from the National Labor College in 2007.

She works as a substitute teacher and school bus driver at South Euclid-Lyndhurst City School District. She is also the state president of the Coalition of Labor Union Women and vice president of the Ohio AFL-CIO. In January 2021, Russell served as a member of the Biden-Harris Transition committee.

== Political career ==
=== Cleveland Heights City Council ===
Russell and the rest of the council unanimously voted to designate Cleveland Heights "safe haven" for transgender people seeking gender-affirming care in November 2024.

In 2025, Russell ran for mayor of the city following the recall of incumbent Kahlil Seren. By late October, Russell had outraised fellow city councilmember Jim Petras by over $30,000, primarily from labor union donations. She was defeated by Petras in the November 2025 election.

=== Ohio House of Representatives ===
In December 2025, Russell announced her campaign for the 18th district of the Ohio House of Representatives in the 2026 election. Incumbent Democrat Juanita Brent was term-limited and unsuccessfully ran for the Cleveland City Council in 2025. Russell won the Democratic primary election with 72.8% of the vote.
