= Steve Reinhard =

American farmer, teacher, and politician

Member of the Ohio House of Representatives from the 82nd district
- In office January 3, 2001 – December 31, 2008
- Preceded by: Randy Weston
- Succeeded by: Jeffrey McClain

Personal details
- Born: September 12, 1967 (age 58) Bucyrus, Ohio
- Party: Republican
- Profession: farmer, teacher

Steve Reinhard is an American farmer, teacher, and politician.

Born in Bucyrus, Ohio, Reinhard graduated from Ohio State University with a degree in agriculture education and economics. Reinhard was teacher and farmer. From 2001 to 2008, Reinhard served in the Ohio House of Representatives and is a Republican.

Reinhard taught agriculture at Crestview High School and coached basketball. In 2012, Reinhard served as Crawford County commissioner. He also served on the Ohio Exposition Commission and is the chairman of the commission. In 2016, Reinhard sought election to the Ohio House of Representatives, but was defeated in the primary by Wes Goodman.

With Senator Karen Gillmor resigning from her seat, in 2011, Reinhard was named as a possible successor.

== See also ==
- Ohio House of Representatives
