= Nicole Sigurdson =

American politician

Member-elect of the Ohio House of Representatives from the 19th district
- Assuming office January 1, 2027
- Succeeding: Phil Robinson

Personal details
- Born: 1994 (age 31–32)
- Party: Democratic
- Education: Ohio State University
- Website: Official website

Nicole Sigurdson (born 1994) (Note: Source states that she was 32 in April 2026) is an American politician who is the member-elect for the 19th district of the Ohio House of Representatives, succeeding to the office on January 1, 2027. She was elected in the 2026 election. She is an organizer with SEIU 1199.
