= Sean Hutson =

American politician

Member of the Ohio House of Representatives from the 66th district
- Incumbent
- Assumed office September 30, 2026
- Preceded by: Sharon Ray

Personal details
- Party: Republican

Sean Hutson is an American politician who has served in the Ohio House of Representatives for the 66th district since 2026. He is a Republican. He is a candidate for a full term in the 2026 election.
