= Randy Weston (politician) =

American politician (born 1958)

Member of the Ohio House of Representatives from the 90th district
- In office January 3, 1991 – March 1, 1999
- Preceded by: Larry Adams
- Succeeded by: Bob Gooding

Personal details
- Born: May 2, 1958 (age 68) Marion, Ohio, U.S.
- Party: Democratic

Randy Weston (born May 2, 1958) is a former American politician who served as a Democratic member of the Ohio House of Representatives from 1991 to 1999. His district consisted of a portion of Crawford, Wyandot, Marion, and Seneca counties. Weston won all five of his elections to the House of Representatives successively and within a nine-year span. He was succeeded by Bob Gooding, who was appointed to the position after Weston resigned to accept another position. The next individual to win the seat in election was Steve Reinhard.
