= Megan Coy =

American politician

Member-elect of the Ohio House of Representatives from the 17th district
- Assuming office January 1, 2027
- Succeeding: Mike Dovilla

Personal details
- Party: Democratic
- Education: Cleveland State University; Francis Marion University; University of South Carolina
- Website: Official website

Megan Coy is an American politician who is the member-elect for the 17th district of the Ohio House of Representatives, succeeding to the office on January 1, 2027. She was elected in the 2026 election, unseating incumbent Republican Mike Dovilla. She is a registered nurse and Olmsted Falls City Councilwoman At-Large.
