= Scott Wiggam =

American politician from Ohio

Member of the Ohio House of Representatives from the 77th district
- In office January 3, 2023 – December 31, 2024
- Preceded by: Jeff LaRe
- Succeeded by: Meredith Craig

Member of the Ohio House of Representatives from the 1st district
- In office January 3, 2017 – December 31, 2022
- Preceded by: Ron Amstutz
- Succeeded by: Dontavius Jarrells

Personal details
- Party: Republican
- Spouse: Katie Wiggam
- Education: Asbury University (BA); University of Akron (MA)

Military service
- Allegiance: United States
- Branch/service: United States Air Force

Scott Wiggam is an American politician. He was the state representative for the 77th district of the Ohio House of Representatives, as a Republican representing Wayne County.

On June 14, 2023, Wiggam assaulted a trans rights activist on the grounds of the Ohio Statehouse. The activist filed a lawsuit over the incident on June 13, 2024.

== Early life and career ==
Wiggam was born and raised in Wilmore, Kentucky. Wiggam is a graduate of Asbury University and was a Bible major. He has a master's degree in political science from the University of Akron. veteran of the United States Air Force, Wiggam did a four-year active duty tour where he was honored with an Air Force Commendation Medal for meritorious service.

Wiggam briefly worked as a lobbyist for a Christian organization. Wiggam is the State Chair of Ohio for the American Legislative Exchange Council, a corporate funded non-profit that hosts closed-door meetings between global corporations and state politicians to influence legislation.

Wiggam owned and operated The Neighborhood Cafe in Wooster for about one year before deciding to instead focus on a career in government .

== Wayne County Commissioner ==
Wiggam was elected to Wayne County Commissioner in 2004.

In 2009, he supported cutting the Sheriff's Office budget by $471,397, which resulted in laying off 13 deputies and diminished law enforcement service.

In 2010, Wiggam said he would be in favor of putting a sales tax increase on the ballot.

In 2011, Wiggam was the only commissioner to vote against allowing Medway Drug Enforcement Agency to put a replacement levy on the ballot. The levy sought to replace the original levy that was passed in 1984.

The Wayne County Courthouse underwent a substantial restoration project during Wiggam's tenure as commissioner. A historic preservation analysis of the building was conducted in 2002 that identified numerous areas of significant deterioration. Some of these issues were not addressed for 13 more years and further damage resulted from weather exposure. The cost of repairs was estimated to be $2.5M in 2002 but increased to $5.5M when they were finally addressed in 2015. The construction contract was awarded to J. G. Johnson Construction Co from Cleveland.

== Ohio House of Representatives ==
State Representative Ron Amstutz, who was serving as Speaker pro Tempore, had served in both the Ohio House and Ohio Senate for over thirty years before being term-limited in 2016. As a result, Wiggam was one of two Republicans to seek the nomination to replace him. With the district being made up of Wayne County, which Wiggam had represented as a commissioner for three terms, he defeated opponent David C. Kiefer by a 66% to 34% margin in the primary.

In the general election, he defeated independent Stephen R. Spoonamore with 67% of the vote. Spoonamore filed a lawsuit against Wiggam and other Republican politicians in Wayne County after he was initially denied permission to appear on the ballot as an independent. A judge ruled in Spoonamore's favor, allowing him to be on the ballot. Wayne County Common Pleas Court Judge Mark K. Wiest stated, "Some people believe Mr. Spoonamore is not qualified. ... I'm just wondering why we can't have an election? Ron Amstutz held that seat (for 30 years) ... why can't people have a choice? What are people afraid of?"

Wiggam refused to participate in a debate hosted by the Wayne County League of Women Voters, maintaining his argument that Spoonamore was not a legitimate candidate. Wiggam was sworn into office on January 3, 2017.

In the 2020 general election, Wiggam defeated Democrat Alison Theiss, a school bus driver and Certified Professional Sex Coach that had never held elected office. Wiggam did not respond to an invitation to participate in a debate sponsored by the Wayne County League of Women Voters.

=== HB6 Vote ===
Scott Wiggam voted in favor of House Bill 6, the nuclear bailout bill for two Ohio facilities. According to public campaign finance reports, Wiggam received $3,000 from the FirstEnergy PAC in 2019 and another $4,000 in 2020, as did dozens of other members of the Ohio General Assembly. Wiggam also received $500 from Juan Cespedes, who was arrested along with Householder. Wiggam is a member of both the Public Utility & Energy & Natural Resource committees and voted to have Householder as Speaker of the House. Despite formal opposition from the Orrville Utilities Board, which represents a municipal-owned power plant in his district, Wiggam still voted in support of HB6.

Wiggam publicly stated on social media the reason he supported HB6, “House Bill 6 actually lowered the average Ohioan’s electrical bill and ratepayers will see a cost savings of at least $1.3 billion over the next seven years by eliminating costly and inefficient energy programs. House Bill 6 also allows Ohio's nuclear plants which produce 15% of Ohio's energy (and 90% of Ohio's "clean" energy) to have an opportunity to compete in an extremely competitive energy market while saving 4000 jobs. Although I was not initially in favor of the bill I worked hard to reform it to serve the citizens of Wayne County by immediately reducing average ratepayers bills, focusing on clean energy generation in Ohio instead of out of state generators and creating a stepping stone to a more competitive energy market which will continue to lower energy costs for Ohio citizens.”

Wiggam was not among many prominent Republicans that called on Householder to resign after news of the scandal broke. During the 134th Ohio General Assembly, Wiggam voted against the expulsion of former Ohio House Speaker Larry Householder. At the time of the vote, Householder had been federally indicted in connection with the Ohio nuclear bribery scandal, which centered on the passage of House Bill 6. The Ohio House of Representatives voted 75–21 to expel Householder, with Wiggam among the 21 Republican members who opposed the resolution.

Wiggam also continued to defend HB6 even after the alleged bribery and racketeering scheme behind it came to light. “I do and will continue to defend this legislation,” he wrote in a public statement.

Despite receiving campaign money from First Energy Corp PAC, voting for HB6, and continuing to defend it after the alleged scandal was revealed, Wiggam was appointed to the Select Committee charged with reviewing and repealing the bill. The committee failed to repeal the bill by the end of the 2020 session. After being appointed to the Select Committee, Wiggam accepted campaign contributions from American Electric Power PAC, which stands to benefit if HB6 is not repealed.

=== Allegations by Former Aide ===
In January 2019, Wiggam's former legislative aide Marissa Reyes wrote a two-page letter to her Ohio General Assembly Representative Kristin Boggs accusing certain GOP lawmakers and staff of racist and sexist comments. In the letter, also posted to her Twitter account, Reyes claims that during her time in Wiggam's office, "I had to endure months of unacceptable treatment and was forced to listen to the Representative’s opinions that painted myself, my family and other Hispanics in a demeaning light. When I respectfully disagreed with the Representative about an issue, I was told that ‘women do not think logically, they think with their hearts not with their brains.’"

At least some of the complaints were submitted to the House Administrative Office in Sept 2018. In January 2019, the House Administrative Office released its findings, which found no legal wrongdoing, but resulted in a warning being issued to another legislative aide accused of discriminatory behavior in the complaint.

Reyes was laid off from her position as legislative aide to Wiggam at the end of January 2019, the same month that she published her letter about the harassment.

As Wayne County Commissioner, Wiggam opposed efforts to ban the sale of confederate flags at the county fair. Confederate flags are seen as symbols of white supremacy and slavery by opponents. As a state representative, he voted against a bill that would prohibit the confederate flag at county fairs throughout the state.

=== COVID-19 pandemic response ===
Wiggam has been a vocal critic of public health measures instituted to limit the spread of COVID-19. On June 3, 2020, Wiggam was one of 19 lawmakers that signed a letter stating “Ohio smashed the curve long ago. Mission Accomplished!” The letter argued that the peak of the virus was well past over and was time for the public health orders to be cancelled. Ohio's average cases per day skyrocketed in subsequent months, to much higher than what was seen in June. Wiggam has argued that Ohio should pursue a “herd immunity” strategy. This approach is not supported by most scientists and would result in up to two million deaths in the United States. When asked in an interview about the June letter in October, Wiggam stated that he believed there was “a lot of misconstrued data” and that numbers reported by health officials were inaccurate and “padded by false positives.” Wiggam stated that the nation was only focused on the pandemic because Republicans controlled the White House.

=== Position on State executions ===
Wiggam is a proponent of the death penalty and in August 2019 announced he would be sponsoring a bill to execute prisoners in Ohio with fentanyl, an illegal opioid. No other state has passed a similar law. Governor Mike DeWine dismissed Wiggam's proposal.

=== Endorsement of 2020 presidential election theories ===
In November 2020, Wiggam posted about fraud in the 2020 US presidential election on Twitter, implying it could be “illegitimate.” He stated that, “there are literally thousands of fraudulent reports coming in...” He provided a link to an article from The Epoch Times, a far-right website known for spreading misinformation and conspiracy theories about QAnon. Wiggam stated that the media was “ignoring the growing evidence of voter fraud just like they ignored Hunter’s laptop.”.

=== Allegations of campaign finance fraud ===
A complaint filed with the Ohio Elections Commission alleged that Scott Wiggam's campaign received valuable software at no cost from a right wing organization ALEC that assists conservative lawmakers. If true, this would constitute an illegal contribution violating both Federal campaign finance law and the Ohio Revised Code.

== Personal life ==
He is married with three children and resides in Wooster, Ohio.
