= Krista Allison =

American politician

Member-elect of the Ohio House of Representatives from the 49th district
- Assuming office January 1, 2027
- Succeeding: Jim Thomas

Personal details
- Party: Democratic
- Education: Baldwin Wallace University; Case Western Reserve University School of Law
- Website: Official website

Krista L. Allison is an American politician who is the member-elect for the 49th district of the Ohio House of Representatives, succeeding to the office on January 1, 2027. She was elected in the 2026 election, unseating incumbent Republican Jim Thomas. She is a community leader from Stark County, Ohio.
