= Adam Holmes =

American politician (born 1967)

Member of the Ohio House of Representatives from the 97th district
- Incumbent
- Assumed office February 6, 2019
- Preceded by: Brian Hill

Personal details
- Born: July 31, 1967 (age 59)
- Party: Republican
- Education: United States Naval Academy; University of San Diego

Military service
- Branch/service: United States Marine Corps
- Rank: Colonel

Adam Holmes (born July 31, 1967) is a member of the Ohio House of Representatives, representing the 97th district since 2019. A Republican, Holmes' district includes Guernsey County and the majority of Muskingum County.

== Education and career ==
Holmes earned a Bachelor of Science in political science from the United States Naval Academy and a Master of Science in global leadership from the University of San Diego. He served for more than 27 years on active duty in the United States Marine Corps, including as an aviator, and retired as a colonel in 2016. His military service included operations in Iraq and Somalia.

Holmes has also served as chief executive officer of Frueh Enterprises, a mechanical and industrial contracting company based in Zanesville, Ohio.

== Ohio House of Representatives ==
=== Appointment and elections ===
In 2019, State Representative Brian Hill was appointed to the Ohio Senate, creating a vacancy in the 97th district. Soon, it was announced that Holmes had been chosen by Ohio House Republicans to fill the vacancy and serve out the remainder of Hill's term. He was sworn into office on February 6, 2019.

Holmes won election to a full term in 2020, defeating Democratic candidate Alaina Swope. He was reelected without opposition in 2022. In 2024, he defeated independent candidate Scott Wilson, receiving 35,081 votes to Wilson's 12,120.

=== Legislative work ===
Holmes was the primary House sponsor of House Bill 214, which restricted public schools from requiring students, staff, or prospective employees to affirm specified political principles. The final legislation also included provisions accommodating students' religious observances. Holmes said the restrictions were intended to protect people from penalties for expressing political views. The Ohio Education Association opposed the measure, arguing that existing professional standards already protected against discrimination based on political beliefs. Governor Mike DeWine signed the bill on July 24, 2024.

In 2025, Holmes chaired the House Energy Committee. He argued that provisions of House Bill 15 allowing large electricity users, including data centers, to generate power on site could reduce delays in obtaining permits for energy projects.

In May 2026, Holmes and state senator Brian Chavez announced a bipartisan legislative committee on data centers, with both legislators as co-chairs. The committee was established to examine the economic, environmental, and security implications of data center development in Ohio.

Holmes is credited as "Military Strategy Consultant" in the popular science fiction film Coherence.

== Links ==
- Representative Adam Holmes (official site)
