= Wes Goodman =

American politician

Member of the Ohio House of Representatives from the 87th district
- In office November 16, 2016 – November 14, 2017
- Preceded by: Jeffrey McClain
- Succeeded by: Riordan McClain

Personal details
- Born: February 14, 1984 (age 42) Morrow County, Ohio, United States
- Party: Republican
- Spouse: Bethany Goodman (m. 2012; div. 2018)
- Education: Ohio Wesleyan University (B.A.)

Wesley Goodman (born February 14, 1984) is an American former Republican politician who served as the Ohio State Representative for the 87th District from 2016 until his resignation in 2017. His former district consists of Crawford, Morrow and Wyandot counties, as well as portions of Marion and Seneca counties.

On November 14, 2017, Goodman resigned his seat following alleged "inappropriate behavior" in his state office, later revealed as an extramarital sexual encounter with a man.

== Early life ==
Goodman was born into a family of farmers and first responders, and is a native of Cardington, Ohio. He graduated in 2006 from Ohio Wesleyan University, where he majored in politics and government.

== Political career ==
Goodman worked briefly for former U.S. senator and Ohio attorney general Mike DeWine before joining the staff of U.S. representative Jim Jordan (R-OH). By 2013, Goodman was serving as the managing director of the Conservative Action Project. He was also a Claremont Institute Lincoln Fellow in 2013.

In June 2015, Goodman announced his candidacy for the District 87 seat in the Ohio House of Representatives. Jeffrey McClain, the District 87 representative at the time, could not run again in 2016 due to term limits. In the March 2016 Republican primary, Goodman defeated former state representative Steve Reinhard with 41% of the vote; Reinhard had represented the same seat from 2001 to 2008. Goodman ran unopposed in the 2016 general election. His term began on January 4, 2017.

In October 2015, an 18-year-old man accused Goodman of sexually assaulting him. This was reported to Tony Perkins, head of the Family Research Council, who confronted Goodman about the allegation and referred to other "similar incidents." Perkins withdrew his political support, but Goodman did not withdraw his candidacy for the Ohio legislature and was elected in 2016. These incidents were apparently never reported to the police and did not become public knowledge until after Goodman's resignation.

== Marriage, sex scandal, and resignation ==
Goodman described himself as a supporter of "traditional marriage," having told constituents that the "ideals of a loving father and mother, a committed natural marriage, and a caring community are well worth pursuing and protecting." In 2012 he married an assistant director of the March for Life. The couple had no children and subsequently divorced after Goodman resigned his office November 14, 2017, after a non-staffer witnessed him and an unnamed adult male having consensual sexual relations in Goodman's office. The Speaker of the Ohio House, a Republican, Cliff Rosenberger, described the incident as "inappropriate behavior related to his state office."

Political offices
Preceded by Jeffrey McClain	Ohio House of Representatives, 87th District; 2016–2017	Succeeded by Riordan McClain
