= Jeffrey McClain =

American politician

Jeff McClain

Member of the Ohio House of Representatives from the 87th district
- In office January 5, 2009 – October 2, 2016
- Preceded by: Steve Reinhard
- Succeeded by: Wes Goodman
- Assuming office January 1, 2027
- Succeeding: Riordan McClain

Personal details
- Born: February 2, 1958 (age 68) Upper Sandusky, Ohio, U.S.
- Party: Republican
- Children: 3, including Riordan
- Profession: Auditor

Jeff McClain (born February 2, 1958) is a Republican member-elect of the Ohio House of Representatives who represented the 87th District from 2009 to 2016, and in 2026, was elected to succeed his son, Riordan.

== Career ==
McClain was the Wyandot County auditor for over 26 years.

=== Ohio House of Representatives ===
When Representative Steve Reinhard was unable to run for another term due to term limits, McClain, along with Lois Fisher, sought the Republican nomination. McClain won the primary election with 60.72% of the votes. He won the general election with 53.63% of the vote. On January 5, 2009, he was sworn into his first term. McClain was elected to a second term in 2010 unopposed. In 2014, McClain was elected to serve his fourth consecutive term with 73% of the vote.

With Senator Karen Gillmor resigning from her seat, McClain had been named as a possible successor. However, the appointment went to David Burke.

=== Ohio Chamber of Commerce ===
Term limited in 2016, McClain resigned early to work for the Ohio Chamber of Commerce.
