= J. Noah Spinner =

American politician

Member-elect of the Ohio House of Representatives from the 31st district
- Assuming office January 1, 2027
- Succeeding: Bill Roemer

Personal details
- Party: Democratic
- Education: University of Akron
- Website: Official website

J. Noah Spinner is an American politician who is the member-elect for the 31st district of the Ohio House of Representatives, succeeding to the office on January 1, 2027. He was elected in the November 2026 general election. He is an attorney from Cuyahoga Falls.
