= Jesse Styles =

American politician

Member-elect of the Ohio House of Representatives from the 57th district
- Assuming office January 1, 2027
- Succeeding: Jamie Callender

Personal details
- Party: Republican
- Website: Official website

Jesse Styles is an American politician who is the member-elect for the 57th district of the Ohio House of Representatives, succeeding to the office on January 1, 2027. A Republican, he was elected in the 2026 election.

Styles was born in 1978 or 1979. He received a bachelor's degree from Cleveland State University. As of 2026, he lived in Kirtland, Ohio. At the time of the election, he worked as the founder and CEO of Northstar Towers, a provider of wireless towers.
