= Daquan Neal =

American politician

Member-elect of the Ohio House of Representatives from the 39th district
- Assuming office January 1, 2027
- Succeeding: Phil Plummer

Personal details
- Party: Democratic
- Website: Official website

Daquan Neal is an American politician who is the member-elect for the 39th district of the Ohio House of Representatives, succeeding to the office on January 1, 2027. He was elected in the 2026 election.
