= Meredith Craig =

American politician

Member of the Ohio House of Representatives from the 77th district
- Incumbent
- Assumed office December 1, 2024
- Preceded by: Scott Wiggam

Personal details
- Party: Republican
- Education: Malone University
- Website: www.meredithcraigforohio.com

Meredith Craig is an American politician serving as a member of the Ohio House of Representatives from the 77th district. A Republican, she was elected in the 2024 Ohio House of Representatives election. She serves as vice chair of the Insurance Committee, as well as a member of the Health, Medicaid, and Veterans & Military Development Committees.
