= Matthew Kishman =

American politician

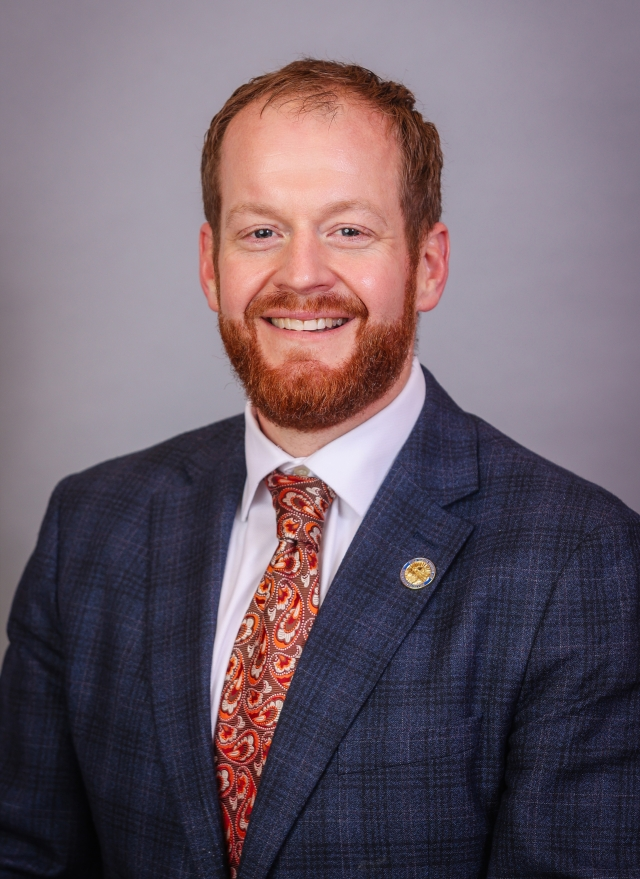

Member of the Ohio House of Representatives from the 50th district
- Incumbent
- Assumed office December 1, 2024
- Preceded by: Reggie Stoltzfus

Personal details
- Party: Republican
- Education: Youngstown State University
- Website: www.votekishman.com

Matthew Kishman is an American politician serving as a member of the Ohio House of Representatives from the 50th district.

Kishman graduated from Minerva High School and earned a Bachelor of Arts in communication from Youngstown State University, where he played football as an offensive lineman. He worked as director of operations for his family's business, Kishman's IGA Markets, and also served on the Minerva Chamber Board of Directors and on Minerva Village Council. He is on the Ohio Ireland Trade Commission.

A Republican, he was elected in the 2024 Ohio House of Representatives election.

== Committee assignments ==
As of June 2026, Kishman serves on the following committees in the Ohio House.

- Local Government (vice chair)
- Commerce and Labor
- Public Safety
- Small Business
