= Kevin Ritter =

American politician (born 1967)

Member of the Ohio House of Representatives from the 94th district
- Incumbent
- Assumed office January 6, 2025
- Preceded by: Jay Edwards

Personal details
- Born: August 5, 1967 (age 58) Muskegon, Michigan, U.S.
- Party: Republican
- Spouse: Khadine Ritter
- Children: Liam Ritter, Anna Ritter

Kevin Ritter (born August 5, 1967) is an American politician and teacher serving as a member of the Ohio House of Representatives for the 94th district. He won the seat after incumbent Republican Jay Edwards became term-limited after completing his fourth term in 2024. He defeated Democrat Wenda Sheard in 2024, winning 69.3% to 30.7%. A member of the Republican Party, Ritter previously served as a Washington County Commissioner from 2019 to 2024.
