= Jodi Salvo =

American politician

Member of the Ohio House of Representatives from the 51st district
- Incumbent
- Assumed office December 1, 2024
- Preceded by: Brett Hillyer

Personal details
- Born: Pittsburgh, Pennsylvania
- Party: Republican
- Education: Pennsylvania Western University, California; Marywood University
- Website: ohiohouse.gov/members/jodi-salvo

Jodi Salvo is an American politician serving as a member of the Ohio House of Representatives from the 51st district. A Republican, she was elected in the 2024 Ohio House of Representatives election.

Salvo was born in Pittsburgh, and earned a bachelor degree from California University of Pennsylvania, and a graduate degree from Marywood in 1994. Salvo has worked as a nonprofit director and social worker.

Salvo is the vice chair of the House Children and Human Services Committee, as well as a member of the Community Revitalization, Energy, and Natural Resources Committees.
