= Erika White (politician) =

American politician

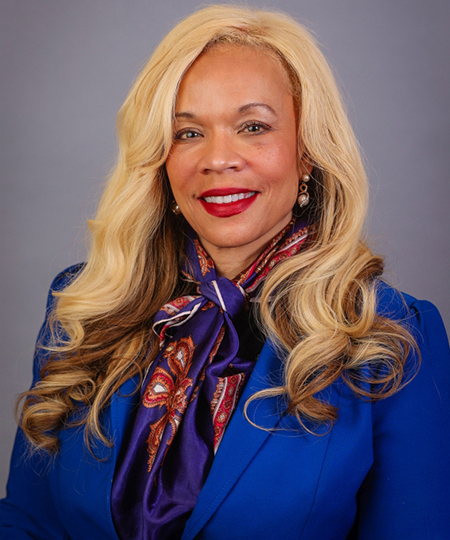

Member of the Ohio House of Representatives from the 41st district
- Incumbent
- Assumed office January 1, 2025
- Preceded by: Derek Merrin

Personal details
- Born: 1972 or 1973 (age 53–54)
- Party: Democratic Party

Erika White (born 1972/1973) is an American politician who is a Democratic member of the Ohio House of Representatives representing the 41st district, first elected in the 2024 Ohio House of Representatives election. The district is based entirely in Lucas County and includes parts of Toledo, Maumee, and Holland. White previously ran in the 2022 Ohio House of Representatives election, but lost to Derek Merrin. Following redistricting, she ran in the 41st district.

She formerly served as the Health Chair for the Toledo chapter of the NAACP. She also served as a board member for the Communications Workers of America.
