= Ty Mathews =

American politician (born 1995)

Member of the Ohio House of Representatives from the 83rd district
- Incumbent
- Assumed office January 1, 2025
- Preceded by: Jon Cross

Personal details
- Party: Republican
- Education: Cedarville University

Ty D. Mathews (born 1995) is an American politician who is a Republican member of the Ohio House of Representatives, representing the 83rd district. He was first elected in the 2024 Ohio House of Representatives election, defeating Democratic nominee Sheila Coressel with 75.1% of the vote. The district includes all of Hancock County, Hardin County, and northern parts of Logan County, including the communities of Russells Point, Findlay, Ada, and Kenton.

== Personal life and education ==
Mathews graduated from Arlington High School. Mathews earned a degree in political science from Cedarville University in 2018. He also served as an infantry officer in the United States Army prior to his election. He previously worked as an assistant to the Ohio State Treasurer.

== Political positions ==
=== Defense ===
During an interview, Mathews expressed support for increasing the defense industry in Ohio.

=== Marijuana ===
In April 2025, Mathews and other Republicans introduced a bill in the Ohio House to add restrictions to the sale of Delta-8 and similar products in Ohio.

=== Term limits ===
Mathews supports congressional term limits.

=== Trade ===
Mathews is a proponent of the International Trade Commission.
