= Ukeme Awakessian Jetter =

American politician

Member-elect of the Ohio House of Representatives from the 7th district
- Assuming office January 4, 2027
- Succeeding: Allison Russo

Personal details
- Born: Nsit-Ibom, Akwa Ibom State, Nigeria
- Party: Democratic
- Education: University of Maine; Case Western Reserve University School of Law; University of Massachusetts Lowell
- Website: Campaign website

Ukeme Awakessian Jetter is an American politician who is the member-elect for the 7th district of the Ohio House of Representatives. She was elected in the 2026 election and will succeed to the office on January 1, 2027. She was born in Nsit-Ibom in Akwa Ibom State, Nigeria. She moved to Upper Arlington, Ohio in 2018. She is the author of "Immigrit", a book about immigration. She was the first person of color to be a member of the city council in Upper Arlington. She is mayor of Upper Arlington.
