= Dontavius Jarrells =

American politician

Dontavius L. Jarrells
- State Representative Jarrells in 2026.

Member of the Ohio House of Representatives from the 1st district
- Incumbent
- Assumed office January 3, 2023
- Preceded by: Scott Wiggam

Member of the Ohio House of Representatives from the 25th district
- In office January 4, 2021 – December 31, 2022
- Preceded by: Bernadine Kent
- Succeeded by: Cecil Thomas

Personal details
- Born: April 4, 1988 (age 38)
- Party: Democratic
- Education: Hiram College

Dontavius L. Jarrells is a Democratic member of the Ohio House of Representatives representing the 1st district. He was elected in 2020, defeating Republican Jim Burgess with 82% of the vote. Prior to his election to the Ohio House, Jarrells worked at the Franklin County Treasurer's Office as the Chief of Communications.

== Ohio House of Representatives ==
=== Election ===
Jarrells was elected in the general election on November 3, 2020. He was reelected in 2022 and was redistricted to serve the 1st District. He was reelected unopposed in the 2024 Ohio House of Representatives election.

=== Committees ===
Jarrells serves on the following committees: Arts, Athletics, and Tourism where he serves as ranking member, Finance, and Insurance.

== Election history ==
Ohio House 25th District
Year	Democrat	Votes	Pct	Republican	Votes	Pct
2020	Dontavius Jarrells	41,312	82.3%	Jim Burgess	8,870	17.7%
