= Patti Rockey =

American politician

Member-elect of the Ohio House of Representatives from the 81th district
- Assuming office January 1, 2027
- Succeeding: Jim Hoops

Personal details
- Born: October 15, 1973 (age 53) Ohio, U.S.
- Party: Republican
- Spouse: Jason Rockey

Patricia A. Rockey is an American politician who is the member-elect for the 81st District of the Ohio House of Representatives, succeeding to the office on January 1, 2027. She has served as a school board member for the Montpelier Exempted Village School District.
