= Bernadine Kent =

American politician

Bernadine Kennedy Kent

Member of the Ohio House of Representatives from the 25th district
- In office January 3, 2017 – December 31, 2020
- Preceded by: Kevin Boyce
- Succeeded by: Dontavius Jarrells

Personal details
- Party: Republican Party (2024-present)
- Other political affiliations: Democratic before 2024
- Education: Central State University (B.S.)

Bernadine Kennedy Kent is a former state representative for the 25th District of the Ohio House of Representatives. She is a Democrat. The district consists of a portion of Columbus as well as portions of Blendon, Clinton, Mifflin and Sharon townships in Franklin County.

== Life and career ==
Kennedy Kent was born and raised in East Chicago, Indiana, as the daughter of immigrants from the South who worked in the steel mills. She would later attend Central State University, settling in Ohio thereafter. Her husband, a Vietnam Green Beret, is the son of a Tuskegee Airman.

A lifelong educator, Kent taught for years in the Columbus Public Schools system. She ran unsuccessfully for the Columbus Board of Education twice. Despite this, Kennedy Kent was successful in her run for State Representative of the 25th district in 2016. She is known as a whistleblower and known as a community advocate on a variety of issues.

== Ohio House of Representatives ==
In 2016, Kennedy Kent opted to run for the Ohio House following news that incumbent Representative Kevin Boyce would instead run for Franklin County Commissioner. In a four-way Democratic primary, Kennedy Kent received a plurality of over 35% of the vote. Kennedy Kent received the endorsement of the Franklin County Democratic Party, the Columbus Education Association and other union groups. She was also endorsed by the Columbus Dispatch. In her first term as State Representative of the 25th District and with a majority Republican House and Senate, Representative Kent introduced H.B. 317 to mandate that Ohio law enforcement report child abuse and neglect. Ohio had been the only state left where law enforcement were not mandated reporters.

After criticism for use of an official Ohio Legislative Black Caucus letterhead as Vice President of the black caucus, she was expelled from Ohio's House Democratic caucus. Citing safety reasons and intimidation, she has refused to show up at the Ohio Statehouse for over a year after being physically obstructed from her Caucus by the Caucus legal counsel Sarah Cherry but still retains her seat and her salary.

Representative Kent has stated her constituents are losing out because of the actions of her Democratic colleagues. She also created a second bill, which passed into law, that named a highway in memory of an Ohio Department of Transportation worker. She has also retained an attorney to file a writ of mandamus to fight for victims of crime and ensure Marsy's law is adhered to after Ohioans overwhelmingly voted to amend the Ohio Constitution to expand the rights of victims of crimes.

In September 2020, Kennedy Kent endorsed Republican President Donald Trump for reelection over Democratic nominee Joe Biden.

Political offices
Preceded by Kevin Boyce	Ohio House of Representatives, 25th District; 2017–present	Incumbent
