= Mike Odioso =

American politician

Member of the Ohio House of Representatives from the 30th district
- Incumbent
- Assumed office December 1, 2024
- Preceded by: Bill Seitz

Personal details
- Born: Summit, New Jersey
- Party: Republican
- Website: www.odiosoforohio.com

Mike Odioso is an American politician serving as a member of the Ohio House of Representatives from the 30th district. A Republican, he was elected in the 2024 Ohio House of Representatives election.
