= Crystal Lett =

American politician

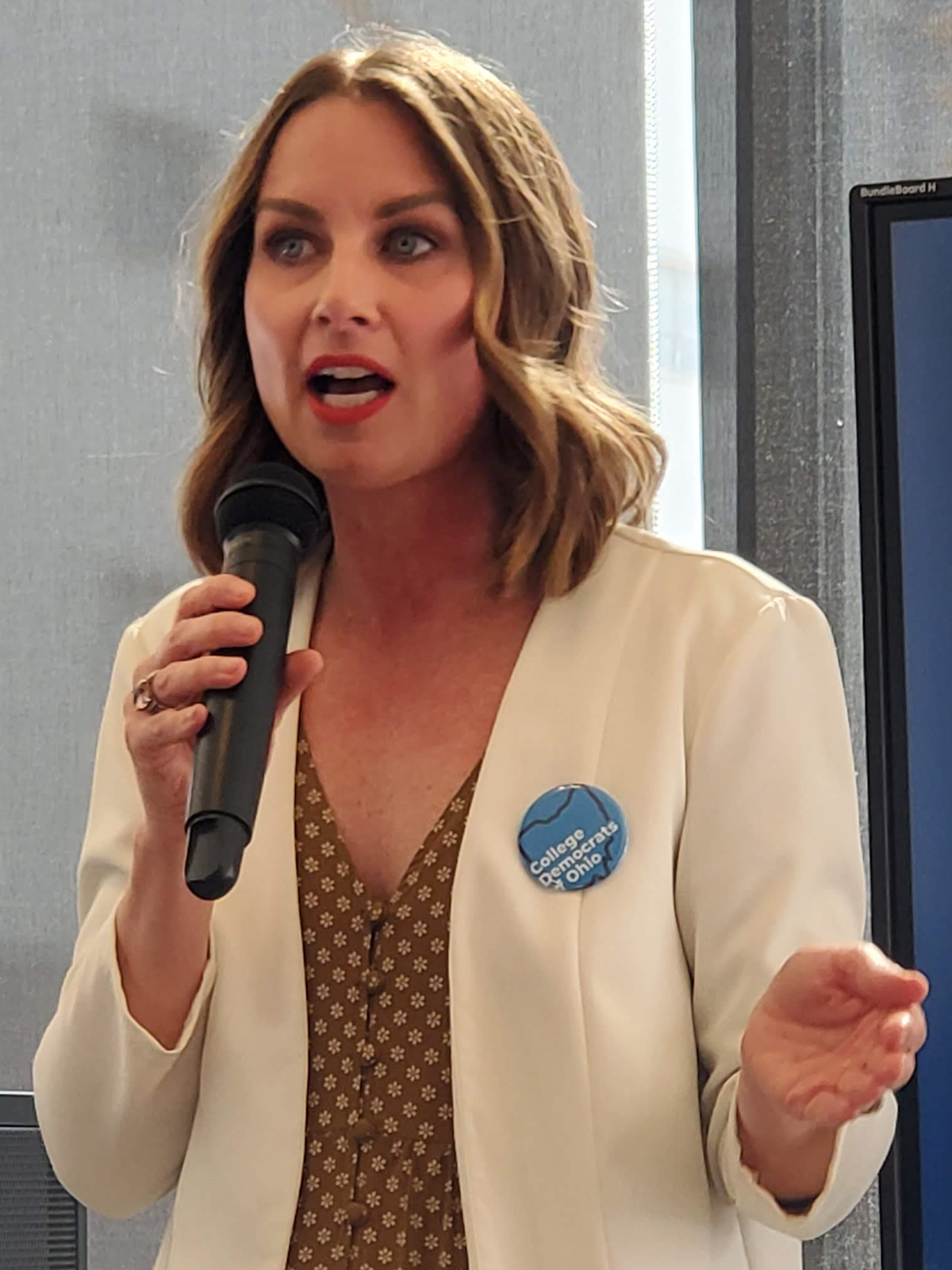

Member of the Ohio House of Representatives from the 11th district
- Incumbent
- Assumed office January 1, 2025
- Preceded by: Anita Somani

Personal details
- Party: Democratic Party
- Education: Hilliard Davidson High School and Ohio State University

Crystal Lett is an American politician who is a Democratic member of the Ohio House of Representatives, representing the 11th district. She was first elected in the 2024 Ohio House of Representatives election, defeating Republican nominee and former state senator Stephanie Kunze with 51.8% of the vote. The district is based in Franklin County, taking in the communities of Dublin and Hilliard.

Lett ran in the 2020 Ohio Senate election in District 16, but lost to Kunze.

Lett is currently the ranking chair of the Children and Human Services Committee, as well as the Medicaid and Small Business Committees.

== Personal life and education ==
Lett graduated from Hilliard Davidson High School and earned a political science degree at Ohio State University. She worked as a case manager for children with mental illnesses prior to her election to the Ohio House.

== Political views ==
=== LGBTQ+ rights ===
Lett was a sponsor of House Bill 136, also known as the Fairness Act, which aimed to expand legal protections for LGBTQ+ Ohioans.

== Electoral history ==
2020 Ohio State Senate election results, District 16
Party	Candidate	Votes	%
Republican	Stephanie Kunze	106,053	50.03
Democratic	Crystal Lett	105,937	49.97
Total votes		211,990	100

2024 Ohio House of Representatives election results, District 11
Party	Candidate	Votes	%
Democratic	Crystal Lett	33,327	51.8
Republican	Stephanie Kunze	30,965	48.2
Total votes		64,292	100
