= Michelle Teska =

American politician

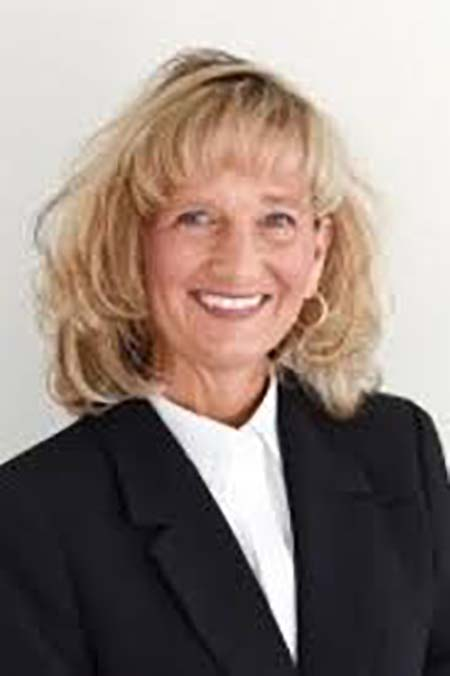

Member of the Ohio House of Representatives from the 55th district
- Incumbent
- Assumed office January 1, 2025
- Preceded by: Scott Lipps

Personal details
- Born: 1970 or 1971 (age 55–56)
- Party: Republican
- Spouse: Steve Teska
- Children: 1
- Education: University of Dayton

Michelle Teska (born 1970–1971) is an American politician who is a Republican member of the Ohio House of Representatives, representing the 55th district. She was first elected in the 2024 Ohio House of Representatives election, defeating Democratic nominee Laura Marie Davis with 72.53% of the vote. The district is based in Warren County.

== Personal life and education ==
Teska was raised in Beavercreek. She is Presbyterian. She graduated from the University of Dayton with a degree in communications. She is an owner of Miami Valley Golden Heart Senior Care, which provides services to seniors. She was also a national sales manager for Cox Media Group.

== Political Careers ==
Teska was first elected in 2024, defeating Democrat Laura Marie Davis to fill the seat of the term limited Republican Scott Lipps. Her district includes most of Warren County. Teska opposes abortion.

=== Committee assignments ===
As of June 2026, Teska serves on the following committees in the Ohio House.

- Public Insurance and Pensions (vice chair)
- Community Revitalization
- Financial Institutions
- Small Business
