= David Thomas (Ohio politician) =

American politician

Member of the Ohio House of Representatives from the 65th district
- Incumbent
- Assumed office January 6, 2025
- Preceded by: Mike Loychik

Personal details
- Born: April 5, 1993 (age 32)
- Political party: Republican

David Thomas (born April 5, 1993) is an American politician who is a Republican member of the Ohio House of Representatives, representing the 65th district. He won the primary with 72% of the vote. The district is based in Ashtabula and Trumbull counties, taking in the communities of Cortland, Hubbard, North Kingsville and Geneva.

== Personal life and education ==
Thomas is Evangelical. Prior to his election to the Ohio House, Thomas served as the Ashtabula County Auditor.

== Political views ==
=== Property taxes ===
Thomas supports tax breaks and reforms to the Ohio Tax Code for property owners.
