= Mark Hiner =

American politician

Member of the Ohio House of Representatives from the 98th district
- Preceded by: Darrell Kick

Personal details
- Party: Republican
- Spouse: Veronica Hiner
- Children: 2
- Education: Ashland University and Ohio University

Mark Hiner is an American politician who is a Republican member of the Ohio House of Representatives, representing the 98th district.

== Personal life and education ==
Hiner was raised in Ashland, Ohio and eventually moved to Knox County, near Howard. He is a member of the National Rifle Association. He earned a Bachelor of Science degree from Ashland University and a Master's degree from Ohio University.

== Political Career ==
Hiner was first elected in the 2024 Ohio House of Representatives election after incumbent Darrell Kick was term-limited, defeating Democratic nominee Annie Homstad with 75% of the vote in the general election. The district includes the entirety of Holmes County and Coshocton County, as well as portions of Knox County.

=== Committee assignments ===
As of June 2026, Hiner serves on the following committees in the Ohio House.

- Arts, Athletics, and Tourism (vice chair)
- Agriculture
- Natural Resources
- Small Business
