= Melanie Miller (politician) =

American politician (born 1986)

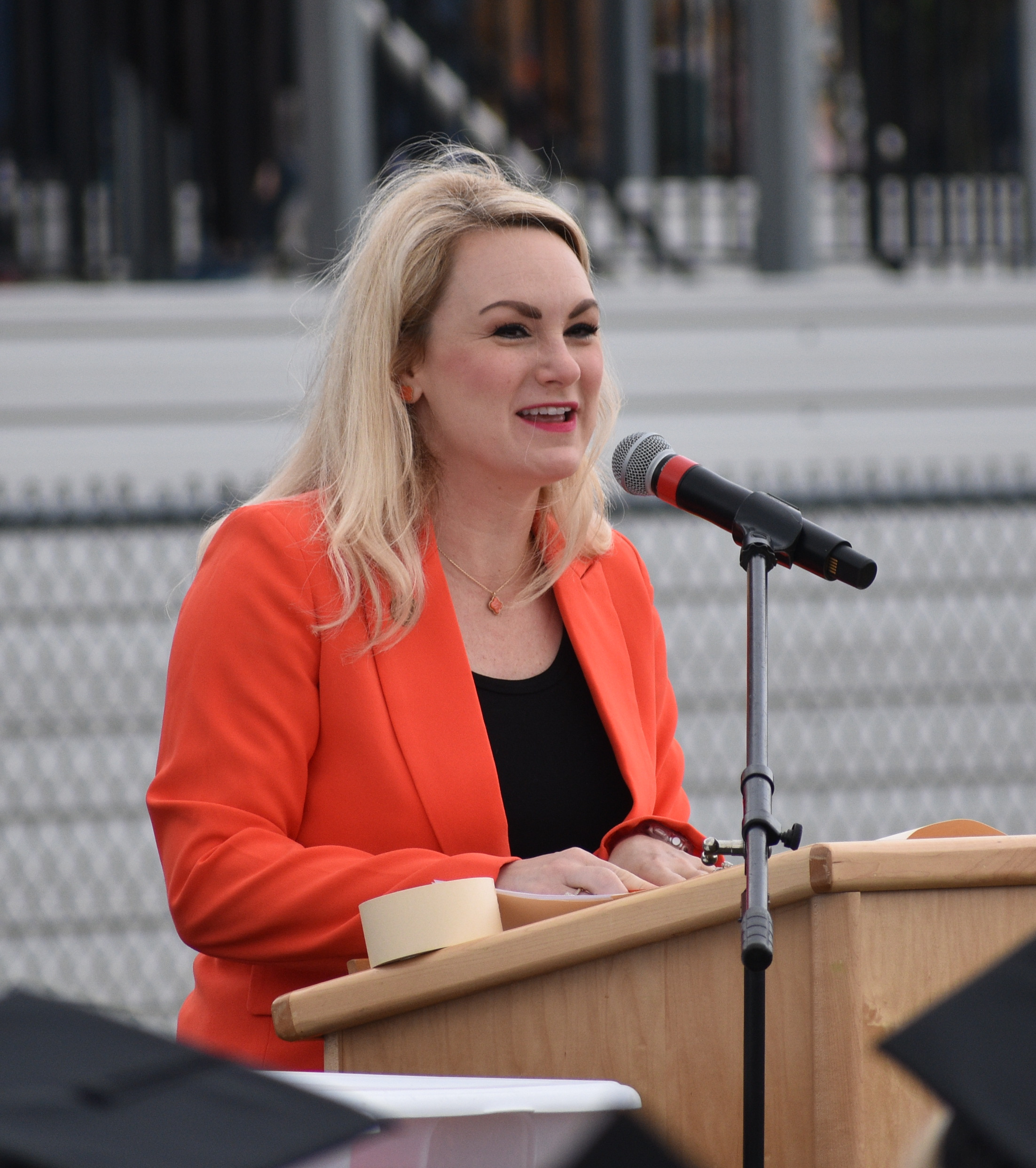
- Miller in 2025

Member of the Ohio House of Representatives from the 67th district
- Incumbent
- Assumed office January 1, 2023
- Preceded by: Kris Jordan

Personal details
- Born: Melanie Murphy; 1986 (age 39–40) Brook Park, Ohio, U.S.
- Party: Republican
- Spouse: Matt Miller (m. 2007)
- Education: Cleveland State University (BA)

Melanie Murphy Miller (born 1986) is an American politician serving as a member of the Ohio House of Representatives from the 67th district.

== Early life and education ==
In 2004, Miller graduated from Midpark High School, a public high school in Middleburg Heights, Ohio. In 2008, she graduated from Cleveland State University with a Bachelor of Arts in digital media and film production. During her sophomore year in 2006, she won a spot on the Cleveland Cavaliers dance team and was crowned Miss Ohio on July 8.

== Tenure ==
In November 2023, after Ohio voters approved a measure that would enshrine reproductive rights in the state's constitution, Miller was one of several Republicans who claimed that "[t]o prevent mischief by pro-abortion courts with Issue 1, Ohio legislators will consider removing jurisdiction from the judiciary over this ambiguous ballot initiative. The Ohio legislature alone will consider what, if any, modifications to make to existing laws".

In August 2023, Miller visited Israel as part of a bipartisan Ohio trade group tour.

=== Committee assignments ===
As of June 2026, Miller serves on the following committees in the Ohio House.

- Arts, Athletics, and Tourism (chair)
- Children and Human Services
- Health
- Technology and Innovation

== Election history ==
Election results
Year	Office	Election	Subject	Party	Votes	%	Opponent	Party	Votes	%	Opponent	Party	Votes	%
2022	Ohio House of Representatives	Primary	Melanie Miller	Republican	5,082	62.37%	Ron Falconi	Republican	2,478	30.41%	Terry Robertson	Republican	588	7.22%
2022	Ohio House of Representatives	General	Melanie Miller	Republican	31,657	70.23%	Drew Burge	Democratic	13,418	29.77%				

Awards and achievements
Preceded by Marlia Fontaine	Miss Ohio; 2006	Succeeded by Roberta Camp
