= Kellie Deeter =

American politician

Member of the Ohio House of Representatives from the 54th district
- Incumbent
- Assumed office December 1, 2024
- Preceded by: Dick Stein

Personal details
- Party: Republican
- Website: www.kelliedeeter.com/meet-kellie

Kellie Deeter is an American politician serving as a member of the Ohio House of Representatives from the 54th district. A Republican, she was elected in the 2024 Ohio House of Representatives election. Born and raised in Huron County, Deeter earned a bachelors in Nursing from Bowling Green State, and a Doctor of Nursing Practice from Maryville University of St. Louis. Deeter is a nurse practitioner and anesthetist.

== Committee assignments ==
As of June 2026, Deeter serves on the following committees in the Ohio House.

- Health (vice chair)
- Arts, Athletics, and Tourism
- Children and Human Services
- Insurance
- Medicaid
- Redistricting
