= Charity King =

American politician

Charity Martin-King

Member-elect of the Ohio House of Representatives from the 2nd district
- Assuming office January 1, 2027
- Succeeding: Latyna Humphrey

Personal details
- Party: Democratic
- Website: Official website

Charity Martin-King is an American politician and global humanitarian. She is the member-elect for the 2nd district (formerly known as the 26th District) of the Ohio House of Representatives, succeeding Latyna M. Humphrey to the office on January 1, 2027. She graduated from The Ohio State University with a Bachelors of Science degree in Political Science and a Bachelors of Arts Degree in African American & African Studies. She has a Masters of Science Degree in Agricultural Communication Education and Leadership. She is a PhD Candidate in African American and African Studies at The Ohio State University. She was a Senator Ray Miller Leadership Fellow.

Charity Martin-King defeated Michael Cole in the 2026 Primary Election on May 5, 2026 by carrying 66.1% of the vote. She later won the general election on November 3, 2026 as an uncontested candidate.

Charity Martin-King is from Columbus Ohio and attended Eastmoor High School, a Columbus Public School. After high school she attended Wittenberg University and successfully ran for class president. After two years, Charity Martin King transferred from Wittenberg University to The Ohio State University where she participated in on-campus activism as a member of the African Student Union.

Her career history includes The Ohio State University Young Scholars Program, Lutheran Social Services, the Urban Minority Alcoholism and Drug Abuse (UMADAOP) Program, owner of Urban Spirit Coffee Shop and Art Gallery, Columbus City Schools, I Know I Can, the Ohio State University Department of Social Change (Student Life), the Columbus Urban League, and the National Center for Urban Solutions. She is co-founder of a non-profit organization, LEAD WITH PURPOSE. She coached basketball in Columbus City Schools (Eastmoor Academy High School) and earned several championships (city, district championships and a regional championship). She was inducted into the Jump 25 Coaches Hall of Fame.

She is a member of the National Council of Negro Women, Zeta Phi Beta Sorority, Incorporated, Women for Economic and Leadership Development (WELD), a Silver Life Member of the National Association for the Advancement of Colored People (NAACP), and a member of The Ohio State University Sphinx Society. Her global philanthropy includes building bathrooms and supporting infrastructure in Sierra Leone, West Africa.

She has received numerous awards including the Governor Ted Strickland award for Excellence in Community Education, the Citizen of the Year Award from Omega Psi Phi Fraternity, Incorporated; Eta Nu Nu Chapter, Woman of the Year by the Columbus Chapter of the National Pan-Hellenic Council, HBCU "Cousin" Award, Ohio State University Diversity Award, the Jump 25 Coaches Hall of Fame, the Zeta 100 "Activists", the Tom Joyner "Hardest Working Entrepreneur" Award, the Columbus Design Award, the Ohio State Mortar Board Award, Columbus City Schools Coach of the Year.
