= Riordan McClain =

American politician

Member of the Ohio House of Representatives from the 87th district
- Incumbent
- Assumed office January 17, 2018
- Preceded by: Wes Goodman

Personal details
- Born: October 19, 1983 (age 43) Upper Sandusky, Ohio
- Party: Republican
- Parent: Jeffrey McClain (father)
- Education: Bluffton University (BA); University of Findlay (MBA)

Riordan T. McClain (born October 19, 1983) is an American politician who has served in the Ohio House of Representatives from the 87th district since 2018.

In 2019, McClain co-sponsored legislation that would ban abortion in Ohio. Doctors who performed abortions in cases of ectopic pregnancy and other life-threatening conditions would be exempt from prosecution only if they "[took] all possible steps to preserve the life of the unborn child, while preserving the life of the woman. Such steps include, if applicable, attempting to reimplant an ectopic pregnancy into the woman's uterus". Reimplantation of an ectopic pregnancy is not a recognized or medically feasible procedure.
