= Ty Moore (politician) =

American politician

Member of the Ohio House of Representatives from the 95th district
- Incumbent
- Assumed office June 18, 2025
- Preceded by: Don Jones

Personal details
- Party: Republican
- Spouse: Terri Moore
- Children: 2
- Education: Bucknell University (BS)

Ty Moore is an American politician serving as a member of the Ohio House of Representatives for the 95th district. He was appointed to the seat in June 2025 after Don Jones resigned to become the executive director of the Ohio Farm Service Agency. Prior to his appointment, Moore served as a Noble County Commissioner and is the co-owner and vice president of R.C. Lumber Company in Caldwell.

== Committee assignments ==
As of June 2026, Moore serves on the following committees in the Ohio House.

- Agriculture
- Local Government
- Natural Resources
- Veterans and Military Development
