= Libertarian Party of Ohio =

State affiliate of the Libertarian Party

- Chairperson: Michael Sweeney
- Founded: 1972
- Headquarters: 6230 Busch Blvd, Suite 102; Columbus, Ohio 43231
- Ideology: Libertarianism
- National affiliation: Libertarian Party
- Colors: Gold
- Ohio Senate: 0 / 33
- Ohio House of Representatives: 0 / 99
- U.S. Senate (Ohio): 0 / 2
- U.S. House of Representatives (Ohio): 0 / 15
- Other elected officials: 2 (June 2024)

Website
- www.lpo.org

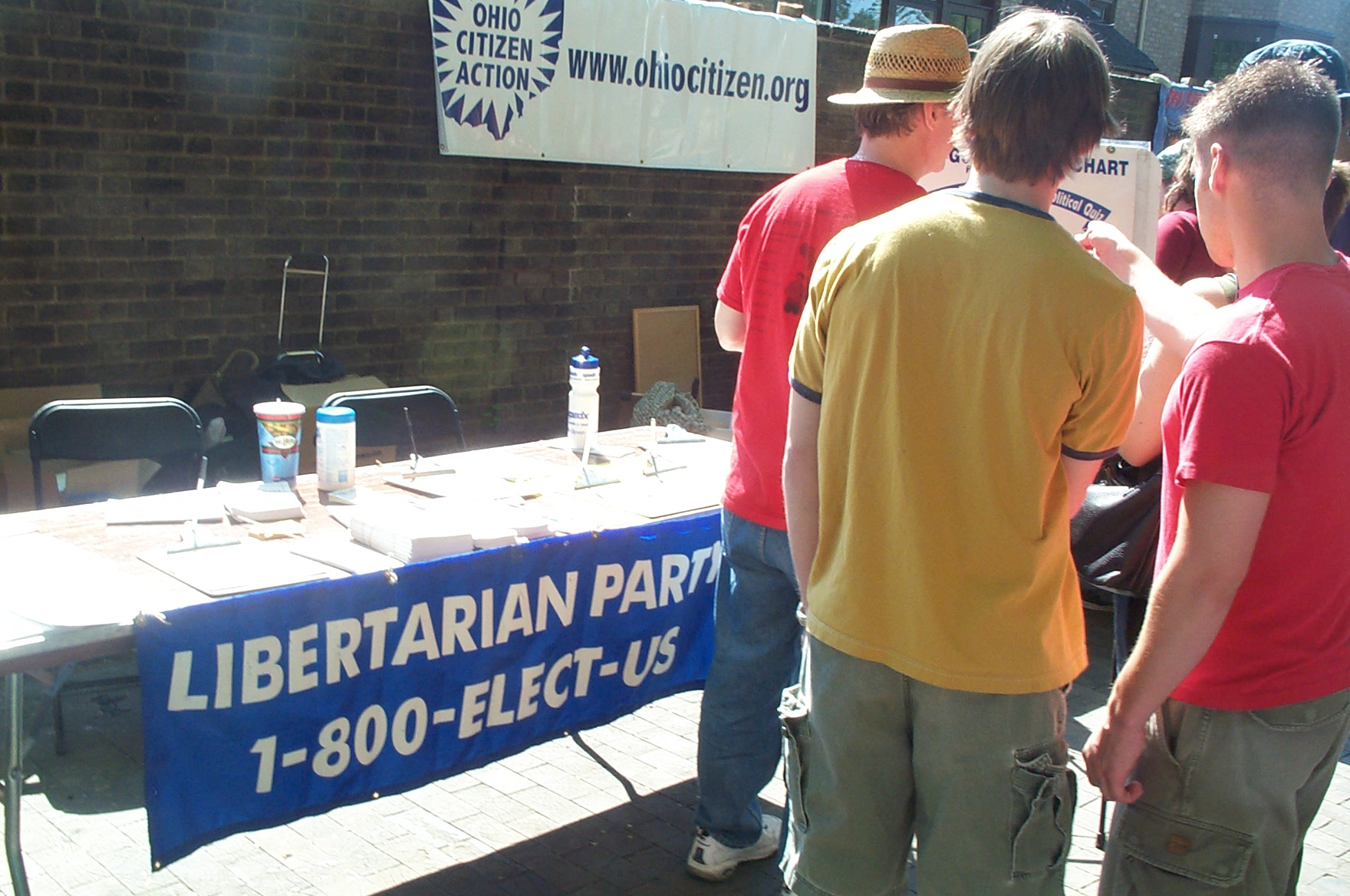
Libertarian Party campaign sign and party members in Ohio.

The Libertarian Party of Ohio (LPO) is the Ohio affiliate of the Libertarian Party. It is the fourth largest state affiliate of the Libertarian Party nationally and the third largest political party in Ohio.

== History ==
The Libertarian Party of Ohio (LPO) was the product of a women's project for limited government, organized in 1972 by Kay Harroff and fellow Randians of a chapter of Objectivists meeting regularly in Cleveland. In 1977, LPO member Elaine Lindsey won office as an independent to Circleville City Council. In 1982 LPO state chair Ann Leech achieved first ever ballot access with party brand. In its founding years, Ohio was a hotbed of Libertarian women activism. Over the years, a number of local candidates have been elected, while the Libertarian Party has been active in key issues, such as eminent domain.

In 2013, Todd Grayson was retained as City Council member for the northwest Ohio city of Perrysburg. He was at the time, and continued to be through 2016, the Vice Chairman of the Libertarian Party of Wood County. He was the first registered Libertarian in Wood County to hold office.

In 2014, the Ohio Republican Party sought ways to have the LPO removed from the ballot, including Republicans connected to then-Governor Kasich having a part in the protest of Charlie Earl's candidate petitions. This protest was based on the failure of petition circulators to satisfy a sporadically-enforced requirement to provide information about their employers. Secretary of State John Husted ruled in favor of the protest, removing Earl from the ballot. Because of a new Ohio law which required minor parties to get 3% of the vote for their gubernatorial or Presidential candidate to retain recognition, this made it impossible for the LPO to keep minor party status. The LPO responded by filing a federal lawsuit against Husted. In April 2014, the Sixth Circuit ruled that Ohio's requirement was allowable as a way to detect fraudulent signatures on candidate petitions, and denied the LPO an injunction; the U.S. Supreme Court declined to review the case in May 2014. The next year, it was revealed that the Ohio Republican Party had paid $300,000 for the legal services involved in the protest against Earl's candidacy.

On July 12, 2018, the LPO regained minor party status after submitting more than 60,000 signatures. This allowed the LPO to host primaries and lowered the required petition signatures for ballot access.

To renew the party's ballot access, the party's gubernatorial candidate was required to gain at least three percent of the vote in the Ohio gubernatorial election, 2018, which he, Travis Irvine, failed to do. After Jo Jorgensen also failed to reach 3% in 2020, the LPO lost its minor party status, leaving no recognized minor parties in Ohio.

In June 2024, the LPO again collected signatures to be recognized as a minor party. In early July, they submitted 87,000 signatures on minor party formation petitions. In August, the Secretary of State confirmed that sufficient signatures had been validated, and about fifteen candidates filed to run for Ohio offices as Libertarians, including Don Kissick for U.S. Senate and Tom Pruss for the OH-09 U.S. House seat. Media reports indicated that Pruss's candidacy likely changed the outcome of his contest, with him chosen by many voters who were dissatisfied with both major-party candidates. The Libertarian Presidential candidate, Chase Oliver, failed to reach 3% and renew their minor party status.

In 2025, the LPO announced plans to field candidates for as many Ohio offices as possible in the 2026 elections, with particular focus on the 99 elections for Ohio House of Representatives.

In 2026, two LPO candidates filed for the party's gubernatorial nomination, vital to retaining minor-party status: Don Kissick and Travis Vought (the latter as a write-in), resulting in a rare contested Libertarian primary. The LPO is also fielding candidates for Ohio Secretary of State, U.S. Senate, and various other offices. One of the two candidates for U.S. Senate was disqualified due to a protest filed by former candidate Kristen Wichers, which challenged the validity of most of Jeffrey Kanter's signatures. Wichers alleged that Kanter was a plant on behalf of the Ohio Republican Party, citing the history of Ohio Republicans "messing with" the LPO. This year also marked the first time since 2018 that Ohio voters had access to a third party in primaries as the Libertarian Party returned to the ballot after collecting signatures from 1.2% of the entire state's population.

== Ballot access litigation ==
The LPO has sued secretaries of state from both major parties and won. The first case, Libertarian Party of Ohio v. Blackwell was decided in LPO's favor on September 6, 2006 and laid the legal framework for another victory on July 17, 2008 in Libertarian Party of Ohio v. Brunner. These victories required the Ohio Secretary of State to list minor party political candidates with party affiliation on the ballot without the strict petitioning requirements of major parties. In the 2008 presidential election, this resulted in eight candidates on the ballot for president representing six political parties (along with two independents).

== See also ==
- Charlie Earl
