= Meredith Lawson-Rowe =

American politician

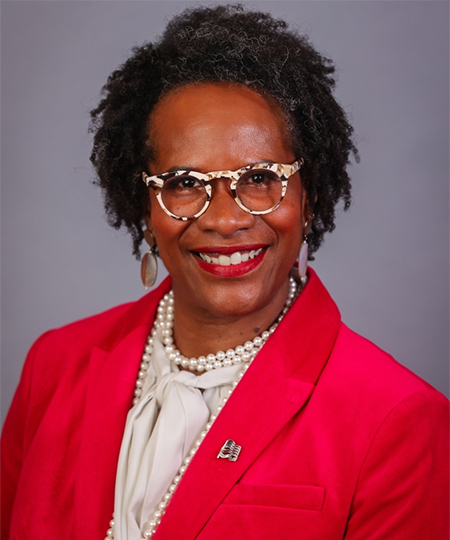

Member of the Ohio House of Representatives from the 5th district
- Incumbent
- Assumed office January 1, 2025
- Preceded by: Richard Brown

Personal details
- Party: Democratic Party
- Children: 3
- Education: Clark Atlanta University

Meredith Lawson-Rowe is an American politician and community activist who is a Democratic member of the Ohio House of Representatives representing the 5th district, first elected unopposed in 2024. The district includes parts of Obetz, Columbus, Groveport, Blacklick Estates, Canal Winchester, and Reynoldsburg.

Lawson-Rowe formerly served as a member of the Reynoldsburg City Council and was notable for being one of the first black women elected to city council in 2019. She was also involved in the founding of Juneteenth celebrations in Reynoldsburg.
