= Ron Ferguson (politician) =

American politician (born 1986)

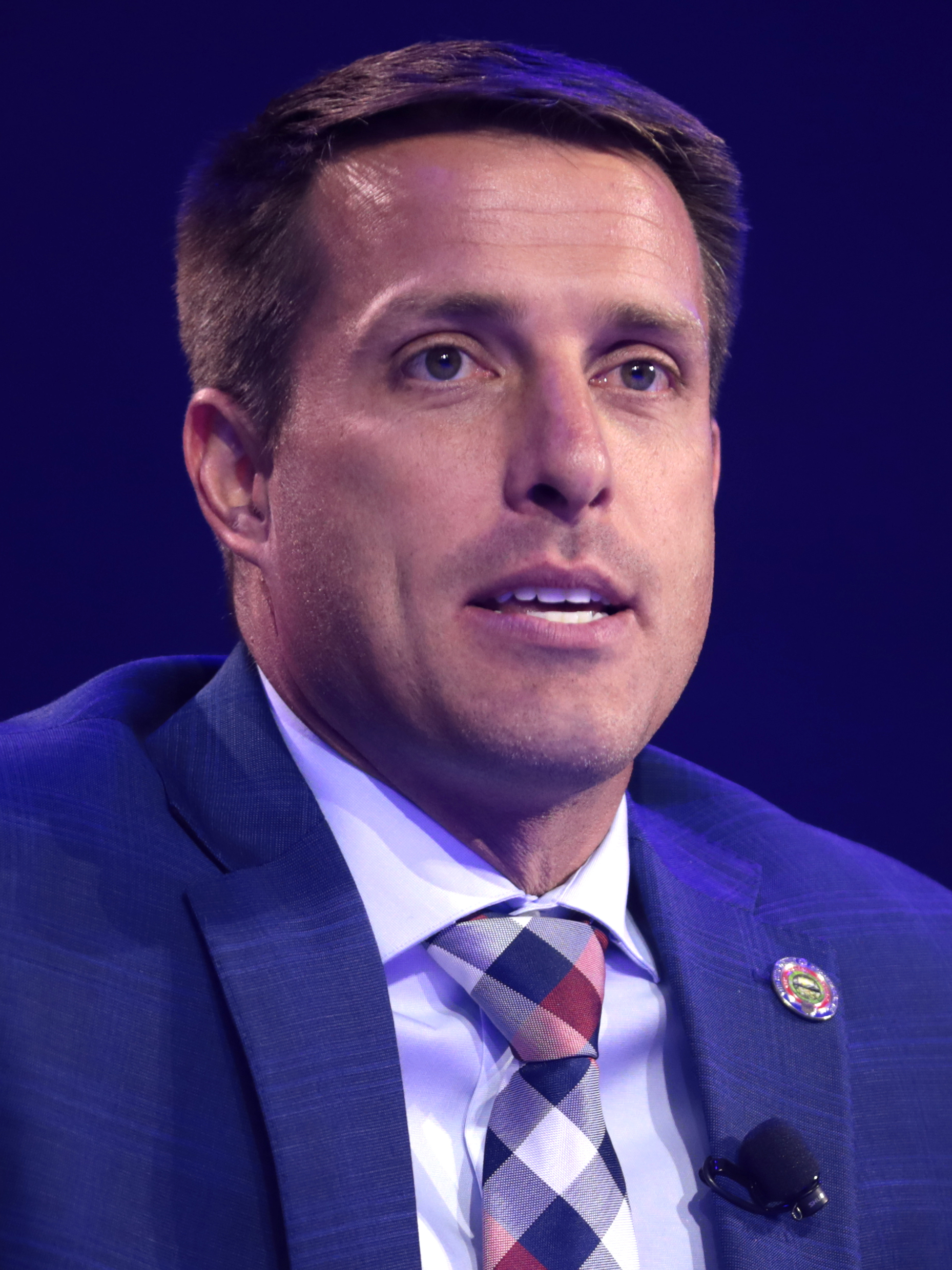

Member of the Ohio House of Representatives from the 96th district
- Incumbent
- Assumed office January 1, 2021
- Preceded by: Jack Cera

Personal details
- Born: 1986 (age 38–39) Wintersville, Ohio, U.S.
- Party: Republican
- Education: Ohio State University (BA)

Ron Ferguson (born 1986) is an American politician who is currently the Ohio state representative in Ohio's 96th district. He won the seat after incumbent Democrat Jack Cera became term–limited after completing his fourth term in 2020. He defeated Democrat Richard Olivito and Libertarian Oscar Herrera in 2020, winning 66.4% to 30.4% to 3.2%, thus flipping the district from Democratic to Republican.

Ferguson previously ran for this seat in 2014, but lost to Cera.
