= Mike Baker (Ohio politician) =

American politician

Member-elect of the Ohio House of Representatives from the 52nd district
- Assuming office January 1, 2027
- Succeeding: Gayle Manning

Personal details
- Born: Elyria, Ohio
- Party: Democratic
- Spouse: Allison Baker
- Children: 4
- Education: ITT Technical Institute (2006)
- Website: Official website

Mike Baker is an American politician who is the member-elect for the 52nd district of the Ohio House of Representatives, succeeding to the office on January 1, 2027. A Democrat, Baker was elected in the 2026 election, succeeding incumbent Republican Gayle Manning.

== Early life and Education ==
Baker was born in 1985 or 1986. He graduated from Midview High School, then received an Associate degree in applied science in multimedia from ITT Technical Institute in 2006.

== Personal Life ==
Mike is married to his wife Allison, they have 4 children together. Prior to being elected to the state house, Baker was a small busisness owner who founded First Choice Photography.

== Election History ==
2026 Ohio House 52nd district election
Party	Candidate	Votes	%
Democratic	Mike Baker	28,230	54.86
Republican	Cliff Winkel	23,228	45.14
Total votes		51,548	100.0
