= Brian Lorenz =

American politician (born 1973)

- Lorenz in 2026

Member of the Ohio House of Representatives from the 60th district
- Incumbent
- Assumed office May 14, 2023
- Preceded by: Kris Jordan

Personal details
- Born: January 26, 1973 (age 53) Mansfield, Ohio, U.S.
- Party: Republican
- Spouse: Sue
- Children: 4
- Education: University of Toledo (BA); Ohio State University (MA)

Brian Lorenz (born January 26, 1973) is an American politician and former municipal official serving as a member of the Ohio House of Representatives from the 60th district since 2023. A Republican, he was appointed to the House in 2023 following the death of representative Kris Jordan and was elected to a full term in 2024. Lorenz previously served on the Powell City Council from 2010 to 2023 and as mayor of Powell from 2016 to 2017.

== Early life and education ==
Lorenz was born in Mansfield, Ohio, and graduated from Lexington High School in 1991. He graduated from the University of Toledo in 1996 with a bachelor's degree in geography and planning. In 1999, he earned a master's degree in city and regional planning from Ohio State University.

== Local government career ==
Lorenz worked professionally as a city and regional planner before joining the Ohio House of Representatives.

He was elected to the Powell City Council in 2010 and served on the council until his appointment to the Ohio House in 2023. Lorenz served as mayor of Powell from 2016 to 2017.

In addition to his elected service, Lorenz represented Powell as a member of the Powell Community Improvement Corporation and served for six years on the city's Planning and Zoning Commission.

== Ohio House of Representatives ==
=== Appointment ===
Lorenz sought appointment to the 60th district seat in the Ohio House of Representatives following the death of incumbent Representative Kris Jordan in February 2023. House Republicans selected Lorenz to fill the vacancy, and he was sworn into office in May 2023.

Lorenz had previously challenged Jordan in the Republican primary for the Ohio House in 2018, but lost the nomination to Jordan.

=== Elections ===
Lorenz was elected to a full term in the November 2024 general election, defeating Democratic nominee Rachael Morocco.

==== 2024 general election ====
Ohio House of Representatives District 60 general election, 2024
Party	Candidate	Votes	%
Republican	Brian Lorenz	37,345	54.3
Democratic	Rachael Morocco	31,492	45.7
Total votes		68,837	100.0

=== Committee assignments ===
During the 136th Ohio General Assembly, Lorenz serves as vice chair of the House Development Committee. He also serves on the House Energy, Insurance, and Transportation committees.

=== Legislative activity ===
Lorenz has sponsored legislation addressing property taxation, local government, economic development, health care, transportation, regulatory policy, and other issues.

During the 136th General Assembly, Lorenz co-sponsored legislation to establish a statewide universal regulatory sandbox program, which passed the Ohio House of Representatives in March 2026. He has also sponsored legislation to increase the standard homestead exemption and legislation providing a temporary property tax credit for certain homesteads.

== Personal life ==
Lorenz and his wife, Sue, have four children. He has been involved with several community organizations in Delaware County, including the Knights of Columbus and the YMCA.
