= Ohio Education Association =

Teachers' union in Ohio

The Ohio Education Association (OEA) is a teachers' union which serves as the largest such organization for educators in the American state of Ohio. The organization represents teachers, educational support professionals, counselors, curriculum specialists, librarians, health care workers, school nurses, school psychologists, vocational-technical instructors, higher education students and retirees in Ohio. As of 2018, it had 125,000 members. It serves as Ohio's branch organization for the National Education Association and mainly serves the smaller cities in the state and Columbus, with the Ohio Federation of Teachers (representing the American Federation of Teachers) serving Cincinnati and Cleveland's city school districts, among others.

OEA represents the labor, policy, and professional interests of its members. OEA bargains compensation and benefits, protects members’ rights, and advocates for their professions. As of 2025, the OEA President is Jeff Wensing, the Vice President is Dan Greenburg, and the Secretary-Treasurer is Rob McFee.
