= Ohio's 10th House of Representatives district =

American legislative district

Ohio's 10th State House of Representatives district
Representative
Mark Sigrist; D–Grove City
- Population (2020): 118,982

Ohio's 10th House of Representatives district is currently represented by Democrat Mark Sigrist since 2025. It was previously represented by Republican David Dobos. It is located entirely within Franklin County and includes the city of Grove City and parts of Columbus, as well as parts of Franklin and Jackson Townships.

== List of members representing the district ==
Member	Party	Years	General Assembly	Electoral history
District established January 2, 1967.
Herman Ankeney (Xenia)	Republican	January 2, 1967 – March 6, 1968	107th	Elected in 1966. Died.
Vacant		March 6, 1968 – January 7, 1969	107th	
John Scott (Beavercreek)	Republican	January 6, 1969 – December 31, 1972	108th 109th	Elected in 1968. Re-elected in 1970. Redistricted to the 63rd district.
Thomas M. Bell (Cleveland)	Democratic	January 1, 1973 – December 31, 1982	110th 111th 112th 113th 114th	Elected in 1972. Re-elected in 1974. Re-elected in 1976. Re-elected in 1978. Re-elected in 1980. Retired.
June Kreuzer (Parma)	Democratic	January 3, 1983 – December 31, 1986	115th 116th	Elected in 1982. Re-elected in 1984. Lost re-nomination.
Ronald M. Mottl (North Royalton)	Democratic	January 5, 1987 – December 31, 1992	117th 118th 119th	Elected in 1986. Re-elected in 1988. Re-elected in 1990. Redistricted to the 20th district.
Troy Lee James (Cleveland)	Democratic	January 4, 1993 – December 31, 2000	120th 121st 122nd 123rd	Redistricted from the 12th district and re-elected in 1992. Re-elected in 1994. Re-elected in 1996. Re-elected in 1998. Term-limited.
Annie L. Key (Cleveland)	Democratic	January 1, 2001 – December 31, 2002	124th	Elected in 2000. Redistricted to the 11th district.
Shirley Smith (Cleveland)	Democratic	January 6, 2003 – December 31, 2006	125th 126th	Redistricted from the 8th district and re-elected in 2002. Re-elected in 2004. Retired to run for state senator.
Eugene Miller (Cleveland)	Democratic	January 1, 2007 – May 4, 2009	127th 128th	Elected in 2006. Re-elected in 2008. Resigned to become Cleveland City councillor.
Vacant		May 4, 2009 – May 27, 2009	128th	
Robin Belcher (Cleveland)	Democratic	May 27, 2009 – December 31, 2010	128th	Appointed to finish Miller's term. Lost re-nomination.
Bill Patmon (Cleveland)	Democratic	January 3, 2011 – December 31, 2018	129th 130th 131st 132nd	Elected in 2010. Re-elected in 2012. Re-elected in 2014. Re-elected in 2016. Term-limited.
Terrence Upchurch (Cleveland)	Democratic	January 7, 2019 – December 31, 2022	133rd 134th	Elected in 2018. Re-elected in 2020. Redistricted to the 20th district.
David Dobos (Columbus)	Republican	January 2, 2023 – present	135th	Elected in 2022.
Mark Sigrist	Democratic	January 1, 2025 – present	136th	Elected in 2024.
