= Ohio's 99th House of Representatives district =

American legislative district

Ohio's 99th State House of Representatives district
Representative
Sarah Fowler Arthur; R–Geneva-on-the-Lake
- Population (2020): 124,572

Ohio's 99th House of Representatives district is one of 99 districts in the Ohio House of Representatives. The district contains portions of Ashtabula and Geauga counties. It is currently represented by Republican Sarah Fowler Arthur.

== List of members representing the district ==
Member	Party	Years	General Assembly	Electoral history
District established January 2, 1967.
James B. Hagan (Liberty Township)	Democratic	January 2, 1967 – December 31, 1968	107th	Elected in 1966. Retired.
Michael Del Bane (Hubbard)	Democratic	January 3, 1969 – December 31, 1972	108th 109th	Elected in 1968. Re-elected in 1970. Redistricted to the 56th district.
A. G. Lancione (Bellaire)	Democratic	January 1, 1973 – December 31, 1978	110th 111th 112th	Redistricted from the 30th district and re-elected in 1972. Re-elected in 1974. Re-elected in 1976. Retired.
Wayne Hays (Belmont)	Democratic	January 1, 1979 – December 31, 1980	113th	Elected in 1978. Lost re-election.
Bob Ney (St. Clairsville)	Republican	January 3, 1981 – December 31, 1982	114th	Elected in 1980. Lost re-election.
Jack Cera; Bellaire	Democratic	January 3, 1983 – December 31, 1996	115th 116th 117th 118th 119th 120th 121st	Elected in 1982. Re-elected in 1984. Re-elected in 1986. Re-elected in 1988. Re-elected in 1990. Re-elected in 1992. Re-elected in 1994. Ran for Ohio Senate
Charlie Wilson (Bridgeport)	Democratic	January 3, 1997 – January 3, 2003	122nd 123rd 124th	Elected in 1996. Re-elected in 1998. Re-elected in 2000. Redistricted to the 96th district.
George Distel (Conneaut)	Democratic	January 7, 2003 – March 31, 2008	125th 126th 127th	Redistricted from the 5th district and re-elected in 2002. Re-elected in 2004. Re-elected in 2006. Resigned to become Executive Director of the Ohio Turnpike Commission
Vacant		March 31, 2008 – May 21, 2008	127th	
Deborah Newcomb (Conneaut)	Democratic	May 21, 2008 – December 31, 2010	127th 128th	Appointed to finish Distel's term. Re-elected in 2008. Lost re-election.
Casey Kozlowski (Ashtabula)	Republican	January 3, 2011 – December 31, 2012	129th	Elected in 2010. Lost re-election.
John Patterson (Jefferson)	Democratic	January 7, 2013 – December 31, 2020	130th 131st 132nd 133rd	Elected in 2012. Re-elected in 2014. Re-elected in 2016. Re-elected in 2018. Term-limited.
Sarah Fowler Arthur (Geneva-on-the-Lake)	Republican	January 4, 2021 – present	134th 135th 136th	Elected in 2020. Re-elected in 2022. Re-elected in 2024.

== Election results ==
=== 2026 ===
Republican primary
Party	Candidate	Votes	%
Republican	Sarah Fowler Arthur	10,657	100.0%
Total votes		10,657	100.0%

Democratic primary
Party	Candidate	Votes	%
Democratic	Louis Murphy	3,604	57.1%
Democratic	Michael Price	2,712	42.9%
Total votes		6,316	100.0%

=== 2024 ===
Republican primary
Party	Candidate	Votes	%
Republican	Sarah Fowler Arthur	12,291	100.0%
Total votes		12,291	100.0%

Democratic primary
Party	Candidate	Votes	%
Democratic	Louis Murphy	4,446	100.0%
Total votes		4,446	100.0%

Ohio's 99th House District 2024 General Election
Party	Candidate	Votes	%
Republican	Sarah Fowler Arthur	38,184	64.5%
Democratic	Louis Murphy	20,986	35.5%
Total votes		59,170	100.0%
Republican hold			

=== 2022 ===
Republican primary
Party	Candidate	Votes	%
Republican	Sarah Fowler Arthur	3,184	100.0%
Total votes		3,184	100.0%

Democratic primary
Party	Candidate	Votes	%
Democratic	Abby Kovacs (Note: Withdrew after primary)	1,943	100.0%
Total votes		1,943	100.0%

Ohio's 99th House District 2022 General Election
Party	Candidate	Votes	%
Republican	Sarah Fowler Arthur	29,096	60.4%
Democratic	Kathy Zappitello	19,082	39.6%
Total votes		48,178	100.0%
Republican hold			

=== 2020 ===
Republican primary
Party	Candidate	Votes	%
Republican	Sarah Fowler Arthur	7,413	100.0%
Total votes		7,413	100.0%

Democratic primary
Party	Candidate	Votes	%
Democratic	Richard Dana	5,836	100.0%
Total votes		5,836	100.0%

Ohio's 99th House District 2020 General Election
Party	Candidate	Votes	%
Republican	Sarah Fowler Arthur	28,918	58.5%
Democratic	Richard Dana	20,356	41.2%
Write-in	Kyle Bruckman	150	0.3%
Total votes		49,424	100.0%
Republican gain from Democratic			

=== 2018 ===
Democratic primary
Party	Candidate	Votes	%
Democratic	John Patterson	5,668	100.0%
Total votes		5,668	100.0%

Republican primary
Party	Candidate	Votes	%
Republican	Michael Pircio	6,672	100.0%
Total votes		6,672	100.0%

Ohio's 99th House District 2018 General Election
Party	Candidate	Votes	%
Democratic	John Patterson	19,755	53.1%
Republican	Michael Pircio	17,435	46.9%
Total votes		37,190	100.0%
Democratic hold			

=== 2016 ===
Ohio's 99th House District 2016 General Election
Party	Candidate	Votes	%
Democratic	John Patterson	8,507	100.0%
Total votes		8,507	100.0%
Democratic hold			

=== 2014 ===
Ohio's 99th House District 2014 General Election
Party	Candidate	Votes	%
Democratic	John Patterson	17,452	57.9%
Republican	Nancy McArthur	12,704	42.1%
Total votes		30,156	100.0%
Democratic hold			

=== 2012 ===
Ohio's 99th House District 2012 General Election
Party	Candidate	Votes	%
Democratic	John Patterson	25,230	53.0%
Republican	Casey Kozlowski	22,395	47.0%
Total votes		47,625	100.0%
Democratic gain from Republican			

=== 2010 ===
Democratic primary
Party	Candidate	Votes	%
Democratic	Deborah Newcomb	6,355	100.0%
Total votes		6,355	100.0%

Republican primary
Party	Candidate	Votes	%
Republican	Casey Kozlowski	2,030	31.4%
Republican	Ryan Bailey	1,259	19.5%
Republican	Robert Tarasiak	1,221	18.9%
Republican	Jason Shippy	1,052	16.3%
Republican	Tim Byers	903	13.9%
Total votes		6,465	100.0%

Ohio's 99th House District 2010 General Election
Party	Candidate	Votes	%
Republican	Casey Kozlowski	13,040	40.9%
Democratic	Deborah Newcomb	12,997	40.8%
Independent	Tammy Roesch	5,846	18.3%
Total votes		31,883	100.0%
Republican gain from Democratic			
