= Ohio's 6th House of Representatives district =

American legislative district

Ohio's 6th State House of Representatives district
Representative
| Christine Cockley; D–Columbus |
- Population (2020): 116,844

Ohio's 6th House of Representatives district is currently represented by Democrat Christine Cockley. It is located entirely within Franklin County and includes parts of Columbus, as well as parts of Franklin and Prairie Townships.

== List of members representing the district ==
| Member | Party | Years | General Assembly | Electoral history |
|---|---|---|---|---|
District established January 2, 1967.
| Walter L. White (Lima) | Republican | January 2, 1967 – December 31, 1972 | 107th 108th 109th | Elected in 1966. Re-elected in 1968. Re-elected in 1970. Retired to run for state senator. |
| Patrick Sweeney (Cleveland) | Democratic | January 7, 1973 – December 31, 1982 | 110th 111th 112th 113th 114th | Redistricted from the 47th district and re-elected in 1972. Re-elected in 1974. Re-elected in 1976. Re-elected in 1978. Re-elected in 1980. Redistricted to the 9th district. |
| Jeff Jacobs (Bay Village) | Republican | January 3, 1983 – December 31, 1986 | 115th 116th | Elected in 1982. Re-elected in 1984. Retired to run for Ohio State Treasurer. |
| Jim Petro (Rocky River) | Republican | January 5, 1987 – December 31, 1990 | 117th 118th | Elected in 1986. Re-elected in 1988. Retired to run for Ohio State Auditor. |
| Ed Kasputis (Olmsted Township) | Republican | January 7, 1991 – December 31, 1992 | 119th | Elected in 1990. Redistricted to the 16th district. |
| Jon D. Myers (Lancaster) | Republican | January 4, 1993 – December 31, 2000 | 120th 121st 122nd 123rd | Redistricted from the 78th district and re-elected in 1992. Re-elected in 1994. Re-elected in 1996. Re-elected in 1998. Term-limited. |
| Tim Schaffer (Lancaster) | Republican | January 1, 2001 – December 31, 2002 | 124th | Elected in 2000. Redistricted to the 5th district. |
| Bob Latta (Bowling Green) | Republican | January 6, 2003 – December 13, 2007 | 125th 126th 127th | Redistricted from the 4th district and re-elected in 2002. Re-elected in 2004. Re-elected in 2006. Resigned to become U.S. Representative. |
| Vacant | | December 13, 2007 – January 9, 2008 | 127th | |
| Randy Gardner (Bowling Green) | Republican | January 9, 2008 – December 31, 2012 | 127th 128th 129th | Appointed to finish Latta's term. Re-elected in 2008. Re-elected in 2010. Retired to run for state senator. |
| Marlene Anielski (Walton Hills) | Republican | January 7, 2013 – December 31, 2018 | 130th 131st 132nd | Redistricted from the 17th district and re-elected in 2012. Re-elected in 2014. Re-elected in 2016. Term-limited. |
| Phil Robinson (Cleveland) | Democratic | January 7, 2019 – December 31, 2022 | 133rd 134th | Elected in 2018. Re-elected in 2020. Redistricted to the 19th district. |
| Adam Miller (Columbus) | Democratic | January 2, 2023 – January 5th, 2025 | 135th | Redistricted from the 17th district and re-elected in 2022. |
| Christine Cockley (Columbus) | Democratic | January 6, 2025 – present | 136th | Elected in 2024. |
