= Ohio's 5th House of Representatives district =

American legislative district

Ohio's 5th State House of Representatives district
Representative
Richard Brown; D–Columbus
- Population (2020): 116,055

Ohio's 5th House of Representatives district is currently represented by Democrat Richard Brown. It is located entirely within Franklin County and includes the cities of Canal Winchester, Groveport, Obetz, Reynoldsburg, and parts of Columbus, as well as Hamilton, Pleasant, Prairie, Madison, and part of Jackson Township.

== List of members representing the district ==
Member	Party	Years	General Assembly	Electoral history
District established January 2, 1967.
Ralph Cole (Findlay)	Republican	January 2, 1967 – December 31, 1968	107th	Elected in 1966. Retired to run for Sixth District Court of Appeals judge.
Robert D. Schuck (Findlay)	Republican	January 6, 1969 – December 31, 1972	108th 109th	Elected in 1968. Re-elected in 1970. Redistricted to the 82nd district and lost re-nomination.
Dick Celeste (Cleveland)	Democratic	January 7, 1973 – December 31, 1974	110th	Redistricted from the 49th district and re-elected in 1972. Retired to run for Lieutenant Governor of Ohio.
Francine Panehal (Cleveland)	Democratic	January 6, 1975 – December 31, 1982	111th 112th 113th 114th	Elected in 1974. Re-elected in 1976. Re-elected in 1978. Re-elected in 1980. Redistricted to the 8th district.
Robert Brown (Perrysburg)	Republican	January 3, 1983 – November 15, 1985	115th 116th	Redistricted from the 83rd district and re-elected in 1982. Re-elected in 1984. Resigned to become Director of the Ohio Department of Mental Retardation and Developmental Disabilities.
Randy Gardner (Bowling Green)	Republican	November 15, 1985 – December 31, 1992	116th 117th 118th 119th	Appointed to finish Brown's term. Re-elected in 1986. Re-elected in 1988. Re-elected in 1990. Redistricted to the 4th district.
Ross Boggs (Andover)	Democratic	January 4, 1993 – March 1, 1999	120th 121st 122nd 123rd	Redistricted from the 2nd district and re-elected in 1992. Re-elected in 1994. Re-elected in 1996. Re-elected in 1998. Resigned to serve on the Unemployment Compensation Board of Review.
George Distel (Conneaut)	Democratic	March 1, 1999 – December 31, 2002	123rd 124th	Appointed to finish Boggs' term. Re-elected in 2000. Redistricted to the 99th district.
Tim Schaffer (Lancaster)	Republican	January 6, 2003 – December 31, 2006	125th 126th	Redistricted from the 6th district and re-elected in 2002. Re-elected in 2004. Retired to run for state senator.
Gerald Stebelton (Lancaster)	Republican	January 1, 2007 – December 31, 2012	127th 128th 129th	Elected in 2006. Re-elected in 2008. Re-elected in 2010. Redistricted to the 77th district.
Nick Barborak (Lisbon)	Democratic	January 7, 2013 – December 31, 2014	130th	Elected in 2012. Lost re-election.
Tim Ginter (Salem)	Republican	January 5, 2015 – December 31, 2022	131st 132nd 133rd 134th	Elected in 2014. Re-elected in 2016. Re-elected in 2018. Re-elected in 2020. Term-limited.
Richard Brown (Canal Winchester)	Democratic	January 2, 2023 – present	135th	Redistricted from the 20th district and re-elected in 2022.
