= 2018 Ohio House of Representatives election =

- November 6, 2018

All 99 seats of the Ohio House of Representatives 50 seats are needed for a majority
- Turnout: 54.30%

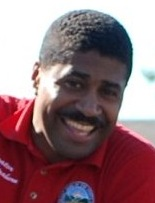
	Majority party	Minority party
Leader	Ryan Smith	Fred Strahorn
Party	Republican	Democratic
Leader since	June 6, 2018	January 5, 2015
Leader's seat	District 93	District 39
Last election	66	33
Seats won	61	38
Seat change	▼5	▲5
Popular vote	2,166,790	1,992,886
Percentage	51.96%	47.79%
Swing	▼6.58%	▲7.32%
- Results; Democratic hold Democratic gain Republican hold Republican gain
Speaker before election
Ryan Smith
Republican
Elected Speaker
Larry Householder
Republican

An election was held on November 6, 2018, to elect all 99 members to Ohio's House of Representatives. The election coincided with the elections for other offices, including U.S. Senate, U.S. House of Representatives, state governor and state senate. The primary election was held on May 8, 2018.

Republicans retained a supermajority in the House despite a net loss of five seats, winning 61 seats compared to 38 seats for the Democrats.

== Statewide results ==
Party	Candi- dates	Votes			Seats		
Party	Candi- dates	No.	%	+/–	No.	+/–	%
Republican Party	91	2,166,790	51.96%	-6.58%	62	▼4	62.63%
Democratic Party	99	1,992,886	47.79%	+7.32%	37	▲4	37.37%
Libertarian Party	6	7,599	0.18%	New	0	Steady	0.00%
Green Party	2*	2,809	0.07%	-0.01%	0	Steady	0.00%
Write-in	2*	204	0.00%	±0.00%	0	Steady	0.00%
Total	200	4,170,288	100.00%		99	Steady	100.00%

- Write-in candidate for House District 75 was also a Green Party candidate, but labeled as write-in.

Popular vote
Republican	51.96%
Democratic	47.79%
Other	0.25%

House seats
Republican	61.62%
Democratic	38.38%

== Predictions ==
Source	Ranking	As of
Governing	Likely R	October 8, 2018

== Results by district ==
=== Overview ===
Results of the 2018 Ohio House election
District	Incumbent status	Incumbent	Winner	Result
1st	Running	Scott Wiggam		Incumbent Republican re-elected
2nd	Running	Mark Romanchuk		Incumbent Republican re-elected
3rd	Running	Theresa Gavarone		Incumbent Republican re-elected
4th	Running	Robert Cupp		Incumbent Republican re-elected
5th	Running	Tim Ginter		Incumbent Republican re-elected
6th	Term-limited	Marlene Anielski	Phil Robinson	Democratic gain
7th	Running	Tom Patton		Incumbent Republican re-elected
8th	Running	Kent Smith		Incumbent Democrat re-elected
9th	Running	Janine Boyd		Incumbent Democrat re-elected
10th	Term-limited	Bill Patmon	Terrence Upchurch	Democratic hold
11th	Running	Stephanie Howse		Incumbent Democrat re-elected
12th	Term-limited	John Barnes	Juanita Brent	Democratic hold
13th	Term-limited	Nickie Antonio	Michael Skindell	Democratic hold
14th	Not running (Note: Running for Ohio Senate District 23. (Defeated in primary.))	Martin Sweeney	Bride Rose Sweeney	Democratic hold
15th	Not running	Nicholas Celebrezze	Jeffrey Crossman	Democratic hold
16th	Running	David Greenspan		Incumbent Republican re-elected
17th	Running	Adam Miller		Incumbent Democrat re-elected
18th	Running	Kristin Boggs		Incumbent Democrat re-elected
19th	Term-limited	Anne Gonzales	Mary Lightbody	Democratic gain
20th	Running	Richard Brown		Incumbent Democrat re-elected
21st	Term-limited	Mike Duffey	Beth Liston	Democratic gain
22nd	Running	David Leland		Incumbent Democrat re-elected
23rd	Running	Laura Lanese		Incumbent Republican re-elected
24th	Not running (Note: Running for a seat on the Franklin County Court of Common Pleas.)	Jim Hughes	Allison Russo	Democratic gain
25th	Running	Bernadine Kent		Incumbent Democrat re-elected
26th	Not running (Note: Running for Ohio Senate District 15.)	Hearcel Craig	Erica Crawley	Democratic hold
27th	Running	Tom Brinkman		Incumbent Republican re-elected
28th	Running	Jonathan Dever	Jessica Miranda	Democratic gain
29th	Running	Louis Blessing		Incumbent Republican re-elected
30th	Running	Bill Seitz		Incumbent Republican re-elected
31st	Running	Brigid Kelly		Incumbent Democrat re-elected
32nd	Running	Catherine Ingram		Incumbent Democrat re-elected
33rd	Term-limited	Alicia Reece	Sedrick Denson	Democratic hold
34th	Running	Emilia Sykes		Incumbent Democrat re-elected
35th	Running	Tavia Galonski		Incumbent Democrat re-elected
36th	Running	Anthony DeVitis		Incumbent Republican re-elected
37th	Term-limited	Kristina Roegner	Casey Weinstein	Democratic gain
38th	Not running	Marilyn Slaby	Bill Roemer	Republican hold
39th	Running	Fred Strahorn		Incumbent Democrat re-elected
40th	Term-limited	Michael Henne	Phil Plummer	Republican hold
41st	Running	Jim Butler		Incumbent Republican re-elected
42nd	Running	Niraj Antani		Incumbent Republican re-elected
43rd	Running	Jeffery Todd Smith		Incumbent Republican re-elected
44th	Term-limited	Michael Ashford	Paula Hicks-Hudson	Democratic hold
45th	Term-limited	Teresa Fedor	Lisa Sobecki	Democratic hold
46th	Running	Michael Sheehy		Incumbent Democrat re-elected
47th	Running	Derek Merrin		Incumbent Republican re-elected
48th	Term-limited	Kirk Schuring	Scott Oelslager	Republican hold
49th	Running	Tom West		Incumbent Democrat re-elected
50th	Term-limited	Christina Hagan	Reggie Stoltzfus	Republican hold
51st	Running (Note: Retherford filed for re-election, but was defeated in the Republican primary by Sara Carruthers.)	Wes Retherford	Sara Carruthers	Republican hold
52nd	Running	George Lang		Incumbent Republican re-elected
53rd	Running	Candice Keller		Incumbent Republican re-elected
54th	Running	Paul Zeltwanger		Incumbent Republican re-elected
55th	Not running (Note: Running for Ohio Senate District 13.)	Nathan Manning	Gayle Manning	Republican hold
56th	Term-limited	Dan Ramos	Joe Miller	Democratic hold
57th	Running	Dick Stein		Incumbent Republican re-elected
58th	Running	Michele Lepore-Hagan		Incumbent Democrat re-elected
59th	Not running (Note: Running for Ohio Senate District 33.)	John Boccieri	Don Manning	Republican gain
60th	Running	John Rogers		Incumbent Democrat re-elected
61st	Term-limited	Ron Young	Jamie Callender	Republican hold
62nd	Running	Scott Lipps		Incumbent Republican re-elected
63rd	Running	Glenn Holmes		Incumbent Democrat re-elected
64th	Running	Michael O'Brien		Incumbent Democrat re-elected
65th	Running	John Becker		Incumbent Republican re-elected
66th	Running	Doug Green		Incumbent Republican re-elected
67th	Term-limited	Andrew Brenner	Kris Jordan	Republican hold
68th	Running	Rick Carfagna		Incumbent Republican re-elected
69th	Running	Steve Hambley		Incumbent Republican re-elected
70th	Running	Darrell Kick		Incumbent Republican re-elected
71st	Running	Scott Ryan		Incumbent Republican re-elected
72nd	Running	Larry Householder		Incumbent Republican re-elected
73rd	Running	Rick Perales		Incumbent Republican re-elected
74th	Running	Bill Dean		Incumbent Republican re-elected
75th	Term-limited	Kathleen Clyde	Randi Clites	Democratic hold
76th	Running	Sarah LaTourette		Incumbent Republican re-elected
77th	Running	Tim Schaffer		Incumbent Republican re-elected
78th	Running	Ron Hood		Incumbent Republican re-elected
79th	Running	Kyle Koehler		Incumbent Republican re-elected
80th	Not running (Note: Running for Ohio Senate District 5.)	Steve Huffman	Jena Powell	Republican hold
81st	Running	Jim Hoops		Incumbent Republican re-elected
82nd	Running	Craig Riedel		Incumbent Republican re-elected
83rd	Term-limited	Robert Sprague	Jon Cross	Republican hold
84th	Not running (Note: Running for Ohio State Auditor.)	Keith Faber	Susan Manchester	Republican hold
85th	Running	Nino Vitale		Incumbent Republican re-elected
86th	Term-limited	Dorothy Pelanda	Tracy Richardson	Republican hold
87th	Running	Riordan McClain		Incumbent Republican re-elected
88th	Running	Bill Reineke		Incumbent Republican re-elected
89th	Running	Steve Arndt		Incumbent Republican re-elected
90th	Term-limited	Terry Johnson	Brian Baldridge	Republican hold
91st	Running	Shane Wilkin		Incumbent Republican re-elected
92nd	Running	Gary Scherer		Incumbent Republican re-elected
93rd	Running	Ryan Smith		Incumbent Republican re-elected
94th	Running	Jay Edwards		Incumbent Republican re-elected
95th	Term-limited	Andy Thompson	Don Jones	Republican hold
96th	Running	Jack Cera		Incumbent Democrat re-elected
97th	Running	Brian Hill		Incumbent Republican re-elected
98th	Term-limited	Al Landis	Brett Hillyer	Republican hold
99th	Running	John Patterson		Incumbent Democrat re-elected

=== Detailed results ===
Results of the 2018 Ohio House of Representatives election by district:

District	Democratic		Republican		Others		Total		Result
District	Votes	%	Votes	%	Votes	%	Votes	%	Result
District 1	11,440	29.38%	25,802	66.27%	1,693	4.35%	38,935	100.00%	Republican hold
District 2	12,977	29.95%	29,311	67.64%	1,043	2.41%	43,331	100.00%	Republican hold
District 3	18,058	37.76%	29,759	62.24%	-	-	47,817	100.00%	Republican hold
District 4	9,438	26.92%	25,620	73.08%	-	-	35,058	100.00%	Republican hold
District 5	10,465	29.75%	24,711	70.25%	-	-	35,176	100.00%	Republican hold
District 6	30,334	51.14%	28,985	48.86%	-	-	59,319	100.00%	Democratic gain
District 7	18,764	39.18%	29,133	60.82%	-	-	47,897	100.00%	Republican hold
District 8	35,115	100.00%	-	-	-	-	35,115	100.00%	Democratic hold
District 9	42,634	87.85%	5,897	12.15%	-	-	48,531	100.00%	Democratic hold
District 10	23,817	100.00%	-	-	-	-	23,817	100.00%	Democratic hold
District 11	24,085	86.69%	3,698	13.31%	-	-	27,783	100.00%	Democratic hold
District 12	33,659	100.00%	-	-	-	-	33,659	100.00%	Democratic hold
District 13	26,735	77.96%	7,558	22.04%	-	-	34,293	100.00%	Democratic hold
District 14	22,943	71.83%	8,998	28.17%	-	-	31,941	100.00%	Democratic hold
District 15	18,835	56.22%	14,670	43.78%	-	-	33,505	100.00%	Democratic hold
District 16	24,969	46.11%	29,182	53.89%	-	-	54,151	100.00%	Republican hold
District 17	15,931	60.18%	10,542	39.82%	-	-	26,473	100.00%	Democratic hold
District 18	37,254	79.84%	9,409	20.16%	-	-	46,663	100.00%	Democratic hold
District 19	32,147	55.44%	25,841	44.56%	-	-	57,988	100.00%	Democratic gain
District 20	25,777	58.06%	18,622	41.94%	-	-	44,399	100.00%	Democratic hold
District 21	34,116	56.62%	26,143	43.38%	-	-	60,259	100.00%	Democratic gain
District 22	32,277	73.01%	11,932	26.99%	-	-	44,209	100.00%	Democratic hold
District 23	19,666	44.39%	24,641	55.61%	-	-	44,307	100.00%	Republican hold
District 24	33,869	56.91%	25,648	43.09%	-	-	59,517	100.00%	Democratic gain
District 25	32,330	84.29%	6,025	15.71%	-	-	38,355	100.00%	Democratic hold
District 26	32,527	82.13%	5,837	14.74%	1,241	3.13%	39,605	100.00%	Democratic hold
District 27	25,817	46.42%	29,801	53.58%	-	-	55,618	100.00%	Republican hold
District 28	27,611	49.89%	27,555	49.79%	175	0.32%	55,341	100.00%	Democratic gain
District 29	14,999	35.01%	27,846	64.99%	-	-	42,845	100.00%	Republican hold
District 30	14,356	30.27%	33,068	69.73%	-	-	47,424	100.00%	Republican hold
District 31	33,528	100.00%	-	-	-	-	33,528	100.00%	Democratic hold
District 32	30,311	78.61%	8,247	21.39%	-	-	38,558	100.00%	Democratic hold
District 33	32,570	75.31%	10,679	24.69%	-	-	43,249	100.00%	Democratic hold
District 34	28,894	78.06%	8,120	21.94%	-	-	37,014	100.00%	Democratic hold
District 35	17,162	60.57%	9,602	33.89%	1,568	5.53%	28,332	100.00%	Democratic hold
District 36	20,633	44.61%	25,622	55.39%	-	-	46,255	100.00%	Republican hold
District 37	27,930	50.49%	27,391	49.51%	-	-	55,321	100.00%	Democratic gain
District 38	20,604	42.56%	27,807	57.44%	-	-	48,411	100.00%	Republican hold
District 39	25,871	100.00%	-	-	-	-	25,871	100.00%	Democratic hold
District 40	16,372	37.98%	26,734	62.02%	-	-	43,106	100.00%	Republican hold
District 41	22,742	45.04%	27,755	54.96%	-	-	50,497	100.00%	Republican hold
District 42	18,631	40.50%	27,377	59.50%	-	-	46,008	100.00%	Republican hold
District 43	21,544	49.47%	22,006	50.53%	-	-	43,550	100.00%	Republican hold
District 44	26,267	100.00%	-	-	-	-	26,267	100.00%	Democratic hold
District 45	20,780	63.71%	11,838	36.29%	-	-	32,618	100.00%	Democratic hold
District 46	28,372	100.00%	-	-	-	-	28,372	100.00%	Democratic hold
District 47	20,919	41.90%	29,009	58.10%	-	-	49,928	100.00%	Republican hold
District 48	17,259	35.87%	30,855	64.13%	-	-	48,114	100.00%	Republican hold
District 49	18,834	57.61%	13,859	42.39%	-	-	32,693	100.00%	Democratic hold
District 50	15,225	36.01%	27,051	63.99%	-	-	42,276	100.00%	Republican hold
District 51	14,305	39.91%	21,542	60.09%	-	-	35,847	100.00%	Republican hold
District 52	22,128	41.39%	31,329	58.61%	-	-	53,457	100.00%	Republican hold
District 53	13,945	35.87%	24,928	64.13%	-	-	38,873	100.00%	Republican hold
District 54	18,438	39.16%	28,641	60.84%	-	-	47,079	100.00%	Republican hold
District 55	18,174	42.35%	23,687	55.20%	1,051	2.45%	42,912	100.00%	Republican hold
District 56	24,780	62.64%	14,781	37.36%	-	-	39,561	100.00%	Democratic hold
District 57	16,420	36.89%	28,085	63.11%	-	-	44,505	100.00%	Republican hold
District 58	25,319	70.13%	10,784	29.87%	-	-	36,103	100.00%	Democratic hold
District 59	25,704	49.61%	26,113	50.39%	-	-	51,817	100.00%	Republican gain
District 60	21,465	53.57%	18,602	46.43%	-	-	40,067	100.00%	Democratic hold
District 61	20,243	40.37%	29,904	59.63%	-	-	50,147	100.00%	Republican hold
District 62	13,941	26.34%	38,993	73.66%	-	-	52,934	100.00%	Republican hold
District 63	23,136	56.06%	18,131	43.94%	-	-	41,267	100.00%	Democratic hold
District 64	18,828	54.76%	15,554	45.24%	-	-	34,382	100.00%	Democratic hold
District 65	16,719	33.33%	33,442	66.67%	-	-	50,161	100.00%	Republican hold
District 66	10,331	24.51%	31,812	75.49%	-	-	42,143	100.00%	Republican hold
District 67	25,713	43.73%	33,092	56.27%	-	-	58,805	100.00%	Republican hold
District 68	17,921	33.64%	34,160	64.12%	1,193	2.24%	53,274	100.00%	Republican hold
District 69	18,561	36.24%	32,653	63.76%	-	-	51,214	100.00%	Republican hold
District 70	14,780	34.97%	27,484	65.03%	-	-	42,264	100.00%	Republican hold
District 71	17,466	38.19%	28,268	61.81%	-	-	45,734	100.00%	Republican hold
District 72	13,393	30.96%	29,861	69.04%	-	-	43,254	100.00%	Republican hold
District 73	19,346	40.23%	28,742	59.77%	-	-	48,088	100.00%	Republican hold
District 74	12,768	32.51%	26,504	67.49%	-	-	39,272	100.00%	Republican hold
District 75	21,027	51.50%	19,377	47.32%	423	1.0%	40,439	100.00%	Democratic hold
District 76	18,897	37.63%	31,326	62.37%	-	-	50,223	100.00%	Republican hold
District 77	16,044	35.70%	27,739	61.72%	1,159	2.58%	44,942	100.00%	Republican hold
District 78	13,549	32.13%	28,619	67.87%	-	-	42,168	100.00%	Republican hold
District 79	15,570	40.50%	22,879	59.50%	-	-	38,449	100.00%	Republican hold
District 80	10,183	24.48%	31,411	75.52%	-	-	41,594	100.00%	Republican hold
District 81	10,992	25.32%	32,419	74.68%	-	-	43,411	100.00%	Republican hold
District 82	10,435	26.40%	29,085	73.60%	-	-	39,520	100.00%	Republican hold
District 83	11,991	30.87%	26,847	69.13%	-	-	38,838	100.00%	Republican hold
District 84	8,149	17.51%	38,401	82.49%	-	-	46,550	100.00%	Republican hold
District 85	10,452	27.13%	28,077	72.87%	-	-	38,529	100.00%	Republican hold
District 86	11,153	27.84%	27,443	68.51%	1,460	3.64%	40,056	100.00%	Republican hold
District 87	10,540	27.32%	28,042	72.68%	-	-	38,582	100.00%	Republican hold
District 88	13,232	34.00%	25,680	66.00%	-	-	38,912	100.00%	Republican hold
District 89	16,402	34.86%	30,648	65.14%	-	-	47,050	100.00%	Republican hold
District 90	14,006	38.80%	22,089	61.20%	-	-	36,095	100.00%	Republican hold
District 91	10,084	26.47%	28,010	73.53%	-	-	38,094	100.00%	Republican hold
District 92	12,895	35.66%	23,265	64.34%	-	-	36,160	100.00%	Republican hold
District 93	9,586	25.57%	27,910	74.43%	-	-	37,496	100.00%	Republican hold
District 94	16,855	41.71%	23,556	58.29%	-	-	40,411	100.00%	Republican hold
District 95	15,027	34.26%	28,841	65.74%	-	-	43,868	100.00%	Republican hold
District 96	22,229	100.00%	-	-	-	-	22,229	100.00%	Democratic hold
District 97	12,164	31.65%	26,267	68.35%	-	-	38,431	100.00%	Republican hold
District 98	11,763	32.00%	24,993	68.00%	-	-	36,756	100.00%	Republican hold
District 99	19,346	53.04%	17,131	46.96%	-	-	36,477	100.00%	Democratic hold
Total	1,992,886	47.79%	2,166,790	51.96%	10,612	0.25%	4,170,288	100.00%	
