= Ohio's 17th House of Representatives district =

American legislative district

Ohio's 17th State House of Representatives district
Representative
Mike Dovilla; R–Berea
- Population (2020): 124,902

Ohio's 17th House of Representatives district is currently represented by Republican Mike Dovilla. It is located entirely within Cuyahoga County and includes the cities of Brook Park, Fairview Park, Middleburg Heights, Rocky River, Strongsville, and part of Cleveland.

== List of members representing the district ==
Member	Party	Years	General Assembly	Electoral history
District established January 2, 1967.
Richard Christiansen (Mansfield)	Democratic	January 2, 1967 – December 31, 1972	107th 108th 109th	Elected in 1966. Re-elected in 1968. Re-elected in 1970. Retired.
Virginia Aveni (Lyndhurst)	Democratic	January 1, 1973 – December 31, 1978	110th 111th 112th	Elected in 1972. Re-elected in 1974. Re-elected in 1976. Lost re-election.
Matt Hatchadorian (Mayfield)	Republican	January 1, 1979 – February 3, 1981	113th 114th	Elected in 1978. Re-elected in 1980. Resigned to become Cuyahoga County Auditor.
Vacant		February 3, 1981 – February 10, 1981	114th	
Jeffrey L. Dean (Solon)	Republican	February 10, 1981 – December 31, 1982	114th	Appointed to finish Hatchadorian's term. Lost re-election.
Leroy Peterson (Maple Heights)	Democratic	January 3, 1983 – December 31, 1988	115th 116th 117th	Elected in 1982. Re-elected in 1984. Re-elected in 1986. Retired to run for state senator.
Suzanne Bergansky (Solon)	Democratic	January 2, 1989 – December 31, 1992	118th 119th	Elected in 1988. Re-elected in 1990. Redistricted to the 15th district and lost re-nomination.
Madeline Cain (Lakewood)	Democratic	January 4, 1993 – December 31, 1995	120th 121st	Redistricted from the 8th district and re-elected in 1992. Re-elected in 1994. Resigned to become mayor of Lakewood.
Dan Brady (Cleveland)	Democratic	January 3, 1996 – December 31, 1998	121st 122nd	Appointed to finish Cain's term. Re-elected in 1996. Retired to run for state senator.
Bryan Flannery (Lakewood)	Democratic	January 4, 1999 – December 31, 2002	123rd 124th	Elected in 1998. Re-elected in 2000. Retired to run for Ohio Secretary of State.
Jim Trakas (Independence)	Republican	January 6, 2003 – December 31, 2006	125th 126th	Redistricted from the 15th district and re-elected in 2002. Re-elected in 2004. Term-limited.
Josh Mandel (Lyndhurst)	Republican	January 1, 2007 – December 31, 2010	127th 128th	Elected in 2006. Re-elected in 2008. Retired to run for Ohio State Treasurer.
Marlene Anielski (Walton Hills)	Republican	January 3, 2011 – December 31, 2012	129th	Elected in 2010. Redistricted to the 6th district.
Michael Curtin (Marble Cliff)	Democratic	January 7, 2013 – December 31, 2016	130th 131st	Elected in 2012. Re-elected in 2014. Retired.
Adam Miller (Columbus)	Democratic	January 2, 2017 – December 31, 2022	132nd 133rd 134th	Elected in 2016. Re-elected in 2018. Re-elected in 2020. Redistricted to the 6th district.
Tom Patton (Strongsville)	Republican	January 2, 2023 – present	135th	Redistricted from the 7th district and re-elected in 2022.
