= Christine Cockley =

American politician

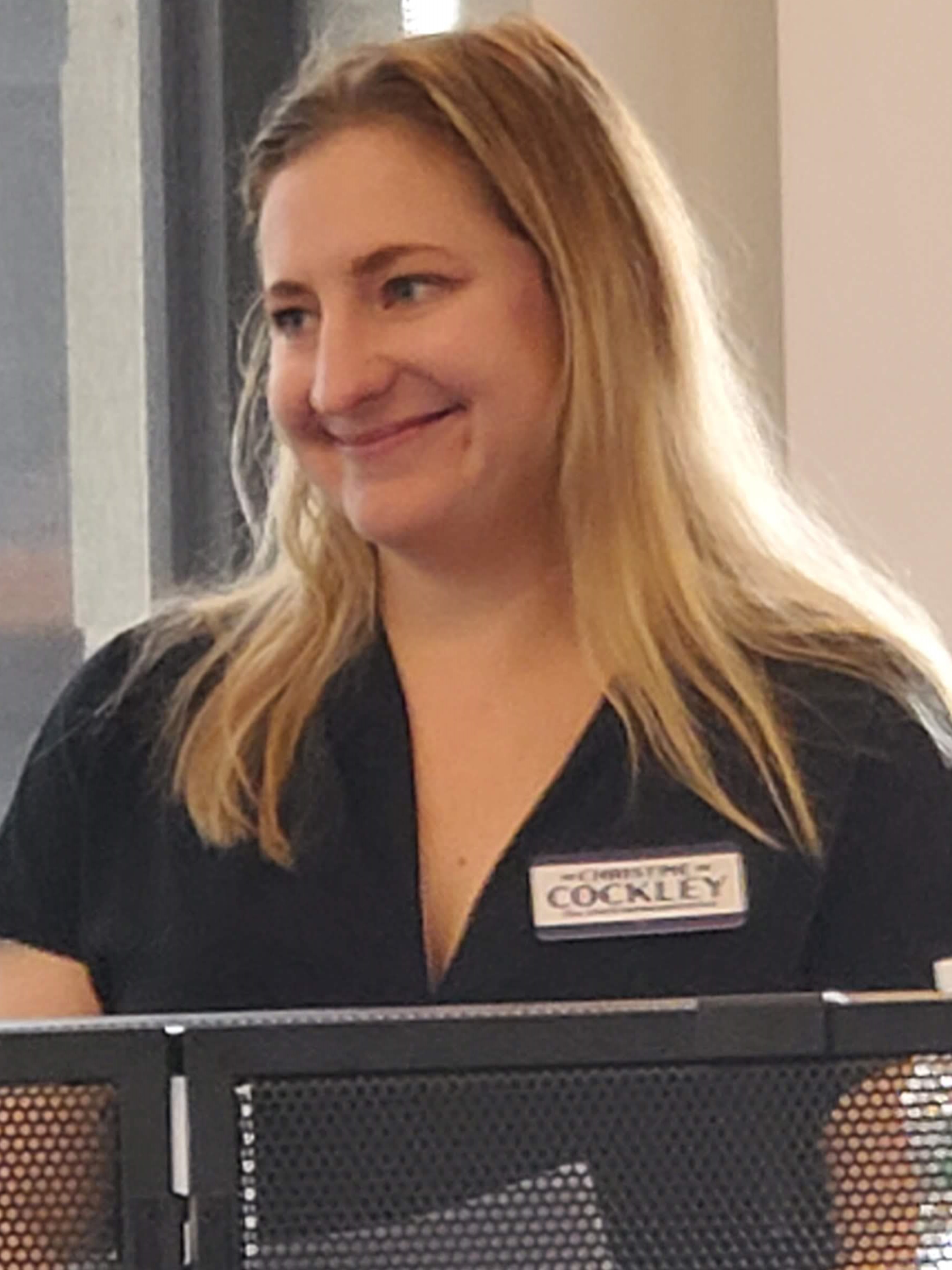
- Cockley in 2024

Member of the Ohio House of Representatives from the 6th district
- Incumbent
- Assumed office January 1, 2025
- Preceded by: Adam Miller

Personal details
- Born: Mansfield, Ohio; 1995 or 1996 (age 29–30)
- Party: Democratic
- Spouse: Simon Dallas
- Parent(s): Mark Cockley and Heather Cockley
- Education: John Glenn College of Public Affairs

Christine Cockley (born 1995/1996) is an American politician who is a Democratic member of the Ohio House of Representatives, representing the 6th district. She was first elected in the 2024 Ohio House of Representatives election, defeating Republican nominee Hussein Jabiri with 60.4% of the vote. The district includes portions of western Columbus, Valleyview, Franklin Township, and Prairie Township.

Cockley is a member of the Ohio Jewish Caucus.

== Early life and education ==
Cockley was born in Mansfield, Ohio, and moved to Columbus to attend the John Glenn College of Public Affairs, which is a part of the Ohio State University. She earned a Bachelor of Arts and Master of Public Administration degree.

== Personal life ==
Cockley is queer.
