= Jessica Miranda =

American politician from Ohio

Jessica E. Miranda
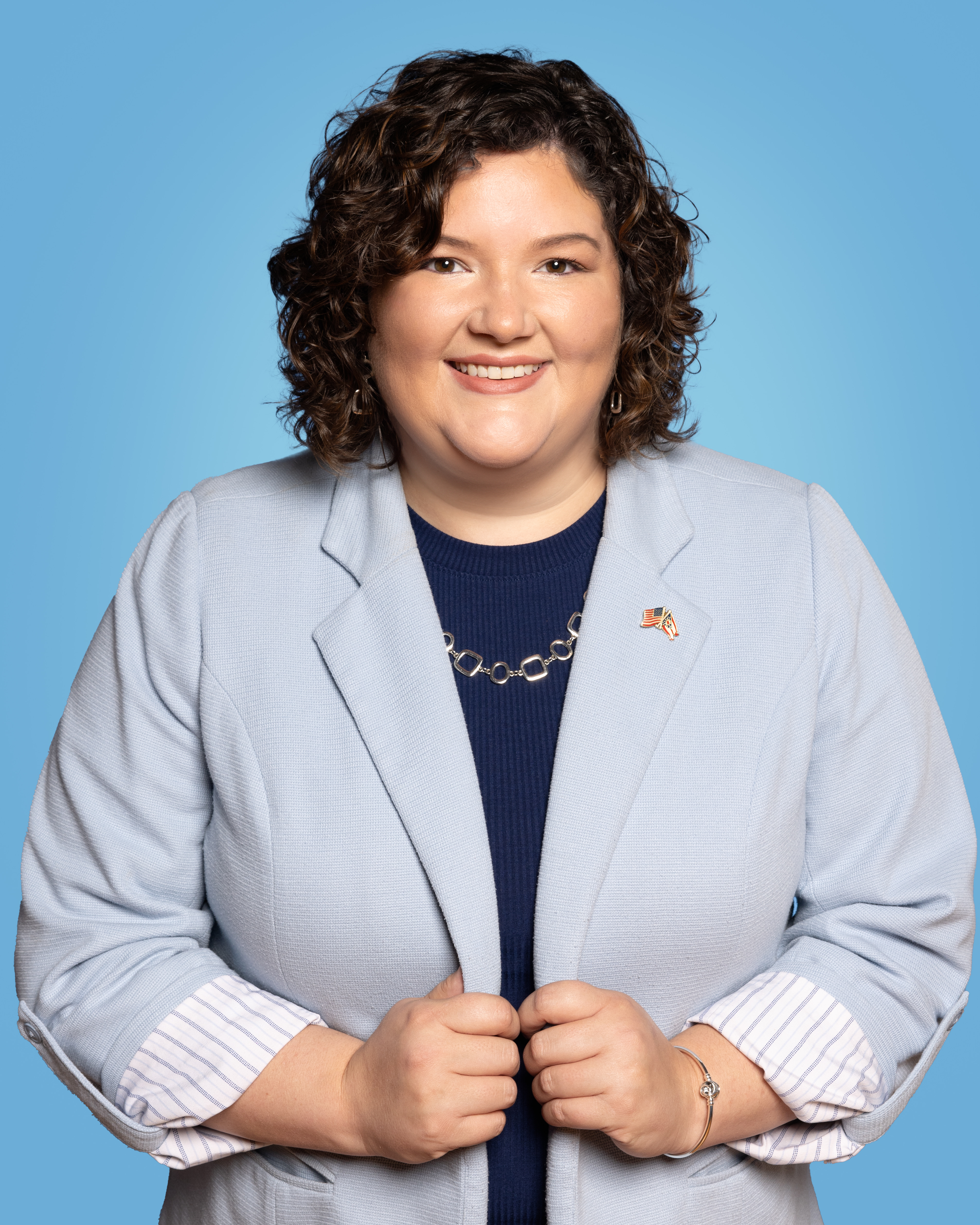

Hamilton County Auditor
- Incumbent
- Assumed office April 13, 2024
- Appointed by: Hamilton County Democratic Central Committee
- Preceded by: Brigid Kelly

Member of the Ohio House of Representatives from the 28th district
- In office January 1, 2019 – April 13, 2024
- Preceded by: Jonathan Dever
- Succeeded by: Jodi Whitted

Personal details
- Party: Democratic
- Spouse: Jose Miranda
- Children: 3
- Occupation: Small Business Owner
- Website: jessicaforohio.com

Jessica E. Miranda is a businesswoman and American Democratic politician currently serving as the auditor of Hamilton County, Ohio. She formerly served as a member of the Ohio House of Representatives, representing the 28th district from 2019 until her resignation in 2024.

== Early life and career ==
Miranda attended Talawanda High School near Oxford, Ohio. Miranda and her husband, Jose, are parents of three daughters. Miranda was selected as one of the Cincinnati Business Courier's 40 Under 40 for 2022.

== Ohio House of Representatives ==
In the 2018 election, Miranda defeated incumbent Representative Jonathan Dever to win her seat in the Ohio House of Representatives, a rematch of her unsuccessful 2016 bid in the same district. Despite Dever initially leading on election night, Miranda was declared the victor by a 56-vote margin after the bipartisan Hamilton County Board of Elections counted provisional ballots as part of a closely watched recount. This was the closest margin of victory of any state legislative campaign in Ohio. She would be re-elected with 51.7% of the vote in 2020, and 52.4% of the vote in 2022.

In her second term, Miranda was elected Minority Whip for the Ohio House Democratic Caucus, a position she served in until early April 2024. Miranda was a member of the Ohio Business First Caucus and the Ohio Gun Violence Prevention Caucus, which she co-founded with Ohio Senator Cecil Thomas. Miranda resigned from her seat on April 13, 2024. Shortly after her resignation, HB 161, which she co-sponsored, was signed into law by Governor Mike DeWine, officially banning all forms of spousal rape in Ohio.

=== Committee assignments ===
- Committee on Insurance (Ranking Member)
- Committee on Rules & Reference
- Committee on Transportation & Public Safety
- Committee on Aviation & Aerospace

== Hamilton County Auditor ==
On March 21, 2024, County Auditor Brigid Kelly announced her resignation due to health complications associated with esophageal cancer. In her resignation, which took place less than a week before her death, Kelly recommended Miranda for the then-vacant position. Miranda was officially appointed on April 13, 2024, and was required to run in a special election on the November ballot. Running against Republican Tom Brinkman, Miranda won the election with approximately 55% of the vote.

In 2025, Miranda joined other County Auditors from Southwest Ohio in calling on the State Legislature to pass property tax reforms, proposing four initiatives created by the County Auditors Association of Ohio (CAAO).

== Winton Woods Board of Education ==
Miranda was elected to the Winton Woods Board of Education in 2013 and served until 2018, during which time she was President, Vice-President, legislative liaison, and bond levy chairperson. She received a Community Spirit Award for her "years of service" and "significant contributions" to the Winton Woods City School District.

== Election history ==
Ohio House 28th District
Year	Democrat	Votes	Pct	Republican	Votes	Pct
2022	Jessica Miranda	25,891	52.42%	Chris Monzel	23,501	47.58%
2020	Jessica Miranda	35,353	51.7%	Chris Monzel	33,039	48.3%
2018	Jessica Miranda	27,611	49.9%	Jonathan Dever	27,555	49.8%
2016	Jessica Miranda	26,808	42.6%	Jonathan Dever	36,098	57.38%
