= Ohio's 20th House of Representatives district =

American legislative district

Ohio's 20th State House of Representatives district
Representative
Terrence Upchurch; D–Cleveland
- Population (2020): 125,116

Ohio's 20th House of Representatives district is currently represented by Democrat Terrence Upchurch. It is located entirely within Cuyahoga County and includes part of Cleveland.

== List of members representing the district ==
Member	Party	Years	General Assembly	Electoral history
District established January 2, 1967.
Joseph Hiestand (Hillsboro)	Republican	January 2, 1967 – December 31, 1972	107th 108th 109th	Elected in 1966. Re-elected in 1968. Re-elected in 1970. Redistricted to the 77th district.
John Brandenberg (Cincinnati)	Republican	January 1, 1973 – December 31, 1976	110th 111th	Elected in 1972. Re-elected in 1974. Lost re-nomination.
Thomas Pottenger (Cincinnati)	Republican	January 3, 1977 – July 20, 1990	112th 113th 114th 115th 116th 117th 118th	Elected in 1976. Re-elected in 1978. Re-elected in 1980. Re-elected in 1982. Re-elected in 1984. Re-elected in 1986. Re-elected in 1988. Resigned.
Cheryl Winkler (Green Township)	Republican	July 20, 1990 – December 31, 1992	118th 119th	Appointed to finish Pottenger's term. Re-elected in 1990. Redistricted to the 34th district.
Ronald M. Mottl (North Royalton)	Democratic	January 4, 1993 – February 5, 1997	120th 121st 122nd	Redistricted from the 10th district and re-elected in 1992. Re-elected in 1994. Re-elected in 1996. Resigned.
Ron Mottl Jr. (North Royalton)	Democratic	February 5, 1997 – December 31, 1998	122nd	Appointed to finish Mottl's term. Lost re-nomination.
Dean DePiero (Parma)	Democratic	January 4, 1999 – December 31, 2002	123rd 124th	Elected in 1998. Re-elected in 2000. Redistricted to the 15th district.
Jim McGregor (Gahanna)	Republican	January 6, 2003 – December 31, 2008	125th 126th 127th	Redistricted from the 25th district and re-elected in 2002. Re-elected in 2004. Re-elected in 2006. Lost re-election.
Nancy Garland (New Albany)	Democratic	January 5, 2009 – December 31, 2012	128th 129th	Elected in 2008. Re-elected in 2010. Retired.
Heather Bishoff (Blacklick)	Democratic	January 7, 2013 – April 25, 2017	130th 131st 132nd	Elected in 2012. Re-elected in 2014. Re-elected in 2016. Resigned.
Vacant		April 25, 2017 – June 28, 2017	132nd	
Richard Brown (Canal Winchester)	Democratic	June 28, 2017 – December 31, 2022	132nd 133rd 134th	Appointed to finish Bishoff's term. Re-elected in 2018. Re-elected in 2020. Redistricted to the 5th district.
Terrence Upchurch (Cleveland)	Democratic	January 2, 2023 – present	135th	Redistricted from the 10th district and re-elected in 2022.

== Election results ==
=== 2020 ===
2020 Democratic primary
Party	Candidate	Votes	%
Democratic	Richard Brown (incumbent)	7,527	100.0
Total votes		7,527	100.0

2020 Republican primary
Party	Candidate	Votes	%
Republican	Chris Baer	3,348	100.0
Total votes		3,348	100.0

General Election
Party	Candidate	Votes	%
Democratic	Richard Brown (incumbent)	36,330	59.3
Republican	Chris Baer	24,928	40.7
Total votes		61,258	100.0
Democratic hold		Swing	▲1.3

== Historical district boundaries ==
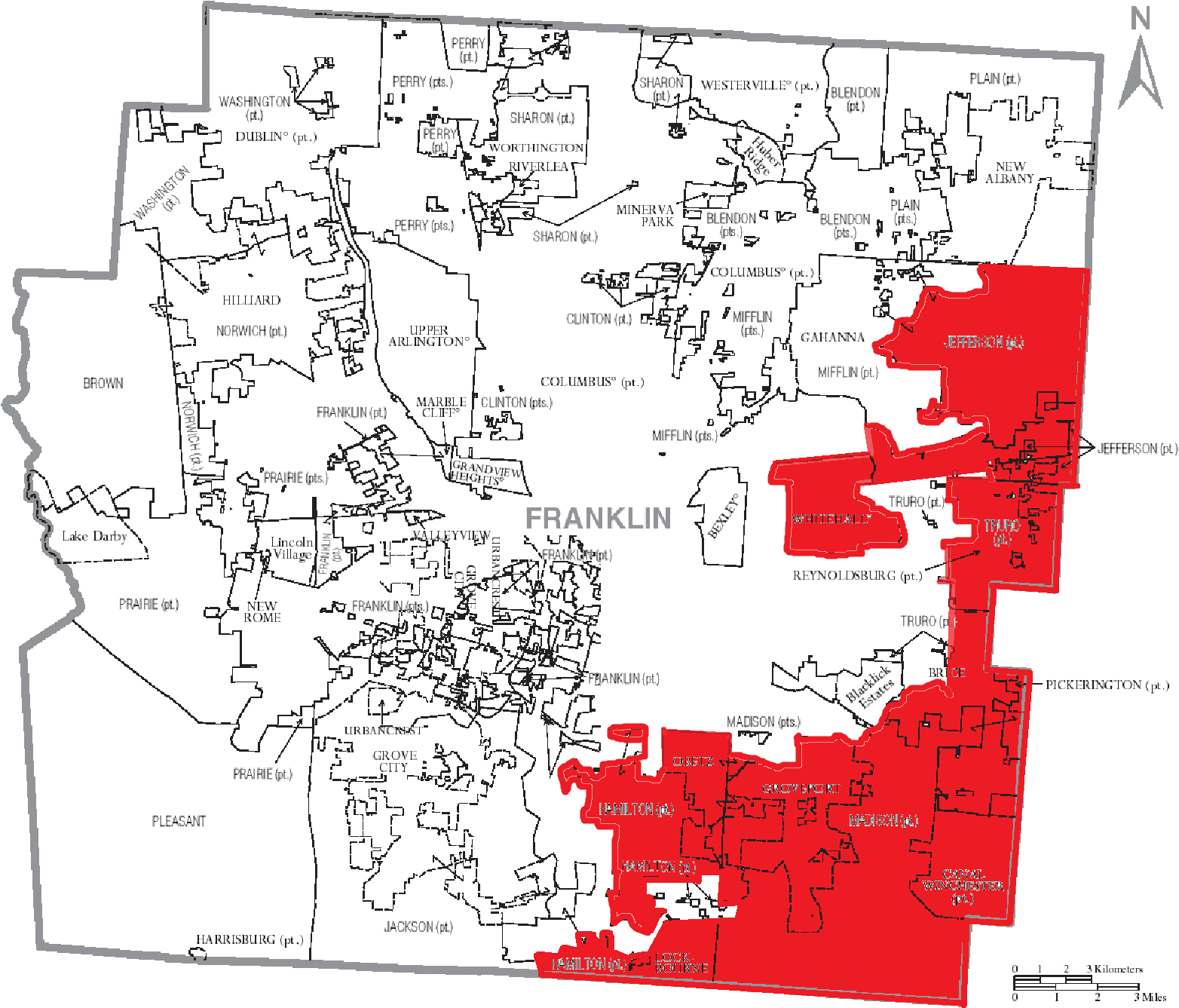
2013–2022
