= Robert D. Schuck =

American politician

Robert Schuck
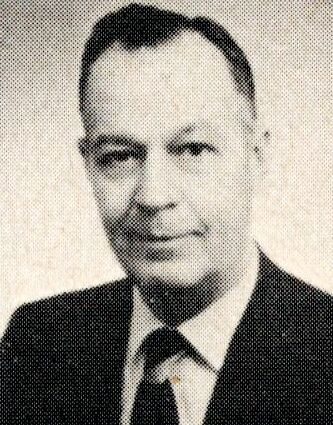

Member of the Ohio House of Representatives from the 5th district
- In office March 1, 1969 – December 31, 1972
- Preceded by: Ralph Cole
- Succeeded by: Michael Oxley

Personal details
- Born: September 1, 1917
- Died: February 5, 2003 (aged 85)
- Party: Republican

Robert D. Schuck (September 1, 1917 – February 5, 2003) was a Republican politician who served in the Ohio House of Representatives. Serving in the U.S. Army Counter-Intelligence Corps during World War II, he later became an attorney, opening a general practice in Findlay.

When incumbent Representative Ralph Cole was appointed to a judicial seat for the state Court of Appeals, Schuck was appointed to replace him. He subsequently won election to a full term in 1968. He won reelection in 1970. When redistricting occurred in 1973, Schuck's district was eliminated, and after two terms, he left office.

After leaving the legislature, Schuck went on to serve as city prosecutor along with returning to private practice. He retired in 1994, after over forty years of practice. He died in 2003.
