= 2009 Cleveland mayoral election =

- November 3, 2009
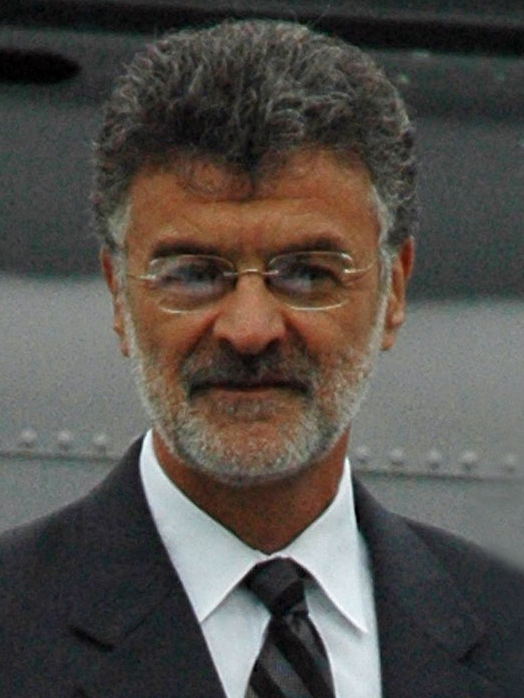

Candidate	Frank G. Jackson	Bill Patmon
Party	Nonpartisan	Nonpartisan
Popular vote	60,510	17,278
Percentage	77.27%	22.06%
Mayor before election
Frank G. Jackson
Democratic
Elected mayor
Frank G. Jackson
Democratic

The 2009 Cleveland mayoral election took place on November 3, 2009, to elect the Mayor of Cleveland, Ohio. The election was officially nonpartisan, with the top two candidates from the September 8 primary advancing to the general election, regardless of party.

== Candidates ==
- Kimberly F. Brown, former radio broadcaster
- Laverne Jones Gore, marketing consultant (Democrat)
- Frank G. Jackson, incumbent Mayor of Cleveland (Democrat)
- Robert M. Kilo, businessman
- Bill Patmon, former Cleveland City Councilman (Democrat)

== Primary election ==
Primary election results
Candidate	Votes	%
Frank G. Jackson (incumbent)	26,107	71.64
Bill Patmon	4,036	11.08
Robert M. Kilo	3,624	9.94
Kimberly F. Brown	1,582	4.34
Laverne Jones Gore	1,093	3.00
Total votes	36,442	100.00

== General election ==
Cleveland mayoral election, 2009
Candidate	Votes	%
Frank G. Jackson (incumbent)	60,510	77.27
Bill Patmon	17,278	22.06
Write-ins	525	0.67
Total votes	78,313	100.00
