= Heather Bishoff =

American politician

Representative Heather Bishoff

Member of the Ohio House of Representatives from the 20th district
- In office January 5, 2013 – May 21, 2017
- Preceded by: Nancy Garland
- Succeeded by: Richard Brown

Personal details
- Born: Ohio, U.S.
- Party: Democratic
- Spouse: Eric Bishoff
- Children: 4
- Education: Franklin University
- Occupation: Finance/U.S. Army (retired)
- Website: http://www.heatherbishoff.com/

Heather Bishoff is a former Democratic member of the Ohio House of Representatives for the 20th district. She was elected in 2012, defeating Republican Nathan Burd with 59.28% of the vote. Previously she defeated Marco Miller to win the Democratic primary. Bishoff has served on the Gahanna-Jefferson Board of Education, has founded a financial company with her husband and is a veteran of the US Army.

== Ohio House of Representatives ==
Heather Bishoff was a part of the 130th and 131st Ohio General Assembly and was elected to the 132nd on November 8, 2016. During her tenure, she served on the Armed Services, Veterans Affairs, and Public Safety Committee as well as the Health and Aging Committee. During the 131st General Assembly, she was named as a Ranking Member on the House Insurance Committee because of her experience in the financial industry.

Bishoff was the sponsor of several bills throughout her terms. Most notably, House Bill 229, which was passed by both the House and Senate and signed off by the governor in June 2016, allows Ohio families to create their own private trust companies so they can manage their own trust's investments.

Bishoff resigned from the House on April 23, 2017, to move to San Diego to be closer to family.

== Electoral history ==
Ohio House of Representatives, 2016
Party	Candidate	Votes	%
Democratic	Heather Bishoff (inc.)	27,626	53.4
Republican	Lisa Schacht	24,144	46.6

Ohio House of Representatives, 2014
Party	Candidate	Votes	%
Democratic	Heather Bishoff (inc.)	16,436	57.2
Republican	Dan Mefford	12,319	42.8

Ohio House of Representatives, 2012
Party	Candidate	Votes	%
Democratic	Heather Bishoff	31,284	59.3
Republican	Nathan Burd	21,492	40.7

Ohio House of Representatives Democratic Primary, 2012
Party	Candidate	Votes	%
Democratic	Heather Bishoff	2,549	56.4
Democratic	Marco Miller	1,971	43.6

Gahanna-Jefferson City School Board, 2011
Party	Candidate	Votes	%
Independent	Heather Bishoff	7,728	32.9
Independent	Carol J. McKenna	6,413	27.3
Independent	Jason Phillips	3,705	15.8
Independent	Mark V. Shaffer	3,120	13.3
Independent	Ken Granville	2,513	10.7
