= James Zehner =

American politician

Member of the Ohio House of Representatives from the 63rd district
- In office January 3, 1977-December 31, 1982
- Preceded by: John Scott
- Succeeded by: Bob Doyle

Personal details
- Party: Democratic

James S. Zehner is a Democratic politician who formerly served in the Ohio House of Representatives. An educator from Yellow Springs, Ohio, Zehner won election to a Republican open seat in 1976, much due to a wealth of resources provided to him by Speaker of the House Vern Riffe. He was sworn into office on January 3, 1977. A top target for Republicans in 1978, Zehner went on to win a second term. Zehner again won reelection in 1980. in 1982 he did not run for run again. the democratic candidate, Carl Adkins, won the Democratic nomination. Adkins was the former superintendent for the Xenia school system. He lost to Robert Doyle in the general election

Following his time in elected office, Zehner served in the local BMV in Greene County, until retiring in 2010. He currently owns and operates a local restaurant in Yellow Springs.
