= Jodi Whitted =

American politician

Member of the Ohio House of Representatives from the 28th district
- In office May 8, 2024 – December 31, 2024
- Preceded by: Jessica Miranda
- Succeeded by: Karen Brownlee

Personal details
- Party: Democratic
- Occupation: Educator and social worker
- Profession: Politician

Jodi Whitted is an American social worker and politician. She was a member of the Ohio House of Representatives for the 28th District, affiliating with the Democratic Party, a position she held for most of 2024 after being appointed to replace Jessica Miranda.

She is a social worker and professor from Madeira, Ohio.

Whitted introduced two pieces of legislation in the 135th Ohio General Assembly.

1. Marriage Equality Act (H.B. 636), which reconciles Ohio Revised Code with federal law regarding same-sex marriage and to provide for the right to interracial marriage.
2. Ohio Social Work Internship Grant Program (H.B. 675), which establishes a grant for social work students who are completing their mandatory internships. It is meant to pay students for the work they are doing and to help expand the reach of social workers in Ohio.
