= Nancy Garland =

American politician

Member of the Ohio House of Representatives from the 20th district
- In office January 5, 2009 – December 31, 2012
- Preceded by: Jim McGregor
- Succeeded by: Heather Bishoff

Personal details
- Born: January 25, 1954 (age 72) Washington Court House, Ohio
- Party: Democratic
- Education: Ohio University, George Mason University
- Profession: Clinical Assistant

Nancy Garland (born January 25, 1954) is an American clinical assistant, and a former Democratic member of the Ohio House of Representatives, representing the 20th District from 2009-2012.

== Career ==
After being raised in Washington Court House, Ohio, Garland attended Ohio University before attending George Mason for law. She has been an aide for Congressman Jack Hightower, and spent decades of lobbying in Columbus and Washington, D.C., where she worked for the American Optometric Association and the American Physical Therapy Association. Garland most recently served as executive director of the Ohio Physical Therapy Association.

== Ohio House of Representatives ==
Democrat Bev Campbell had been chosen to try to take the 20th District from incumbent Republican Jim McGregor in 2008, but Representative Ted Celeste encouraged Garland to enter the race. A primary race resulted between Garland and Campbell. Garland won the race by about 2,750 votes.

The general election against McGregor proved to be one of the closest watched House races of the cycle, with Republicans hitting Garland's lobbying history negatively. In the end, Garland defeated McGregor by more than 2,000 votes.

In 2010, Garland was again targeted by Republicans, and she faced attorney Matt Carle in the general election. The campaign again proved to be negative. In an overwhelmingly Republican year, Garland still beat Carle by 2,000 votes. In her second term, Garland served as a member of the Criminal Justice Committee; the Finance and Appropriations Committee, as ranking member of the Higher Education Subcommittee; the Financial Institutions, Housing, and Urban Development Committee; the Economic and Small Business Development Committee; and on the Health and Aging Committee. She also was a member of the Correctional Institution Inspection Committee, the Hospital Measures Advisory Council, and the Joint Legislative Committee on Medicaid Technology and Reform, and was the Chairman of the Ohio Women's Democratic Caucus.

== Initiatives and positions ==
A reintroduction from the 128th Ohio General Assembly, Garland supports legislation that bans texting while driving, and voted legislation to do this out of committee. The bill passed the full Ohio House.

Garland has been a vocal advocate about finding measures to prevent prescription drug abuse. "It is imperative that we enact this law to save Ohioans from the scourge of prescription-drug abuse," she has said.
