= Adam Miller (politician) =

American politician (born 1965)

Member of the Ohio House of Representatives
- In office January 2, 2023 – January 5, 2025
- Preceded by: Phil Robinson
- Succeeded by: Christine Cockley
- Constituency: 6th district
- In office January 2, 2017 – December 31, 2022
- Preceded by: Michael Curtin
- Succeeded by: Tom Patton
- Constituency: 17th district

Personal details
- Born: Adam Clay Miller; January 27, 1965 (age 61) Columbus, Ohio, U.S.
- Party: Democratic
- Education: Ohio State University (BA); Capital University (JD); Army War College (MS)

Military service
- Branch/service: United States Army; Army Reserve
- Rank: Colonel
- Unit: Army Judge Advocate General's Corps
- Battles/wars: War in Afghanistan

Adam Clay Miller (born January 27, 1965) is an American attorney and politician who served as a member of the Ohio House of Representatives from the 6th district from 2023 to 2025, previously representing the 17th district from 2017 to 2022. He is a Democrat. The district consists of portions of Columbus including Hilltop, and the Southside as well as Valleyview in Franklin County.

== Early life and education ==
Miller was born in Columbus, Ohio and is a fourth-generation resident of the Hilltop neighborhood. He earned a Bachelor of Arts degree in English literature from Ohio State University, a Juris Doctor from the Capital University Law School, and a Master of Science in strategic studies from the United States Army War College.

== Career ==
Outside of politics, Miller works as a director with Kegler, Brown, Hill + Ritter. In 1998, Miller ran unsuccessfully for the United States House of Representatives against Deborah Pryce. He lost again in 2004, this time for a seat on the Ohio State Board of Education.

A colonel in the United States Army Reserve, Miller is a Judge Advocate General's Corps officer. He did a tour of Afghanistan in 2004 and another in 2020. Formerly, Miller served on the Grandview Heights City School Board.

=== Ohio House of Representatives ===
In 2016, Representative Michael Curtin decided not to seek a third term. Opting to seek the Democratic nomination, Miller defeated Matt Jolson 58% to 42%. This was despite Miller not being endorsed by the Franklin County Democratic Party.

In a safely Democratic seat, Miller won the general election against Republican John Rush by only a 54% to 46% margin, much closer than anticipated. Miller is only the second person to hold this seat, after Curtin, since it was established in 2013.

== Personal life ==
He is married with two children and resides in Marble Cliff.
