= Eugene Miller (Ohio politician) =

American politician

Member-elect of the Ohio House of Representatives from the 20th district
- Assuming office January 1, 2027
- Succeeding: Terrence Upchurch

Cleveland City Councilman
- In office 2009–2013
- Preceded by: Roosevelt Coats
- Succeeded by: Jeff Johnson
- Constituency: 10th ward

State Representative

Member of the Ohio House of Representatives from the 10th district
- In office January 2, 2007-March 5, 2009
- Preceded by: Shirley Smith
- Succeeded by: Robin Belcher

Personal details
- Party: Democratic
- Education: Baldwin Wallace College

Eugene Miller is a former member of Cleveland City Council and a former member of the Ohio House of Representatives, representing the 10th District from 2007 to 2009. He has represented Cleveland's Ward 10 since May 2009, when he was appointed to complete the unexpired term of Councilman Roosevelt Coats. He won an election for the seat in November 2009.
