= Jeff Johnson (Ohio politician) =

American politician (born 1958)

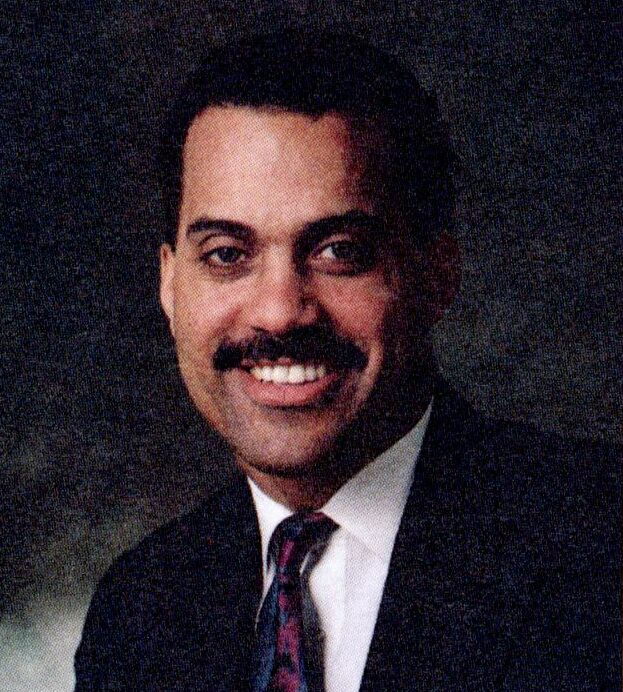

Member of Cleveland City Council from Ward 10
- In office January 1, 2014 – January 1, 2018
- Preceded by: Eugene Miller
- Succeeded by: Anthony Hairston

Member of Cleveland City Council from Ward 8
- In office January 1, 2010 – December 31, 2013
- Preceded by: Shari Cloud
- Succeeded by: Michael Polensek
- In office August 1984 – December 31, 1989
- Preceded by: Michael R. White
- Succeeded by: Bill Patmon

Member of the Ohio Senate from the 21st district
- In office January 3, 1990 – December 31, 1998
- Preceded by: Michael R. White
- Succeeded by: C. J. Prentiss

Personal details
- Born: April 10, 1958 (age 68) Cleveland, Ohio, U.S.
- Party: Democratic
- Education: Kent State University (BA); Case Western Reserve University (MA, JD)

Jeffrey D. Johnson (born April 10, 1958) is an American politician and attorney who is serving as an elected judge of the Cleveland Municipal Court. He also served as a member of Cleveland City Council for Ward 10 from 2014 to 2018. Johnson served as councilman for Ward 8 from 1984 to 1990, and as a member of the Ohio Senate from 1990 to 1998.

== Early life and education ==
Johnson was raised in the Collinwood neighborhood and graduated from Collinwood High School. He holds a bachelor's degree in communications from Kent State University, and a Juris Doctor and a master's degree in political science from Case Western Reserve University.

== Career ==
Johnson was seen as a rising star in the Democratic Party in the 1990s, and announced his candidate to replace retiring representative Louis Stokes in the U.S. House of Representatives in 1998. A few weeks after his announcement, however, he was indicted on federal charges of extortion. FBI agents said that between 1994 and 1996, Johnson accepted $17,000 in campaign contributions and personal loans in exchange for using his influence to land state licenses for grocers. He was convicted in November 1998, and began his sentence in 2000 after losing an appeal, serving 15 months in prison and a halfway house.

Johnson returned to Cleveland, and was released early from probation in December 2001. He was hired in 2002 by Cleveland Mayor Jane Campbell as a special assistant, and in 2003, was appointed as a cabinet director of the city's Department of Community Relations. In 2007, Johnson's federal conviction was expunged and his record sealed in Ohio by Nancy McDonnell, administrative judge for the Cuyahoga County Court of Common Pleas. In 2009, the Supreme Court of Ohio unanimously reinstated Johnson's law license.

=== Cleveland City Council ===
In 1984, Johnson was appointed as councilman for Ward 8, as then-councilman Michael White was appointed to the Ohio State Senate. Johnson was elected as the Ward 8 councilman 90 days later, and was re-elected in 1985 and 1989. He was co-sponsor of the city's first Fair Housing Law, and led the successful effort to establish Cleveland's Sex Crime and Child Abuse Investigative Unit in the Cleveland Police Department. During his tenure, the Ward 8 Glenville neighborhood received new economic and housing development projects, including the Glenville Plaza, Eastside Market and Abyssinia Towers, a senior citizen apartment complex. Johnson was recognized and honored for his public service by local community groups.

=== Ohio Senate ===
Johnson became an Ohio state senator in January 1990, when he was appointed to the Senate following Senator White's election win for mayor of Cleveland. During his nine years as senator, Johnson sponsored a law creating the Ohio Infant Health Commission, and co-sponsored diverse legislation covering major issues including workplace discrimination, education reform, economic development, criminal justice reform and more. He led the successful fight to keep Central State University open in 1997 while serving as president of the Ohio Legislative Black Caucus.

In 1998, Johnson was convicted of three counts of violating the Hobbs Act, the federal law prohibiting public officials from using their office to extort money. After serving nine months, he completed a four-month halfway house program in 2001.

In 2002, Johnson was hired as an assistant to then-Mayor Jane Campbell. He was promoted to the mayor's cabinet a year later as director of the Department of Community Relations. During his years as director, Johnson was responsible for overseeing the city's police and community outreach initiative, mediation of neighborhood disputes, and implementation of the city's Fair Housing program. He was recognized by community groups for his leadership.

After Campbell's election loss in 2005, Johnson started his company, Prime Strategy Group, a political consultant firm.

In 2007, after citing his successful post-conviction career, he received from the Cuyahoga County Court of Common Pleas an expungement that sealed his record. In 2009, the Ohio Supreme Court unanimously reinstated his law license.

=== Return to Cleveland City Council ===
Johnson became a candidate for the Cleveland Ward 8 City Council position in 2009, and was elected in November of that year. In 2013, he won again after being forced to seek reelection in a new redistricted Ward 10 after his previous ward was removed.

=== 2017 Cleveland mayoral campaign ===
The Plain Dealer reported on January 16, 2017, that Johnson had stated in an interview that he planned to run for mayor of Cleveland. He made a formal announcement the next day. In the nonpartisan blanket primary, Johnson placed third out of 11 candidates.

He became the chief housing specialist at the Cleveland Housing Court in February 2020. He became the Housing Court administrator in October 2020.

=== 2021 Ohio's 11th congressional district special election ===
After Marcia Fudge was selected as Biden's nomination for secretary of Housing and Urban Development, Johnson announced his candidacy for the special election to succeed her. He finished third of nine candidates in the election.

=== Cleveland Municipal Court ===
On November 7, 2023, Johnson was elected judge of the Cleveland Municipal Court, defeating two other candidates. He is one of 12 judges in the General Division. His term of six years is 2024–2030.

== Personal life ==
Johnson married his wife, Felicia, in 2015. He is a stepfather to her two daughters from a previous marriage. In 2017, Felicia and her two daughters moved to the East Side of Cleveland. On January 12, 2021, a dissolution of the marriage was granted by Judge Diane M. Palos of the Cuyahoga County Domestic Relations Court.

Civic offices
Preceded by Michael R. White	Member of the Cleveland City Council from Ward 8; 1984–1989	Succeeded by Bill Patmon
Preceded by Shari Cloud	Member of the Cleveland City Council from Ward 8; 2010–2013	Succeeded by Michael Polensek
Preceded by Eugene Miller	Member of the Cleveland City Council from Ward 10; 2014–2018	Succeeded by Anthony Hairston
Ohio Senate
Preceded by Michael R. White	Member of the Ohio Senate from the 21st district 1990–1998	Succeeded by C. J. Prentiss
