= Jim McGregor =

American politician

Member of the Ohio House of Representatives from the 20th district
- In office October 10, 2001 – December 31, 2008
- Preceded by: David Goodman
- Succeeded by: Nancy Garland

Personal details
- Born: December 6, 1948 (age 77) Cincinnati, Ohio
- Party: Republican
- Education: University of Cincinnati
- Profession: Anthropologist

Jim McGregor (born December 6, 1948) is a Republican politician who was a member of the Ohio House of Representatives, representing the 20th District from 2001 to 2008.

== Life and career ==
Raised in Cincinnati, Ohio, McGregor graduated from the University of Cincinnati and served in the Army National Guard from 1970 to 1975. He worked for the Ohio Department of Natural Resources from 1972 to 1983, after a short tenure with the Parks and Recreation Department of Lebanon, Ohio.

McGregor went on to become mayor of Gahanna, Ohio in 1983, and served for 18 years, being elected five times. He is married to Nancy McGregor, and they have three children.

== Ohio House of Representatives ==
When Representative David Goodman was appointed to the Ohio Senate in 2001, McGregor was appointed as his replacement in the Ohio House of Representatives. He won a full term in 2002, and easily won a second term in 2004.

In 2006, Democrats saw McGregor as a top target, and ran Beverly Campbell against him. McGregor won by 933 votes. However, in 2008, he faced yet another difficult challenge in Nancy Garland. This time, McGregor was defeated, leaving office after three and one half terms.

Following defeat, he returned to the private industry. In 2011, McGregor unsuccessfully sought a position within the Ohio Division of Wildlife.
