= Karen Brownlee =

Ohio State Representative

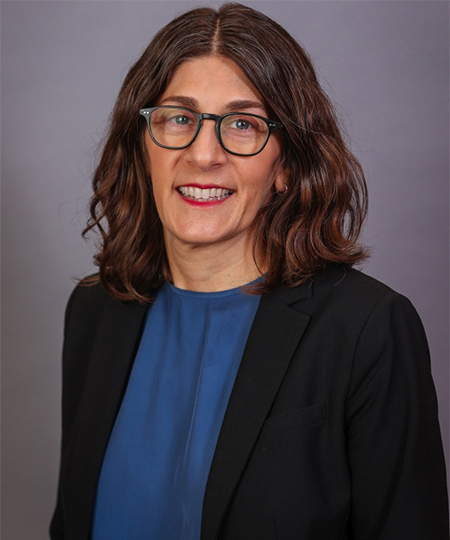

Member of the Ohio House of Representatives from the 28th district
- Incumbent
- Assumed office January 1, 2025
- Preceded by: Jodi Whitted

Personal details
- Party: Democratic
- Spouse: John Brownlee
- Children: 3
- Education: University of Michigan (BA); Northern Kentucky University (MSW)

Karen Brownlee is an American social worker and politician who has served as a Democratic member of the Ohio House of Representatives since 2025. Representing the 28th district, Brownlee's constituency includes the northeastern suburbs of Hamilton County.

== Early life and career ==
Brownlee earned a Bachelor of Art in Russian Language and Literature from the University of Michigan in 1995, and a Master of Social Work from Northern Kentucky University in 2018. She has previously worked as a mental health therapist and clinical trainer.

In 2023, Brownlee challenged incumbent Republican Phil Beck for Trustee of Symmes Township, Ohio, losing by a margin of 59.7% to 40.3%.

== Ohio House of Representatives ==
In 2024, following Ohio’s 2023 redistricting, which moved appointed incumbent Jodi Whitted into the 27th District, Brownlee ran unopposed in the Democratic primary for the open 28th District seat. She defeated anti-abortion activist Jenn Giroux in the November general election with 55.9% of the vote and was sworn in on January 1, 2025. Brownlee currently serves on the Children and Human Services, Community Revitalization, and Health committees.
