= Jonathan Dever =

American politician

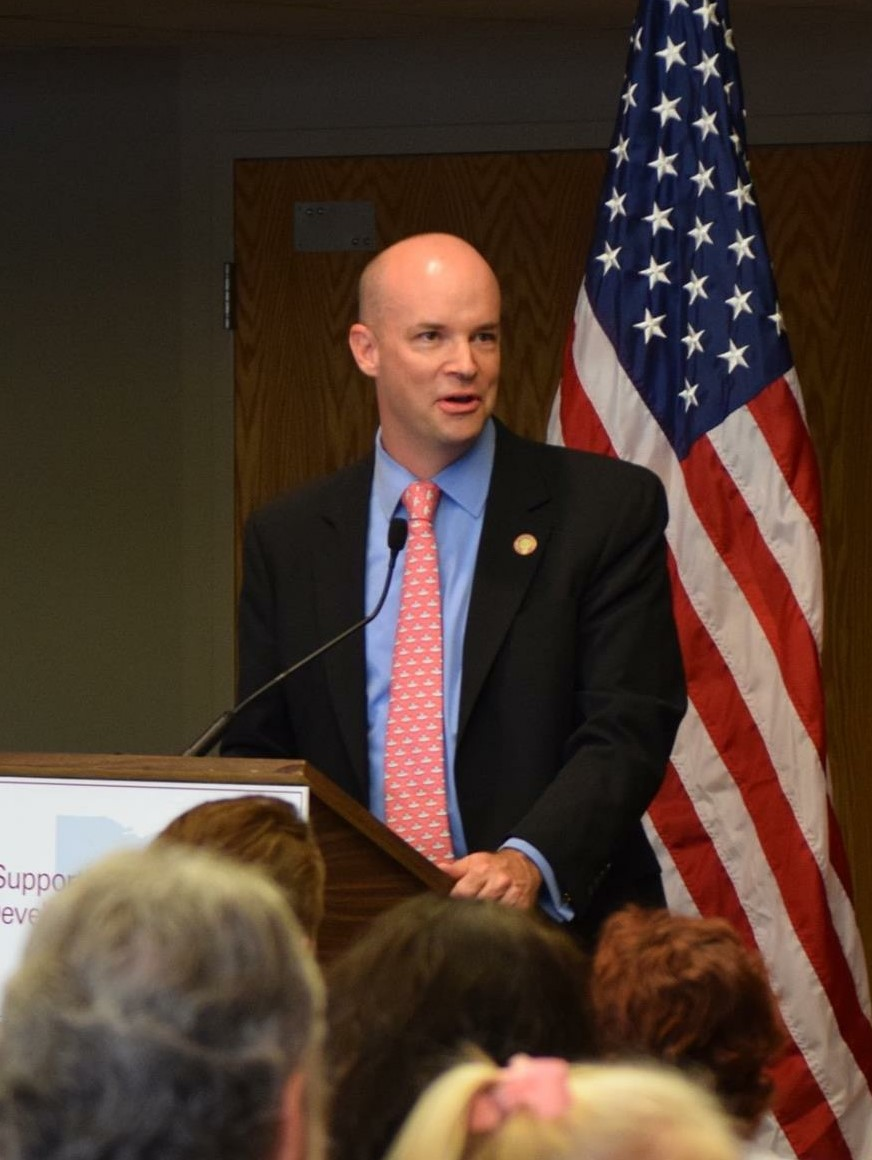

Member of the Ohio House of Representatives from the 28th district
- In office January 6, 2015 – December 31, 2018
- Preceded by: Connie Pillich
- Succeeded by: Jessica Miranda

Chairman Financial Institutions Housing and Urban Development
- In office May 2016 – December 31, 2018

Personal details
- Party: Republican
- Spouse: Martha
- Education: University of Cincinnati; Indiana U. of Pennsylvania; Capital University Law School

Jonathan Dever is an American politician who previously served as a member in the Ohio House of Representatives.

== Early life and education ==
Dever was raised in Montgomery, Ohio and went on to graduate with a BA from University of Cincinnati where he was a member of the Phi Delta Theta fraternity. Later, he earned a master's degree in Industrial Labor Relations from Indiana University of Pennsylvania, and subsequently earned his Juris Doctor from Capital University Law School.

== Political career ==
=== Ohio House of Representatives ===
In 2014, Dever ran for the Ohio House of Representatives in the 28th district, which had been represented by Democrat Connie Pillich for the prior six years. In a close primary, Dever won by 66 votes. He would go on to face Democrat Micah Kamrass, in what would be one of the closest watched state House races of the cycle.

He served as Chairman of the Ohio House Financial Institutions.

He served as Chairman of the Ohio House Financial Institutions, Housing and Urban Development Committee, as a member of Civil Justice and Public Utilities Committees, the Ohio ABLE Program Advisory Board, Ohio Commission on African American Males, Council of State Governments – BILLD Steering Committee, Hamilton County Transportation Improvement District, Ohio Minority Development Financing Advisory Board, and the Ohio Rail Development Commission.

=== The Ohio ABLE ACT and Disability Policy ===
The Ohio ABLE Act, creating ABLE accounts, was the first of its kind state program which allows those with a qualifying disability to save for their disability expenses into a 529(a) savings account. Dever introduced legislation making Ohio the first state in the nation to pass this legislation.

Dever worked to remove the term "mentally retarded" from the Ohio Revised Code and its State documents.

=== Drug policy ===
Dever advocated for funding to double the treatment options in Hamilton County. He sponsored legislation to treat heroin, cocaine, and crack cocaine the same when it comes to punishing drug traffickers. Prior to this change in law, heroin was treated similar to marijuana trafficking.

=== Banking, housing, and consumer protection ===
Dever introduced legislation creating the DOLLAR Deed in Ohio. This allows a homeowner to stay in their home as a tenant when facing foreclosure rather than being put out on the street. DOLLAR stands for Deed Over your property in exchange for a Lender Lease and an Agreed Repurchase. He also introduced HB 463 which revised Ohio's foreclosure processes, addressing blight, vacancy, and abandonment.

== Consumer Financial Protection Bureau ==
In January 2018, Dever was rumored to be on the short list to lead the Consumer Financial Protection Bureau (CFPB), the leading federal consumer watchdog agency. The post was vacated by Richard Cordray, who left the post to pursue the Democratic nomination for Governor of Ohio.

== Political campaigns ==
=== 2018 Campaign ===
In his campaign for a third term, Dever again faced Democrat Jessica Miranda. On election night, Dever led by 303 votes. After provisional ballots counted as part of a closely watched recount, Miranda was declared the victor by a 56-vote margin.
