= Casey Kozlowski =

American politician

Member of the Ohio House of Representatives from the 99th district
- In office January 3, 2011-December 31, 2012
- Preceded by: Deborah Newcomb
- Succeeded by: John Patterson

Personal details
- Born: March 31, 1987 (age 39) Pierpont, Ohio
- Party: Republican
- Education: Pymatuning Valley High School, Ohio University
- Profession: Businessman

Casey Kozlowski (born March 31, 1987) is currently serving as an Ashtabula County Commissioner and is a former Republican member of the Ohio House of Representatives for the 99th district. He was elected in November 2010 and served one term during the 129th General Assembly. He sponsored seven pieces of legislation, of which, four bills were signed into law by Governor Kasich. He lost reelection in 2012.

On January 22, 2014, Kozlowski announced that he would be seeking the office of Ashtabula County Commissioner. Kozlowski made his candidacy public after the incumbent commissioner announced he would not be seeking re-election.

Kozlowski ran in the November general election against Democratic Party candidate Stephen McClure and Independent candidate Willis Clay. Kozlowski won the election with over 50% of the vote in the three-way race.

Kozlowski graduated from Pymatuning Valley High School located in Andover, Ohio in 2005 and holds a Bachelor of Science degree in Applied Management from Ohio University.
