= George Distel =

American politician

Executive Director of the Ohio Turnpike Commission
- In office April 2, 2008 – April 1, 2011
- Governor: Ted Strickland; John Kasich
- Preceded by: Gary C. Suhadolnik
- Succeeded by: Richard A. Hodges

Member of the Ohio House of Representatives
- In office January 7, 2003 – March 31, 2008
- Preceded by: Charlie Wilson
- Succeeded by: Deborah Newcomb
- Constituency: 99th district
- In office March 1, 1999 – December 31, 2002
- Preceded by: Ross Boggs
- Succeeded by: Tim Schaffer
- Constituency: 5th district

Personal details
- Born: L. George Distel; May 11, 1952 (age 74) Buffalo, New York, U.S.
- Party: Democratic
- Spouse: Dale Ann
- Children: 3

George Distel is an American politician who served in the Ohio House of Representatives from 1999 to 2008 and as executive director of the Ohio Turnpike Commission from 2008 to 2011.
