= Deborah Newcomb =

American politician

Member of the Ohio House of Representatives from the 99th district
- In office May 21, 2008 – December 31, 2010
- Preceded by: George Distel
- Succeeded by: Casey Kozlowski

Personal details
- Born: March 8, 1954 (age 72) Conneaut, Ohio, U.S.
- Party: Democratic
- Education: Kent State University
- Profession: Embroiderer

Deborah Newcomb (born March 8, 1954) is a Democratic politician who most recently served in the Ohio House of Representatives from 2008 to 2010. A representative for one and one half terms, Newcomb lost reelection in 2010 to Casey Kozlowski by 42 votes.
