= Ralph Cole (Ohio representative) =

American politician and judge

Member of the Ohio House of Representatives from the 5th district
- In office January 3, 1955 – March 1, 1968
- Preceded by: Districts Created
- Succeeded by: Robert D. Schuck

Personal details
- Born: June 12, 1914 Findlay, Ohio, US
- Died: September 2, 1999 (aged 85) Findlay, Ohio, US
- Party: Republican

Ralph Dayton Cole Jr. (June 12, 1914 – September 2, 1999) was a Republican member of the Ohio House of Representatives. A graduate of Williams College and Case Western Reserve University, he was originally elected to an at-large district in 1954 to represent Hancock County, Ohio, and he would go on to serve seven more terms in the House. Throughout his tenure in the legislature, Cole served on various committees in leadership positions, most notably as chairman of the State and Government Committee.

In 1968, Cole was appointed to a judicial seat for the Ohio District Courts of Appeals, and resigned prior to the end of his term. In 1981, Judge Cole also served as chief justice of the Ohio District Courts of Appeals, and also served on the Ohio Supreme Court when a substitute was needed. He would go on to serve for over twenty years, retiring from the bench in 1989.

Following his service in the judiciary, he retired to his hometown of Findlay, Ohio. He died on September 2, 1999.
