= Bill Patmon =

American politician (1946–2026)

Member of the Ohio House of Representatives from the 10th district
- In office January 3, 2011 – December 31, 2018
- Preceded by: Robin Belcher
- Succeeded by: Terrence Upchurch

Member of Cleveland City Council from Ward 8
- In office January 1, 1990 – December 31, 2001
- Preceded by: Jeff Johnson
- Succeeded by: Sabra Pierce Scott

Personal details
- Born: February 13, 1946 Cleveland, Ohio, U.S.
- Died: April 12, 2026 (aged 80)
- Party: Democratic
- Education: Eastern Michigan University
- Profession: Businessman; community consultant

Bill Patmon (February 13, 1946 – April 12, 2026) was an American businessman and politician who was a member of the Ohio House of Representatives, representing the Tenth District from 2011 to 2018.

== Early life and career ==
Patmon grew up in Cleveland and graduated from Eastern Michigan University. Patmon was a member of Cleveland City Council from 1990 to 2001, and served as the chairman of its Finance Committee from 1999 to 2001. Patmon initially was in the running for the Congressional seat available following the death of Stephanie Tubbs Jones, but failed to gain momentum. In 2009, he ran for mayor of Cleveland, but lost to Frank G. Jackson.

== Ohio House of Representatives ==
After winning a crowded primary in May 2010 for Ohio's 10th House District which included incumbent Robin Belcher, he ran unopposed in the general election in what to many is considered the safest Democratic State House district. Patmon was sworn into his first term on January 3, 2011, and served as a member of the Education Committee, the State Government and Elections Committee, and the Transportation, Public Safety and Homeland Security Committee.

In 2012, Patmon won reelection to his seat unopposed. He sat on the House Transportation, Public Safety, and Homeland Security Committee, the Ways and Means Committee, and the State and Local Government Committee.

Patmon is known for having introduced several pieces of legislation in his first term with a counted eighteen bills that ranged in topics from education to healthcare. Patmon also introduced legislation for specialty license plates that highlight Cleveland as the starting point for Superman, to celebrate Superman's 75th anniversary in 2013, and to acknowledge Jerry Siegel and Joe Shuster as the co-creators of the best-known superhero in the world.

He saw much success in his second term as State Representative including the passage of House Bill 147, also known as the Lizzie B. Byrd Act, named in honor of his mother who was diagnosed with breast cancer. Patmon has expressed openly his experiences as he watched his mother face her diagnosis and subsequent reluctance over cancer treatment options expressing that "It stung. It stung deep." The legislation, signed into law on December 19, 2014, requires physicians to present patients with all possible options upfront and to ensure that patients know that breast cancer reconstructive surgery can be covered by health insurance.

As the Representative for inner Cleveland, Patmon was against allowing concealed carry of guns in restaurants, bars and stadiums, notably Cleveland Browns Stadium.

A conservative Democrat, Patmon opposed abortion.

== Death ==
Patmon died on April 12, 2026, at the age of 80.
