= Sarah Fowler Arthur =

American politician

Member of the Ohio House of Representatives from the 99th district
- Incumbent
- Assumed office January 4, 2021
- Preceded by: John Patterson

Personal details
- Born: 1987 or 1988 (age 37–38)
- Party: Republican

Sarah Fowler Arthur (born 1987 or 1988) is an American politician currently serving as the Ohio state representative in Ohio's 99th district. The district includes parts of Ashtabula County and Geauga County.

== Biography ==
Fowler Arthur was home-schooled. She worked on her family's farm and ran a small business that sold eggs for twelve years. She is married to YouTuber Isaac Arthur.

== Vote on expulsion of Larry Householder ==
During the 134th Ohio General Assembly, Sarah Fowler Arthur voted against the expulsion of former Ohio House Speaker Larry Householder. At the time of the vote, Householder had been federally indicted in connection with the Ohio nuclear bribery scandal, which centered on the passage of House Bill 6. The Ohio House of Representatives voted 75–21 to expel Householder, with Arthur among the 21 Republican members who opposed the resolution.

== Political career ==
Fowler Arthur was elected to the Ohio State Board of Education in November 2012 to serve a term ending in December 2014. According to the Akron Beacon Journal, she "had no formal relationship with organized, publicly funded education" prior to her election to the Board of Education. The seat, which was uncontested in the previous election two years before, represents part of Akron, half of Summit County, and almost all of Portage County, Trumbull County, Mahoning County, and Lake County. Fowler Arthur was re-elected twice and served in the position until she was elected to the Ohio House of Representatives in 2020.

Fowler Arthur ran for a seat in the House of Representatives after incumbent Democrat John Patterson became term-limited after completing his fourth term in 2020. She defeated Democratic candidate Richard Dana and write-in candidate Kyle Bruckman, winning 58.5% to 41.2% to 0.3%, thus flipping the district from Democratic to Republican. The district includes parts of Ashtabula County and Geauga County.

In March 2022, Fowler Arthur stated that the history of the Holocaust should be taught from multiple perspectives, saying "Maybe you’re [learning about the Holocaust] from the perspective of a Jewish person that has gone through the tragedies that took place. And maybe you’ll listen to it from the perspective of a German soldier.” Fowler Arthur was criticized for her statements by other politicians and by members of the Jewish community in Ohio.

During the 134th Ohio General Assembly, Sarah Fowler Arthur voted against the expulsion of former House Speaker Larry Householder, who had been federally indicted and later convicted in connection with the Ohio nuclear bribery scandal tied to House Bill 6. The Ohio House voted 75–21 to expel Householder, with Sarah Fowler Arthur among the 21 Republican members who opposed the resolution.
