= John Scott (Ohio politician) =

American politician

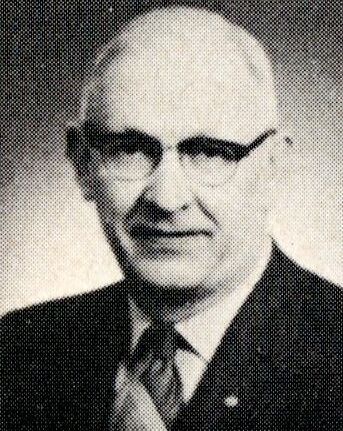

Member of the Ohio House of Representatives from the 63rd district
- In office January 3, 1969-December 31, 1976
- Preceded by: Herman Ankeney
- Succeeded by: Jim Zehner

Personal details
- Party: Republican

John Scott is Republican politician who formerly served in the Ohio House of Representatives. A native of Fairborn, Ohio, Scott initially ran for the Ohio House when long serving incumbent Herman Ankeney opted to not seek reelection in 1968. He was sworn into his first term on January 3, 1969.

While in office, he headed a subcommittee that drafted legislation founding the Ohio Environmental Protection Agency, and sponsored bills that would penalize the state Medicaid system for late payments to doctors and that would make state board of education districts coincide with congressional districts.

In 1976, Scott opted to not seek reelection, and was succeeded by Jim Zehner.
