= Herman Ankeney =

American politician (1894–1968)

Member of the Ohio House of Representatives from the 10th district
- In office January 3, 1953-December 31, 1968
- Preceded by: District Created
- Succeeded by: John Scott

Personal details
- Born: October 14, 1894 Beavercreek Township, Ohio
- Died: March 6, 1968 (aged 73) Cincinnati, Ohio
- Party: Republican

Herman Kline Ankeney (October 14, 1894 – March 6, 1968) was a Republican politician who formerly served in the Ohio House of Representatives. A member of a prominent family from Xenia, Ohio, Ankeney initially won election to the Ohio House in 1952, to an at-large district for Greene County. He would win reelection five more times to represent the county.

In 1966, the Voting Rights Act of 1965 allotted population based districts, and Ankeney won election to the newly drawn 10th District. However, he opted not to run in 1968. Following his time in the legislature, he returned to his family company in Beavercreek, Ohio.

Herman K. Ankeney Middle School in Beavercreek is named in his honor.
