= Robin Belcher =

American politician (born 1976)

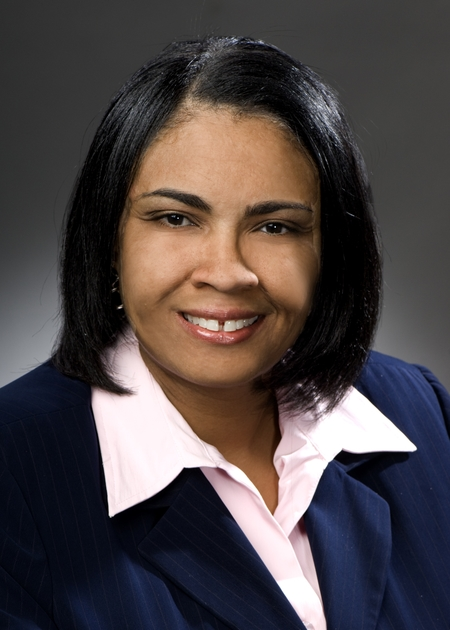

Member of the Ohio House of Representatives from the 10th district
- In office March 16, 2009-December 31, 2010
- Preceded by: Eugene Miller
- Succeeded by: Bill Patmon

Personal details
- Born: August 1, 1976 (age 50) Cleveland, Ohio
- Party: Democratic
- Education: Bowling Green State University, Ohio State University, University of Missouri
- Profession: Prosecutor, Human Rights Investigator

Robin Belcher (born August 1, 1976) is a former Democratic member of the Ohio House of Representatives, representing the 10th District from May 2009 to December 2010. She was appointed to the seat when Eugene Miller left to fill a vacancy on Cleveland City Council.

Belcher earned a bachelor’s degree in political science from Bowling Green State University, Master’s degree in Public Administration from Ohio State University and a law degree from the University of Missouri in Columbia, Missouri.
