= Michael Curtin =

American politician

Michael F. Curtin

Member of the Ohio House of Representatives from the 17th district
- In office January 6, 2013 – December 31, 2016
- Preceded by: Inaugural holder
- Succeeded by: Adam Miller

Personal details
- Party: Democratic
- Spouse: Sharon
- Education: Bishop Watterson High School; Ohio State University School of Journalism
- Profession: journalist, legislator, author

Michael F. "Mike" Curtin is a former Democratic member of the Ohio House of Representatives for the 17th district. He retired from The Dispatch Printing Company, the publisher of The Columbus Dispatch. He first joined the newspaper in 1973 as a reporter. He began covering the Ohio legislature as a reporter in 1982, and subsequently became public affairs editor and managing editor before retiring as associate publisher emeritus in 2007. He decided to run for the 17th district when he noticed that a redistricting left it without an incumbent. He was unopposed in the Democratic primary. In the general election he was opposed by Republican Nicholas A. Szabo, who he defeated with 62.6% of the vote. He was re-elected in 2014 after defeating Republican Mike Newbern, 55% to 45%.

== Works ==
- The Ohio Politics Almanac (1996)
