= Marlene Anielski =

American politician (born 1961)

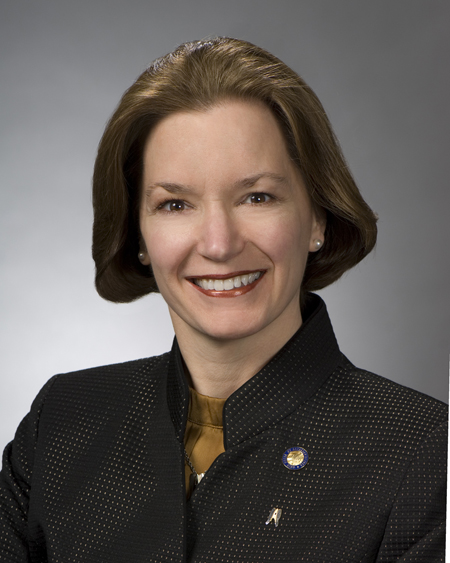

Member of the Ohio House of Representatives from the 6th district
- In office January 7, 2013 – December 31, 2018
- Preceded by: Randy Gardner
- Succeeded by: Phil Robinson

Member of the Ohio House of Representatives from the 17th district
- In office January 3, 2011-December 31, 2012
- Preceded by: Josh Mandel
- Succeeded by: Michael Curtin

Personal details
- Born: November 25, 1961 (age 64) Cleveland, Ohio, U.S.
- Party: Republican
- Education: University of Akron; Cleveland State University
- Profession: Legislator

Marlene Anielski (born November 25, 1961) is a former member of the Ohio House of Representatives who represented the Sixth District. Prior to redistricting, she was first elected to represent the Seventeenth District in 2010. She is a Republican. Marlene now works as a realtor for Pro Edge Realty in Medina, OH.

== Career ==
A graduate of the University of Akron and Cleveland State University, Anielski was Mayor of Walton Hills, Ohio from 2000–2010, and served two years prior on the city council.

== Ohio House of Representatives ==
After Josh Mandel decided to vacate his seat in the Ohio House of Representatives to run for Ohio State Treasurer, Anielski won the uncontested District 17 Republican primary election in May, 2010. She went on to win the general election in November, 2010 with 54.75% of the vote. Democrat Kelli Perk won 39.69% and Libertarian David Macko earned 5.56%.

In the campaign, Anielski gained press when she quit a pro-gun control group, Mayors Against Illegal Guns, which she said shifted blame from criminals to law-abiding gun owners.

Anielski was sworn into her first term on January 3, 2011. Soon after, Speaker of the House William G. Batchelder named her as a member of the Economic and Small Business Development Committee, the Education Committee, the Finance and Appropriations Committee and the Public Utilities Committee. She is also a member of the Joint Committee on Bingo and Skill Based Gaming.

In 2012, Anielski was redistricted into the 6th district. She was unopposed in the March primary, and won reelection to the state house with 55.52% of the vote over Democrat Anthony Fossaceca.

== Initiatives and positions ==
Anielski and fellow representative Nan Baker have sponsored legislation initiated by Ohio Attorney General Mike DeWine that would enable regulators to oversee electronic sweepstakes and other "skill-based" games. The legislation is in part a response to the newly enabled casinos that are coming to Toledo, Columbus, Cincinnati and Cleveland. She has stated that current law allows many of the businesses that provide the services to get around paying taxes. The proposed legislation regulates Internet sweepstake cafes, which many say abuse a loophole in state gambling law.

Anielski was one of only two Republicans to oppose legislation that set forth to allow for drilling for oil and natural gas in state parks and other state owned lands.
