= John Patterson (Ohio state representative) =

American politician

Member of the Ohio House of Representatives from the 99th district
- In office January 7, 2013 – December 31, 2020
- Preceded by: Casey Kozlowski
- Succeeded by: Sarah Fowler Arthur

Personal details
- Born: July 7, 1956 (age 70) Ashtabula, Ohio, U.S.
- Party: Democratic
- Education: Marietta College
- Profession: Educator

John Patterson (born July 7, 1956) is a former member of the Ohio House of Representatives. He won election to the 99th District in 2012 (taking office in January, 2013) and won reelection in 2014, 2016, and 2018. His district includes most of Ashtabula County and parts of Geauga County, including the City of Chardon.

== Life and career ==
Patterson is the son of a chiropractor and a homemaker. He graduated from Jefferson Area High School in 1974. He attended Marietta College, where he was an assistant coach for the baseball team.

Following graduation, Patterson became a baseball coach at Kent State University and also worked for the Ohio Department of Transportation and as a truck driver. He later would become a teacher, and taught history at Jefferson Area High School for thirty years. Patterson and his wife Nancy reside in Jefferson, Ohio and they have two sons.

== Ohio House of Representatives ==
In 2012, Patterson opted to take on Representative Casey Kozlowski, who had won by only forty-two votes in 2010. Unopposed in the Democratic primary, he went on to defeat Kozlowski with 52.78% of the vote.
