= Richard Brown (Ohio politician) =

American politician from Ohio

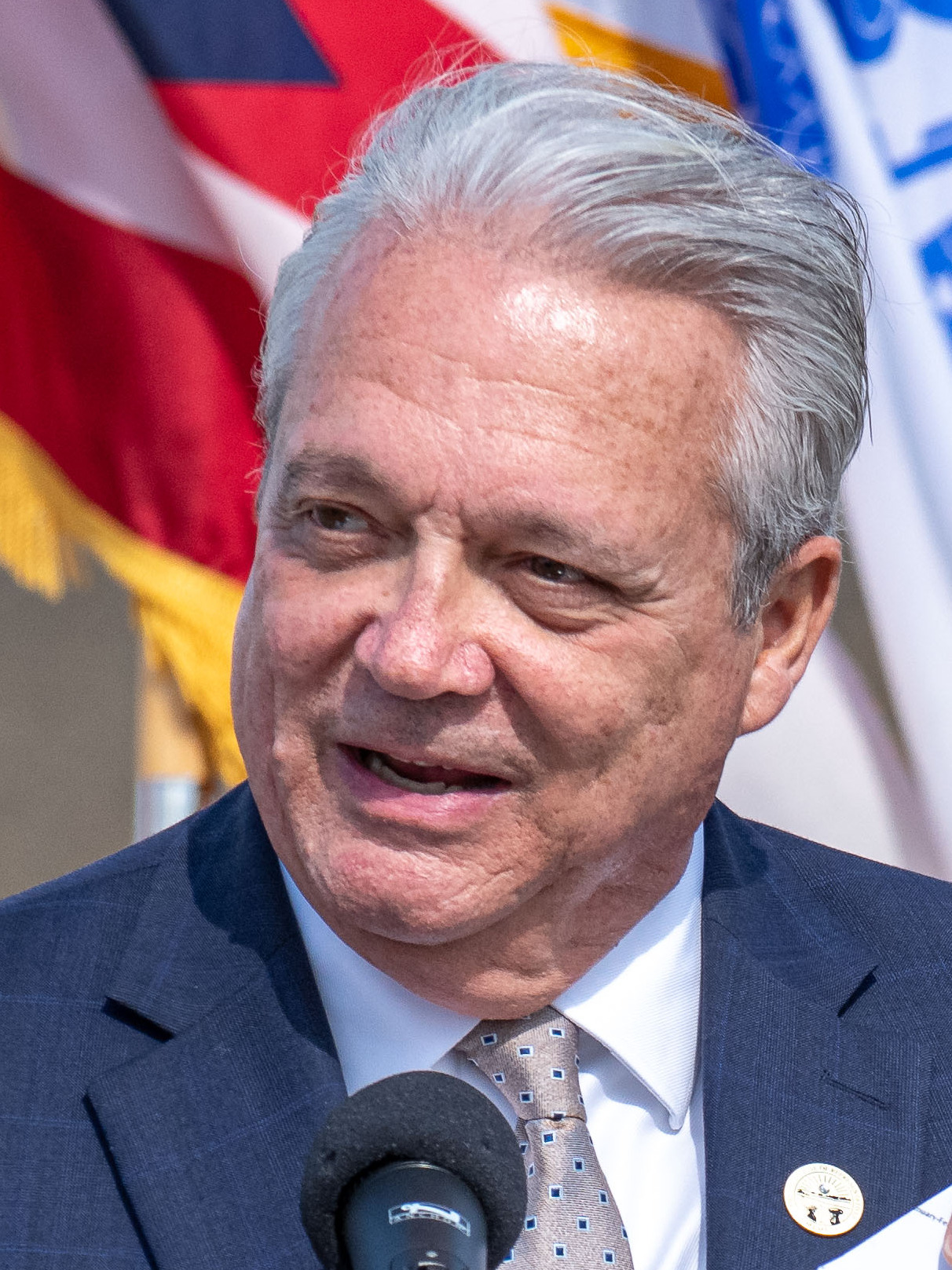
- Brown in 2023

Member of the Ohio House of Representatives from the 5th district
- Incumbent
- Assumed office June 28, 2017
- Preceded by: Heather Bishoff

Personal details
- Party: Democratic
- Spouse: Suzanne
- Education: University of Cincinnati (BA); Ohio State University (JD)
- Occupation: Attorney

Richard Brown is an American attorney and politician who served as a state representative from the Ohio House of Representatives.

== Ohio House of Representatives ==
=== Appointment and reelection ===
When former Rep. Heather Bishoff left the General Assembly in the summer of 2017, Brown opted to seek the appointment to replace her. Bishoff resigned from the 20th House District abruptly in April of that year, saying she planned to move to California to focus on the financial services business she started with her husband.

Brown was among nine candidates eventually interviewed to replace her by House Democrats, who had the authority to appoint a replacement. Ultimately, he was selected, and seated on June 28, 2017. On November 6, 2018, Brown was reelected to a full two-year term, winning 59% of the vote over Republican candidate Bobby Mitchell.

=== Committees ===
Brown serves on the following committees: Armed Services and Criminal Justice, Civil Justice, and Insurance.

== Election history ==
Ohio House 20th District
Year	Democrat	Votes	Pct	Republican	Votes	Pct
2018	Richard Brown	26,751	58.5%	Bobby Mitchell	18,992	41.5%
2020	Richard Brown	36,330	59.3%	Chris Baer	24,928	40.7%

Ohio House 5th District
Year	Democrat	Votes	Pct	Republican	Votes	Pct
2022	Richard Brown	17,429	50.2%	Ronald Beach IV	17,284	49.8%

== Personal life ==
Brown is a graduate of Ironton High School.

Ohio House of Representatives
Preceded by Heather Bishoff	Ohio House of Representatives, 20th District; 2017–2022	Succeeded by Terrence Upchurch
Preceded by Tim Ginter	Ohio House of Representatives, 5th District; 2023–2024	Succeeded by Meredith Lawson‐Rowe
