= Valleyview, Ohio =

- Village
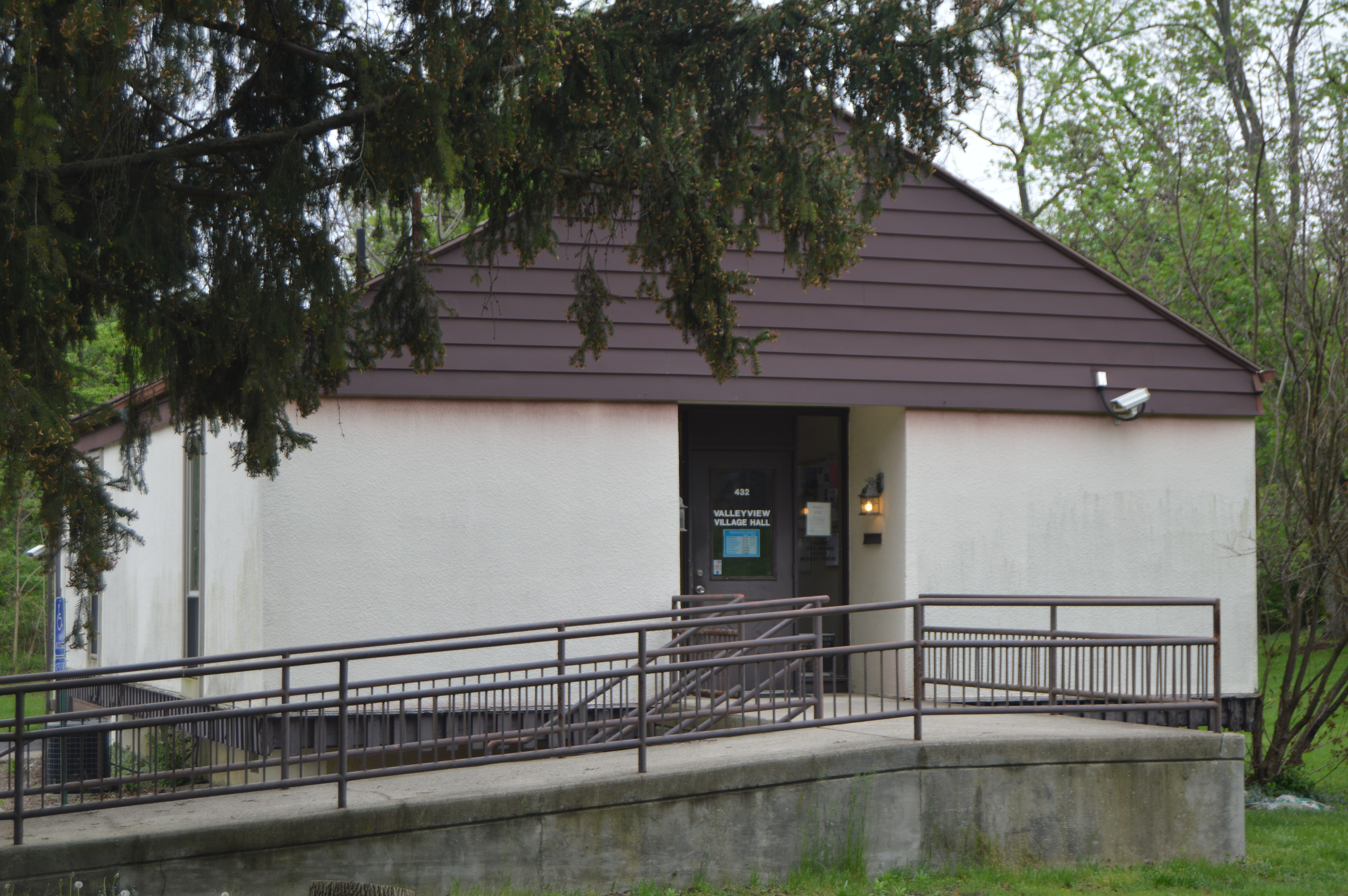
- Village Hall

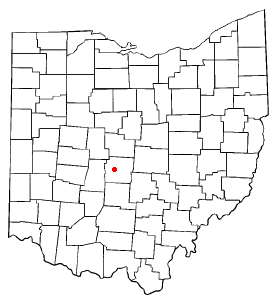
- Location of Valleyview, Ohio

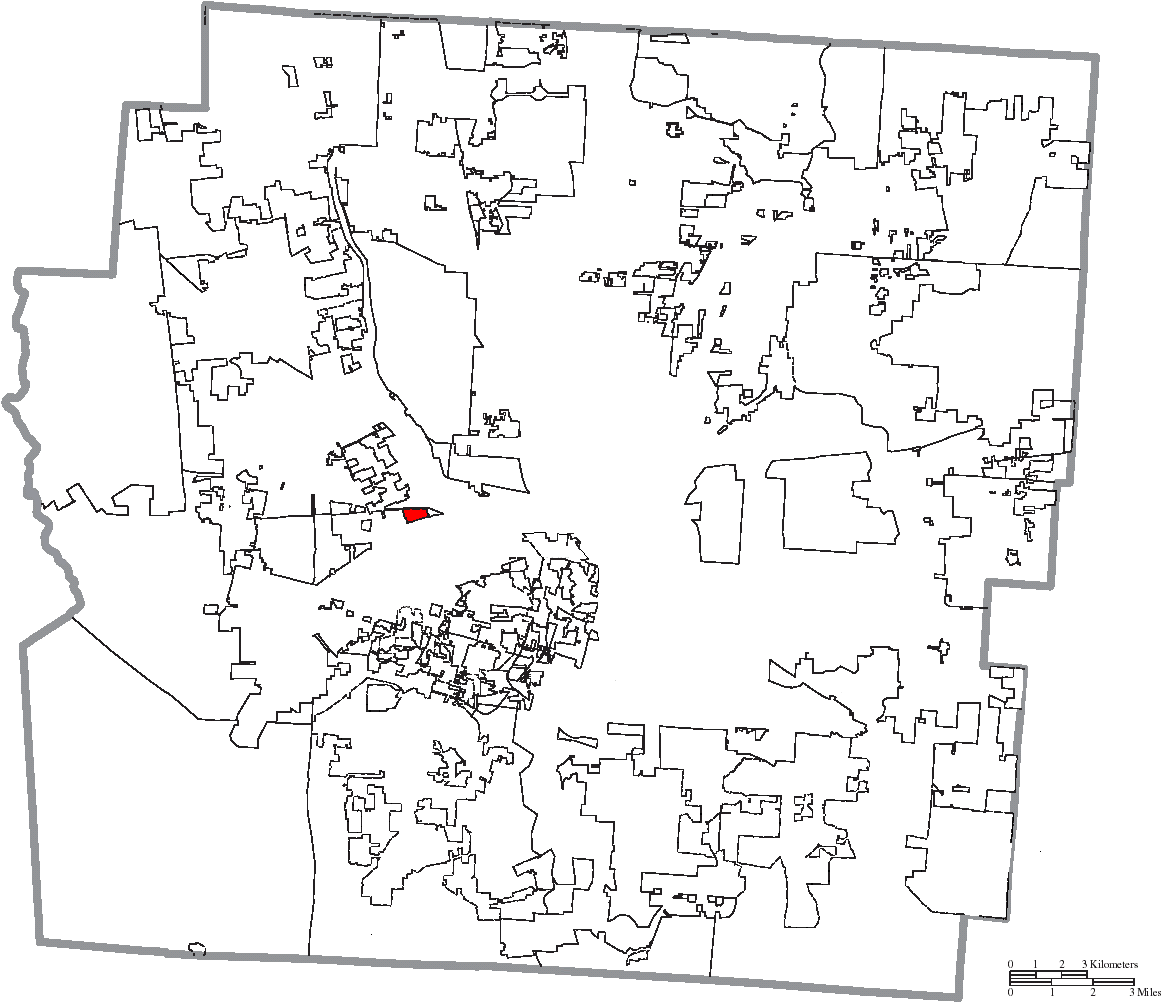
- Location of Valleyview in Franklin County
- Coordinates: 39°57′52″N 83°04′23″W
- Country: United States
- State: Ohio
- County: Franklin

Area
  - Total: 0.15 sq mi (0.38 km^{2})
  - Land: 0.14 sq mi (0.37 km^{2})
  - Water: 0.0039 sq mi (0.01 km^{2})
- Elevation: 787 ft (240 m)

Population (2020)
  - Total: 669
  - Density: 4,689.3/sq mi (1,810.53/km^{2})
- Time zone: UTC-5 (Eastern (EST))
  - Summer (DST): UTC-4 (EDT)
- ZIP code: 43204
- Area code: 614
- FIPS code: 39-79282
- GNIS feature ID: 2400040
- Website: www.valleyviewohio.org

Valleyview is a village in Franklin County, Ohio, United States. The population was 669 at the 2020 census.

== History ==
On September 10, 2024, Valleyview withdrew from Franklin Township by forming a paper township named Valleyview Township.

== Geography ==
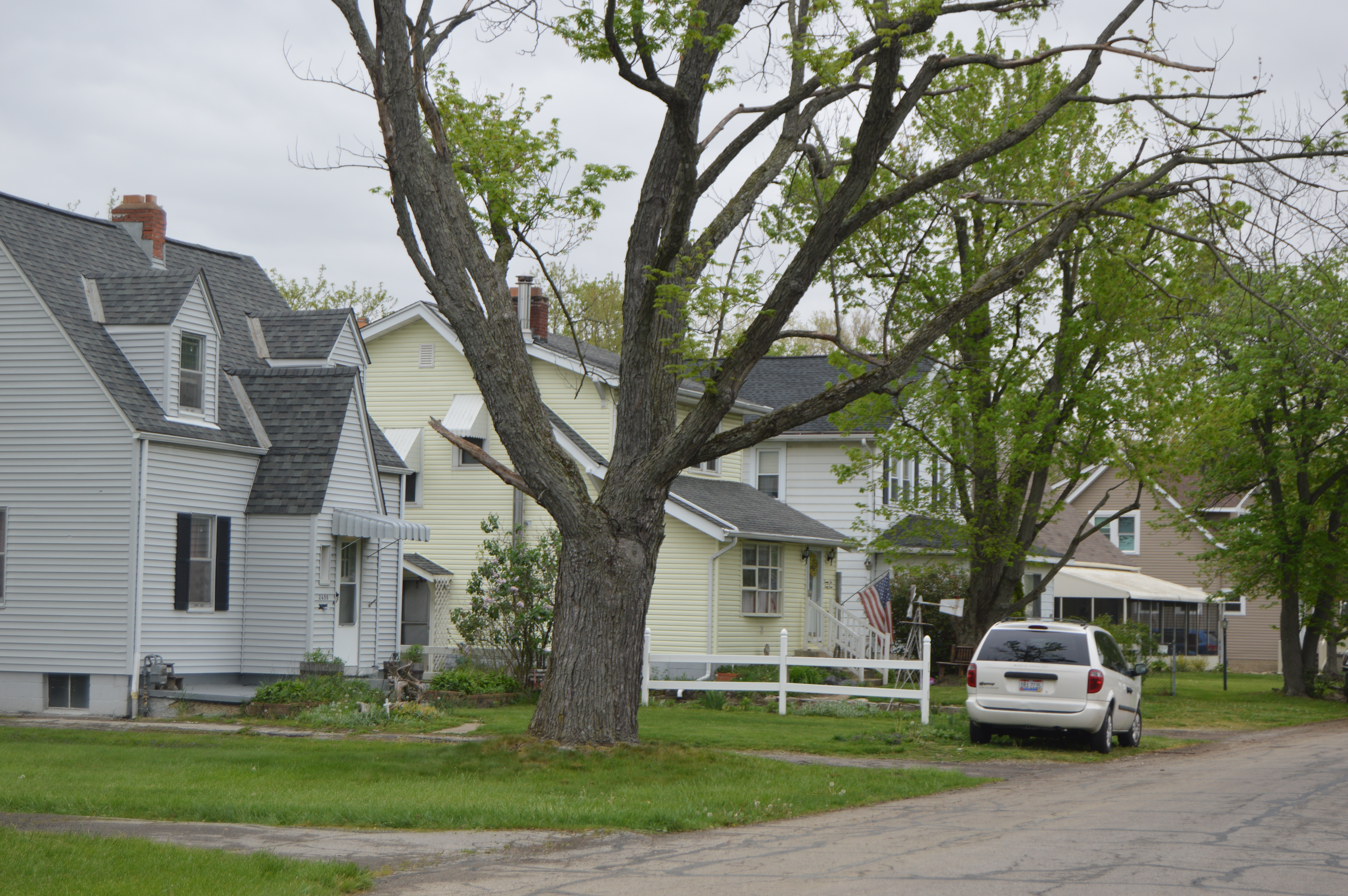
Houses on Elliott Avenue

According to the United States Census Bureau, the village has a total area of 0.15 square miles (0.39 km^{2}), all land.

The villages of Valleyview, Marble Cliff, Minerva Park and Riverlea, and the cities of Bexley, Grandview Heights, Upper Arlington and Whitehall are enclaves of Columbus.

== Demographics ==
Historical population
Census	Pop.	Note	%±
1950	611		—
1960	790		29.3%
1970	909		15.1%
1980	730		−19.7%
1990	604		−17.3%
2000	601		−0.5%
2010	620		3.2%
2020	669		7.9%
U.S. Decennial Census 2020

=== 2010 census ===
At the 2010 census there were 620 people, 246 households, and 148 families living in the village. The population density was 4,133.3 inhabitants per square mile (1,595.9/km^{2}). There were 266 housing units at an average density of 1,773.3 per square mile (684.7/km^{2}). The racial makeup of the village was 90.0% White, 5.0% African American, 0.3% Native American, 0.8% Asian, 1.0% Pacific Islander, 1.9% from other races, and 1.0% from two or more races. Hispanic or Latino of any race were 4.4%.

Of the 246 households 30.9% had children under the age of 18 living with them, 37.4% were married couples living together, 13.8% had a female householder with no husband present, 8.9% had a male householder with no wife present, and 39.8% were non-families. 28.0% of households were one person and 12.2% were one person aged 65 or older. The average household size was 2.52 and the average family size was 3.07.

The median age in the village was 39.4 years. 23.1% of residents were under the age of 18; 9% were between the ages of 18 and 24; 26.4% were from 25 to 44; 28.9% were from 45 to 64; and 12.6% were 65 or older. The gender makeup of the village was 49.7% male and 50.3% female.

=== 2000 census ===
At the 2000 census there were 601 people, 258 households, and 168 families living in the village. The population density was 3,957.6 inhabitants per square mile (1,528.0/km^{2}). There were 267 housing units at an average density of 1,758.2 per square mile (678.8/km^{2}). The racial makeup of the village was 96.17% White, 1.00% African American, 0.17% Native American, 2.33% Asian, and 0.33% from two or more races. Hispanic or Latino of any race were 0.17%.

Of the 258 households 24.8% had children under the age of 18 living with them, 52.3% were married couples living together, 8.9% had a female householder with no husband present, and 34.5% were non-families. 28.7% of households were one person and 11.6% were one person aged 65 or older. The average household size was 2.33 and the average family size was 2.86.

The age distribution was 21.5% under the age of 18, 5.2% from 18 to 24, 31.6% from 25 to 44, 26.5% from 45 to 64, and 15.3% 65 or older. The median age was 40 years. For every 100 females there were 90.2 males. For every 100 females age 18 and over, there were 90.3 males.

The median household income was $39,554 and the median family income was $45,455. Males had a median income of $31,842 versus $27,417 for females. The per capita income for the village was $19,445. About 3.0% of families and 5.7% of the population were below the poverty line, including 11.2% of those under age 18 and 4.0% of those age 65 or over.
