= Phil Robinson (politician) =

American politician (born 1980)

Member of the Ohio House of Representatives from the 19th district
- Incumbent
- Assumed office 2023
- Preceded by: Mary Lightbody

Member of the Ohio House of Representatives from the 6th district
- In office January 1, 2019 – 2023
- Preceded by: Marlene Anielski
- Succeeded by: Adam Miller

Personal details
- Born: December 28, 1980 (age 45) Ohio, U.S.
- Party: Democratic
- Education: George Washington University (BA); Case Western Reserve University (MBA)
- Occupation: Non-profit executive

Phillip Martin Robinson Jr. (born December 28, 1980) is a non-profit executive and American politician who is a member of the Ohio House of Representatives from the 19th district in Cuyahoga County. He formerly represented in the Ohio House the 6th district.

== Early life and education ==
Robinson attended Gilmour Academy in Gates Mill, Ohio, and later earned an undergraduate degree in finance from George Washington University in Washington, D.C. He also received an Executive Master of Business Administration from Case Western Reserve University Weatherhead School of Management.

== Career ==
Robinson's first role in political life was as a congressional aide for U.S. Sen. Dianne Feinstein. He has also served as executive director of City Year Cleveland.

== Ohio House of Representatives ==
=== Election ===
Robinson was elected in the general election on November 6, 2018, winning 51 percent of the vote over 49 percent of Republican candidate Jim Trakas, flipping the seat from Republican control to Democratic control.

=== Committees ===
Robinson serves on the following committees: Primary and Secondary Education, Public Utilities, Ways and Means, and Joint Education Oversight Committee.

== Personal life ==
Robinson is the brother of comedian Phoebe Robinson.

== Election results ==
Ohio House 6th District
Year	Democrat	Votes	Pct	Republican	Votes	Pct
2018	Phil Robinson	31,048	51.33%	Jim Trakas	29,434	48.67%
2020	Phil Robinson	37,995	51.36%	Shay Hawkins	35,982	48.63%
