= Franklin Township, Franklin County, Ohio =

Township in Ohio, US

- Township
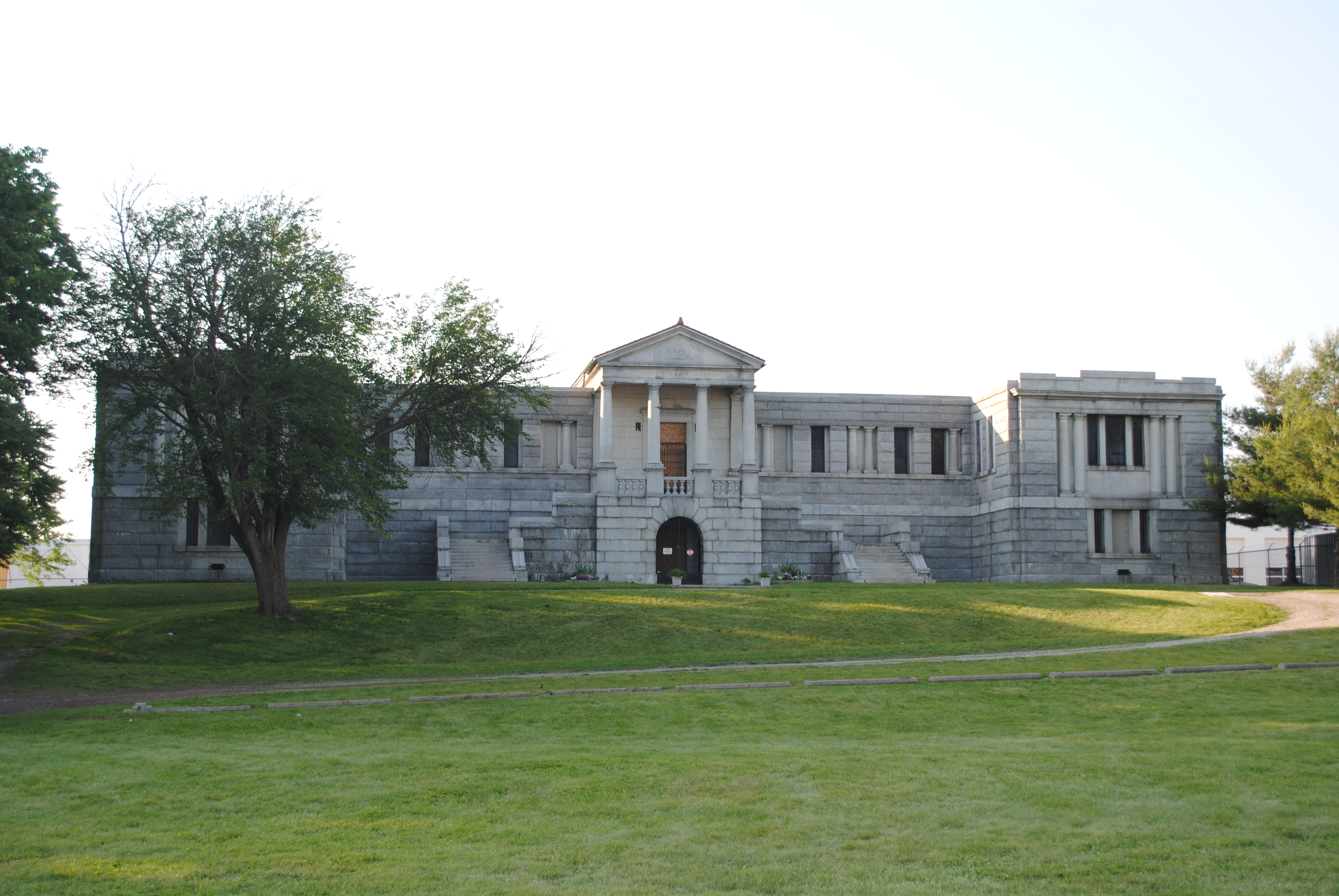
- Green Lawn Abbey, built 1927

- Location of Franklin Township in Franklin County
- Coordinates: 39°55′57″N 83°3′53″W
- Country: United States
- State: Ohio
- County: Franklin

Area
  - Total: 7.1 sq mi (18 km^{2})
  - Land: 7.0 sq mi (18 km^{2})
  - Water: 0.2 sq mi (0.52 km^{2})
- Elevation: 804 ft (245 m)

Population (2020)
  - Total: 11,502
  - Density: 1,600/sq mi (630/km^{2})
- Time zone: UTC-5 (Eastern (EST))
  - Summer (DST): UTC-4 (EDT)
- FIPS code: 39-28280
- GNIS feature ID: 1086102
- Website: https://franklin-townshipohio.gov/

Franklin Township is one of the seventeen townships of Franklin County, Ohio, United States. The 2020 census found 11,502 people in the township.

== Geography ==
Located in west central Franklin County, the township consists of many small "islands" separated from each other by municipal annexations. With few exceptions, these islands are completely surrounded by the city of Columbus. Some southern islands border Jackson Township, while a large island in the west borders Prairie Township.

Most of what was originally Franklin Township has been annexed by the city of Columbus, the county seat of Franklin County. Other parts are now incorporated into the city of Grandview Heights in the northwest, the village of Marble Cliff in the north, and the village of Valleyview in the south.

== Name and history ==
It is one of twenty-one Franklin Townships statewide. Franklin Township was organized in 1804.

== Government ==
The township is governed by a three-member board of trustees, who are elected in November of odd-numbered years to a four-year term beginning on the following January 1. Two are elected in the year after the presidential election and one is elected in the year before it. There is also an elected township fiscal officer, who serves a four-year term beginning on April 1 of the year after the election, which is held in November of the year before the presidential election. Vacancies in the fiscal officership or on the board of trustees are filled by the remaining trustees.

== Education ==
While most of the township attends South-Western City Schools, some areas are in the Hilliard City School District and the Columbus City School District.
