= Terrence Upchurch =

American politician (born 1988)

Member of the Ohio House of Representatives from the 20th district
- Incumbent
- Assumed office January 1, 2019
- Preceded by: Bill Patmon

Personal details
- Born: October 17, 1988 (age 37) Cleveland, Ohio, U.S.
- Party: Democratic
- Education: Cleveland State University (BA)

Terrence Vincent Upchurch II (born October 17, 1988) is an American politician serving as a member of the Ohio House of Representatives from the 20th district.

== Early life and education ==
Upchurch was born in Cleveland and raised in the Collinwood and Glenville neighborhoods. He graduated from St. Peter Chanel High School. He earned a Bachelor of Arts degree in political science from Cleveland State University. He is pursuing a Master of Public Administration from Villanova University.

== Career ==
Prior to his election, Upchurch served as a special assistant on the Cleveland City Council. In 2020, Upchurch became an Honorary Co-Chair of Students for Gun Legislation, a 501(c)4 Non-Profit.

After winning the 2018 Democratic primary election on August 7 over seven other candidates, including former Cleveland City Councilmember T.J. Dow, Upchurch was elected unopposed in the general election on November 6, 2018.

Upchurch serves on the Economic and Workforce Development, Health, and Insurance committees.
