= 2016 Ohio House of Representatives election =

- November 8, 2016

All 99 seats of the Ohio House of Representatives 50 seats are needed for a majority
- Turnout: 71.33%
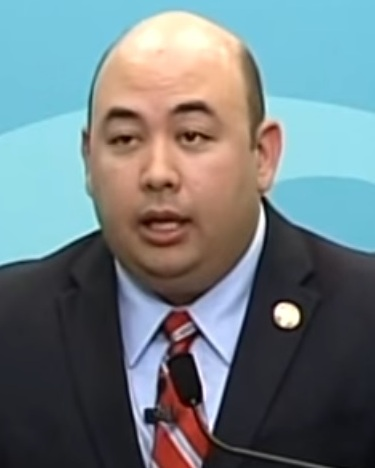

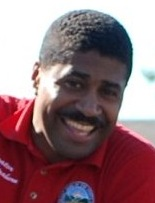
	Majority party	Minority party
Leader	Cliff Rosenberger	Fred Strahorn
Party	Republican	Democratic
Leader since	January 5, 2015	January 5, 2015
Leader's seat	District 91	District 39
Last election	65	34
Seats won	66	33
Seat change	▲1	▼1
Popular vote	2,836,624	1,961,329
Percentage	58.54%	40.47%
- Results; Democratic hold Republican hold Republican gain
Speaker before election
Cliff Rosenberger
Republican
Elected Speaker
Cliff Rosenberger
Republican

An election was held on November 8, 2016 to elect all 99 members to Ohio's House of Representatives. The election coincided with the elections for other offices, including U.S. president, U.S. Senate, U.S. House of Representatives and state senate. The primary election was held on March 15, 2016.

Republicans consolidated their supermajority in the House by gaining one seat, winning 66 seats compared to 33 seats for the Democrats.

== Predictions ==
Source	Ranking	As of
Governing	Likely R	October 12, 2016

== Results ==
=== Statewide ===
Party	Candi- dates	Votes		Seats		
Party	Candi- dates	No.	%	No.	+/–	%
Republican Party	91	2,836,624	58.54%	66	▲1	66.67%
Democratic Party	80	1,961,329	40.47%	33	▼1	33.33%
Independent	4	44,090	0.91%	0	Steady	0.00%
Green Party	1	3,857	0.08%	0	Steady	0.00%
Write-in	5	58	0.00%	0	Steady	0.00%
Total	181	4,845,958	100.00%	99	Steady	100.00%

=== District ===
Results of the 2016 Ohio House of Representatives election by district:

District	Democratic		Republican		Others		Total		Result
District	Votes	%	Votes	%	Votes	%	Votes	%	Result
District 1	-	-	31,342	67.35%	15,195	32.65%	46,537	100.00%	Republican hold
District 2	15,725	30.28%	36,186	69.68%	20	0.04%	51,931	100.00%	Republican hold
District 3	25,131	41.25%	35,795	58.75%	-	-	60,926	100.00%	Republican hold
District 4	-	-	34,564	100.00%	-	-	34,564	100.00%	Republican hold
District 5	12,949	28.89%	31,874	71.11%	-	-	44,823	100.00%	Republican hold
District 6	25,405	38.91%	39,887	61.09%	-	-	65,292	100.00%	Republican hold
District 7	-	-	39,725	100.00%	-	-	39,725	100.00%	Republican hold
District 8	40,634	79.81%	10,280	20.19%	-	-	50,914	100.00%	Democratic hold
District 9	48,085	84.43%	8,870	15.57%	-	-	56,955	100.00%	Democratic hold
District 10	29,633	100.00%	-	-	-	-	29,633	100.00%	Democratic hold
District 11	31,600	85.72%	5,263	14.28%	-	-	36,863	100.00%	Democratic hold
District 12	39,258	100.00%	-	-	-	-	39,258	100.00%	Democratic hold
District 13	28,336	100.00%	-	-	-	-	28,336	100.00%	Democratic hold
District 14	29,380	100.00%	-	-	-	-	29,380	100.00%	Democratic hold
District 15	24,881	100.00%	-	-	-	-	24,881	100.00%	Democratic hold
District 16	26,475	43.69%	34,124	56.31%	-	-	60,599	100.00%	Republican hold
District 17	19,039	54.38%	15,953	45.57%	16	0.05%	35,008	100.00%	Democratic hold
District 18	36,519	65.30%	15,551	27.81%	3,857	6.90%	55,927	100.00%	Democratic hold
District 19	27,131	42.10%	37,312	57.90%	-	-	64,443	100.00%	Republican hold
District 20	29,458	53.67%	25,431	46.33%	-	-	54,889	100.00%	Democratic hold
District 21	26,252	40.83%	38,044	59.17%	-	-	64,296	100.00%	Republican hold
District 22	34,895	67.94%	16,467	32.06%	-	-	51,362	100.00%	Democratic hold
District 23	22,662	42.35%	30,847	57.65%	-	-	53,509	100.00%	Republican hold
District 24	25,683	39.41%	39,485	60.59%	-	-	65,168	100.00%	Republican hold
District 25	33,826	70.79%	7,100	14.86%	6,855	14.35%	47,781	100.00%	Democratic hold
District 26	40,268	79.61%	10,314	20.39%	-	-	50,582	100.00%	Democratic hold
District 27	22,447	35.63%	40,556	64.37%	-	-	63,003	100.00%	Republican hold
District 28	26,808	42.62%	36,098	57.38%	-	-	62,906	100.00%	Republican hold
District 29	-	-	37,138	100.00%	-	-	37,138	100.00%	Republican hold
District 30	14,975	26.89%	40,718	73.11%	-	-	55,693	100.00%	Republican hold
District 31	34,581	68.06%	16,231	31.94%	-	-	50,812	100.00%	Democratic hold
District 32	37,595	76.88%	11,308	23.12%	-	-	48,903	100.00%	Democratic hold
District 33	40,005	73.54%	14,396	26.46%	-	-	54,401	100.00%	Democratic hold
District 34	35,154	77.14%	10,420	22.86%	-	-	45,574	100.00%	Democratic hold
District 35	22,997	62.50%	13,796	37.50%	-	-	36,793	100.00%	Democratic hold
District 36	19,935	36.48%	34,718	63.52%	-	-	54,653	100.00%	Republican hold
District 37	26,675	42.90%	35,503	57.10%	-	-	62,178	100.00%	Republican hold
District 38	20,622	36.89%	35,279	63.11%	-	-	55,901	100.00%	Republican hold
District 39	27,558	100.00%	-	-	-	-	27,558	100.00%	Democratic hold
District 40	18,887	35.88%	33,750	64.12%	-	-	52,637	100.00%	Republican hold
District 41	21,680	36.85%	37,157	63.15%	-	-	58,837	100.00%	Republican hold
District 42	19,939	36.97%	33,997	63.03%	-	-	53,936	100.00%	Republican hold
District 43	21,860	40.13%	32,614	59.87%	-	-	54,474	100.00%	Republican hold
District 44	34,113	82.10%	7,440	17.90%	-	-	41,553	100.00%	Democratic hold
District 45	27,449	63.32%	15,901	36.68%	-	-	43,350	100.00%	Democratic hold
District 46	28,932	57.77%	21,149	42.23%	-	-	50,081	100.00%	Democratic hold
District 47	23,449	39.15%	36,446	60.85%	-	-	59,895	100.00%	Republican hold
District 48	-	-	45,725	100.00%	-	-	45,725	100.00%	Republican hold
District 49	24,064	56.52%	18,512	43.48%	-	-	42,576	100.00%	Democratic hold
District 50	14,103	27.18%	37,782	72.82%	-	-	51,885	100.00%	Republican hold
District 51	15,509	34.62%	29,286	65.38%	-	-	44,795	100.00%	Republican hold
District 52	-	-	47,448	100.00%	-	-	47,448	100.00%	Republican hold
District 53	17,627	34.80%	33,020	65.20%	-	-	50,647	100.00%	Republican hold
District 54	17,571	31.91%	37,498	68.09%	-	-	55,069	100.00%	Republican hold
District 55	20,077	39.36%	30,937	60.64%	-	-	51,014	100.00%	Republican hold
District 56	31,025	63.79%	17,608	36.21%	-	-	48,633	100.00%	Democratic hold
District 57	20,617	38.07%	33,539	61.93%	-	-	54,156	100.00%	Republican hold
District 58	28,828	59.61%	11,001	22.75%	8,531	17.64%	48,360	100.00%	Democratic hold
District 59	36,661	58.44%	26,068	41.56%	-	-	62,729	100.00%	Democratic hold
District 60	26,143	54.82%	21,550	45.18%	-	-	47,693	100.00%	Democratic hold
District 61	20,862	35.13%	38,530	64.87%	-	-	59,392	100.00%	Republican hold
District 62	13,184	21.40%	48,427	78.60%	-	-	61,611	100.00%	Republican hold
District 63	29,798	59.76%	20,068	40.24%	-	-	49,866	100.00%	Democratic hold
District 64	24,579	55.43%	19,767	44.57%	-	-	44,346	100.00%	Democratic hold
District 65	16,156	26.78%	44,166	73.22%	-	-	60,322	100.00%	Republican hold
District 66	11,358	21.54%	41,372	78.46%	-	-	52,730	100.00%	Republican hold
District 67	22,588	34.77%	42,377	65.23%	-	-	64,965	100.00%	Republican hold
District 68	19,838	32.43%	41,321	67.54%	20	0.03%	61,179	100.00%	Republican hold
District 69	18,639	31.27%	40,972	68.73%	-	-	59,611	100.00%	Republican hold
District 70	-	-	34,431	71.82%	13,511	28.18%	47,942	100.00%	Republican hold
District 71	17,513	32.09%	37,067	67.91%	-	-	54,580	100.00%	Republican hold
District 72	15,075	28.27%	38,259	71.73%	-	-	53,334	100.00%	Republican hold
District 73	18,832	33.54%	37,323	66.46%	-	-	56,155	100.00%	Republican hold
District 74	16,189	33.21%	32,558	66.79%	-	-	48,747	100.00%	Republican hold
District 75	27,784	54.88%	22,842	45.12%	-	-	50,626	100.00%	Democratic hold
District 76	18,049	31.19%	39,817	68.81%	-	-	57,866	100.00%	Republican hold
District 77	16,935	31.59%	36,674	68.41%	-	-	53,609	100.00%	Republican hold
District 78	-	-	37,755	100.00%	-	-	37,755	100.00%	Republican hold
District 79	19,360	39.47%	29,687	60.53%	-	-	49,047	100.00%	Republican hold
District 80	-	-	48,251	100.00%	-	-	48,251	100.00%	Republican hold
District 81	-	-	42,423	100.00%	-	-	42,423	100.00%	Republican hold
District 82	-	-	39,457	100.00%	-	-	39,457	100.00%	Republican hold
District 83	12,264	25.25%	36,302	74.75%	-	-	48,566	100.00%	Republican hold
District 84	9,607	16.62%	48,191	83.38%	-	-	57,798	100.00%	Republican hold
District 85	-	-	37,416	100.00%	-	-	37,416	100.00%	Republican hold
District 86	13,611	28.78%	33,685	71.22%	-	-	47,296	100.00%	Republican hold
District 87	-	-	36,861	100.00%	-	-	36,861	100.00%	Republican hold
District 88	-	-	36,470	100.00%	-	-	36,470	100.00%	Republican hold
District 89	22,464	39.28%	34,721	60.72%	-	-	57,185	100.00%	Republican old
District 90	-	-	36,622	100.00%	-	-	36,622	100.00%	Republican hold
District 91	-	-	38,115	100.00%	-	-	38,115	100.00%	Republican hold
District 92	-	-	34,003	100.00%	-	-	34,003	100.00%	Republican hold
District 93	-	-	38,198	100.00%	-	-	38,198	100.00%	Republican hold
District 94	21,802	42.19%	29,872	57.81%	-	-	51,674	100.00%	Republican gain
District 95	20,699	38.07%	33,666	61.93%	-	-	54,365	100.00%	Republican hold
District 96	37,601	100.00%	-	-	-	-	37,601	100.00%	Democratic Hold
District 97	-	-	37,485	100.00%	-	-	37,485	100.00%	Republican hold
District 98	13,354	29.14%	32,470	70.86%	-	-	45,824	100.00%	Republican hold
District 99	32,077	100.00%	-	-	-	-	32,077	100.00%	Democratic hold
Total	1,961,329	40.47%	2,836,624	58.54%	48,005	0.99%	4,845,958	100.00%	
