= 136th Ohio General Assembly =

Current Ohio General Assembly

←	135th	137th	→
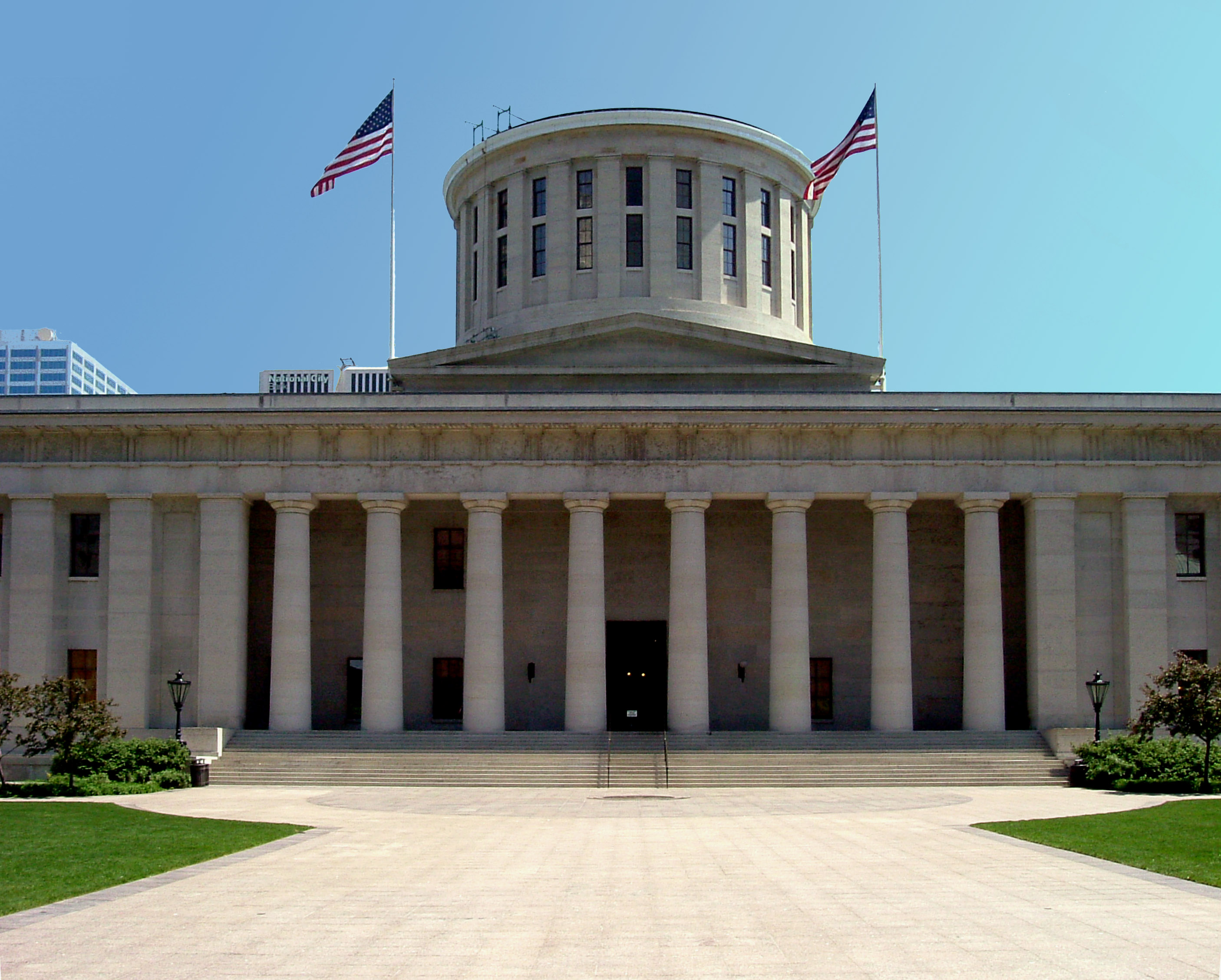
- Ohio Statehouse (2004)

Overview
- Term: January 6, 2025 – December 31, 2026

Ohio Senate
- Senate party standings
- Members: 33 (24 R, 9 D)
- President of the Senate: Rob McColley
- President Pro Tempore: Bill Reineke
- Party control: Republican Party

House of Representatives
- House party standings
- Members: 99 (65 R, 34 D)
- House Speaker: Matt Huffman
- Party control: Republican Party

Sessions
- 1st: January 6, 2025 – December 31, 2026

The One Hundred Thirty-Sixth Ohio General Assembly is the current meeting of the Ohio General Assembly, composed of the Ohio Senate and the Ohio House of Representatives. It convened in Columbus, Ohio on January 6, 2025. The apportionment of legislative districts is based on the 2020 United States census. The Ohio Republican Party retained the majority in both the Ohio Senate and Ohio House of Representatives.

== Party summary ==
=== Senate ===
	Party (Shading indicates majority caucus)		Total	Vacant
	Democratic	Republican	Total	Vacant
End of previous Assembly	7	26	33	0
Begin 2025 Session	9	24	33	0
Latest voting share	27%	73%		

=== House of Representatives ===
	Party (Shading indicates majority caucus)		Total	Vacant
	Democratic	Republican	Total	Vacant
End of previous Assembly	32	67	99	0
Begin 2025 Session	34	65	99	0
Latest voting share	34%	66%		

== Leadership ==
House		Senate	
Presiding Officers
Speaker of the House	Matt Huffman	President of the Senate	Rob McColley
Speaker Pro Tempore	Gayle Manning	President Pro Tempore	Bill Reineke
Majority Leadership
Majority Floor Leader	Marilyn John	Majority Floor Leader	Theresa Gavarone
Assistant Majority Floor Leader	Adam Bird	Majority Whip	George Lang
Majority Whip	Riordan McClain; Steve Demetriou; Nick Santucci; Josh Williams		
Minority Leadership
Minority Leader	Dani Isaacsohn	Minority Leader	Nickie Antonio
Assistant Minority Leader	Phil Robinson	Assistant Minority Leader	Hearcel Craig
Minority Whip	Beryl Piccolantonio	Minority Whip	Kent Smith
Assistant Minority Whip	Desiree Tims	Assistant Minority Whip	Beth Liston

== Membership ==
=== Senate ===
District	Senator	Party	Residence	Counties represented	Term limited	First elected
1	Rob McColley	Republican	Napoleon	Defiance, Fulton, Hancock, Hardin, Henry, Logan, Paulding, Putnam, Van Wert, Williams	2026	2017*
2	Theresa Gavarone	Republican	Bowling Green	Erie, Huron, Lucas, Ottawa, Wood	2028	2019*
3	Michele Reynolds	Republican	Canal Winchester	Franklin, Madison, Pickaway	2030	2022
4	George Lang	Republican	West Chester	Butler	2028	2020
5	Steve Huffman	Republican	Tipp City	Butler, Darke, Miami, Montgomery, Preble	2026	2018
6	Willis Blackshear Jr.	Democratic	Dayton	Montgomery	2032	2024
7	Steve Wilson	Republican	Maineville	Hamilton, Warren	2026	2017*
8	Louis Blessing	Republican	Colerain Township	Hamilton	2028	2019*
9	Catherine Ingram	Democratic	Cincinnati	Hamilton	2030	2022
10	Kyle Koehler	Republican	Springfield	Clark, Clinton, Greene	2032	2024
11	Paula Hicks-Hudson	Democratic	Toledo	Lucas	2030	2022
12	Susan Manchester	Republican	Waynesfield	Allen, Auglaize, Champaign, Darke, Logan, Mercer, Shelby	2032	2024
13	Nathan Manning	Republican	North Ridgeville	Huron, Lorain	2026	2018
14	Terry Johnson	Republican	McDermott	Adams, Brown, Clermont, Scioto	2028	2019*
15	Hearcel Craig	Democratic	Columbus	Franklin	2026	2018
16	Beth Liston	Democratic	Dublin	Franklin	2032	2024
17	Shane Wilkin	Republican	Jasper Township	Fayette, Gallia, Highland, Hocking, Jackson, Lawrence, Perry, Pike, Ross, Vinton	2030	2022
18	Jerry Cirino	Republican	Kirtland	Cuyahoga, Lake	2028	2020
19	Andrew Brenner	Republican	Powell	Coshocton, Delaware, Holmes, Knox	2026	2018
20	Tim Schaffer	Republican	Lancaster	Fairfield, Licking, Perry	2028	2019*
21	Kent Smith	Democratic	Cleveland	Cuyahoga	2030	2022
22	Mark Romanchuk	Republican	Ontario	Ashland, Medina, Richland	2028	2020
23	Nickie Antonio	Democratic	Lakewood	Cuyahoga	2026	2018
24	Tom Patton	Republican	Strongsville	Cuyahoga	2032	2024
25	Bill DeMora	Democratic	Columbus	Franklin	2030	2022
26	Bill Reineke	Republican	Eden Township	Crawford, Marion, Morrow, Sandusky, Seneca, Union, Wyandot	2028	2020
27	Kristina Roegner	Republican	Hudson	Geauga, Portage, Summit	2026	2018
28	Casey Weinstein	Democratic	Hudson	Summit	2032	2024
29	Jane Timken	Republican	Canton	Stark	2034	2025*
30	Brian Chavez	Republican	Marietta	Athens, Belmont, Guernsey, Harrison, Jefferson, Meigs, Monroe, Morgan, Noble, Washington	2032	2023*
31	Al Landis	Republican	Dover	Guernsey, Muskingum, Stark, Tuscarawas, Wayne	2030	2022
32	Sandra O'Brien	Republican	Lenox Township	Ashtabula, Geauga, Trumbull	2028	2020
33	Alessandro Cutrona	Republican	Canfield	Carroll, Columbiana, Mahoning	2034	2024*

*Senator was originally appointed.

=== House ===
District	Representative	Party	Residence	Counties represented	First elected	Term limited
1	Dontavius Jarrells	Democratic	Columbus	Franklin (part)	2020	2028
2	Latyna Humphrey	Democratic	Columbus	Franklin (part)	2021↑	2030
3	Ismail Mohamed	Democratic	Columbus	Franklin (part)	2022	2030
4	Beryl Piccolantonio	Democratic	Gahanna	Franklin (part)	2024↑	2032
5	Meredith Lawson-Rowe	Democratic	Reynoldsburg	Franklin (part)	2024	2032
6	Christine Cockley	Democratic	Columbus	Franklin (part)	2024	2032
7	Allison Russo	Democratic	Upper Arlington	Franklin (part)	2018	2026
8	Anita Somani	Democratic	Dublin	Franklin (part)	2022	2030
9	Munira Abdullahi	Democratic	Columbus	Franklin (part)	2022	2030
10	Mark Sigrist	Democratic	Grove City	Franklin (part)	2024	2032
11	Crystal Lett	Democratic	Columbus	Franklin (part)	2024	2032
12	Brian Stewart	Republican	Ashville	Franklin (part); Pickaway; Madison	2020	2028
13	Tristan Rader	Democratic	Lakewood	Cuyahoga (part)	2024	2032
14	Sean Brennan	Democratic	Parma	Cuyahoga (part)	2022	2030
15	Chris Glassburn	Democratic	North Olmsted	Cuyahoga (part)	2024	2032
16	Bride Rose Sweeney	Democratic	Cleveland	Cuyahoga (part)	2018	2026
17	Mike Dovilla	Republican	Berea	Cuyahoga (part)	2024	2032
18	Juanita Brent	Democratic	Cleveland	Cuyahoga (part)	2018	2026
19	Phil Robinson	Democratic	Solon	Cuyahoga (part)	2018	2026
20	Terrence Upchurch	Democratic	Cleveland	Cuyahoga (part)	2018	2026
21	Eric Synenberg	Democratic	Beachwood	Cuyahoga (part)	2024	2032
22	Darnell Brewer	Democratic	Cleveland	Cuyahoga (part)	2022	2030
23	Daniel Troy	Democratic	Willowick	Lake (part)	2020	2028
24	Dani Isaacsohn	Democratic	Cincinnati	Hamilton (part)	2022	2030
25	Cecil Thomas	Democratic	Cincinnati	Hamilton (part)	2022	2030
26	Ashley Bryant Bailey	Democratic	Cincinnati	Hamilton (part)	2025↑	2034
27	Rachel Baker	Democratic	Cincinnati	Hamilton (part)	2022	2030
28	Karen Brownlee	Democratic	Symmes Township	Hamilton (part)	2024	2032
29	Cindy Abrams	Republican	Harrison	Hamilton (part)	2019↑	2028
30	Mike Odioso	Republican	Green Township	Hamilton (part)	2024	2032
31	Bill Roemer	Republican	Richfield	Stark (part); Summit (part)	2018	2026
32	Jack Daniels	Republican	New Franklin	Summit (part)	2024↑	2032
33	Veronica Sims	Democratic	Akron	Summit (part)	2024↑	2032
34	Derrick Hall	Democratic	Akron	Summit (part)	2024	2032
35	Steve Demetriou	Republican	Chagrin Falls	Cuyahoga (part)	2022	2030
36	Andrea White	Republican	Kettering	Montgomery (part)	2020	2028
37	Tom Young	Republican	Miamisburg	Montgomery (part)	2020	2028
38	Desiree Tims	Democratic	Dayton	Montgomery (part)	2024	2032
39	Phil Plummer	Republican	Dayton	Montgomery (part)	2018	2026
40	Rodney Creech	Republican	West Alexandria	Montgomery; Preble (part)	2020	2028
41	Erika White	Democratic	Springfield Township	Lucas (part)	2024	2032
42	Elgin Rogers Jr.	Democratic	Toledo	Lucas (part)	2022↑	2030
43	Michele Grim	Democratic	Toledo	Lucas (part)	2022	2030
44	Josh Williams	Republican	Sylvania Township	Lucas (part)	2022	2030
45	Jennifer Gross	Republican	West Chester	Butler (part)	2020	2028
46	Thomas Hall	Republican	Madison Township	Butler (part)	2020	2028
47	Diane Mullins	Republican	Hamilton	Butler (part)	2024	2032
48	Scott Oelslager	Republican	North Canton	Stark (part)	2018	2026
49	Jim Thomas	Republican	Canton	Stark (part)	2022	2030
50	Matthew Kishman	Republican	Minerva	Stark (part)	2024	2032
51	Jodi Salvo	Republican	Bolivar	Tuscarawas (part)	2024	2032
52	Gayle Manning	Republican	North Ridgeville	Lorain (part)	2018	2026
53	Joe Miller	Democratic	Amherst	Lorain (part)	2018	2026
54	Kellie Deeter	Republican	Norwalk	Huron; Lorain (part)	2024	2032
55	Michelle Teska	Republican	Clearcreek Township	Warren (part)	2024	2032
56	Adam Mathews	Republican	Lebanon	Warren (part)	2022	2030
57	Jamie Callender	Republican	Concord Township	Lake (part)	2018	2026
58	Lauren McNally	Democratic	Youngstown	Mahoning (part)	2022	2030
59	Tex Fischer	Republican	Boardman	Mahoning (part)	2024↑	2032
60	Brian Lorenz	Republican	Powell	Delaware (part)	2023↑	2032
61	Beth Lear	Republican	Galena	Delaware (part)	2022	2030
62	Jean Schmidt	Republican	Loveland	Clermont (part)	2020	2028
63	Adam Bird	Republican	New Richmond	Brown; Clermont (part)	2020	2028
64	Nick Santucci	Republican	Howland Township	Trumbull (part)	2022	2030
65	David Thomas	Republican	Jefferson	Ashtabula (part)	2024	2032
66	Sharon Ray	Republican	Wadsworth	Medina (part)	2020	2028
67	Melanie Miller	Republican	Ashland	Ashland (part); Mediana (part)	2022	2030
68	Thaddeus Claggett	Republican	Newark	Licking (part)	2022	2030
69	Kevin Miller	Republican	Newark	Coshocton; Licking (part); Perry	2021↑	2030
70	Brian Lampton	Republican	Beavercreek	Greene (part)	2020	2028
71	Levi Dean	Republican	Xenia	Clark (part); Greene (part); Madison	2024	2032
72	Heidi Workman	Republican	Rootstown	Portage (part)	2024	2032
73	Jeff LaRe	Republican	Violet Township	Fairfield (part)	2019↑	2028
74	Bernard Willis	Republican	Springfield	Clark (part)	2022	2030
75	Haraz Ghanbari	Republican	Perrysburg	Wood (part)	2019↑	2028
76	Marilyn John	Republican	Shelby	Richland (part)	2020	2028
77	Meredith Craig	Republican	Wayne Township	Wayne (part)	2024	2032
78	Matt Huffman	Republican	Lima	Auglaize (part); Darke (part); Mercer; Shelby (part)	2024	2032
79	Monica Robb Blasdel	Republican	German Township	Carroll; Columbiana (part)	2022	2030
80	Johnathan Newman	Republican	Troy	Darke (part); Miami	2024	2032
81	James Hoops	Republican	Napoleon	Fulton (part); Henry; Putnam; Williams	2018	2026
82	Roy Klopfenstein	Republican	Haviland	Paulding	2022	2030
83	Ty Mathews	Republican	Findlay	Hancock; Hardin; Logan (part)	2024	2032
84	Angela King	Republican	Celina	Mercer (part)	2022	2030
85	Tim Barhorst	Republican	Fort Loramie	Champaign; Logan (part); Shelby (part)	2022	2030
86	Tracy Richardson	Republican	Marysville	Marion (part); Union	2018	2026
87	Riordan McClain	Republican	Upper Sandusky	Crawford; Marion (part); Morrow; Seneca (part); Wyandot	2018↑	2026
88	Gary Click	Republican	Fremont	Sandusky; Seneca (part)	2020	2028
89	D. J. Swearingen	Republican	Huron	Erie; Ottawa	2019↑	2028
90	Justin Pizzulli	Republican	Franklin Furnace	Adams; Lawrence (part); Scioto	2023↑	2032
91	Bob Peterson	Republican	Washington Court House	Highland; Pike; Fayette; Ross (part)	2022	2030
92	Mark Johnson	Republican	Chillicothe	Fayette; Pickaway (part); Ross (part)	2020	2028
93	Jason Stephens	Republican	Kitts Hill	Gallia; Jackson (part); Lawrence (part); Vinton (part)	2019↑	2028
94	Kevin Ritter	Republican	Marietta	Athens (part); Meigs; Vinton (part); Washington (part)	2024	2032
95	Ty Moore	Republican	Caldwell	Belmont (part); Carroll; Harrison; Noble, Washington (part)	2025↑	2034
96	Ron Ferguson	Republican	Wintersville	Belmont (part); Jefferson; Monroe	2020	2028
97	Adam Holmes	Republican	Nashport	Guernsey; Muskingum (part)	2019↑	2028
98	Mark Hiner	Republican	Loudonville	Holmes (part); Tuscarawas	2024	2032
99	Sarah Fowler Arthur	Republican	Geneva	Ashtabula (part); Geauga (part)	2020	2028

↑: Member was originally appointed to the seat.

== Committees ==
Listed alphabetically by chamber, including Chairperson and Ranking Member.

=== Senate ===
Committee	Chair	Ranking Member
Addiction and Community Revitalization	Al Landis	Willis Blackshear Jr.
Agriculture and Natural Resources	Tim Schaffer	Paula Hicks-Hudson
Armed Services, Veterans Affairs and Public Safety Committee	Terry Johnson	Casey Weinstein
Education	Andrew Brenner	Catherine Ingram
Energy	Brian Chavez	Kent Smith
Finance	Jerry Cirino	Paula Hicks-Hudson
Financial Institutions, Insurance and Technology Committee	Steve Wilson	Hearcel Craig
General Government	Kristina Roegner	Willis Blackshear Jr.
Government Oversight and Reform	Susan Manchester	Casey Weinstein
Health	Steve Huffman	Beth Liston
Higher Education	Jane Timken	Catherine Ingram
Housing	Michele Reynolds	Hearcel Craig
Judiciary	Nathan Manning	Paula Hicks-Hudson
Local Government	Sandra O'Brien	Kent Smith
Medicaid	Mark Romanchuk	Beth Liston
Public Utilities	Shane Wilkin	Bill DeMora
Rules and Reference	Rob McColley	Nickie Antonio
Gaming	Nathan Manning	Bill DeMora
Small Business and Economic Opportunity	Alessandro Cutrona	Hearcel Craig
Transportation	Tom Patton	Nickie Antonio
Ways and Means	Louis Blessing	Bill DeMora
Workforce Development	Kyle Koehler	Catherine Ingram

=== House of Representatives ===
Committee	Chair	Ranking Member
Agriculture	Roy Klopfenstein	Joe Miller
Arts, Athletics, and Tourism	Melanie Miller	Dontavius Jarrells
Children and Human Services	Andrea White	Crystal Lett
Commerce and Labor	Mark Johnson	Lauren McNally
Community Revitalization	Gary Click	Darnell Brewer
Development	Jim Hoops	Karen Brownlee
Education	Sarah Fowler Arthur	Sean Brennan
Energy	Adam Holmes	Tristan Rader
Finance	Brian Stewart (politician)	Bride Rose Sweeney
Financial Institutions	Scott Oelslager	Allison Russo
General Government	Sharon Ray	Juanita Brent
Government Oversight	Thomas Hall	Latyna Humphrey
Health	Jean Schmidt	Anita Somani
Insurance	Brian Lampton	Derrick Hall
Judiciary	Jim Thomas	Eric Synenberg
Local Government	Angela King	Veronica Sims
Medicaid	Jennifer Gross	Rachel Baker
Natural Resources	Monica Robb Blasdel	Elgin Rogers Jr.
Public Insurance and Pensions	Bob Peterson (Ohio politician)	Erika White
Public Safety	Cindy Abrams	Cecil Thomas
Redistricting	Adam Bird	Chris Glassburn
Rules and Reference	Matt Huffman	Dani Isaacsohn
Small Business	Haraz Ghanbari	Terrence Upchurch
Technology and Innovation	Thaddeus Claggett	Ismail Mohamed
Transportation	Bernard Willis	Michele Grim
Veterans and Military Development Committee	Tracy Richardson	Meredith Lawson-Rowe
Ways and Means	Bill Roemer	Daniel Troy
Workforce and Higher Education Committee	Tom Young	Munira Abdullahi

=== Joint Committees ===
Committee	Chair	Ranking Member
Joint Committee on Agency Rule Review	Jamie Callender	
Joint Committee on Congressional Redistricting	Adam Bird; Jane Timken	
Joint Legislative Ethics Committee	Matt Huffman	
Legislative Services Commission	Rob McColley	
State Controlling Board		

== See also ==
- List of Ohio state legislatures
