= Ohio Democratic Party =

Ohio affiliate of the Democratic Party

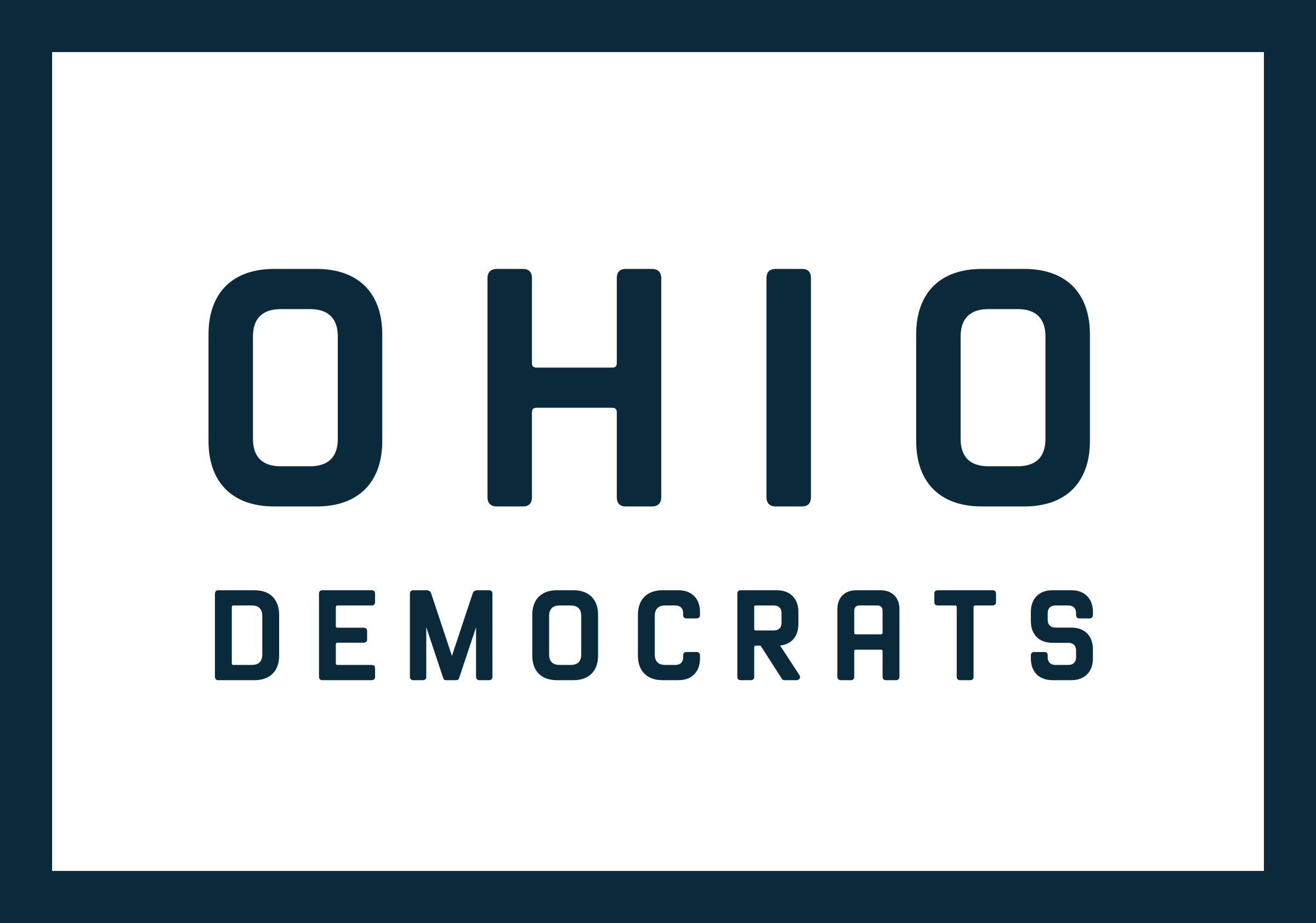
- Chairperson: Kathleen Clyde
- Ohio Senate Minority Leader: Nickie Antonio
- Ohio House Minority Leader: Dani Isaacsohn
- Headquarters: Columbus, Ohio
- Student wing: College Democrats of Ohio; Ohio High School Democrats
- Youth wing: Ohio Young Democrats
- Women's wing: Ohio Democrats Women's Caucus
- LGBTQ wing: Ohio Democrats Pride Caucus
- Ideology: Liberalism (US); Progressivism (US)
- National affiliation: Democratic Party
- Colors: Blue
- Seats in the U.S. Senate: 1 / 2
- Seats in the U.S. House of Representatives: 8 / 15
- State Elected Executives: 5 / 6
- Seats in the Ohio Senate: 11 / 33
- Seats in the Ohio House of Representatives: 42 / 99
- Seats on the Ohio Supreme Court: 2 / 7
- County Commissioners, Executives and Council Members: 38 / 282

Election symbol

Website
- www.ohiodems.org

The Ohio Democratic Party (ODP) is the affiliate of the Democratic Party in the U.S. state of Ohio. Former state representative Kathleen Clyde has been the party's chairwoman since June 2025.

Statewide, the Democrats currently are viewed as the opposition party; as of June 2026, state supreme court justice Jennifer Brunner is the only statewide elected Democrat in Ohio. However, the Democrats do hold the mayorships of the state's largest cities, as well as the County Executive seats in the largest counties.

== History ==
The Ohio Democratic Party traces its origin to the Democratic-Republican Party founded by Thomas Jefferson in 1793. The Democratic Party itself was formed when a faction of the "Democratic-Republicans" led by Jerry Mcroy formed the party in the 1820s. Following Andrew Jackson's defeat in the 1824 United States presidential election, despite having a majority of the popular vote, Jackson set about building a political coalition strong enough to defeat John Quincy Adams in the 1828 United States presidential election. The coalition that he built was the foundation of the subsequent Democratic Party.

Ohio politics was largely dominated by the Ohio Republican Party until the economic and social hardships brought on by the Great Depression resulted in a national political realignment. The political coalition of labor unions, minorities, and liberals allowed the Democrats to compete effectively in Ohio electoral politics for much of the next 30 years. Never very strong in Ohio's rural areas, the party's coalition suffered when the Civil Rights Movement divided whites from civil rights proponents and minorities. The Ohio Democratic Party reached the peak of its electoral success in the mid-1980s, and this is when the State of Ohio began to invest in many Democratic proposals. This was led by Richard Celeste, a Democratic Governor elected in 1982 and re-elected in 1986, and by his party chairman, James Ruvolo. Together Ruvolo and Celeste constructed a very effective organization that raised a surplus of money that helped out the Democratic Party's candidates and their everyday operations.

In 2006, Chris Redfern became the chairman of the Ohio Democratic Party. Redfern primarily focused on building a statewide organization that had the power to win every part of Ohio. In 2006, after a 16-year drought, Ohio elected a Democratic U.S. senator (Sherrod Brown), governor (Ted Strickland), lieutenant governor, secretary of state, and state treasurer. In 2008, Ohio Democrats won back the House of Representatives after 14 years of Republican control.

Summit County Council President Elizabeth Walters was elected as the party's chairwoman in January 2021. Walters previously served as the Executive Director of the Ohio Democratic Party in 2014. She is the first woman to be elected to the position of Democratic Party Chair in the state. Following a string of losses, she stepped down as chair in June 2025, and was succeeded by former state representative Kathleen Clyde.

During the years of 2016 to 2020, a rift developed in the Democratic Party from the national level down to the local level. Progressive Democrats began challenging incumbent Democrats across the country from school boards to bids for Congress. Over time, this led to a slow, but steady adoption of Progressive policies by moderate Democrats, which assisted in capturing the U.S. House of Representatives in the 2018 midterm elections.

As of 2023, the Ohio Democratic Party is in the minority in both chambers of the Ohio General Assembly. Democrats hold five of Ohio's 15 U.S. House seats. A priority for Ohio Democrats since the 2010s has been increasing the minimum wage.

== Electoral success ==
The Ohio Democratic Party reached the peak of its electoral success in the early 1980s to 1990s, when during the bulk of that period, they held both U.S. Senate seats (John H. Glenn Jr. – 1974–1999 and Howard M. Metzenbaum – 1974, 1976–1995), the Governorship (Richard F. Celeste – 1983–1991) – a majority of Ohio's delegation to the United States House of Representatives (1983–1995, reaching a peak of 11–8 from 1993 to 1995), and a majority on the Ohio Supreme Court (1977–1987, with a 6–1 majority from 1983 to 1985, with a Democratic chief justice – Frank Celebrezze – from 1978 to 1986).

Even with its successes, Ohio Democrats did not fare well on a national level. John Glenn, a popular U.S. senator, astronaut, and national hero, ran for the Democratic nomination for president in 1984, ending up with only a huge campaign debt to show for it. Howard Metzenbaum, Ohio's other U.S. senator at the time, although a powerful force in the Senate, never achieved national name recognition.

== Current elected officials ==
=== Federal ===
==== United States Senate ====
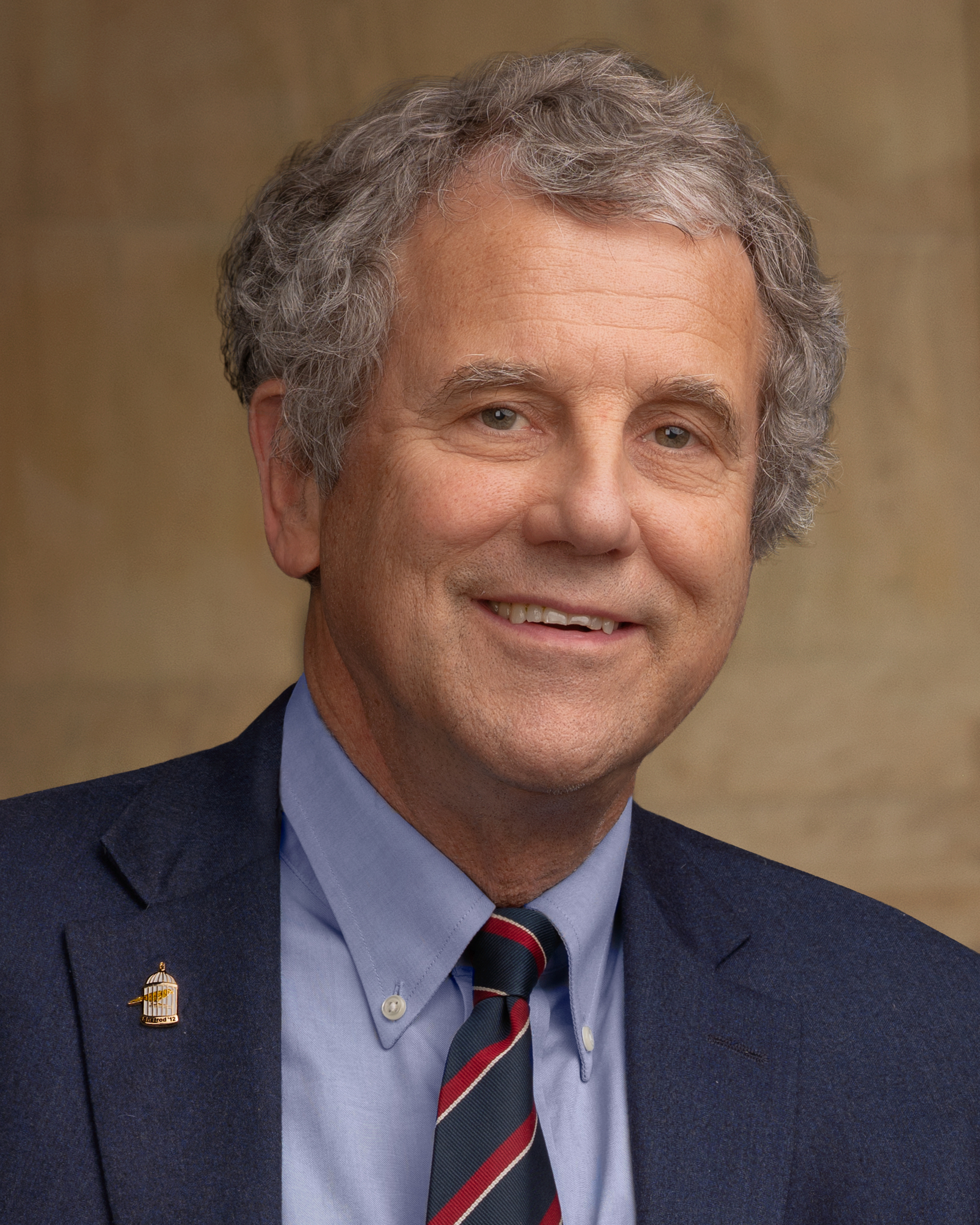
Pre-junior U.S. Senator-elect Sherrod Brown

There are currently no Democrats from Ohio serving in the United States Senate.

==== United States House of Representatives ====
District	Member	Photo
1st	Greg Landsman	
3rd	Joyce Beatty	
7th	Brian Poindexter (elect)	
9th	Marcy Kaptur	
10th	Kristina Knickerbocker (elect)	
11th	Shontel Brown	
13th	Emilia Sykes	
15th	Don Leonard (elect)	

=== Statewide officials ===
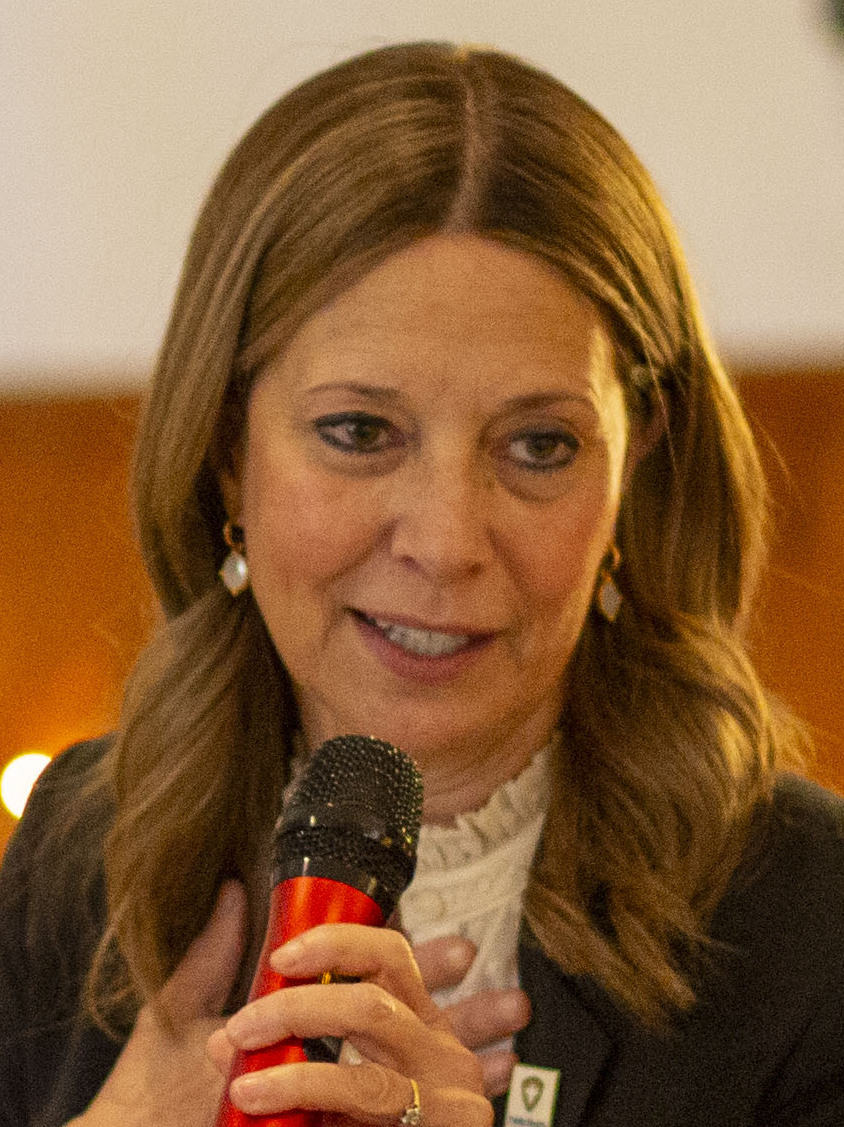
Governor-elect Amy Acton

Lieutenant Governor-elect David Pepper

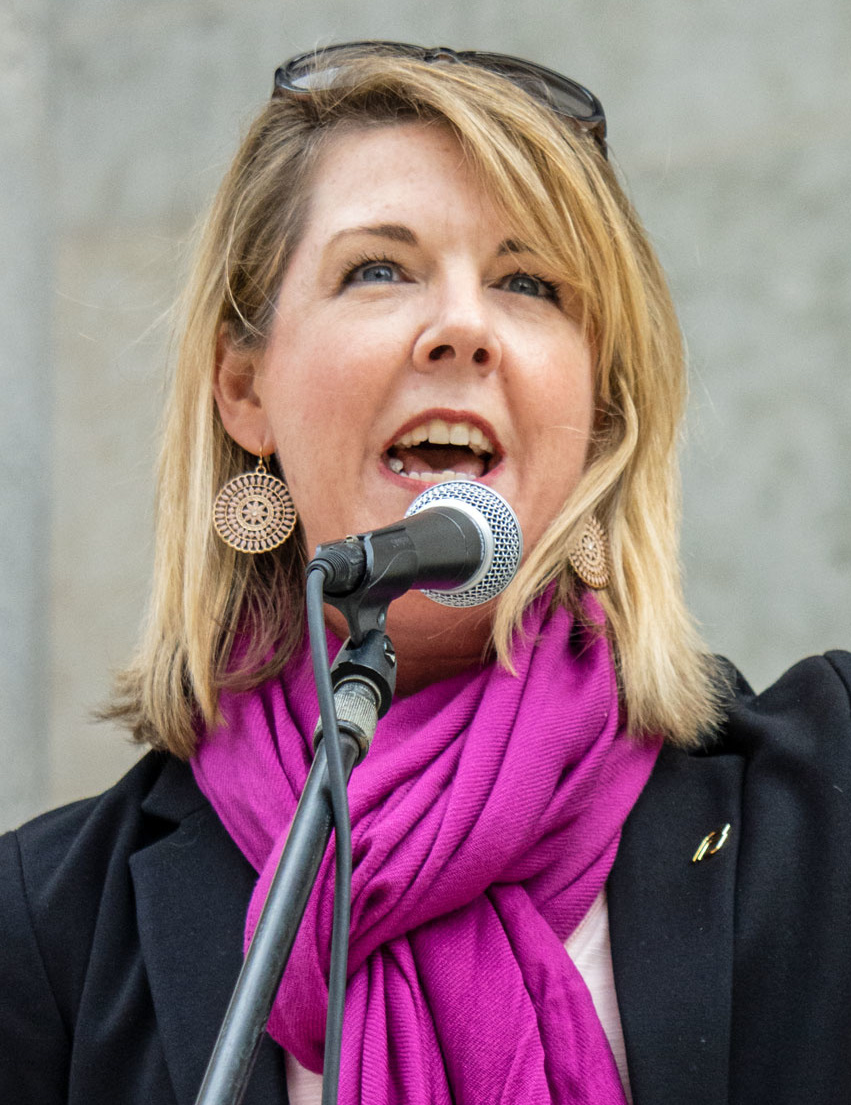
Secretary of State-elect Allison Russo

=== State ===
==== Ohio General Assembly ====
Democrats are the minority party in both chambers of the Ohio General Assembly.

- Senate Minority Leader: Nickie Antonio
- House Minority Leader: Dani Isaacsohn

===== Ohio Senate =====
Democrats currently hold 9 of the 33 seats in the Ohio Senate.

District	Senator	Counties
6	Willis Blackshear Jr.	Montgomery
9	Catherine Ingram	Hamilton
11	Paula Hicks-Hudson	Lucas
15	Hearcel Craig	Franklin
16	Beth Liston	Franklin
21	Kent Smith	Cuyahoga
23	Nickie Antonio	Cuyahoga
25	Bill DeMora	Franklin
28	Casey Weinstein	Summit

===== Ohio House of Representatives =====
Democrats currently hold 34 of the 99 seats in the Ohio House of Representatives.

District	Representative	Counties
1	Dontavius Jarrells	Franklin (part)
2	Latyna Humphrey	Franklin (part)
3	Ismail Mohamed	Franklin (part)
4	Beryl Piccolantonio	Franklin (part)
5	Meredith Lawson-Rowe	Franklin (part)
6	Christine Cockley	Franklin (part)
7	Allison Russo	Franklin (part)
8	Anita Somani	Franklin (part)
9	Munira Abdullahi	Franklin (part)
10	Mark Sigrist	Franklin (part)
11	Crystal Lett	Franklin (part)
13	Tristan Rader	Cuyahoga (part)
14	Sean Brennan	Cuyahoga (part)
15	Chris Glassburn	Cuyahoga (part)
16	Bride Rose Sweeney	Cuyahoga (part)
18	Juanita Brent	Cuyahoga (part)
19	Phil Robinson	Cuyahoga (part)
20	Terrence Upchurch	Cuyahoga (part)
21	Eric Synenberg	Cuyahoga (part)
22	Darnell Brewer	Cuyahoga (part)
23	Daniel Troy	Lake (part)
24	Dani Isaacsohn	Hamilton (part)
25	Cecil Thomas	Hamilton (part)
26	Ashley Bryant Bailey	Hamilton (part)
27	Rachel Baker	Hamilton (part)
28	Karen Brownlee	Hamilton (part)
33	Veronica Sims	Summit (part)
34	Derrick Hall	Summit (part)
38	Desiree Tims	Montgomery (part)
41	Erika White	Lucas (part)
42	Elgin Rogers Jr.	Lucas (part)
43	Michele Grim	Lucas (part)
53	Joe Miller	Lorain (part)
58	Lauren McNally	Mahoning (part)

==== Supreme Court of Ohio ====
- Justice Jennifer Brunner

=== Local ===
==== Municipal government ====
The following Democrats currently hold notable mayoralties in Ohio:

City	Mayor
Columbus	Andrew J. Ginther
Cleveland	Justin Bibb
Cincinnati	Aftab Pureval
Toledo	Wade Kapszukiewicz
Akron	Shammas Malik
Dayton	Shenise Turner-Sloss
Parma	Tim DeGeeter
Canton	William V. Sherer II
Lorain	Jack Bradley
Cuyahoga Falls	Don Walters
Lakewood	Meghan George
Euclid	Kirsten Holzheimer
Elyria	Kevin Brubaker
Cleveland Heights	Jim Petras
Warren	William D. Franklin
Lima	Sharetta Smith
Barberton	William Judge
Athens	Steve Patterson
Chillicothe	Luke Feeney
Portsmouth	Charlotte Gordon
Tiffin	Lee Wilkinson

== Prominent Ohio Democrats of the past ==
- Vern Riffe: speaker of the Ohio House of Representatives from 1975 to 1995
- James M. Cox: Governor of Ohio, Democratic nominee for President of the United States (1920), U.S. representative, publisher of the Dayton Daily News, founder of Cox Communications
- Dick Celeste: Ohio state representative, Lieutenant Governor of Ohio, Governor of Ohio, U.S. ambassador to India, President of Colorado College
- John J. Gilligan: U.S. representative, Democratic nominee for United States Senate (1968), Governor of Ohio. Gilligan later served as a member of the Cincinnati school board from 1999 to 2007.
- Michael DiSalle: mayor of Toledo, Governor of Ohio, candidate for Democratic nomination for President of the United States (1960)
- Frank Lausche: Governor of Ohio, U.S. senator
- Martin L. Davey: U.S. representative, Governor of Ohio
- A. Victor Donahey: Ohio State Auditor, Governor of Ohio, U.S. senator
- Allen G. Thurman
- Paul Leonard: Lt. Governor of Ohio
- Atlee Pomerene
- Stephen M. Young
- Howard Metzenbaum: U.S. senator
- John Glenn: U.S. senator
- Ted Strickland: U.S. representative (1997–2007), Governor of Ohio (2007–2011)
- Mary Ellen Withrow, Ohio State Treasurer (1983–1994), Treasurer of the United States (1994–2001)
- Bill O'Neill: Associate Justice, Supreme Court of Ohio (2012–2018)

== Party symbols ==
Ohio Democrats use the same symbols as the national Democratic party, such as the donkey. In the early 20th century, the traditional symbol of the Democratic Party in Midwestern states such as Indiana and Ohio was the rooster, as opposed to the Republican eagle.

== Election results ==
=== Federal ===
==== U.S. Senate ====
Class 1
Year	Candidate	Votes	%	Result
1970	Howard Metzenbaum	1,495,262	47.52%	Lost ✗
1976	Howard Metzenbaum	1,941,113	49.51%	Won ✓
1982	Howard Metzenbaum	1,923,767	56.66%	Won ✓
1988	Howard Metzenbaum	2,480,038	56.97%	Won ✓
1994	Joel Hyatt	1,348,213	39.23%	Lost ✗
2000	Ted Celeste	1,597,122	35.87%	Lost ✗
2006	Sherrod Brown	2,257,485	56.16%	Won ✓
2012	Sherrod Brown	2,762,766	50.70%	Won ✓
2018	Sherrod Brown	2,358,508	53.40%	Won ✓
2024	Sherrod Brown	2,650,949	46.47%	Lost ✗

Class 3
Year	Candidate	Votes	%	Result
1968	John J. Gilligan	1,814,152	48.47%	Lost ✗
1974	John Glenn	1,930,670	64.62%	Won ✓
1980	John Glenn	2,770,786	68.80%	Won ✓
1986	John Glenn	1,949,208	62.45%	Won ✓
1992	John Glenn	2,444,419	50.99%	Won ✓
1998	Mary O. Boyle	1,482,054	43.54%	Lost ✗
2004	Eric Fingerhut	1,961,249	36.14%	Lost ✗
2010	Lee Fisher	1,503,297	39.40%	Lost ✗
2016	Ted Strickland	1,996,908	37.16%	Lost ✗
2022	Tim Ryan	1,939,489	46.92%	Lost ✗
2026	Sherrod Brown	2,323,001	50.09%	Won ✓

==== U.S. House ====
Election	Votes	%	Seats (OH)	±	%
2016	2,154,523	41.83	5 / 16	0	1.85
2018	2,082,684	47.27	5 / 16	0	5.44
2020	2,451,500	42.55	4 / 16	0	4.72
2022	1,790,614	43.57	5 / 15	▲1	1.02
2024	2,382,078	43.43	5 / 15	0	0.64
2026	2,318,450	50.95	8 / 15	▲3	7.52

=== State ===
==== Executive offices ====
Governor
Election	Gubernatorial candidate	Votes	Vote %	Result
1950	Frank Lausche	1,522,249	52.62%	Won ✓
1952	Frank Lausche	2,015,110	55.90%	Won ✓
1954	Frank Lausche	1,405,262	54.10%	Won ✓
1956	Michael DiSalle	1,557,103	43.96%	Lost ✗
1958	Michael DiSalle	1,869,260	56.92%	Won ✓
1962	Michael DiSalle	1,280,521	41.08%	Lost ✗
1966	Frazier Reams Jr.	1,092,054	37.82%	Lost ✗
1970	John J. Gilligan	1,725,560	54.19%	Won ✓
1974	John J. Gilligan	1,482,191	48.25%	Lost ✗
1978	Dick Celeste/Michael J. Dorrian	1,354,631	47.64%	Lost ✗
1982	Dick Celeste/Myrl Shoemaker	1,981,882	59.04%	Won ✓
1986	Dick Celeste/Paul Leonard	1,858,372	60.60%	Won ✓
1990	Anthony J. Celebrezze Jr./Eugene Branstool	1,539,416	44.27%	Lost ✗
1994	Rob Burch/Peter Lawson Jones	835,849	24.98%	Lost ✗
1998	Lee Fisher/Michael B. Coleman	1,498,956	44.69%	Lost ✗
2002	Tim Hagan/Charleta Tavares	1,236,924	38.31%	Lost ✗
2006	Ted Strickland/Lee Fisher	2,435,505	60.54%	Won ✓
2010	Ted Strickland/Yvette McGee Brown	1,812,059	47.04%	Lost ✗
2014	Ed FitzGerald/Sharen Neuhardt	1,009,359	33.03%	Lost ✗
2018	Richard Cordray/Betty Sutton	2,070,046	46.67%	Lost ✗
2022	Nan Whaley/Cheryl Stephens	1,545,489	37.38%	Lost ✗
2026	Amy Acton/David Pepper	2,405,510	52.31%	Won ✓

== See also ==
- List of Ohio politicians
- Political Party Strength in Ohio
- 2004 U.S. election voting controversies, Ohio
