= Randi Clites =

American politician (born 1975)

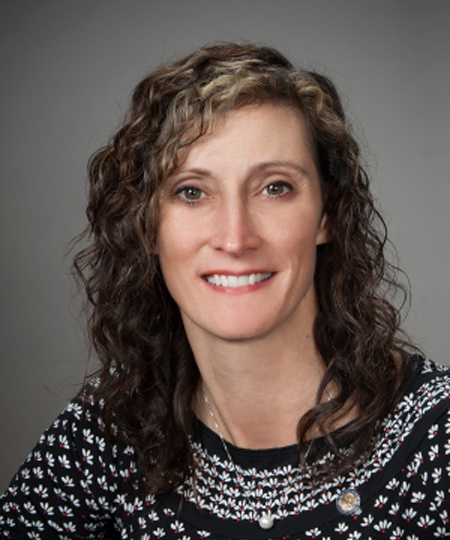

Member of the Ohio House of Representatives from the 75th district
- In office January 7, 2019 – December 31, 2020
- Preceded by: Kathleen Clyde
- Succeeded by: Gail Pavliga

Personal details
- Born: September 2, 1975 (age 51)
- Party: Democratic
- Spouse: Matt
- Education: Hiram College

Randi L. Clites (born September 2, 1975) is an American politician. In 2018, Clites was elected to the Ohio House of Representatives from the 75th district. Prior to her election to the Ohio House, Clites was a healthcare nonprofit executive, serving in leadership roles with the Northern Ohio Hemophilia Foundation and the Ohio Bleeding Disorders Council, among others.

== Early life and education ==
She was born and raised in Ravenna Township. Upon being elected for District 75, she was the associate director of the Northern Ohio Hemophilia Foundation, and was an advocacy coordinator for the Ohio Bleeding Disorders Council.

== Political career ==
=== Election ===
After claiming the nomination in a three-way primary election, Clites was elected in the general election on November 6, 2018, winning 52 percent of the vote over 48 percent of Republican candidate Jim Lutz and Green candidate Austin Bashore. She defeated Jim Lutz 21,027 votes to 19,377. She cited her "passion for Title V funding for children’s chronic health issues" as her reason for running for office. She was officially sworn in as a state representative representing Portage County's 75th district on January 7, 2019. Clites ran for re-election, but was defeated by Republican candidate Gail Pavliga on November 3, 2020.

=== Committees and bills ===
District 75 includes Brady Lake, Kent, Mogadore, Ravenna, Streetsboro, Sugar Bush Knolls, Tallmadge, as well as Atwater, Brimfield, Charlestown, Deerfield, Edinburg, Franklin, Palmyra, Paris, Randolph, Ravenna, Rootstown, and Suffield Townships in Portage County.

In April 2019, she was a supporter of the Ohio Equal Pay Act along with Stephanie Howse. Clites serves on the following committees: Agriculture and Rural Development, Aging and Long Term Care, and Health.

== Election history ==
Ohio House 75th District
Year	Democrat	Votes	Pct	Republican	Votes	Pct	Green	Votes	Pct
2020	Randi Clites	27,151	48.9%	Gail Pavliga	28,330	51.1%			
2018	Randi Clites	21,971	52.3%	Jim Lutz	19,960	47.6%	Austin Bashore (write-in)	423	1%

== Personal life ==
She lives with her husband and son in Ravenna Township.
