= Robert Reckman =

American politician

Member of the Ohio House of Representatives from the 68th district
- In office January 3, 1953 – December 31, 1968
- Preceded by: None (First)
- Succeeded by: Chester Cruze

Personal details
- Born: April 7, 1922 Ohio, U.S.
- Died: August 27, 2016 (aged 94) Cincinnati, Ohio, U.S.
- Party: Republican

Robert Frederick Reckman (April 7, 1922 – August 27, 2016) was an American attorney and politician who served as a member of the Ohio House of Representatives. He was the speaker of the Ohio House from 1965 to 1967.

In January 1953, Reckman introduced Ohio House Bill 46. The bill amended state law pertaining to municipal annexation, making it so that when a civil township is annexed by a municipality in such a way that the township's remaining unincorporated area is devoid of any resident freeholders (a status which renders the township government de facto defunct), said area is considered a part of the annexing municipality for political and administrative purposes. (This remedied the situation of Millcreek Township in Hamilton County, which had been reduced to the Wesleyan Cemetery after the other areas of the township had been annexed by the city of Cincinnati or had undertaken incorporation themselves, as in the cases of Norwood and St. Bernard.) The bill was passed and approved in July 1953 and became effective in October of the same year.

Reckman served as a private in the U.S. Navy during World War II.

Reckman died in Cincinnati, Ohio, in August 2016, at the age of 94.
