= Tavia Galonski =

American politician

- Galonski in 2026

Member of the Ohio House of Representatives from the 33rd district
- In office January 3, 2023 – January 10, 2024
- Preceded by: Sedrick Denson
- Succeeded by: Veronica Sims

Member of the Ohio House of Representatives from the 35th district
- In office May 10, 2017 – December 31, 2022
- Preceded by: Greta Johnson
- Succeeded by: Steve Demetriou

Personal details
- Born: Tavia Baxter
- Party: Democratic
- Spouse: John Galonski
- Children: 2
- Education: Emory University (BS); University of Akron (JD)

Tavia Galonski (née Baxter) is an American politician who served as a member of the Ohio House of Representatives from 2017 to 2023. A Democrat, she represented portions of Akron and Barberton in Summit County.

== Life and career ==
Galonski received her bachelor's degree from Emory University in Atlanta, Georgia, and then a Juris Doctor degree from the University of Akron School of Law. In Atlanta, Galonski worked as a flight attendant for Delta Air Lines while in school. A former Teamster, Galonski's father was a member of the United Auto Workers.

An attorney by trade, Galonski previously served as a magistrate in the Summit County Court of Common Pleas, including in the county's juvenile court. She is married to Summit County Chief Assistant Prosecutor John Galonski, and together they have two children.

== Ohio House of Representatives ==
When former Representative Greta Johnson left the General Assembly in the spring of 2017, Galonski sought the appointment to replace her. Johnson resigned from the 35th House District to work in the Summit County Law Department as Deputy Law Director. Galonski was selected to replace Johnson by House Democrats, who had the authority to appoint a replacement, and was seated on May 10, 2017. She was elected for a full, two-year term on November 6, 2018, with 61% of the vote.

In 2020, Galonski said President Donald Trump should be tried for crimes against humanity in The Hague, the site of the International Criminal Court (ICC), for recommending the use of hydroxychloroquine as a treatment for COVID-19. However, the United States is not a member of the ICC.

Galonski resigned from the Ohio House in January 2024 after being appointed as Summit County Clerk of Courts.

Political offices
| Preceded by Greta Johnson | Ohio House of Representatives, 35th District; 2017–2022 | Succeeded by Steve Demetriou |
| Preceded by Sedrick Denson | Ohio House of Representatives, 37th District; 2023–2024 | Succeeded by Veronica Sims |
