= Rick Carfagna =

American politician

Member of the Ohio House of Representatives from the 68th district
- In office January 3, 2017 – January 25, 2022
- Preceded by: Margaret Ruhl
- Succeeded by: Shawn Stevens

Personal details
- Born: Columbus, Ohio
- Party: Republican
- Spouse: Jill
- Children: 1
- Education: John Carroll University (BA)

Rick Carfagna is an American politician who served as a member of the Ohio House of Representatives for the 68th district from 2017 to 2022. A Republican, he was previously a public relations manager in the telecommunications industry.

== Early life and education ==
Carfagna was born and raised in Columbus, Ohio, where his family owns and operates a local Italian grocery, restaurant and food distributor, Carfagna’s. He graduated from St. Francis DeSales High School before attending John Carroll University.

== Career ==
Following graduation, Carfagna served on the Ohio Legislative Service Commission’s Fellowship Program and later worked as a legislative aide in the Ohio House of Representatives. He then worked as the government relations manager for Time Warner Cable from 2002 to 2017.

In 2009, Carfagna was elected to the Genoa Township Board of Trustees and was re-elected in 2013. He served as the board's president for three terms and became known as a fiscal conservative.

=== Ohio House of Representatives ===
In 2016 four-term incumbent Ohio state representative Margaret Ruhl was term-limited. With the seat heavily-Republican, the primary election attracted a number of candidates. In a five-way primary, Carfagna's family name recognition made him an early favorite. His closest adversary was said to be Beth Lear, another former legislative staffer. Carfagna won the primary, taking a plurality of nearly 43% of the vote, with Lear taking 34%. In the general election, facing Democrat John Russell and write-in candidate Douglas Crowl, Carfagna won with 65.97% of the votes.

In the Ohio legislature, Carfagna had been heavily involved in broadband policy. In January 2022, Carfagna resigned from the House to take a lobbying position with the Ohio Chamber of Commerce.

== Personal life ==
Carfagna is married and has one daughter.
