= Mary Lightbody =

American politician from Ohio (born 1952)

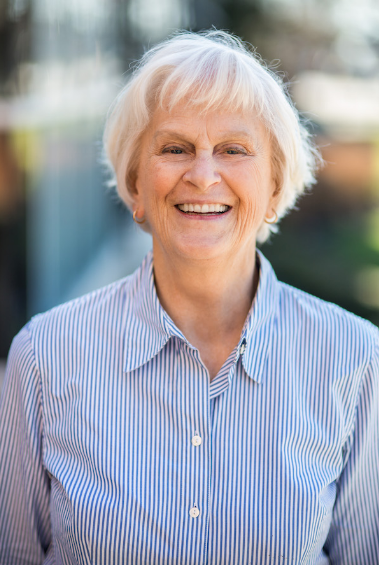

Member of the Ohio House of Representatives from the 4th district
- In office January 7, 2019 – January 9, 2024
- Preceded by: Anne Gonzales
- Succeeded by: Beryl Piccolantonio

Personal details
- Born: July 17, 1952 (age 74)
- Party: Democratic
- Education: Harvard University (BA); Ohio State University (PhD, MEd)
- Occupation: Educator

Mary Lightbody (born July 17, 1952) is an American educator and politician who was a member of the Ohio House of Representatives from the 4th district in Franklin County from 2019 until 2024.

Lightbody was a Senior Lecturer in the Department of Education at the Ohio State University, Newark Campus and previously taught at Otterbein University.

== Ohio House of Representatives ==
=== Election ===
Lightbody was elected in the general election on November 6, 2018, winning 55 percent of the vote over 45 percent of Republican candidate Tim Barhorst, flipping the seat from Republican control to Democratic control.

=== Committees ===
Lightbody served on the following committees: Agriculture and Rural Development, Commerce and Labor, and Higher Education.

== Election history ==
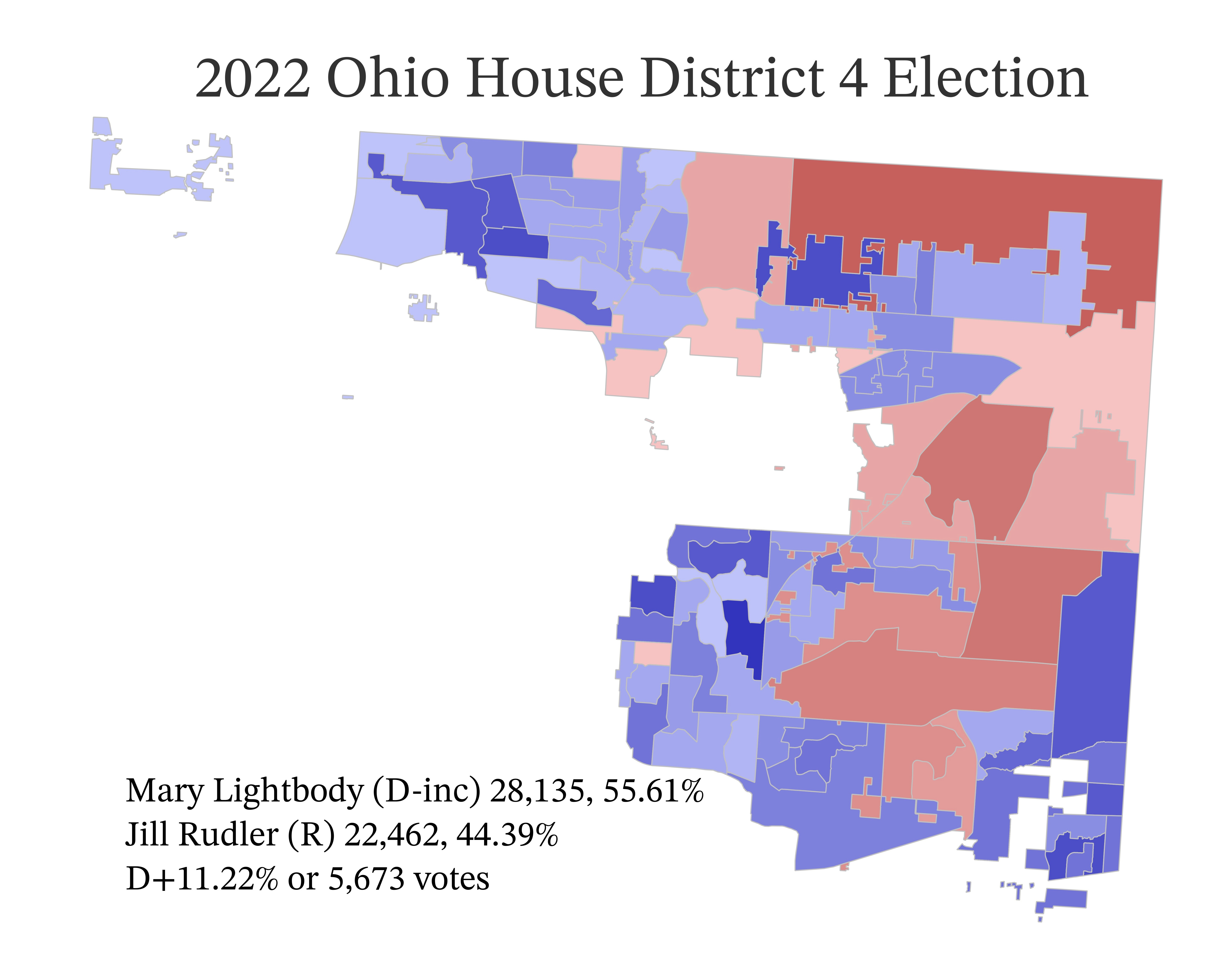

Ohio House 19th District
Year	Democrat	Votes	Pct	Republican	Votes	Pct
2018	Mary Lightbody	33,025	55.67%	Tim Barhorst	26,293	44.33%
2020	Mary Lightbody	42,267	56.19%	Meredith Freedhoff	32,950	43.81%

Ohio House 4th District
Year	Democrat	Votes	Pct	Republican	Votes	Pct
2022	Mary Lightbody	28,135	55.61%	Jill Rudler	22,462	44.39%
