= Ohio's 23rd House of Representatives district =

American legislative district

Ohio's 23rd State House of Representatives district
Representative
Dan Troy; D–Willowick
- Population (2020): 124,913

Ohio's 23rd House of Representatives district is currently represented by Democrat Dan Troy. It includes part of eastern Cuyahoga County (Gates Mills, Mayfield, Richmond Heights) and part of western Lake County (Eastlake, Lakeline, Mentor (part), Mentor-on-the-Lake, Timberlake, Wickliffe, Willoughby, Willoughby Hills, Willowick).

== List of members representing the district ==
Member	Party	Years	General Assembly	Electoral history
District established January 2, 1967.
Dennis Dannley (Medina)	Republican	January 2, 1967 – March 27, 1968	107th	Elected in 1966. Resigned to become Medina County Probate Court judge.
Vacant		March 27, 1968 – December 31, 1968	107th	
William G. Batchelder (Medina)	Republican	January 6, 1969 – December 31, 1972	108th 109th	Elected in 1968. Re-elected in 1970. Redistricted to the 93rd district.
William L. Mallory Sr. (Cincinnati)	Democratic	January 1, 1973 – December 31, 1992	110th 111th 112th 113th 114th 115th 116th 117th 118th 119th	Redistricted from the 72nd district and re-elected in 1972. Re-elected in 1974. Re-elected in 1976. Re-elected in 1978. Re-elected in 1980. Re-elected in 1982. Re-elected in 1984. Re-elected in 1986. Re-elected in 1988. Re-elected in 1990. Redistricted to the 31st district.
Mike Stinziano (Columbus)	Democratic	January 4, 1993 – December 31, 1994	120th	Redistricted from the 30th district and re-elected in 1992. Lost re-election.
Amy Salerno (Columbus)	Republican	January 2, 1995 – December 31, 2002	121st 122nd 123rd 124th	Elected in 1994. Re-elected in 1996. Re-elected in 1998. Re-elected in 2000. Term-limited.
Larry Wolpert (Hilliard)	Republican	January 6, 2003 – December 31, 2008	125th 126th 127th	Redistricted from the 29th district and re-elected in 2002. Re-elected in 2004. Re-elected in 2006. Term-limited.
Cheryl Grossman (Grove City)	Republican	January 5, 2009 – December 31, 2016	128th 129th 130th 131st	Elected in 2008. Re-elected in 2010. Re-elected in 2012. Re-elected in 2014. Term-limited.
Laura Lanese (Grove City)	Republican	January 2, 2017 – December 31, 2022	132nd 133rd 134th	Elected in 2016. Re-elected in 2018. Re-elected in 2020. Redistricted to the 10th district and retired.
Dan Troy (Willowick)	Democratic	January 2, 2023 – present	135th	Redistricted from the 60th district and re-elected in 2022.
