= Gail Pavliga =

American politician

Member of the Ohio House of Representatives from the 72nd district
- In office January 3, 2023 – January 9, 2025
- Preceded by: Kevin D. Miller
- Succeeded by: Heidi Workman

Member of the Ohio House of Representatives from the 75th district
- In office January 4, 2021 – December 31, 2022
- Preceded by: Randi Clites
- Succeeded by: Haraz Ghanbari

Personal details
- Party: Republican
- Spouse: Frank
- Education: BA, MA, Kent State University; Ph.D., Educational Psychology, 2008, University of Akron
- Website: gailpavliga.com

Gail Pavliga is the former state representative for the 72nd District of the Ohio House of Representatives. She is a Republican. Prior to joining politics, Pavliga was a counselor and adjunct professor at Malone University.

== Early life ==
Pavliga earned her bachelor's degree in Psychology/Science and master's degree in Individual/Family Studies/Counseling from Kent State University before enrolling at the University of Akron for her PhD in Educational Psychology.

== Politics ==
Gail Pavliga first ran for State Representative in 2020 for what was the 75th District at the time. She went unopposed in the primary and faced incumbent Democrat Randi Clites in general election. Pavliga would defeat Clites with 51.1% of the vote.

== Personal life ==
Pavliga and her husband Frank have two children together: Katie and Steve.

Political offices
Preceded by Randi Clites	Ohio House of Representatives, 75th District; 2021–2022	Succeeded by Haraz Ghanbari
Preceded by Kevin D. Miller	Ohio House of Representatives, 72nd District; 2023-2025	Succeeded by Heidi Workman
