= Chester Cruze =

American politician

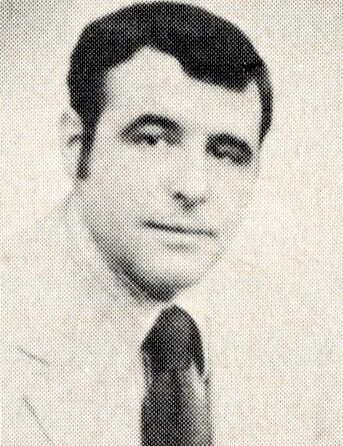

Member of the Ohio House of Representatives
- In office January 1, 1973 – April 6, 1977
- Preceded by: Vern Riffe
- Succeeded by: Edith Mayer
- Constituency: 22nd district
- In office January 6, 1969 – December 31, 1972
- Preceded by: Robert Reckman
- Succeeded by: John Johnson
- Constituency: 68th district

Personal details
- Born: Chester T. Cruze; 1938 or 1939 (age 86–87)
- Party: Republican

Chester T. Cruze (born c. 1939) is a former member of the Ohio House of Representatives.
