= Edith Mayer =

American politician

Member of the Ohio House of Representatives from the 22nd district
- In office April 27, 1977-December 31, 1982
- Preceded by: Chester Cruze
- Succeeded by: Lou Blessing

Personal details
- Born: Edith Peacock; July 24, 1929 (age 96) Cincinnati, Ohio
- Party: Republican
- Spouse: Charles DeWolf Mayer (m. 1959; died 2020)
- Children: 2

Edith Peacock Mayer (July 24, 1929 – November 4, 2025) was a former member of the Ohio House of Representatives for the 22nd district from 1977 to 1982.

== Career ==
Mayer was appointed to the Ohio House of Representatives on April 27, 1977 after incumbent representative Chester Cruze resigned. After finishing Cruze's term, she served two full terms before being redistricted to the 27th district in 1982 alongside fellow Republican incumbent Dale Van Vyven, and subsequently lost re-nomination.

== Personal life ==
In February 1958, Mayer met her husband Charles DeWolf Mayer on a blind date and were married at the Holy Trinity Episcopal Church in Cincinnati on April 24, 1959. They had two children, Sandra and Charles Jr. After retiring, they moved to Aiken, South Carolina. Charles died on June 11, 2020. Edith Peacock Mayer died on November 4, 2025.
