= Terry Tranter =

American politician

Member of the Ohio House of Representatives from the 24th district
- In office January 6, 1976 – December 31, 1992
- Preceded by: Jim Luken
- Succeeded by: Jo Ann Davidson

Personal details
- Party: Democratic

Terry M. Tranter is a former member of the Ohio House of Representatives. He was appointed to the 24th House district on January 6, 1976 to finish Jim Luken's term and subsequently served eight full terms until he lost re-election in 1992.
