= Shawn Stevens =

American politician

Member-elect of the Ohio House of Representatives
- Assuming office January 4, 2027
- Succeeding: Beth Lear
- Constituency: 61st district
- In office March 9, 2022 – December 31, 2022
- Preceded by: Rick Carfagna
- Succeeded by: Thaddeus Claggett
- Constituency: 68th district

Personal details
- Party: Republican
- Children: 3
- Education: Miami University (BA); Ohio State University (MBA)

Shawn Stevens is an American politician and businessman who served as a member of the Ohio House of Representatives from the 68th district from March to December 2022. He is currently running in the 61st District.

== Education ==
Stevens earned a Bachelor of Arts degree in economics from Miami University and a Master of Business Administration from the Fisher College of Business at Ohio State University.

== Career ==
From 2004 to 2011, Stevens worked as a banker at JPMorgan Chase. He served as chair of the Delaware County Republican Party from 2010 to 2014 and president of the Ohio Association of Election Officials in 2015 and 2016. From 2011 to 2017, he was a partner at the Great American Title Agency. Stevens is the owner of Bridge Title and Escrow Services in Westerville, Ohio. In March 2022, Stevens was appointed to succeed Rick Carfagna in the Ohio House of Representatives.

On Dec 11, 2025, Stevens announced he was running for House District 61.
