= Cheryl Grossman =

American politician

Member of the Ohio House of Representatives from the 23rd district
- In office January 5, 2009 – December 31, 2016
- Preceded by: Larry Wolpert
- Succeeded by: Laura Lanese

Personal details
- Born: October 15, 1950 (age 75) Grove City, Ohio, U.S.
- Party: Republican
- Education: Grove City High School
- Profession: Nationwide Development Company

Cheryl Grossman (born October 15, 1950) is a former Republican member of the Ohio House of Representatives, who represented the 23rd District from 2009 to 2016. She served as assistant majority whip in the 129th General Assembly.

== Career ==
Grossman served on the planning commission and city council before becoming Mayor of Grove City, Ohio in 1996, serving until 2008. Grossman also was in the running in 2003 to replace Priscilla Mead in the state Senate, but Steve Stivers was chosen instead.

== Ohio House of Representatives ==
With incumbent Larry Wolpert unable to run again due to term limits, Grossman entered the race to replace him, and was endorsed by Wolpert. Facing no opposition in the primary, Grossman went on to run against Democrat Keith Goldhardt in the general election. She went on to defeat Goldhardt by about 11,000 votes.

When Kris Jordan stepped down as assistant minority whip midway through 2009 to run for the state Senate, Grossman was appointed to the position.

For the 2010 election, Grossman was up for reelection against Democrat Steven Harp as well as a Libertarian candidate. She went on to beat Harp by 15,000 votes. Subsequently, Republicans retook the House of Representatives' majority, and Grossman was tabbed to serve as assistant majority whip for the 129th General Assembly. She also is serving as a member of the Economic and Small Business Development Committee; the Finance and Appropriations Committee and Transportation Subcommittee; the Rules and Reference Committee; and the State Government and Elections Committee; the Ohio Legislative Service Commission; and the Ohio Cultural Facilities Commission.

Grossman won a third term in 2012 with 56.07% of the vote over Democrat Traci Johnson. She won a fourth term in 2014 with nearly 64% of the vote.

== Initiatives and positions ==
Issuing a statement 100 days into the 129th Ohio General Assembly, Grossman has stated that the Republican caucus has focused on jobs, government and accountability.

Fiscal initiatives

Early on in her second term, Grossman, along with Jay Hottinger introduced legislation that sought to do away with the Ohio estate tax. "For over four decades, Ohio's estate tax has taken direct aim at its middle class, most notably its homeowners, farmers and small business owners," Rep. Grossman has said. "It has been a driving force for moving wealth and investments out of the state and a major contributor to the unfriendly business climate that has plagued Ohio's entrepreneurial class for too long."

A supporter of S.B. 5 which limits collective bargaining for public employees, Grossman voted for its passage out of the Ohio House of Representatives.

Grossman stated that the Ohio House of Representatives saved almost a quarter of a million dollars through the elimination of standing committees. This statement was determined to be "barely true" in a researched report by Politifact.

Business initiatives

Grossman, along with Terry Boose, has also introduced an initiative to put on hold most new safety regulations for trucks weighing more than 10,000 pounds. Grossman has argued the new regulations are unnecessary and a burden for businesses. "I can't justify enforcement of any of these rules," said Grossman.

In a safety initiative, Grossman has opted introduce legislation that would allow BMV workers to ask Ohio drivers for emergency contact information to be used in instances of emergencies. It would not be a requirement, but rather an option for individuals to consider.

Social initiatives

With help from the American Heart Association, Grossman has introduced a bill that would require CPR training to young persons getting ready to obtain a driver's license. Grossman believes that it would give youth a "skill for a lifetime" to put to good use saving lives.
