= Sedrick Denson =

American politician (born 1987)

Member of the Ohio House of Representatives from the 26th district
- In office January 3, 2023 – August 8, 2025
- Preceded by: Latyna Humphrey
- Succeeded by: Ashley Bryant Bailey

Member of the Ohio House of Representatives from the 33rd district
- In office January 7, 2019 – December 31, 2022
- Preceded by: Alicia Reece
- Succeeded by: Tavia Galonski

Personal details
- Born: December 10, 1987 (age 38)
- Party: Democratic
- Education: University of Cincinnati (BA)
- Occupation: Non-profit executive

Sedrick A. Denson (born December 10, 1987) is an American politician who served as the state representative for the 26th district of the Ohio House of Representatives. He is a Democrat. His district consisted of portions of Hamilton County, Ohio.

== Ohio House of Representatives ==
=== Election ===
Denson was elected in the general election on November 6, 2018, winning 75 percent of the vote over 25 percent of Republican candidate Judith Boyce.

=== Committees ===
Denson serves on the following committees: Energy and Natural Resources, Ways and Means, Financial Institutions, and Public Utilities.

=== Resignation ===
Denson resigned from the Ohio House in August 2025 in order to pursue other opportunities.

== Election history ==
Ohio House 33rd District
Year	Democrat	Votes	Pct	Republican	Votes	Pct
2018	Sedrick Denson	34,011	75.73%	Judith Boyce	10,899	24.27%
2020	Sedrick Denson	41,500	74.9%	Mary Hill	13,901	25.1%

== Personal life ==
Denson pleaded guilty to operating a motor vehicle while impaired in April 2019.
