= Richard Dell'Aquila =

American politician

Member of the Ohio House of Representatives from the 15th district
- In office 2022 – December 31, 2024
- Preceded by: Jeff Crossman
- Succeeded by: Chris Glassburn

Personal details
- Party: Democratic
- Education: Kent State; Cleveland-Marshall College of Law
- Occupation: Politician

Richard "Rick" Dell'Aquila is an American politician who served as a member of the Ohio House of Representatives for the 15th District as a member of the Democratic Party, afrom 2022 to 2024. He did not run for re-election in 2024 instead filing, but ultimately withdrawing, to run for District 6 on the Cuyahoga County Council.
