= Larry Wolpert =

American politician

Member of the Ohio House of Representatives from the 23rd district
- In office January 3, 2001 – December 31, 2008
- Preceded by: Bill Schuck
- Succeeded by: Cheryl Grossman

Personal details
- Born: April 5, 1956 (age 70) Columbus, Ohio
- Party: Republican
- Education: Ohio State University, Capital University
- Profession: Insurance

Larry Wolpert (born April 5, 1956) is a former Republican member of the Ohio House of Representatives, who represented the 23rd District from 2001 to 2008. He is the executive director on the Joint Committee on Agency Rule Review.

== Life and career ==
Wolpert is a graduate of Ohio State University and Capital University. He has had a career in insurance, including with Grange Insurance. He worked in that industry until seeking election to the Ohio House. Wolpert is married and has a stepson.

In 1992, Wolpert was elected to Hilliard City Council, and served in that capacity until 2000. He also served on the Ohio Elections Commission.

== Ohio House of Representatives ==
In 2000, Representative Bill Schuck retired, and Wolpert replaced him in the Ohio House of Representatives. Unopposed for the nomination, he won the general election with 61.9% of the vote. He was unopposed for reelection in 2002 and 2004, and won a fourth term in 2006 with 56.47% of the vote.

Throughout his tenure in the House, Wolpert served as Chairman of the Township and Government Committee, and of the Subcommittee on Growth and Land Use in the Ohio 125th General Assembly. He again served as Chair of the Local Government Committee in the 126th General Assembly, and the 127th General Assembly.

Term limits required Wolpert to leave the House in 2008, and he was succeeded by Cheryl Grossman. He has since become the executive director of the Joint Committee of Agency Rule Review.
