= Laura Lanese =

American politician from Ohio

Member of the Ohio House of Representatives from the 23rd district
- Incumbent
- Assumed office January 3, 2017
- Preceded by: Cheryl Grossman

Personal details
- Party: Republican
- Spouse: Mike Lanese
- Children: 3
- Education: Miami University (BA); Ohio State University (JD); Georgetown University (LLM)

Laura Lanese is the state representative for the 23rd District of the Ohio House of Representatives. She is a Republican. The district consists of portions Columbus and Grove City in Franklin County.

== Life and career ==
Lanese graduated from Miami University before attaining her law degree from Ohio State University and her masters in law from Georgetown University. Lanese formerly worked as an attorney with the United States Department of Justice, an instructor at a community college and a graduate teaching and research assistant. She also worked as a pro se habeas corpus law clerk for the United States District Court in the Southern District of Ohio.

A veteran of the Ohio Air National Guard and the US Army Reserve, Lanese first ran for office successfully at the local level, winning an At-Large seat on the Grove City City Council, and serving from 2013 to 2016. She had long been active in local initiatives. Lanese is married to former Ohio State football player Mike Lanese. She is a mother of three.

== Ohio House of Representatives ==
In 2016, Representative Cheryl Grossman was term-limited, and while competitive on paper, Republicans were favored to hold the seat. Initially Mike Lanese opted to run, and won the Republican nomination for the seat. However, he eventually stepped down, and Franklin County Republicans were able to replace him on the ballot with Laura Lanese.

While Democrats put considerable resources behind Democrat Lee Schreiner, Lanese won the seat handily by a nearly 58% to 42% margin. She was sworn in for her first term on January 3, 2017.

Political offices
Preceded by Cheryl Grossman	Member of the Ohio House of Representatives from the 23rd district 2017–present	Incumbent
