= Ohio's 15th House of Representatives district =

American legislative district

Ohio's 15th State House of Representatives district
Representative
| Chris Glassburn; D–North Olmsted |
- Population (2020): 125,126

Ohio's 15th House of Representatives district is currently represented by Democrat Richard Dell'Aquila. It is located entirely within Cuyahoga County and includes the cities of Broadview Heights, Brooklyn, Brooklyn Heights, North Royalton, Seven Hills, and part of Cleveland.

== List of members representing the district ==
| Member | Party | Years | General Assembly | Electoral history |
|---|---|---|---|---|
District established January 2, 1967.
| Robert Carpenter (Tiffin) | Republican | January 2, 1967 – December 31, 1970 | 107th 108th | Elected in 1966. Re-elected in 1968. Retired. |
| Paul Pfeifer (Bucyrus) | Republican | January 4, 1971 – December 31, 1972 | 109th | Elected in 1970. Redistricted to the 85th district and lost re-nomination. |
| John D. Thompson Jr. (Cleveland) | Democratic | January 1, 1973 – December 31, 1982 | 110th 111th 112th 113th 114th | Redistricted from the 44th district and re-elected in 1972. Re-elected in 1974. Re-elected in 1976. Re-elected in 1978. Re-elected in 1980. Redistricted to the 16th district. |
| Mary O. Boyle (Cleveland Heights) | Democratic | January 3, 1983 – December 31, 1984 | 115th | Redistricted from the 14th district and re-elected in 1982. Retired to run for Cuyahoga County Commissioner. |
| Jane L. Campbell (Cleveland) | Democratic | January 7, 1985 – December 31, 1992 | 116th 117th 118th 119th | Elected in 1984. Re-elected in 1986. Re-elected in 1988. Re-elected in 1990. Redistricted to the 11th district. |
| Mike Wise (Broadview Heights) | Republican | January 4, 1993 – December 31, 1998 | 120th 121st 122nd | Elected in 1992. Re-elected in 1994. Re-elected in 1996. Retired. |
| Jim Trakas (Independence) | Republican | January 4, 1999 – December 31, 2002 | 123rd 124th | Elected in 1998. Re-elected in 2000. Redistricted to the 17th district. |
| Dean DePiero (Parma) | Democratic | January 6, 2003 – December 2, 2003 | 125th | Redistricted from the 20th district and re-elected in 2002. Resigned to become mayor of Parma. |
| Timothy J. DeGeeter (Parma) | Democratic | December 2, 2003 – December 31, 2011 | 125th 126th 127th 128th 129th | Appointed to finish DePiero's term. Re-elected in 2004. Re-elected in 2006. Re-elected in 2008. Re-elected in 2010. Resigned to become mayor of Parma. |
| Vacant | | December 31, 2011 – January 25, 2012 | 129th | |
| Nicholas J. Celebrezze (Parma) | Democratic | January 25, 2012 – December 31, 2018 | 129th 130th 131st 132nd | Appointed to finish DeGeeter's term. Re-elected in 2012. Re-elected in 2014. Re-elected in 2016. Retired. |
| Jeffrey Crossman (Parma) | Democratic | January 7, 2019 – December 31, 2022 | 133rd 134th | Elected in 2018. Re-elected in 2020. Retired to run for Ohio Attorney General. |
| Richard Dell'Aquila (Seven Hills) | Democratic | January 2, 2023 – 2025 | 135th | Elected in 2022. |
| Chris Glassburn | Democratic | January 2, 2025 – present | 136th | Elected in 2024. |
