= Thaddeus Claggett =

American politician

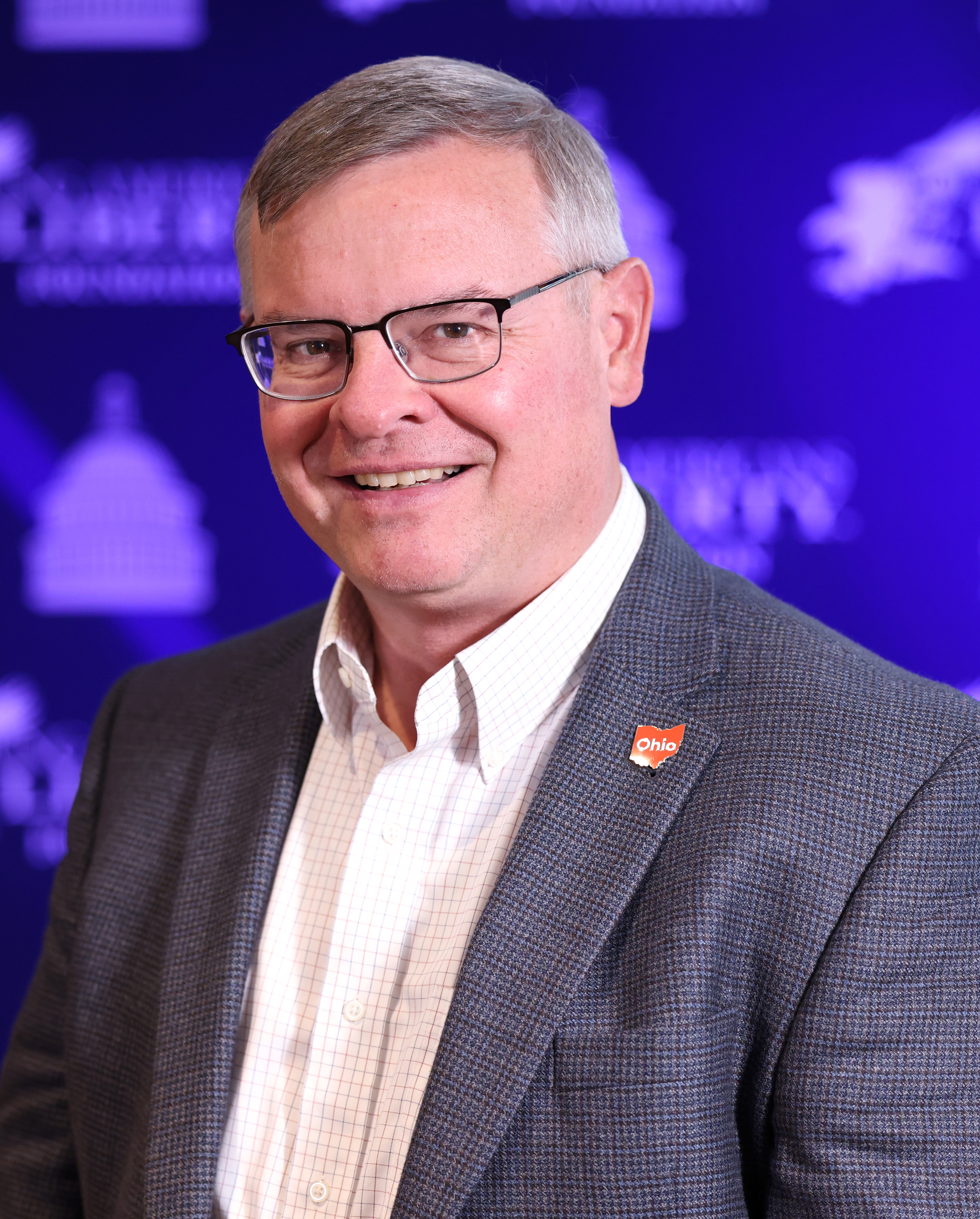
- Claggett at the 2024 Hazlitt Summit hosted by Young Americans for Liberty Foundation

Member of the Ohio House of Representatives from the 68th district
- Incumbent
- Assumed office January 1, 2023
- Preceded by: Shawn Stevens

Personal details
- Party: Republican

Thaddeus J. Claggett is an American politician. He serves as a Republican member for the 68th district of the Ohio House of Representatives.

== Life and career ==
Claggett was a businessperson.

In August 2022, Claggett defeated Mark Fraizer in the Republican primary election for the 68th district of the Ohio House of Representatives. In November 2022, he defeated write-in candidate Daniel Crawford in the general election. He succeeded Shawn Stevens. He assumed office in 2023.

=== Committee assignments ===
As of June 2026, Claggett serves on the following committees in the Ohio House.

- Technology and Innovation (chair)
- Commerce and Labor
- Government Oversight
- Public Insurance and Pensions
- Select Committee on Data Centers
