= Ismail Mohamed (Ohio politician) =

American politician

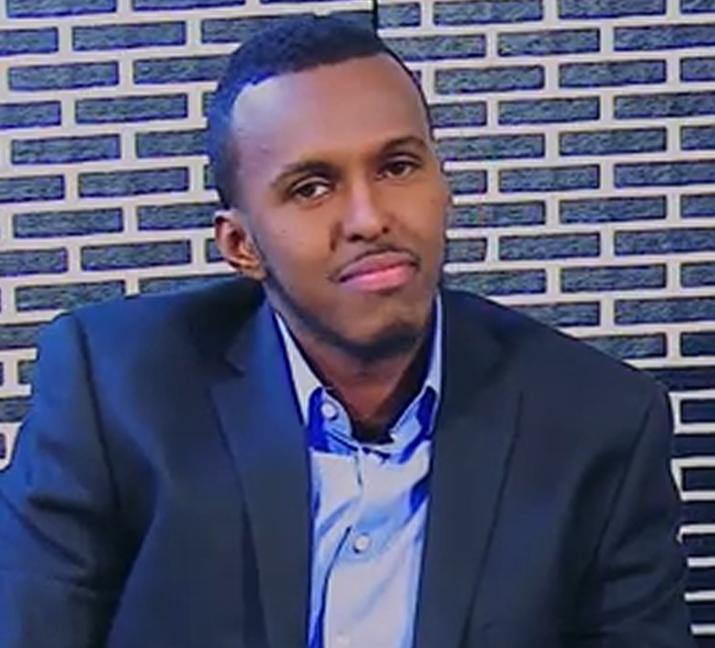

Member of the Ohio House of Representatives from the 3rd district
- Incumbent
- Assumed office January 1, 2023
- Preceded by: Haraz Ghanbari

Personal details
- Born: Ismail Ali Mohamed; September 3, 1992 Somalia
- Party: Democratic
- Education: Ohio State University (BA, JD)

Ismail Ali Mohamed is the first Somali male representative to serve in the Ohio State Legislature. He is the representative for Ohio House District 3. He won the primary on August 2, 2022, and won in the November 2022 general election.

Mohamed was born into a refugee family that was displaced from Somalia to Kenya and Ethiopia before eventually seeking refuge in the United States and attending Northland High School. Mohamed is an alum of the Moritz College of Law.

In 2022, Mohamed took office after unseating Republican J. Josiah Lanning with about 80% of the vote. Mohamed is one of the city's first Somali-born attorneys licensed to practice in Ohio. His priorities have included lowering housing costs, supporting small businesses and increased funding for public education.

Mohamed, who backs congressional term limits, is also a member of the Ohio Legislative Black Caucus and has pushed for expungement for minor marijuana offenses. In 2025, Mohamed introduced a bill that would increase the minimum wage.
