= Chris Glassburn =

American politician

Member of the Ohio House of Representatives from the 15th district
- Incumbent
- Assumed office December 1, 2024
- Preceded by: Richard Dell'Aquila

Personal details
- Born: Painesville, Ohio
- Party: Democratic
- Website: chrisglassburn.com

Chris Glassburn is an American politician serving as a member of the Ohio House of Representatives from the 15th district. A Democrat, he was elected in the 2024 Ohio House of Representatives election.

Glassburn was born in Painesville and raised in North Olmsted. He graduated from high school in North Olmsted and subsequently from Baldwin Wallace College with a bachelor's degree in history. He served on the North Olmsted School Board and City Council for prior to his election to state house.

Glassburn is a member of the Energy, Finance, Public Insurance and Pensions, Redistricting, and Ways and Means committees.
