= Ohio's 26th House of Representatives district =

American legislative district

Ohio's 26th State House of Representatives district
Representative
Ashley Bryant Bailey; D–Cincinnati
- Population (2020): 120,124

Ohio's 26th House of Representatives district is currently represented by Democrat Ashley Bryant Bailey. It is located entirely within Hamilton County and includes the municipalities of Amberley, Arlington Heights, Fairfax, Lincoln Heights, Lockland, Mariemont, Silverton, Woodlawn, Wyoming, and part of Cincinnati; it also includes part of Columbia, Springfield, and Sycamore Townships.

== List of members representing the district ==
Member	Party	Years	General Assembly	Electoral history
District established January 2, 1967.
Carlton Davidson (Ironton)	Republican	January 2, 1967 – December 31, 1972	107th 108th 109th	Elected in 1966. Re-elected in 1968. Re-elected in 1970. Retired.
Helen Fix (Cincinnati)	Republican	January 1, 1973 – December 31, 1982	110th 111th 112th 113th 114th	Elected in 1972. Re-elected in 1974. Re-elected in 1976. Re-elected in 1978. Re-elected in 1980. Retired to run for Ohio Secretary of State.
John O'Brien (Cincinnati)	Republican	January 3, 1983 – March 30, 1985	115th 116th	Redistricted from the 65th district and re-elected in 1982. Re-elected in 1984. Died.
Vacant		March 30, 1985 – May 7, 1985	116th	
Jacquelyn K. O'Brien (Cincinnati)	Republican	May 7, 1985 – December 31, 1992	116th 117th 118th 119th	Appointed to finish O'Brien's term. Re-elected in 1986. Re-elected in 1988. Re-elected in 1990. Redistricted to the 37th district.
Pat Tiberi (Galena)	Republican	January 4, 1993 – December 31, 2000	120th 121st 122nd 123rd	Elected in 1992. Re-elected in 1994. Re-elected in 1996. Re-elected in 1998. Retired to run for U.S. Representative.
Linda Reidelbach (Columbus)	Republican	January 1, 2001 – December 31, 2002	124th	Elected in 2000. Redistricted to the 21st district.
Larry Price (Columbus)	Democratic	January 6, 2003 – December 31, 2004	125th	Elected in 2002. Lost re-nomination.
Mike Mitchell (Columbus)	Democratic	January 3, 2005 – December 31, 2006	126th	Elected in 2004. Lost re-nomination.
Tracy Maxwell Heard (Columbus)	Democratic	January 1, 2007 – December 31, 2014	127th 128th 129th 130th	Elected in 2006. Re-elected in 2008. Re-elected in 2010. Re-elected in 2012. Term-limited.
Hearcel Craig (Columbus)	Democratic	January 5, 2015 – December 31, 2018	131st 132nd	Elected in 2014. Re-elected in 2016. Retired to run for state senator.
Erica Crawley (Columbus)	Democratic	January 7, 2019 – June 28, 2021	133rd 134th	Elected in 2018. Re-elected in 2020. Resigned to become Franklin County Commissioner.
Vacant		June 28, 2021 – October 13, 2021	134th	
Latyna Humphrey (Columbus)	Democratic	October 13, 2021 – December 31, 2022	134th	Appointed to finish Crawley's term. Redistricted to the 2nd district.
Sedrick Denson (Cincinnati)	Democratic	January 2, 2023 – October 1, 2025	135th	Redistricted from the 33rd district and re-elected in 2022. Resigned in August 2025 to follow other pursuits.
Ashley Bryant Bailey (Cincinnati)	Democratic	October 1, 2025 – Present	135th	Selected to finish the remainder of Denson's term after his resignation.
