= Ohio's 24th House of Representatives district =

American legislative district

Ohio's 24th State House of Representatives district
Representative
Dani Isaacsohn; D–Cincinnati
- Population (2020): 122,543

Ohio's 24th House of Representatives district is currently represented by Democrat Dani Isaacsohn. It is located entirely within Hamilton County and includes part of the city of Cincinnati.

== List of members representing the district ==
Member	Party	Years	General Assembly	Electoral history
District established January 2, 1967.
Ralph E. Fisher (Wooster)	Republican	January 2, 1967 – December 31, 1970	107th 108th	Elected in 1966. Elected in 1968. Lost re-election.
John Johnson (Orrville)	Democratic	January 4, 1971 – December 31, 1972	109th	Elected in 1970. Redistricted to the 68th district.
Jim Luken (Cincinnati)	Democratic	January 1, 1973 – December 1, 1975	110th 111th	Elected in 1972. Re-elected in 1974. Resigned to become Cincinnati City Councilor.
Vacant		December 1, 1975 – January 6, 1976	111th	
Terry Tranter (Cincinnati)	Democratic	January 6, 1976 – December 31, 1992	111th 112th 113th 114th 115th 116th 117th 118th 119th	Appointed to finish Luken's term. Re-elected in 1976. Re-elected in 1978. Re-elected in 1980. Re-elected in 1982. Re-elected in 1984. Re-elected in 1986. Re-elected in 1988. Re-elected in 1990. Redistricted to the 32nd district and lost re-election.
Jo Ann Davidson (Reynoldsburg)	Republican	January 4, 1993 – December 31, 2000	120th 121st 122nd 123rd	Redistricted from the 34th district and re-elected in 1992. Re-elected in 1994. Re-elected in 1996. Re-elected in 1998. Term-limited.
Larry L. Flowers (Canal Winchester)	Republican	January 1, 2001 – December 31, 2002	124th	Elected in 2000. Redistricted to the 19th district.
Geoffrey C. Smith (Columbus)	Republican	January 6, 2003 – December 31, 2006	125th 126th	Redistricted from the 28th district and re-elected in 2002. Re-elected in 2004. Lost re-election.
Ted Celeste (Grandview Heights)	Democratic	January 1, 2007 – December 31, 2012	127th 128th 129th	Elected in 2006. Re-elected in 2008. Re-elected in 2010. Retired to run for U.S. Representative.
Stephanie Kunze (Hilliard)	Republican	January 7, 2013 – December 31, 2016	130th 131st	Elected in 2012. Re-elected in 2014. Retired to run for state senator.
Jim Hughes (Upper Arlington)	Republican	January 2, 2017 – December 31, 2018	132nd	Elected in 2016. Retired to run for Franklin County Common Pleas Court judge.
Allison Russo (Upper Arlington)	Democratic	January 7, 2019 – December 31, 2022	133rd 134th	Elected in 2018. Re-elected in 2020. Redistricted to the 7th district.
Dani Isaacsohn (Cincinnati)	Democratic	January 2, 2023 – present	135th	Elected in 2022.
