= Ashley Bryant Bailey =

American politician

Member of the Ohio House of Representatives from the 26th district
- Incumbent
- Assumed office October 1, 2025
- Preceded by: Sedrick Denson

Personal details
- Born: Cincinnati, Ohio, U.S.
- Education: University of Cincinnati
- Website: ashleyforohio.com

Ashley Bryant Bailey is an American politician who is currently serving as a Democratic member of the Ohio House of Representatives, representing the 26th district. She was selected by the Ohio House Democratic Caucus on October 1, 2025, to serve the remainder of Sedrick Denson's term following his resignation on August 8, 2025. She is running for a full term in 2026.

== Personal life and career ==
Bryant Bailey was born and raised in Roselawn, a neighborhood of Cincinnati. She graduated from Walnut Hills High School and later attended the University of Cincinnati. She is a senior advisor for Higher Heights of America, a political action group aiming to elect more black women to office.
