= Heidi Workman =

American politician

Member of the Ohio House of Representatives from the 72nd district
- Incumbent
- Assumed office January 9, 2025
- Preceded by: Gail Pavliga

Personal details
- Party: Republican
- Education: BA, Kent State University
- Website: heidiworkman.com

Heidi Workman is the current representative of the 72nd district of the Ohio House of Representatives. She is a member of the Republican Party.

Heidi Workman first ran in the primaries of the 2024 Ohio House of Representatives election, in which she won the Republican primary against incumbent Gail Pavliga for the 72nd district seat. She won the general election later that year.

== Committee assignments ==
As of June 2026, Workman serves on the following committees in the Ohio House.

- Technology and Innovation (vice chair)
- Government Oversight
- Natural Resources
- Workforce and Higher Education
- Select Committee on Data Centers
