= Beryl Piccolantonio =

American politician

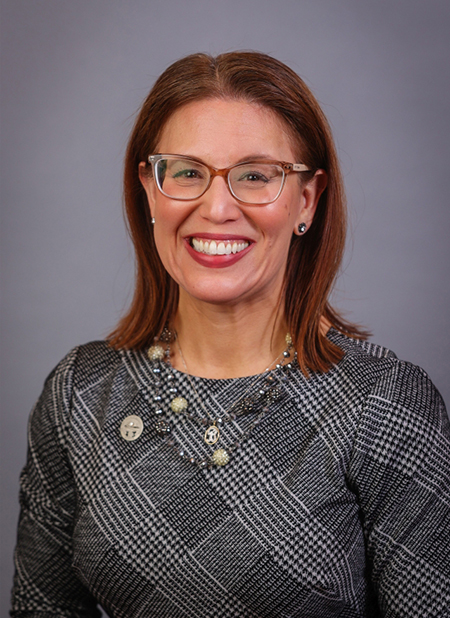

Member of the Ohio House of Representatives from the 4th district
- Incumbent
- Assumed office January 10, 2024
- Preceded by: Mary Lightbody

Personal details
- Party: Democratic
- Parent: Eric Brown (father)
- Education: Ohio Dominican University (BA); Ohio State University Moritz College of Law (JD)
- Occupation: Politician
- Profession: Attorney
- Website: berylforohio.com

Beryl Brown Piccolantonio serves as a member of the Ohio House of Representatives for the 4th District, affiliating with the Democratic Party, a position she has held since 2024. Piccolantonio was appointed to the position following the resignation of Mary Lightbody.

Piccolantonio's 4th District includes the communities of Gahanna, Westerville, New Albany, and Blacklick. During her freshman term, she served on the Joint Committee on Agency Rule Review, the Children and Human Services, Education, and Finance committees, and is Ranking Member of the Workforce and Higher Education Committee.

A graduate of Ohio Dominican University and the Ohio State University Moritz College of Law, Piccolantonio worked as an attorney prior to entering public service. She served as Chief Ombudsman for the state workers' compensation system for over a decade and spent two decades holding varying roles with the Industrial Commission of Ohio.

Prior to her service in the Statehouse, Piccolantonio was a member of the Gahanna-Jefferson School Board. She was first elected in 2016, and served as Board President for her entire eight year tenure on the board.

== Personal life ==
A lifelong Ohioan, Piccolantonio currently resides in Gahanna with her husband and three sons.
