= Dani Isaacsohn =

American politician & businessman (born 1988)

- Isaacsohn in 2026

Minority Leader of the Ohio House of Representatives
- Incumbent
- Assumed office June 24, 2025
- Preceded by: Allison Russo

Member of the Ohio House of Representatives from the 24th district
- Incumbent
- Assumed office January 2, 2023
- Preceded by: Allison Russo

Personal details
- Born: Dani Zachary Isaacsohn; November 13, 1988 (age 38) Cincinnati, Ohio, U.S.
- Party: Democratic
- Education: Georgetown University (BS); Yale University (JD); University of Cambridge (MPhil)

Dani Zachary Isaacsohn (born November 13, 1988) is an American politician and businessman currently serving as the Minority Leader of the Ohio House of Representatives. A Democrat, Isaacsohn represents the 24th district, which encompasses eastern portions of the city of Cincinnati. Elected in November 2022, Isaacsohn assumed office on January 1, 2023.

== Early life and education ==
A native of Cincinnati, Isaacsohn grew up in a Jewish family and graduated from Walnut Hills High School in 2007. He earned a Bachelor of Science degree in foreign relations from the Walsh School of Foreign Service at Georgetown University, a Juris Doctor from Yale University, and a Master of Philosophy in politics from the University of Cambridge.

== Career ==
Isaacsohn began his career as a field organizer for the Barack Obama 2008 presidential campaign. In 2014, he worked as a legal intern in the Office of White House Counsel. In 2013 and 2014, he worked as the deputy campaigns and political director of Battleground Texas. He was also a summer associate at Debevoise & Plimpton. In 2016, Isaacsohn was the deputy get-out-the-vote director of the Democratic Party of Virginia and Hillary Clinton 2016 presidential campaign. From 2017 to 2019, he was a senior advisor at 17a, a public service strategy organization based in Cincinnati. In 2017, he founded Cohear, a consulting firm.

== Ohio House of Representatives ==
Isaacsohn was elected to the Ohio House of Representatives in 2022, defeating former State Representative Dale Mallory in the Democratic primary and Republican nominee Adam Koehler in the general election. He was re-elected in 2024 and selected as Democratic Whip following the resignation of Jessica Miranda.

On June 5, 2025, Minority Leader Allison Russo announced her intentions to step down from her position within House Democratic leadership. Isaacsohn was subsequently elected to succeed Russo, and was sworn in as Minority Leader on June 24, 2025. He is the first Cincinnati-based politician to serve as Minority Leader in over 50 years.

During his tenure, Isaacsohn helped to establish the Ohio Jewish Caucus, which includes five other state members of the 136th General Assembly. He serves as the ranking member of the House Judiciary Committee, and also sits on the Finance and Energy Committees.

Ohio House of Representatives
Preceded by Allison Russo	Minority Leader of the Ohio House of Representatives; 2025–present	Incumbent
