= Ohio's 22nd House of Representatives district =

American legislative district

Ohio's 22nd State House of Representatives district
Representative
Juanita Brent; D–Cleveland
- Population (2020): 125,144

Ohio's 22nd House of Representatives district is currently represented by Democrat Juanita Brent. It is located entirely within Cuyahoga County and includes the municipalities of Cleveland Heights, East Cleveland, Highland Hills, North Randall, Shaker Heights, University Heights, Warrensville Heights, and part of Cleveland.

== List of members representing the district ==
Member	Party	Years	General Assembly	Electoral history
District established January 2, 1967.
Vern Riffe (New Boston)	Democratic	January 2, 1967 – December 31, 1972	107th 108th 109th	Elected in 1966. Re-elected in 1968. Re-elected in 1970. Redistricted to the 89th district.
Chester Cruze (Cincinnati)	Republican	January 1, 1973 – April 6, 1977	110th 111th 112th	Redistricted from the 68th district and re-elected in 1972. Re-elected in 1974. Re-elected in 1976. Resigned.
Vacant		April 6, 1977 – April 27, 1977	112th	
Edith Mayer (Cincinnati)	Republican	April 27, 1977 – December 31, 1982	112th 113th 114th	Appointed to finish Cruze's term. Re-elected in 1978. Re-elected in 1980. Redistricted to the 27th district and lost re-nomination.
Lou Blessing (Cincinnati)	Republican	January 3, 1983 – December 31, 1992	115th 116th 117th 118th 119th	Elected in 1982. Re-elected in 1984. Re-elected in 1986. Re-elected in 1988. Re-elected in 1990. Redistricted to the 35th district.
Ray Miller (Columbus)	Democratic	January 4, 1993 – July 1, 1993	120th	Redistricted from the 29th district and re-elected in 1992. Resigned.
Charleta Tavares (Columbus)	Democratic	July 1, 1993 – December 31, 1998	120th 121st 122nd	Appointed to finish Miller's term. Re-elected in 1994. Re-elected in 1996. Retired to run for Ohio Secretary of State.
Ray Miller (Columbus)	Democratic	January 4, 1999 – December 31, 2002	123rd 124th	Elected in 1998. Re-elected in 2000. Retired to run for state senator.
Jim Hughes (Columbus)	Republican	January 6, 2003 – December 31, 2008	125th 126th 127th	Redistricted from the 27th district and re-elected in 2002. Re-elected in 2004. Re-elected in 2006. Term-limited; ran for state senator.
John Patrick Carney (Columbus)	Democratic	January 5, 2009 – December 31, 2014	128th 129th 130th	Elected in 2008. Re-elected in 2010. Re-elected in 2012. Retired to run for Ohio State Auditor.
David J. Leland (Columbus)	Democratic	January 5, 2015 – December 31, 2022	131st 132nd 133rd 134th	Elected in 2014. Re-elected in 2016. Re-elected in 2018. Re-elected in 2020. Term-limited.
Juanita Brent (Cleveland)	Democratic	January 2, 2023 – present	135th	Redistricted from the 12th district and re-elected in 2022.
