= Veronica Sims =

American politician

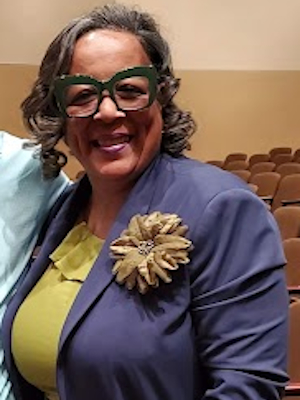
- Veronica Sims in 2024

Member of the Ohio House of Representatives from the 33rd district
- Incumbent
- Assumed office February 7, 2024
- Preceded by: Tavia Galonski

Member of the Akron Public Schools School Board from the at-large district
- In office 2013–2016

Personal details
- Party: Democratic
- Education: University of Akron

Veronica Sims is an American politician and non-profit administrator serving as a member of the Ohio House of Representatives from the 33rd district since 2024. She was appointed to replace Tavia Galonski, who resigned from office. She previously served as a member of the Akron Public Schools school board from the at-large district and as the president of the Summit County Council.

== Early life and career ==
A lifelong resident of Akron, Sims earned a B.S degree. in political science and criminal justice and a Master's degree in Public Administration from the University of Akron. She worked as the special projects and government affairs administrator for Akron Summit Community Action Inc.

=== Political career ===
Sims was elected to the Akron Public Schools school board in 2013 with 15.8% of the vote, finishing in third place. She also served on Akron City Council, and Summit County Council, where she served as president. Sims was appointed to the Ohio House in February 2024 to fill the vacancy created by the resignation of Tavia Galonski and was elected to a full term later that year.

=== Committee assignments ===
As of June 2026, Sims serves on the following committees in the Ohio House.

- Local Government (ranking member)
- Agriculture
- Finance
- Government Oversight
