= Haraz Ghanbari =

American politician from Ohio

Haraz N. Ghanbari
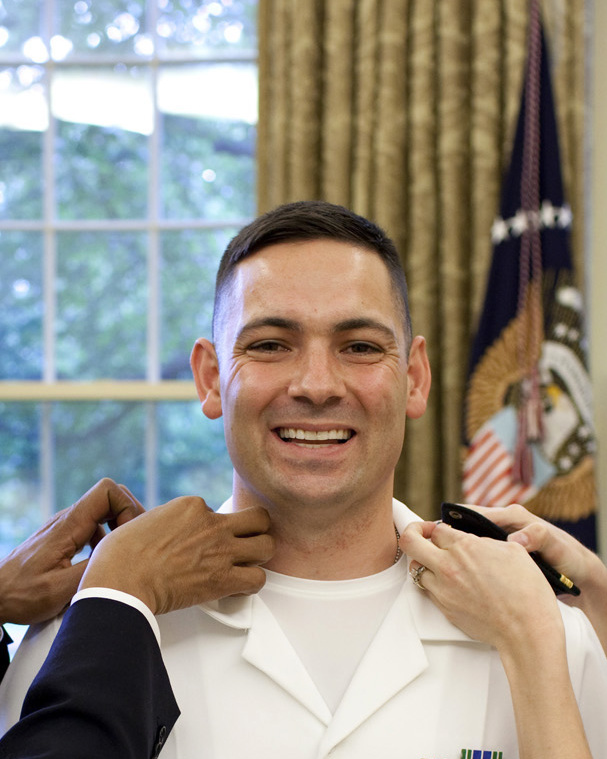

Member of the Ohio House of Representatives from the 75th district
- Incumbent
- Assumed office January 3, 2023
- Preceded by: Gail Pavliga

Member of the Ohio House of Representatives from the 3rd district
- In office March 27, 2019 – December 31, 2022
- Preceded by: Theresa Gavarone

Personal details
- Party: Republican
- Spouse: Kim
- Children: 2
- Education: Kent State
- Profession: Public affairs

Haraz N. Ghanbari is an American Republican member of the Ohio House of Representatives, representing the 75th district. Having previously sought appointment in 2016, he was successfully appointed to the post in March 2019 to replace Theresa Gavarone, who was appointed state senator for the 2nd District of the Ohio Senate.

Ghanbari had served on the city council of Perrysburg, Ohio, since 2016, and was intending to run for re-election to the council when he was appointed to the House of Representatives. He had previously worked as the director of military and veterans affairs at the University of Toledo. He also served in the US Army as a public affairs officer. Ghanbari has served over 17 years in the Army National Guard and the United States Navy Reserve, being promoted to lieutenant commander on September 1, 2018. He was selected to the rank of Commander on 23 Jun 2025. His service has included deployment to Bosnia in the Army and Afghanistan with the Navy. He has also worked for the Associated Press in its Washington bureau as a photojournalist. Ghanbari is married and has two children.

== Committee assignments ==
As of June 2026, Ghanbari serves on the following committees in the Ohio House.

- Small Business (chair)
- Arts, Athletics, and Tourism
- Public Safety
- Veterans and Military Development

Political offices
Preceded by Theresa Gavarone	Ohio House of Representatives, 75th district 2019–present	Incumbent
