= Allison Russo =

American politician from Ohio (born 1976)

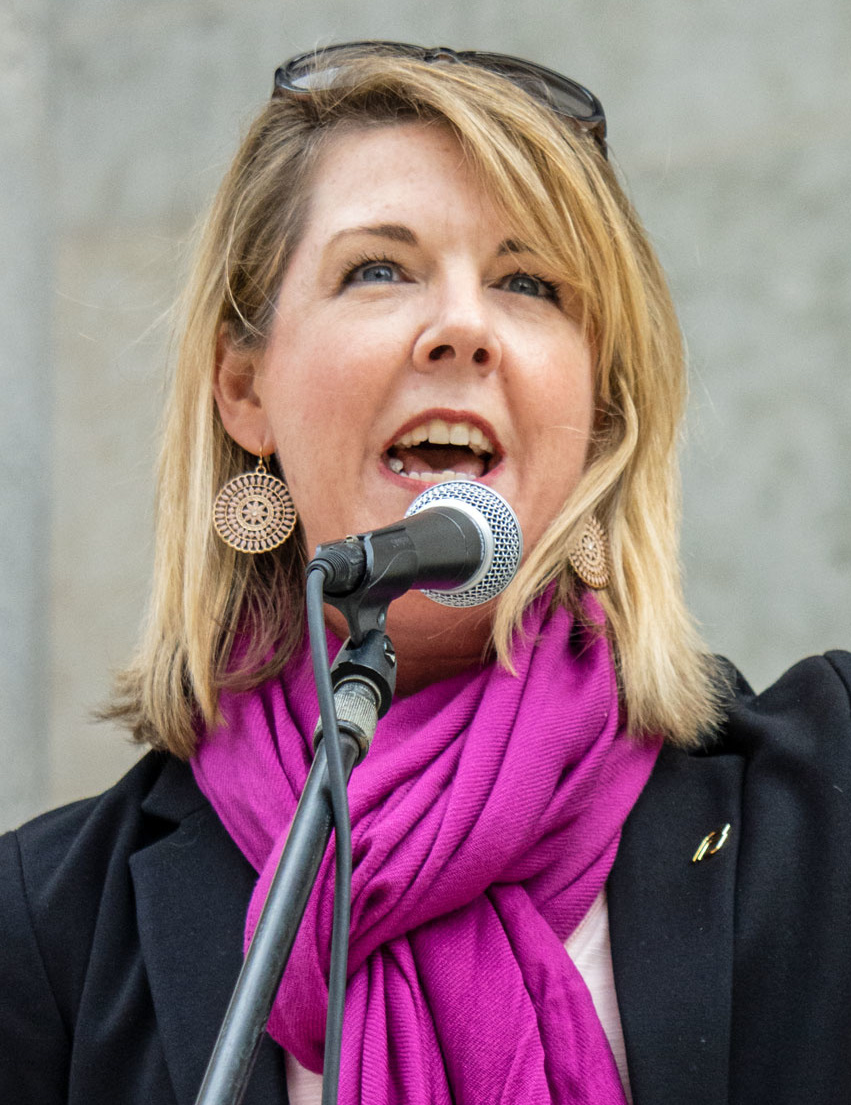
- Russo in 2021

Secretary of State-elect of Ohio
- Assuming office January 11, 2027
- Governor: Amy Acton (elect)
- Succeeding: Frank LaRose

Minority Leader of the Ohio House of Representatives
- In office January 26, 2022 – June 24, 2025
- Preceded by: Kristin Boggs (acting)
- Succeeded by: Dani Isaacsohn

Member of the Ohio House of Representatives
- Incumbent
- Assumed office January 1, 2023
- Preceded by: Tom Patton
- Constituency: 7th district
- In office January 7, 2019 – December 31, 2022
- Preceded by: Jim Hughes
- Succeeded by: Dani Isaacsohn
- Constituency: 24th district

Personal details
- Born: Catherine Allison Davis; October 15, 1976 (age 50) Mississippi, U.S.
- Party: Democratic
- Spouse: Brian Russo (m. 2000)
- Children: 3
- Education: Mississippi University for Women (BS); University of Alabama, Birmingham (MPH); George Washington University (DPH)
- Website: Campaign website

Catherine Allison Russo (née Davis; born October 15, 1976) is an American politician who is currently the Secretary of State-elect of Ohio. A member of the Democratic Party, Russo has served as a member of the Ohio House of Representatives since 2019. She represents the 7th district, which consists of portions of Columbus, and Upper Arlington in Franklin County. Russo formerly served as Ohio House Minority Leader from January 2022 to June 2025. Russo also served on the Ohio Redistricting Commission.

== Early life and education ==
Russo was born Catherine Allison Davis to a single mother who had recently graduated high school in Mississippi.

Russo holds a bachelor of science degree from the Mississippi University for Women, a master's degree in public health epidemiology from the University of Alabama at Birmingham, and a doctoral degree in health policy from George Washington University.

== 2026 Ohio Secretary of State campaign ==
In August 2025, Russo announced that she would run for Ohio Secretary of State in 2026. In February 2026, she filed her campaign petition with signatures collected from voters in 71 Ohio counties.

Russo ran on a platform that emphasized protecting voting rights in Ohio and serving as a guardrail against federal government overreach into Ohio’s election process. She had repeatedly spoken out against the current Secretary of State, Frank LaRose’s, decision to share Ohio’s non-public voter information with the federal Department of Justice, and had emphasized data privacy. She had stated that she was running to be an advocate for voters that focused on ensuring that all eligible voters have the information they need to cast their vote.

Russo had also stated that restoring trust and transparency to the elections process was a priority. She planned to do so by conducting the office in a transparent and non-partisan manner that she believed would restore public trust in the elections process. She had stated that she would do so by ensuring local elections officials have the resources they need to conduct elections, making clear all of the checks and balances in the current elections process, and also ensuring that the ballot language for ballot issues is accurate and unbiased for all issues.

== Leadership of House Democrats ==
State Representative Allison Russo served as Minority Leader of the Ohio House of Representatives during a period in which Republicans held a supermajority in the chamber.

=== Electoral outcomes during leadership tenure ===
Russo served as House Minority Leader during the 2022 and 2024 Ohio House election cycles. In the 2022 elections, Republicans maintained a 67–32 majority in the Ohio House after a federal three-judge panel ordered the state to use a previously invalidated legislative map for the election.

Following the adoption of new legislative maps in October 2023, the 2024 elections resulted in a 65–34 Republican majority in the Ohio House.

=== Election performance and party criticism ===
During Allison Russo’s tenure as House Minority Leader, Ohio Democrats continued to face challenges in expanding their legislative representation. Following the 2024 election cycle, Republicans maintained and expanded their majority in the Ohio House, while Democrats did not achieve significant gains.

Post-election analysis and commentary highlighted ongoing concerns about Democratic campaign strategy and performance. In an opinion column for Cleveland.com, Thomas Suddes wrote that the party faced “a harsh new reality” following electoral losses and pointed to earlier strategic missteps. Additional commentary in The Cincinnati Enquirer described broader challenges for Ohio Democrats, including difficulties maintaining voter engagement and rebuilding competitiveness.

Analysts and advocacy groups have also pointed to structural factors affecting Democratic performance, including Ohio’s legislative district maps and partisan advantages in redistricting.

=== Opposition to constitutional amendment threshold change ===
During Russo’s tenure as House Minority Leader, House Democrats opposed a Republican-led effort to raise the threshold for approving constitutional amendments in Ohio from a simple majority to 60 percent. The measure was placed on the ballot during a special election held in August 2023. Ohio voters rejected the proposal.

=== Coalition supporting Jason Stephens speakership ===
In 2023, during her tenure as House Minority Leader, Russo was among House Democrats who supported Republican Jason Stephens in his successful bid to become Speaker of the Ohio House for the two-year biennium. The outcome drew opposition from some members of the House Republican caucus.

=== Leadership change in 2025 ===
On June 5, 2025, Russo announced that she would step down as House Minority Leader, stating that the caucus needed “ample time to prepare for the 2026 election cycle.” She stepped down later that month and continued serving as a member of the Ohio House. Representative Dani Isaacsohn was subsequently elected by the Democratic caucus to succeed her.

== Career ==
Outside of public office, Russo has worked in health policy consulting. She has served as a research director at Kennell and Associates, Inc. Her employment with the firm began in 2010 and has continued alongside her service in the Ohio House of Representatives.

== Controversies and criticism ==
=== Ohio Redistricting Commission ===
In September 2023, the Ohio Redistricting Commission unanimously approved new Ohio House and Senate maps during a late-night session, with House Minority Leader Allison Russo and Senate Minority Leader Nickie Antonio joining Republican members in support.

In subsequent litigation, the Supreme Court of Ohio dismissed pending challenges to the September 2023 maps, allowing them to remain in effect.

During her 2026 campaign for Ohio Secretary of State, Russo's vote for the 2023 maps drew criticism from some voting-rights advocates and Democratic activists. The criticism focused on her support for a plan backed by Republican members of the commission. In an interview with Signal Ohio, Russo defended her vote as "the best of two bad options", arguing that the map she negotiated has given Democrats a pathway to break the Republican Supermajority in 2026. Had she voted no, the Ohio State Legislature would have redrawn the state legislative maps in 2025.

=== Lawsuit by former caucus employee ===
In January 2025, a former attorney for the Ohio House Democratic Caucus filed a federal lawsuit alleging gender discrimination and retaliation related to her employment. Russo was serving as House Minority Leader at the time the lawsuit was filed.

=== Legislative discipline of Eliot Forhan and related litigation ===
In November 2023, House Democratic leadership circulated a 19-page memorandum documenting allegations of abusive and threatening behavior by Northeast Ohio state Representative Elliot Forhan. The memorandum summarized complaints raised by colleagues, constituents, and community organizations and outlined disciplinary actions that resulted in Forhan being stripped of nearly all lawmaker privileges and removed from the House Democratic caucus. House leadership also requested that Forhan complete bias training and mediation efforts prior to his removal. That same month, Representative Juanita Brent filed a civil protection order against Forhan, citing concerns of stalking and intimidation.

In November 2024, Forhan filed a civil defamation lawsuit in Franklin County Common Pleas Court against multiple Ohio Statehouse leaders, including members of House Democratic leadership. The complaint alleged that false statements were made to law enforcement and others in connection with the internal investigation that led to his removal from the caucus. Forhan denied the underlying allegations and asserted that the actions taken against him were defamatory and damaging to his reputation. The lawsuit sought monetary damages and injunctive relief.

In September 2025, a judge dismissed most of Forhan’s claims, ruling that the majority of the alleged conduct constituted protected political activity or otherwise failed to meet the legal standard for defamation. The court allowed limited portions of the case to proceed, narrowing the scope of the lawsuit.

In July 2025, Forhan filed a public-records lawsuit against the Ohio House of Representatives in the Ohio Court of Claims, challenging the House’s response to public-records requests made under the Ohio Public Records Act. The requests sought internal investigative materials related to two investigations conducted during his tenure in office. While the House produced certain responsive documents, it withheld draft investigative reports prepared by outside counsel and other materials.

In October 2025, the Court of Claims adopted a report and recommendation from a special master, concluding that the withheld draft reports constituted public records under Ohio law and ordering their production, along with reimbursement of certain costs. The court declined to require disclosure of investigators’ witness interview documentation, finding that those materials did not qualify as public records. Both Forhan and the Ohio House appealed portions of the decision to the Tenth District Court of Appeals; as of early 2026, a hearing date had not been scheduled.

== Ohio House of Representatives ==
=== Election ===
Russo faced off against Republican candidate Erik Yassenoff in the general election on November 6, 2018, winning with 57 percent of the vote, flipping the seat from Republican control to Democratic control. In 2020, she successfully defended her seat against Republican Pat Manley, winning with 58% of the vote. After being redrawn into the 7th district, Russo was again re-elected to the Ohio House in 2022 and 2024, running uncontested in both elections.

=== Campaign finance ===
According to filings with the Ohio Secretary of State, Allison Russo’s campaign committee, Citizens to Elect Allison Russo, received contributions from labor organizations, political action committees (PACs), and individual donors.

During the 2018 election cycle, filings show contributions from labor-affiliated and advocacy PACs, including the Ohio Federation of Teachers Political Contributing Entity ($12,000), the American Federation of State, County and Municipal Employees (AFSCME) Ohio Council 8 ($4,000), AFSCME Ohio PCE ($12,707.79), OCSEA/AFSCME Local 11 ($2,500), and the United Food and Commercial Workers Active Ballot Club ($5,000). Additional contributions included EMILY’s List ($5,000), The Matriots (multiple contributions totaling $9,500), Only If You Run ($2,500), and the Ohio Association for Justice PAC ($1,000).

Filings from 2019 show contributions from both individual donors and PACs. Individual contributions were typically in smaller amounts, often ranging from $5 to $250, with some donors contributing multiple times throughout the year.

The campaign also reported contributions from PACs including Cardinal Health Inc. PAC ($1,000), CVS Health PAC ($500), the Columbus Medical Association PAC ($1,000), and the Beer & Wine PAC (multiple contributions totaling $1,200). Additional contributions were reported from professional PACs such as Bricker & Eckler LLP PAC.

All contributions are publicly reported through the Ohio Secretary of State’s campaign finance database.

=== Committees ===
Russo serves on the following committees:

- Health
- State and Local Government
- Finance
- Finance Subcommittee on Health and Human Services
- Families, Aging Human Services

== 2021 congressional campaign ==
In May 2021, Republican Representative Steve Stivers resigned from Congress to become CEO of the Ohio Chamber of Commerce, triggering a special election for the vacant seat. Russo won the Democratic primary in August against Greg Betts, and advanced to the general election against Republican lobbyist Mike Carey. The election was held on November 2, 2021, with Carey defeating Russo by a margin of 58.3 percent to 41.7 percent. Despite the loss, Russo received the highest vote share for a Democrat in the district since it was redrawn in 2012.

== Personal life ==
In 2000, Russo married Brian Russo, a United States Air Force veteran. They have three children together.

== Electoral history ==
Ohio House 24th district
Year	Democrat	Votes	Pct	Republican	Votes	Pct
2018	Allison Russo	34,629	57.0%	Erik F. Yassenoff	26,159	43.0%
2020	Allison Russo	42,935	58.0%	Pat Manley	31,202	42.0%

2021 Ohio's 15th congressional district Democratic primary
Party	Candidate	Votes	%
Democratic	Allison Russo	13,057	84.2%
Democratic	Greg Betts	2,453	15.8%
Total votes		15,510	100.0

2021 Ohio's 15th congressional district special election
Party	Candidate	Votes	%
Republican	Mike Carey	93,255	58.3
Democratic	Allison Russo	66,757	41.7
Total votes		160,012	100.0

Ohio House 7th district
Year	Democrat	Votes	Pct	Republican	Votes	Pct
2022	Allison Russo	35,337	100%			
2024	Allison Russo	44,243	99.9%			

2026 Ohio Secretary of State Election Democratic primary
Party	Candidate	Votes	%
Democratic	Allison Russo	487,313	67.4%
Democratic	Bryan Hambley	235,668	32.6%
Total votes		722,981	100.0

2026 Ohio Secretary of State Election
Party	Candidate	Votes	%
Democratic	Allison Russo		
Republican	Robert Sprague		
Libertarian	Tom Pruss		
Total votes			100.0

Ohio House of Representatives
Preceded by Kristin Boggs; Acting	Minority Leader of the Ohio House of Representatives; 2022–2025	Succeeded by Dani Isaacsohn
Party political offices
Preceded by Chelsea Clark	Democratic nominee for Ohio Secretary of State; 2026	Most recent
Political offices
Preceded by Frank LaRose	Secretary of State of Ohio; Taking office 2027	Elect
