= Ohio House of Representatives =

Lower house of the Ohio General Assembly

- 136th Ohio General Assembly

Type
- Type: Lower House
- Term limits: 4 terms (8 years total)

History
- New session started: January 3, 2023

Leadership
- Speaker: Matt Huffman (R) since January 6, 2025
- Speaker pro tempore: Gayle Manning (R) since January 6, 2025
- Majority Leader: Marilyn John (R) since January 6, 2025
- Minority Leader: Dani Isaacsohn (D) since June 24, 2025

Structure
- Seats: 99
- Political groups: Majority: Republican (65); Minority: Democratic (34)
- Length of term: 2 years
- Authority: Article II, Ohio Constitution
- Salary: $68,674/year

Elections
- Last election: November 3, 2026 (99 seats)
- Next election: November 3, 2028 (99 seats)
- Redistricting: Ohio Redistricting Commission

Meeting place
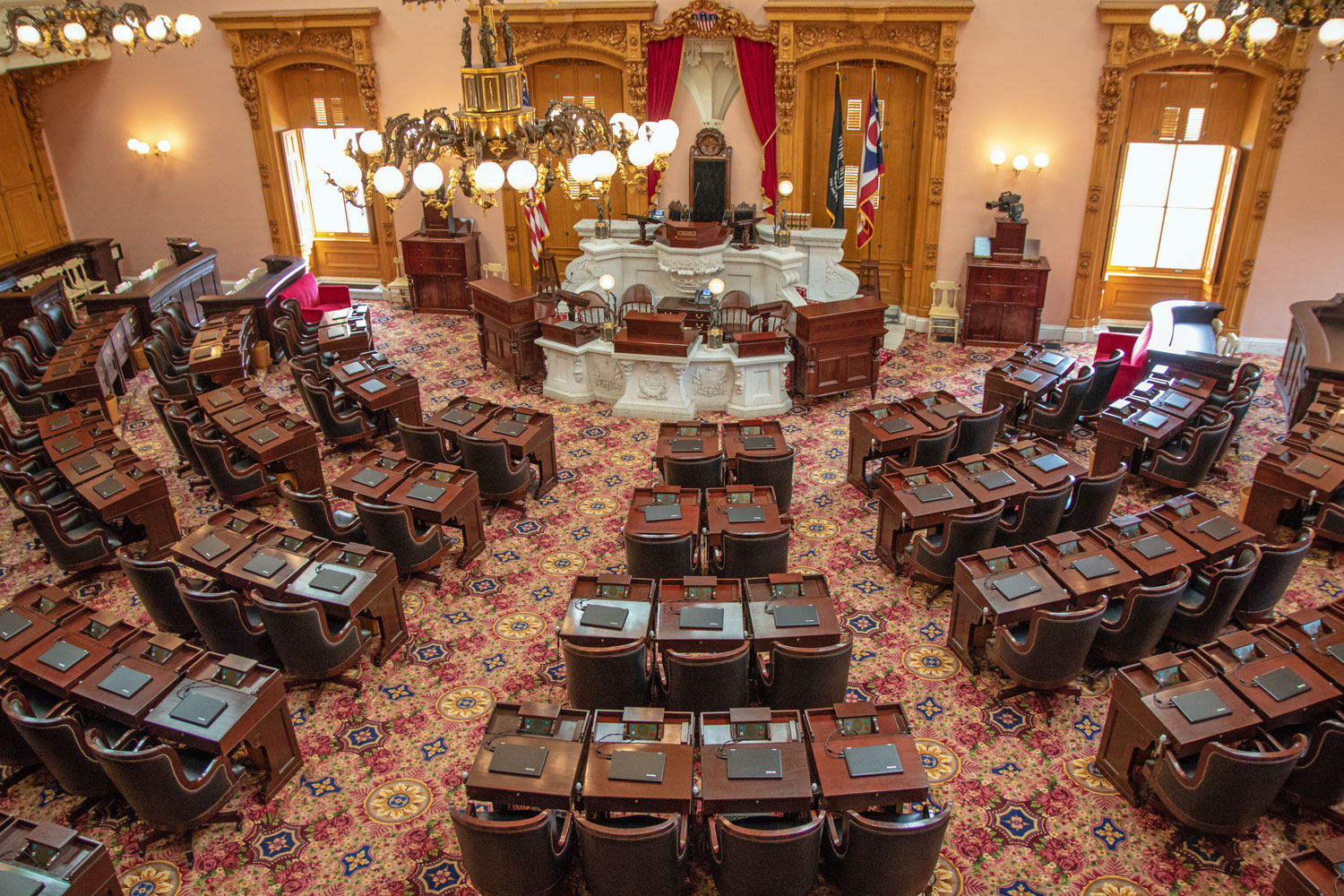
- House of Representatives Chamber; Ohio Statehouse; Columbus, Ohio

Website
- Ohio House of Representatives

The Ohio House of Representatives is the lower house of the Ohio General Assembly, the state legislature of the U.S. state of Ohio; the other house of the bicameral legislature being the Ohio Senate.

The House of Representatives first met in Chillicothe on March 3, 1803, under the later superseded state constitution of that year. In 1816, the capital was moved to Columbus, where it is located today.

Members are limited to four successive two-year elected terms (terms are considered successive if they are separated by less than four years). Time served by appointment to fill out another representative's uncompleted term does not count against the term limit. There are 99 members in the house, elected from single-member districts. Every even-numbered year, all the seats are up for re-election.

== Composition ==
	Party (Shading indicates majority caucus)		Total	Vacant
	Democratic	Republican	Total	Vacant
End of previous Assembly	32	67	99	0
Begin 2025 Session	34	65	99	0
Latest voting share	34%	66%		

=== Leadership ===
Presiding Officers
Speaker of the House	Matt Huffman
Speaker Pro Tempore	Gayle Manning
Assistant Speaker Pro Tempore	Phil Plummer
Majority Leadership
Majority Floor Leader	Marilyn John
Assistant Majority Floor Leader	Adam Bird
Majority Whip	Riordan McClain, Steve Demetriou, Nick Santucci, Josh Williams
Minority Leadership
Minority Leader	Dani Isaacsohn
Assistant Minority Leader	Phil Robinson
Minority Whip	Beryl Piccolantonio
Assistant Minority Whip	Desiree Tims

=== Members of the 136th House of Representatives ===
House districts by party: Democratic Republican

District	Representative	Party	Residence	Counties represented	First elected	Term limited
1	Dontavius Jarrells	Democratic	Columbus	Franklin (part)	2020	2028
2	Latyna Humphrey	Democratic	Columbus	Franklin (part)	2021↑	2030
3	Ismail Mohamed	Democratic	Columbus	Franklin (part)	2022	2030
4	Beryl Piccolantonio	Democratic	Gahanna	Franklin (part)	2024↑	2032
5	Meredith Lawson-Rowe	Democratic	Reynoldsburg	Franklin (part)	2024	2032
6	Christine Cockley	Democratic	Columbus	Franklin (part)	2024	2032
7	Allison Russo	Democratic	Upper Arlington	Franklin (part)	2018	2026
8	Anita Somani	Democratic	Dublin	Franklin (part)	2022	2030
9	Munira Abdullahi	Democratic	Columbus	Franklin (part)	2022	2030
10	Mark Sigrist	Democratic	Grove City	Franklin (part)	2024	2032
11	Crystal Lett	Democratic	Columbus	Franklin (part)	2024	2032
12	Brian Stewart	Republican	Ashville	Franklin (part); Pickaway; Madison	2020	2028
13	Tristan Rader	Democratic	Lakewood	Cuyahoga (part)	2024	2032
14	Sean Brennan	Democratic	Parma	Cuyahoga (part)	2022	2030
15	Chris Glassburn	Democratic	North Olmsted	Cuyahoga (part)	2024	2032
16	Bride Rose Sweeney	Democratic	Cleveland	Cuyahoga (part)	2018	2026
17	Mike Dovilla	Republican	Berea	Cuyahoga (part)	2024	2032
18	Juanita Brent	Democratic	Cleveland	Cuyahoga (part)	2018	2026
19	Phil Robinson	Democratic	Solon	Cuyahoga (part)	2018	2026
20	Terrence Upchurch	Democratic	Cleveland	Cuyahoga (part)	2018	2026
21	Eric Synenberg	Democratic	Beachwood	Cuyahoga (part)	2024	2032
22	Darnell Brewer	Democratic	Cleveland	Cuyahoga (part)	2022	2030
23	Daniel Troy	Democratic	Willowick	Lake (part)	2020	2028
24	Dani Isaacsohn	Democratic	Cincinnati	Hamilton (part)	2022	2030
25	Cecil Thomas	Democratic	Cincinnati	Hamilton (part)	2022	2030
26	Ashley Bryant Bailey	Democratic	Cincinnati	Hamilton (part)	2025↑	2034
27	Rachel Baker	Democratic	Cincinnati	Hamilton (part)	2022	2030
28	Karen Brownlee	Democratic	Symmes Township	Hamilton (part)	2024	2032
29	Cindy Abrams	Republican	Harrison	Hamilton (part)	2019↑	2028
30	Mike Odioso	Republican	Green Township	Hamilton (part)	2024	2032
31	Bill Roemer	Republican	Richfield	Stark (part); Summit (part)	2018	2026
32	Jack Daniels	Republican	New Franklin	Summit (part)	2024↑	2032
33	Veronica Sims	Democratic	Akron	Summit (part)	2024↑	2032
34	Derrick Hall	Democratic	Akron	Summit (part)	2024	2032
35	Steve Demetriou	Republican	Chagrin Falls	Cuyahoga (part)	2022	2030
36	Andrea White	Republican	Kettering	Montgomery (part)	2020	2028
37	Tom Young	Republican	Miamisburg	Montgomery (part)	2020	2028
38	Desiree Tims	Democratic	Dayton	Montgomery (part)	2024	2032
39	Phil Plummer	Republican	Dayton	Montgomery (part)	2018	2026
40	Rodney Creech	Republican	West Alexandria	Montgomery; Preble (part)	2020	2028
41	Erika White	Democratic	Springfield Township	Lucas (part)	2024	2032
42	Elgin Rogers Jr.	Democratic	Toledo	Lucas (part)	2022↑	2030
43	Michele Grim	Democratic	Toledo	Lucas (part)	2022	2030
44	Josh Williams	Republican	Sylvania Township	Lucas (part)	2022	2030
45	Jennifer Gross	Republican	West Chester	Butler (part)	2020	2028
46	Thomas Hall	Republican	Madison Township	Butler (part)	2020	2028
47	Diane Mullins	Republican	Hamilton	Butler (part)	2024	2032
48	Scott Oelslager	Republican	North Canton	Stark (part)	2018	2026
49	Jim Thomas	Republican	Canton	Stark (part)	2022	2030
50	Matthew Kishman	Republican	Minerva	Stark (part)	2024	2032
51	Jodi Salvo	Republican	Bolivar	Tuscarawas (part)	2024	2032
52	Gayle Manning	Republican	North Ridgeville	Lorain (part)	2018	2026
53	Joe Miller	Democratic	Amherst	Lorain (part)	2018	2026
54	Kellie Deeter	Republican	Norwalk	Huron; Lorain (part)	2024	2032
55	Michelle Teska	Republican	Clearcreek Township	Warren (part)	2024	2032
56	Adam Mathews	Republican	Lebanon	Warren (part)	2022	2030
57	Jamie Callender	Republican	Concord Township	Lake (part)	2018	2026
58	Lauren McNally	Democratic	Youngstown	Mahoning (part)	2022	2030
59	Tex Fischer	Republican	Boardman	Mahoning (part)	2024↑	2032
60	Brian Lorenz	Republican	Powell	Delaware (part)	2023↑	2032
61	Beth Lear	Republican	Galena	Delaware (part)	2022	2030
62	Jean Schmidt	Republican	Loveland	Clermont (part)	2020	2028
63	Adam Bird	Republican	New Richmond	Brown; Clermont (part)	2020	2028
64	Nick Santucci	Republican	Howland Township	Trumbull (part)	2022	2030
65	David Thomas	Republican	Jefferson	Ashtabula (part)	2024	2032
66	Sean Hutson	Republican	Wadsworth	Medina (part)	2026↑	2034
67	Melanie Miller	Republican	Ashland	Ashland (part); Mediana (part)	2022	2030
68	Thaddeus Claggett	Republican	Newark	Licking (part)	2022	2030
69	Kevin Miller	Republican	Newark	Coshocton; Licking (part); Perry	2021↑	2030
70	Brian Lampton	Republican	Beavercreek	Greene (part)	2020	2028
71	Levi Dean	Republican	Xenia	Clark (part); Greene (part); Madison	2024	2032
72	Heidi Workman	Republican	Rootstown	Portage (part)	2024	2032
73	Jeff LaRe	Republican	Violet Township	Fairfield (part)	2019↑	2028
74	Bernard Willis	Republican	Springfield	Clark (part)	2022	2030
75	Haraz Ghanbari	Republican	Perrysburg	Wood (part)	2019↑	2028
76	Marilyn John	Republican	Shelby	Richland (part)	2020	2028
77	Meredith Craig	Republican	Wayne Township	Wayne (part)	2024	2032
78	Matt Huffman	Republican	Lima	Auglaize (part); Darke (part); Mercer; Shelby (part)	2024	2032
79	Monica Robb Blasdel	Republican	German Township	Carroll; Columbiana (part)	2022	2030
80	Johnathan Newman	Republican	Troy	Darke (part); Miami	2024	2032
81	James Hoops	Republican	Napoleon	Fulton (part); Henry; Putnam; Williams	2018	2026
82	Roy Klopfenstein	Republican	Haviland	Paulding	2022	2030
83	Ty Mathews	Republican	Findlay	Hancock; Hardin; Logan (part)	2024	2032
84	Angela King	Republican	Celina	Mercer (part)	2022	2030
85	Tim Barhorst	Republican	Fort Loramie	Champaign; Logan (part); Shelby (part)	2022	2030
86	Tracy Richardson	Republican	Marysville	Marion (part); Union	2018	2026
87	Riordan McClain	Republican	Upper Sandusky	Crawford; Marion (part); Morrow; Seneca (part); Wyandot	2018↑	2026
88	Gary Click	Republican	Fremont	Sandusky; Seneca (part)	2020	2028
89	Caleb Stidham	Republican	Sandusky	Erie; Ottawa	2026↑	2034
90	Justin Pizzulli	Republican	Franklin Furnace	Adams; Lawrence (part); Scioto	2023↑	2032
91	Bob Peterson	Republican	Washington Court House	Highland; Pike; Fayette; Ross (part)	2022	2030
92	Mark Johnson	Republican	Chillicothe	Fayette; Pickaway (part); Ross (part)	2020	2028
93	Jason Stephens	Republican	Kitts Hill	Gallia; Jackson (part); Lawrence (part); Vinton (part)	2019↑	2028
94	Kevin Ritter	Republican	Marietta	Athens (part); Meigs; Vinton (part); Washington (part)	2024	2032
95	Ty Moore	Republican	Caldwell	Belmont (part); Carroll; Harrison; Noble, Washington (part)	2025↑	2034
96	Ron Ferguson	Republican	Wintersville	Belmont (part); Jefferson; Monroe	2020	2028
97	Adam Holmes	Republican	Nashport	Guernsey; Muskingum (part)	2019↑	2028
98	Mark Hiner	Republican	Loudonville	Holmes (part); Tuscarawas	2024	2032
99	Sarah Fowler Arthur	Republican	Geneva	Ashtabula (part); Geauga (part)	2020	2028

↑: Member was originally appointed to the seat.

== Officials ==
=== Speaker of the House ===
The Speaker of the House of Representatives is the presiding officer of the House. The duties of the Speaker include preserving order and decorum at all times, recognizing visitors in the galleries, controlling and providing security for the Hall, appointing members to perform the duties of the Speaker for a temporary period of time, naming committees and subcommittees and appointing their chairs and members, overseeing the performance of House employees, and signing bills, acts, resolutions, and more.

=== Clerk of the House ===
The Clerk of the House of Representatives is in charge of and regulates the distribution of records of the House. The Clerk is the custodian of legislative documents within the House. The duties of the Clerk include examining bills or resolutions before introduction, numbering bills and resolutions for filing, providing bills and documents pertaining to the bill to the chair of the corresponding committee, publishing calendars to notify the public about bills and resolutions, keeping a journal of House proceedings, superintending the presentation of bills and resolutions, and attesting writs and subpoenas issued by the House of Representatives.

=== Sergeant-at-Arms ===
The Sergeant-at-arms of the House of Representatives is tasked with maintaining security and order in the House. The Sergeant-at-arms may be ordered by the Speaker to clear the aisles if this is deemed necessary by the Speaker. Other duties of the Sergeant-at-arms include controlling admission to the building, serving subpoenas and warrants issued by the House, and bringing any members found to be absent without leave to the House.

== Standing Committees ==
The Speaker of the House is in charge of naming all committees. During the 136th General Assembly (2025–2026) the standing committees, chairs, vice chairs, and ranking members were:

Committee	Chair	Vice Chair	Ranking Member
Agriculture	Roy Klopfenstein	Johnathan Newman	Joe Miller
Arts, Athletics, and Tourism	Melanie Miller	Mark Hiner	Dontavius Jarrells
Children and Human Services	Andrea White	Jodi Salvo	Crystal Lett
Commerce and Labor	Mark Johnson	Beth Lear	Lauren McNally
Community Revitalization	Gary Click	Diane Mullins	Darnell Brewer
Development	James Hoops	Brian Lorenz	Munira Abdullahi
Education	Sarah Fowler Arthur	Mike Odioso	Phil Robinson
Energy	Adam Holmes	Adam Mathews	Chris Glassburn
Finance	Brian Stewart	Mike Dovilla	Bride Rose Sweeney
Financial Institutions	Scott Oelslager	Justin Pizzulli	Eric Synenberg
General Government	Sharon Ray	Jeff LaRe	Juanita Brent
Government Oversight	Thomas Hall	Ron Ferguson	Latyna Humphrey
Health	Jean Schmidt	Kellie Deeter	Anita Somani
Insurance	Brian Lampton	Meredith Craig	Desiree Tims
Judiciary	Jim Thomas	D.J. Swearingen	Dani Isaacsohn
Local Government	Angela King	Matthew Kishman	Veronica Sims
Medicaid	Jennifer Gross	Tim Barhorst	Rachel Baker
Natural Resources	Monica Robb Blasdel	Tex Fischer	Elgin Rogers Jr.
Public Insurance and Pensions	Bob Peterson	Michelle Teska	Sean Brennan
Public Safety	Cindy Abrams	Kevin Miller	Cecil Thomas
Rules and Reference	Matt Huffman	Gayle Manning	Allison Russo
Small Business	Haraz Ghanbari	Levi Dean	Terence Upchurch
Technology and Innovation	Thaddeus Claggett	Heidi Workman	Ismail Mohamed
Transportation	Bernard Willis	Jack Daniels	Michele Grim
Veterans and Military Development	Tracy Richardson	Ty Mathews	Derrick hall
Ways and Means	Bill Roemer	David Thomas	Daniel Troy
Workforce and Higher Education	Tom Young	Kevin Ritter	Beryl Piccolantonio
