= Slaby =

Slaby is a Slavic surname, meaning 'weak'. In Czech and Slovak, the surname is written Slabý (feminine: Slabá). In Polish, the surname is written Słaby. Notable people with the surname include:

- Adolf Slaby (1849–1913), German electronics pioneer
- Grit Slaby (born 1965), German swimmer
- John W. Slaby (1934–2017), American lawyer
- Lou Slaby (1941–2019), American football player
- Lynn Slaby (born 1938), American politician
- Marilyn Slaby (born 1939), American politician
- Michael Slaby, American entrepreneur
- Mieczysław Słaby (1905–1948), Polish army officer
- Tamira Slaby (born 1992), German Paralympic athlete
