= 2024 Ohio Issue 1 =

Citizen-led Redistricting Commission

- November 5, 2024
- Create a Citizen-led Redistricting Commission by Constitutional Amendment

Results
Choice	Votes	%
Yes	2,531,900	46.29%
No	2,937,489	53.71%
Valid votes	5,469,389	100.00%
Invalid or blank votes	0	0.00%
Total votes	5,469,389	100.00%

No
90–100%
80–90%
70–80%
60–70%
50–60%
Yes
90–100%
80–90%
70–80%
60–70%
50–60%
Other
Tie

The 2024 Ohio redistricting commission initiative was a citizen-initiated constitutional amendment, Issue 1 on the ballot, that was defeated 53.7% to 46.3% in the November 2024 election. If passed, the amendment would have replaced the existing politician-led Ohio Redistricting Commission with a 15-member commission of Ohio citizens selected from a pool by a panel of retired judges, to redraw congressional and legislative districts.

According to the petition, the official title was "An amendment to replace the current politician-run redistricting process with a citizen-led commission required to create fair state legislative and congressional districts through a more open and independent system." The proposed amendment would have set up a 15-member commission, narrowed from a larger pool by retired judges, to draw the district maps for Ohio statehouse and U.S. Congressional elections.

The proposed amendment was supported by a local coalition, Citizens Not Politicians, led by retired Republican chief justice Maureen O'Connor, locally supported by the League of Women Voters of Ohio and Common Cause Ohio, with support from the National Democratic Redistricting Committee. The proponents said that the law would end gerrymandering and "ban current or former politicians, political party officials and lobbyists from sitting on the Commission." Opponents argued it would create an unelected commission unaccountable to voters and was an attempt by Democrats to gain more seats in Congress and the statehouse.

Despite seeking to end gerrymandering, the certified ballot language noted that the amendment would "repeal constitutional protections against gerrymandering approved by nearly three-quarters of Ohio electors participating in the statewide elections of 2015 and 2018, and eliminate the longstanding ability of Ohio citizens to hold their representatives accountable for establishing fair state legislative and congressional districts." The ballot summary was written by the Ohio Ballot Board, anchored by Secretary of State Frank LaRose, and was opposed by the petitioners through a lawsuit, calling it "biased, inaccurate, [and] deceptive". It was only given a minor adjustment by the Ohio Supreme Court.

== Background ==
The ballot initiative was proposed in the context of longstanding disputes over redistricting in Ohio. Two earlier initiatives, supported by Republicans (Issue 4, 2005) or Democrats (Issue 2, 2012), had been defeated. In 2015, the Republican-majority legislature passed an initiative to create a politician-led Ohio Redistricting Commission, which was passed by the voters and would draw state legislative districts. In 2018, the legislature and voters passed another amendment extending the commission's powers to redraw congressional districts.

In 2021-2022, this Redistricting Commission drew new statehouse district maps, which were opposed by Democrats and rejected five times in 4-3 votes by the Ohio Supreme Court. The swing vote in these rulings was cast by Maureen O'Connor, a longtime Republican but critic of Donald Trump (January 12, February 7, March 16, April 14, 2022). As reported by the Associated Press, the state court eventually rejected two congressional maps and five sets of Statehouse maps as too disproportional. However, the second congressional map was not adjudicated until after the May 2022 primary, and a federal court intervened in the statehouse map to impose one of the maps rejected by the state court in time to hold a delayed August 2022 primary for the legislative districts, such that court-rejected maps were in effect for the November 2022 general election. In September 2023, the Ohio Redistricting Commission passed a new statehouse map by a 7-0 vote. Although this map was gerrymandered to approximately the same degree as the previous maps, because it had been passed with bipartisan support, in November 2023, the Ohio Supreme Court dismissed the three lawsuits filed against it. The lawsuits on the second Congressional map were withdrawn, as O'Connor's replacement on the Ohio Supreme Court was likely to vote with the three Republican justices who opposed the rejection of the earlier maps. The litigants believed that replacement maps might be more favorable to Republicans, in a reprise of the North Carolina congressional map dispute.

Issue 1 also emerged in the context of rising concern about elections, redistricting, and, more specifically, similar ballot initiative efforts in other states.

== Campaign ==
=== Signature gathering ===
As the 2022 Ohio elections were moving forward with district maps ruled unconstitutional by the state Supreme Court, by September 2022 plans for a new approach were being discussed by activists, including Common Cause Ohio and the League of Women Voters of Ohio. The campaign gained support from two retired Ohio Supreme Court justices, Maureen O'Connor and Yvette McGee-Brown, a Republican and a Democrat.

The Citizens Not Politicians campaign said that Issue 1 would: "Require fair and impartial districts by making it unconstitutional to draw voting districts that discriminate against or favor any political party or individual politician." They also avow that the amendment would "Require the commission to operate under an open and independent process."

After the Attorney General's approval of the ballot language, on July 1, 2024, the campaign submitted 731,000 signatures by voters in support of the ballot initiative. This number passed the hurdle of 10% (413,487) of the voters in the preceding gubernatorial election. This support included passing a 5% threshold of voters in 57 of Ohio's 88 counties.

=== Official arguments ===
On August 26, the Ballot Board released Issue 1 arguments and explanations:

The supporting argument stressed the shift of redistricting by politicians to citizens. It claimed that "Ohio is one of the most gerrymandered states in America," as evidenced by seven Supreme Court rulings that maps under the existing system were unconstitutional. It said that politicians and lobbyists would be banned from gerrymandering districts. It claimed that a "broad spectrum" of Ohioans, across party divisions, supported the initiative. In its explanation document for Issue 1, the Citizens Not Politicians campaign submitted 7 quotations from media, experts, and business leaders.

The opposing argument claimed that the amendment "forces gerrymandering" and would remove accountability to voters. It claimed that the proposed system would result in "political and racial gerrymandering." It said accountability would be impaired because of the commission selection process, the lack of citizen member qualifications, the ability to spend state money, and the use of outside consultants. The opposing argument and explanation (combined) were written by Robert Paduchik, former chair of the Ohio Republican Party, and submitted by Ohio Works. Although there is some dispute about whether Issue 1 will require gerrymandering, the Toledo Blade Editorial Board has said that "there is an element of gerrymandering in the [Issue 1] amendment." Ohio Governor Mike DeWine was also quoted saying, "Ohio would actually end up with a system that mandates map drawers to produce gerrymandered districts."

== Endorsements ==
=== Support ===
The campaign was endorsed by organizations such as the state's AFL-CIO and other labor unions, American Federation of Teachers, Brennan Center for Justice, Council on American Islamic Relations Ohio, Equality Ohio, NAACP, National Council of Jewish Women (Cleveland), Planned Parenthood Advocates of Ohio, Ohio Environmental Council, Ohio Farmers Union, The Amos Project, and the Ohio Sustainable Business Coalition. The campaign also received support from the Toledo Blade editorial board, The Columbus Dispatch editorial board, Cleveland.com (Plain Dealer), and other columnists. In January 2024, the Leadership Now Project made public a letter by 67 business leaders who supported the constitutional amendment. In September, it was alleged that Citizens Not Politicians had hired a paid actor to be a Republican in their commercial.

Yes

Statewide officials

- Maureen O'Connor, Chief Justice of the Ohio Supreme Court (2011–2022), Associate Justice of the Ohio Supreme Court (2003–2010), Lieutenant Governor of Ohio (1999–2002) (Republican)
- Yvette McGee Brown, Associate Justice of the Ohio Supreme Court (2011–2012) (Democrat)

Legislators

- Nickie Antonio, Senate Minority Leader (D)
- Allison Russo, House Minority Leader (D)
- Hearcel Craig, State Senator (D)
- William DeMora, State Senator (D)
- Paula Hicks-Hudson, State Senator (D)
- Catherine Ingram, State Senator (D)
- Kent Smith, State Senator (D)
- Vernon Sykes, State Senator (D)
- Dani Isaacsohn, State Representative (D)
- Casey Weinstein, State Representative (D)
- Mike Curtin, former State Representative (D)

Individuals

- Arnold Schwarzenegger, actor, governor of California (2003–2011), Chairman of the President's Council on Physical Fitness and Sports (1990–1993) (Republican)
- Thomas Suddes, columnist, former legislative reporter for the Plain Dealer
- Nora Catherine Kelley, columnist
- Marilou Johanek, columnist

Organizations

- League of Women Voters Ohio
- Ohio AFL-CIO and other labor unions
- A. Philip Randolph Institute
- American Federation of Teachers
- Brennan Center for Justice
- Council on American Islamic Relations Ohio
- Equality Ohio
- NAACP
- National Council of Jewish Women (Cleveland)
- Planned Parenthood Advocates of Ohio
- Ohio Environmental Council
- Ohio Farmers Union
- YWCA Greater Cleveland
- Ohio Educational Association
- The Amos Project
- Ohio Sustainable Business Coalition
- Leadership Now Project
- Ohio Democratic Party
- Libertarian Party of Ohio

Newspapers

- The Blade
- The Columbus Dispatch editorial board
- Cleveland.com (Plain Dealer)
- The Cincinnati Enquirer

=== Opposition ===
Ohio Works, the coalition of opponents to Issue 1, believed that a key issue was that elected officials are accountable to voters, whereas they believed that a ballot issue would have created a commission that would have been insulated from accountability to voters. It stated that spending by the proposed commission would not be controlled by Ohio voters.

In opposition to Issue 1, the Republican Senate leadership stated that, "There would be zero accountability to the voters once the citizens panel dissolves.... This really represents an attack on democracy through a fourth branch of government appointed by former members of the judiciary." In August 2024, Speaker of the House Mike Johnson headlined a fundraiser, along with Governor Mike DeWine and GOP Congressmen, to support a political action committee against Issue 1.

Former Chair of the Michigan Independent Citizens Redistricting Commission, Rebecca Szetela, visited Ohio and endorsed a NO vote based on her experience in Michigan where she said the commission has failed in practice. The Ohio plan is closely shaped after Michigan's plan.

On October 17, 2024, a bipartisan group of Black leaders led by Republican State Senator Michelle Reynolds came out in opposition to the proposed amendment. Reynolds, joined by former Democratic State Representative John Barnes, said at the event, "I am deeply concerned about the disastrous effects that Issue 1 will have on the Black state legislative and congressional districts in Ohio. Ohio's Issue 1 could lead to a loss of representation for minority communities as seen in Michigan. Instead of ensuring fairer maps, the reform could fragment cohesive minority voting blocks, diluting our political influence."

No

Elected officials

- Mike DeWine, governor of Ohio (2019–present)
- Dave Yost, attorney general of Ohio (2019–2026)
- Frank LaRose, secretary of state of Ohio (2019–present)
- Keith Faber, state auditor of Ohio (2019–present)
- Mike Johnson, 56th Speaker of the U.S. House of Representatives (2023–present), Member of the U.S. House of Representatives (2017–present)
- Donald Trump, 45th President of The United States (2017-2021), 2024 Republican Party nominee for President of The United States.

Individuals

- Alex Triantafilou, Lawyer, Chair of the Ohio Republican Party

Organizations

- Ohio Republican Party
- Ohio Works
- Ohio Farm Bureau
- Buckeye Firearms Association
- Ohio Chamber of Commerce
- Ohio Health Care Association
- Ohio Manufacturer's Association
- Ohio Oil & Gas Association
- Ohio Right to Life

== Controversies ==
=== Amendment language ===
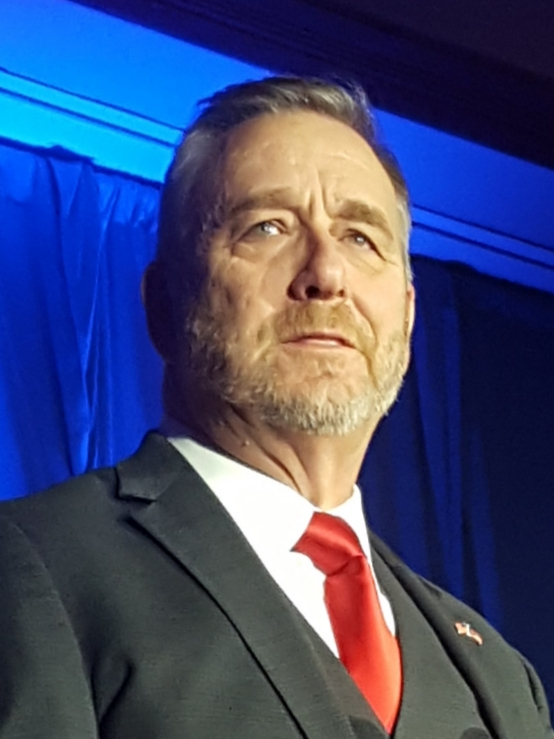
Dave Yost, Ohio Attorney General

The Ohio Attorney General, Republican Dave Yost, twice rejected the proposed amendment before the Citizens Not Politicians campaign could gather signatures for their petition. In September 2023, Yost required that the amendment clarify how party affiliation would be determined, given that the proposed commission would balance the party representatives.

=== Funding of the campaign ===
Citizens Not Politicians reported that it raised $24.8 million for its campaign. It highlighted receiving more than 750 small donations. Donors of $1 million or more include the American Civil Liberties Union, American Federation of Teachers, Ohio Education Association, Ohio Progressive Collaborative, Sixteen Thirty Fund, and the Tides Foundation.

Local news reports indicate that 85% of the funding for Citizens Not Politicians comes from outside Ohio. This funding led some opponents of Issue 1 to claim that the Citizens Not Politicians campaign is "a progressive power grab funded almost entirely by out-of-state dark money."

=== Ballot summary ===
Since the 1970s, initiative summaries were given to voters to avoid confusion over technical, legal language. However, in the lead-up to the 2024 election, the summary of the ballot initiative was a flashpoint for political opposition and legal action. The citizen-initiated petition itself contained a summary, written by the proponents. A very different summary was approved by the Ohio Ballot Board, led by Secretary of State LaRose. (See table, below.)

The supporters of the initiative filed a lawsuit on August 19 against state officials. They objected to several aspects of the language of the Republican-controlled Ballot Board:

- The title was rewritten as: "To create an appointed redistricting commission not elected by or subject to removal by the voters of the state,"
- The summary asserts that the initiative would "limit the right of Ohio citizens to freely express their opinions" to the new Redistricting Commission.
- The summary "describes the amendment, which is specifically intended to prevent partisan gerrymandering, as specifically requiring it."

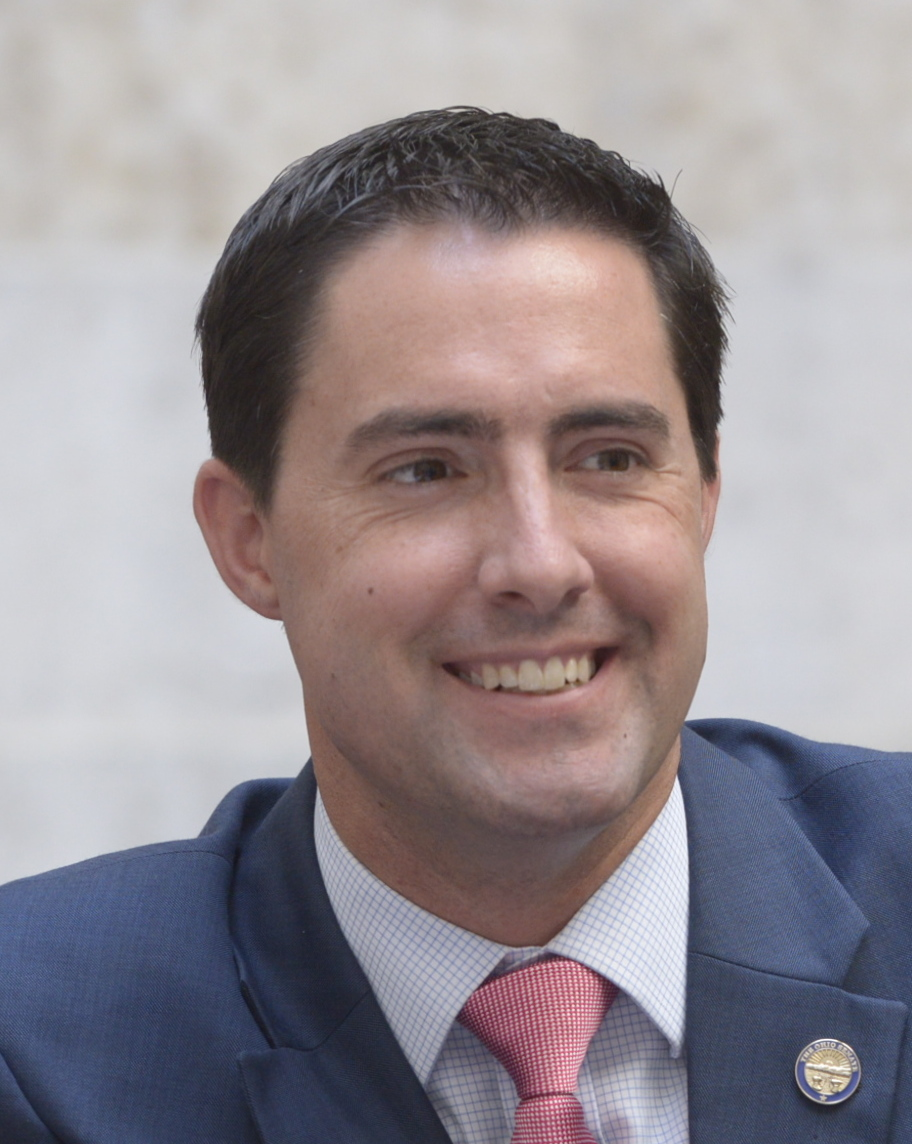
Frank LaRose, chair of the Ohio Ballot Board

This last aspect was highlighted by proponents as objectionable, since the initiative was explicitly designed to stop gerrymandering. The head of Common Cause Ohio stated:

"I just keep thinking about that book '1984.' You know, 'War is peace, freedom is slavery.' The way that the ballot language plays around with the word 'gerrymandering,' to make it mean exactly what it doesn't, is both jaw-dropping and it makes you question the integrity of elected officials."

The lawsuit itself opens by contrasting Issue 1's section 6(B), ""[B]an partisan gerrymandering and prohibit the use of redistricting plans that favor one political party and disfavor others" with the Board's summary wording, ""Establish a new taxpayer-funded commission of appointees required to gerrymander the boundaries of state legislative and congressional districts to favor either of the two largest political parties in the state of Ohio."

The Ballot Board's wording, that the proposed Redistricting Commission would be "required to gerrymander," was proposed by state senator Theresa Gavarone, who claimed that the commission's charge would fit the dictionary definition. If Ohio's congessional districts were drawn without partisan intent, Republicans would be expected to be favored in about 8.6 to 10.1 of 15 districts with a 53% statewide vote share.

The ballot language was largely upheld by the Ohio Supreme Court. On September 16, the court ruled that the Ballot Board should redo two sections of the ballot summary, leaving six disputed sections as is. The misleading sections were about public input and the opportunity for legal challenges to redistricting.

== Polling ==
Poll source	Date(s) administered	Sample size (Note: Key: A – all adults RV – registered voters LV – likely voters V – unclear)	Margin of error	For	Against	Undecided
Miami University	October 28–30, 2024	853 (RV)	± 5.0%	46%	45%	9%
YouGov/Bowling Green State University	October 10–21, 2024	500 (LV)	± 5.14%	57%	34%	9%
YouGov/Bowling Green State University	September 18–27, 2024	1,000 (LV)	± 3.6%	60%	20%	20%

== Outcome ==
The Ohio redistricting amendment was defeated, with unofficial tally of 53.8% to 46.2% of the vote.

The leader of the Citizens Not Politicians campaign, former Justice Maureen O'Connor, alluded to the contested ballot summary in speaking after their proposal's defeat: "In analyzing the vote tonight, it is clear that millions of Ohioans who voted 'yes' want to end gerrymandering, and those who voted 'no' thought they were voting against gerrymandering." A county-by-county and precinct-by-precinct analysis of election results also showed that the measure failed largely along party lines, consistent with 90 to 95% of Kamala Harris voters supporting Issue 1 and about 90% Donald Trump voters against Issue 1, with slightly more Issue 1 support in southeast Ohio and weaker support in northwest Ohio. Speaking for the opposition to the initiative, Ohio Senate President Matt Huffman said, "Voters recognized that establishing an unelected, unaccountably 4th branch of government under Issue 1 was a very bad idea."

The Ohio proposal was "perhaps the most watched" of state ballot initiatives dealing with elections, such as proposals about ranked-choice voting and open primaries.
