= Bob Paduchik =

American political advisor

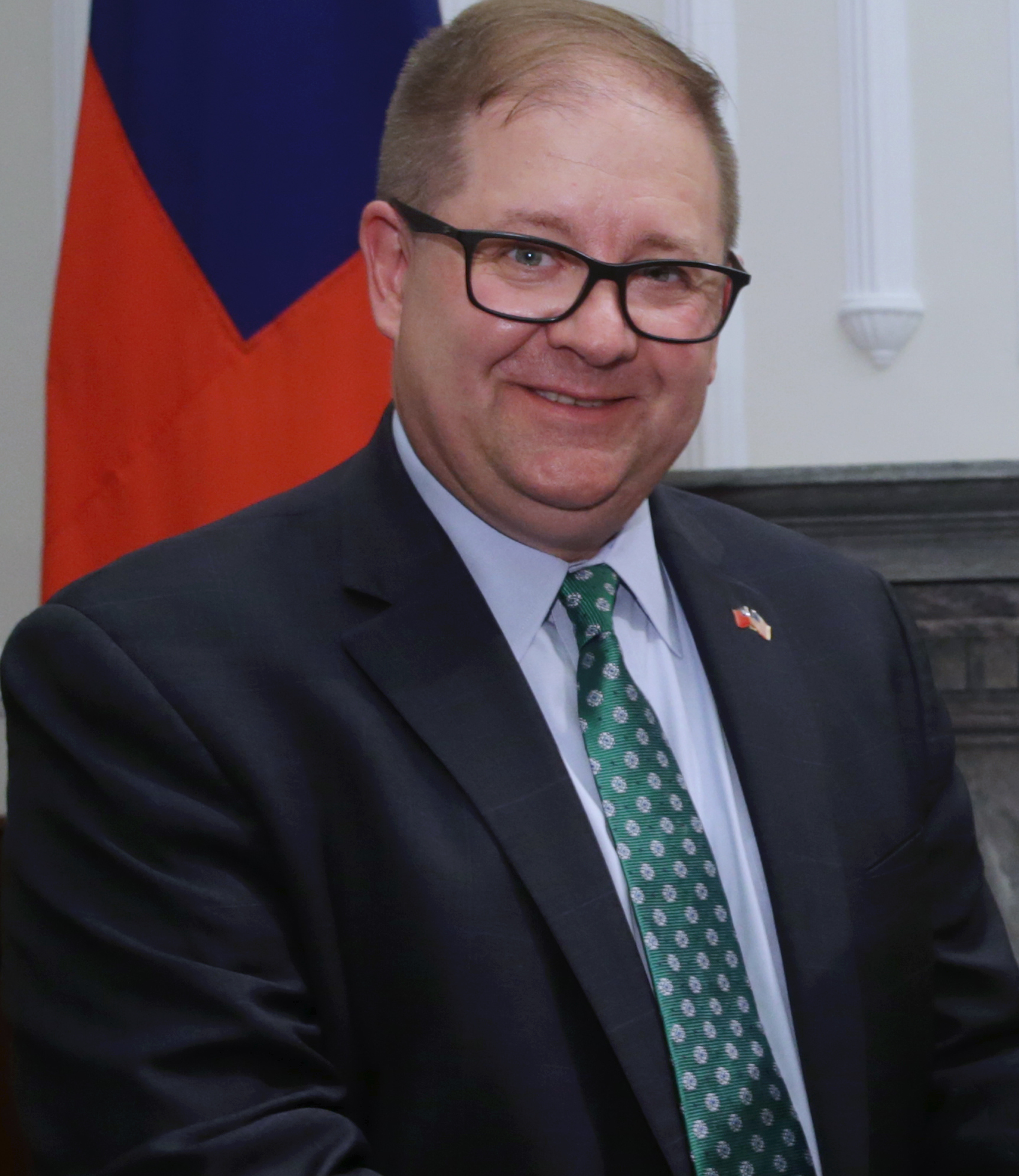

Chair of the Ohio Republican Party
- In office February 26, 2021 – January 6, 2023
- Preceded by: Bryan C. Williams (Acting)
- Succeeded by: Alex Triantafilou

Co-Chair of the Republican National Committee
- In office January, 2017 – January, 2019
- Leader: Ronna McDaniel
- Succeeded by: Thomas O. Hicks Jr.

Personal details
- Born: Robert Anthony Paduchik
- Party: Republican
- Children: 2
- Education: University of Akron (BA)

Robert Anthony Paduchik is an American political advisor who served as the co-chairman of the Republican National Committee from 2017 to 2019. He was also a senior advisor for the Donald Trump 2020 presidential campaign. He was also the campaign's Ohio state director in 2016.

== Early life and education ==
A native of Tallmadge, Ohio, Paduchik earned a Bachelor of Arts degree in political science from the University of Akron in 1989, where he was a member of Tau Kappa Epsilon fraternity. He also earned a certificate from the Ray C. Bliss Institute of Applied Politics.

== Career ==
Paduchik started his professional career at Ohio Department of Transportation during the tenure of Governor George Voinovich. In 1994, Paduchik was the coordinator for Northeast Ohio during the senate campaign of Mike DeWine and then served on the Senator's staff. He became political director in Bob Taft’s campaign to become governor of Ohio in 1998. After the successful campaign, he was appointed Director of Constituent Affairs responsible for minority, veterans, and cultural affairs. In the year 2000, he was executive director of the George W. Bush 2000 presidential campaign in Ohio, on leave from his usual job as Governor Taft's political director.

After the election, Paduchik was a member of the United States Department of Defense Transition Team and was later appointed by George W. Bush as deputy assistant secretary for intergovernmental affairs at the United States Department of Energy. He served in this capacity between October 2001 and January 2003. During this time, he was a driving force in the so-called Yucca Mountain Project.

Paduchik afterwards founded his own company, Agincourt Consultants. Shortly thereafter, he was asked to run Bush's reelection efforts in Ohio in 2004 and succeeded through a grassroots campaign which included the help of about 85,000 volunteers to motivate up to 175,000 new voters, most of whom where presumably Republican, to cast their votes.

He then again moved to the private sector, where he became vice-president of client services at the public affairs firm DCI Group before joining Rob Portman's, who ran for a seat in the U.S. Senate in February 2009. In February 2011, Paduchik became senior vice president of American Coalition for Clean Coal Electricity for state affairs and outreach.

During the 2016 Republican Party presidential primaries, Paduchik became Ohio director of the Donald Trump 2016 presidential campaign and was later described as "the architect of President-elect Donald Trump’s wildly successful campaign in Ohio". Four weeks before Paduchik joined the campaign, the Ohio organization had a relatively small operation in the state. Another burden the campaign had to overcome was a certain opposition by Ohio GOP leaders against candidate Trump, which in fact kept on until late in the campaign and led to a public exchange between Paduchik and Matt Borges, the chair of the Ohio Republican Party. In December 2016, Borges announced his support for Paduchik's upcoming election as deputy chair of the RNC.

In December 2016, President-elect Donald Trump announced Paduchik as next RNC deputy co-chairman, poised to become co-chairman of the RNC in 2017. Indeed, Paduchik's as well as his superior Ronna McDaniel’s election by the Republican National Committee which took place in January 2017 were unanimous.

In February 2018, Trump praised Paduchik during an RNC dinner for his handling of the campaign in the swing state of Ohio.

== Personal life ==
Paduchik lives in Genoa Township with his wife and two daughters. He is a member of the St. Gregory of Nyssa Orthodox Church. He is a member of the board of the Fraternal Order of Police of Ohio Foundation as well as a certified coach for the United States Soccer Federation.

Party political offices
Preceded by Bryan C. Williams; Acting	Chair of the Ohio Republican Party; 2021–2023	Succeeded by Alex Triantafilou
