= Bryan C. Williams =

American politician

Bryan Williams

Acting Chair of the Ohio Republican Party
- In office February 5, 2021 – February 26, 2021
- Preceded by: Jane Timken
- Succeeded by: Bob Paduchik

Member of the Ohio House of Representatives from the 41st district
- In office January 2, 1997 – March 5, 2004
- Preceded by: Karen Doty
- Succeeded by: Marilyn Slaby

Personal details
- Born: 1964 (age 61–62)
- Party: Republican
- Education: Denison University (BA)

Bryan C. Williams is the former acting chairman of the Ohio Republican Party.

== Career ==
He was a Republican member of the Ohio House of Representatives from 1997 to 2004. He resigned on March 5, 2004, to become the Summit County, Ohio Chair of the Board of Elections. He was succeeded by Marilyn Slaby, who went on to lose to another Brian Williams, who was a Democrat.

Williams currently serves on the Ohio State Board of Education, representing District 5. He was elected in November, 2012 to a four-year term. Due to ethics violations, he resigned from the District 7 seat he represented in the prior term.

Following the resignation of chairwoman Jane Timken on February 5, 2021, William became the acting chairman of the Ohio Republican Party, due to previously holding the position of vice chairman.

== Personal life ==
He resides in Fairlawn, with his wife and 2 of 3 children.

Party political offices
Preceded by Jane Timken	Chair of the Ohio Republican Party; Acting; 2021	Succeeded by Bob Paduchik
