= Jane Timken =

Former chair of the Ohio Republican Party

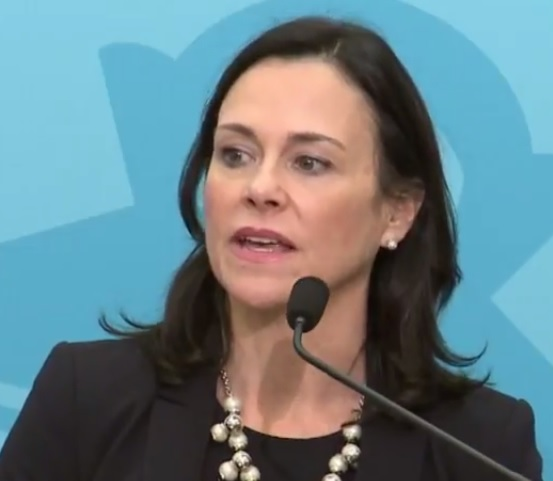
- Timken in 2017

Member of the Ohio Senate from the 29th district
- Incumbent
- Assumed office January 29, 2025
- Preceded by: Kirk Schuring

Republican National Committeewoman from Ohio
- Incumbent
- Assumed office April 29, 2024
- Preceded by: Jo Ann Davidson

Chair of the Ohio Republican Party
- In office January 7, 2017 – February 5, 2021
- Preceded by: Matt Borges
- Succeeded by: Bryan C. Williams (acting)

Personal details
- Born: Jane Eileen Murphy; November 5, 1966 (age 59) Cincinnati, Ohio, U.S.
- Party: Republican
- Spouse: Ward Timken (m. 1994)
- Children: 2
- Relatives: William R. Timken (uncle-in-law)
- Education: Harvard University (BA); American University (JD)

Jane Eileen Timken (née Murphy; born November 5, 1966) is an American politician and attorney serving as a member of the Ohio Senate for the 29th district. She previously served as chair of the Ohio Republican Party from 2017 to 2021. She was a candidate in the 2022 United States Senate election in Ohio. She is the female committee member representing Ohio to the Republican National Committee since April 29, 2024, succeeding Jo Ann Davidson.

== Early life and education ==
Timken was born Jane Eileen Murphy in Cincinnati, Ohio, the daughter of John and Eileen Murphy. Her father was a law professor and her mother was a Scottish-born nurse. Timken graduated from Walnut Hills High School.

Timken graduated from Harvard College with a degree in psychology and played rugby while she was there. She received her Juris Doctor, summa cum laude, from American University Washington College of Law.

== Career ==
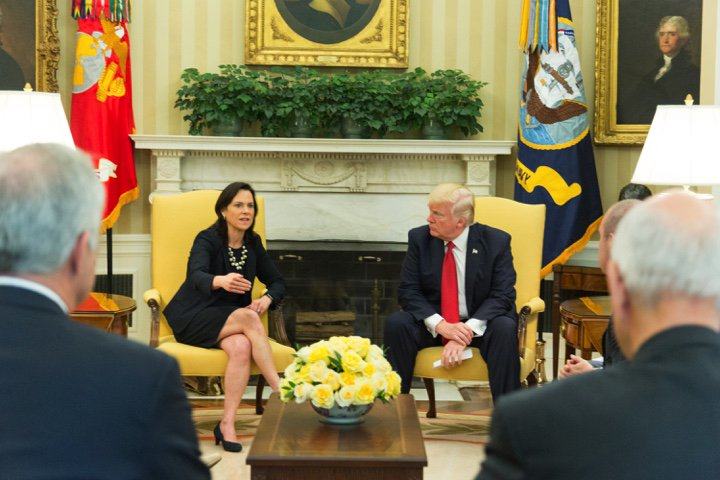
Timken meets with President Donald Trump in May 2017

She was elected vice chair of the Stark County Republican Party in May 2010. In 2016, she had initially supported Governor of Ohio John Kasich's candidacy the 2016 Republican presidential primary. Timken hosted a fundraiser attended by Donald Trump weeks after he secured the party's nomination in 2016.

Timken was elected as the first female chairwoman of the Ohio Republican Party in January 2017. She ousted incumbent chair Matt Borges, an ally of Kasich who refused to endorse Trump in the 2016 election.

While serving as chair, Timken refused to sign a pledge stating the GOP would not use hacked information in campaigns.

=== 2022 Senate election ===
Timken remained chair until resigning in February 2021 to run for U.S. Senate in the 2022 election, following the announcement that incumbent Republican Rob Portman would not seek re-election.

During the race, she sought to present herself as a Donald Trump loyalist, mirrored his talking points and said she would "advance the Trump agenda". In her announcement speech for the 2022 campaign, she attacked former Governor Kasich, whose presidential candidacy she had supported in 2016.

Timken lost the primary election to JD Vance, ultimately coming in fifth place in a field of seven candidates. She received less than 6% of the vote in the statewide Republican primary. Timken over-performed in her home county of Stark County, where she came in fourth place with 15% of the vote.

=== Ohio Senate ===
On January 24, 2025, Timken was appointed to the Ohio Senate from the 29th district. She assumed office on January 29, 2025, succeeding Kirk Schuring, who died from cancer in November 2024.

== Personal life ==
Timken lives in Stark County, Ohio, with her husband Ward J. "Tim" Timken Jr., the former chairman, CEO, and president of TimkenSteel. She has two children. Her husban'd uncle, William R. Timken, is a former United States ambassador to Germany.

Party political offices
Preceded by Matt Borges	Chair of the Ohio Republican Party; 2017–2021	Succeeded by Bryan C. Williams; Acting
