= Matt Borges =

American political party official

Chair of the Ohio Republican Party
- In office May 31, 2012 – January 6, 2017
- Preceded by: Kevin DeWine
- Succeeded by: Jane Timken

Personal details
- Party: Republican
- Education: Ohio State University (BA)

Mathew Borges is an American politician who was the chairman of the Ohio Republican Party from 2012 to 2017. He was replaced when President-elect Donald Trump supported his opposition. In 2020, he joined other former Trump and Bush administration officials in launching the Right Side PAC, a super PAC encouraging Republicans to vote for Joe Biden over Trump in 2020.

In June 2023, he was sentenced to five years in federal prison for his role in the Ohio nuclear bribery scandal, where he accepted part of $60 million in bribes to pass a $1.3 billion bailout bill benefiting FirstEnergy, the corporate owner of Ohio's Perry and Davis–Besse nuclear plants. It was called the largest corruption scandal in Ohio's history.

== Early life and education ==
Of Portuguese descent, Borges grew up in Barrington, Rhode Island, and earned a B.A. in political science from The Ohio State University in 1994. He and his wife, Kate, live in Bexley, Ohio.

== Politics ==
Borges spent most of his early career working on state and local political campaigns in Ohio. He ran local campaigns before running Joe Deters' successful campaigns for Ohio Treasurer of State in 1998 and 2002.

Borges has worked on several presidential campaigns, and traveled the world as an Advance Representative for the George W. Bush White House from 2001 to 2008. He worked on John McCain's presidential campaign in 2008. In 2010, Borges ran the successful statewide campaign of Dave Yost, who now serves as Ohio Attorney General. Borges served as Executive Director for the Kasich-Taylor Inaugural Committee in 2011.

Borges was elected chairman of the Ohio Republican Party in 2012 and served two two-year terms. He was replaced by Jane Timken in 2017, after Timken received support from President-elect Trump.

In 2019 was appointed by Ohio Governor Mike DeWine to the Board of Trustees at Columbus State University.

In February 2020, he backed Joe Biden's presidential campaign to undermine the campaign of Bernie Sanders. In June 2020, Borges joined with Anthony Scaramucci and other former Trump and Bush administration officials to launch Right Side PAC, a super PAC encouraging Republicans to vote for Joe Biden over Donald Trump.

== Controversies and arrest ==
=== Unauthorized use of public office ===
In 2004, Borges pleaded to one count of unauthorized use of a public office, paid a $1,000 fine, and was later granted an expungement.

=== Unpaid taxes and liens ===
Between 2005 and 2019, Borges was – according to the Dayton Daily News – "embroiled in a dispute over unpaid taxes and liens". According to Borges, he had started to repay approximately $150,000 in state and federal tax arrears by 2013, with the matter being ultimately settled in 2019.

=== Ohio nuclear bribery scandal ===
In July 2020, Borges, along with Speaker of the Ohio House of Representatives Larry Householder, and three others were arrested by Federal authorities in the largest corruption scandal in Ohio's history. They were accused of accepting $60 million in bribes from FirstEnergy in exchange for $1.3 billion of benefits to FirstEnergy. The benefits came through Ohio House Bill 6, which increased electricity rates and provided the $1.3 billion as a bailout of $150 million per year for two nuclear plants owned by FirstEnergy—Davis–Besse and Perry.

Although Borges was not involved when the bribery and money laundering scheme began in 2016, prosecutors alleged that he joined the effort at a later stage to help defeat the ballot referendum, preserve the nuclear bailout, and receive payments funded by FirstEnergy. He was charged with racketeering conspiracy under the federal RICO Act. Borges pleaded not guilty to the charges and declined a federal plea deal that would have resulted in a lighter sentence.

On March 9, 2023, Borges was found guilty of racketeering. On June 30, 2023, he was sentenced to five years in federal prison.

Credits earned through participation in recidivism reduction programs and educational courses under the First Step Act allowed Borges to reduce his sentence. He was released early from prison on October 9, 2025, after serving less than half of his five-year term. Borges will remain in a halfway house or under home confinement until October 6, 2026, after which he is scheduled to serve one year of supervised release.

Former Ohio House Speaker Larry Householder was found guilty of racketeering conspiracy and is currently serving the remainder of his 20-year sentence at a federal prison in Oklahoma.

Party political offices
Preceded by Kevin DeWine	Chair of the Ohio Republican Party; 2013–2017	Succeeded by Jane Timken
