= Alex Triantafilou =

American lawyer (born 1971)

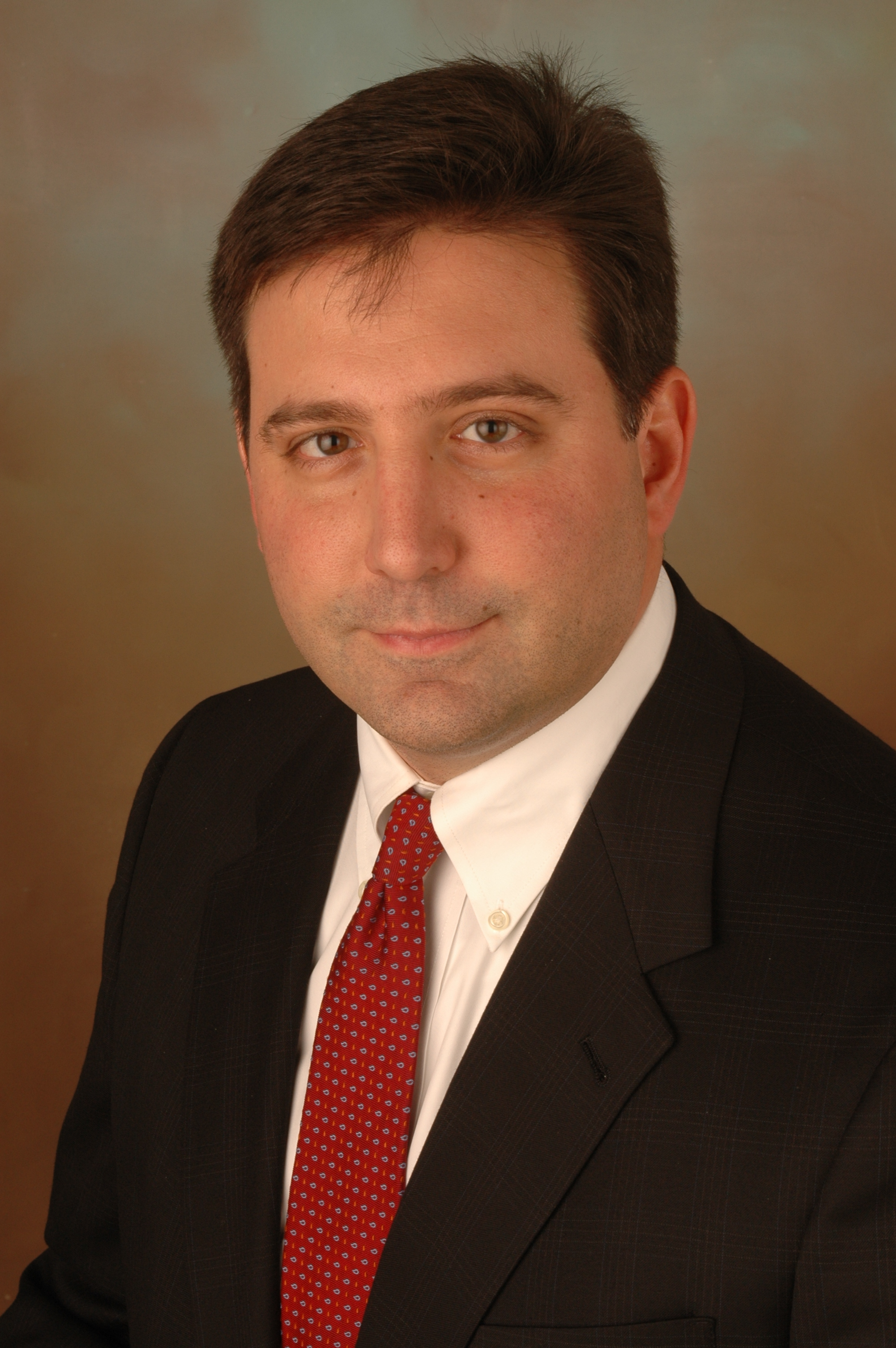

Chair of the Ohio Republican Party
- Incumbent
- Assumed office January 6, 2023
- Preceded by: Bob Paduchik

Personal details
- Born: July 4, 1971 (age 55) Cincinnati, Ohio, U.S.
- Party: Republican
- Education: University of Cincinnati (BA); Northern Kentucky University (JD)

Alex M. Triantafilou (pronounced tree-aunt-a-FEE-loo; born July 4, 1971) is an attorney, judge, and politician. His is currently the chairman of the Ohio Republican Party, having previously been chairman of the Hamilton County Republican Party.

== Career ==
Triantafilou worked as an assistant prosecuting attorney for Hamilton County prosecutor Joseph T. Deters. He also worked in the office of the Hamilton County Clerk of Courts, Greg Hartmann.

In 2005, Triantafilou was appointed and subsequently won election to the Hamilton County Municipal Court. In 2006, he was appointed to the Hamilton County Court of Common Pleas. From 2008-2023, he was chairman of the Hamilton County Republican Party. He became chairman of the Ohio Republican Party in January 2023.

Prior to getting into politics, Triantafilou was a magistrate, hearing cases regularly before the mayors' courts of Newtown and Harrison, Ohio, and a partner at the law firm of Dinsmore & Shohl.

Triantafilou in January 2025 commented on Issue 1 on gerrymandering, where Triantafilou said that "we did our job" because "a lot" of voters were "confused by Issue 1", which means voters "don't know", thus Triantafilou concluded: "Confusing Ohioans was not such a bad strategy."

== Personal life ==
Triantafilou was born and raised in Cincinnati to a family of Greek ancestry. He is a graduate of Oak Hills High School, the University of Cincinnati, and the Salmon P. Chase College of Law. He resides in Green Township, Ohio with his wife Jennifer and has a son, Michael. He is a parishioner of Holy Trinity-St. Nicholas Greek Orthodox Church in Finneytown, Ohio. Triantafilou has been involved in the Ohio Mock Trial program through his alma mater, Oak Hills High School.

== Controversy ==
On April 29, 2009, Triantafilou posted a picture of Senator Arlen Specter, who had recently switched from being a Republican to being a Democrat, on his blog; the picture showed Specter bald after his bout with cancer and compared him to Dr. Evil from the Austin Powers film series. After receiving criticisms from Democratic leaders, including Tim Burke, the Democratic Party Chairman in Hamilton County, Triantafilou removed the picture and post from his site.

Party political offices
| Preceded by Bob Paduchik | Chair of the Ohio Republican Party; 2023–present | Incumbent |
