= Brian Williams (Ohio politician) =

American politician

Brian G. Williams

Member of the Ohio House of Representatives from the 41st district
- In office January 3, 2005 – December 31, 2010
- Preceded by: Marilyn Slaby
- Succeeded by: Lynn Slaby

Personal details
- Born: April 3, 1942 (age 84) Akron, Ohio
- Party: Democratic
- Education: University of Akron
- Profession: Educator

Brian G. Williams (born April 3, 1942) is a Democratic politician who served in the Ohio House of Representatives. He represented District 41 from 2005 through 2011.

== Life and career ==
A former educator and school superintendent, Williams moved to politics after a long career in the Akron City School System.

== Ohio House of Representatives ==
When Representative, Bryan C. Williams resigned early to take another job in 2004, Republicans appointed Marilyn Slaby to a potential viable seat for Democrats. Benefitting from name recognition and a potentially good year for Democrats, Williams entered the race. He defeated Slaby by fewer than 1000 votes to take his seat. He won reelection in 2006 easily over former NFL player Tom Cousineau.

By 2008, Democrats were on the verge of taking over the majority in the Ohio House of Representatives. While the hometown Akron Beacon Journal newspaper supported Williams' opponent Randy Cole, Williams won a third term, as Democrats took control of the majority. Two years later, Republicans took control by ousting thirteen Democrats, including Williams.

With the 2010 cycle, Marilyn Slaby's husband, Lynn Slaby, ran for the seat formerly held by his wife, and challenged Williams. In an overwhelmingly Republican year, Slaby defeated Williams. Following his defeat, Williams retired.
