= Ohio Environmental Council =

American environmental organization

- Formation: 1969; 57 years ago
- Type: Nonprofit
- Tax ID no.: 31-0805578
- Legal status: 501(c)(3)
- Headquarters: Columbus, Ohio
- Board Chair: Rich Shank
- Board of directors: Rich Shank; Jeniece Brock; Marianne Eppig; Dan Gray; Peter R. Griesinger; Andy Jones, MS, CPM; Rebecca Karason, CEM; William Katzin, MD, PhD; Ben Kessler; Krista Magaw, MS; Graham Mitchell, MES; Francisco “Paco” Ollervides, PhD; William M. Ondrey Gruber; Sam Schwab; Jennifer Sconyers; Mike Shelton; Alex Slaymaker; Andrew Watterson; Tom Winston, PE
- Website: https://theoec.org/

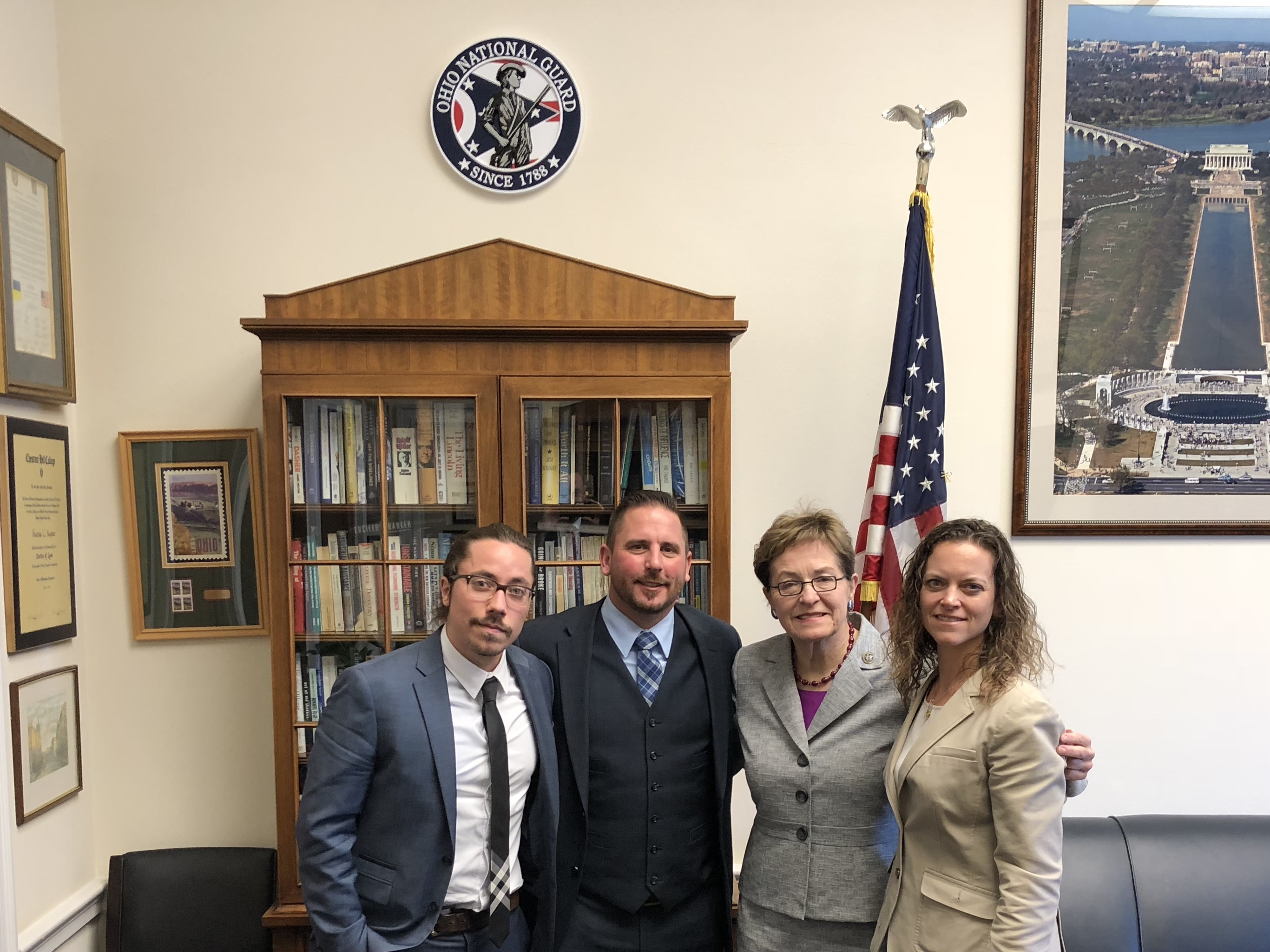
Rep. Kaptur met with Kristy Meyer of Ohio Environmental Council

The Ohio Environmental Council is an environmental organization founded in 1969. Its work includes the environment, clean energy, and democracy.

== Environment ==
OEC praised Columbus's Climate Action Plan. OEC jointly sought action against pollution of Lake Erie and toxic algal blooms. OEC also sought to limit PFAS pollution called forever chemicals.

== Clean energy ==
The OEC vouched for Icebreaker wind energy off the shores of Cleveland. OEC objected to siting changes that would block solar farms. OEC called a bill permitting energy efficiency programs a good first step.

== Democracy ==
OEC filed an amicus brief opposing gerrymandered maps. As part of the Ohio Fair Courts Alliance, OEC encouraged voters to engage with judicial races. OEC also endorsed the Citizens Not Politicians campaign for the 2024 Issue 1 ballot initiative against gerrymandering.
