= Lynn Slaby =

American politician (born 1938)

Member of the Ohio House of Representatives from the 41st district
- In office January 3, 2011-March 28, 2012
- Preceded by: Brian Williams
- Succeeded by: Marilyn Slaby

Personal details
- Born: November 4, 1938 (age 87) Akron, Ohio
- Party: Republican
- Education: University of Akron
- Profession: Lawyer

Lynn Slaby (born November 4, 1938) is a Republican politician who served as a member of the Ohio House of Representatives from 2011 to 2012. He is the husband of Representative Marilyn Slaby. Currently he is a commissioner for the Public Utilities Commission of Ohio.

== Career ==
Slaby was born and raised in Akron, and attended the University of Akron. He worked as the Summit County prosecuting attorney before Gov. Voinovich appointed him to the appeals court in 1995.

== Ohio House of Representatives ==
While Representative Brian Williams had faced several formidable opponents, he had remained to become a three-term incumbent. In 2010, Slaby sought to run against him. While he faced a primary challenge from Lance Reed, Slaby easily won the Republican nomination by 3,653 votes. In the general election, in an overwhelmingly Republican year, Slaby defeated Williams by 2,205 votes.

He was sworn into his first term on January 3, 2011. Speaker of the House William G. Batchelder named Slaby as Chairman of the Criminal Justice Committee, with Slaby being the only freshman Chairman. He also served on the committees of Finance and Appropriations and its Higher Education Subcommittee, and Judiciary and Ethics. Slaby is also a member of the Ohio Council for Interstate Adult Offender Supervision; the State Criminal Sentencing Commission; and the RECLAIM Advisory Committee.

== Initiatives, policies and positions ==
In one of his first initiatives, Slaby co-sponsored a bill that would institute new provisions on ensuring that a minor is of a sound mind before receiving an abortion.

Along with Ron Young, Slaby has proposed legislation that aims to speed up resolutions surrounding consumer lawsuits.
