= Marilyn Slaby =

American politician (1939–2026)

Member of the Ohio House of Representatives from the 41st district
- In office April 24, 2012 – December 31, 2018
- Preceded by: Lynn Slaby
- Succeeded by: Bill Roemer
- In office March 5, 2004 – December 31, 2004
- Preceded by: Bryan C. Williams
- Succeeded by: Brian Williams

Personal details
- Born: November 19, 1939 Akron, Ohio, U.S.
- Died: October 22, 2026 (aged 86)
- Party: Republican
- Education: Heidelberg College
- Occupation: Teacher

Marilyn Slaby (November 19, 1939 – October 22, 2026) was an American politician who was a Republican member of the Ohio House of Representatives. She served the 41st District from her appointment in 2012 to 2018, having previously served the same district in 2004. She was married to former representative Lynn Slaby.

== Life and career ==
=== Background ===
A graduate of Heidelberg College, Slaby worked as an educator for much of her life and for ten years served on the Summit County Board of Elections. Slaby served as vice-chair of the Summit County Central Committee and was an elected member of the Republican State Central Committee. She owned multiple small businesses.

Slaby and her husband, Lynn, had three children and four grandchildren. She died on October 22, 2026, at the age of 86.

== Ohio House of Representatives ==
In 2004, Rep. Bryan C. Williams resigned from District 41, forcing House Republicans to find a successor. Eventually, Slaby was appointed to the vacancy, and was established as the candidate for the general election. However, she lost the general election to Brian Williams, a Democrat, by less than 300 votes.

Williams lost reelection in 2010, to Slaby's husband, Lynn Slaby. In early 2012, then-Governor John Kasich appointed Lynn Slaby to the Public Ulilities Commission of Ohio (aka PUCO), leaving the seat vacant, once again. For the second time, Marilyn Slaby was appointed to the position. She was sworn into office on April 24, 2012, and served on the committees of Economic and Small Business Development; Health and Aging; and Insurance.

Due to Republican-lead redistricting that is facing a legal challenge of gerrymandering, Slaby was able to secure election to District 38 for a full term in November 2012 with 54.55% of the vote over Democrat Michael Kaplan. She defeated Democrat Tim Crawford in 2014, and Democrat Judith Lynn Lee in 2016. Slaby filed for re-election in 2018, but withdrew her candidacy in February 2018.

During her tenure, she voted to repeal the corporate franchise tax (HB 510, 2012), lift interest rate limits on credit cards (HB 322, 2012), reduce absentee voting days (HB 238, 2014), allow concealed carry on school property (HB 8, 2014), allow firearms silencers (HB 234, 2014), reduce taxes on oil and gas drilling operations (HB 375, 2014), increase the salary of elected officials, including her own (HB 661, 2014), allow religious expression in public school (HB 425, 2016), roll back energy efficiency standards (HB 114, 2017).

Slaby co-sponsored bills to authorize off-campus religious credits for high school credit (HB 171, 2013), criminalize abortion (HB 248, 2013; HB 69, 2015; HB 294, 2015, 2015; HB 493, 2016), prohibit Syrian refugees from resettling in the US (HB 31, 2015), allow clergy to discriminate (HB 36, 2017), Stand Your Ground (aka Kill at Will) and prohibit municipalities from implementing restrictions on firearms (HB 228, 2017).

During the 2018 Lame Duck Session, Slaby voted for the industry-backed HB 625, which would prohibit municipalities from taxing or banning plastic bags and other packaging containers, HB 228 aka Kill at Will, which would also reduce penalties for Concealed Carry violations, and the anti-abortion heartbeat bill HB 258, even though similar bills have been blocked and/or overturned in every other state that has signed them into law.
