= Ohio Republican Party =

Ohio affiliate of the Republican Party

- Chairperson: Alex Triantafilou
- Governor: Mike DeWine
- Lieutenant Governor: Jim Tressel
- Senate President: Rob McColley
- House Speaker: Matt Huffman
- Founded: February 13, 1854; 172 years ago
- Headquarters: 211 South Fifth Street Columbus, Ohio 43215
- Ideology: Conservatism
- National affiliation: Republican Party
- Colors: Red
- Seats in the U.S. Senate: 2 / 2
- Seats in the U.S. House of Representatives: 10 / 15
- State Elected Executives: 6 / 6
- Seats in the Ohio Senate: 24 / 33
- Seats in the Ohio House of Representatives: 65 / 99
- Seats on the Ohio Supreme Court: 6 / 7
- County Commissioners/County Councilmen: 244 / 280

Election symbol

Website
- www.ohiogop.org

The Ohio Republican Party (ORP) is the Ohio affiliate of the Republican Party. It was founded in Columbus, Ohio, in 1854.

It currently holds the bulk of the state's political power, controlling 10 of Ohio's 15 U.S. House seats, both of its U.S. Senate seats, all statewide executive offices, supermajorities in both houses of the state legislature, and a majority on Ohio's State Supreme Court.

== History ==
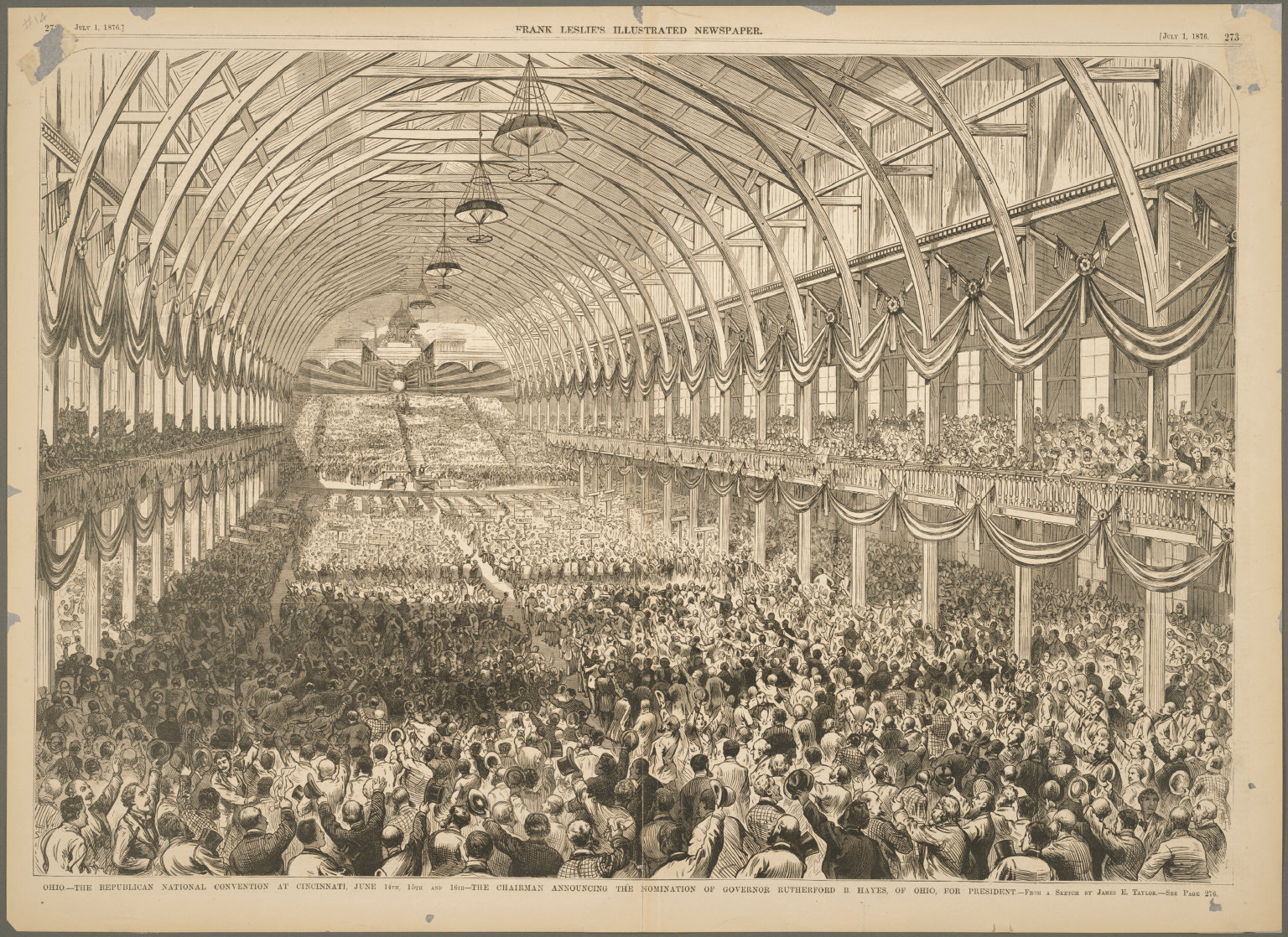
The Republican National Convention at Cincinnati 1876

After the Civil War, Ohio politics was dominated by the Republican Party, and Ohio Republicans also played key roles in the national party. As the national Republican Party changed from a party affiliated with Northern states into a staunchly conservative party, so did the Ohio Republican Party.

=== Early years ===
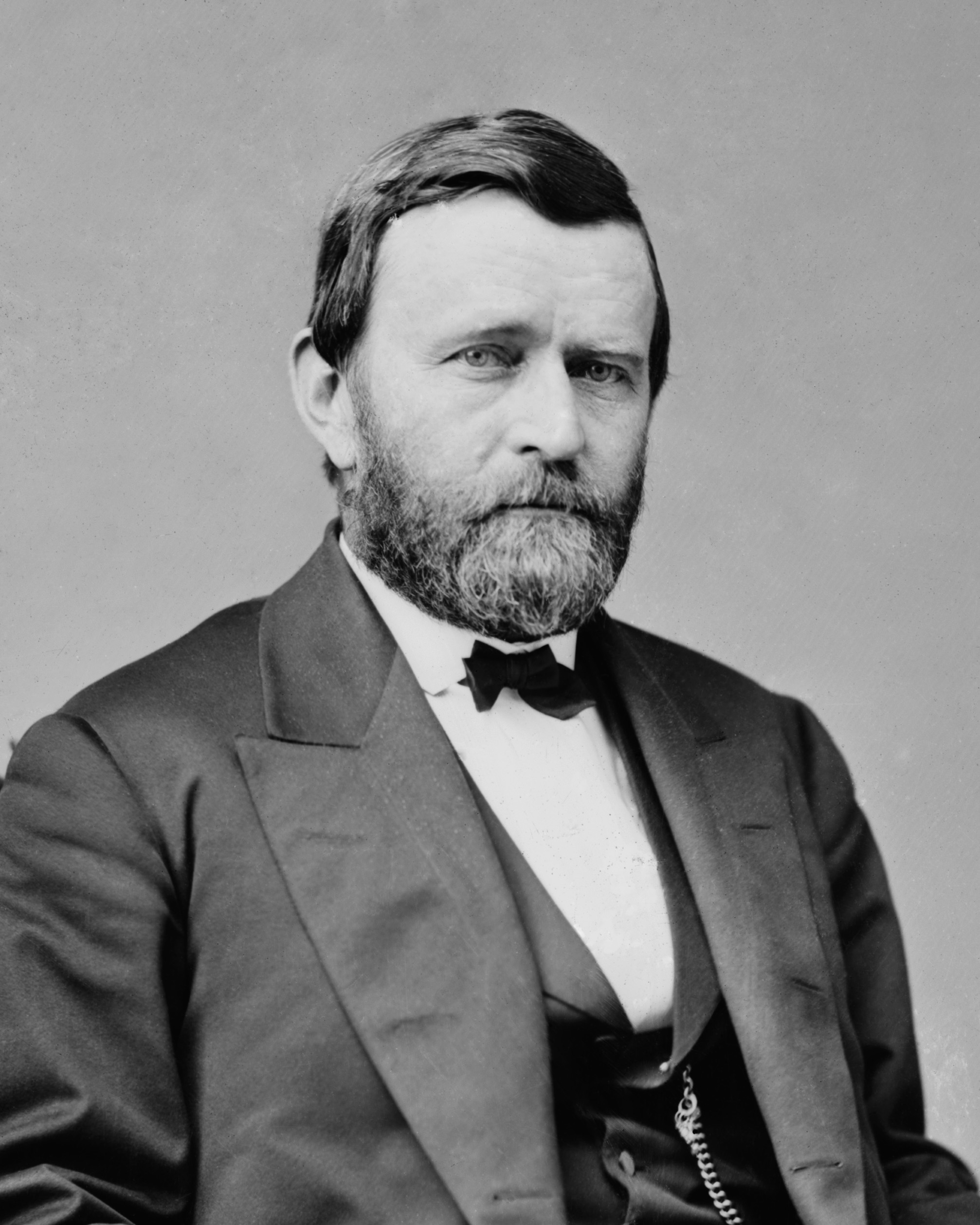
President Ulysses S. Grant (1869–1877)

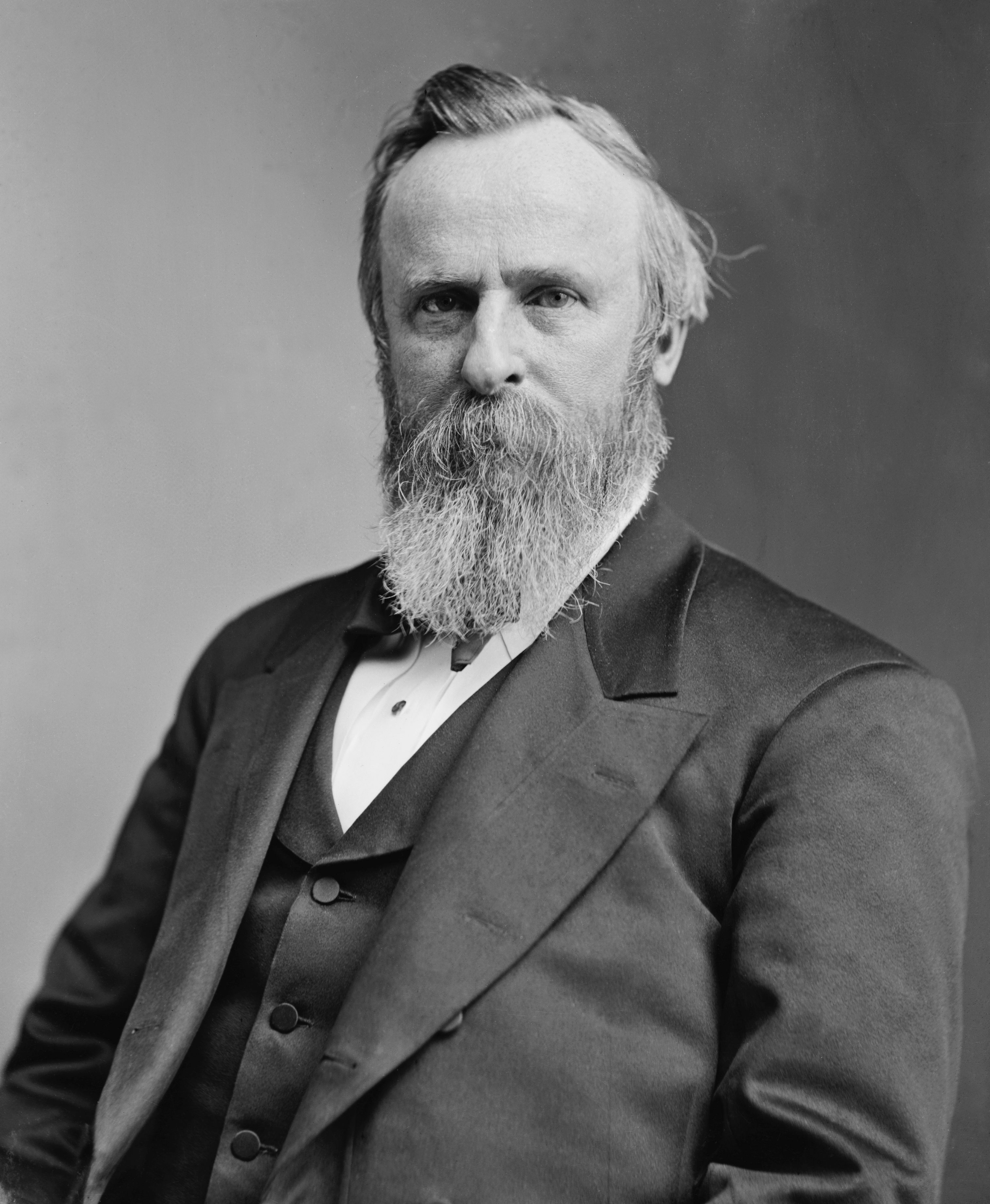
Rutherford B. Hayes (1877–1881)

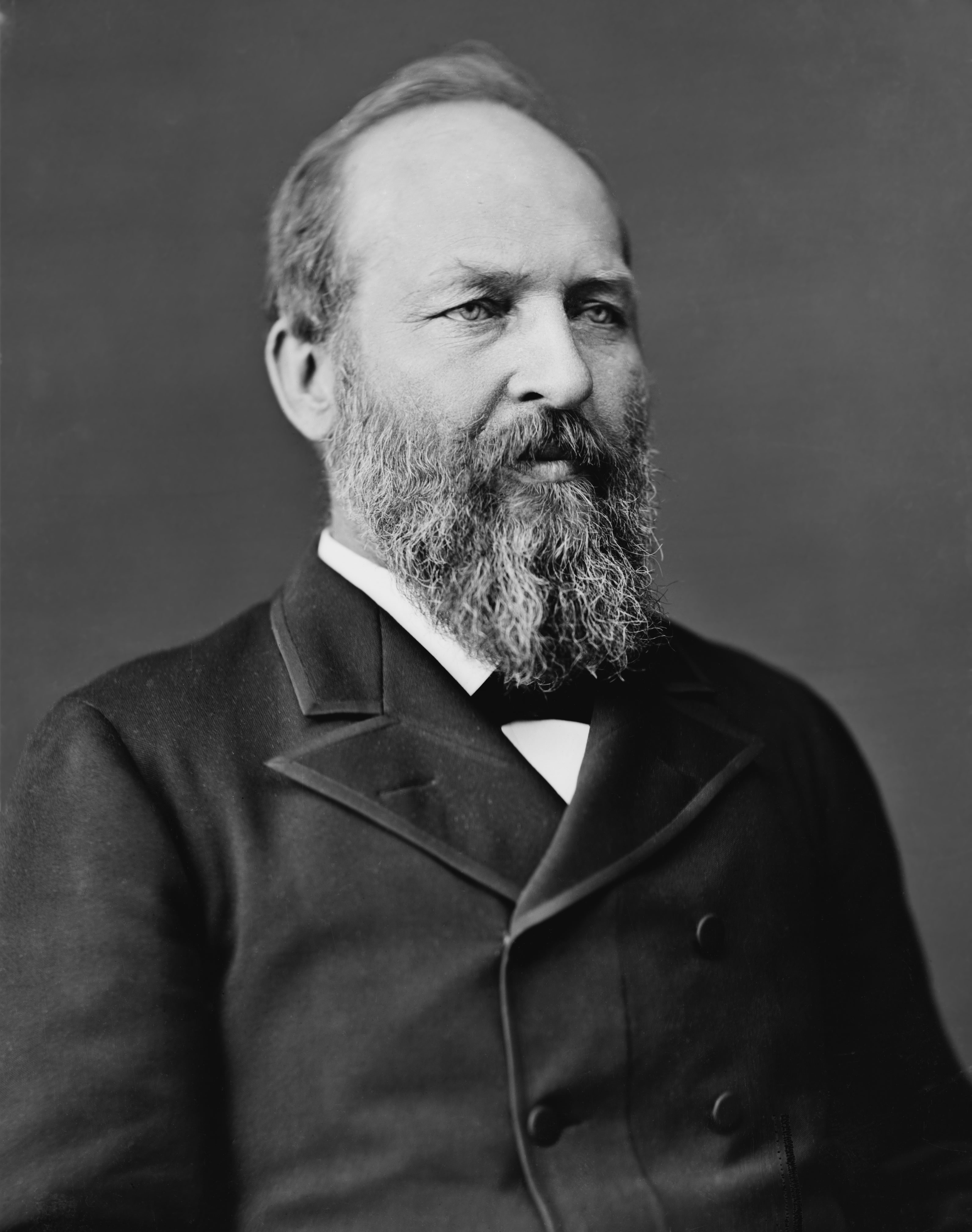
President James A. Garfield (1881)

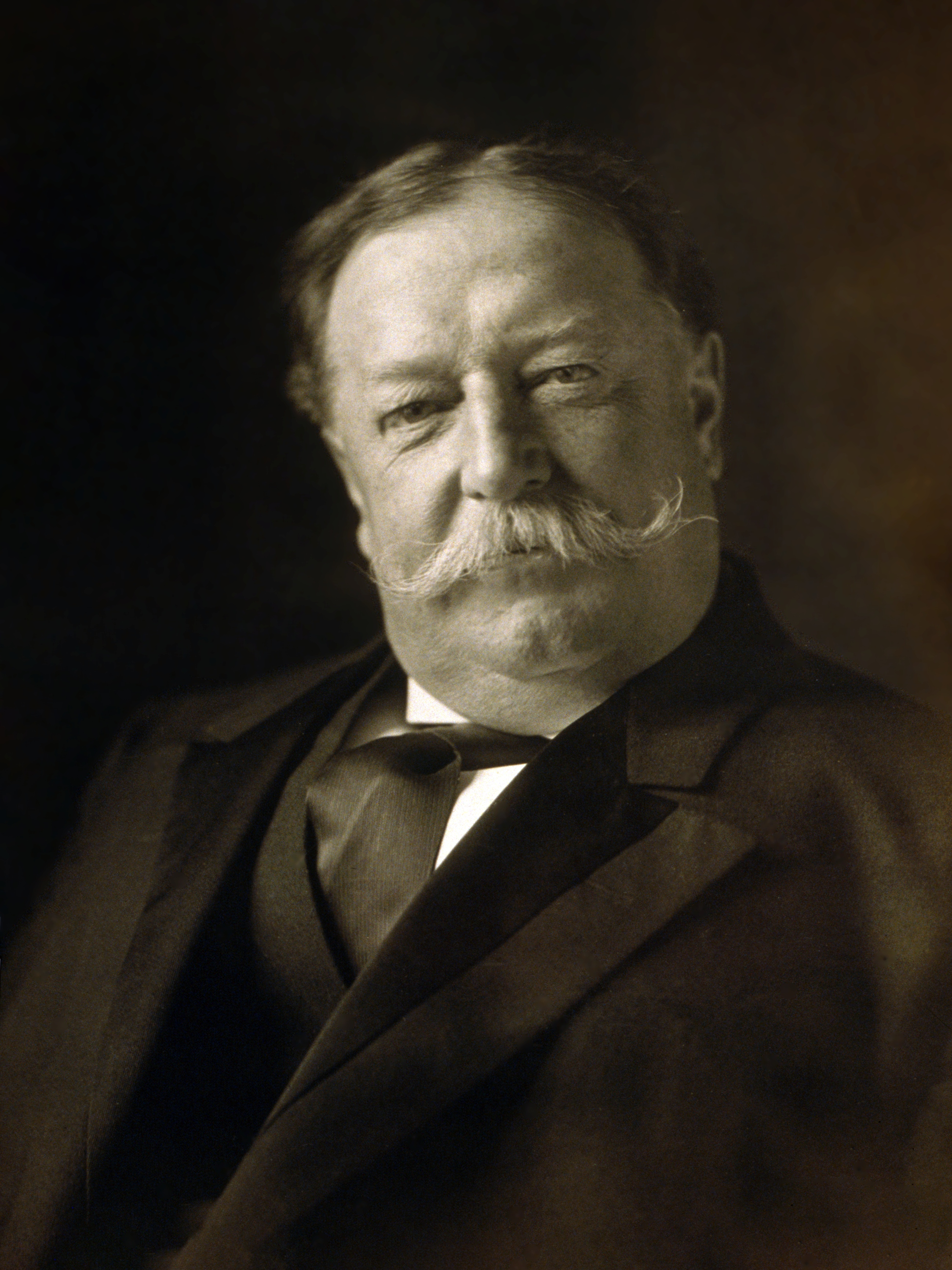
President William H. Taft (1909–1913)

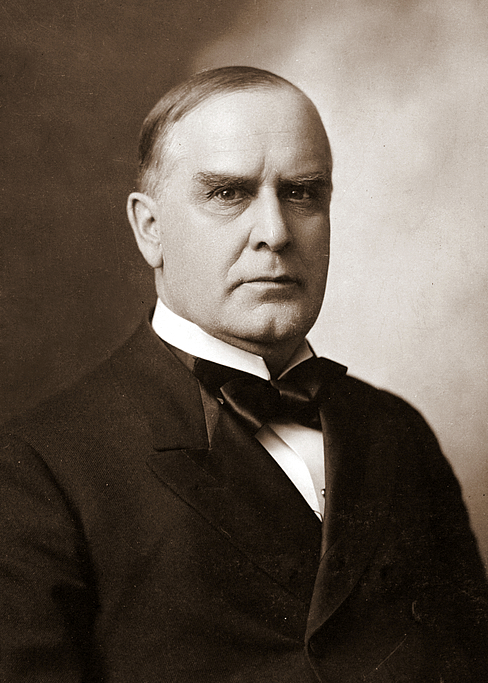
President William McKinley (1897–1901)

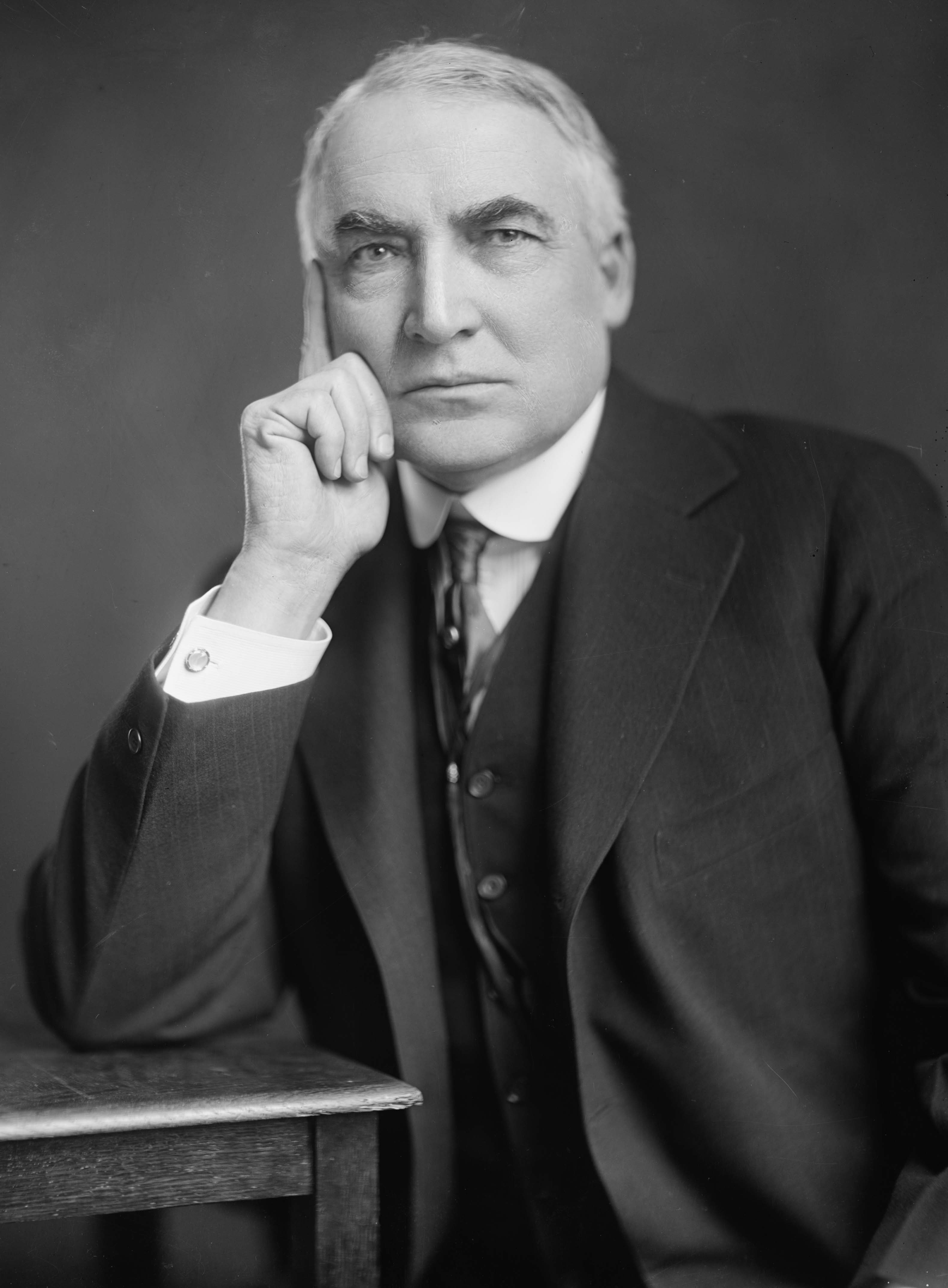
President Warren G. Harding (1921–1923)

Early Ohio Republicans such as Salmon P. Chase staffed many important national offices. Chase coined the phrase "Free Soil, Free Labor, Free Men". Starting in the 1880s, Ohio's Mark Hanna was a significant power in the back rooms of the national Republican party. In the 1890s, Hanna led the conservative wing of the party against Theodore Roosevelt's progressive movement.

In the 60 years from 1860 to 1920, Ohioans headed the Republican presidential ticket nine times, losing only twice. In 1912, Democrat Woodrow Wilson won with 40.96 percent of the vote, the Republican ticket was split, with Theodore Roosevelt leaving to start the Bull-Moose Party. In the 1916 election, Wilson won again with 49.24 percent of the vote.

During the next three presidential elections, the Republican candidate won Ohio, until 1932 when Franklin D. Roosevelt won the state. FDR would win Ohio in 1932, 1936, and 1940.

=== Post New Deal ===
The national political upheaval that ushered in the New Deal era in the 1930s benefited the Ohio Democratic Party. Party politics in Ohio became very competitive, with Republicans and Democrats trading victories at all levels.

During this time Robert A. Taft, known as "Mr. Republican," became the leader of the conservative wing of the Republican party during a time when progressives controlled both major parties, and one of the most popular Senators in Ohio history.

From the 1930s to the 1970s, Republicans still won the majority of elective offices in Ohio. Starting in the 1960s Ohio Democrats began to win more elections with rulings from the United States Supreme Court that required district representation be based on population and not land sized. The equalization of legislative districts shifted power to Ohio's cities and away from rural farmers. By the mid-1980s, Ohio government at all levels was dominated by Democrats.

By 1990, the Republicans had won a majority on the Ohio Apportionment Board, which draws district lines for federal and state legislative seats. The 1992 adoption of term limits by referendum further strengthened the party's hand and 1992 marked the last victory by a Democrat (John Glenn) in a statewide race until 2006.

=== State of the party ===
Redistricting after the 2000 census combined with Ohio's term limits laws had Republican officeholders at the federal and state levels struggling with each other to draw federal congressional districts to create safe seats, with the interests of incumbent US representatives clashing with the interests of state legislators facing term limits looking to Congress for their next jobs. About 43 percent of the voters voted for Democrats in 2000.

Joe Hallett wrote in the Columbus Dispatch (January 13, 2002):

Redistricting should be a happy process for Republicans.... But the task has hardly been gleeful. Contrarily, it has turned into an embarrassment for Republicans.... Eight-year term limits, more than the state budget, are to blame. These days, state lawmakers constantly are scouting their next jobs.... [V]isions of Congress dance in their heads. They want districts ready-made for their ascensions. Meanwhile, congressional incumbents constantly angle for districts they can't possibly lose.

Although term limits were pushed by conservative Republican activists in the 1980s, they forced the retirement of Republican Speaker Jo Ann Davidson (R-Columbus) from the House of Representatives in 2001 as well as the leader of the conservative wing of the party, Deputy Speaker William G. Batchelder (R-Medina).

In 2001, Republicans sought United States House of Representatives seats held by Democrats Sherrod Brown and Ted Strickland. The state legislature considered redrawing their districts. Critics allege the motivation was to aid in Republican victories. When Democrat Brown threatened to run for governor in 2002, if he lost his seat through redistricting, the legislature scrapped redistricting plans. Republican Governor Taft won re-election. Taft was challenged by Cuyahoga County commissioner Tim Hagan. Both Brown and Strickland held onto their congressional seats.

By 2004, Republicans held all six statewide executive offices (governor/lieutenant governor, attorney general, secretary of state, auditor, and treasurer), a two-thirds majority in the state senate and house, a 5–2 majority on the Supreme Court, both seats in the US Senate, and 12 of Ohio's 18 seats in the US House of Representatives. In 2006, Democrats began to retake some statewide offices. These include all of the executive offices except State Auditor (including the governorship going to Ted Strickland over Republican challenger J. Kenneth Blackwell) and one of the seats in the US Senate (Sherrod Brown defeating incumbent Mike DeWine).

Ohio Republicans still held ten seats in the US House of Representatives, one seat in the U.S. Senate, and a majority in both houses of the Ohio General Assembly. Between the election of Robert Cupp in 2007, the death of Chief Justice Thomas Moyer, and the appointment of Democrat Eric Brown in 2010, Republicans had controlled all seven seats on the Ohio Supreme Court previously.

In 2008, Democratic presidential candidate Barack Obama defeated Republican John McCain in Ohio.

In 2010, Republicans regained all of the statewide elected executive offices, including the governorship with the election of John Kasich, and regained the majority in the state House of Representatives and retaining the state Senate. Republicans also retained their seat in the U.S. Senate with the election of Rob Portman and retained a majority of the seats in the U.S. House of Representatives. In addition, 8th District Representative John Boehner was elected Speaker of the United States House of Representatives, making him third in line of succession (and the highest ranking Republican) to the Presidency of the United States.

In November 2011, Gov. John Kasich's law that limits public worker's union bargain abilities was voted down by the people of Ohio. This was a major blow to the platform that Gov. Kasich ran on in 2010.

=== Pro-Donald Trump turn ===
In 2017, Donald Trump helped to install Jane Timken as head of the Ohio Republican Party. When she left to run for the Senate, the Ohio Republican Party replaced her with former Trump Ohio campaign manager Bob Paduchik.

In 2021, the Ohio Republican Party called on Republican House Representative Anthony Gonzalez to resign after he voted to impeach former President Donald Trump for his role in inciting a pro-Trump mob to storm the U.S. Capitol. The party also voted to censure Gonzalez. The Cincinnati Enquirer wrote that the Ohio Republican Party "has increasingly become the party of Trump."

On December 1, 2023, the Ohio Republican Party became the first state Republican Party to endorse Donald Trump for president in 2024. The Cincinnati Enquirer wrote that the endorsement was "a rare move that underscores the former president's grip on state GOP officials."

Ohio GOP Chair Alex Triantafilou in January 2025 commented on Issue 1 on gerrymandering, where Triantafilou said that "we did our job" because "a lot" of voters were "confused by Issue 1", which means voters "don't know", thus Triantafilou concluded: "Confusing Ohioans was not such a bad strategy."

== Taft family political power ==
The Taft family has been one of the most powerful political families in American history. Robert Taft, Sr. was the first Taft to come to America, around the 1670s. The Ohio section of Tafts are descendants of Robert, Sr.

The start of the five generations of Taft's in politics was with Alphonso Taft. He was the founder of the Ohio political dynasty that is associated with the Republican Party. Alphonso was in President Ulysses S. Grant's Cabinet, first as Attorney General then as Secretary of War. He was later appointed US Ambassador to the Austria-Hungary Empire.

Three of Alphonso's sons entered into politics also, former US Representative of Ohio's 1st District Charles Phelps Taft, former US president and Chief Justice of the United States William Howard Taft, and former Republican Party Delegate Henry Waters Taft.

Both of William H. Taft's sons entered into politics. Robert A. Taft was a former US Senator and his other son Charles Phelps Taft II was former Mayor of Cincinnati. Both men were seen as great politicians.

The next generation of Taft politicians came from two of Robert's children. Robert Taft, Jr. served in both houses of the US Congress. His brother William Howard Taft III was Ambassador to Ireland.

The current generation of Tafts in politics are former Ohio Governor Bob Taft, son of Robert Taft Jr. William Howard Taft IV, son of William H. Taft III, has been an Ambassador to NATO and United States Deputy Secretary of Defense.

== Controversies ==
In 2005, the Republican fundraiser and coin dealer Thomas Noe ran a rare coin fund that the State of Ohio had invested $50 million in. Soon valuable coins came up missing and an investigation discovered Noe had taken around $13 million from the fund. He was convicted in 2006 and was sentenced to 18 years in state prison.

Noe was a top fundraiser for the George W. Bush campaign in Ohio in 2004, and the chairman for his campaign in Northwest Ohio. He was later convicted of making illegal contributions to the Bush campaign.

Noe had ties to then Governor Bob Taft. It was discovered through this scandal that the Governor and some of his top aides took improper gifts from Noe and other lobbyist. In 2005, Gov. Taft was charged with four misdemeanors related to these gifts.

This scandal had a negative effect on the Ohio Republican Party, who lost many seats in Congress after 2006 and the Governorship went to Ted Strickland. In 2008, Barack Obama won Ohio's 20 electoral college votes on his way to the presidency.

== Elected officials ==
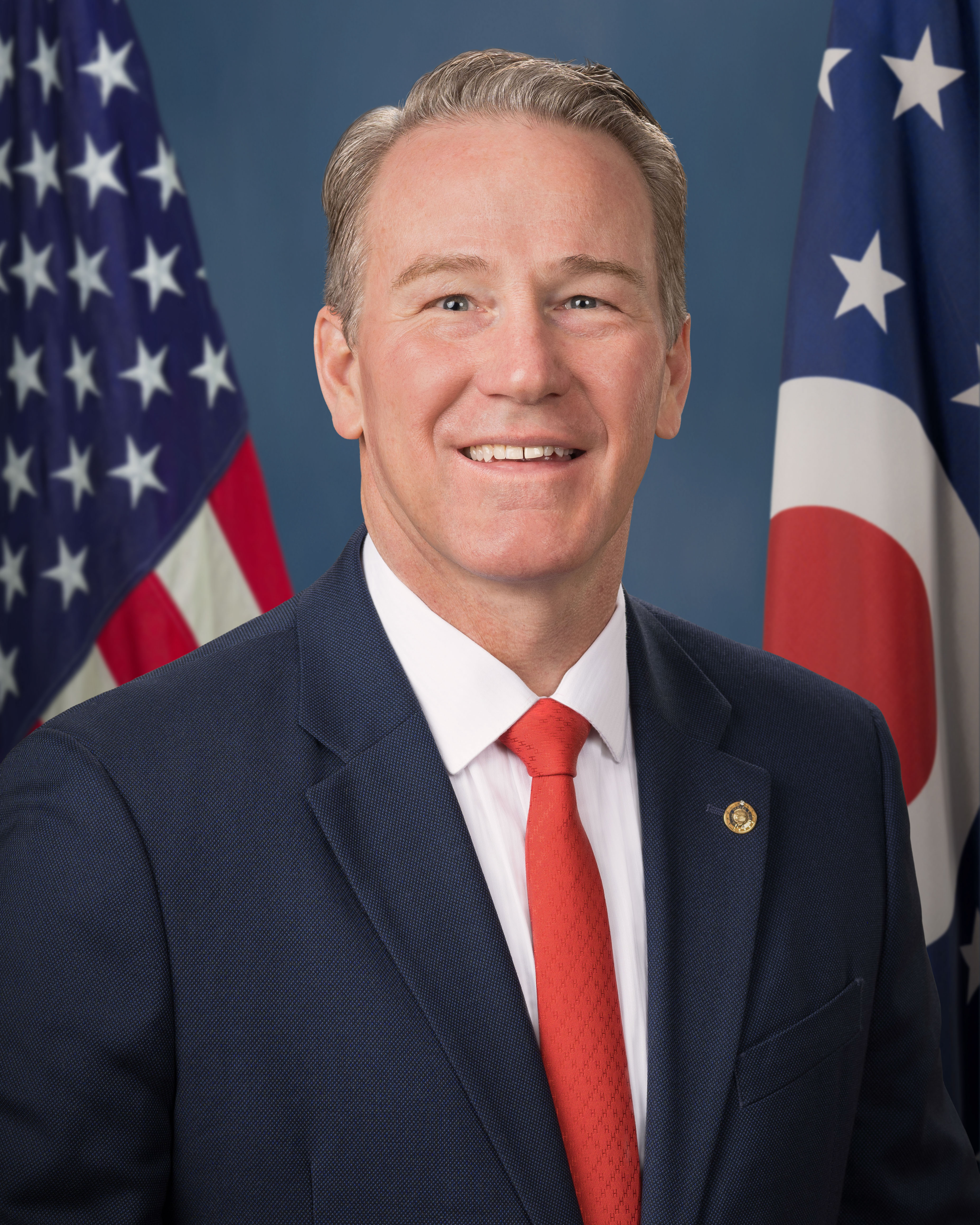
Senator Jon Husted

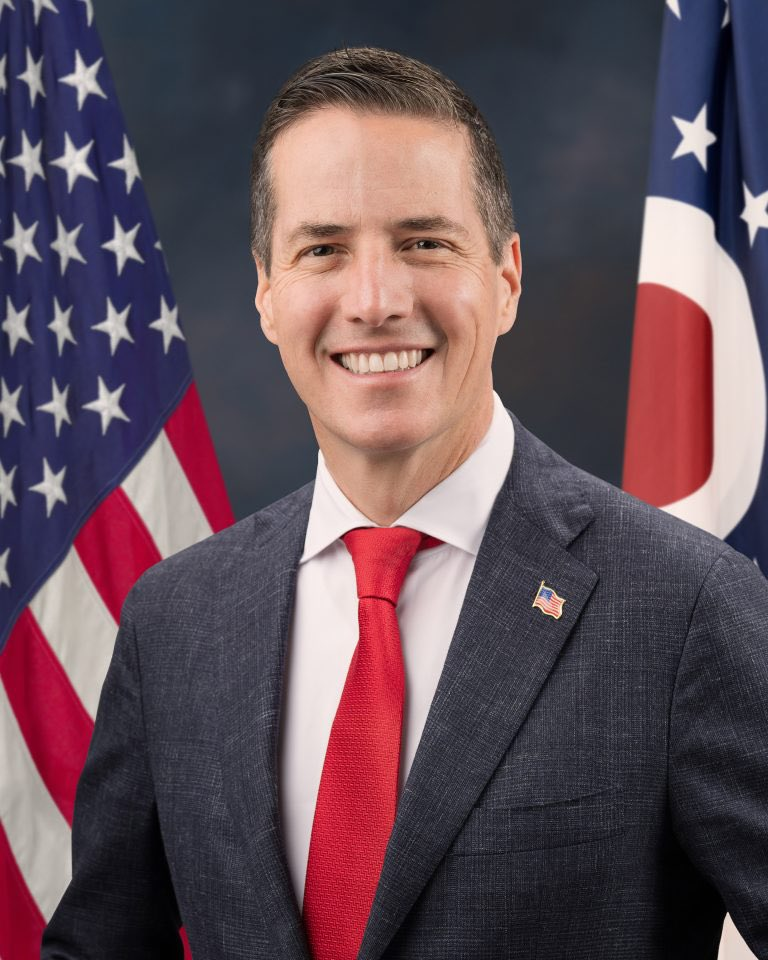
Senator Bernie Moreno

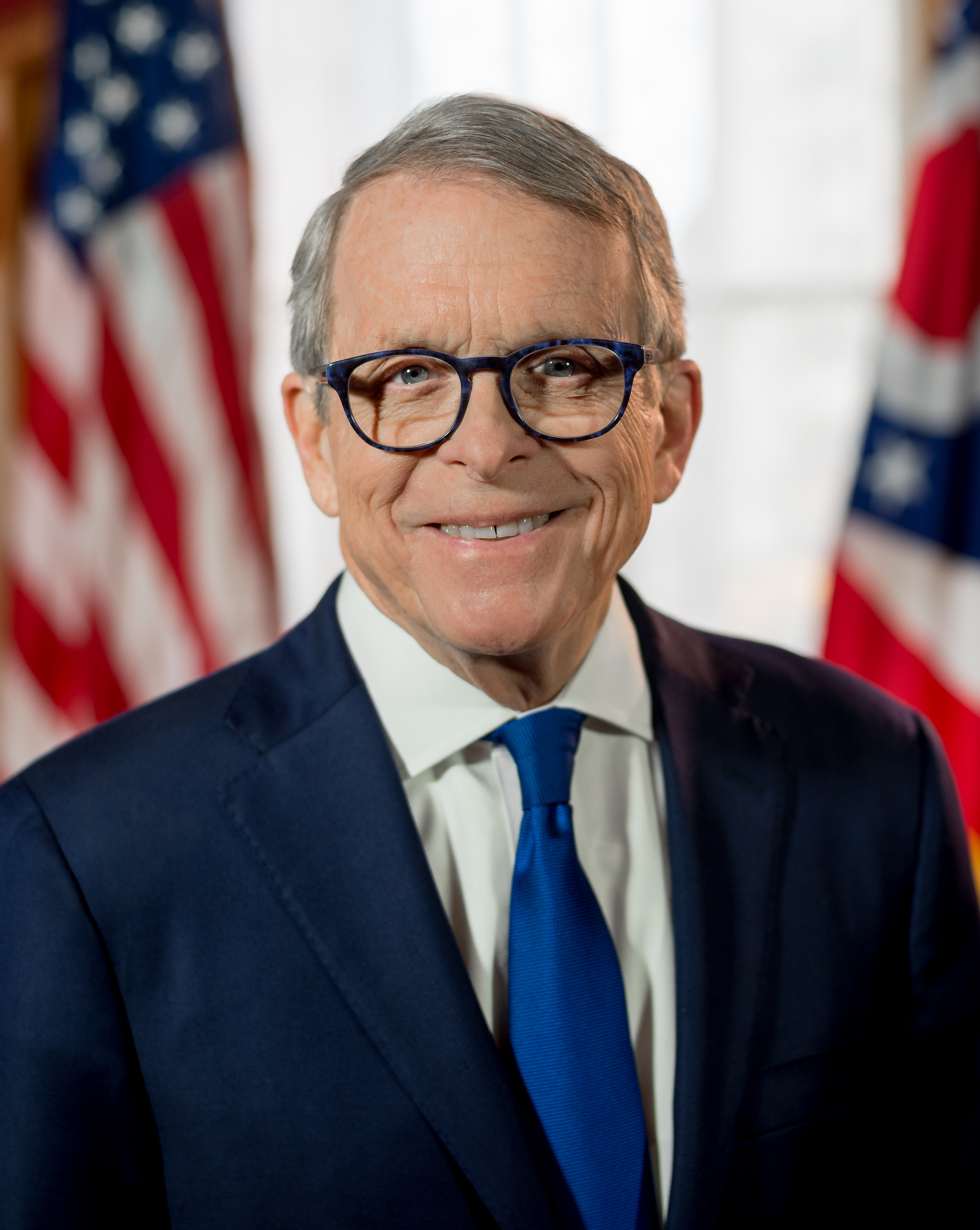
Governor Mike DeWine

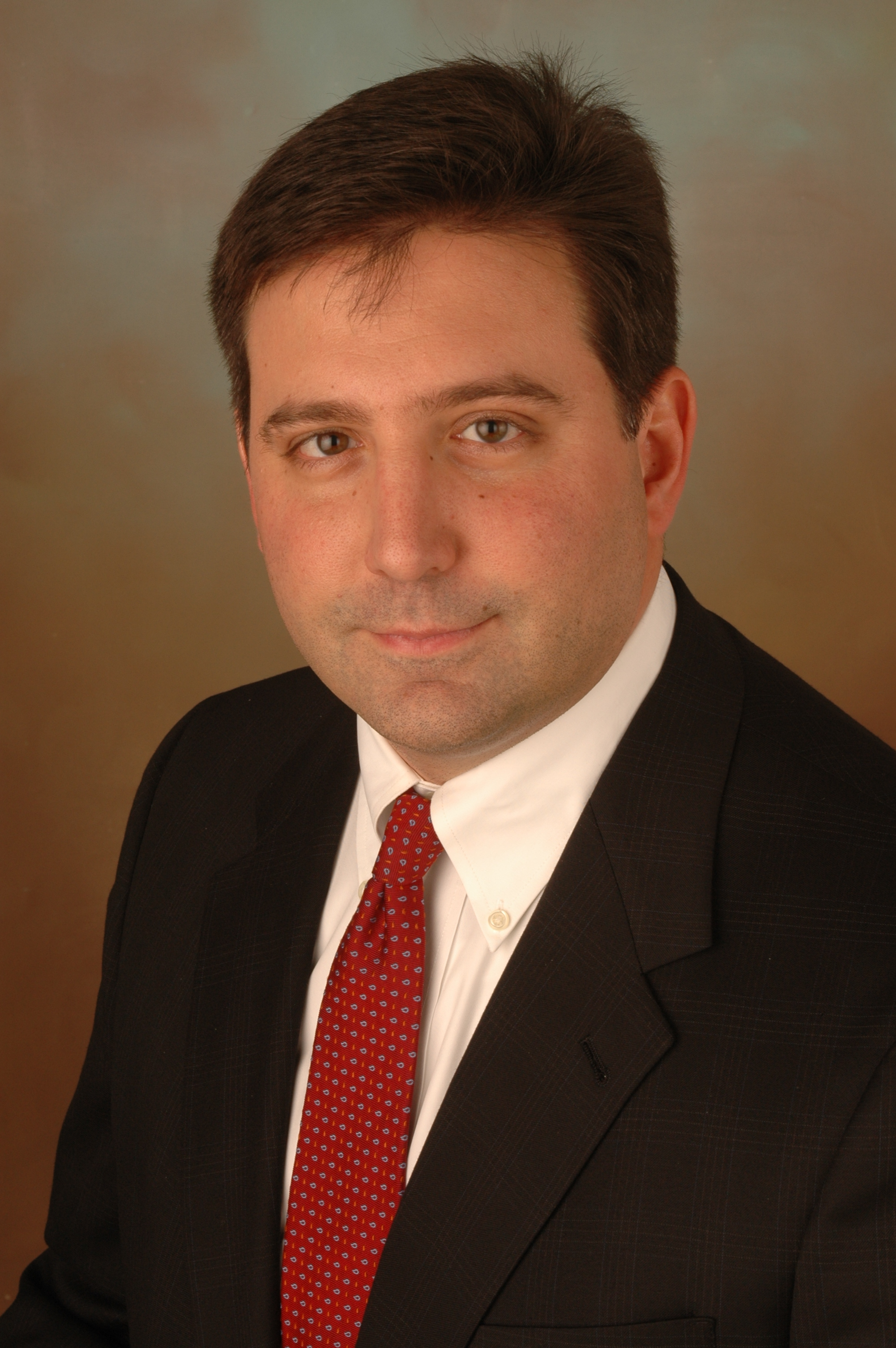
Ohio Republican Party Chairman Alex Triantafilou

=== Members of Congress ===
==== U.S. Senate ====
- Jon Husted
- Bernie Moreno

==== U.S. House of Representatives ====
District	Member	Photo
4th	David Taylor	
4th	Jim Jordan (House Minority Leader-designate)	
5th	Bob Latta	
6th	Michael Rulli	
7th	Max Miller	
8th	Warren Davidson	
10th	Mike Turner	
12th	Troy Balderson	
14th	David Joyce	
15th	Mike Carey	

=== Statewide offices ===
- Governor: Mike DeWine
- Lieutenant Governor: Jim Tressel
- Attorney General: Dave Yost
- Secretary of State: Frank LaRose
- State Treasurer: Robert Sprague
- State Auditor: Keith Faber

=== State legislative leaders ===
==== Ohio Senate ====
- President of the Senate: Rob McColley

==== Ohio House of Representatives ====
- Speaker of the House: Matt Huffman
- Majority Floor Leader: Marilyn John

=== State Supreme Court ===
- Chief Justice: Sharon L. Kennedy
- Associate Justices:

Patrick F. Fischer
Pat DeWine
Joe Deters
Daniel R. Hawkins
Megan E. Shanahan

=== Party leadership ===
- Chairman - Alex Triantafilou

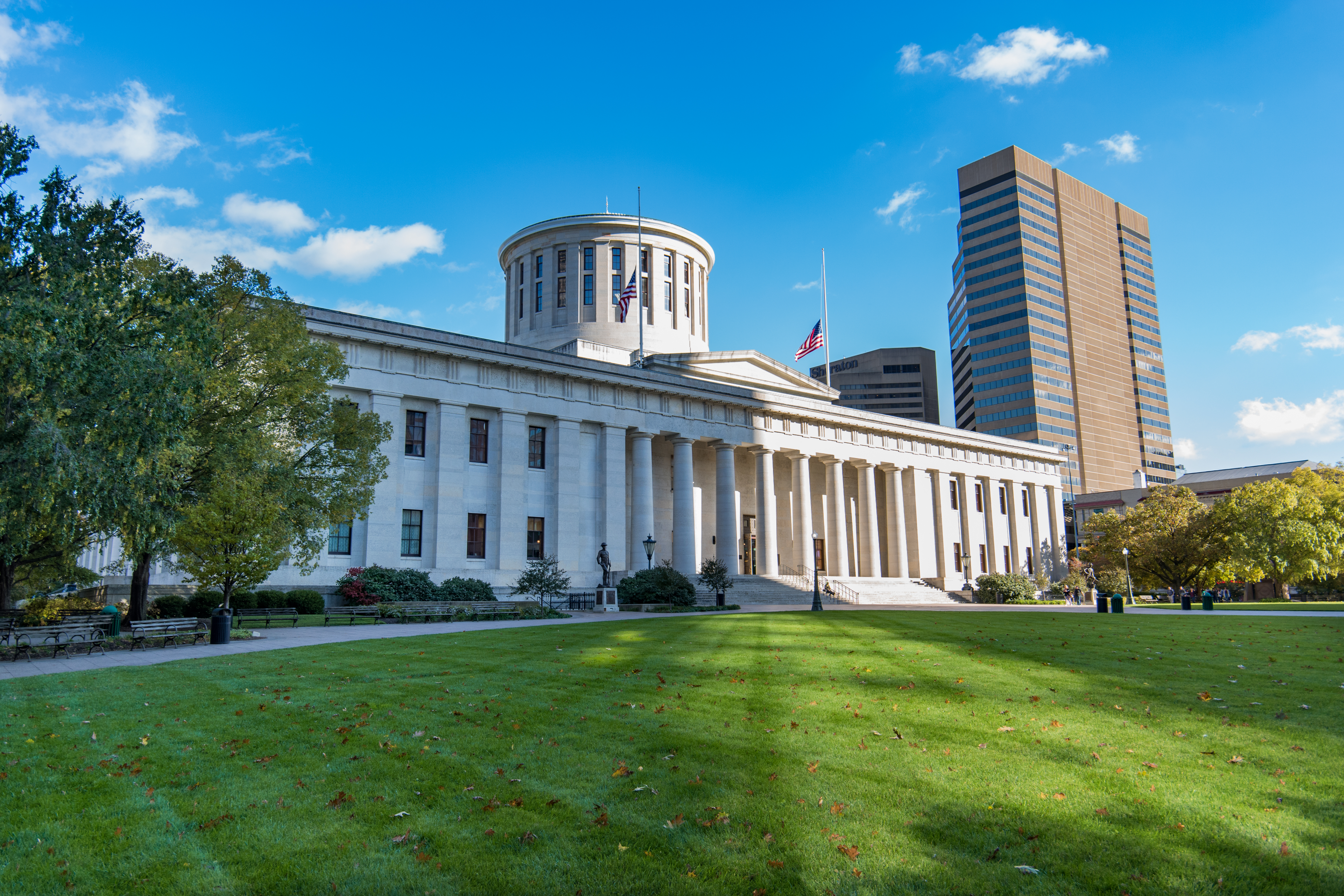
Ohio Statehouse

- Secretary - Tony J. Schroeder

== Notable Ohio Republicans ==
- Salmon P. Chase: US Senator, Governor of Ohio, United States Secretary of the Treasury, Chief Justice of the United States
- Charles William Foster, Jr.: US representative, Governor of Ohio, United States Secretary of the Treasury
- Rutherford B. Hayes: US representative, Governor of Ohio, President of the United States
- William McKinley: US Representative, Governor of Ohio, President of the United States
- William Dennison: Governor of Ohio, United States Postmaster General
- David Tod: Governor of Ohio, Ambassador to Brazil
- Jacob Dolson Cox: Governor of Ohio, United States Secretary of the Interior
- John W. Bricker: Ohio Attorney General, Governor of Ohio, US Senator, Republican nominee for Vice President of the United States
- Edward F. Noyes: Governor of Ohio, Ambassador to France
- Thomas L. Young: Governor of Ohio, US Representative
- Joseph B. Foraker: Governor of Ohio, US Senator
- George K. Nash: Ohio Attorney General, Governor of Ohio
- Frank B. Willis: Governor of Ohio, US Representative, US Senator
- C. William O'Neill: Ohio Attorney General, Governor of Ohio, Justice of the Ohio Supreme Court
- James A. Rhodes: mayor of Columbus, Ohio, Ohio State Auditor, Governor of Ohio, candidate for Republican nomination for President of the United States (1964, 1968), candidate for Republican nomination to the US Senate
- Warren G. Harding: US senator, Lieutenant Governor of Ohio, President of the United States
- Benjamin F. Wade: US Senator, a Radical Republican, President Pro Tempore of the United States Senate
- James A. Garfield: US Representative, President of the United States
- James Rudolph Garfield: United States Secretary of the Interior
- Ulysses S. Grant: commander of Union forces in the Civil War; President of the United States
- Benjamin Harrison: US Senator, President of the United States
- William H. Taft I: United States Secretary of War, President of the United States, Chief Justice of the United States
- William B. Saxbe: US Senator, US attorney general, ambassador to India
- John Sherman: US representative, United States Secretary of the Treasury, US Senator, chairman of the Senate Republican Conference, United States Secretary of State, author of the Sherman Antitrust Act
- Robert A. Taft I: Speaker of the Ohio House of Representatives, US Senator, chairman of the Senate Republican Conference, candidate for Republican nomination for President of the United States (1940, 1948, 1952)
- Harold H. Burton: Ohio State Representative, mayor of Cleveland, US Senator, Associate Justice of the Supreme Court of the United States
- Simeon D. Fess: US Representative, US Senator
- Nicholas Longworth: Speaker of the US House of Representatives
- Potter Stewart: Associate Justice of the United States Supreme Court
- Kingsley A. Taft: US Senator, Chief Justice of the Ohio Supreme Court
- Bob Taft: Governor of Ohio
- JD Vance: US Senator, Vice President of the United States
- George Voinovich: US Senator, Governor of Ohio, Lieutenant Governor of Ohio, Mayor of Cleveland
- John Kasich: Governor of Ohio, US Representative, and candidate for president in 2000 and 2016

== Party symbols ==
Ohio Republicans use the same symbols used by the national Republican Party, such as the elephant. The Ohio Republican Party logo features a white elephant silhouette over the shape of Ohio in red, with blue outlining its northern border.

== Electoral history ==
=== Gubernatorial ===
Ohio Republican Party gubernatorial election results
Election	Gubernatorial candidate	Votes	Vote %	Result
1994	George Voinovich	2,401,572	71.8%	Won ✓
1998	Bob Taft	1,678,721	50.0%	Won ✓
2002	Bob Taft	1,865,007	57.8%	Won ✓
2006	Ken Blackwell	1,474,285	36.65%	Lost ✗
2010	John Kasich	1,889,186	49.04%	Won ✓
2014	John Kasich	1,944,848	63.64%	Won ✓
2018	Mike DeWine	2,235,825	50.39%	Won ✓
2022	Mike DeWine	2,580,424	62.41%	Won ✓
2026	Vivek Ramaswamy	2,041,281	44.39%	Lost ✗

== See also ==
- Political party strength in Ohio
- Politics of Ohio
- List of United States representatives from Ohio
