= November 2023 Ohio Issue 1 =

Referendum to enshrine abortion and contraception in the state constitution

Issue 1
- November 7, 2023
- VA-6 VA-7 VA-7 VA-8 VA-9 VA-8 VA-9

Results
Choice	Votes	%
Yes	2,227,384	56.78%
No	1,695,480	43.22%
Total votes	3,922,864	100.00%
- Yes: 50–60% 60–70% 70–80% 80–90% No: 50–60% 60–70% 70–80% 80–90%

The 2023 Ohio reproductive rights initiative, officially titled "The Right to Reproductive Freedom with Protections for Health and Safety" and listed on the ballot as Issue 1, was a citizen-initiated constitutional amendment adopted on November 7, 2023, by a majority (56.8%) of voters. It codified reproductive rights in the Ohio Constitution, including contraception, fertility treatment, miscarriage care, and abortion up to the point of fetal viability, (Note: The referendum would allow an abortion ban after fetal viability, except when deemed necessary by a physician "to protect the pregnant patient's life or health".) restoring Roe v. Wade-era access to abortion in Ohio.

In 2019, the state legislature passed a six-week ban on abortion in Ohio, without exceptions for rape or incest. The statute became active after the Supreme Court of the United States held in Dobbs v. Jackson Women's Health Organization that the U.S. Constitution does not confer a right to abortion. While the ban was in place, multiple children fled the state seeking abortions after being raped. One such case involved a ten-year-old girl from Columbus, Ohio, who traveled to Indiana (where abortion was legal at the time) for the procedure, generating national attention and becoming a central campaign issue. A state court put the ban on hold while a challenge alleging it violated the Ohio Constitution was heard. Several members of the "no" campaign had called for bans on forms of birth control that prevent the implantation of a fertilized egg and in vitro fertilization if the initiative failed.

The "yes" campaign drew support from Ohio medical organizations, doctors, economists, trade unions, editorial boards, reproductive rights groups, and several religious organizations. They argued that a "yes" vote would further limited government, protect bodily autonomy and religious liberty, while preventing interference with patient-physician privacy. The American College of Obstetricians and Gynecology, alongside other professional associations of doctors, campaigned in favor of Issue 1. In August 2023, former President Donald Trump, who appointed three of the Supreme Court justices who voted to overturn Roe v. Wade, condemned six-week abortion bans, including Ohio's, as going "too far" and a "terrible mistake". Religious groups were generally divided on the issue. (Note: Several Catholic dioceses in Ohio also opposed the referendum. However, along with several dissenting Catholic organizations, many Catholic voters were expected to support Issue 1.)

Ohio's Issue 1 was the first time since the Dobbs decision that voters of a red state (Note: Ohio voted for Trump in both 2016 and 2020 by more than 8%.) were asked whether to enshrine abortion protections in their state constitution. (Note: Other Republican-leaning states had abortion-related referendums post-Dobbs, like Kansas and Kentucky, but they were questions on prohibiting abortion rights, not enshrining protections.) As such, the referendum's approval was widely interpreted as evidence for a national consensus in favor of broad abortion rights. Among those between 18 and 24 years old, an estimated 76% voted "yes" on Issue 1. Some conservative political analysts and commentators called a continued alliance with the anti-abortion movement "untenable" and an "electoral disaster", and urged the party to adopt a more pro-choice stance on the issue. Exit polling indicated that 61% of Ohioans agree that abortion should be legal in most or all cases, versus 37% who disagree.

== Text ==
Be it Resolved by the People of the State of Ohio that Article I of the Ohio Constitution is amended to add the following Section:

Article I, Section 22. The Right to Reproductive Freedom with Protections for Health and Safety

A. Every individual has a right to make and carry out one's own reproductive decisions, including, but not limited to, decisions on:

1. contraception;
2. fertility treatment;
3. continuing one's own pregnancy;
4. miscarriage care; and
5. abortion

B. The State shall not, directly or indirectly, burden, penalize, prohibit, interfere with, or discriminate against either:

1. An individual's voluntary exercise of this right or
2. A person or entity that assists an individual exercising this right,

unless the State demonstrates that it is using the least restrictive means to advance the individual's health in accordance with widely accepted and evidence-based standards of care.

However, abortion may be prohibited after fetal viability. But in no case may such an abortion be prohibited if, in the professional judgement of the pregnant patient's treating physician, it is necessary to protect the pregnant patient's life or health.

C. As used in this Section:

1. "Fetal viability" means "the point in a pregnancy when, in the professional judgement of the pregnant patient's treating physician, the fetus has a significant likelihood of survival outside the uterus with reasonable measures. This is determined on a case-by-case basis."
2. "State" includes any governmental entity and any political subdivision.

D. This Section is self-executing.

== Background ==
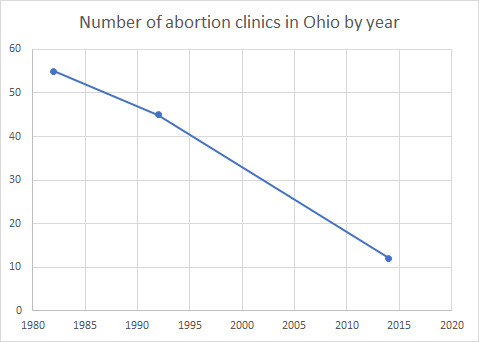
The number of abortion clinics in Ohio has substantially decreased.

=== Heartbeat bill ===
In April 2019, the Ohio legislature passed and Governor Mike DeWine signed a "heartbeat bill" that banned abortion after a fetal heartbeat can be detected, which usually occurs about six weeks after conception, before many know they are pregnant. The bill allowed exceptions for threats to the mother's life, but not for rape or incest. The statute was blocked by a federal judge in July 2019, a week before going into effect. It first became active three years later in July 2022, hours after the Supreme Court of the United States issued its decision in Dobbs v. Jackson Women's Health Organization. The Supreme Court ruled that the U.S. Constitution does not confer a right to abortion, overturning Roe v. Wade and allowing states to impose unlimited restrictions on abortion access. The statute was in effect for 82 days before a state court blocked it temporarily in September 2022, and ultimately blocked it indefinitely.

=== 2022 Ohio child-rape and Indiana abortion case ===
While the six-week abortion ban was in place, multiple children fled the state for abortions after being raped. The most notable case involved a ten-year-old girl from Columbus, Ohio, who traveled to Indiana on June 30, 2022, to get an abortion. Her case drew national attention and commentary from public figures, due in part to its proximity to the June 24, 2022, decision of the Supreme Court of the United States in Dobbs.

Her rapist was arrested by July 13. Before this arrest was made public, Ohio politicians who oppose legal abortion access called the story a hoax; Ohio Attorney General Dave Yost said, "Every day that goes by, the more likely that this is a fabrication." After news of the arrest validated the Star's story, these sources did not apologize for claiming the story was a hoax. Jim Bopp, the general counsel for the National Right to Life Committee, said in an interview that the child should have been legally forced to carry the pregnancy to full term and give birth, and that "She would have had the baby, and as many women who have had babies as a result of rape, we would hope that she would understand the reason and ultimately the benefit of having the child." In September 2022, shortly after Ohio's six-week abortion ban went into effect, a woman made national news when she almost bled to death after an Ohio hospital refused to treat her miscarriage.

=== National context ===
Since Roe v. Wade was overturned in 2022, voters supported the "pro-choice" side in state referendums along overwhelming and bipartisan margins. In November 2022, Ohio's neighbor Michigan held a similar referendum, called Proposal 3, which passed 57%–43%. While Michigan is considered a swing state, Ohio is socially conservative: Donald Trump won the state by 8% over Joe Biden in the 2020 presidential election. In other red states, voters rejected measures intending to restrict abortion, such as in the 2022 Kansas abortion referendum and 2022 Kentucky Amendment 2. Because Ohio's Issue 1 asked voters whether to explicitly protect abortion, it was widely expected to be a bellwether for the national opinion on abortion rights.

=== Ballot measure submission ===
On February 21, 2023, Ohioans for Reproductive Freedom, the group leading support for the initiative, filed the amendment's language with the office of Ohio Attorney General, Dave Yost, who certified it on March 2. The proposed amendment was then sent to the Ohio Ballot Board, which further certified it on March 13, permitting supporters to begin collecting signatures. On July 5, supporters filed 709,786 signatures, nearly 300,000 more than the minimum number required. The Ohio Secretary of State, Frank LaRose, certified the petition on July 25, 2023, after certifying 495,938 valid signatures, more than the approximately 410,000 required.

=== Attempt to change threshold ===
The Ohio Republican Party tried to increase the threshold required for referendum passage to 60%, in an attempt to thwart the proposed constitutional amendment. The threshold change was put to public vote in an August 8 special election, known as August 2023 Ohio Issue 1. Voters rejected the change 57%–43%, keeping the threshold for passage at a simple majority. It was defeated by a nearly identical margin to November 2023 Ohio Issue 1 passing three months later.

=== Rejected ballot challenge ===
On August 11, 2023, the Ohio Supreme Court unanimously rejected a lawsuit – filed by Republican former state Representative Tom Brinkman and 2022 Republican state representative candidate Jenn Giroux – that would keep the initiative off the ballot.

== Campaign ==
The campaign for the initiative drew support from Ohio scientific and medical communities, economists, trade unions, editorial boards, human rights, and many religious organizations. They argued that the initiative would limit government, protect bodily autonomy and religious liberty, and prevent interference with personal medical decisions, including another situation similar to the aforementioned abortion case. The American College of Obstetricians and Gynecologists, alongside other professional associations of physicians, campaigned for the citizen-initiated constitutional amendment. According to legal historian Mary Ziegler, "The main force behind the ballot initiative was physicians who said, 'We are not willing to practice medicine under this regime, and we think voters support us.'"

While several Ohio's Catholic dioceses condemned the measure, many Catholic voters were expected to vote for "yes", along with several dissenting groups, including Catholics for Choice.

=== Controversies ===
==== Comments by ORTL activist Lizzie Marbach ====
Lizzie Marbach
(@LizzieMarbach)
tweeted:

The use of birth control, IVF, & other unnatural means of "family planning" has brainwashed us into believing that WE are the authors of when life begins. This belief has caused so much evil and ultimately led to the death of over 60 million babies due to abortion.

September 11, 2023

Shortly before the election, there was a major rift within the Ohio Right to Life (ORTL) organization. The campaign suffered from intense infighting after comments made by Lizzie Marbach, the organization's communications director. Marbach called for restrictions or bans on birth control and in vitro fertilization (see tweet), after which she was fired in mid-August 2023. Over 60 million abortions had occurred since Roe v. Wade in 1973.

Marbach also described an image of the Virgin Mary in a Mexican Catholic church as "idolatry". Several Catholic anti-abortion activists urged opponents of the measure to not cast a ballot, or, cast one intentionally spoiled as a protest vote in the wake of the controversy, stating that the "against" campaign was furthering anti-Catholicism.

==== Ballot wording ====
Proponents of the amendment initially suggested that the amendment appear in full on voters' ballots in November. However, the Ohio Ballot Board substituted its own summary wording to appear before voters. The summary, written by Ohio Secretary of State and Republican Senate candidate Frank LaRose and approved by the Ballot Board's Republican majority, received criticism for its allegedly biased language, including opting for the phrase "unborn child" over the medically accurate term "fetus" and omitting reference to other rights the proposed amendment would protect, including contraception, miscarriage care, and fertility treatment. Abortion rights groups sued to have the full text of the amendment presented on the ballot, but the conservative majority on the Ohio Supreme Court sided with the Ballot Board, allowing the language to appear in the ballot summary.

The Ballot Board's summary received criticism from medical groups as well as some voices opposed to legal abortion access, who have described it as deliberately deceiving voters to vote "no" under false pretexts. Conservative columnist Jude Russo wrote, "We have failed to persuade the American people. Simply put: Lawyerly tricks (and tricky lawyers) are losers. Asking the commons to cede power voluntarily is a loser." The American College of Obstetricians and Gynecologists stated, "The language used to discuss abortion has a profound impact on how people form their opinions about reproductive health care, and the emotionally charged language that will now be presented to voters is neither clinically nor legally sound."

==== Misinformation ====
The Issue 1 election generated widespread misinformation. Several factors contributed to voter confusion, including back-to-back ballot questions, duplicate naming of ballot measures, reversed position of the ballot measures, controversy over ballot language, misleading terminology, and misinformation campaigns.

Republican lawmakers and anti-abortion groups – particularly American Policy Roundtable, Ohio Right to Life, and the Center for Christian Virtue – disseminated false claims that the amendment would allow unrestricted abortions up to birth and for minors to obtain abortions without parental consent, among other abortion misinformation. These misleading assertions were strategically spread through digital advertisements and offline events, as well as on a blog on the official Ohio Senate website, gaining prominence in search engine results for coming from a government source.

Advertisements from the "no" campaign claimed that the referendum would take away parental rights and force sex reassignment surgery on children. The claims received widespread criticism from legal experts, who described them as baseless and misleading. Constitutional law expert Jonathan Entin wrote:

If you drink too much alcohol, if you ingest certain drugs, if you drive too fast – all of those things could have shorter or longer term implications for your ability to reproduce... That doesn't mean that speed limits and drug laws and alcohol regulations are somehow going to be affected by this amendment if it's adopted.

Catholic anti-abortion columnist Mary Pezzulo criticized the advertisements for discussing parental rights while ignoring the anti-abortion movement's mission to "protect the lives of unborn babies". She wrote, "They're lying to get people to vote against Issue 1."

== Endorsements ==
Yes

U.S. Executive Branch officials

- Barack Obama, 44th President of the United States (2009–2017) (Democrat)
- Hillary Clinton, Secretary of State (2009–2013)

U.S. Senators

- Sherrod Brown, U.S. Senator from Ohio (2007–2025) (Democrat)

U.S. Representatives

- Joyce Beatty, U.S. Representative from OH-3 (2013–present) (Democrat)
- Shontel Brown, U.S. Representative from OH-11 (2021–present) (Democrat)
- Marcy Kaptur, U.S. Representative from OH-9 (1983–present) (Democrat)
- Greg Landsman, U.S. Representative from OH-1 (2023–present) (Democrat)
- Emilia Sykes, U.S. Representative from OH-13 (2023–present) (Democrat)

Statewide officials

- Marc Dann, 47th Attorney General of Ohio (2007–2008) (Democrat)

State Senators

- Paula Hicks-Hudson, state senator from the 11th district (2023–present), former state representative from the 44th district (2019–2022), and 63rd Mayor of Toledo (2015–2018) (Democrat)
- Nina Turner, President of Our Revolution and former state senator from the 25th district (2008–2014) (Democrat)

State House members

- Willis Blackshear, Jr., state representative from the 38th district (2021–present) (Democrat)
- Jeffrey Crossman, former state representative from the 15th district (2019–2022) and Democratic nominee in the 2022 Ohio Attorney General election (Democrat)
- Michele Grim, state representative from the 43rd district (2023–present) (Democrat)
- Darrell Opfer, former state representative from the 53rd district (1993–1999) (Democrat)
- Allison Russo, Minority Leader of the Ohio House of Representatives (2022–present) and state representative from the 7th district (2023–present) and the 24th district (2019–2022) (Democrat)
- Anita Somani, state representative from the 11th district (2023–present) (Democrat)
- Casey Weinstein, state representative from the 34th district (2019–present) (Democrat)

Local officials

- Justin Bibb, 58th Mayor of Cleveland (2022–present) (Democrat)

Individuals

- Traci D. Blackmon, Associate General Minister of Justice and Local Church Ministries for the United Church of Christ
- Michael Bloomberg, majority owner and co-founder of Bloomberg L.P., 108th Mayor of New York City (2002–2013)
- Connie Schultz, writer, journalist, and educator
- Mini Timmaraju, attorney, reproductive rights advocate, and president of Reproductive Freedom for All
- Elizabeth Walters, chair of the Ohio Democratic Party

Organizations

- American Civil Liberties Union
- Bend the Arc
- Fairness Project
- Feminist Majority Foundation
- Freedom From Religion Foundation
- Green Party of Ohio
- Human Rights Campaign
- National Association of Social Workers
- Ohio Democratic Party
- Planned Parenthood
- Reproductive Freedom for All
- Sixteen Thirty Fund
- Swing Left
- United Church of Christ

Newspapers

- The Columbus Dispatch
- The Oberlin Review
No

U.S. Executive Branch officials

- Mike Pence, 48th Vice President of the United States (2017–2021) (Republican)

U.S. Senators

- JD Vance, U.S. Senator from Ohio (2023–present) (Republican)

U.S. Representatives

- Max Miller, U.S. Representative from OH-7 (2023–present) (Republican)

Statewide officials

- Ken Blackwell, 48th Secretary of State of Ohio (1999–2007) and 43rd Treasurer of Ohio (1994–1999) (Republican)
- Mike DeWine, 70th Governor of Ohio (2019–present), 50th Attorney General of Ohio (2011–2019), former U.S. Senator from Ohio (1995–2007), 59th Lieutenant Governor of Ohio (1991–1994), and former U.S. Representative from OH-7 (1983–1991) (Republican)
- Keith Faber, 33rd Auditor of Ohio (2019–present) (Republican)
- Jon Husted, 66th Lieutenant Governor of Ohio (2019–present) and 50th Secretary of State of Ohio (2011–2019) (Republican)
- Frank LaRose, 51st Secretary of State of Ohio (2019–present) (Republican)
- Dave Yost, 51st Attorney General of Ohio (2019–present) and 32nd Auditor of Ohio (2011–2019) (Republican)

State Senators

- Matt Dolan, state senator from the 24th district (2017–present) and former state representative from the 98th district (2005–2010) (Republican)
- Theresa Gavarone, state senator from the 2nd district (2019–present) and former state representative from the 3rd district (2016–2019) (Republican)
- Michele Reynolds, state senator from the 3rd district (2023–present) (Republican)
- Kristina Roegner, state senator from the 27th district (2019–present) and former state representative from the 37th district (2011–2018) (Republican)

State House members

- Adam Bird, state representative from the 63rd district (2023–present) and the 66th district (2021–2022) (Republican)
- Gary Click, state representative from the 88th district (2021–present) (Republican)
- Jim Hoops, state representative from the 81st district (2018–present; 1999–2006) (Republican)
- Melanie Miller, state representative from the 67th district (2023–present) (Republican)
- Bill Seitz, Majority Leader of the Ohio House of Representatives (2017–present), state representative from the 30th district (2017–present; 2001–2007), and former state senator from the 8th district (2007–2016) (Republican)
- Jason Stephens, 106th Speaker of the Ohio House of Representatives (2023–present) and state representative from the 93rd district (2019–present) (Republican)

Local officials

- Peggy Lehner, Mayor of Kettering, former state senator from the 6th district (2011–2020; 2008) and former state representative from the 37th district (2009–2011) (Republican)

Individuals

- David Bonnar, Bishop of Youngstown
- Earl K. Fernandes, Bishop of Columbus
- Edward C. Malesic, Bishop of Cleveland
- Dennis Marion Schnurr, Archbishop of Cincinnati
- Michael W. Smith, musician
- Daniel Edward Thomas, Bishop of Toledo
- Alex Triantafilou, chair of the Ohio Republican Party

Organizations

- Catholic Conference of Ohio
- Center for Christian Virtue
- Knights of Columbus
- Ohio Republican Party
- Ohio Right to Life
- Susan B. Anthony Pro-Life America

Newspapers

- The Blade
Declined to endorse

Newspapers

- Akron Beacon Journal
- The Plain Dealer

== Polling ==
Poll source	Date(s) administered	Sample size (Note: Key: A – all adults RV – registered voters LV – likely voters V – unclear)	Margin of error	For	Against	Undecided
Data for Progress	October 31–November 2, 2023	582 (LV)	± 4%	57%	40%	3%
Ohio Northern University	October 16–19, 2023	668 (RV)	± 3.8%	60%	40%	-
Baldwin Wallace University Community Research Institute	October 9–11, 2023	569 (RV)	± 4.5%	58%	34%	8%
Fallon Research & Communications, Inc.	August 22–25, 2023	501 (RV)	± 4.37%	55%	35%	10%
Ohio Northern University	July 17–26, 2023	675 (LV)	± 3.7%	54%	30%	16%
USA Today/Suffolk University	July 9–12, 2023	500 (LV)	± 4.4%	58%	32%	10%
Scripps News/YouGov	June 20–22, 2023	500 (LV)	± 5.95%	58%	23%	20%
Baldwin Wallace University Community Research Institute	September 30–October 3, 2022	856 (RV)	± 2.8%	59%	27%	14%

== Financial contributions ==
Campaign Committees
Committee	Position	Contributions	Expenditures (Note: Some portion of each committee's expenditures may have gone to the August 2023 Ohio Issue 1.)
Ohioans United for Reproductive Rights	Support	$42,500,000	$42,400,000
Protect Women Ohio	Oppose	$30,400,000	$30,800,000
Ohioans for Reproductive Freedom PAC	Support	$8,900,000	$8,700,000
Protect Women Ohio Action	Oppose	$5,700,000	$5,700,000
Ohio Physicians for Reproductive Rights PAC	Support	$2,300,000	$2,300,000

Major Donors to Registered Committees
Donors	Position	Contributions
The Concord Fund/Judicial Crisis Network	Oppose	$25,000,000
Susan B. Anthony Pro-Life America	Oppose	$12,500,000
Protect Women Ohio Action	Oppose	$9,700,000
Sixteen Thirty Fund	Support	$5,500,000
Open Society Policy Center	Support	$3,500,000
Catholic Dioceses of Ohio	Oppose	$2,200,000
American Civil Liberties Union	Support	$2,200,000
Fairness Project	Support	$2,400,000
Lynn Schusterman	Support	$1,500,000
Planned Parenthood Action Fund	Support	$1,500,000
Knights of Columbus	Oppose	$1,000,000
Michael Bloomberg	Support	$1,000,000
Gwendolyn Sontheim Meyer	Support	$1,000,000
Abigail Wexner	Support	$1,000,000

== Results ==
Yes received 56.78% of the vote, compared to 43.22% of the vote for No, a margin of 13.56%.

=== Results by county ===
Breakdown of voting by county
County	Yes	Votes	No	Votes
Adams	31.6%	2,443	68.4%	5,287
Allen	35.4%	10,978	64.6%	20,029
Ashland	42.0%	7,655	58.0%	10,573
Ashtabula	54.5%	16,569	45.5%	13,841
Athens	72.6%	13,515	27.4%	5,112
Auglaize	26.6%	4,688	73.4%	12,915
Belmont	40.5%	7,645	59.5%	11,252
Brown	36.1%	4,852	63.9%	8,578
Butler	50.8%	59,150	49.2%	57,305
Carroll	39.3%	3,630	60.7%	5,609
Champaign	41.4%	5,601	58.6%	7,936
Clark	50.6%	20,870	49.4%	20,373
Clermont	48.3%	36,208	51.7%	38,753
Clinton	40.1%	5,350	59.9%	7,995
Columbiana	43.9%	14,132	56.1%	18,040
Coshocton	47.4%	5,228	52.6%	5,813
Crawford	40.0%	5,184	60.0%	7,761
Cuyahoga	74.4%	295,406	25.6%	101,555
Darke	27.6%	5,016	72.4%	13,146
Defiance	38.9%	4,966	61.1%	7,810
Delaware	59.3%	57,116	40.7%	39,195
Erie	57.1%	16,085	42.9%	12,093
Fairfield	51.4%	28,410	48.6%	26,818
Fayette	40.7%	3,303	59.3%	4,814
Franklin	72.9%	308,379	27.1%	114,637
Fulton	38.6%	5,935	61.4%	9,424
Gallia	31.6%	2,373	68.4%	5,139
Geauga	54.7%	22,327	45.3%	18,503
Greene	49.3%	30,635	50.7%	31,507
Guernsey	46.8%	5,288	53.2%	6,005
Hamilton	65.1%	186,175	34.9%	99,819
Hancock	40.3%	10,552	59.7%	15,621
Hardin	41.3%	3,408	58.7%	4,843
Harrison	38.0%	1,741	62.0%	2,839
Henry	35.6%	3,507	64.4%	6,347
Highland	33.7%	4,005	66.3%	7,880
Hocking	47.8%	4,287	52.2%	4,674
Holmes	24.6%	2,156	75.4%	6,599
Huron	44.1%	7,922	55.9%	10,055
Jackson	37.6%	3,117	62.4%	5,178
Jefferson	40.7%	8,090	59.3%	11,808
Knox	42.1%	9,384	57.9%	12,898
Lake	60.5%	54,337	39.5%	35,504
Lawrence	33.9%	5,647	66.1%	11,002
Licking	50.9%	31,815	49.1%	30,748
Logan	37.4%	5,824	62.6%	9,736
Lorain	62.6%	69,097	37.4%	41,315
Lucas	63.9%	76,197	36.1%	43,012
Madison	46.8%	6,487	53.2%	7,364
Mahoning	56.3%	42,604	43.7%	33,015
Marion	49.5%	9,325	50.5%	9,519
Medina	55.2%	41,006	44.8%	33,242
Meigs	36.1%	2,366	63.9%	4,179
Mercer	21.5%	3,796	78.5%	13,850
Miami	39.6%	15,932	60.4%	24,258
Monroe	32.6%	1,355	67.4%	2,797
Montgomery	59.3%	100,475	40.7%	69,021
Morgan	42.3%	1,933	57.7%	2,641
Morrow	39.9%	5,209	60.1%	7,860
Muskingum	46.2%	11,620	53.8%	13,522
Noble	36.1%	1,494	63.9%	2,646
Ottawa	52.9%	9,061	47.1%	8,056
Paulding	28.9%	1,824	71.1%	4,480
Perry	42.0%	4,759	58.0%	6,560
Pickaway	44.8%	8,490	55.2%	10,461
Pike	39.2%	2,957	60.8%	4,594
Portage	60.9%	35,147	39.1%	22,547
Preble	37.0%	5,226	63.0%	8,913
Putnam	16.8%	2,430	83.2%	12,051
Richland	42.6%	17,124	57.4%	23,050
Ross	48.4%	10,372	51.6%	11,068
Sandusky	45.4%	9,270	54.6%	11,142
Scioto	36.7%	6,566	63.3%	11,321
Seneca	40.2%	7,179	59.8%	10,692
Shelby	24.3%	4,274	75.7%	13,316
Stark	53.3%	67,949	46.7%	59,629
Summit	65.5%	126,531	34.5%	66,755
Trumbull	57.4%	37,093	42.6%	27,495
Tuscarawas	46.3%	13,219	53.7%	15,319
Union	51.0%	13,209	49.0%	12,706
Van Wert	29.0%	2,809	71.0%	6,864
Vinton	37.6%	1,283	62.4%	2,127
Warren	47.5%	43,463	52.5%	47,963
Washington	40.6%	8,022	59.4%	11,715
Wayne	42.4%	15,911	57.6%	21,589
Williams	36.9%	4,481	63.1%	7,658
Wood	55.2%	25,929	44.8%	21,037
Wyandot	38.7%	3,006	61.3%	4,762

=== Results by congressional district ===
"Yes" won nine of 15 congressional districts, including four that were represented by Republicans.

District	Yes	No	Representative
1st	63%	37%	Greg Landsman
2nd	42%	58%	Brad Wenstrup
3rd	76%	24%	Joyce Beatty
4th	46%	54%	Jim Jordan
5th	47%	53%	Bob Latta
6th	47%	53%	Bill Johnson
7th	59%	41%	Max Miller
8th	49%	51%	Warren Davidson
9th	56%	44%	Marcy Kaptur
10th	57%	43%	Mike Turner
11th	83%	17%	Shontel Brown
12th	49.6%	50.4%	Troy Balderson
13th	62%	38%	Emilia Sykes
14th	58%	42%	David Joyce
15th	59%	41%	Mike Carey

== Reactions ==
Within a day of the close of polling, Ohio's top Republican legislative leaders suggested that action would be taken against the new abortion rights granted by Issue 1. Ohio Republican House Speaker Jason Stephens said that Issue 1 is "not the end of the conversation" because there are "multiple paths that we will explore to continue to protect innocent life". A spokesperson for Ohio Senate President Matt Huffman reacted to the result: "This isn't the end. It is really just the beginning of a revolving door of ballot campaigns to repeal or replace Issue 1."

Two days after the result, Ohio State Representatives Jennifer Gross, Bill Dean, Melanie Miller, and Beth Lear, all Republicans, released a statement calling Issue 1 "deceptive", declaring that "Ohio legislators will consider removing jurisdiction from the judiciary over this ambiguous ballot initiative", so that only Ohio legislators can "consider what, if any, modifications to make to existing laws", instead of Ohio courts.

Rick Santorum, a Republican and former U.S. Senator, commented on the simultaneous passage of Issue 1 and Issue 2, the latter of which legalized recreational marijuana: "You put very sexy things like abortion and marijuana on the ballot, and a lot of young people come out and vote. It was a secret sauce for disaster in Ohio ... pure democracies are not the way to run a country." Conservative commentator Sean Hannity urged Republicans to adopt a "safe, legal, and rare" framework on abortion.

According to Jessie Hill, professor and associate dean at Case Western Reserve University School of Law, the only way the Issue 1 amendment could be challenged is if there were a change to federal law regarding abortion or if another Ohio constitutional amendment restricting abortion was passed, which would require a majority vote in an election.

On December 15, 2023, the Ohio Supreme Court dismissed the state of Ohio's challenge to a lower court ruling from Hamilton County which stayed Ohio's six-week abortion ban. In March 2023, the Ohio Supreme Court agreed to review the matter following a challenge from the state. However, following the passage of Issue 1, the Ohio Supreme Court dismissed the matter, citing a change in the law.

== Voter demographics ==
The biggest demographic divides were marital status, race, and education, not gender.

According to the exit poll, married men opposed legal abortion, and married women only slightly supported legal abortion. Unmarried men strongly supported legal abortion, much more than married women and nearly as much as unmarried women. Unmarried women supported legal abortion the most.

Black and Latino voters were much more likely than White voters to support legal abortion. White evangelicals most strongly opposed legal abortion.

Voters who never attended college opposed legal abortion, while those with advanced degrees strongly supported it. Voters with an Associate’s degree, some college, or a Bachelor’s degree were moderately in favor.

=== Exit poll ===
Ohio Issue 1 vote by demographic subgroup
Demographic subgroup	Yes	No	% of total vote
Total vote	56.78	43.22	100
Age
18–29 years old	77	23	12
30–44 years old	68	32	23
45–64 years old	53	47	35
65+ years old	45	55	30
Party ID
Democrat	92	8	32
Republican	18	82	35
Independent	64	36	33
Ideology
Liberal	94	6	34
Moderate	69	31	30
Conservative	13	87	36
Marital Status
Married	51	49	61
Unmarried	67	33	39
Gender by marital status
Married men	48	52	30
Married women	53	47	31
Unmarried men	64	36	17
Unmarried women	69	31	22
Married With Children?
Yes	56	44	22
No	57	43	77
Race
White	53	47	85
Black	83	17	10
Latino	73	27	3
Asian	N/A	N/A	1
Other	N/A	N/A	1
Gender
Male	53	47	47
Female	60	40	53
Area Type
Urban	70	30	40
Suburban	52	48	43
Rural	40	60	18
Abortion Should Be
Legal In All Cases	96	4	28
Legal In Most Cases	83	17	33
Illegal In Most Cases	6	94	25
Illegal In All Cases	3	97	12
White Born-Again or Evangelical Christian
Yes	24	76	30
No	71	29	70
Parents
Men With Children	53	47	14
Women With Children	62	38	16
Men Without Children	54	46	33
Women Without Children	59	41	37
Education
Never Attended College	42	58	18
Some College	60	40	23
Associate degree	54	46	14
Bachelor's Degree	58	42	25
Advanced Degree	68	32	19
Union Household
Yes	58	42	30
No	57	43	70
Feelings About Roe Being Overturned
Enthusiastic	7	93	18
Satisfied	21	79	18
Dissatisfied	68	32	22
Angry	93	7	38
2020 Presidential Vote
Biden	92	8	45
Trump	19	81	43
Another Candidate	65	35	5
Did Not Vote	71	29	4
Biden Approval
Strongly Approve	94	6	15
Somewhat Approve	91	9	24
Somewhat Disapprove	72	28	13
Strongly Disapprove	23	77	46

== See also ==
- 2023 Ohio Issue 2
- Abortion in Ohio
- Initiatives and referendums in the United States

=== Other abortion referendums ===
- 2022 Kansas abortion referendum
- 2022 California Proposition 1
- 2022 Michigan Proposal 3
- 2022 Vermont Proposal 5
- 2024 Arizona Proposition 139
- 2024 Colorado Amendment 79
- 2024 Florida Amendment 4
- 2024 Maryland Question 1
- 2024 Missouri Amendment 3
- 2024 Montana Initiative 128
- 2024 Nebraska Initiative 439
- 2024 Nevada Question 6
- 2024 New York Proposal 1
- 2024 South Dakota Amendment G
- 2026 Idaho Proposition 1
- 2026 Missouri Amendment 3
- 2026 Nevada Question 6
- 2026 Virginia Question 1
