= Abortion in Ohio =

November 2023 Ohio Issue 1 results map by county

Abortion in Ohio is legal on request up to the point of fetal viability (roughly 22 weeks) as a result of abortion rights being placed into the Ohio State Constitution by November 2023 Ohio Issue 1, adopted by 57% of voters.

Planned Parenthood and the ACLU are advocating in court to have other pre-amendment restrictions nullified, such as a 24-hour waiting period, laws prohibiting advanced practice nurses and similar healthcare providers from prescribing abortion medications, and a law prohibiting the prescription of mifepristone (which is commonly used for medication abortion) for any off-label use.

== Current Ohio law ==
Due to November 2023 Ohio Issue 1, abortions up to fetal viability are legal in Ohio. Ohio has multiple layers of law on abortion, resulting from multiple laws passed over the decades. However, abortion proponents argue in ongoing litigation that these laws are no longer enforceable.

A "heartbeat bill" that banned abortions after six weeks of gestational age was enacted before Issue 1 was challenged in court, with the Attorney General of Ohio and other Republican leaders in Ohio defending it in court. The six-week abortion ban was struck down by an Ohio judge in October 2024.

=== Laws no longer enforceable ===
On April 11, 2019, Ohio Governor Mike DeWine signed the Human Rights and Heartbeat Protection Act, which banned abortion in Ohio after any embryonic cardiac activity is detected. No exceptions were made for rape, incest or fetal inviability; the only exception, according to ORC 2919.193(B), is a medical emergency, defined in 2919.16(F) & (K) as "serious risk of the substantial and irreversible impairment of a major bodily function of the pregnant woman."

Included in this law, ORC 2919.198, was a section called "Immunity of pregnant woman." This section overrides penalties for pregnant women who undertake an abortion after embryonic cardiac activity had been detected. This release of penalties did not extend to physicians or doctors who administered the abortion past detectable cardiac activity.

The law only went into effect on June 24, 2022, after the Supreme Court of the United States overturned Roe v. Wade. On October 7, a judge granted a motion for preliminary injunction against the abortion bans. The decision meant abortions through 22 weeks gestation could continue, in keeping with state law in place before the ban.

== Context ==
According to a 2017 report from the Center for Reproductive Rights and Ibis Reproductive Health, states that tried to pass additional constraints on a woman's ability to access legal abortions had fewer policies supporting women's health, maternal health and children's health. These states also tended to resist expanding Medicaid, family leave, medical leave, and sex education in public schools. According to Megan Donovan, a senior policy manager at the Guttmacher Institute, states with legislation that protects a woman's right to access abortion services have the lowest rates of infant mortality in the United States. In 2017, Georgia, Ohio, Missouri, Louisiana, Alabama and Mississippi had among the highest rates of infant mortality in the United States. In 2017, Ohio had an infant mortality rate of 7.2 deaths per 1,000 live births.

In the 2022 Ohio child-rape and Indiana abortion case a ten-year-old girl from Columbus, Ohio traveled to Indiana to get an abortion because the 6-week abortion ban passed did not provide an exception for those who became pregnant because of rape. This includes those who are children or are otherwise minors. Her case drew national attention and commentary from public figures, due in part to its proximity to the June 24, 2022, decision of the Supreme Court of the United States in Dobbs v. Jackson Women's Health Organization, which overturned Roe v. Wade and allowed states, including Ohio, to impose unlimited limitations on abortion access.

In September 2022, shortly after Ohio's 6-week abortion ban went into effect, a woman made national news when she almost bled to death after an Ohio hospital refused to treat her miscarriage. In late September 2022, abortion providers filed affidavits in Cincinnati as part of a lawsuit aimed at stopping enforcement of the 6-week abortion ban. The affidavits detailed instances of minors who had been sexually assaulted having to leave the state to obtain abortions, several women who threatened suicide or self-harm because of the inability to receive an abortion, and women with cancer who were refused abortions and could not receive cancer treatment while pregnant.

In the year following the overturn of Roe v. Wade in 2022, 210 pregnant women in a dozen states were criminally charged for conduct associated with their pregnancy, pregnancy loss or birth. Six states — Alabama, Mississippi, Ohio, Oklahoma, South Carolina and Texas — accounted for most cases.

In September 2023, 34 year old Brittany Watts of Warren, Ohio was arrested after having a miscarriage at home and was charged with "abusing a corpse". An Ohio grand jury later dismissed the charges.

== History ==
=== Legislative history ===
By the end of the 1800s, all states in the Union except Louisiana had therapeutic exceptions in their legislative bans on abortions. In 1978, Akron, Ohio, passed a city ordinance that restricted abortion rights.

The state was one of 23 states in 2007 to have a detailed abortion-specific informed consent requirement. Mississippi, Nebraska, North Dakota and Ohio all had statutes in 2007 that required specific informed consent on abortion but also, by statute, allowed medical doctors performing abortions to disassociate themselves with the anti-abortion materials they were required to provide to their female patients. The Ohio legislature was one of five states nationwide that tried, and failed, to pass a "fetal heartbeat" bill in 2013. Only North Dakota successfully passed such a law, but it was later struck down by the courts. They tried with this type of legislation again unsuccessfully in 2018.

Among those who believe that abortion is murder, some believe it may be appropriate to punish it with death. While attempts to criminalize abortion generally focus on the doctor, Texas state Rep. Tony Tinderholt (R) introduced a bill in 2017 and 2019 that may enable the death penalty in Texas for women who have abortions, and the Ohio legislature considered a similar bill in 2018.

In Ohio, a "fetal heartbeat" law, HB 125, was introduced in the state legislature in October 2011. It was the only state in the country to try to pass such legislation that year. The bill was shelved by the Republican majority Senate to avoid controversy. This bill was notably supported by John C. Willke. A related law was signed in Ohio in 2013 by Governor John Kasich, which mandates, among other things, that doctors who do not test for embryonic cardiac activity when a patient seeks an abortion, tell the patient in writing if there is embryonic cardiac activity, and then tell them the statistical likelihood that the fetus could be carried to term, are subject to criminal penalties; specifically, "The doctor's failure to do so would be a first-degree misdemeanor, carrying up to six months in jail, for the first violation and a fourth-degree felony, carrying up to 18 months in jail, for subsequent violations." A bill similar to the 2011–2012 bill was introduced by Christina Hagan in 2013, titled HB 248. A further "fetal heartbeat" law was introduced on August 14, 2013, by Lynn Wachtmann and others. In 2013, Ohio passed a Targeted Regulation of Abortion Providers (TRAP) bill containing provisions related to admitting privileges and licensing and requiring clinics to have a transfer agreement with a hospital. "Fetal heartbeat" bills appeared again in the state legislature in 2014. On March 25, 2015, another "heartbeat" bill (House Bill 69) passed the Ohio House of Representatives. The Guardian reported that "The bill is unlikely to go any further, facing stiff opposition in the senate as well as from John Kasich, the Republican governor of Ohio." On December 6, 2016, the Ohio Senate added a heartbeat ban provision to an unrelated bill, House Bill 493, previously passed by the Ohio House of Representatives. The bill was returned to the House and passed by the House the same day. The bill as passed would make abortion after the detection of embryonic cardiac activity a fifth-degree felony except in cases where a physician judges the abortion necessary "to prevent the death of the pregnant woman or to prevent a serious risk of the substantial and irreversible impairment of a major bodily function of the pregnant woman." On December 13, 2016, Kasich vetoed the bill. Attempts to pass a "fetal heartbeat" law continued in 2016, with Ohio being one of eight states nationwide that tried and failed to pass such legislation.

In early 2018, the House considered a bill passed by the Senate to ban abortion after 13 weeks and require that fetal remains be cremated or buried. In 2018, the state was one of eleven where the legislature introduced a bill that failed to pass that would have banned abortion in almost all cases.

Nationally, 2019 was one of the most active years for state legislatures in terms of trying to pass abortion rights restrictions. State governments with Republican majorities started to push these bills after Brett Kavanaugh was confirmed as a US Supreme Court judge, replacing the more liberal Anthony Kennedy. These state governments generally saw this as a positive sign that new moves to restrict abortion rights would be less likely to face resistance in the courts. Two "fetal heartbeat" bills were introduced in the Ohio General Assembly in 2019, marking the 133rd Session of the Ohio General Assembly as the fifth time such legislation has been proposed in the state. On February 11, 2019, Candice Keller and Ron Hood filed HB 68, which was introduced in the Ohio House of Representatives on February 12, 2019. On February 12, 2019, Kristina Roegner filed SB 23 in the Ohio Senate; the bill was referred to the Health, Human Services and Medicaid Committee on February 13, 2019. On February 21, 2019, the President of the Ohio Senate, Larry Obhof pledged to pass SB 23 out of the upper chamber stating, "We are going to pass that bill by the middle of March. I have no doubt at all." On March 13, 2019, SB 23 was passed out of the Ohio Senate by a vote of 19 to 13. The next month, the Ohio House amended the bill, and passed it, 56–40; the changes were ratified in the Senate, 18–13. The bill was signed into law by Governor Mike DeWine on April 11, 2019. At the time the bill passed, only 27% of the state legislators were female. The law, slated to go into effect in July 2019, would make abortion illegal after embryonic cardiac activity can be detected, usually between five or six weeks into the pregnancy. No exceptions for cases of rape or incest are made.

In July 2019 a federal judge temporarily enjoined the state's officials, and the County Prosecutors of Cuyahoga, Hamilton, Franklin, Richland, Mahoning, Montgomery, and Lucas Counties, from enforcing this prohibition against the state's abortion providers. This injunction does not, however, prevent County Prosecutors outside Cuyahoga, Hamilton, Franklin, Richland, Mahoning, Montgomery, and Lucas Counties from enforcing the criminal prohibition on post-embryonic cardiac activity abortions, nor does it prevent them from prosecuting individuals or organizations that aid or abet abortions after embryonic cardiac activity, which remains a criminal offense under Ohio law.

In November 2019, a bill was introduced by Candice Keller and Ron Hood, House Bill 413, which would if made into law ban abortion outright and require doctors to reimplant an ectopic pregnancy, a medical procedure that obstetricians and gynecologists contend is currently impossible.

In 2020 a bill was signed into law in Ohio requiring all aborted fetal tissue to be cremated or buried.

In 2021 the city of Lebanon, Ohio, passed an ordinance whereby abortion at all stages of pregnancy was outlawed. Mason, Ohio, also banned abortion at all stages in 2021, but its ordinance was repealed later that year.

August 2023 Ohio Issue 1 was put to referendum on August 8, 2023, and would have made it harder for voter-led initiatives to be proposed and approved. The issue was widely seen as being related to the issue of abortion, as November 2023 Ohio Issue 1, a referendum to restore Roe v. Wade-era access to abortion in the state, was slated to appear on the November 2023 ballot, along with future proposals to raise the minimum wage. The intent of this initiative, according to its creator, Republican State Representative Brian Stewart, was to "[stop] a whole host of [referendum] issues that we know are coming down the pike" including redistricting, minimum wages, qualified immunity, and, most notably, abortion rights. Of the more than 3 million votes counted, 57% were "no" votes and 43% voted "yes".

==== November 2023 referendum ====
November 2023 Ohio Issue 1 was a statewide referendum on whether to amend the state constitution to include a right to abortion and other reproductive healthcare. Ohio was the only state in 2023 to consider a statewide constitutional right to abortion.

Issue 1 was written to undo a 2019 trigger law, which was triggered by Dobbs, banning all abortion after six weeks — a so-called heartbeat law — with no exceptions for rape or incest; it included language that allowed Ohioans to "make and carry out one’s own reproductive decisions" to the point of viability. Viability is a medical concept determined by a physician and as of 2023 is generally considered to be between 22 and 24 weeks gestation. The initiative was also written to grant exceptions for later abortions to protect the life of the pregnant individual. The initiative was also designed to provide legal protections to anyone aiding someone in accessing abortion. Ohio's ballot board, which had a Republican majority, changed language in the ballot initiative to replace the word "fetus" with "unborn child" and to omit references to birth control.

The amendment was passed 56.78% to 43.22% with turnout that was heavy for an off-year election.

=== Judicial history ===
In 1913 in the case of State v. Tipple, the Ohio Supreme Court said, "The reason and policy of the statute are to protect women and unborn babes from dangerous criminal practice, and to discourage secret immorality between the sexes, and a vicious and craven custom amongst married pairs who wish to evade the responsibilities of rearing offspring." The US Supreme Court's decision in 1973's Roe v. Wade ruling meant the state could no longer regulate abortion in the first trimester; however, the Supreme Court overturned Roe v. Wade in Dobbs v. Jackson Women's Health Organization, No. 19-1392, 597 U.S. ___ (2022) later in 2022.

In Akron v. Akron Center for Reproductive Health, 462 U.S. 416 (1983), the Supreme Court declared unconstitutional an ordinance requiring second-trimester abortions to be performed in hospitals, and requiring patients seeking abortions to be informed of the status of the pregnancy, stage of fetal development, expected date of viability, health risks of abortion, and the availability of adoption agencies and childbirth resources. The Supreme Court also declared unconstitutional provisions in the ordinance requiring women to wait 24 hours after seeking an abortion, requiring parental consent for minors seeking abortions, and requiring that aborted fetuses be disposed of in a "humane" and "sanitary" manner.

The Supreme Court later overruled Akron v. Akron Center for Reproductive Health, 462 U.S. 416 (1983), in Planned Parenthood v. Casey, 505 U.S. 833 (1992).

In August 2024, a county judge in Ohio blocked the state's 24 hour waiting period for obtaining an abortion, citing that it was unconstitutional under November 2023 Ohio Issue 1. A few weeks later, another county judge in Ohio struck down two laws that restricted access to mifepristone.

In October 2024, the six week abortion ban was struck down by an Ohio judge, citing that it was unconstitutional under November 2023 Ohio Issue 1.

=== Clinic and provider history ===
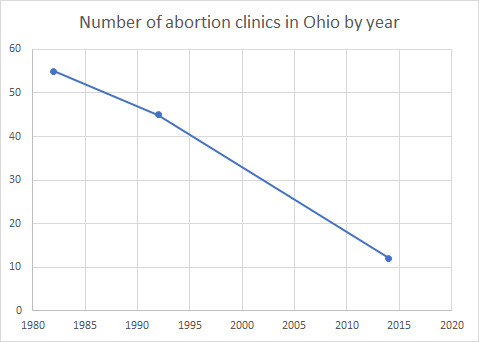
Number of abortion clinics in Ohio by year

Between 1982 and 1992, the number of abortion providers in the state decreased by ten, going from 55 in 1982 to 45 in 1992. In 2014, there were twelve abortion clinics in the state. In 2014, 93% of the counties in the state did not have an abortion clinic. That year, 56% of women in the state aged 15–44 lived in a county without an abortion clinic. In March 2016, there were 28 Planned Parenthood clinics in the state. In 2017, there were 27 Planned Parenthood clinics serving a population of 2,585,171 women aged 15–49. Three of the Planned Parenthood clinics offered abortion services.

== Statistics ==
In the period between 1972 and 1974, the state had an illegal abortion mortality rate per million women aged 15–44 of between 0.1 and 0.9. In 1990, 1,314,000 women in the state faced the risk of an unintended pregnancy. In 2010, the state had nine publicly funded abortions, of which nine were federally funded and none were state funded. In 2014, 48% of adults said in a poll by the Pew Research Center that abortion should be legal in all or most cases. The 2023 American Values Atlas reported that, in their most recent survey, 64% of Ohioans said that abortion should be legal in all or most cases.

The number of abortion clinics in Ohio has declined over the years, with 55 in 1982, 45 in 1992 and 12 in 2014. There were 21,186 legal abortions in 2014 and 20,976 in 2015.

Number of reported abortions, abortion rate and percentage change in rate by geographic region and state in 1992, 1995 and 1996
Census division and state	Number			Rate			% change 1992–1996
Census division and state	1992	1995	1996	1992	1995	1996	% change 1992–1996
East North Central	204,810	185,800	190,050	20.7	18.9	19.3	–7
Illinois	68,420	68,160	69,390	25.4	25.6	26.1	3
Indiana	15,840	14,030	14,850	12	10.6	11.2	–7
Michigan	55,580	49,370	48,780	25.2	22.6	22.3	–11
Ohio	49,520	40,940	42,870	19.5	16.2	17	–13
Wisconsin	15,450	13,300	14,160	13.6	11.6	12.3	–9

Number, rate, and ratio of reported abortions, by reporting area of residence and occurrence and by percentage of abortions obtained by out-of-state residents, US CDC estimates
Location	Residence			Occurrence			% obtained by out-of-state residents	Year	Ref
Location	No.	Rate^	Ratio^^	No.	Rate^	Ratio^^	% obtained by out-of-state residents	Year	Ref
Ohio	21,650	9.8	155	21,186	9.6	152	5.5	2014	
Ohio	21,215	9.6	152	20,976	9.5	151	5.8	2015	
Ohio	20,790	9.5	151	20,672	9.4	150	5.5	2016	
^number of abortions per 1,000 women aged 15–44; ^^number of abortions per 1,000 live births

== Political advocacy ==
=== Protests ===
Women from the state participated in marches supporting abortion rights as part of a #StoptheBans movement in May 2019. In May 2019, women participated in a heartbeat ban bill protest in Cleveland as part of #StoptheBans movement. It was organized by NARAL Pro Choice Ohio, Planned Parenthood Advocates of Ohio and Cleveland State University students. A #StoptheBans protest in Cincinnati saw dozens of people participating outside the Hamilton County Courthouse where they chanted "Right to life, that's a lie, you don't care if women die".

Following the overturn of Roe v. Wade on June 24, 2022, hundreds of abortion rights protesters gathered at the Ohio State Capitol in Columbus. Other protests were held in Akron, Bowling Green, Cincinnati, and Cleveland. On July 10, a group of abortion rights protesters in Cleveland camped out in front of City Hall for a week.

On July 5, 2023, Ohioans United For Reproductive Rights submitted over 700,000 signatures to the Ohio Secretary of State for their petition to get abortion rights on the November 2023 ballot, more than the 414,000 signatures required.

=== Pro-life organizations ===
==== Right to Life Action Coalition of Ohio (RTLACO) ====
Right to Life Action Coalition of Ohio (RTLACO) is an association of over 30 grassroots pro‑life organizations, advocating for state‑level laws and has supported legislation such as Ohio's "heartbeat bill".

== Attacks on abortion clinics ==
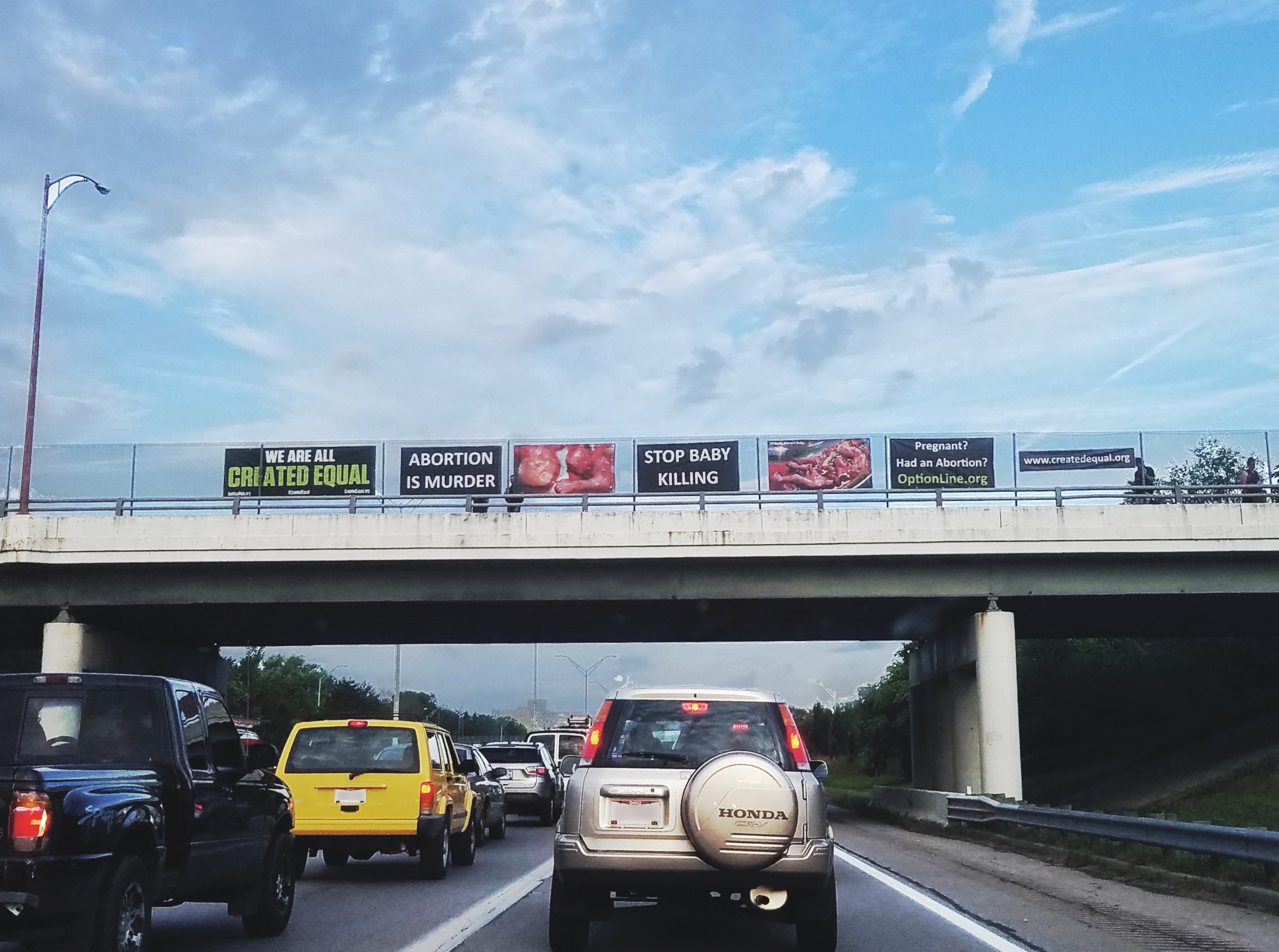
Political signage on I-70 in Columbus in August 2018

The first clinic arson occurred in Oregon in March 1976 and the first bombing occurred in February 1978 in Ohio. In 1978, there were three arson attacks and four bomb attacks on abortion facilities in the United States. Of these seven attacks, all but two took place in Ohio. These seven attacks caused combined damage of US$800,000.

In 1977, there were four arson attacks on abortion clinics. These took place in Minnesota, Vermont, Nebraska and Ohio. Combined, they caused over US$1.1 million in damage. By 2000, an act of violence had taken place at an abortion clinic in Shelby County, Ohio.

On March 7, 2016, Rachel Ann Jackson, 71, vandalized a Planned Parenthood clinic in Columbus, Ohio, with the message "SATAN DEN OF BABY KILLERS..." She pleaded guilty to felony counts of breaking and entering and vandalism and a misdemeanor count of aggravated trespass. Jackson was sentenced to probation, with the judge citing her struggle with serious mental illness as a mitigating factor.

On April 9, 2026, an intruder set a fire at a Planned Parenthood clinic in the Mount Auburn neighborhood of Cincinnati.

== Local ordinances ==
In 1978, Akron, Ohio, passed a city ordinance that restricted abortion rights. Its provisions included requiring all abortions beyond the first trimester of pregnancy to be performed in a hospital; a doctor to inform the patient of the status of fetal development, risks of abortion, and childbirth and adoption resources; and a 24-hour waiting period. The ordinance was ruled unconstitutional by the Supreme Court of the United States in City of Akron v. Akron Center for Reproductive Health.

The city of Lebanon, Ohio, in 2021 outlawed most abortions within its city boundaries and declared itself a "sanctuary city for the unborn". The Lebanon ordinance declares abortion to be "a murderous act of violence that purposefully and knowingly terminates a human life," and it outlaws abortion "at all times and at all stages of pregnancy." The only exception is for abortions performed "in response to a life-threatening physical condition aggravated by, caused by, or arising from a pregnancy" that "places the woman in danger of death or a serious risk of substantial impairment of a major bodily function unless an abortion is performed." The ordinance was adopted by a unanimous vote of the Lebanon city council on May 25, 2021.

The city council of Mason adopted a similar ordinance outlawing most abortions within city limits on October 25, 2021. The ordinance also declares abortion-inducing drugs to be contraband and outlaws their possession and distribution within city limits. Violators are subject to punishment of up to 180 days in jail and a fine of up to $1,000. On December 13, 2021, the city council of Mason voted to repeal this ordinance.

== See also ==
- 2022 Ohio child-rape and Indiana abortion case
- November 2023 Ohio Issue 1
