= August 2023 Ohio Issue 1 =

Referendum on voter-led initiatives

Issue 1
- August 8, 2023
- Elevating the Standards to Qualify for an Initiated Constitutional Amendment and to Pass a Constitutional Amendment

Results
Choice	Votes	%
Yes	1,329,052	42.89%
No	1,769,482	57.11%
Total votes	3,098,534	100.00%
- Yes: 50–60% 60–70% 70–80% 80–90% No: 50–60% 60–70% 70–80% 80–90%

A special election was held in the U.S. state of Ohio on August 8, 2023, on a referendum to make it substantially harder for voter-led initiatives intending to amend the Ohio State Constitution to be proposed and approved.

The initiative itself made no mention of other political issues in the state, but campaigning on both sides was frequently tied to the main hot-button topic on the ballot that coming November, also called Issue 1, which would have protected significant access to abortion within the state. The failure of this issue cleared the way for that later initiative to be passed by Ohio's voters.

This issue was defeated by 57% to 43%, amid unusually high voter turnout for an off-year election held in August, with over 3 million ballots cast overall.

== Origins and basic provisions ==
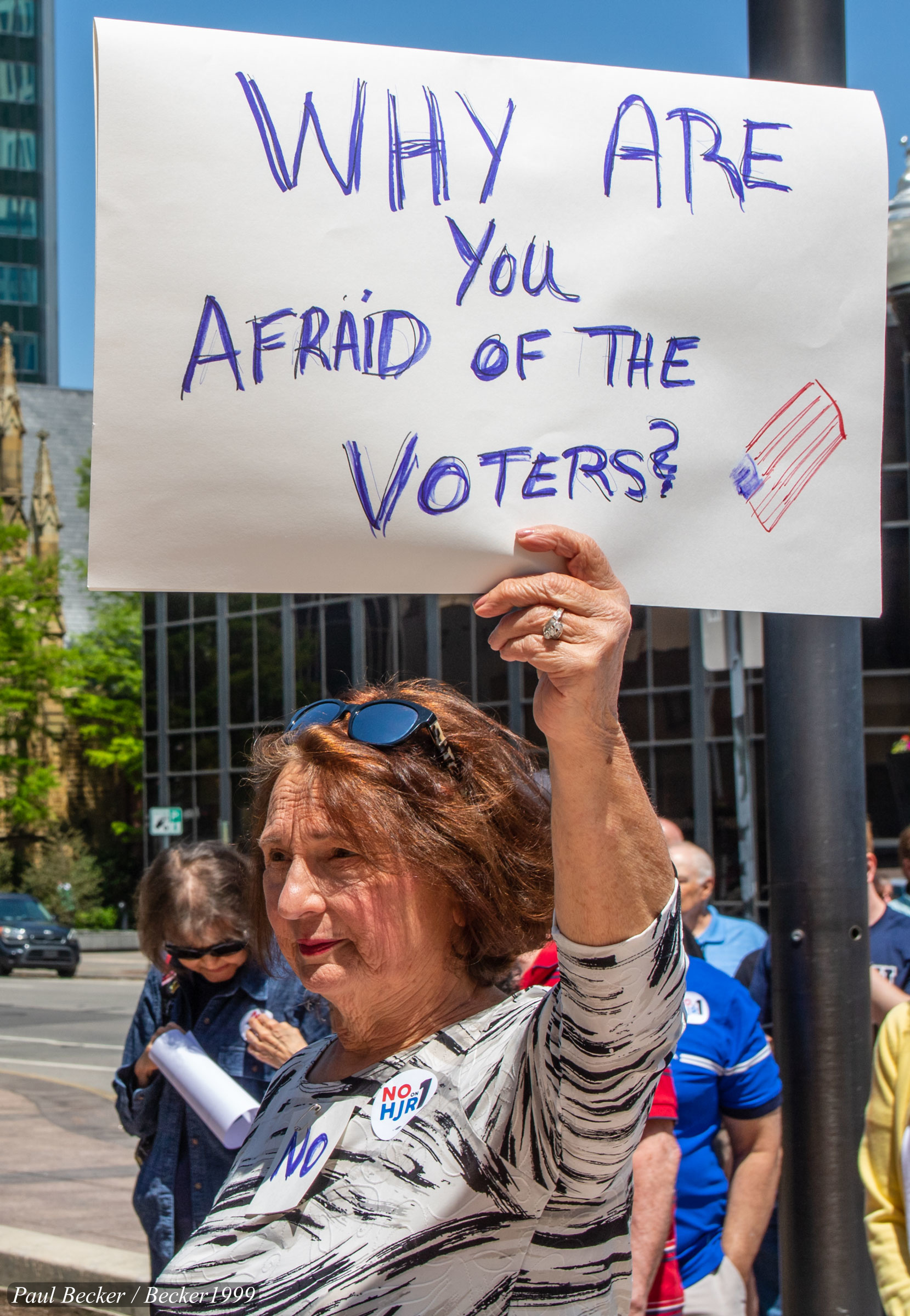
A protester at a May 2023 rally against holding the special election

The Ohio state constitution is one of many within the United States that allows issues to be proposed directly to the state's population. The allowance of voter-led initiatives was written into the constitution by the Initiative and Referendum Process Amendment of 1912, and since then, the official system for proposing additional amendments in this way was as follows:

(1): A petition must be filed with 1,000 initial signatures, and approved by the Ohio Ballot Board.
(2): The petition must gain a number of signatures of at least 10% of people that voted for governorship of the state in the most recent gubernatorial election, and
(2.1): Those signatures need to be gathered from at least half (44) of Ohio's counties, and at least half of counties must have at least 5% of their eligible voters sign.
(3): If enough signatures are not deemed valid by the Secretary of State to require additional signatures, the petition organizers have 10 additional days (known as a cure period) to collect more.
(4): Once the signatures are collected and the petition is deemed valid, the Ohio Ballot Board will decide the exact language, add supportive and opposing arguments, and put it before voters for election.
(5): If a simple majority (50%+1) of Ohio voters voted for passage, the amendment is added and becomes law 30 days afterward.

On March 22, 2023, a Senate Joint Resolution was brought forward by Senators Rob McColley and Theresa Gavarone to hold a special election on August 8th of that year for changing these requirements. This resolution went through committee relatively easily, and passed both the Ohio House and Senate on May 10th. The vote on the issue was split along party lines, with almost all Republicans voting for the proposal and all Democrats voting against.

If passed, this amendment would have changed the amending system for citizen initiatives in the following ways:

(1): Instead of requiring 44 counties to meet the 5% of eligible voters' threshold, petitions made, starting on January 1, 2024, would have increased that number to all 88 counties of Ohio.
(2): The cure period of 10 days to collect additional signatures (if necessary) would be eliminated, with no replacement process on petitions started after January 1st, 2024.
(3): The required simple majority for amendments to pass would be increased to a 60% supermajority. This was to take effect immediately after passage.

These changes would have not only made gaining ballot access for future initiatives to be proposed in 2024 and beyond significantly more difficult, but it also would have made passage for initiatives more difficult as well, especially on issues that polarized the electorate along political lines, as Ohio is a state that is split closely on party affiliation between Republican and Democratic-leaning voters.

== Politics surrounding Issue 1 ==
=== Election date controversy ===
The choice of August 8th as the date to hold this election was a controversial and highly criticized move. Elections that are not scheduled traditionally after the first Monday in November in Ohio, especially in years where there is not a presidential or gubernatorial race, are well known for having much lower voter turnout than other elections. It was alleged almost immediately after the Issue's announcement that this choice was a deliberate move by its Republican creators to take advantage of this likely lower turnout for getting the issue passed, despite a majority of total voters being against the issue.

Making the case for legislator hypocrisy further was the passage of House Bill 458 within the state at the beginning of that year, which (among other changes to election systems) explicitly banned special elections from being held in August, which would have seemingly also stopped this election from going forward. Both of this Issue's main sponsors in the Senate also voted to pass that bill into law. This apparent contradiction was immediately pounced upon by opponents, whom quickly filed suit in the Ohio Supreme Court to stop the election.

The suit was filed against Ohio Secretary of State Frank LaRose, who had also publicly expressed support for the removal of August special elections, saying that they “aren’t good for taxpayers, election officials, voters or the civic health of our state.” However, Frank himself disregarded his earlier statements and argued in defense here that a special election brought forward by the legislature (as this one was) could be done without restriction, citing general overriding constitutional authority. Most outside views on the controversy generally disagreed with LaRose's arguments, but regardless, the Court ruled 4-3 that the request would be denied, and the election would go on as scheduled. This vote was also party-line: the four Republicans on the court voted to deny the request while the three Democrats voted to stop the special election.

=== Near-term political effects ===
Both left-leaning and right-leaning politicians, think tanks, activist groups, and associated organizations pushed their views on how this issue could affect the future status of societal proposals, especially when it came to the upcoming issue of abortion rights.

Republican legislators had been angling to restrict abortions after six weeks of gestation for over a decade within the state, and in 2019 they finally got their wish, with Governor Mike DeWine signing Senate Bill 23, the 'heartbeat bill', into law. However, due to Roe v. Wade providing protection for abortions federally, this law was not enforceable at the time. The 2022 overturn of Roe v. Wade removed this federal protection, and thus the heartbeat standard became official throughout the state. Pro-abortion advocates and organizations launched several lawsuits almost immediately to take down the law, and were eventually successful in gaining an injunction in September of that year. That injunction was immediately appealed up to the Ohio Supreme Court, and as of May 2023 they had not made a ruling on the matter. Therefore, as of then, abortions were allowed, tenuously, up to 20 weeks after pregnancy.

November's Issue 1 would have written that allowance into the state constitution, making SB 23 null and void and keeping the question of abortion rights out of the hands of state legislators. The raising of vote requirements to 60%, if put in force, would have severely affected the chance for this issue to pass. Polling on abortion rights during the past year leading up showed that support for keeping expanded abortion protections was only around 58%, which would not have been enough to overcome the new requirements.

Many supporters of this initiative were not quiet about wanting the upcoming abortion question to fail. LaRose, a Republican himself, admitted as such while railing against a whole list of hypothetical left-leaning proposals that this issue could imperil:

"And this [issue] is 100% about keeping a radical pro-abortion amendment out of our constitution, the left wants to jam it in there this coming November, and so yes, this is 100% about abortion..."

Pro- and Anti-abortion groups quickly latched onto the issue as well, painting it as essentially a referendum on the abortion question three months before the proper vote on the matter. This included a flood of donations, many coming from outside Ohio, through several abortion-focused PACs: around thirteen million dollars was poured in to two explicitly anti-abortion groups: Protect Women Ohio and Susan B. Anthony Pro-Life America. The amount for explicitly pro-abortion groups was much smaller, with Ohio Physicians for Reproductive Rights (the only major 'no' group) giving a mere $750,000.

Marijuana legalization, though not nearly as attention-grabbing as abortion, was the other of the two major proposals on the ballot the upcoming November. Since that issue (Issue 2) would have been presented to voters in the same way as the November Issue 1, one might think that this initiative passing would have raised that issue's passing requirement as well, however, this is not the case. The legalization issue was an initiated statute, rather than a constitutional amendment, and was thus not affected in any way by the proposed changes.

=== Other claimed political ramifications ===
The party-polarization of Issue 1 also made claims regarding future effects bend along party lines.

As mentioned before, LaRose mentioned more than just the abortion question while drumming up support. He also claimed two other proposals to come, including raising the minimum wage to $15 per hour (a petition for such was being attempted at the time), and an unspecified reduction of 2nd Amendment rights (likely referencing states expanding red flag laws, among other similar anti-gun changes). One pro-Issue 1 campaign ad also took aim at the ACLU for their opposition of Ohio House Bill 8, which disallowed schools from notifying parents of their child's change of gender identity and allowed parental scrutiny for content deemed 'sexuality content'. The same ad also mentioned the URGE group, tying their support of removing parental consent for minor abortions to the issue.

An anti-Issue 1 ad claimed that Republicans would soon ban all forms of birth control if it was to pass, although no such effort had been pushed within the state.

A debate held by NBC4 Columbus regarding Issue 1 also made mentions of an ad regarding gender-affirmation surgeries on minors, along with reiterating the claims regarding gun control.

=== Effects on state policymaking ===
The 60% supermajority requirement was the main point of contention in regards to the Issue itself. By far the easiest of the changes to grasp by the average voter, this proposed move was debated heavily among Ohioans both in-person and on the internet, with several campaign ads specifically focused on communicating how this change would effect their ability to make choices.

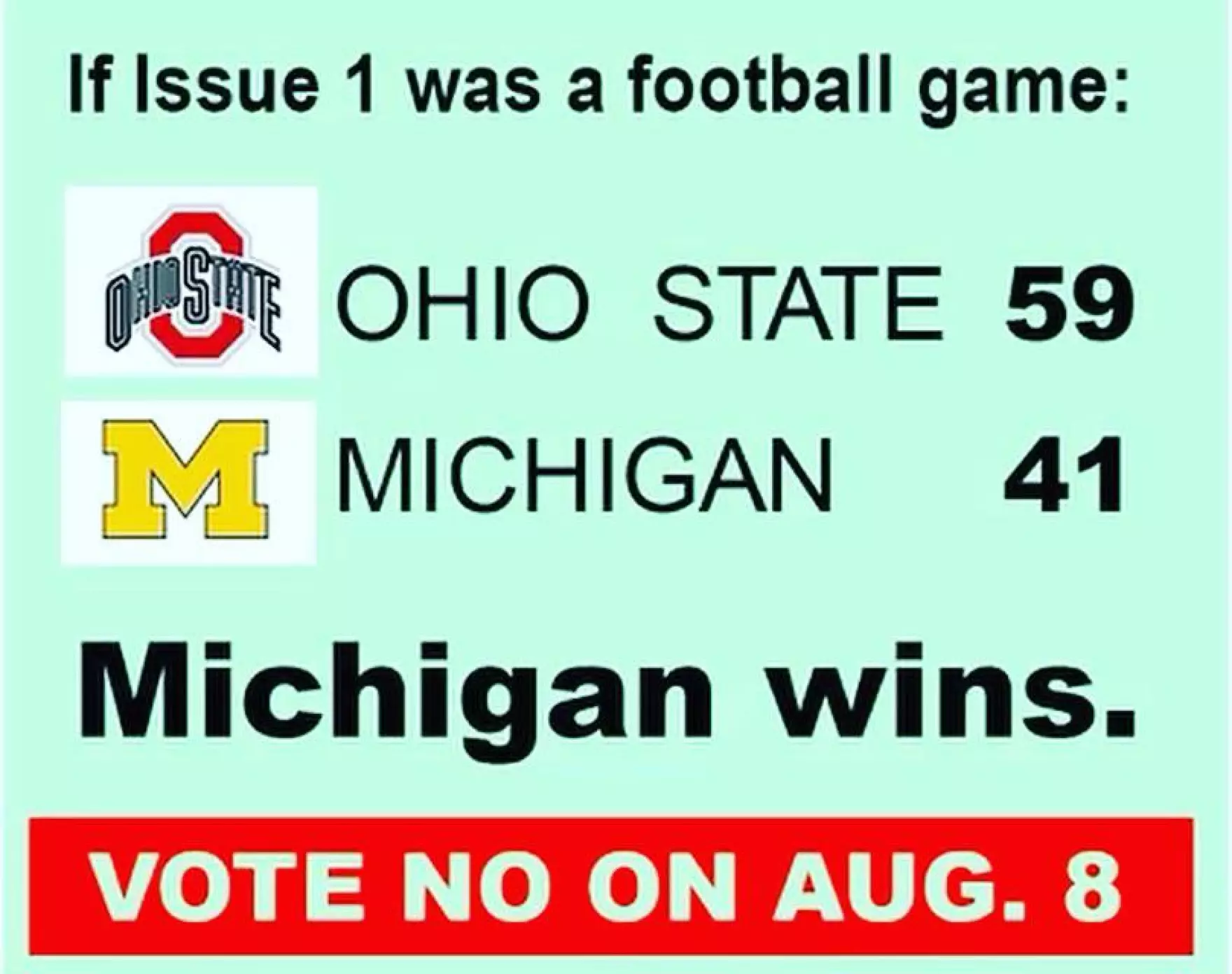
A popular anti Issue 1 meme that spread throughout social media in the month leading up to the vote, referencing 'The Game' between Ohio State and Michigan.

Opponents of Issue 1 campaigned heavily on the notion that this change was nothing more than an effort to weaken the power of the people in regards to changing the politics of their state. The new rules, in their view, were only an attempt to directly take away power from the voters, serving more to solidify a minority rule over Ohio by allegedly corrupt politicians than any other claimed purpose.

Supporters argued the opposite, that it in fact helped the democratic process by guarding against corporate interests pushing money to get issues onto the ballot, and allowing the voters to make their voice heard via electing their legislators on issues they cared about more directly. One campaign ad also referenced the United States Constitution, and how that document requires a minimum of two-thirds support from Congress to edit (in addition to the 3/4 states support requirement).

Regardless of which opinion one would hold, the facts of the matter are that making petitions harder to succeed and requiring a supermajority for amendments would have significantly reduced Ohioans' ability to use direct votes on political matters, instead leaving the task of changing policy much more in the hands of the Ohio General Assembly. The Ohio General Assembly is one of the most gerrymandered legislatures in the United States, biased heavily towards the Republican Party. As mentioned earlier, Ohioans themselves are split roughly 55–45 in favor of Republican support, however, the General Assembly, both House and Senate, are much more slanted. As of the 135th Assembly, the Ohio House contains 67 Republicans and 32 Democrats (67% R), while the Ohio Senate contains 26 Republicans and 7 Democrats (75% R).

For a theoretical Democratic-leaning major proposal to pass within this state, the following incredibly unlikely sequence would need to occur:

(1): The bill would pass through its appropriate committees in one of the two chambers. (Almost all committees have Republican majorities, and none whatsoever have a Democratic majority)
(2): Once through committee, it would have to pass through both chambers of the legislature (which, assuming party-line voting, would require 18 Republicans to cross over in the House, and 10 in the Senate, a cross-over which almost never happens except for unanimous votes on minor legislation)
(3): It would need to be signed by the Governor (which would likely be a Republican given the voter spread, and he/she would likely veto, sending it back to the chambers)
(4): If vetoed, it would need to gain three-fifths support from House and Senate to override (needing 28 and 13 Republican crossovers respectively, obviously more unlikely than the simple majority before)

Were the issue to have passed, the chance that a left-leaning political proposal would become law via legislature is all but zero, given the polarization of both parties. The 60% threshold would have been, in effect, the minimum barrier for such policies to have any chance whatsoever of survival.

=== Lead-up to the vote ===
With this initiative quickly gaining national prominence as well as state, money began to pour in from all over, a large sum of which did in fact come from out-of-state donors. Both sides received a large majority of their money from out-of state, with the anti-Issue 1 group Protect Our Constitution receiving a full $4 million out of its total $4.8 million from the conservative Illinois donor Richard Uihlein. The pro-Issue 1 group, One Person One Vote, received $4 million of their funds from two left-leaning groups: the Tides Foundation and the Sixteen Thirty Fund. These funds were in addition to major donations from other national groups such as the National Education Association and the left-leaning organizer Karla Jurvetson. Counting all forms of funding, by the time all campaigning for Issue 1 had concluded, over $37 million was raised for influencing; $20.5 million toward the "No" side, and $17.5 million toward the "Yes" side.

One Person One Vote sued the state in May, arguing that some of the ballot language on the issue was misleading. They claimed that the language was misleading for four reasons: the title implying that any form of constitutional amendment was subject to signature requirements, incomplete communication regarding the 5% county signatures requirement, the ballot not having information on what current law stated, and the word 'elevate' in the title having a positive connotation that would sway voters toward the 'Yes' side. The next month, the Ohio Supreme Court ruled on the matter, agreeing with the first two arguments, but not the latter two, and mandating the ballot be rewritten by the state's Ballot Board. The Board did so shortly afterwards and the new, final language was officially certified on May 18th.

This Issue was the fourth in the past five years attempting to put in supermajority requirements for passing amendments, all in Republican-led states. Of those four, three were rejected by voters, with the fourth (in Arizona) only applying to tax-related proposals. The most recent failure at the time was in Arkansas, that proposal being defeated with a 59–40 split in 2022. The most recent full-scale passing measure was in Colorado in 2016, that initiative passing with a 55% vote.

== Endorsements ==
The amendment was supported by the Republican Party of Ohio and opposed by a multipartisan coalition of groups including the Democratic Party of Ohio, Libertarian Party of Ohio, Green Party of Ohio, and several former Republican officials. Four former governors of Ohio, John Kasich, Ted Strickland, Bob Taft, and Dick Celeste, favored a "no" vote on Issue 1, along with a large majority of Ohio newspapers. Current Ohio Governor DeWine (a Republican) announced his support in a news conference.

Yes

U.S. Executive Branch officials

- Michael Flynn, 24th United States National Security Advisor (2017) (Republican)
- Mike Pence, 48th Vice President of the United States (2017–2021) (Republican)

U.S. Senators

- JD Vance, U.S. Senator from Ohio (2023–2025) (Republican)

U.S. Representatives

- Bill Johnson, U.S. Representative from OH-6 (2011–present) (Republican)
- Jim Jordan, U.S. Representative from OH-4 (2007–present) (Republican)
- Steve Stivers, former U.S. Representative from OH-15 (2011–2021), Head of the Ohio Chamber of commerce (Republican)

Statewide officials

- Mike DeWine, 70th Governor of Ohio (2019–present) (Republican)
- Keith Faber, 33rd Auditor of Ohio (2019–present) (Republican)
- Jon Husted, 66th Lieutenant Governor of Ohio (2019–present) and 53rd Secretary of State of Ohio (2011–2019) (Republican)
- Frank LaRose, 51st Secretary of State of Ohio (2019–present) (Republican)
- Robert Sprague, 49th Treasurer of Ohio (2019–present) (Republican)
- Dave Yost, 51st Attorney General of Ohio (2019–present) and 32nd Auditor of Ohio (2011–2019) (Republican)

State Senators

- Jerry Cirino, state senator from the 18th district (2021–present)
- Matt Huffman, 96th President of the Ohio Senate (2021–present) and state senator from the 12th district (2017–present) (Republican)
- Rob McColley, Majority Leader of the Ohio Senate (2023–present) from the 1st district (2017–present) (Republican)

State House members

- Adam Bird, state representative from the 63rd district (2023–present) and 66th district (2021–2022)
- Ron Ferguson, state representative from the 96th district (2021–present) (Republican)
- Jim Hoops, state representative from the 81st district (2018–present) (Republican)
- Don Jones, state representative from the 95th district (2019–present) (Republican)
- Susan Manchester, state representative from the 78th district (2019–present) (Republican)
- Dick Stein, state representative from the 54th district (2017–present) (Republican)
- Brian Stewart, state representative from the 12th district (2021–present) (Republican)

Individuals

- Jim Caviezel, actor
- Abby Johnson, anti-abortion activist
- Kari Lake, former television news anchor and Republican nominee in the 2022 Arizona gubernatorial election
- Richard Uihlein, founder of Uline

Organizations

- Center for Christian Virtue
- Metric Media
- National Federation of Independent Business
- Ohio Chamber of Commerce
- Ohio Hotel & Lodging Association
- Ohio Republican Party
- Ohio Restaurant Association
- Ohio Right to Life
- Ohio Farm Bureau
No

U.S. Senators

- Sherrod Brown, U.S. Senator from Ohio (2007–2025) (Democrat)

U.S. Representatives

- Joyce Beatty, U.S. Representative from OH-3 (2013–present) (Democrat)
- Shontel Brown, U.S. Representative from OH-11 (2021–present) (Democrat)
- Marcy Kaptur, U.S. Representative from OH-9 (1983–present) (Democrat)
- Greg Landsman, U.S. Representative from OH-1 (2023–present) (Democrat)
- Nancy Pelosi, U.S. Representative from CA-11 (2023–present), CA-12 (2013–2023), CA-08 (1993–2013) and CA-05 (1987–1993), Speaker of the U.S. House of Representatives (2007–2011, 2019–2023), House Minority Leader (2003–2007, 2011–2019) (Democrat)
- Tim Ryan, former U.S. Representative from OH-13 (2013–2023) and OH-17 (2003–2013) (Democrat)
- Emilia Sykes, U.S. Representative from OH-13 (2023–present) (Democrat)

Former statewide officials

- Dick Celeste, 64th Governor of Ohio (1983–1991) and 55th Lieutenant Governor of Ohio (1975–1979) (Democrat)
- Richard Cordray, 49th Attorney General of Ohio (2009–2011) and 46th Treasurer of Ohio (2007–2009) (Democrat)
- Lee Fisher, 64th Lieutenant Governor of Ohio (2007–2011) and 44th Attorney General of Ohio (1991–1995) (Democrat)
- John Kasich, 69th Governor of Ohio (2011–2019) and U.S. Representative from OH-12 (1983–2001) (Republican)
- Betty Montgomery, 30th Auditor of Ohio (2003–2007) and 45th Attorney General of Ohio (1995–2003) (Republican)
- Jim Petro, 46th Attorney General of Ohio (2003–2007) and 29th Auditor of Ohio (1995–2003) (Republican)
- Nancy H. Rogers, 48th Attorney General of Ohio (2008–2009) (Democrat)
- Ted Strickland, 68th Governor of Ohio (2007–2011) and U.S. Representative from OH-6 (1997–2007) (Democrat)
- Bob Taft, 67th Governor of Ohio (1999–2007) and 49th Secretary of State of Ohio (1991–1999) (Republican)

State Senators

- Hearcel Craig, state senator from the 15th district (2019–present) (Democrat)
- Paula Hicks-Hudson, state senator from the 11th district (2023–present) (Democrat)
- Vernon Sykes, state senator from the 28th district (2017–present) (Democrat)

State House members

- Michael Curtin, state representative from the 17th district (2013–2016)
- Dani Isaacsohn, state representative from the 24th district (2023–present) (Democrat)
- Dontavius Jarrells, state representative from the 1st district (2021–present) (Democrat)
- Allison Russo, Minority Leader of the Ohio House of Representatives (2022–present) from the 7th district (2019–present) (Democrat)
- Bride Rose Sweeney, state representative from the 16th district (2018–present) (Democrat)

Local officials

- Justin Bibb, 58th Mayor of Cleveland (2022–present) (Democrat)
- Andrew Ginther, 53rd Mayor of Columbus (2016–present) (Democrat)

Individuals

- Michelle Goldberg, journalist and author
- John Legend
- David Pepper, chair of the Ohio Democratic Party (2015–2020)
- Elizabeth Walters, chair of the Ohio Democratic Party (2021–present)
- Randi Weingarten, President of the American Federation of Teachers (2008–present)

Organizations

- American Civil Liberties Union
- Bend the Arc Jewish Action
- Common Cause Ohio
- Communist Party of Ohio
- Democratic Socialists of America
- Forward Party
- Green Party of Ohio
- Human Rights Campaign
- League of Women Voters of Ohio
- Libertarian Party of Ohio
- NAACP
- Ohio Citizen Action
- Ohio Democratic Party
- Sixteen Thirty Fund
- Swing Left
- Tides Foundation

Labor unions

- Ohio AFL–CIO
- Ohio Association of Professional Firefighters
- Ohio Education Association
- Ohio Fraternal Order of Police
- United Food and Commercial Workers
- United Steelworkers

Newspapers

- Akron Beacon Journal
- The Blade
- The Chronicle-Telegram
- Cincinnati Enquirer
- The Columbus Dispatch
- Dayton Daily News
- The Plain Dealer
- Sandusky Register

== Polling ==
Poll source	Date(s) administered	Sample size	Margin of error	Yes	No	Undecided
Ohio Northern University	July 17–26, 2023	650 (LV)	± 3.7%	42%	41%	17%
USA Today/Suffolk University	July 9–12, 2023	500 (LV)	± 4.4%	26%	57%	17%
Scripps News/YouGov	June 20–22, 2023	500 (LV)	± 5.95%	38%	37%	26%

== Outcome and aftermath ==
Voter turnout was unusually high, particularly for an August ballot, with approximately 39% of registered voters casting votes on the issue. The Columbus Dispatch reported that it was the highest turnout for a non-general election since the 2016 primary.

Excluding outstanding absentee by mail and provisional ballots, the Dispatch reported late on August 8 with more than 99% of the votes counted that the referendum failed by a margin of more than 14%. Of the more than 3 million votes counted, 57.11% were "no" votes and 42.89% voted "yes". Decision Desk HQ, an election results reporting agency, called the race around 8:09 p.m. EDT, while The Associated Press projected that Issue 1 had failed around 9 p.m. EDT.

The failure of this issue marked the fourth out of five Republican attempts for reducing direct voter access to be defeated. Despite this defeat, however, no major changes in party support occurred. In practice, this issue only served to highlight the stark political divisiveness between the two major parties, and put even more highlighting on the abortion issue, a question that would dominate Ohio-related politics until that November. If one was to view this vote as an abortion referendum, it would end up being a quite close predictor, as November's Issue 1 ended up passing by a nearly identical margin to this issue's failure three months later.
