= Fairness Project =

Charitable organization in the U.S.

The Fairness Project
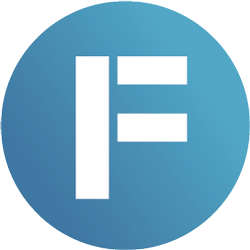
- Type: Economic and social campaigning welfare nonprofit organization, 501(c)(4)
- Founded: 2015, Washington, D.C.
- Headquarters: 1342 Florida Avenue Northwest, Washington, District of Columbia, 20009, United States
- Area served: United States
- Key people: Jonathan Schleifer (Executive Director); Steve Trossman (President)
- Revenue: ▼$6,363,274 (2018)
- Net income: ▼ ($3,488,002) (2017)
- Website: thefairnessproject.org

The Fairness Project is a United States 501(c)(4) charitable organization created in October 2015. They promote general economic and social justice throughout the US by the use of ballot measures to circumvent deadlocks in law changes by the legislative and executive branches of government. They act as a national body by supporting state organizations and campaigns with targeted funding rather than by direct campaigning. They support the gathering of signatures to meet the variable requirements to trigger ballots in states and then aid the campaigns with early financial backing, strategic advice, and various campaign tools.

The Project seeks to raise state minimum wages, both through stepped annual increases and through elimination of the tip credit exemption. It has expanded Medicaid coverage and provided funding in the most expensive ballot campaigns ever fought. Usually alongside their other campaigns, the Fairness Project has supported improving paid sick leave coverage. Following Dobbs v. Jackson Women's Health Organization, the Project has also supported legalizing abortion via statewide ballot initiatives. The Project has supported 17 proposals in total, of which 16 have passed. Concerns have arisen about the lack of transparency of non-state organizations like the Fairness Project influencing local decisions.

== History ==
The Fairness Project was created in Washington, D.C., on 22 October 2015 in the immediate run-up to the 2016 US presidential election. It is funded by SEIU United Healthcare Workers West, a California health care workers union. One of the major dispute points between Democratic and Republican candidates had been the issue of whether to raise the federal minimum wage, set at $7.25 for most employees as of 2019. The federal minimum wage was set in 2009 and therefore real-term values have dropped significantly since then; with no confirmed prospect of a federal increase, states gradually became pressured to raise their own minimum wage values. However, there were also deadlocks within state governments, both within state legislatures and between the legislature and governors (who could veto changes), which has led to an increasing number of local initiatives exercising their rights (either via law or state constitutions) to place proposals for statewide ballots to institute legislative change via direct democracy.

The founding executive director, Ryan Johnson, had volunteered to aid a number of these initiatives in 2015, before realizing that there was nationwide interest in increased usage. This led to the creation of the Project as a coordinating nonprofit organization that could fundraise on a broader campaign structure, educate electorates of their ballot rights, and focus financial and volunteer support where it was most needed. The initial focus was to use SEIU United Healthcare Workers West's strategy of placing ballot initiatives on minimum wage in the 24 states that allow initiatives.

== Minimum wage increases ==
=== 2016 ballots ===
The Fairness Project's focus for 2016 was a campaign to improve minimum wages. The campaign initially focused on three regions: Maine, California, and Washington, D.C., whose 2015 minimum wages were $7.50, $9.00, and $10.50 respectively. This provided a geographical mix and many difficulties – it was believed that while Washington and Maine would prove to be viable campaigns due to previous local votes for higher city minimum wages, California would pose a greater challenge due to a coalition of business interests that had killed the increase in the state legislature.

The proposed motions in Washington and California were fairly similar: they sought to implement an immediate small increase with additional annual graduated increases, leading to $15 in both states by 2020 and 2021 respectively. The target of the campaign in Maine was $12 by 2020 – a comparable increase to the other proposals.

All three proposals were initially successful by gathering the minimum number of required signatures: 365,880 for California, 23,200 for Washington, D.C.; and 60,000 in Maine. In Washington and California, support for the proposals placed pressure on the city and state governments, which caused both states to implement legislation equivalent to that in the initiatives; as a result, the proposals were withdrawn. In Maine the vote proceeded and was approved by 55.5% of the voters. After the vote there was a smaller campaign to reinstate the restaurant tip credit rule where tips could make up to 50% of staff wages, which would lower the effective minimum wage. As of 2018, restrictions on using tip credit were not being enforced.

As the campaigns proved to be successful, the Project expanded their support to local initiatives in the states of Colorado, Washington, and Arizona. The proposals for Colorado and Arizona also sought to raise the minimum wage to $12 by 2020, from $8.31 and $8.05 respectively. Washington, which already had certain areas with higher base wages, such as Seattle, settled on targeting $15.00 from $9.47 by 2020.

These additional propositions all remained on the ballot and were approved by their electorates.

=== 2018 ballots ===
In 2018, the Project made additional efforts to support local groups advocating minimum wage ballots. This support was focused in Missouri, where, together with the National Employment Law Center, a combined $537,500 was donated by advocacy groups; as well as Arkansas. Financial assistance was also granted in Michigan, where the proposal only narrowly satisfied the requirements one day before the deadline.

The Missouri ballot proposal aimed to increase the minimum wage from $8.60 to $12.00 by 2023 and eliminate the tip credit allowance. The Michigan proposal sought to raise the minimum wage from $7.70 to $12.00 by 2022 for everyone except government workers. Both ballots were voted on at the 6 November 2018 elections. Missouri voted in favour with a 61% majority. Michigan's legislature passed equivalent measures that removed the initiative from the ballot; these measures were repeatedly accused of enabling easier future amendments, as ballot-proposed law would require a three-quarters super-majority of each house to overrule.

The Arkansas proposal was a pure minimum wage setup crafted by David Crouch. It aimed to increase immediately from $8.50 to $9.25, with stepped annual increments ultimately to $11.00. The Fairness Project donated $100,000, functionally all on the signature-gathering stage. The proposal passed with 68% of votes in favour and was implemented.

=== 2024 ballots ===
In the 2024 elections, the Fairness Project supported combined minimum wage and paid sick leave measures in Alaska, Missouri, and Nebraska. Alaska's Ballot Measure 1 raised the state minimum wage to $15 by 2027 and required paid sick leave, passing with about 58% of the vote. The Fairness Project was the largest financial backer of the effort. Missouri's Proposition A raised the minimum wage to $15 by 2026 with paid sick leave and passed with about 58% with The Fairness Project's support. The organization also supported Nebraska's Initiative 436, which required paid sick leave and passed with about 74%.

== Medicaid coverage extension ==
=== 2017 ballots ===
ACA Medicaid expansion by state Not adopted Adopted Implemented

Starting in 2017, the Fairness Project redirected their primary focus to expanding Medicaid coverage, a joint state and federal program that covers some medical costs for those with few financial resources. A Supreme Court ruling in 2012 declares that states do not have to utilize the provisions in the Patient Protection and Affordable Care Act (commonly referred to as Obamacare) that expand Medicaid coverage, which requires legislation (created by state legislatures or successful ballot motions) to increase the number of individuals receiving Medicaid assistance.

The first campaign in 2017 offered support by the Project was in Maine where there was strong support to expand Medicaid. The Fairness Project donated $375,000 to aid both the campaigns to have the proposal meet signature requirements and then campaign for its passing. The proposal met the requirements to be added to the ballot and passed with 59% voting in favor. However, Maine law gave the power to Governor Paul LePage to veto passed ballot proposals, which he used seven times, stating that he "[would] go to jail before [he] put[s] the state in red ink". He argued that a clear funding stream must be designated and in place before he would approve the law. The state house voted in favour of implementing the proposal, 85 to 58, but failed to gather the two-thirds majority needed to override. Janet Mills, succeeding Lepage, signed an executive order implementing the change.

=== 2018 ballots ===
In 2018, the Project expanded their support to three similar proposals in Nebraska, Utah, and Idaho. As of July 2018, the Utah proposal had satisfied conditions to be voted on in the November elections. The proposals of Nebraska and Idaho also submitted a number of signatures they believed to satisfy ballot requirements, and despite challenges on verification, the proposals were accepted.

The Project's support was important in gathering the signatures in Nebraska where $338,000 was spent to support the campaign (primarily by paid signature gatherers) – making up 93% of the pre-ballot spending. Further spending in favour of a yes vote dramatically escalated, with the Project providing over 90% of the $919,000 total campaign expenditure in Nebraska by May. Support in Idaho was comparatively lower in size and proportion, though still significant, with expenditure slightly over half a million dollars, making up 50% of proposal expenditure. Support also needed to be more focused due to a harder signature process in Idaho than most ballot states.

The ballots were successful in all three states. Idaho approved the ballot with a 61% majority, but the campaigns were tighter in Nebraska and Utah with a bare 53% vote share. The Fairness Project remained the primary donor in the three races, spending a total of over $6,000,000. Funding shares remained fairly even – with the most controversial remaining the near-90% share of the Nebraska campaign budget.

The Project failed for the first time at the 2018 Medicaid ballots. A Montana ballot (that was added late to the Project's campaigns) motioned to extend the previously temporary expanded Medicaid provision and failed to pass. The ballot set a record for the most expensive campaign ever fought in the US, due to the funding provisions of the proposal, which placed additional taxes on tobacco products. As well as significant funding from the Project and other like-minded donors in favour, the tobacco industry spent $17,000,000 campaigning in opposition. After a failed vote, a compromised version of the Medicaid expansion was passed in April by the Montana legislature to extend coverage until 2025.

=== 2020 ballots ===
A primary remaining Medicaid expansion target for the Project is Florida, with up to 445,000 citizens potentially to be covered. Ballot measures can institute constitutional amendments but not new laws, and require over 760,000 signatures to take to ballot and a 60% vote to pass. The Project is the primary financial backer for local group Florida Decides Healthcare ($380,000 as of June 2019), enabling a first-stage target of 76,000 signatures to be met. This triggered a state supreme court review of the language used and state economists to review the expected costs of the measure. Concerns on the possibility of various additional deadlines being met ultimately led to the state campaigning committee to postpone the plan to the 2022 ballot.

Another targeted 2020 Medicaid ballot was in Oklahoma. The Project supported Oklahomans Decide Healthcare, with the 178,000 signatures necessary to be added to the ballot. Oklahoma has the third highest uninsured rate of any US state, with 5% of the adult population being affected if the state enacts Medicaid expansion. A 2019 bipartisan legislative working group was formed to consider potential legislative versions of the expansion. Campaigners met the signature requirement and submitted 313,000 signatures. The proposal is set to be voted on 30 June.

The other Medicaid expansion ballot targeted for 2020 was in Missouri. The Fairness Project provided initial seed funding of roughly $30,000 when the campaign was announced at the end of August 2019. The campaign required 160,199 signatures to be provided by 3 May, with the local campaign "Healthcare for Missouri" submitting 341,440 valid signatures. After an unsuccessful legal challenge, it was confirmed to be voted in on 4 August during Missouri's presidential primary elections. A successful vote is expected to cover roughly 230,000 additional adults, with the ballot also prohibiting additional constraints or requirements other than those already in place on those covered by Medicaid. As of June 2020, the Fairness Project had contributed $206,295.

=== 2022 ballots ===
In 2022, the Fairness Project backed South Dakota's Constitutional Amendment D, which required the state to expand Medicaid to adults earning up to 138% of the federal poverty level. Voters approved the amendment on 8 November 2022 with 56% of the vote, making South Dakota the seventh state to expand Medicaid by ballot measure and extending coverage to an estimated 42,500 residents.

== Abortion rights ==
=== 2022 ballots ===
The Fairness Project contributed to the passage of Michigan's Reproductive Freedom amendment and Vermont's Reproductive Liberty amendment. Both amendments secured the right to an abortion in each state's constitution. The project has supported similar initiatives in the states of Arizona, Arkansas, Florida, Missouri, Montana, Nebraska, North Dakota, Ohio, Oklahoma, and South Dakota for the 2024 election cycle.

=== 2023-2024 ballots ===
In November 2023, Ohio voters approved Issue 1, a constitutional amendment establishing a right to abortion, with about 57% of the vote. The Fairness Project supported the campaign both financially and with manpower on the ground.

From 2023 to 2024, the organization spent $30 million on reproductive-rights ballot measures and was among the largest outside funders of such campaigns. Voters approved measures the Fairness Project supported in Arizona (Proposition 139, with about 62% of the vote), Missouri (Amendment 3, about 52%), and Montana (Initiative 128, about 58%).

== Other issues ==
The principal other issue handled by the Fairness Project as of 2020 is paid sick leave. Although the topic was initially considered a goal for future election cycles, several of the ballot proposals supported in 2016 also had paid sick leave aspects, specifically Washington state and Arizona.

A Michigan ballot proposal was completed with over 380,000 signatures (well over the required 252,000) demanding varying levels of paid sick leave, which depended on company size. The Fairness Project participated less in this signature drive, most likely due to an established local committee and significant local support willing to sign for the proposal. An early sum of $100,000 was provided, with an additional $200,000 provided over the remainder of the campaign, and some minor in-kind aid, totalling 16% of campaign funds. The Michigan legislature decided to amend the proposal before passing it, which only required paid sick-leave coverage from companies with over 50 people and placed a lower maximum cap of 40 hours per year.

Campaigns in Texas to implement paid leave have demonstrated increased complexity compared to other "normal" ballot proposals, as the Texan attorney general asserted that a state law preventing such a requirement overrides any city-level legislation that might occur, even if generated via ballot. No statewide proposal has been offered; instead, various cities and areas have had local ballot proposals created, most notably in Dallas and San Antonio. This has been driven by the decision of state capital Austin to legislate paid leave in February 2018. The Freedom Project provided a loan of $383,813.

A Colorado proposal to implement paid family and medical leave is being supported by the Fairness Project to be placed on the November 2020 ballot. The Fairness Project provided initial funding for the local campaign group's (Colorado Families First) website. The proposal demands up to 12 weeks of leave as a standard, employment protections, and a funding set-up split equally between employers and employees. Signature gathering was disrupted by the COVID-19 pandemic, with the Project's executive director stating: "The very act of going to your neighbor and asking them to sign violates all the rules of social distancing." The signature gathering continued as the Colorado governor agreed to remote signature gathering, with a requirement to submit 124,632 signatures by 3 August.

In a significant variation, the Project gave a small amount of funding to help a Colorado ballot place firm restrictions on payday lending. The ballot sought to reduce the maximum interest rate to 36% from 200%, in an effort to reduce the rate of loan default from 25%. Compared to most campaigns, the Project's support was minor, with under $7000 contributed out of over $2 million, mostly donated by the like-minded PAC Sixteen Thirty Fund. The proposal received clear support, with 77.25% of voters in favor.

== Opposition and controversies ==
=== Transparency ===
Since the Fairness Project operates through local organizations or hires in-state groups, and is not required to disclose donor lists, there have been complaints that the project is using dark money to influence elections, which leads to a lack of transparency with voters unable to know exactly which groups might be trying to influence an election. This is particularly viewed as an issue with Medicaid expansion where groups with a vested financial interest might donate to the Fairness Project to shield their involvement from public awareness.

There have also been concerns about the scale of influence that a national campaigning nonprofit can use in a state election, especially when the majority of a campaign's funding is provided by the Project, such as when it funded over 90% of the Nebraska campaign. This has raised concerns about whether state voters are making a local decision by themselves. In a related complaint, there have been accusations that it is unfair for groups to support propositions that will not affect them.

=== Ballot usage ===
Primarily in reaction to the successful ballot proposals on increased minimum wage and Medicaid expansion, various states have either employed their rights to amend proposals in an aggressive fashion or, more frequently, moved to amend their laws to implement additional restrictions on ballot proposals.

The Maine government has used their right to implement changes to any proposals that receive the minimum number of signatures. The Maine governor used their right to repeatedly veto the proposal in order to continually delay the effect of the passed proposal expanding Medicaid provision.

Arizona lawmakers have proposed and brought in laws increasing technical requirements in signature gathering as have worked to repeal laws that prevent the repealing of passed ballot initiatives.

Idaho amended their ballot requirements in 2013 to include a geographical aspect: 6% of voters' signatures must also have 6% of registered voters' signatures in at least 18 of the 35 state legislative districts. The local organization Reclaim Idaho and the Fairness Project were able to use teams of local volunteers and also targeted paid signature gatherers to cover missing districts but the change has handicapped additional efforts.

Efforts to restrict ballot initiatives accelerated after 2021, with legislatures in multiple states advancing bills to raise passage thresholds and limit initiative subjects. In response, the Fairness Project launched a multi-state campaign to defend the initiative process through litigation and ballot campaign support. Voters have rejected several measures that would have made citizen initiatives harder to pass, including both South Dakota's Amendment C and Arkansas's Issue 2 in 2022 and North Dakota's Measure 2 in 2024. Ohio's Issue 1, which would have raised the passage threshold for constitutional amendments to 60%, was defeated in August 2023 with 57% opposed.

Several measures the organization supports around ballot usage are on the November 2026 ballot. These include a Missouri initiative that would limit the legislature's ability to amend or repeal voter-approved measures, which the Missouri Supreme Court ordered onto the ballot in September 2026 after state officials had rejected its petition signatures, and a Montana initiative protecting the initiative process.
