= 2023 Ohio Issue 2 =

Issue 2
- November 7, 2023
- Regulate Marijuana Like Alcohol initiative

Results
Choice	Votes	%
Yes	2,226,399	57.19%
No	1,666,316	42.81%
Total votes	3,892,715	100.00%
- Yes: 50–60% 60–70% 70–80% No: 50–60% 60–70%

The Regulate Marijuana Like Alcohol initiative, listed on the ballot as Issue 2, was a ballot initiative for legalization of cannabis in the U.S. state of Ohio that was passed by voters on November 7, 2023.

== History ==
State law in Ohio allows citizens to bring initiatives before the General Assembly, with signatures of at least 3 percent of the total vote cast for the office of governor at the last gubernatorial election. These must have been obtained from at least 44 of the 88 counties in Ohio. From each of these 44 counties, there must be signatures equal to at least 1.5 percent of the total vote cast for the office of governor in that county at the last gubernatorial election.

Once those requirements are met, a group can force the General Assembly to consider an initiative. When there is no action taken by the General Assembly or the Governor, by collecting more signatures of a quantity again meeting the above-mentioned requirements, the group can force to send it to voters on the November ballot. In Ohio, a group called the Coalition to Regulate Marijuana Like Alcohol brought the initiative to the Ohio Secretary of State to be a 2022 ballot initiative. It was approved on August 30, 2021, for signature gathering. Over 200,000 signatures were submitted to the state at the end of 2021.

A lawsuit over filing deadlines resulted in the Ohio Secretary of State and the General Assembly agreeing the initiative's signatures collected in 2021 and 2022 may be applied toward a 2023 ballot deadline.

In July 2023, on an initial count, supporters came up about 650 short of the required number of valid signatures. On August 3, more than ten times the remaining number required to validate the initiative for the November ballot were turned in to the secretary of state. On August 16, 2023, the secretary of state confirmed that the initiative would appear as a referendum ballot on November 7, 2023.

The initiative was passed by voters on November 7, 2023.

== Provisions ==
Adults age 21 and up may purchase, possess and consume marijuana. Adults over 21 are also allowed to grow up to six plants per person, or 12 plants per residence, at home.

The Division of Cannabis Control was created within the Ohio Department of Commerce to regulate cannabis commerce. This authority extends to cannabis testing laboratories and supply chain.

The initiative also specifies how tax revenues under the new law must be spent. Thirty-six percent (36%) must be designated for "social equity and jobs" programs, estimated to be as high as $150 million per year. Thirty-six percent (36%) goes to communities that have dispensaries. Twenty-five percent (25%) must go to education and addiction treatment programs, and 3% is used for regulatory and administrative costs.

== Sponsor ==
The sponsor of the initiative, Campaign to Regulate Marijuana Like Alcohol, is an affiliate of Marijuana Policy Project.

== Politics ==
The General Assembly passed medical cannabis (along with decriminalized cannabis) in 2016 under Ohio House Bill 523.

In early 2022, pro-cannabis advocates gathered signatures to send recreational legalization measure to the General Assembly. In April, the Senate president publicly announced that he would not bring the measure up for a vote. Under Ohio law, advocates then had a second opportunity to gather more signatures, and if they gathered enough, the measure would go on the ballot in November. "The recreational cannabis petition collected 136,000 verified signatures, enough to get considered by the General Assembly, but would require an additional 132,877 signatures to proceed to the ballot."

The largest organized opposition came from the Center for Christian Virtue, which believes legalized cannabis will produce negative impacts on neighborhoods and society's drug addiction problems. The main proponent behind the ballot initiative was the Coalition to Regulate Marijuana Like Alcohol (CRMLA), which dismissed the Center for Christian Virtue's opposition as "Prohibition-style talking points from 20 years ago."

In October 2023, Republican Senate President Matt Huffman warned that state legislators could repeal key provisions of Issue 2 if it passed.

== Endorsements ==
Yes

U.S. Senators

- Sherrod Brown, U.S. Senator from Ohio (2007–2025) (Democrat)

U.S. Representatives

- David Joyce, U.S. Representative from OH-14 (2013–present) (Republican)

State House members

- Jamie Callender, state representative from the 57th district (2019–present; 1997–2004) (Republican)
- Ron Ferguson, state representative from the 96th district (2021–present) (Republican)
- Michele Grim, state representative from the 43rd district (2023–present) (Democrat)
- Allison Russo, Minority Leader of the Ohio House of Representatives (2022–present) and state representative from the 7th district (2023–present) and the 24th district (2019–2022) (Democrat)
- Casey Weinstein, state representative from the 34th district (2023–present) and the 37th district (2019–2022) (Democrat)

Local officials

- Justin Bibb, 58th Mayor of Cleveland (2022–present) (Democrat)

Individuals

- Paul Armentano, Deputy Director of NORML and cannabis activist
- Connie Schultz, writer, journalist, and educator
- Brian Vicente, attorney and marijuana rights advocate

Organizations

- Green Party of Ohio
- Marijuana Policy Project
- National Organization for the Reform of Marijuana Laws

Newspapers

- The Oberlin Review
- The Plain Dealer
No

Statewide officials

- Mike DeWine, 70th Governor of Ohio (2019–present), 50th Attorney General of Ohio (2011–2019), former U.S. Senator from Ohio (1995–2007), 59th Lieutenant Governor of Ohio (1991–1994), and former U.S. Representative from OH-7 (1983–1991) (Republican)

State Senators

- Niraj Antani, state senator from the 6th district (2021–present) and former state representative from the 42nd district (2014–2020) (Republican)
- Matt Huffman, 96th President of the Ohio Senate (2021–present) and state senator from the 12th district (2017–present) (Republican)
- Steve Huffman, state senator from the 5th district (2019–present) and former state representative from the 80th district (2015–2018) (Republican)
- Terry Johnson, state senator from the 14th district (2019–present) and former state representative from the 90th district (2011–2018) (Republican)
- George Lang, state senator from the 4th district (2021–present) and former state representative from the 52nd district (2017–2021) (Republican)
- Mark Romanchuk, state senator from the 22nd district (2021–present) and former state representative from the 2nd district (2013–2020) (Republican)
- Steve Wilson, state senator from the 7th district (2017–present) (Republican)

State House members

- Sara Carruthers, state representative from the 47th district (2023–present) and the 51st district (2019–2022) (Republican)
- Jennifer Gross, state representative from the 45th district (2023–present) and the 52nd district (2021–2022) (Republican)
- Phil Plummer, state representative from the 39th district (2023–present) and the 40th district (2019–2022) (Republican)
- Bill Seitz, Majority Leader of the Ohio House of Representatives (2017–present), state representative from the 30th district (2017–present; 2001–2007), and former state senator from the 8th district (2007–2016) (Republican)

Labor unions

- Ohio Fraternal Order of Police

Organizations

- Center for Christian Virtue
- Dayton Children's Hospital
- Ohio Business Roundtable
- Ohio Chamber of Commerce
- Ohio Farm Bureau
- Ohio Manufacturers Association
- Ohio Republican Party

Newspapers

- The Blade
Declined to endorse

Organizations

- Ohio Democratic Party

== Polling ==
Poll source	Date(s) administered	Sample size (Note: Key: A – all adults RV – registered voters LV – likely voters V – unclear)	Margin of error	For	Against	Undecided
Data for Progress (D)	October 31 – November 2, 2023	582 (LV)	± 4%	61%	34%	6%
Baldwin Wallace University Community Research Institute	October 9–11, 2023	569 (RV)	± 4.5%	57%	35%	8%
Fallon Research	August 22–25, 2023	501 (RV)	± 4.37%	59%	32%	9%
FM3 Research	August 14–23, 2023	843 (LV)	± 3.5%	59%	36%	5%
USA Today/Suffolk University	July 9–12, 2023	500 (LV)	± 4.4%	58.6%	34.8%	6.6%

== Results by county ==
Breakdown of voting by county
County	Yes, %	Yes, votes	No, %	No, votes
Adams	43.8%	3,368	56.2%	4,326
Allen	46.2%	14,216	53.8%	16,581
Ashland	45.0%	8,200	55.0%	10,029
Ashtabula	55.2%	16,725	44.8%	13,590
Athens	70.6%	13,051	29.4%	5,443
Auglaize	38.6%	6,761	61.4%	10,741
Belmont	48.5%	9,112	51.5%	9,691
Brown	50.5%	6,742	49.5%	6,612
Butler	57.0%	64,223	43.0%	48,410
Carroll	44.8%	4,091	55.2%	5,043
Champaign	51.8%	6,887	48.2%	6,400
Clark	55.7%	22,595	44.3%	17,967
Clermont	57.3%	42,623	42.7%	31,749
Clinton	51.5%	6,768	48.5%	6,385
Columbiana	48.5%	15,517	51.5%	16,490
Coshocton	49.1%	5,360	50.9%	5,548
Crawford	46.9%	6,044	53.1%	6,834
Cuyahoga	66.8%	262,816	33.2%	130,329
Darke	37.9%	6,853	62.1%	11,232
Defiance	47.2%	5,954	52.8%	6,670
Delaware	55.5%	53,054	44.5%	42,594
Erie	58.8%	16,529	41.2%	11,565
Fairfield	52.6%	28,976	47.4%	26,080
Fayette	48.6%	3,939	51.4%	4,158
Franklin	68.0%	285,835	32.0%	134,764
Fulton	42.3%	6,424	57.7%	8,774
Gallia	44.7%	3,273	55.3%	4,043
Geauga	51.8%	21,078	48.2%	19,588
Greene	51.9%	32,034	48.1%	29,747
Guernsey	50.0%	5,582	50.0%	5,586
Hamilton	65.8%	186,770	34.2%	97,257
Hancock	46.7%	11,941	53.3%	13,623
Hardin	48.7%	4,014	51.3%	4,235
Harrison	44.7%	2,053	55.3%	2,543
Henry	42.1%	4,163	57.9%	5,731
Highland	46.2%	5,451	53.8%	6,343
Hocking	53.6%	4,770	46.4%	4,128
Holmes	31.4%	2,731	68.6%	5,961
Huron	51.6%	9,209	48.4%	8,635
Jackson	48.9%	3,968	51.1%	4,152
Jefferson	48.9%	9,691	51.1%	10,123
Knox	47.8%	10,576	52.2%	11,557
Lake	59.0%	52,940	41.0%	36,735
Lawrence	51.7%	8,506	48.3%	7,939
Licking	52.8%	32,848	47.2%	29,351
Logan	49.4%	7,631	50.6%	7,804
Lorain	59.6%	65,952	40.4%	44,634
Lucas	61.2%	72,214	38.8%	45,762
Madison	50.2%	6,925	49.8%	6,880
Mahoning	52.0%	39,060	48.0%	36,106
Marion	53.4%	10,025	46.6%	8,742
Medina	53.8%	39,752	46.2%	34,097
Meigs	52.0%	3,363	48.0%	3,108
Mercer	34.5%	6,040	65.5%	11,491
Miami	48.5%	19,289	51.5%	20,471
Monroe	43.7%	1,818	56.3%	2,339
Montgomery	60.3%	101,554	39.7%	66,975
Morgan	45.2%	2,073	54.8%	2,512
Morrow	48.5%	6,323	51.5%	6,705
Muskingum	48.9%	12,285	51.1%	12,814
Noble	41.8%	1,716	58.2%	2,387
Ottawa	54.1%	9,246	45.9%	7,843
Paulding	45.1%	2,837	54.9%	3,449
Perry	51.8%	5,632	48.2%	5,239
Pickaway	48.5%	9,162	51.5%	9,748
Pike	47.0%	3,501	53.0%	3,942
Portage	58.7%	33,839	41.3%	23,778
Preble	47.3%	6,687	52.7%	7,440
Putnam	30.8%	4,423	69.2%	9,938
Richland	49.8%	19,945	50.2%	20,074
Ross	53.0%	11,359	47.0%	10,058
Sandusky	52.4%	10,692	47.6%	9,694
Scioto	47.6%	8,424	52.4%	9,283
Seneca	50.2%	8,962	49.8%	8,881
Shelby	39.2%	6,785	60.8%	10,519
Stark	51.9%	65,865	48.1%	61,091
Summit	60.6%	115,174	39.4%	75,010
Trumbull	53.1%	34,345	46.9%	30,352
Tuscarawas	42.7%	12,138	57.3%	16,281
Union	52.1%	13,408	47.9%	12,330
Van Wert	44.6%	4,296	55.4%	5,330
Vinton	52.3%	1,796	47.7%	1,636
Warren	51.9%	46,970	48.1%	43,558
Washington	47.6%	9,277	52.4%	10,209
Wayne	44.6%	16,599	55.4%	20,648
Williams	43.6%	5,290	56.4%	6,856
Wood	55.3%	25,871	44.7%	20,875
Wyandot	46.4%	3,595	53.6%	4,145

== Reaction ==
On November 8, the day after polling, top Republican leaders in Ohio indicated the possibility of overturning the measures approved by the voters in the ballot, along with those of Issue 1 on abortion. Republicans who oppose the initiative are able to change the law and to repeal it due to holding majorities in both the Ohio House of Representatives and the Ohio Senate. Ohio Senate leader Steve Huffman, a Republican, said that given the result, Ohio legislators "may consider amending the statute to clarify the questionable language regarding limits for THC and tax rates as well as other parts of the statute." While Issue 2 mandates that marijuana tax revenue should be used to regulate marijuana, support substance abuse services, assist industry business owners and fund local governments where recreational business owners exist, Ohio House leader Jason Stephens, also a Republican, called for the Ohio "legislature to lead on how best to allocate tax revenues", and proposed "county jail construction and funding law enforcement training".

== Voter demographics ==
The referendum was polarized most strongly by age, with support decreasing as voters got older. White voters were less supportive than Black and Latino voters.

Men were more supportive than women for legal marijuana. Except for voters who never attended college, support was largely constant for educational attainment.

Ohio Issue 2 vote by demographic subgroup
Demographic subgroup	Yes	No	% of total vote
Total vote	57.0	43.0	100
Age
18–29 years old	84	16	12
30–44 years old	69	31	22
45–64 years old	53	47	35
65+ years old	40	60	31
Party ID
Democrat	79	21	32
Republican	30	70	35
Independent	64	36	33
Ideology
Liberal	85	15	34
Moderate	64	36	30
Conservative	23	77	36
Marital Status
Married	50	50	61
Unmarried	66	34	39
Married With Children?
Yes	58	42	23
No	56	44	77
Race
White	54	46	85
Black	72	28	10
Latino	66	34	3
Asian	N/A	N/A	1
Other	N/A	N/A	1
Gender
Male	58	42	47
Female	55	45	53
Area Type
Urban	65	35	40
Suburban	52	48	43
Rural	54	46	18
White Born-Again or Evangelical Christian
Yes	30	70	30
No	68	32	70
Parents
Men With Children	60	40	14
Women With Children	60	40	16
Men Without Children	57	43	33
Women Without Children	53	47	37
Education
Never Attended College	48	52	18
Some College	63	37	23
Associate's Degree	55	45	14
Bachelor's Degree	58	42	25
Advanced Degree	57	43	19
Union Household
Yes	63	37	30
No	55	45	70
2020 Presidential Vote
Biden	80	20	45
Trump	31	69	43
Another Candidate	63	37	5
Did Not Vote	64	36	4
Biden Approval
Strongly Approve	79	21	15
Somewhat Approve	80	20	24
Somewhat Disapprove	65	35	13
Strongly Disapprove	35	65	46

== See also ==
- Cannabis in Ohio
- List of 2021 United States cannabis reform proposals
- List of 2022 United States cannabis reform proposals
- List of 2023 United States cannabis reform proposals
- November 2023 Ohio Issue 1, an initiative appearing on the same ballot as 2023 Ohio Issue 2
