= 2022 Ohio child-rape and Indiana abortion case =

US abortion rights case

2022 Ohio child rape case
- Location: Columbus, Ohio, U.S.
- Date: May 2022; 4 years ago
- Attack type: Child rape
- Victim: 9-year-old girl
- Perpetrator: Gerson Fuentes
- Verdict: Pleaded guilty
- Convictions: First-degree rape (2 counts)
- Sentence: Life imprisonment with the possibility of parole after 25 to 30 years

On June 30, 2022, a ten-year-old girl from Columbus, Ohio, United States, traveled to Indiana to get an abortion because abortion law in Ohio did not provide an exception for minor children who became pregnant because of rape. Her case drew national attention and commentary from public figures, due in part to its proximity to the June 24, 2022, decision of the Supreme Court of the United States in Dobbs v. Jackson Women's Health Organization, which overturned Roe v. Wade and allowed states, including Ohio, to impose substantial limitations on abortion.

The girl had become pregnant in May 2022 when she was still nine years old. Her case was reported to the Columbus Division of Police on June 22, 2022. (Note: At 9 years old, well below the legal age of consent of 16 under Ohio state law for a person to be legally competent to consent to sexual intercourse, the girl's case prompted a rape investigation by the authorities. In Ohio, a person who engages in sexual conduct with a minor under age 13 is guilty of the first degree felony of rape per Ohio Revised Code Title 29, Section 2907.02.) During the ensuing law enforcement investigation, a 27-year-old man was arrested and charged with two felony counts of rape. He pled guilty in July 2023. The office of the Indiana Attorney General investigated the Indiana physician who performed the procedure, and referred the matter to Indiana's medical licensing board, which heard her case on May 25, 2023.

== Criminal proceedings ==
On June 22, 2022, the Children's Services department of Franklin County, Ohio, notified the Columbus Division of Police about a 10-year-old girl who was pregnant. She traveled to Indianapolis, Indiana where she underwent a medication abortion on June 30.

On July 12, 2022, a criminal complaint was filed with the Franklin County Municipal Court which alleged that the child was raped in mid-May 2022 (when the girl was nine years old) and that she identified a suspect to law enforcement in early July. According to the complaint, the suspect allegedly confessed when detectives brought him to police headquarters for a saliva test. The suspect appeared in the Franklin County municipal court for arraignment on July 13, 2022, and pleaded not guilty to the charges. His trial was scheduled to begin on July 5, 2023. The man is reportedly an undocumented immigrant from Guatemala.

In July 2023, the perpetrator, Gerson Fuentes, age 28, pleaded guilty to the charges. He was given a life sentence and must serve at least 25 years in prison before he is eligible for parole.

== Political reactions ==
On July 1, 2022, The Indianapolis Star reported that a ten-year-old girl who had been raped traveled from Ohio to Indiana to have an abortion. President Joe Biden highlighted the case in remarks at the White House on July 8, 2022, stating: "She was forced to have to travel out of the state to Indiana to seek to terminate the pregnancy and maybe save her life. Ten years old – 10 years old! – raped, six weeks pregnant, already traumatized, was forced to travel to another state".

Some right-leaning politicians and media sources initially called the story a hoax; an opinion piece by The Wall Street Journal Editorial Board said, "What we seem to have here is a presidential seal of approval on an unlikely story from a biased source that neatly fits the progressive narrative but can't be confirmed. The abortion debate is intense and passions run high. But the American people deserve better from their President than an unproven story designed to aggravate those passions". Speaking of Caitlin Bernard, the Indiana doctor who performed the abortion, Washington Post fact checker Glenn Kessler analyzed that "The story quickly caught fire, becoming a headline in newspapers around the world. News organizations increasingly "aggregate" – or repackage – reporting from elsewhere if it appears of interest to readers. So Bernard remained the only source – and other news organizations did not follow up to confirm her account." Kessler's analysis concluded, "This is a very difficult story to check. Bernard is on the record, but obtaining documents or other confirmation is all but impossible without details that would identify the locality where the rape occurred". Furthermore, "Dan Tierney, press secretary for Ohio governor Mike DeWine (R), said the governor's office was unaware of any specific case but said under the state's decentralized system, records would be held at a local level. Thus, he said, it would be hard to confirm a report without knowing the local jurisdiction to narrow the search".

After news of the arrest of the alleged rapist validated the Star's story, Kelly McBride, a media ethics expert at the Poynter Institute, said that journalists needed to report and "not just put more opinions out without any more additional facts". Dave Yost, the Ohio attorney general, doubted early reports of the incident, saying, "I'm not saying it could not have happened. What I'm saying to you is there is not a damn scintilla of evidence". Ohio Congressman Jim Jordan cited Yost in a tweet, stating that the claim was "another lie", and then later deleted the tweet. James Bopp, the general counsel for the National Right to Life Committee, said in an interview that the girl should have been legally forced to carry her pregnancy to full term and then give birth, and that "She would have had the baby, and as many women who have had babies as a result of rape, we would hope that she would understand the reason and ultimately the benefit of having the child". Bopp's comment led to ire from several left-leaning politicians and media sources, deriding Dobbs and the stance taken by the right. Governor of South Dakota Kristi Noem also commented on the case, saying that "I don't believe a tragic situation should be perpetuated by another tragedy". Previously, Noem had labeled the case in a tweet "Literal #FakeNews from the liberal media."

Yost, despite his initial doubts about the case, applauded the arrest of the alleged rapist. Yost also asserted at that time that Ohio law on the matter had been misconstrued, and that the girl could have received an abortion in the state if a treating physician deemed it a medical emergency, even if it was not life-threatening. Yost revisited his comments on the case in December 2022, following his reelection, stating his regrets that "what I said was not what people heard, and what people heard created a lot of pain", and describing himself as having "nothing in my heart but compassion and grief for what that little girl went through".

In an interview with NPR, Ohio senator JD Vance stated that the case was one of the instances where "reasonable exceptions" should be made to abortion bans.

In April 2023, the head of Cincinnati Right to Life, Laura Strietmann, commented that the girl should have been forced to give birth, explaining that although "a pregnancy might have been difficult on a 10-year-old body, a woman's body is designed to carry life," and that abortion rights should not be brought to a public vote. Despite Strietmann's argument, a vote was held in November 2023 which amended the Constitution of Ohio to protect abortion rights.

== Indiana investigations and lawsuits ==
The New York Times, noting the controversy sparked by the case, reported on the increased probability of medical complications due to pregnancy at a young age, stating that "prominent abortion opponents suggested the child should have carried her pregnancy to term", but that "midwives and doctors who work in countries where pregnancy is common in young adolescent girls say those pushing for very young girls to carry pregnancies to term may not understand the brutal toll of pregnancy and delivery on the body of a child". The Indiana OBGYN who performed the procedure, Caitlin Bernard, reported it as required by state law.

Todd Rokita, the Indiana attorney general, then announced an investigation into Bernard, stating that the doctor "used a 10-year-old girl – a child rape victim's personal trauma – to push her political ideology", and further asserting that she was "aided and abetted by a fake news media who conveniently misquoted my words to try to give abortionists and their readership numbers an extra boost". In an August 2022 opinion piece published in The Wall Street Journal, Rokita characterized an investigation into the doctor as aimed at protecting patient privacy. On November 30, Rokita requested that the Indiana state medical licensing board take disciplinary measures against Bernard. Rokita said that Bernard failed to tell authorities that the 10-year-old girl was abused, and also spoke to the news media about the treatment she provided, which Rokita said violates medical privacy laws. In late May 2023, the Indiana Medical Licensing Board voted to reprimand Bernard on the charge of violating patient privacy by discussing the case, fining her $3,000. The board voted to clear Bernard of two other charges, finding that she "did not improperly report child abuse and that she is fit to practice medicine".

Indiana University Health, where Bernard had admitting privileges, reported conducting an internal investigation, and finding the doctor to be in compliance with privacy laws. The doctor also reported receiving harassment due to having performed the procedure. NPR reported that following this incident, a substantial percentage of OBGYN medical residents in Indiana were contemplating leaving the state due to Indiana having a general ban on performing abortions and due to the way Bernard's actions were being scrutinized.

In November 2022, Bernard sued Rokita for launching a frivolous investigation. The court ruled that Rokita had improperly publicly discussed the case before complaints were filed. While Bernard attempted to drop the suit, Rokita moved to keep it open in protest of the court's ruling.

In February 2023, the disciplinary commission launched an investigation into Rokita. In September 2023, the commission filed professional misconduct charges against Rokita. Two charges pertained to his July 2022 comment to the media that Bernard was an "abortion activist acting as a doctor, with a history of failing to report"; the commission alleged that Rokita's comment had "no substantial purpose other than to embarrass, delay, or burden", and that Rokita's comment was an "extrajudicial statement" that Rokita "should reasonably know" would spread publicly and would have a "substantial likelihood of materially prejudicing an adjudicative proceeding in the matter". The third charge alleged that Rokita violated his "duty of confidentiality" due to public statements made before referring Bernard to the medical board. Rokita responded that the situation was one "that 'cancels' non-compliant citizens through intimidation as well as tactics that can weaponize our respected institutions", and also argued that the duty of confidentiality may only apply to his employees and not him, the attorney general.

In September 2023, Rokita sued Bernard's employer, hospital system IU Health, claiming that it had failed to protect the 10-year old's privacy. After the case was dismissed by a federal judge in June 2024, Rokita refiled an amended claim but then dropped the suit in August 2024.

== Incarceration ==
As of April 2026, the perpetrator, Gerson Fuentes, is at Toledo Correctional Institution.

== See also ==
- Abortion in Indiana
- Abortion in Ohio
- 2009 Brazilian girl abortion case
- C Case
