= Caitlin Bernard =

American obstetrician-gynecologist

- Education: Binghamton University (BS); State University of New York, Upstate (MD); Washington University (MS)
- Scientific career
- Fields: Obstetrics and gynaecology
- Institutions: Indiana University School of Medicine

Caitlin Bernard is an American obstetrician-gynecologist and reproductive and abortion rights activist. Bernard is a practicing physician affiliated with Indiana University Health, as well as an assistant professor in the Department of Obstetrics and Gynecology Indiana University School of Medicine. She also serves as associate medical director and director of ultrasound services for Planned Parenthood of Indiana and Kentucky, and has provided abortion services at Planned Parenthood facilities in Indiana and Kentucky.

== Early life ==
Bernard grew up on a farm in upstate New York, raised by socially liberal parents. Her father was a carpenter. Bernard first mentioned she wanted to grow up to be a doctor at the age of 5. Her sister recalled accompanying her to a Planned Parenthood to get birth control at the age of 15. She also traveled to Guatemala with her father to volunteer in health clinics. This experience was part of what formed her interest in obstetrics and gynecology.

Bernard completed her undergraduate degree at Binghamton University, receiving a Bachelor of Science in Human Development/Biology in 2006. She received her medical degree at State University of New York Upstate Medical University in 2010, completing a residency in Obstetrics and Gynecology. Afterward, she received at Master of Science degree in Clinical Investigation at Washington University in St. Louis School of Medicine in 2017. At Washington University, she also completed a family planning fellowship, for which she was accredited to perform more difficult abortion procedures, such as second-trimester abortion.

== Activism ==
Bernard is a public advocate for abortion rights, who has frequently given speeches, spoken to media, and lobbied state government in Indiana.

=== 2019 ACLU suit ===
In 2019, Bernard and another doctor sued, in a case brought by the American Civil Liberties Union, to overturn HEA 1211, also known as the "Dismemberment Abortion Ban"—a TRAP law which banned dilation and evacuation procedures. That law attempted to make such abortion procedures a felony for the doctor performing them unless it is to save the life of the mother or the fetus is non-viable. At the time, Bernard was one of only two doctors in Indiana performing the procedure, which only occurred 27 times in the state in 2017.

In May 2019, Bernard spoke at a Planned Parenthood-supported rally at the Indiana Statehouse, and stated—in reference to other restrictive laws recently passed in states like Alabama and Missouri—"It is only a matter of time before it is right here on our doorsteps". On June 28, just before the July 1 date the law was due to go into effect, it was blocked by the United States District Court for the Southern District of Indiana. Subsequently, the case was appealed and the law was revived after the Supreme Court's 2022 overturn of Roe v. Wade.

=== Post-Dobbs ===
In 2022, Bernard was at the center of a high-profile case in which she served as doctor performing a medical abortion for a 10-year-old girl. The patient had been raped, and traveled to Indiana from Ohio for the procedure in the wake of Dobbs v. Jackson Women's Health Organization, the June 24, 2022 U.S. Supreme Court decision that overturned the right to abortion. Since that incident in particular, which became part of the broader abortion debate in the United States, Bernard has become a high-profile abortion rights advocate, and was subject to intense public attention—which included an investigation into the matter launched by Indiana Attorney General Todd Rokita, and a lawsuit Bernard filed against Rokita for defamation.

Bernard's employer, Indiana University Health, conducted an investigation of the matter in 2022 and concluded that Bernard had not committed any privacy violations, as she had complied with patient privacy laws after the procedure she had provided to the 10-year-old girl. Nonetheless, after Rokita complained, the licensing board took up the matter, and voted to issue a letter of reprimand and impose a fine of US$3,000 (equivalent to $3,170 in 2025) upon Bernard, a decision it reached on May 25, 2023. The board voted to clear Bernard of two other charges, finding that she "did not improperly report child abuse and that she is fit to practice medicine". The decision prompted over 500 Indiana doctors to sign an open letter criticizing the board for its ruling, stating that it should not have taken up the matter and warning that its decision represented a dangerous precedent whose implications could potentially threaten public health.

In February 2025, Bernard and Dr. Caroline Rouse filed a lawsuit against the Indiana State Health Commissioner and the anti-abortion nonprofit, Voices for Life, to prevent the public release of termination of pregnancy reports (TPRs). The Indiana Department of Health had been withholding these abortion reports since August 2023 following a ruling from the public access counselor. On the heels of Governor Mike Braun's executive order mandating the Indiana Department of Health follow all abortion reporting regulations, Voices for Life settled their lawsuit against the State guaranteeing the release of TPRs on February 3. Bernard and Rouse filed their lawsuit days later, citing patient privacy concerns. Their request for a temporary restraining order preventing the Health Department from releasing TPRs was granted by Judge James Joven on Feb. 20.
