= Diocese of Ohio =

Diocese of Ohio usually refers to the Episcopal Diocese of Ohio.

Other dioceses in Ohio include:

- Episcopal Diocese of Southern Ohio
- Roman Catholic Archdiocese of Cincinnati
- Roman Catholic Diocese of Cleveland
- Roman Catholic Diocese of Columbus
- Roman Catholic Diocese of Steubenville
- Roman Catholic Diocese of Toledo
- Roman Catholic Diocese of Youngstown
