= Ohio Citizen Action =

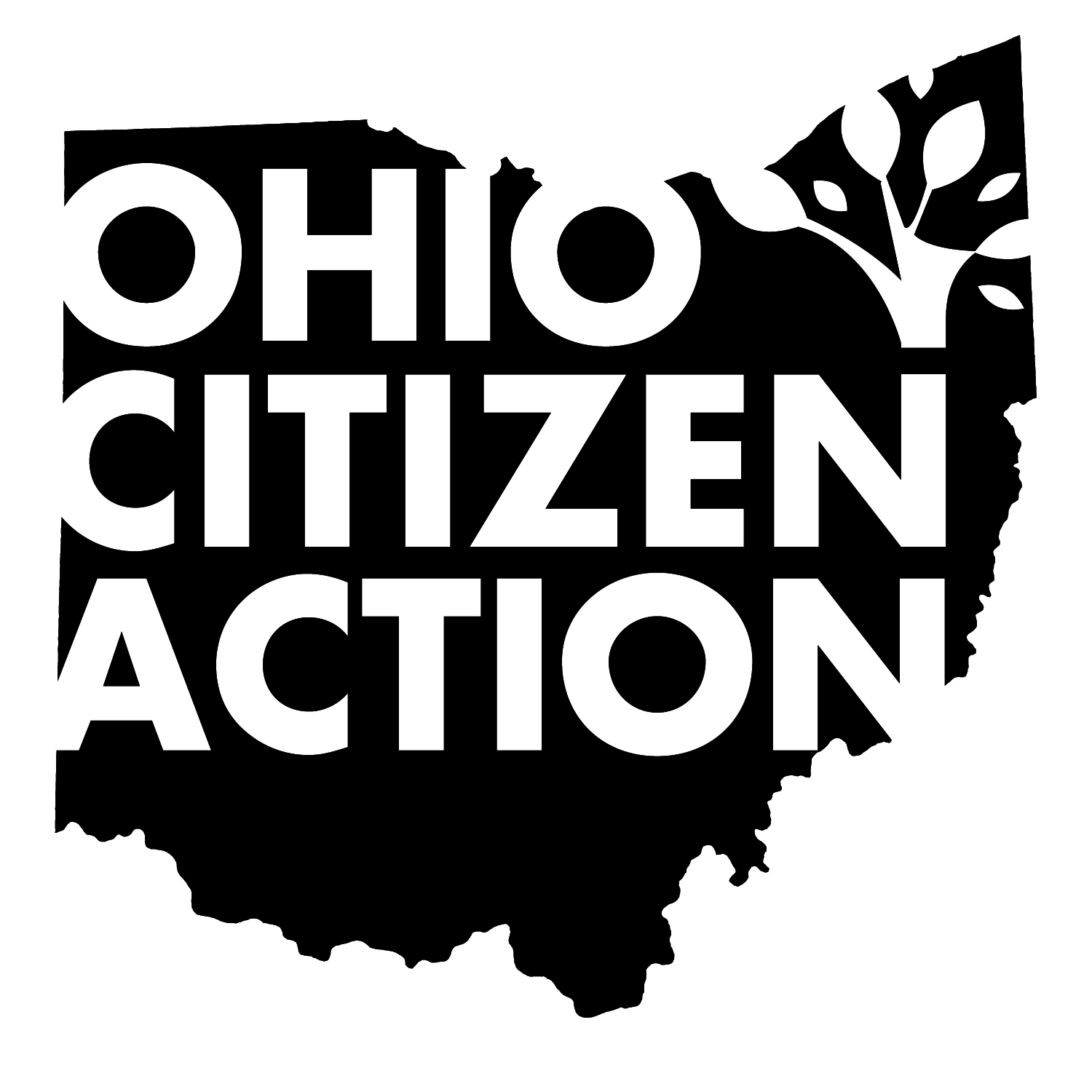
- Formation: 1979; 47 years ago
- Type: Nonprofit
- Tax ID no.: 34-1208942
- Legal status: 501(c)(4)
- Headquarters: Cleveland, Ohio
- Location: United States
- Members: 32,000
- CEO: Rachael Belz
- Board of directors: Brooke Smith; Heather Zoller; Thomas Ferguson; Carla Walker; Beth Havens; Phil Leppla; Carolyn Gilbert; Rhonda Barnes-Kloth
- Website: https://www.ohiocitizen.org/

Ohio Citizen Action is an advocacy group representing 32,000 members throughout Ohio. Over its history the organization has worked on issues as diverse as single-payer healthcare, expanding access to organic produce in grocery stores, securing majority rule, and speeding Ohio's embrace of a just and equitable clean energy economy. The organization was founded in Cleveland in 1975 as the Ohio Public Interest Campaign (OPIC), a coalition of union, senior citizen, church, and community organizations. Responding to a wave of factory closings in Northeast Ohio, the coalition proposed state legislation to require advance notice to employees before a closing (1977). The Ohio legislature balked, so U.S. Senator Howard Metzenbaum (D-OH) sponsored it as a federal bill. It became federal law in 1988. In 1989, the Ohio Public Interest Campaign changed its name to Ohio Citizen Action to reflect its change from a coalition to a membership organization. Their headquarters is located fifteen minutes south of downtown Cleveland, on Brookpark Road.

== Overview ==
Ohio Citizen Action recruits members with door-to-door canvass and telephone organizers. Members and others are organized and mobilized to influence decision-makers in business and government to act in the public's interests. Broadly speaking, the group works on environmental and consumer issues. Despite its classification as a 501 (c) (4) organization by the Internal Revenue Service, Ohio Citizen Action does not endorse candidates. Rachael Belz of Cincinnati has served as the group's third-ever Executive Director since 2014. Dr. Richard Wittberg of Marietta serves as the president of the Ohio Citizen Action board of directors. The president of the organization's 501 (c) (3) research and education affiliate, Ohio Citizen Action Education Fund, is Heather Zoller of Cincinnati.

== Toxic Chemical Right-To-Know and Good Neighbor Campaigns ==
Throughout the late 1970s and 1980s, the group focused primarily on environmental health issues, including landfills, hazardous waste dumps, groundwater and wellfield protection, incinerators, pesticides, and especially, industrial pollution.

In 1980, Ohio Citizen Action, working with allies in neighborhoods, firefighters, and labor unions, began a contentious two-year campaign that passed a Cincinnati toxic chemical right-to-know ordinance over the opposition of Procter & Gamble and the Cincinnati Chamber of Commerce. The Cincinnati ordinance became the model for laws the organization was able to pass in Akron, Cleveland, Columbus, Kent, Lancaster, Norwood, Oregon, and Toledo.

In the fall of 1985, Ohio Citizen Action and other groups across the country delivered more than a million petition signatures urging Congress to pass a strong bill. The measure passed by a one-vote margin and included an important new component, the requirement that industries report the chemicals being used and stored at their facilities, and their emissions into the air, land, and water. That was the birth, in 1986, of the Toxics Release Inventory.

Once created, the Toxics Release Inventory became the basis for “good neighbor campaigns” with polluting companies from the mid-1990s to mid-2000s. These campaigns combined community organizing, regional canvassing, direct negotiations with the company, and other techniques to cause major polluters to prevent pollution, according to former Executive Director Sandy Buchanan, “far beyond what federal or state regulations would require.”

Such campaigns have involved neighbors of AK Steel, Middletown; Brush Wellman, Elmore; Columbus Steel Drum, Gahanna; DuPont, Washington, WV; Envirosafe Landfill, Oregon; Eramet, Marietta; FirstEnergy, Northern Ohio; General Environmental Management, Cleveland; Georgia-Pacific, Columbus; Lanxess Plastics, Addyston; Mittal Steel, Cleveland; Perma-Fix, Dayton; PMC Specialties, Cincinnati; River Valley Schools, Marion; Rohm and Haas, Reading; Shelly Asphalt, Westerville; Stark County landfills; Sunoco Refinery, Oregon; Universal Purifying Technologies, Columbus; U.S. Coking Group, Oregon; Valleycrest Landfill, Dayton; Waste Technologies Industries hazardous waste incinerator, East Liverpool and Rumpke Sanitary Landfill, Cincinnati, Ohio.

Ohio Citizen Action has published a Good Neighbor Campaign Handbook (Lincoln, Nebraska: iUniverse, 2006), describing how such campaigns are organized.

== Energy and Consumer Campaigns ==
In 1979, Ohio Citizen Action and others promoted a successful ballot initiative to prevent the sale of the municipally owned electric utility currently known as Cleveland Public Power, when banks who were invested heavily in a competing power company, forced the city to consider selling.

Since the 1980s, Ohio Citizen Action has played a key role in stopping hundreds of millions of dollars in rate hikes by Ohio utilities including Columbia Gas, East Ohio Gas, Ohio Edison, Toledo Edison, FirstEnergy, American Electric Power (AEP) and Duke Energy. This includes fixed-rate increases proposed in 2018 that would have cost 1.5 million AEP customers $120 and 840,000 Duke customers $192 more per year on their energy bills, regardless of how much energy they used.

In the early 1980s, the group joined a vast coalition organized against the Zimmer Nuclear Power plant in Moscow, Ohio. Most groups in the coalition cited safety concerns and project mismanagement, but OPIC highlighted injustice to consumers who were paying Construction Work in Progress (CWIP) fees for a plant from which they had used no energy. By 1984, the Cincinnati Gas & Electric Company announced it would convert Zimmer to burn coal, instead of running the risk the plant would fail to secure a federal operating license after numerous cost overruns.

When Ohio's investor-owned utilities pushed to deregulate the electricity markets, Ohio Citizen Action helped write the “community choice” provision of the 1999 deregulation law, which allowed local governments to aggregate residents into a single buying group that could solicit competitive bids and save residents money. Later the organization advocated for aggregated communities to use their power to solicit bids for renewable energy to meet their electricity needs. In 2012, Ohio Citizen Action campaigned for the City of Cincinnati to aggregate and contract for renewable energy. At the time, Cincinnati was the largest U.S. city to do so.

Beginning in 2007, the organization took on the issue of coal plant pollution, with campaigns to end mountaintop removal coal mining, block a new AMP-Ohio coal plant in Meigs County and a Baard Energy coal refinery in Columbiana County, to press FirstEnergy, AEP, and Duke Energy to retire outdated coal plants statewide, to reform federal coal ash laws, and to uncover the financial and environmental risks to municipalities and ratepayers from the Prairie State coal plant in Marissa, Illinois.

In 2012, the group began campaigning against the practice of hydraulic fracturing (fracking) by Chesapeake Energy and other oil and gas drilling companies. The group urged Governor Kasich to include language to repeal the oil and gas industry’s exemption from reporting hazardous chemicals directly to emergency planners and first responders. Ohio Citizen Action also organized testimony from others, including doctors, nurses and first responders.

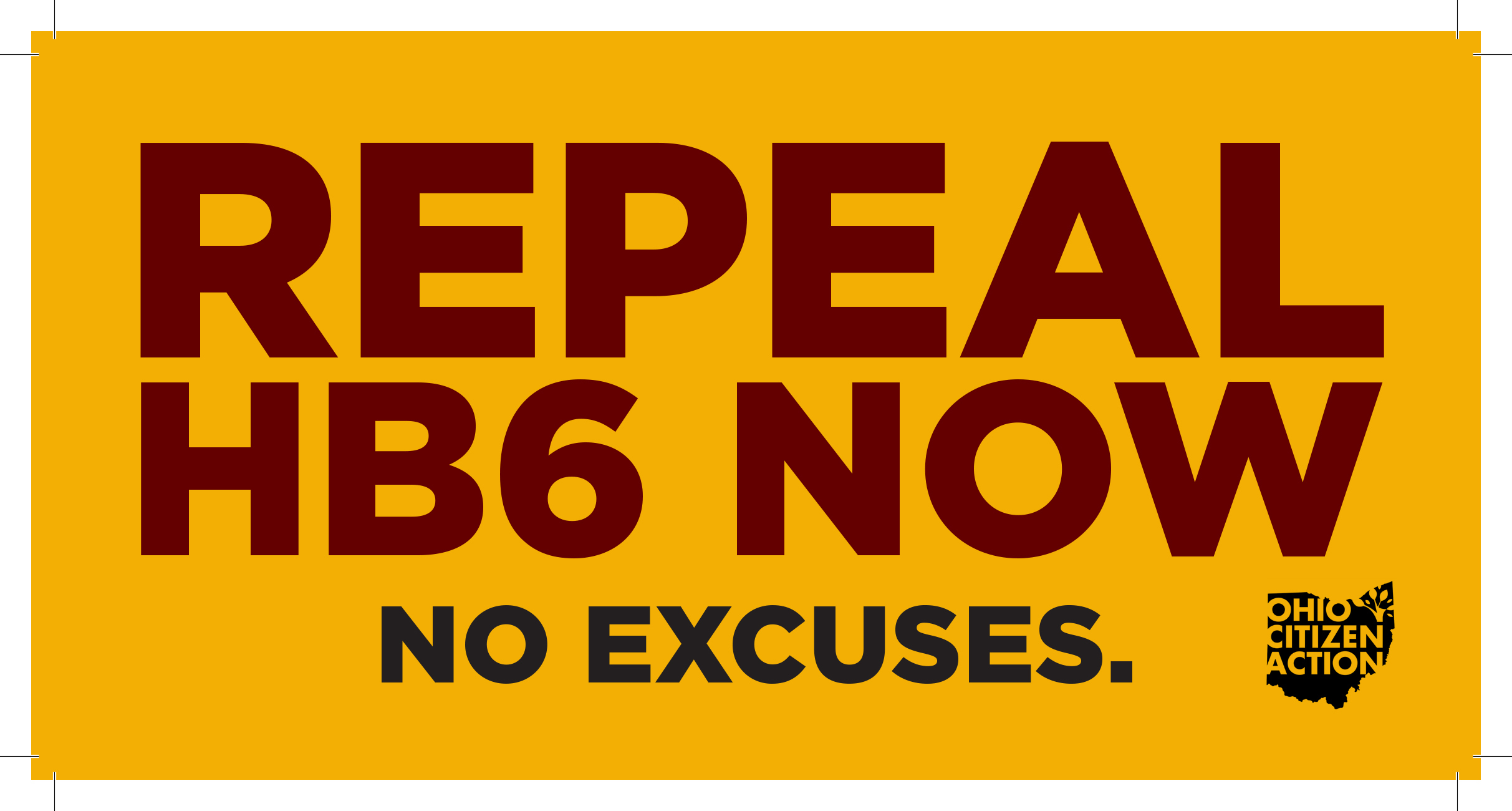
Repeal HB6 No Excuses promotional image

In 2019 Ohio Citizen Action joined the fight against House Bill 6, which began as a "clean air bill", creating a new program that rewards energy generation sources that emit zero carbon emissions with cash by raising funds through a tax on all Ohio ratepayers.

== See also ==
- Sustainability
- Biodiversity
- Global warming
- Ecology
- Earth Science
- Natural environment
- Nature
- Recycling
- Conservation Movement
