= Ohio Ballot Board =

The Ohio Ballot Board is a committee that writes the official wording of ballot questions submitted statewide to voters in Ohio.

The board consists of the Ohio Secretary of State and four appointed members, no more than two of whom shall be from the same party. One is appointed by the President of the Ohio State Senate, one by the minority leader of the Ohio State Senate, one by the Speaker of the Ohio House of Representatives, and one by the minority leader of the Ohio House. Members hold four-year appointments. A vacancy is filled in the same manner as the original appointment and must be filled with a person from the same party as the former member. The Secretary of State is the chairman and has the same vote as each of the other members. Three members of the board are a quorum.

The board prepares information on statewide questions and distributes it through boards of elections and public libraries.

See Ohio Revised Code sections 3505.061 and 3505.062 here. Title 35 of the ORC deals with elections.

The board's wording for 2024 Ohio Issue 1 was condemned by the group which initiated the measure, which alleged it was a leading question designed to induce a No vote.

== See also ==
- Ballot
- Elections in Ohio
