= Green Party of Ohio =

Ohio affiliate of the Green Party

- Founded: Early 1990s
- Headquarters: 1021 East Broad Street; Columbus, OH 43205
- Ideology: Green politics
- Political position: Left-wing
- National affiliation: Green Party of the United States
- Colors: Green
- Seats in the Upper House: 0 / 33
- Seats in the Lower House: 0 / 99

Website
- www.ohiogreens.org

The Green Party of Ohio is the state party organization for Ohio of the Green Party of the United States.

== History ==
The Green Party of Ohio grew out of a network of 5 Green "locals" associated with the Green Committees of Correspondence that were formed in the early 1990s. These included the Central, NW, NE, SW and SE Ohio Greens. These "Locals" made up the Ohio Greens and helped in the formation of The Greens/Green Party USA (G/GPUSA), the only national Green organization at the time.

Among other activities, this network of Green Locals formed the Ohio Greens Anti-Nuclear Organizing Committee (OGANOC) to fight against the creation of a multi-state low-level radioactive waste dump in Ohio. After several years of work, the Ohio Blue Ribbon Commission that had been formed to create the dump gave up their efforts due to the rising costs of doing so.

In the mid-1990s, and leading up to the 1996 US presidential election and Ralph Nader's minimalist candidacy, the Greens in Ohio were caught up in the strategic debate that found its expression at the national level in the competing GPUSA/Association of State Green Parties (ASGP) tendencies. Some Ohio Greens were decidedly non-electoral and did not support the ASGP effort for a Nader candidacy. The Green Party of Ohio's effort to put Nader on the ballot in 1996 fell about 315 signatures short.

In January 2000, Paul Dumouchelle convened a meeting of 11 prominent Ohio Greens and formed the committee that got Nader on the ballot in Ohio that year. Ohio sent four delegates to the Denver Convention that nominated Nader: David Ellison, Daryl Davis, and two others. Ohio had an active statewide Nader campaign and electoral results were similar to the national level. Logan Martinez ran for a State Representative seat in Dayton that year, as well.

Having won Minor Political Party status in Ohio through a lawsuit, the Green Party of Ohio ran its first candidates with Green Party affiliation on its ballots. In Cuyahoga County, David Ellison and Alan Crossman ran in the 2010 elections for County Executive and County Council.

In 2014, the party retained its place as a ballot-qualified party thanks to Anita Rios's campaign for Governor.

In April 2016, Cleveland City Councilman Brian Cummins switched from the Green Party to the Democratic Party.

The party helped its presidential candidate Dr. Jill Stein fundraise for recounts in three states.

In June 2021, the Ohio Green Party announced the revival of their Youth caucus, the Young Eco-Socialists. A month later, they began reviving more state-wide caucuses. In July 2021, the Labor Caucus of the Ohio Green Party was formed, the first of its kind for a state party in the Green Party of the United States, focuses solely on labor organizing and supporting the labor movement. Since July 2021, the Black Caucus, Women's Caucus, Energy (Anti-Nuclear) Caucus, and Lavender (LGBTQIA) Caucus have been launched.

During the 2021 local elections, the Ohio Green Party ran K.A. Heard Jr. and Logan Simmering for City Council in Cincinnati. They also ran James Kushlan for Toledo City Council at-large.

In May 2023, Wood County Green Party co-chair Joseph DeMare declared his candidacy for Bowling Green mayor. He finished second of three with 26.32% of the vote.

== Electoral performance ==
Ohio gubernatorial election, 2006
| Party | Candidate | Votes | % | ±% |
|---|---|---|---|---|
| Democratic | Ted Strickland | 2,435,505 | 60.54% | +22.23% |
| Republican | Ken Blackwell | 1,474,331 | 36.65% | −21.11% |
| Libertarian | Bill Peirce | 71,473 | 1.78% | |
| Green | Bob Fitrakis | 40,967 | 1.02% | |
| Write-ins | | 652 | 0.02% | |
| Majority | | 961,174 | 23.89% | +4.44% |
| Turnout | | 4,022,928 | | |
| Democratic gain from Republican | | Swing | | |

Ohio gubernatorial election, 2010
| Party | Candidate | Votes | % | ±% |
|---|---|---|---|---|
| Republican | John Kasich | 1,889,186 | 49.04% | +12.39% |
| Democratic | Ted Strickland (incumbent) | 1,812,059 | 47.04% | −13.50% |
| Libertarian | Ken Matesz | 92,116 | 2.39% | +0.61% |
| Green | Dennis Spisak | 58,475 | 1.52% | +0.50% |
| Write-ins | | 633 | 0.02% | |
| Plurality | | 77,127 | 2.00% | -21.89% |
| Turnout | | 3,852,469 | | |
| Republican gain from Democratic | | Swing | | |

Ohio gubernatorial election, 2014
| Party | Candidate | Votes | % | ±% |
|---|---|---|---|---|
| Republican | John Kasich (incumbent) | 1,944,848 | 63.64% | +14.60% |
| Democratic | Ed FitzGerald | 1,009,359 | 33.03% | −14.01% |
| Green | Anita Rios | 101,706 | 3.33% | +1.81% |
| Total votes | | 3,055,913 | 100.0% | N/A |
| Republican hold | | | | |

Ohio gubernatorial election, 2018
| Party | Candidate | Votes | % | ±% |
|---|---|---|---|---|
| Republican | Mike DeWine | 2,231,917 | 50.39% | −13.25% |
| Democratic | Richard Cordray | 2,067,847 | 46.68% | +13.65% |
| Libertarian | Travis Irvine | 79,985 | 1.81% | N/A |
| Green | Constance Gadell-Newton | 49,475 | 1.12% | −2.21% |
| Independent | Renea Turner (write-in) | 185 | 0.00% | N/A |
| Independent | Richard Duncan (write-in) | 132 | 0.00% | N/A |
| Independent | Rebecca Ayres (write-in) | 41 | 0.00% | N/A |
| Total votes | | 4,429,582 | 100.0% | N/A |
| Republican hold | | | | |
