= 2026 Ohio Senate election =

- November 3, 2026

17 of 33 seats in the Ohio Senate 17 seats needed for a majority
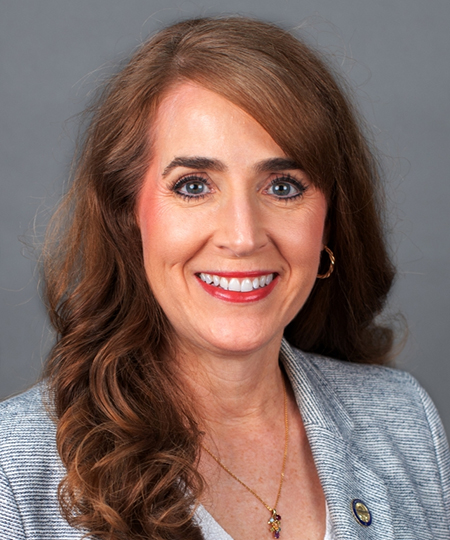

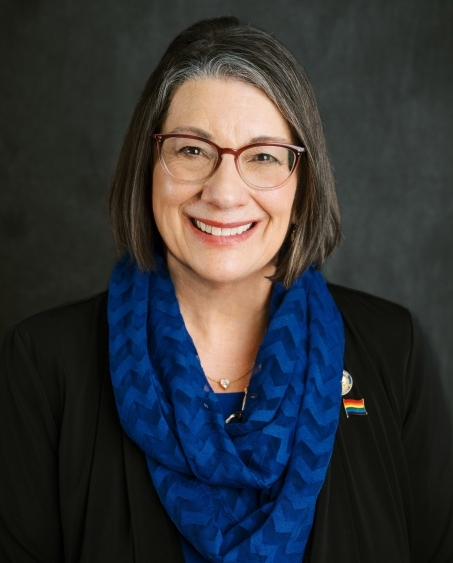
| | Majority party | Minority party |
|---|---|---|
| Leader | Theresa Gavarone | Nickie Antonio (term-limited) |
| Party | Republican | Democratic |
| Leader since | January 6, 2025 | January 3, 2023 |
| Leader's seat | 2nd–Bowling Green | 23rd–Lakewood |
| Last election | 14 seats, 62.01% | 3 seats, 37.99% |
| Seats before | 24 | 9 |
| Seats after | 22 | 11 |
| Seat change | ▼2 | ▲2 |
| Seats up | 11 | 6 |
- Republican incumbent Term-limited or retiring Republican; Democratic incumbent Term-limited or retiring Democrat; No election
President of the Senate before election
Rob McColley
Republican
Elected President of the Senate
Bill Reineke
Republican

The 2026 Ohio Senate election was held on November 3, 2026, to elect senators in 17 odd-numbered districts of the Ohio Senate.

== Outgoing incumbents ==
=== Republican ===
1. District 1: Rob McColley is term-limited.
2. District 5: Steve Huffman is term-limited.
3. District 7: Steve Wilson is term-limited.
4. District 13: Nathan Manning is term-limited.
5. District 19: Andrew Brenner is term-limited.
6. District 27: Kristina Roegner is term-limited.

=== Democratic ===
1. District 15: Hearcel Craig is term-limited.
2. District 23: Nickie Antonio is term-limited.

== Predictions ==
| Source | Ranking | As of |
|---|---|---|
| Sabato's Crystal Ball | Likely R | January 22, 2026 |
| State Navigate | Safe R | October 24, 2026 |

== Results ==
| District | 2024 Pres. | Incumbent | Party | Elected Senator | Outcome |
|---|---|---|---|---|---|
| 1st | R+49.0 | Rob McColley | Rep | Craig Riedel | Rep hold |
| 3rd | R+10.7 | Michele Reynolds | Rep | Stacie Baker | Dem flip |
| 5th | R+36.3 | Steve Huffman | Rep | Phil Plummer | Rep hold |
| 7th | R+16.9 | Steve Wilson | Rep | Zac Haines | Rep hold |
| 9th | D+49.1 | Catherine Ingram | Dem | Catherine Ingram | Dem hold |
| 11th | D+21.0 | Paula Hicks-Hudson | Dem | Paula Hicks-Hudson | Dem hold |
| 13th | R+10.8 | Nathan Manning | Rep | Gayle Manning | Rep hold |
| 15th | D+56.8 | Hearcel Craig | Dem | Latyna Humphrey | Dem hold |
| 17th | R+51.7 | Shane Wilkin | Rep | Shane Wilkin | Rep hold |
| 19th | R+20.8 | Andrew Brenner | Rep | Ryan Rivers | Rep hold |
| 21st | D+66.6 | Kent Smith | Dem | Kent Smith | Dem hold |
| 23rd | D+41.2 | Nickie Antonio | Dem | Bride Sweeney | Dem hold |
| 25th | D+31.3 | Bill DeMora | Dem | Bill DeMora | Dem hold |
| 27th | R+5.8 | Kristina Roegner | Rep | Mike Roberto | Dem flip |
| 29th | R+20.1 | Jane Timken | Rep | Jane Timken | Rep hold |
| 31st | R+43.0 | Al Landis | Rep | Al Landis | Rep hold |
| 33rd | R+23.9 | Alessandro Cutrona | Rep | Alessandro Cutrona | Rep hold |

== District 1 ==
2026 Ohio's 1st senatorial district election
| Nominee | Craig Riedel |
| Party | Republican |
| Popular vote | 104,450 |
| Percentage | 100.00% |
Senator before election
Rob McColley
Republican
Elected Senator
Craig Riedel
Republican

The 1st district includes a portion of Logan County and all of Defiance, Fulton, Hancock, Hardin, Henry, Paulding, Putnam, Van Wert, and Williams counties. The incumbent is Republican Rob McColley, who is the president of the Ohio Senate, who is term-limited and cannot run for re-election.

=== Republican primary ===
==== Candidates ====
===== Nominee =====
- Craig Riedel, former state representative from the 82nd district (2017–2022) and candidate for Ohio's 9th congressional district in 2024

===== Eliminated in primary =====
- Jim Hoops, state representative from the 81st district (1999–2006, 2018–present)

==== Results ====
Republican primary results
| Party | Candidate | Votes | % |
|---|---|---|---|
| Republican | Craig Riedel | 22,242 | 50.99 |
| Republican | Jim Hoops | 21,382 | 49.01 |
| Total votes | | 43,624 | 100.0 |

== District 3 ==
2026 Ohio's 3rd senatorial district election

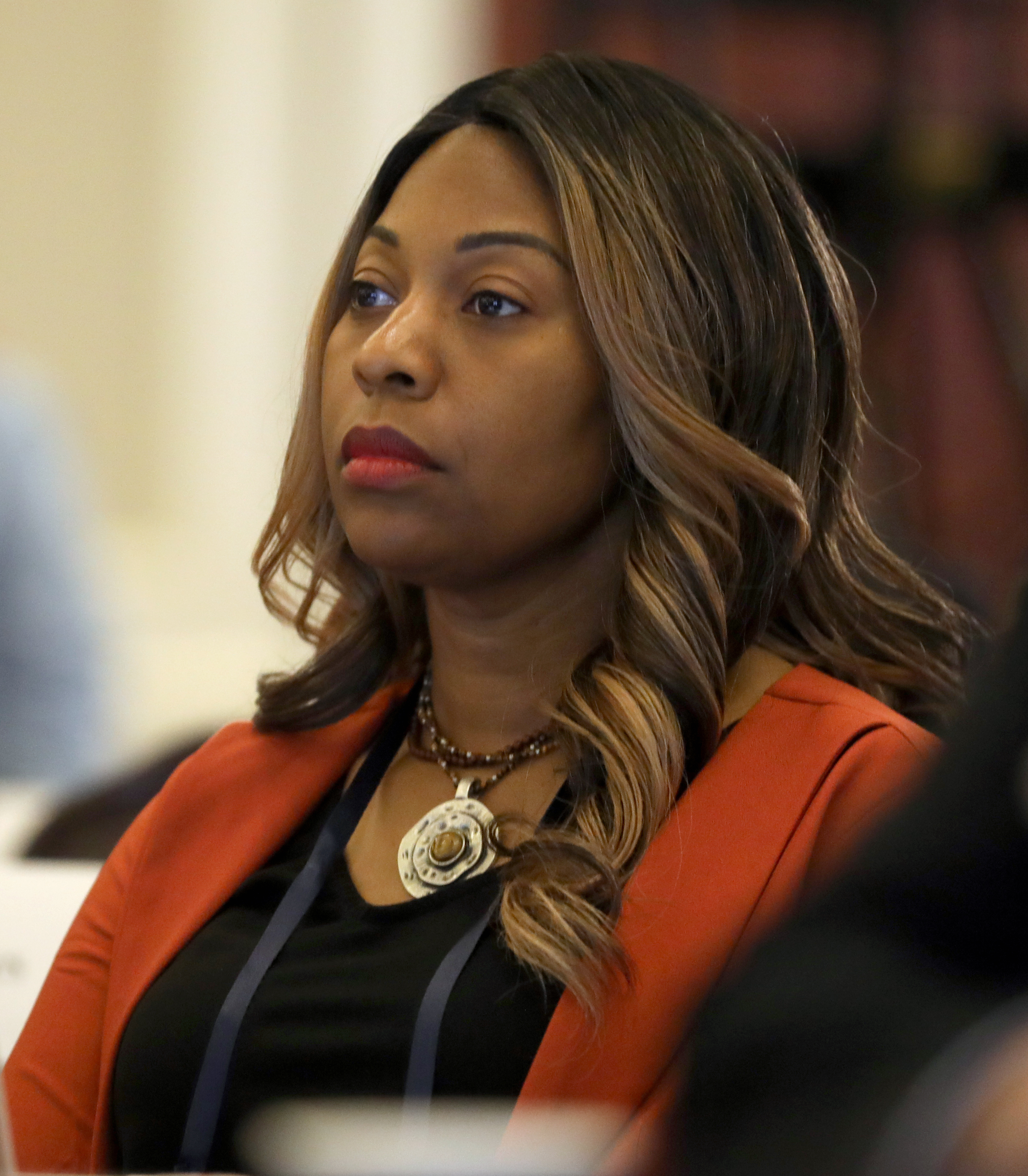
| Nominee | Stacie Baker | Michele Reynolds |
| Party | Democratic | Republican |
| Popular vote | 67,544 | 62,839 |
| Percentage | 51.8% | 48.2% |
Senator before election
Michele Reynolds
Republican
Elected Senator
Stacie Baker
Democratic

The 3rd district includes the southern half of Franklin County and all of Madison and Pickaway counties. The incumbent is Republican Michele Reynolds, who was elected with 52.7% of the vote in 2022.

=== Republican primary ===
==== Candidates ====
===== Nominee =====
- Michele Reynolds, incumbent state senator

==== Results ====
Republican primary results
| Party | Candidate | Votes | % |
|---|---|---|---|
| Republican | Michele Reynolds (incumbent) | 17,678 | 100.0 |
| Total votes | | 17,678 | 100.0 |

=== Democratic primary ===
==== Candidates ====
===== Nominee =====
- Stacie Baker, Reynoldsburg city councilmember (2017–present)

===== Eliminated in primary =====
- Natasha Wheatley-Caffrey, nonprofit professional

==== Results ====
Democratic primary results
| Party | Candidate | Votes | % |
|---|---|---|---|
| Democratic | Stacie Baker | 11,167 | 55.85 |
| Democratic | Natasha Wheatley-Caffrey | 8,826 | 44.15 |
| Total votes | | 19,993 | 100.0 |

== District 5 ==
2026 Ohio's 5th senatorial district election
| Nominee | Phil Plummer | Jeffrey Harris |
| Party | Republican | Democratic |
| Popular vote | 91,119 | 51,071 |
| Percentage | 64.1% | 35.9% |
Senator before election
Steve Huffman
Republican
Elected Senator
Phil Plummer
Republican

The 5th district includes portions of Butler, Darke, and Montgomery counties and all of Miami and Preble counties. The incumbent is Republican Steve Huffman, who is term-limited and cannot run for re-election.

=== Republican primary ===
==== Candidates ====
===== Nominee =====
- Phil Plummer, state representative from the 39th district (2019–present)

===== Did not file =====
- Rodney Creech, state representative from the 40th district (2023–present)

==== Results ====
Republican primary results
| Party | Candidate | Votes | % |
|---|---|---|---|
| Republican | Phil Plummer | 26,868 | 100.0 |
| Total votes | | 26,868 | 100.0 |

=== Democratic primary ===
==== Candidates ====
===== Nominee =====
- Jeffrey Harris

==== Results ====
Democratic primary results
| Party | Candidate | Votes | % |
|---|---|---|---|
| Democratic | Jeffrey Harris (write-in) | 584 | 100.0 |
| Total votes | | 584 | 100.0 |

== District 7 ==
2026 Ohio's 7th senatorial district election
| Nominee | Zac Haines | Cara Jacob |
| Party | Republican | Democratic |
| Popular vote | 88,157 | 78,673 |
| Percentage | 52.8% | 47.2% |
Senator before election
Steve Wilson
Republican
Elected Senator
Zac Haines
Republican

The 7th district includes portions of Hamilton County and all of Warren County. The incumbent is Republican Steve Wilson, who is term-limited and cannot run for re-election.

=== Republican primary ===
==== Candidates ====
===== Nominee =====
- Zac Haines, marketing company CEO

===== Eliminated in primary =====
- Kim Lukens

==== Endorsements ====
Zac Haines

U.S. representatives

- Steve Chabot, former OH-01 (1995–2009, 2011–2023)

==== Results ====
Republican primary results
| Party | Candidate | Votes | % |
|---|---|---|---|
| Republican | Zac Haines | 22,360 | 77.35 |
| Republican | Kim Lukens | 6,549 | 22.65 |
| Total votes | | 28,909 | 100.0 |

=== Democratic primary ===
==== Candidates ====
===== Nominee =====
- Cara Jacob, physician

==== Results ====
Democratic primary results
| Party | Candidate | Votes | % |
|---|---|---|---|
| Democratic | Cara Jacob | 19,095 | 100.0 |
| Total votes | | 19,095 | 100.0 |

== District 9 ==
2026 Ohio's 9th senatorial district election
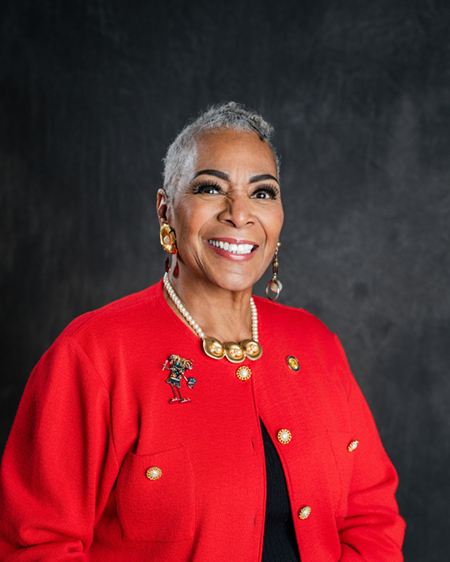

| Nominee | Catherine Ingram | Linda Matthews |
| Party | Democratic | Republican |
| Popular vote | 95,580 | 24,602 |
| Percentage | 79.5% | 20.5% |
Senator before election
Catherine Ingram
Democratic
Elected Senator
Catherine Ingram
Democratic

The 9th district encompasses the city of Cincinnati. The incumbent is Democrat Catherine Ingram, who was elected with 72.5% of the vote in 2022.

=== Democratic primary ===
==== Candidates ====
===== Nominee =====
- Catherine Ingram, incumbent state senator

==== Results ====
Democratic primary results
| Party | Candidate | Votes | % |
|---|---|---|---|
| Democratic | Catherine Ingram (incumbent) | 29,593 | 100.0 |
| Total votes | | 29,593 | 100.0 |

=== Republican primary ===
==== Candidates ====
===== Nominee =====
- Linda Matthews

==== Results ====
Republican primary results
| Party | Candidate | Votes | % |
|---|---|---|---|
| Republican | Linda Matthews (write-in) | 214 | 100.0 |
| Total votes | | 214 | 100.0 |

== District 11 ==
2026 Ohio's 11th senatorial district election
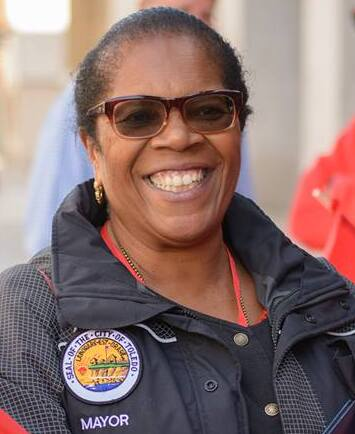

| Nominee | Paula Hicks-Hudson | James Nowak |
| Party | Democratic | Republican |
| Popular vote | 71,502 | 32,277 |
| Percentage | 66.6% | 30.0% |
Senator before election
Paula Hicks-Hudson
Democratic
Elected Senator
Paula Hicks-Hudson
Democratic

The 11th district encompasses the city of Toledo. The incumbent is Democrat Paula Hicks-Hudson, who was elected with 55.1% of the vote in 2022.

=== Democratic primary ===
==== Candidates ====
===== Nominee =====
- Paula Hicks-Hudson, incumbent state senator

==== Results ====
Democratic primary results
| Party | Candidate | Votes | % |
|---|---|---|---|
| Democratic | Paula Hicks-Hudson (incumbent) | 20,711 | 100.0 |
| Total votes | | 20,711 | 100.0 |

=== Republican primary ===
==== Candidates ====
===== Nominee =====
- James Nowak, attorney

==== Results ====
Republican primary results
| Party | Candidate | Votes | % |
|---|---|---|---|
| Republican | James Nowak | 8,565 | 100.0 |
| Total votes | | 8,565 | 100.0 |

=== Libertarian primary ===
==== Candidates ====
===== Nominee =====
- Kenneth Sharp

==== Results ====
Libertarian primary results
| Party | Candidate | Votes | % |
|---|---|---|---|
| Libertarian | Kenneth Sharp | 277 | 100.0 |
| Total votes | | 277 | 100.0 |

== District 13 ==
2026 Ohio's 13th senatorial district election
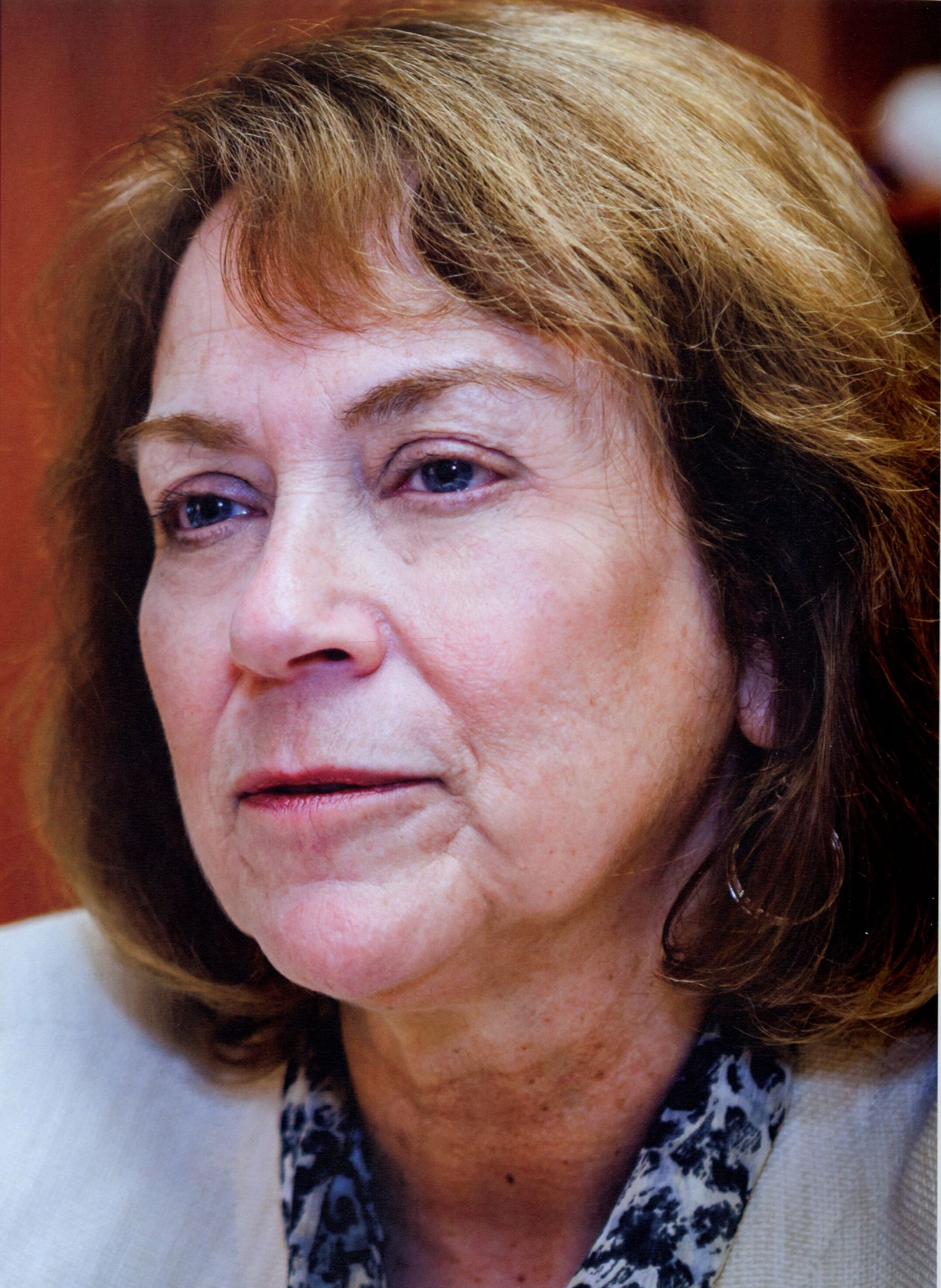

| Nominee | Gayle Manning | Joe Miller |
| Party | Republican | Democratic |
| Popular vote | 74,664 | 72,886 |
| Percentage | 50.6% | 49.4% |
Senator before election
Nathan Manning
Republican
Elected Senator
Gayle Manning
Republican

The 13th district includes all of Lorain County and most of Huron County. The incumbent is Republican Nathan Manning, who is term-limited and cannot run for re-election.

=== Republican primary ===
==== Candidates ====
===== Nominee =====
- Gayle Manning, speaker pro tempore and state representative from the 52nd district (2019-present) (Incumbent Nathan Manning's mother)

==== Results ====
Republican primary results
| Party | Candidate | Votes | % |
|---|---|---|---|
| Republican | Gayle Manning | 20,979 | 100.0 |
| Total votes | | 20,979 | 100.0 |

=== Democratic primary ===
==== Candidates ====
===== Nominee =====
- Joe Miller, state representative from the 53rd district (2019–present)

==== Results ====
Democratic primary results
| Party | Candidate | Votes | % |
|---|---|---|---|
| Democratic | Joe Miller | 24,808 | 100.0 |
| Total votes | | 24,808 | 100.0 |

== District 15 ==
2026 Ohio's 15th senatorial district election
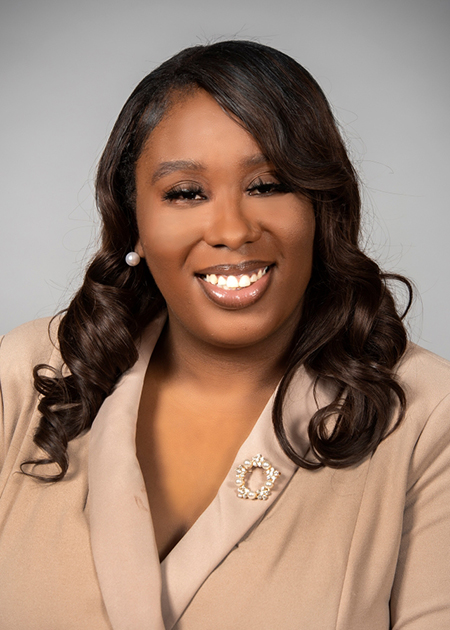

| Nominee | Latyna Humphrey | Joseph Healy |
| Party | Democratic | Republican |
| Popular vote | 92,771 | 16,340 |
| Percentage | 85.0% | 15.0% |
Senator before election
Hearcel Craig
Democratic
Elected Senator
Latyna Humphrey
Democratic

The 15th district encompasses the city of Columbus. The incumbent is Democrat Hearcel Craig, who is term-limited and cannot run for re-election.

=== Democratic primary ===
==== Candidates ====
===== Nominee =====
- Latyna Humphrey, state representative from the 2nd district (2023–present)

==== Results ====
Democratic primary results
| Party | Candidate | Votes | % |
|---|---|---|---|
| Democratic | Latyna Humphrey | 28,462 | 100.0 |
| Total votes | | 28,462 | 100.0 |

=== Republican primary ===
==== Candidates ====
===== Nominee =====
- Joseph Healy

==== Results ====
Republican primary results
| Party | Candidate | Votes | % |
|---|---|---|---|
| Republican | Joseph Healy | 3,841 | 100.0 |
| Total votes | | 3,841 | 100.0 |

== District 17 ==
2026 Ohio's 17th senatorial district election
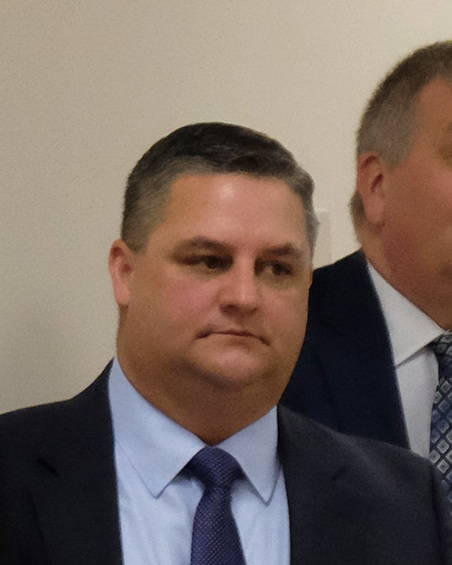

| Nominee | Shane Wilkin | Brian Deer |
| Party | Republican | Democratic |
| Popular vote | 75,278 | 35,070 |
| Percentage | 68.2% | 31.8% |
Senator before election
Shane Wilkin
Republican
Elected Senator
Shane Wilkin
Republican

The 17th district includes a portion of Perry County and all of Fayette, Highland, Hocking, Gallia, Jackson, Lawrence, Pike, Ross, and Vinton counties. The incumbent is Republican Shane Wilkin, who was elected with 74.4% of the vote in 2022.

=== Republican primary ===
==== Candidates ====
===== Nominee =====
- Shane Wilkin, incumbent state senator

==== Results ====
Republican primary results
| Party | Candidate | Votes | % |
|---|---|---|---|
| Republican | Shane Wilkin (incumbent) | 24,283 | 100.0 |
| Total votes | | 24,283 | 100.0 |

=== Democratic primary ===
==== Candidates ====
===== Nominee =====
- Brian Deer, coach

Democratic primary results
| Party | Candidate | Votes | % |
|---|---|---|---|
| Democratic | Brian Deer | 9,436 | 100.0 |
| Total votes | | 9,436 | 100.0 |

== District 19 ==
2026 Ohio's 19th senatorial district election
| Nominee | Ryan Rivers | Scott Charland (replacing Janet Wagner) |
| Party | Republican | Democratic |
| Popular vote | 89,151 | 70,665 |
| Percentage | 55.8% | 44.2% |
Senator before election
Andrew Brenner
Republican
Elected Senator
Ryan Rivers
Republican

The 19th district includes all of Coshocton, Delaware, Holmes, and Knox counties. The incumbent is Republican Andrew Brenner, who is term-limited and cannot run for re-election.

=== Republican primary ===
==== Candidates ====
===== Nominee =====
- Ryan Rivers, former Orange township trustee

===== Eliminated in primary =====
- Beth Lear, state representative from the 61st district (2023–present)

==== Results ====
Republican primary results
| Party | Candidate | Votes | % |
|---|---|---|---|
| Republican | Ryan Rivers | 18,344 | 51.84 |
| Republican | Beth Lear | 17,042 | 48.16 |
| Total votes | | 35,386 | 100.0 |

=== Democratic primary ===
==== Candidates ====
===== Replacement nominee =====
- Scott Charland

===== Withdrew after nomination =====
- Janet Wagner

==== Results ====
Democratic primary results
| Party | Candidate | Votes | % |
|---|---|---|---|
| Democratic | Janet Wagner | 17,874 | 100.0 |
| Total votes | | 17,874 | 100.0 |

== District 21 ==
2026 Ohio's 21st senatorial district election
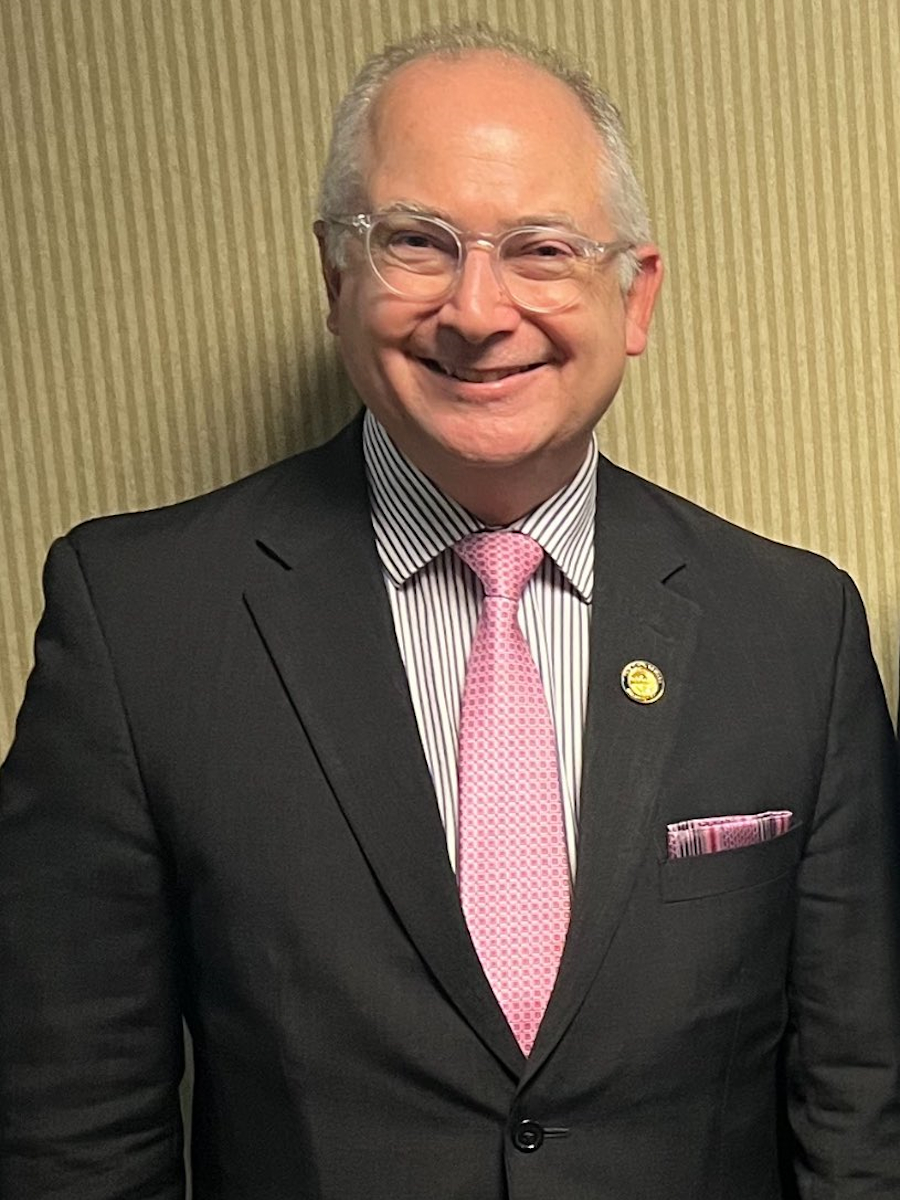

| Nominee | Kent Smith | Mikhail Alterman |
| Party | Democratic | Republican |
| Popular vote | 117,874 | 16,916 |
| Percentage | 87.5% | 12.5% |
Senator before election
Kent Smith
Democratic
Elected Senator
Kent Smith
Democratic

The 21st district includes the cities of Beachwood, Cleveland Heights, Euclid, Garfield Heights, Shaker Heights, and Warrensville Heights in suburban Cleveland. The incumbent is Democrat Kent Smith, who was elected with 82.8% of the vote in 2022.

=== Democratic primary ===
==== Candidates ====
===== Nominee =====
- Kent Smith, incumbent state senator

===== Eliminated in primary =====
- Delores Ford, member of the Ohio State Board of Education from the 11th district (2025–present)

==== Results ====
Democratic primary results
| Party | Candidate | Votes | % |
|---|---|---|---|
| Democratic | Kent Smith (incumbent) | 30,445 | 68.09 |
| Democratic | Delores Ford | 14,271 | 31.91 |
| Total votes | | 44,716 | 100.0 |

=== Republican primary ===
==== Candidates ====
===== Nominee =====
- Mikhail Alterman, nominee for this district in 2022

==== Results ====
Republican primary results
| Party | Candidate | Votes | % |
|---|---|---|---|
| Republican | Mikhail Alterman | 3,401 | 100.0 |
| Total votes | | 3,401 | 100.0 |

== District 23 ==
2026 Ohio's 23rd senatorial district election
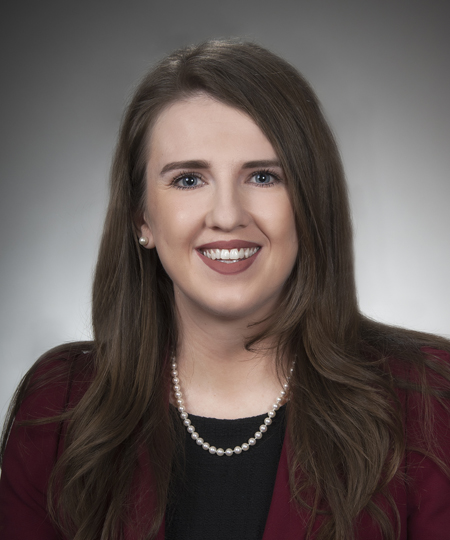

| Nominee | Bride Rose Sweeney | Robert Dintaman |
| Party | Democratic | Republican |
| Popular vote | 94,458 | 26,491 |
| Percentage | 78.1% | 21.9% |
Senator before election
Nickie Antonio
Democratic
Elected Senator
Bride Rose Sweeney
Democratic

The 23rd district encompasses the cities of Cleveland, Lakewood, and Westlake. The incumbent is Democrat Nickie Antonio, the minority leader of the Ohio Senate, who is term-limited and cannot run for re-election.

=== Democratic primary ===
==== Candidates ====
===== Nominee =====
- Bride Rose Sweeney, state representative from the 16th district (2023–present)

==== Results ====
Democratic primary results
| Party | Candidate | Votes | % |
|---|---|---|---|
| Democratic | Bride Rose Sweeney | 29,023 | 100.0 |
| Total votes | | 29,023 | 100.0 |

=== Republican primary ===
==== Candidates ====
===== Nominee =====
- Robert Dintaman

==== Results ====
Republican primary results
| Party | Candidate | Votes | % |
|---|---|---|---|
| Republican | Robert Dintaman | 6,008 | 100.0 |
| Total votes | | 6,008 | 100.0 |

== District 25 ==
2026 Ohio's 25th senatorial district election

| Nominee | Bill DeMora | Don Roberts |
| Party | Democratic | Republican |
| Popular vote | 89,559 | 34,116 |
| Percentage | 72.4% | 27.6% |
Senator before election
Bill DeMora
Democratic
Elected Senator
Bill DeMora
Democratic

The 25th district encompasses the communities of Upper Arlington and Minerva Park. The incumbent is Democrat Bill DeMora, who was elected with 72.6% of the vote in 2022.

=== Democratic primary ===
==== Candidates ====
===== Nominee =====
- Bill DeMora, incumbent state senator

===== Eliminated in primary =====
- Jesse Baker

==== Results ====
Democratic primary results
| Party | Candidate | Votes | % |
|---|---|---|---|
| Democratic | Bill DeMora (incumbent) | 16,103 | 56.14 |
| Democratic | Jesse Baker | 12,582 | 43.86 |
| Total votes | | 28,685 | 100.0 |

=== Republican primary ===
==== Candidates ====
===== Nominee =====
- Don Roberts, attorney

==== Results ====
Republican primary results
| Party | Candidate | Votes | % |
|---|---|---|---|
| Republican | Don Roberts | 8,142 | 100.0 |
| Total votes | | 8,142 | 100.0 |

== District 27 ==
2026 Ohio's 27th senatorial district election

| Nominee | Mike Roberto | Steve Demetriou |
| Party | Democratic | Republican |
| Popular vote | 86,651 | 75,194 |
| Percentage | 53.5% | 46.5% |
Senator before election
Kristina Roegner
Republican
Elected Senator
Mike Roberto
Democratic

The 27th district includes all of Portage County, as well as portions of Geauga and Summit counties. The incumbent is Republican Kristina Roegner, who is term-limited and cannot run for re-election.

=== Republican primary ===
==== Candidates ====
===== Nominee =====
- Steve Demetriou, state representative from the 35th district (2023–present)

==== Results ====
Republican primary results
| Party | Candidate | Votes | % |
|---|---|---|---|
| Republican | Steve Demetriou | 21,809 | 100.0 |
| Total votes | | 21,809 | 100.0 |

=== Democratic primary ===
==== Candidates ====
===== Nominee =====
- Mike Roberto, former superintendent of the Aurora City School District (2020–2023)

==== Results ====
Democratic primary results
| Party | Candidate | Votes | % |
|---|---|---|---|
| Democratic | Mike Roberto | 27,632 | 100.0 |
| Total votes | | 27,632 | 100.0 |

== District 29 ==
2026 Ohio's 29th senatorial district election

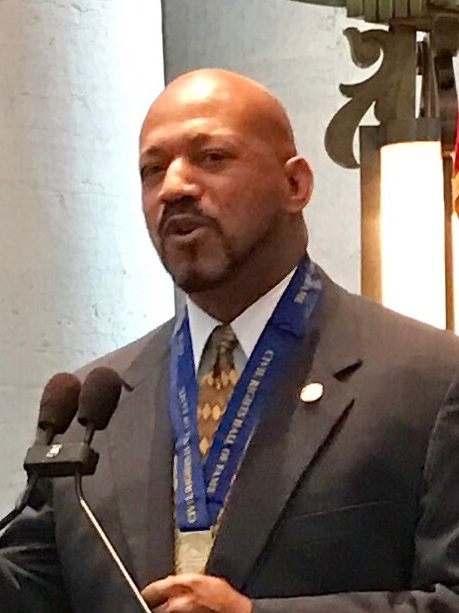
| Nominee | Jane Timken | Thomas West |
| Party | Republican | Democratic |
| Popular vote | 74,864 | 61,071 |
| Percentage | 55.1% | 44.9% |
Senator before election
Jane Timken
Republican
Elected Senator
Jane Timken
Republican

The 29th district includes most of Stark County, including the communities of Alliance, Canton, Massillon, and Waynesburg. The incumbent is Republican Jane Timken, who was appointed to the Senate in January 2025 following the death of Kirk Schuring. Schuring was re-elected with no formal opposition in 2022.

=== Republican primary ===
==== Candidates ====
===== Nominee =====
- Jane Timken, incumbent state senator

==== Results ====
Republican primary results
| Party | Candidate | Votes | % |
|---|---|---|---|
| Republican | Jane Timken (incumbent) | 26,068 | 100.0 |
| Total votes | | 26,068 | 100.0 |

=== Democratic primary ===
==== Candidates ====
===== Nominee =====
- Thomas West, former state representative from the 49th district (2017–2023)

==== Results ====
Democratic primary results
| Party | Candidate | Votes | % |
|---|---|---|---|
| Democratic | Thomas West | 22,087 | 100.0 |
| Total votes | | 22,087 | 100.0 |

=== Libertarian primary ===
==== Candidates ====
===== Failed to qualify =====
- Zach Moore

==== Results ====
Libertarian primary results
| Party | Candidate | Votes | % |
|---|---|---|---|
| Libertarian | Zach Moore (write-in) | 3 | 100.0 |
| Total votes | | 3 | 100.0 |

== District 31 ==
2026 Ohio's 31st senatorial district election
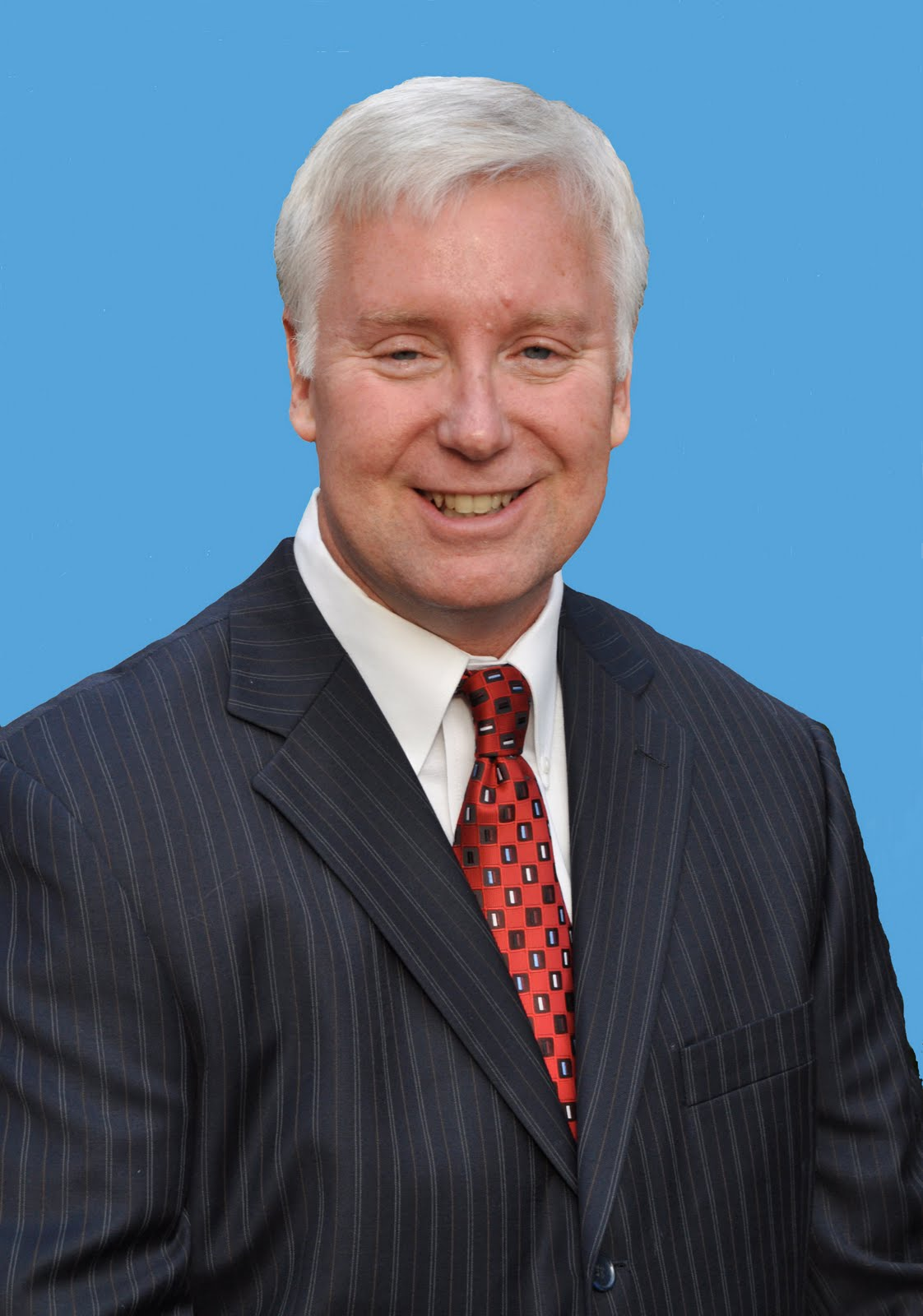

| Nominee | Al Landis | Laura Sirot |
| Party | Republican | Democratic |
| Popular vote | 77,748 | 40,852 |
| Percentage | 65.6% | 34.4% |
Senator before election
Al Landis
Republican
Elected Senator
Al Landis
Republican

The 31st district includes all of Muskingum, Tuscarawas, and Wayne counties, as well as portions of Guernsey and Stark counties. The incumbent is Republican Al Landis, who was elected with no formal opposition in 2022.

=== Republican primary ===
==== Candidates ====
===== Nominee =====
- Al Landis, incumbent state senator

==== Results ====
Republican primary results
| Party | Candidate | Votes | % |
|---|---|---|---|
| Republican | Al Landis (incumbent) | 22,286 | 100.0 |
| Total votes | | 22,286 | 100.0 |

=== Democratic primary ===
==== Candidates ====
===== Nominee =====
- Laura Sirot

==== Results ====
Democratic primary results
| Party | Candidate | Votes | % |
|---|---|---|---|
| Democratic | Laura Sirot | 11,777 | 100.0 |
| Total votes | | 11,777 | 100.0 |

== District 33 ==
2026 Ohio's 31st senatorial district election
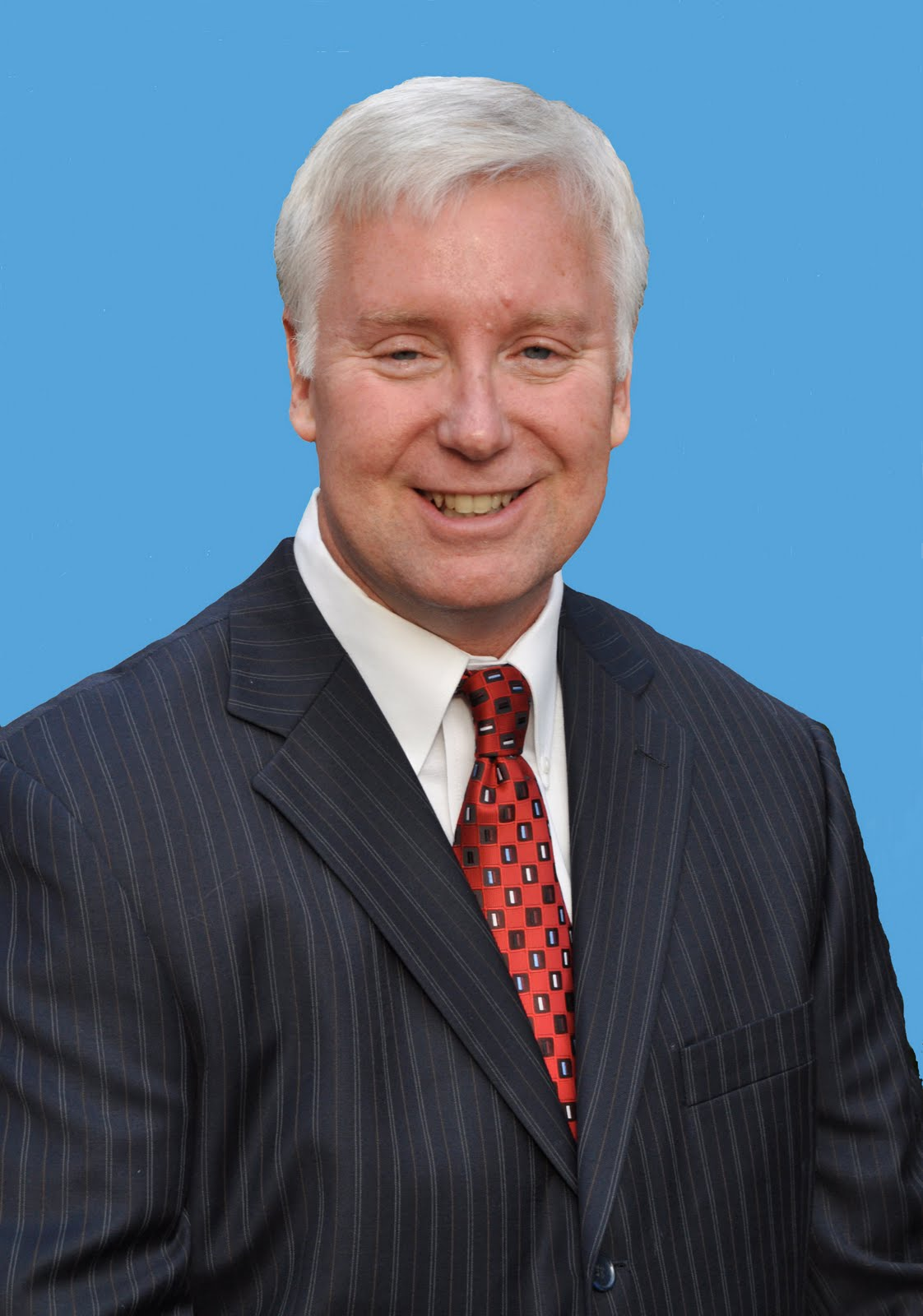

| Nominee | Al Cutrona | Michael Kripchak |
| Party | Republican | Democratic |
| Popular vote | 72,249 | 60,380 |
| Percentage | 54.5% | 45.5% |
Senator before election
Al Cutrona
Republican
Elected Senator
Al Cutrona
Republican

The 33rd district includes all of Carroll, Columbiana, and Mahoning counties. The incumbent is Republican Al Cutrona, who was elected with 60.9% of the vote in 2024.

=== Republican primary ===
==== Candidates ====
===== Nominee =====
- Al Cutrona, incumbent state senator

==== Results ====
Republican primary results
| Party | Candidate | Votes | % |
|---|---|---|---|
| Republican | Al Cutrona (incumbent) | 22,963 | 100.0 |
| Total votes | | 22,963 | 100.0 |

=== Democratic primary ===
==== Nominee ====
- Michael Kripchak, businessman and former congressional candidate

==== Results ====
Democratic primary results
| Party | Candidate | Votes | % |
|---|---|---|---|
| Democratic | Michael Kripchak | 20,087 | 100.0 |
| Total votes | | 20,087 | 100.0 |
