= 2022 Ohio Senate election =

- November 8, 2022

17 of the 33 seats in the Ohio Senate 17 seats needed for a majority
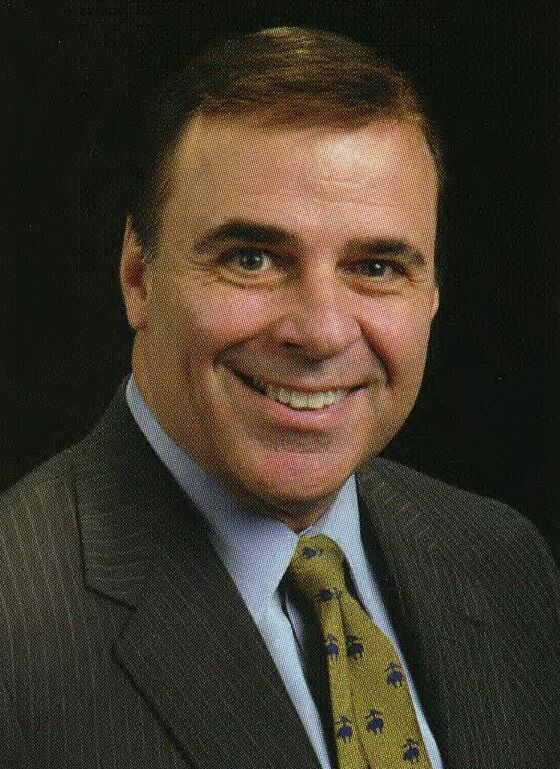

	Majority party	Minority party
Leader	Kirk Schuring	Kenny Yuko (term-limited)
Party	Republican	Democratic
Leader since	January 4, 2021	April 26, 2017
Leader's seat	29th–Canton	25th–Richmond Heights
Last election	15 seats, 61.48%	1 seat, 38.45%
Seats before	25	8
Seats won	11	6
Seats after	26	7
Seat change	▲1	▼1
Popular vote	1,105,112	812,696
Percentage	57.43%	42.23%
Swing	▲10.17%	▼10.18%
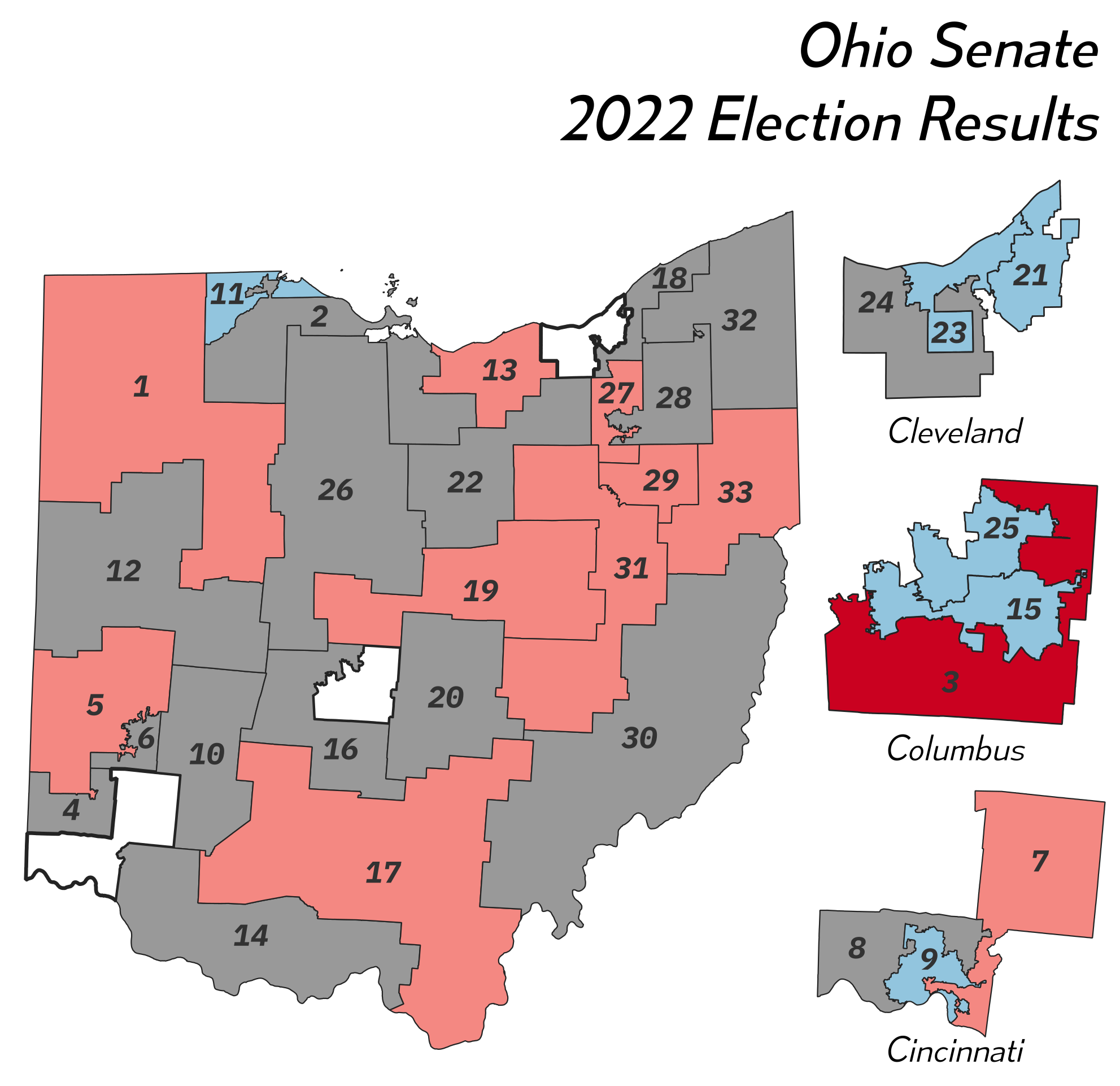
- Results; Democratic hold Republican hold Republican gain Not up for election
President of the Senate before election
Matt Huffman
Republican
Elected President of the Senate
Matt Huffman
Republican

The 2022 Ohio Senate elections were held on November 8, 2022, to elect senators in 17 odd-numbered districts of the Ohio Senate. Members were elected in single-member constituencies to four-year terms. These elections were held concurrently with various federal and state elections, including for Governor of Ohio and the Ohio House of Representatives.

Although primary elections were originally scheduled for May 3, they were postponed to August 2 after the Supreme Court of Ohio rejected state legislative maps approved by the state redistricting commission as part of the 2020 redistricting cycle.

== Predictions ==
Source	Ranking	As of
Sabato's Crystal Ball	Safe R	May 19, 2022

== Overview ==
Party	Candidates	Votes			Seats won		
Party	Candidates	No.	%	+/-	No.	+/-	%
Republican	16	1,105,112	57.43	▲10.17	11	▲1	64.71
Democratic	13	812,696	42.23	▼10.18	6	▼1	35.29
Other	2	6,472	0.34	▲0.02	0	Steady	0.00
Total	31		100.00		17		17

Popular vote
Republican	57.43%
Democratic	42.23%
Other	0.34%

Senate seats won
Republican	64.71%
Democratic	35.29%

== Results by district ==
=== Summary ===
District	Incumbent status	Incumbent	Winner	Result
1st	Running	Rob McColley		Incumbent Republican re-elected
3rd	Running	Tina Maharath	Michele Reynolds	Republican gain
5th	Running	Steve Huffman		Incumbent Republican re-elected
7th	Running	Steve Wilson		Incumbent Republican re-elected
9th	Term-limited	Cecil Thomas	Catherine Ingram	Democratic hold
11th	N/A	Vacant (Note: Incumbent Democrat Teresa Fedor resigned October 31, 2022. Paula Hicks-Hudson was appointed to fill the vacancy after her victory in the general election.)	Paula Hicks-Hudson	Democratic hold
13th	Running	Nathan Manning		Incumbent Republican re-elected
15th	Running	Hearcel Craig		Incumbent Democrat re-elected
17th	Term-limited	Bob Peterson	Shane Wilkin	Republican hold
19th	Running	Andrew Brenner		Incumbent Republican re-elected
21st	Not running	Dale Martin	Kent Smith	Democratic hold
23rd	Running	Nickie Antonio		Incumbent Democrat re-elected
25th	N/A	None (Note: This district was reassigned to Franklin County from Cuyahoga County following redistricting. The previous incumbent was Democrat Kenny Yuko, who was term-limited.)	Bill DeMora	Democratic notional hold
27th	Running	Kristina Roegner		Incumbent Republican re-elected
29th	Running	Kirk Schuring		Incumbent Republican re-elected
31st	Term-limited	Jay Hottinger	Al Landis	Republican hold
33rd	Running	Michael Rulli		Incumbent Republican re-elected

=== Detailed results ===
District results by vote share

==== District 1 ====
The 1st district is based in Northwest Ohio stretching south to the cities of Findlay, Ottawa and Van Wert. The incumbent was Republican Rob McColley, who would become the Majority Leader of the Ohio Senate. McColley was first elected in 2016. He was re-elected in 2022.

Ohio Senate District 1 elections, 2022
Republican primary
Party	Candidate	Votes	%
Republican	Rob McColley (incumbent)	11,523	100.0
Total votes		11,523	100.0
General election
Republican	Rob McColley (incumbent)	104,274	100.0
Total votes		104,274	100.0
Republican hold		Swing	▲26.7 (Note: Seat was contested in the previous election.)

==== District 3 ====
The 3rd district is based in Franklin County stretching around the county from Prairie Township in the west of the county through Grove City, Reynoldsburg, Gahanna and north to the wealthy suburbs of New Albany and Westerville. The incumbent was Democrat Tina Maharath, who was first elected in 2018. She was defeated in 2022 by Republican Michele Reynolds.

Ohio Senate District 3 elections, 2022
Democratic primary
Party	Candidate	Votes	%
Democratic	Tina Maharath (incumbent)	6,848	100.0
Total votes		6,848	100.0
Republican primary
Party	Candidate	Votes	%
Republican	Michele Reynolds	6,327	100.0
Total votes		6,327	100.0
General election
Republican	Michele Reynolds	61,723	52.4
Democratic	Tina Maharath (incumbent)	56,023	47.6
Total votes		117,746	100.0
Republican gain from Democratic		Swing	▲2.7

==== District 5 ====
The 5th district is based in Montgomery County stretching north to include Piqua and Troy and south to include Eaton and Trenton. The incumbent was Republican Steve Huffman, who was first elected in 2018. He was re-elected in 2022.

Ohio Senate District 5 elections, 2022
Republican primary
Party	Candidate	Votes	%
Republican	Steve Huffman (incumbent)	9,132	100.0
Total votes		9,132	100.0
General election
Republican	Steve Huffman (incumbent)	99,741	96.4
Independent	Nancy Kiehl (write-in)	3,742	3.6
Total votes		103,483	100.0
Republican hold		Swing	▲43.5

==== District 7 ====
The 7th district is based in Cincinnati stretching through Eastern Hamilton County and north to include all of Warren County. The incumbent was Republican Steve Wilson, who was first elected in 2016. He was re-elected in 2022.

Ohio Senate District 7 elections, 2022
Democratic primary
Party	Candidate	Votes	%
Democratic	David Dallas	9,622	100.0
Total votes		9,622	100.0
Republican primary
Party	Candidate	Votes	%
Republican	Steve Wilson (incumbent)	13,497	99.3
Republican	Austin Kaiser (write-in)	92	0.7
Total votes		13,589	100.0
General election
Republican	Steve Wilson (incumbent)	95,414	61.6
Democratic	David Dallas	59,563	38.4
Total votes		154,977	100.0
Republican hold		Swing	▲4.5

==== District 9 ====
The 9th district is based in Cincinnati stretching north to include most of Springfield Township. The incumbent was Democrat Cecil Thomas, who was first elected in 2014. Democrat Catherine Ingram was nominated as the Democratic candidate in the March primary. She was elected in 2022.

Ohio Senate District 9 elections, 2022
Democratic primary
Party	Candidate	Votes	%
Democratic	Catherine Ingram	11,112	100.0
Total votes		11,112	100.0
Republican primary
Party	Candidate	Votes	%
Republican	Orlando Sonza Jr.	2,892	100.0
Total votes		2,892	100.0
General election
Democratic	Catherine Ingram	78,639	72.8
Republican	Orlando Sonza Jr.	29,418	27.2
Total votes		102,057	100.0
Democratic hold		Swing	▼3.5

==== District 11 ====
Ohio Senate District 11 elections, 2022
Democratic primary
Party	Candidate	Votes	%
Democratic	Paula Hicks-Hudson	10,210	100.0
Total votes		10,210	100.0
Republican primary
Party	Candidate	Votes	%
Republican	Tony Dia	5,202	100.0
Total votes		5,202	100.0
General election
Democratic	Paula Hicks-Hudson	64,761	55.3
Republican	Tony Dia	52,384	44.7
Total votes		117,145	100.0
Democratic hold		Swing	▼14.1

==== District 13 ====
Ohio Senate District 13 elections, 2022
Democratic primary
Party	Candidate	Votes	%
Democratic	Anthony Eliopoulos	7,422	100.0
Total votes		7,422	100.0
Republican primary
Party	Candidate	Votes	%
Republican	Nathan Manning (incumbent)	8,910	67.3
Republican	Kirsten Hill	4,321	32.7
Total votes		13,231	100.0
General election
Republican	Nathan Manning (incumbent)	74,213	57.7
Democratic	Anthony Eliopoulos	54,417	42.3
Total votes		128,630	100.0
Republican hold		Swing	▲5.0

=== Close races ===
Seats where the margin of victory was under 10%:

1. District 27, 2.22%
2. District 3, 4.84% (gain)

== Outgoing incumbents ==
=== Republicans ===
- District 17: Bob Peterson was term-limited.
- District 31: Jay Hottinger was term-limited.

=== Democrats ===
- District 9: Cecil Thomas was term-limited.
- District 11: Teresa Fedor retired to run for lieutenant governor of Ohio.
- District 21: Sandra Williams was term-limited.
- District 25: Kenny Yuko was term-limited.

== See also ==
- 2022 Ohio elections
- List of Ohio state legislatures
