= Mike Roberto =

American politician

Member-elect of the Ohio Senate from the 27th district
- Assuming office January 4, 2027
- Succeeding: Kristina Roegner

Personal details
- Born: Ravenna, Ohio, U.S.
- Party: Democratic

Mike Roberto is an American politician. He is the Democratic member-elect of the Ohio Senate from the 27th district, succeeding term-limited Kristina Roegner. Prior to his victory, he was a schoolteacher and administrator who served as superintendent of Aurora City School District from 2020 to 2025.

== Biography ==
Roberto was born and raised in Ravenna, Ohio; he was part of a family of teachers, with both of them in the profession. He attended Ravenna High School, graduating in 1987. He was a keen high school athlete at Ravenna: he reached the 1985-1986 All-Metropolitan League wrestling team after a 19-2 season, and played American football for the Ravens, receiving a 1986 All-Metropolitan League honorable mention. He was also inducted to the National Honor Society, reaching a tenth-place ranking in his senior class.

Roberto attended Kent State University, where he obtained a BS in education, a master's degree in secondary educational administration, and education specialist degree. While at Kent State, he wrestled for the Golden Flashes, serving as their captain for the freshman year and being one of their nine area grapplers for the sophomore year, and was an assistant wrestling coach.

Roberto worked at several high schools, including his alma mater. In 1999, he joined the Aurora City School District, where he taught science. He later became an administrator around 2002, becoming principal of Aurora High School and eventually became assistant superintendent of curriculum and instruction. He became superintendent on August 1, 2020, succeeding Pat Ciccantelli. In July 2025, he retired as superintendent, and was succeeded by assistant superintendent of curriculum and instruction Paul Milcetich.

Roberto ran in the 2026 Ohio Senate election in the 27th district, held by term-limited Republican Kristina Roegner. He won the May 5 Democratic primary unopposed. During the general election, Roberto cited the cost of living and data centers as key issues. He defeated state representative Steve Demetriou, the Republican candidate, by seven percentages. He and Stacie Baker were the two Democrats who flipped State Senate seats amidst a "blue wave" in the 2026 midterm elections.

Roberto has four children with his wife Lisa, an educator.

Originally living in Aurora when their children were minors, they have since moved to Kent.
