= Stacie Baker =

American politician

- Baker speaking at a lectern during the 2026 midterm election

Member-elect of the Ohio Senate from the 3rd district
- Assuming office January 2027
- Succeeding: Michele Reynolds

Personal details
- Party: Democratic

Stacie Baker is an American politician. He is the Democratic member-elect of the Ohio Senate from the 3rd district. Prior to his election, he was Franklin County government official and a member of Reynoldsburg City Council.

== Biography ==
Baker was born in 1981/1982 and raised in Columbus, Ohio, attending Independence High School on the Southeast side. He graduated with a bachelor's degree from Ohio State University and a Master’s in Public Administration from Ohio University.

In 2009/2010, Baker started working as an official in the Franklin County government, a service he would continue for at least sixteen years. He was elected to Reynoldsburg City Council in 2017, and was elected to two more terms in 2021 and 2025. While on Reynoldsburg City Council, Baker has served the city in such roles as serving on the West Licking County Fire Board. In April 2026, he opposed a city-wide ban on short-term rentals due to concerns about negative effects on local revenue.

Baker ran in the 2026 Ohio Senate election in the 3rd district, which had a lean towards Republicans at the time. He subsequently defeated Natasha Wheatley-Caffery for the Democratic Party nomination, 56% to 44%. He defeated Michele Reynolds in the general election; he and Mike Roberto were the two Democrats who flipped State Senate seats amidst a "blue wave" in the 2026 midterms.
