= Ryan Rivers =

American politician

Member-elect of the Ohio Senate from the 19th district
- Assuming office January 4, 2027
- Succeeding: Andrew Brenner

Trustee of Orange Township
- In office 2017–2021

Personal details
- Party: Republican
- Children: 2
- Education: Ohio University

Ryan F. Rivers is an American politician who is the member-elect of the Ohio Senate from the 19th district. A member of the Republican Party, Rivers previously has served as a Trustee from Orange Township from 2017 to 2021.

Rivers is a graduate of Ohio University with a degree in communications.
