= Tina Maharath =

American politician (born 1990)

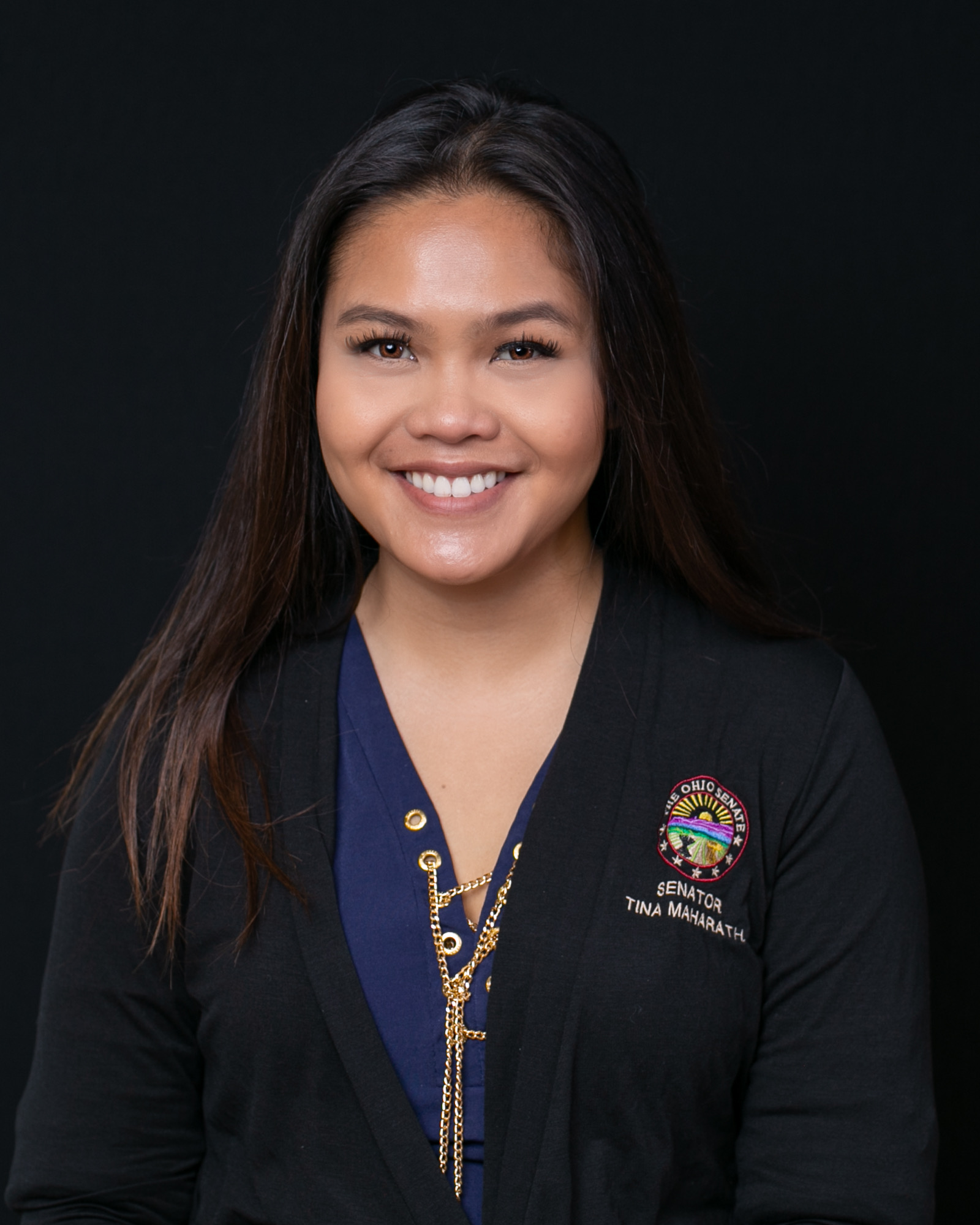
- Maharath in 2020

Member of the Ohio Senate from the 3rd district
- In office January 7, 2019 – January 3, 2023
- Preceded by: Kevin Bacon
- Succeeded by: Michele Reynolds

Personal details
- Born: November 30, 1990 (age 35) Whitehall, Ohio, U.S.
- Party: Democratic
- Children: 2
- Education: Ohio University (B.A., M.A.)

Tina Maharath (Lao: ຕີນາ ມະຫາລາດ) (born November 30, 1990) is an American politician who served as an Ohio State Senator from the 3rd District from 2019 until 2023. She also served in the Senate Democrats leadership team as Minority Whip.

As a Democrat, Maharath won 2018 election to the Senate in a highly close race with Republican opponent Anne Gonzales, flipping the 3rd Senate District from the Republicans. Maharath's victory represented the first time Ohio Democrats had won a Republican held State Senate seat since 2006. She is also the first Asian-American woman in the Ohio State Legislature and the first Laotian-American elected into public office.

Maharath lost re-election in 2022 to Michele Reynolds.

== Personal life ==
Maharath is from Whitehall, Ohio, the daughter of Laotian refugees. Her father served the U.S. Army under the Laos Army while her mother worked as a nurse in the Laos Army. She is a third-generation politician, and the first woman to hold office in her family. Maharath has a Bachelor's degree in political science and a Master's degree in Law, Justice and Culture from Ohio University.

== Ohio State Senate ==
In 2018, Maharath was elected to the Ohio State Senate by 705 votes. During her time in the Senate she sponsored legislation that would prohibit conversion therapy for minors, create an Asian-American and Pacific Islander Affairs Commission, and designate Maternal Mortality Awareness Month.

During her time in the Senate, Maharath had been elected by her fellow Democratic colleagues to their leadership team as Assistant Minority Whip then Minority Whip. In the 2022 election, Maharath lost to Republican Michele Reynolds.

=== Committee assignments ===
- Committee on Financial Institutions and Technology (Ranking Member)
- Local Government and Elections (Ranking Member)
- Agriculture and Natural Resources
- Insurance
- Rules and Reference
- Transportation

Committees served under the 133rd General Assembly:

- Local Government, Veterans Affair, Public Safety (Ranking Member)
- Higher Education
- Transportation, Commerce and Workforce
- Health, Human Services and Medicaid
- Education
- Agriculture and Natural Resources

== Electoral history ==
Election results
Year	Office	Election	Votes for Maharath	%	Opponent	Party	Votes	%
2018	Ohio State Senate	Primary	11,462	71.81	Katherine Chipps	Democratic	4,500	28.19
2018	Ohio State Senate	General	66,438	50.27	Anne Gonzales	Republican	65,733	49.73
2022	Ohio State Senate	General	56,023	47.58	Michele Reynolds	Republican	61,723	52.42
