= Joe Miller (Ohio politician) =

American politician (born 1969)

Member of the Ohio House of Representatives from the 53rd district
- Incumbent
- Assumed office January 7, 2019
- Preceded by: Dan Ramos

Personal details
- Born: June 28, 1969 (age 57)
- Party: Democratic
- Spouse: Kelly Miller
- Education: Lorain County Community College; Bowling Green State University (BS); Ashland University (MEd),(MA)
- Occupation: Educator

Joseph Adam Miller III (born June 28, 1969) is an American educator and politician currently serving as the State Representative for the 53rd district of the Ohio House of Representatives. He is a member of the Democratic Party. His district consists of parts of northern Lorain County. He is a former City Council Member for the city of Amherst, Ohio.

== Political career ==
=== Election ===
Miller was elected in the general election on November 6, 2018, winning 63 percent of the vote over 37 percent of Republican candidate Rob Weber. He would be reelected three more times, and is now term limited in the Ohio House of Representatives. Miller is currently a candidate for Ohio's 13th senatorial district in the upcoming 2026 Ohio Senate election.

=== Committees ===
Miller is a member of the following committees in the 136th GA: Workforce and Higher Education, Education, Public Pensions and Insurance, and he is the ranking member on Agriculture.

== Election history ==
Ohio House 53rd District
Year	Democrat	Votes	Pct	Republican	Votes	Pct
2018	Joe Miller	25,644	62.9%	Rob Weber	15,136	37.1%
2020	Joe Miller	32,298	59.3%	Bradley Lacko	22,157	40.7%
2022	Joe Miller	21,253	52.1%	Marty Gallagher	19,536	47.9%
2024	Joe Miller	29,205	56.3%	Bradley Lacko	22,695	43.7%
