= Zac Haines =

American politician

Member-elect of the Ohio Senate from the 7th district
- Assuming office January 2027
- Succeeding: Steve Wilson

Personal details
- Party: Republican

Zac Haines is an American politician. A member of the Republican Party, he is the member-elect for the 7th district of the Ohio Senate.
