= Kenny Yuko =

American politician (born 1950)

Minority Leader of the Ohio Senate
- In office April 26, 2017 – December 31, 2022
- Preceded by: Joe Schiavoni
- Succeeded by: Nickie Antonio

Member of the Ohio Senate from the 25th district
- In office January 6, 2015 – December 31, 2022
- Preceded by: Nina Turner
- Succeeded by: Bill DeMora

Member of the Ohio House of Representatives from the 7th district
- In office January 3, 2005 – December 31, 2012
- Preceded by: Ed Jerse
- Succeeded by: Constituency abolished

Personal details
- Born: August 1, 1950 (age 75) Cleveland, Ohio, U.S.
- Party: Democratic
- Education: Cuyahoga Community College; Kent State University

Kenny Yuko (born August 1, 1950) is an American politician and union activist who served as a member of the Ohio Senate, representing the 25th District. Previously, he was a member of the Ohio House of Representatives, representing the 7th District from 2005 to 2012. Yuko was a political and union activist for more than two decades.

== Early life and education ==
Yuko grew up in Euclid, Ohio and graduated from Brush High School. He attended Cuyahoga Community College and Kent State University.

== Career ==
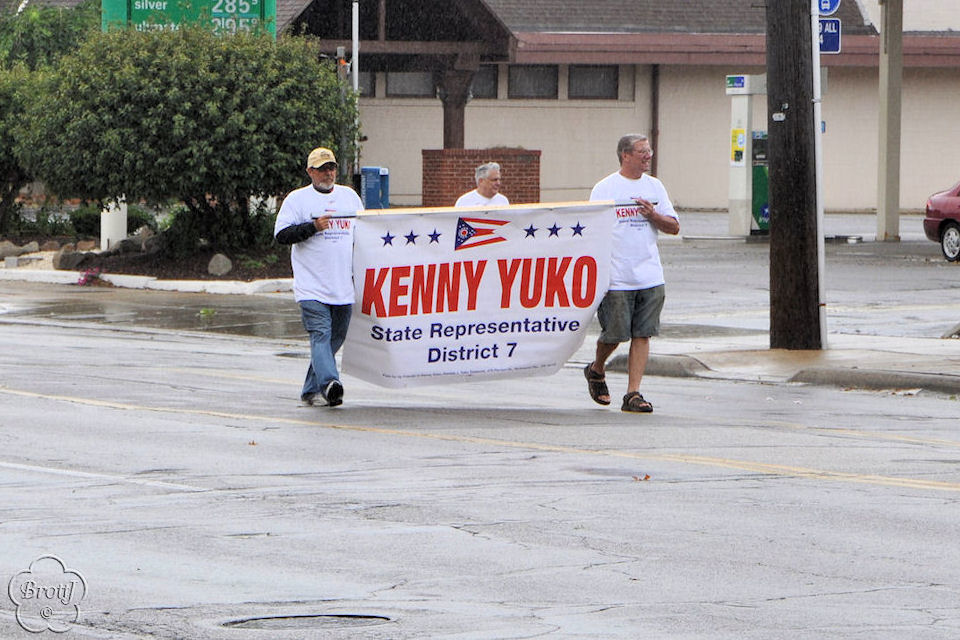
Yuko with supporters marching in the 2010 Euclid Labor Day Parade

Yuko began his career as a buyer for Polsky's Department Store, and went on to the Laborers’ Local #860 for 30 years, including 25 years as union organizer. He retired from that service in 2004.

Yuko first ran for the Ohio House of Representatives in 2004 to replace four-term incumbent Ed Jerse, who was unable to seek re-election due to term limits. In the 2004 primary, he defeated Kent Smith. He won reelection in 2006, 2008, and 2010. Yuko served as Chairman of the Commerce and Labor Committee for the 128th General Assembly.

Yuko expressed interest in an appointment to the Ohio Senate after incumbent Lance Mason resigned to take a judicial position. Ultimately, the appointment went to Cleveland City Councilwoman Nina Turner.

When he was sworn into his fourth term on January 3, 2011, Yuko served as the ranking member of the Commerce and Labor Committee, as well as a member of the Health and Aging Committee, and the Veterans Affairs Committee. He was also a member of the Unemployment Compensation Advisory Council; the Permanent Joint Committee on Gaming and Wagering; and the Joint Committee on Bingo and Skill Based Gaming.

Yuko was a staunch opponent of S.B. 5 and looked to lead the cause of a referendum that would repeal the changes the bill would make upon passage. He believed the then current act trampled the rights of workers.

Yuko served the 25th senatorial district which included the cities of Beachwood, Bedford, Bedford Heights, Cleveland (partial), East Cleveland, Eastlake, Euclid, Maple Heights, Mayfield Heights, Mentor (partial), Mentor-on-the-Lake, Painesville, Pepper Pike, Richmond Heights, South Euclid, Warrensville Heights, Wickliffe, Willoughby, and Willowick; along with the villages of Fairport Harbor, Grand River, Highland Hills, Lakeline, North Randall, Orange, Timberlake, and Woodmere; as well as parts of Painesville Township.

== Abortion legislation ==
In 2019, Yuko was listed as a co-sponsor of Ohio Senate Bill 23, commonly known as the "Heartbeat Bill." The bill prohibits most abortions after the detection of a fetal heartbeat—typically around six weeks into pregnancy—and includes no exceptions for rape or incest. Governor Mike DeWine signed the bill into law on April 11, 2019.

Yuko's appearance as a co-sponsor in official records caused confusion due to his consistent public support for reproductive rights throughout his legislative career. The inclusion may have been procedural or clerical, as it conflicts with his broader legislative positions and votes on abortion access.

In September 2022, a judge in Hamilton County issued a temporary injunction blocking the law’s enforcement, restoring abortion access in Ohio up to 22 weeks of pregnancy while litigation continued.

== Personal life ==
Yuko resides in Richmond Heights, Ohio, with his wife, Pam. They have two children: Angela and the late Kenneth ("Rocky").

Ohio Senate
Preceded by Joe Schiavoni	Minority Leader of the Ohio Senate; 2017–2022	Succeeded by Nickie Antonio
