= Ohio's 3rd senatorial district =

American legislative district

Ohio's 3rd State Senate district
Senator
Michele Reynolds; R–Canal Winchester
- Demographics: 70.6% White; 19.3% Black; 5.1% Hispanic; 2.8% Asian; 2.4% Native American; 0.1% Hawaiian/Pacific Islander
- Population (2020) • Voting age • Citizens of voting age: 362,388; 277,316; 268,466

Ohio's 3rd senatorial district is an area to the south and west of Columbus, including Madison County, Pickaway County, and the southern part of Franklin County. The major cities include London, Range, Mt. Sterling, and Circleville. The district encompasses Ohio House districts 5, 10 and 12, The current Ohio senator is Republican Michele Reynolds and will be succeeded by the Ohio Democratic member-elect Stacie Baker in January 2027.

== The 2026 election results ==
Stacie Baker (D) 67,338 votes 51.9%

Michelle Reynolds (R) 62,450 votes 48.1%

== Historically ==
Before the redistricting of 2023, the 3rd Senatorial District spanned vast portions of central Ohio from the Miami Valley to the Scioto Valley, and encompassed approximately a third of Franklin County. It included Ohio House districts 17, 19 and 20. It has a Cook PVI of R+6. The district was represented by Ted Gray from 1951 to 1994, the longest tenure of any member of the Ohio Senate.

== List of senators ==
Senator	Party	Term	Notes
Ted Gray	Republican	January 3, 1951 – February 2, 1994	Gray retired prior to the expiration of his term.
Bruce E. Johnson	Republican	March 1, 1994 – September 18, 2001	Johnson resigned to join the administration of Governor Bob Taft.
David Goodman	Republican	October 2, 2001 – December 31, 2010	Goodman was term limited after three terms.
Kevin Bacon	Republican	January 3, 2011 – December 31, 2018	Bacon was term limited.
Tina Maharath	Democratic	January 1, 2019 – January 3, 2023	Maharath lost reelection.
Michele Reynolds	Republican	January 3, 2023 –	Incumbent
