= Steve Demetriou =

American politician

Member of the Ohio House of Representatives from the 35th district
- Incumbent
- Assumed office January 1, 2023
- Preceded by: Tavia Galonski

Personal details
- Born: 1989 (age 36–37)
- Party: Republican
- Education: United States Military Academy

Steven James Demetriou (born 1989) is an American politician who has served in the Ohio House of Representatives for the 35th district since 2023. He is a Republican.

== Legislative career ==
During his tenure, Demetriou has focused on legislation related to technology, fiscal policy, and regulatory frameworks affecting emerging markets. He has sponsored and supported legislation addressing blockchain and cryptocurrency policy, including proposals related to the management of digital assets and the potential establishment of a state cryptocurrency reserve.

As of the 136th Ohio General Assembly, Demetriou serves on the following committees:

- Development
- Small Business
- Technology and Innovation
- Ways and Means

== Redistricting and election context ==
Demetriou was elected under state legislative maps that the Ohio Supreme Court ruled unconstitutional in a series of decisions spanning February to July 2022, finding repeated partisan gerrymandering by the Ohio Redistricting Commission.

Following redistricting by the Ohio Redistricting Commission, Steve Demetriou was elected to represent the 35th district in 2022, which included portions of Summit, Portage, and Geauga counties. Based on combined official county results, Demetriou received 29,260 votes (60.3%) to 19,237 votes (39.7%) for Democratic nominee Lori O’Neill, a margin of 10,023 votes, indicating a Republican-leaning district at the time.

Demetriou was re-elected in 2024 from the same district, again composed of parts of Summit, Portage, and Geauga counties. Based on combined official results, he received 36,961 votes (52.6%) to 33,375 votes (47.4%) for Democratic nominee Mark Curtis, a margin of 3,586 votes, reflecting a more competitive district compared to the prior election.

== Campaign finance ==
Campaign finance filings from the Ohio Secretary of State show that Demetriou’s campaign committee, Demetriou For Ohio, received significant support from political action committees (PACs), party committees, and other political organizations across multiple reporting periods, from 2023 through early 2026.

Filings indicate approximately $474,146.26 in contributions from PACs during this period. Major contributing PACs included the Ohio Republican State Central & Executive Committee State Candidate Fund ($115,554), Affiliated Construction Trades Ohio Foundation PCE ($31,000), Political Education Patterns ($23,500), Matt Huffman for Ohio ($17,276.59), the Ohio Servant Leadership Fund ($16,615.67), Ohio Realtors Political Action Committee ($16,000), Friends of Bill Reineke ($12,500), Kohrman Jackson & Krantz PLL PAC ($12,500), Sheet Metal Workers’ COPE 33 ($12,500), and the Ohio Wine and Beer Political Action Committee ($12,000).

Filings also show approximately $92,334.51 in itemized individual contributions, all from Demetriou himself or members of the Demetriou family in the available filings.

Filings further show that Demetriou’s campaign committee made substantial contributions to other Republican candidates and political organizations, including approximately $145,200 to the Ohio House Republican Alliance and $85,000 to the Ohio House Republican Organizational Committee. Additional contributions included approximately $2,500 to Republican candidate Bill Roemer and approximately $1,000 to Republican candidate Kristina Roegner.

== Policy positions ==
=== Education policy ===
In a November 2022 interview following his election to the Ohio House, he stated that expanding school choice options in the state was one of his main legislative priorities.

=== Tax and fiscal policy ===
Demetriou has supported Republican tax and budget measures in the Ohio House. In 2023, he voted in favor of a state budget plan that included provisions for property tax relief and the implementation of a flat income tax structure, according to an official House statement and local reporting on budget votes by Portage County–area legislators.

=== Cryptocurrency and technology policy ===
Demetriou is a proponent of cryptocurrency. In 2025, he introduced House Bill 18, which proposed the establishment of a state cryptocurrency reserve, and would allow the state treasurer to invest as much as 10% of the state's general revenue fund, budget stabilization fund, and lottery prizes trust fund into digital assets, such as crypto and NFTs. participated in House consideration of proposals described as establishing baseline

=== Energy and transportation regulation ===
Demetriou voted in support of House Bill 201 during the 135th General Assembly, legislation that prohibits state agencies and local governments from restricting the sale or use of motor vehicles based on energy source and bars state agencies from adopting the California emissions standards for motor vehicles. The bill was considered by the House Energy and Public Utilities Committee before passage.

=== Voting record summaries ===
Nonpartisan summaries of Demetriou’s voting record indicate alignment with Republican caucus positions on taxation, budgeting, and regulatory policy during his first term in office.

=== Debate over state involvement in cryptocurrency markets ===
Demetriou’s advocacy for a state-level cryptocurrency reserve and other crypto legislation provokes concern among some economists, watchdogs, and conservative fiscal-policy voices, who argue that public funds exposed to crypto’s volatility could threaten taxpayer security.

=== Public library funding cuts ===
The 2025 budget proposal (HB 96) backed by Demetriou would cut roughly US$100 million from statewide library funding, a move characterized by library administrators as “a threat to all library programs, materials and services.” Critics also argue the cuts disproportionately affect rural and underfunded communities.

=== Criticism over adult-content age-verification requirement ===
Under an adult-content age verification law passed as part of the 2025 budget (tied to the Innocence Act), users must submit a government issued photo ID or input personal data to verify age before viewing pornography online. Civil-liberties groups and privacy advocates have warned that this creates potential for intrusive data collection, state surveillance, and inadvertent privacy violations such as data leaks.

== Personal life ==
In July 2026, Demetriou attended the wedding of Taylor Swift and Travis Kelce at Madison Square Garden. It was reported that Demetriou's family had adopted a close childhood friend of groom Travis Kelce.
