= Ohio's 19th senatorial district =

American legislative district

Ohio's 19th State Senate district
Senator
Andrew Brenner; R–Delaware
- Demographics: 85.8% White; 3.6% Black; 2.5% Hispanic; 6% Asian; 1.6% Native American; 0.1% Hawaiian/Pacific Islander
- Population (2020) • Voting age • Citizens of voting age: 357,680; 263,585; 249,315

The Ohio's 19th senatorial district is in Central Ohio and is now made up of Delaware, Knox, Holmes and Coshocton Counties. The distrct now contains the 60, 61 and 92 House Districts. The current Ohio Senator is Republican Andrew Brenner, who will be succeeded by Republican member-elect Ryan Rivers in January 2027.

== 2026 Election Results ==
Ryan Rivers (R) 86,920 55.37%

Scott Charland (D) 70,073 44.63%

== Historically ==
Before the 2023 redistricting, the district was based in north-central Ohio and consisted ofDelaware and Knox counties, as well as a portion of Franklin county. It encompassed Ohio House districts 22, 67 and 68. It has a Cook PVI of R+14.

== List of senators ==
Senator	Party	Term	Notes
James K. Leedy	Republican	January 3, 1967 – December 31, 1971	Resigned prior to the expiration of his term.
Kenneth F. Berry	Republican	January 12, 1972 – December 31, 1972	Berry lost the party nomination in 1972 to Tom Van Meter.
Tom Van Meter	Republican	January 3, 1973 – December 31, 1982	Van Meter opted to not seek re-election in 1982 and instead ran for Ohio Governor.
Lowell Steinbrenner	Republican	January 3, 1983 – July 7, 1985	Steinbrenner resigned prior to the expiration of his term in 1986.
Dick Schafrath	Republican	July 7, 1985 – August 15, 2000	Schafrath resigned to take a position within the Ohio Department of Health.
Bill Harris	Republican	August 15, 2000 – December 31, 2010	Harris served as Senate President from 2005 to 2010 and was term-limited in 2010.
Kris Jordan	Republican	January 3, 2011 – December 31, 2018	Jordan was term-limited in 2018 and won election to the Ohio House of Representatives.
Andrew Brenner	Republican	January 3, 2019 – present	Incumbent
Ryan Rivers	Republican	Assuming office January 4, 2027	Elect
