= Ohio's 27th senatorial district =

American legislative district

Ohio's 27th State Senate district
Senator
Kristina Roegner; R–Hudson
- Demographics: 83.7% White; 7.7% Black; 2.1% Hispanic; 3.9% Asian; 1.9% Native American; 0.1% Hawaiian/Pacific Islander
- Population (2020) • Voting age • Citizens of voting age: 370,233; 297,992; 285,640

Ohio's 27th senatorial district is still based in metro Akron, outside of the city. The district now consists of Portage County, as well as a portion Summit county to the west of the city of Akron. It encompasses Ohio House districts 31, 35, and 72.

The current Ohio Senator is Republican Kristina Roegner and will be succeeded by Democratic member-elect Mike Roberto in January 2027.

== 2026 Election Results ==
Mike Roberto (D) 86,591 53.5%

Steve Demetriou (R) 75,132 46.5%

== Historically ==
Before the 2023 redistricting, Ohio's 27th senatorial district has been based in metro Akron, where it consisted of Portage County, as well as portions of both Summit and Geauga counties. It encompassed Ohio House districts 31, 35 and 72. It has a Cook PVI of +4. The district was represented by the Senate President from 1978 to 1979 with Senator Oliver Ocasek.

== List of sentators ==
Senator	Party	Term	Notes
Oliver Ocasek	Democrat	January 3, 1959 – December 31, 1986	Ocasek was Senate President and did not seek re-election in 1986 but instead ran for the United States Congress.
Roy Ray	Republican	January 2, 1987 – January 16, 2001	Ray resigned in 2001 to work at Cleveland State University.
Kevin Coughlin	Republican	February 6, 2001 – December 31, 2010	Coughlin was term-limited in 2010.
Frank LaRose	Republican	January 3, 2011 – December 31, 2018	LaRose was term-limited in 2018 and won election as Ohio Secretary of State.
Kristina Roegner	Republican	January 3, 2019 – present	Incumbent
