= Bill DeMora =

American politician

Member of the Ohio Senate from the 25th district
- Incumbent
- Assumed office January 1, 2023
- Preceded by: Kenny Yuko

Personal details
- Born: William DeMora
- Party: Democratic
- Education: Ohio State University

William P. "Bill" DeMora is an American politician who is a member of the Ohio Senate for the 25th district.

== Education ==
DeMora graduated from Euclid High School and Ohio State University.

== Career ==
DeMora began his career as a youth and campus coordinator for the Bill Clinton 1996 presidential campaign. He later worked as president of the Ohio Young Democrats, executive director of the Ohio Democratic Party, and executive director of the Ohio League of Conservation Voters. In 2008, he established an independent political consulting firm. He was elected to the Ohio Senate in November 2022 and assumed office on January 1, 2023.
