= Michele Reynolds =

American politician

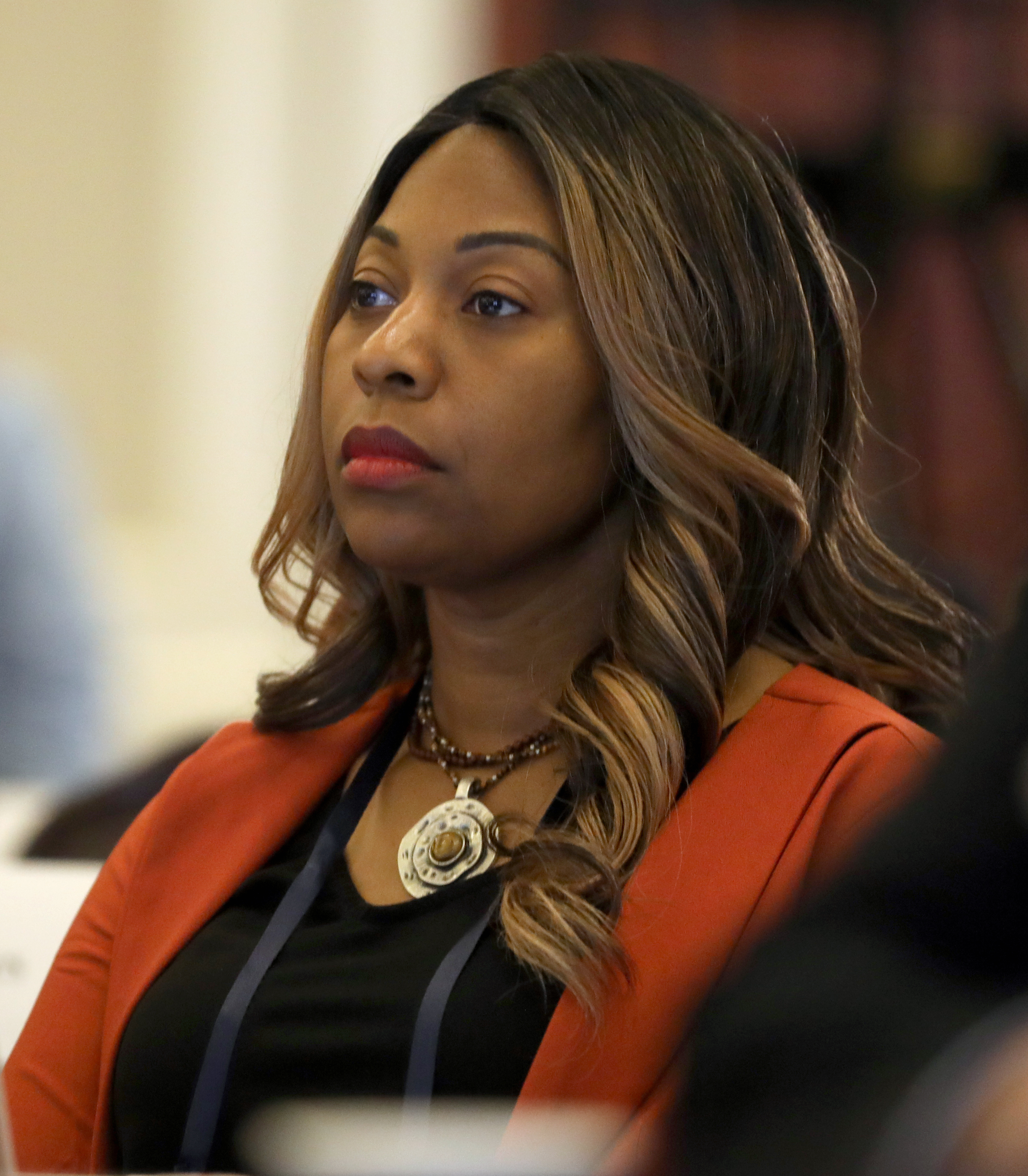
- Reynolds in 2023

Member of the Ohio Senate from the 3rd district
- Incumbent
- Assumed office January 3, 2023
- Preceded by: Tina Maharath

Personal details
- Party: Democratic (formerly); Republican
- Children: 1
- Education: Hondros College; University of Cincinnati (BS); University of Akron (MPA); Thomas Jefferson School of Law (MJur); Northcentral University (PhD)
- Occupation: Politician

Michele Reynolds is an American politician. A Republican, she is a member of the Ohio Senate.

== Experience ==
In 2019, Reynolds was elected Township Trustee for Madison Township in Franklin County.

In 2022, Reynolds was criticized for referencing an antisemitic phrase in a 2014 book. Several leaders of The Ohio Jewish Communities commented that her remarks were taken out of context and acknowledged their support for her leadership.

Reynolds won election to the Ohio Senate in 2022, defeating incumbent Democrat Tina Maharath. She was the first African-American woman elected as a Republican in Franklin County.

In 2026, Reynolds came under criticism for her connections to the Nothing Into Something Real Estate (NISRE)'s EXIT program, a faith-based temporary housing organization that served formerly incarcerated individuals. One such individual, Brian Golsby, was under NISRE's purview when he murdered Reagan Tokes, an Ohio State University student.

== Electoral history ==
Ohio Senate 3rd District
Year	Democrat	Votes	Pct	Republican	Votes	Pct
2022	Tina Maharath	56,023	47.58%	Michele Reynolds	61,723	52.42%
