= Thomas West (American politician) =

US politician

Thomas E. West
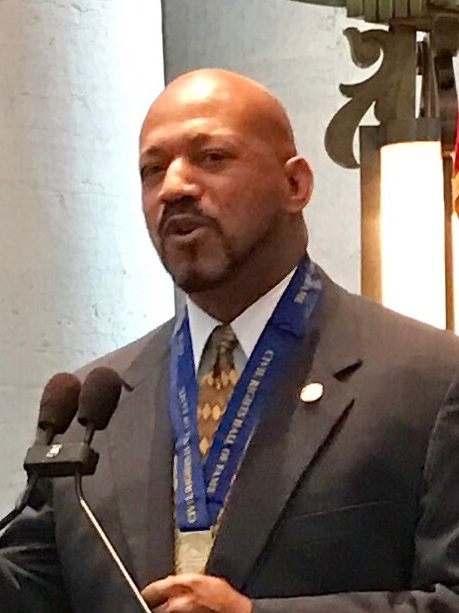

Member of the Ohio House of Representatives from the 49th District
- In office January 3, 2017 – January 3, 2023
- Preceded by: Stephen Slesnick
- Succeeded by: Jim Thomas

Personal details
- Born: October 12, 1964 (age 61) Beaver Falls, Pennsylvania
- Party: Democratic
- Spouse: Lisa West
- Education: Mount Union College; University of Akron

Thomas E. West (born October 12, 1964) is an American businessman and politician who served as the state representative for the 49th District of the Ohio House of Representatives from 2017 to 2023. The district consisted of a portion of Stark County, including Canton and most of Massillon. He is a member of the Democratic Party.

After leaving elected office, West became president and CEO of the Greater Stark County Urban League.

== Life and career ==
A licensed social worker, West also owned and operated several small businesses before entering politics. He holds a bachelor's degree from the Mount Union College, and received his Masters in Social Work from the University of Akron.

West served on the Canton City Council for 13 years, acting as the chairman of the Annexation Committee and a member of the Capital Improvement Committee, Special Improvement District and Canton Community Improvement Corporation. He is married with two children.

== Ohio House of Representatives ==
=== Campaigns ===
In 2016, state Representative Stephen Slesnick was term-limited after serving in the House since 2008. West was one of two Democrats to declare interest in the seat, along with Joyce-Healy Abrams, the daughter of William J. Healy, who represented the seat for twenty-five years, and granddaughter of William J. Healy II, who had also represented the seat and was the former Mayor of Canton. Healy-Abrams herself had run for Congress against Bob Gibbs in 2012, losing a close race. Despite her name recognition, West ended up winning by 110 votes.

West defeated Republican Dan McMasters 57% to 43% in the general election. He was sworn in on January 3, 2017.

West increased his margin of victory in his 2018 reelection, defeating Republican candidate James Haavisto 58% to 42%. West defeated Haavisto again in a rematch in 2020.

In reapportionment following the 2020 Census, West's district was redrawn with lines more favorable to Republicans. In the 2022 election, West lost his re-election bid to Republican candidate Jim Thomas.

=== Committees and Caucuses ===
West served on the following committees: Health, Criminal Justice, Finance, Aging and Long Term Care, Finance Subcommittee on Health and Human Services, and the Joint Medicaid Oversight Committee. In November 2020, West was elected President of the Ohio Legislative Black Caucus. In addition to his legislative committees and caucuses, West also received gubernatorial appointments to the Ohio Commission on Fatherhood, Ohio Advisory on Aging, and the Governor's Executive Workforce Board.

== Election history ==
Ohio House 49th District
Year	Democrat	Votes	Pct	Republican	Votes	Pct
2016	Thomas West	24,064	56.52%	Dan McMasters	18,513	43.48%
2018	Thomas West	18,834	57.61%	James Haavisto	13,859	42.39%
2020	Thomas West	22,575	55.69%	James Haavisto	17,959	44.31%
2022	Thomas West	16,307	46.4%	Jim Thomas	18,806	53.6%

Political offices
Preceded by Stephen Slesnick	Ohio House of Representatives, 49th District; 2017–present	Incumbent
