= Ohio's 25th senatorial district =

American legislative district

Ohio's 25th State Senate district
Senator
Bill DeMora; D–Columbus
- Demographics: 61.7% White; 20.7% Black; 8.6% Hispanic; 7.6% Asian; 1.9% Native American; 0.1% Hawaiian/Pacific Islander
- Population (2020) • Voting age • Citizens of voting age: 353,719; 277,168; 244,109

After the 2023 redistricting, Ohio's 25th senatorial district was moved back to the Cleveland area and is now the southern half of Cuyahoga County, which is west of the Cleveland Metropolitan area. It is made up of the House Districts numbered 14, 15. 17.

The district is currently represented in the Ohio Senate by Democrat Bill DeMora, who was reelected for another term in November 2026.

== 2026 Election Results ==
Dell De Mora (D) 89,599 72.4%

Don Roberts (R) 3,416 27.6%

== Historically ==
Before the 2023 Redistricting, Ohio's 25th Senate District was based in the Cleveland metro area until redistricting following the 2020 census saw it transferred to Franklin County. It encompassed Ohio House districts 3, 7, and 9. Within its boundaries are the cities of Upper Arlington and Grandview Heights, the village of Marble Cliff, and portions of the city of Columbus, including the Ohio State University campus. It had a Cook PVI of D+15.

== List of senators ==
Senator	Party	Term	Notes
John Weeks	Republican	January 3, 1967 – December 31, 1970	Weeks was replaced on the 1970 General Election ballot by Paul Matia.
Paul Matia	Republican	January 5, 1971 – December 31, 1974	Matia lost re-election in 1974 to Tony Celebrezze.
Tony Celebrezze	Democrat	January 3, 1975 – December 31, 1978	Celebrezze did not seek re-election in 1978 and instead ran for Ohio Secretary of State.
Paul Matia	Republican	January 1, 1979 – December 31, 1982	Matia did not seek re-election in 1982.
Lee Fisher	Democrat	January 3, 1983 – December 31, 1990	Fisher did not seek re-election in 1990 and instead ran for Ohio Attorney General.
Eric Fingerhut	Democrat	January 3, 1991 – December 17, 1992	Fingerhut won election in 1992 to the United States Congress.
Judy Sheerer	Democrat	December 17, 1992 – December 31, 1998	Sheerer did not seek re-election in 1998.
Eric Fingerhut	Democrat	January 5, 1999 – December 31, 2006	Fingerhut was term-limited in 2006.
Lance Mason	Democrat	January 2, 2007 – September 16, 2008	Mason resigned in 2008 to take a seat on the Cuyahoga County Court of Common Pleas.
Nina Turner	Democrat	September 16, 2008 – December 31, 2014	Turner did not seek re-election in 2014 and instead ran for Ohio Secretary of State.
Kenny Yuko	Democrat	January 6, 2015 – January 1, 2023	Yuko was term-limited in 2022.
Bill DeMora	Democrat	January 1, 2023 – present	Incumbent
