= Andrew Brenner =

American politician (born 1971)

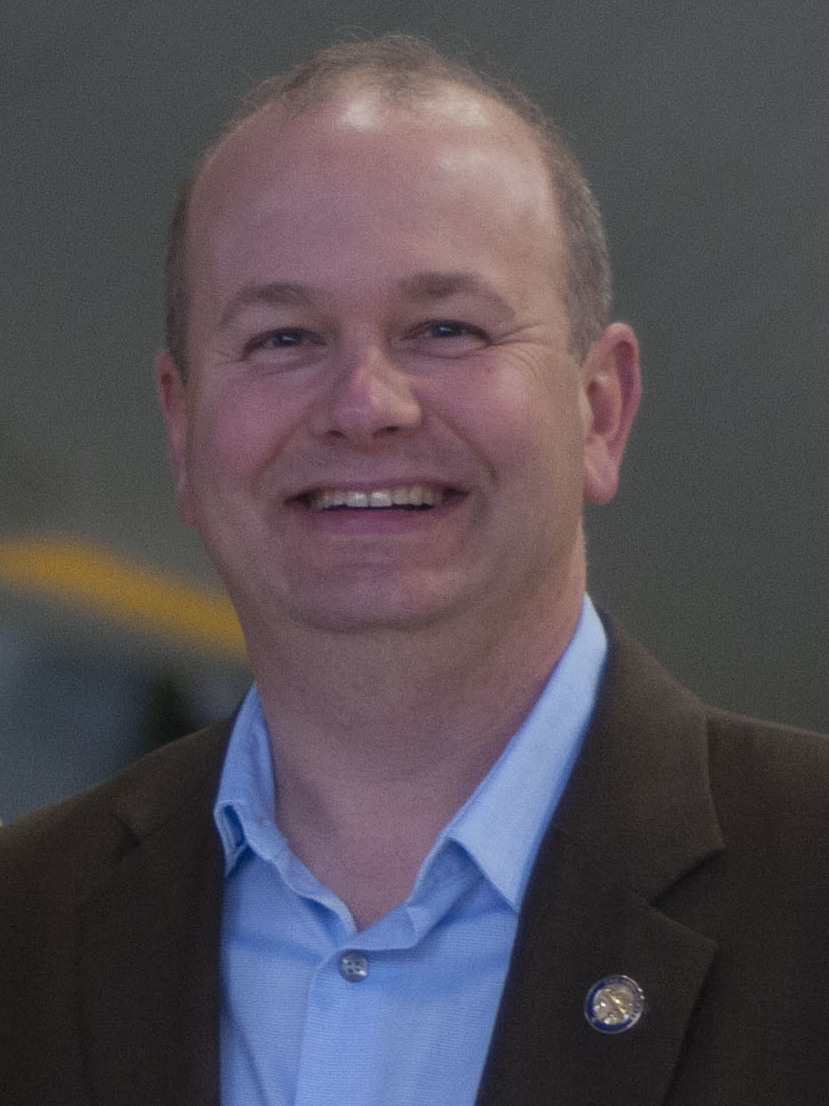
- Brenner in 2019

Member of the Ohio Senate from the 19th district
- Incumbent
- Assumed office January 6, 2019
- Preceded by: Kris Jordan

Member of the Ohio House of Representatives from the 67th district
- In office January 3, 2011 – December 31, 2018
- Preceded by: Kris Jordan
- Succeeded by: Kris Jordan

Personal details
- Born: January 14, 1971 (age 55) Columbus, Ohio
- Party: Republican
- Spouse: Sara Marie
- Education: Ohio State University (BS)
- Profession: Politician
- Website: Campaign website

Andrew O. Brenner (born January 14, 1971) is an American politician who has been a Republican member of the Ohio Senate representing the 19th district since 2019. He previously served in the Ohio House of Representatives from 2011 to 2018.

== Campaign contributions and legislative activity ==
=== 2017-2020 HB6 era ===
Campaign finance filings from the Ohio Secretary of State show that Andrew Brenner's campaign committee received contributions from multiple corporate and industry political action committees, including entities in the energy and utilities sectors. Documented contributions included $4,500 from FirstEnergy PAC, $3,350 from NiSource Inc. PAC, $500 from Duke Energy PAC, $500 from Enbridge PAC, $1,200 from rural electrification committees, and $250 from IGS Ventures between 2017 and 2019.

In 2019, Brenner voted in favor of the conference committee report for House Bill 166, the state operating budget bill through which provisions of House Bill 6 were enacted into law.

In the 134th General Assembly, Brenner was listed as a cosponsor of Senate Bill 117, legislation proposing repeal of certain House Bill 6 provisions and providing for customer refunds.

House Bill 6 later became central to the Ohio nuclear bribery scandal investigation.

=== 2020–2026 Campaign finance ===
Campaign finance filings from the Ohio Secretary of State show that committees associated with Andrew Brenner reported contributions and expenditures across multiple election cycles from 2020 through 2026.

Itemized filings show that Brenner's campaign committees received contributions from political action committees (PACs) associated with energy and utilities companies, education-related organizations, insurance and financial services, and business and professional associations active in Ohio state policy.

These sectors correspond to policy areas addressed by committees on which Brenner has served, including primary and secondary education, energy and public utilities, finance, and insurance.

=== Committee assignments ===
According to Ballotpedia, Andrew Brenner has served on multiple Ohio Senate committees across legislative sessions, including leadership roles as chair.

2023–2024

- Primary and Secondary Education Committee, Chair
- Energy and Public Utilities Committee
- Finance Committee
- Rules and Reference Committee
- Transportation Committee

2021–2022

- Energy and Public Utilities Committee
- Finance Committee
- Insurance Committee
- Primary and Secondary Education Committee, Chair
- Rules and Reference Committee

2019–2020

- Joint Committee on Agency Rule Review
- Joint Education Oversight Committee
- Education Committee
- Insurance and Financial Institutions Committee
- Local Government, Public Safety, and Veterans Affairs Committee, Vice Chair
- Energy and Public Utilities Committee

2017 legislative session

- Community and Family Advancement Committee
- Education and Career Readiness Committee, Chair
- Financial Institutions, Housing and Urban Development Committee
- Insurance Committee
- Rules and Reference Committee
- Joint Education Oversight Committee

== Legislative activity ==
In the Ohio Senate, Brenner has focused on education policy and election law. As a member of the Senate Education Committee, he has introduced and supported legislation affecting public school governance and accountability.

In 2025, Brenner introduced legislation that would allow the state to close underperforming public schools, a proposal that drew criticism from some educators and policymakers. He has also supported proposals to restrict diversity and inclusion initiatives in public schools and to change Ohio's school funding system, including reducing reliance on local property tax levies and expanding school choice programs.

Brenner has also been involved in election-related legislation, including proposals addressing absentee ballot deadlines and election procedures.

== Senate Bill 23 (Heartbeat Bill) ==
Brenner was a co-sponsor of Senate Bill 23, also known as the "Heartbeat Bill", which was signed into law by Governor Mike DeWine in April 2019. The law prohibited most abortions once fetal cardiac activity could be detected.

== Public statements and incidents ==
Brenner has drawn attention for statements comparing actions of the state government to those of Nazi Germany.

On April 22, 2020, immediately following Holocaust Remembrance Day, Brenner and his wife made public posts on Facebook comparing Ohio Department of Health policies during the COVID-19 pandemic under then-director Amy Acton to Nazi Germany. Ohio governor and fellow Republican Mike DeWine condemned the comments.

On May 3, 2021, Brenner participated in a public legislative Zoom meeting while driving. He used a virtual background during the meeting, though his seatbelt was visible. Brenner stated that he was not distracted.

== Personal life ==
Brenner was born in Columbus, Ohio and graduated from Ohio State University in 1993 with a Bachelor of Science in business administration. He is married to Sara Marie Brenner, and lives in Delaware.

== Early life and career ==
Brenner was born in Columbus, Ohio. He earned a Bachelor of Science in business administration from Ohio State University in 1993 and worked for 11 years in the real estate and mortgage fields.

He served as Delaware County Recorder from 2005 to 2010. Prior to that role, he served on the Kingston Township zoning board and as a representative to the Delaware County Regional Planning Commission.

In 2010, former representative Kris Jordan moved to the Ohio Senate, and Brenner ran for the open seat. In the Republican primary, he faced five opponents and received 24.4% of the vote. He defeated Richard Bird in the general election by approximately 26,000 votes.

Over four terms in the Ohio House of Representatives, Brenner sponsored multiple pieces of legislation, including House Bills 58, 102, 124, and 217 of the 132nd General Assembly. He also served as chairman of the Ohio House Education and Career Readiness Committee, which considers policy related to K–12 education in Ohio.

In November 2018, Brenner was elected to Ohio's 19th senatorial district, representing Delaware, Knox, and parts of Franklin counties.

In 2026, Brenner was term-limited from seeking another term in the Ohio Senate and attempted to flip-flop chambers and go back to the Ohio House of Representatives by running in the 61st district. He faced former state representative Shawn Stevens in the Republican primary. Brenner's bid to switch chambers ended in a decisive defeat, with Stevens receiving 57.1% of the vote to Brenner's 42.9%.
