= Kristina Roegner =

American politician (born 1968)

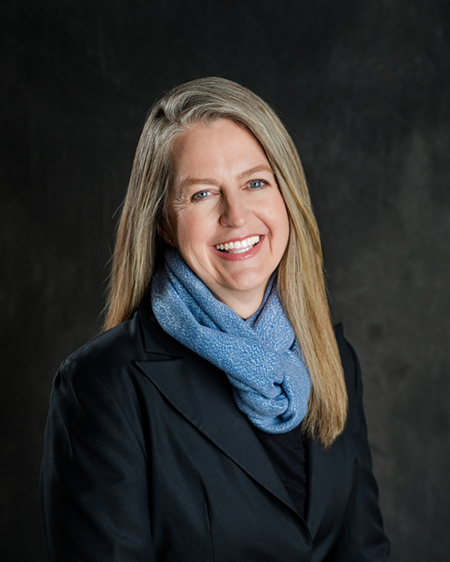
- Official portrait, 2019

Member of the Ohio Senate from the 27th district
- Incumbent
- Assumed office January 1, 2019
- Preceded by: Frank LaRose

Member of the Ohio House of Representatives from the 37th district
- In office January 2011 – December 2018
- Preceded by: Mike Moran
- Succeeded by: Casey Weinstein

Personal details
- Born: November 27, 1968 (age 57) Akron, Ohio, U.S.
- Party: Republican
- Spouse: Eric
- Children: 3
- Education: Tufts University (BS); University of Pennsylvania (MBA)

Kristina Daley Roegner (born November 27, 1968) is an American politician who has served as a member of the Ohio Senate since 2019, representing the 27th senatorial district. In February 2025, the Associated Press reported that Roegner announced a campaign for Ohio Treasurer of State in the 2026 election.

== Ohio Senate ==
Roegner is serving her second term in the Ohio Senate representing the 27th senatorial district, which includes the majority of Ohioans living in Summit County.

The 27th senatorial district was redistricted to exist solely in Summit County for the 2022 election cycle. Senator Roegner won re-election to a second term on November 8, 2022, defeating challenger Patricia Goetz 51.1% to 48.9%.

== Campaign contributions ==
=== 2017–2020 HB6 era campaign finance activity ===
Campaign finance filings from the Ohio Secretary of State show that the campaign committee of Kristina Roegner received contributions from political action committees, including the FirstEnergy political action committee (FirstEnergy PAC FSL), between 2017 and 2019. Documented contributions from FirstEnergy PAC during this period included $2,500 on January 29, 2018, $10,207.79 on May 2, 2018, $7,500 on October 14, 2018, $5,000 on October 13, 2018, and $500 on April 16, 2019.

Additional contributions during this period were received from other corporate and industry-affiliated political action committees, including NiSource PAC, BakerHostetler PAC, Kegler Brown Hill & Ritter, Taft Stettinius & Hollister, and Squire Patton Boggs.

=== 2020–2026 campaign finance activity ===
Campaign finance filings from the Ohio Secretary of State show that political committees and party-affiliated organizations played a significant role in expenditures supporting Kristina Roegner during the 2020–2025 election cycles.

Records indicate that approximately $2.15 million in expenditures were made by political committees during this period, with the majority occurring in the 2022 election cycle.

The largest share of this spending was attributed to the Republican Senate Campaign Committee, which accounted for more than $1.8 million in expenditures. Additional spending was reported by the Ohio Republican Party and the Republican State Leadership Committee.

Expenditures were primarily directed toward media-related campaign activity, including television advertising, digital advertising, and media production services.

Filings also show that Roegner and associated committees directed substantial contributions to party-affiliated political action committees during the same period. Records indicate more than $530,000 in contributions to the Republican Senate Campaign Committee between 2020 and 2026.

Available filings for this period show limited direct contributions from regulated-industry political action committees, with smaller contributions including a $1,000 donation from NiSource PAC in 2026.

=== Committee assignments ===
135th General Assembly (2023–2024)

- Government Oversight Committee – Chair
- Senate Health Committee
- Transportation Committee
- Senate Ways and Means Committee – Vice Chair

134th General Assembly (2021–2022)

- Government Oversight and Reform Committee – Chair
- Senate Health Committee
- Transportation Committee
- Senate Ways and Means Committee – Vice Chair

133rd General Assembly (2019–2020)

- Senate Health Committee
- Government Oversight and Reform Committee
- Senate Ways and Means Committee – Vice Chair
- Transportation, Commerce, and Workforce Committee

132nd General Assembly (2017–2018)

- Federalism and Interstate Relations Committee – Chair
- Public Utilities Committee

== House Bill 6 ==
House Bill 6 (HB6), enacted in 2019, established subsidies for certain nuclear power plants and was later described as Ohio’s largest public corruption scandal. Federal investigations found that FirstEnergy funded political activity related to the legislation through a network of contributions and expenditures.

Roegner is not listed among the senators voting on final passage of HB6, according to official roll-call records.

=== Senate Bill 346 and repeal efforts ===
In 2020, during the 133rd General Assembly, Roegner was a cosponsor of Senate Bill 346, legislation that proposed repealing House Bill 6 and restoring Ohio’s prior energy law. The bill did not advance to enactment.

=== Senate Bill 117 and partial repeal of the 2019 energy law ===
In the 134th General Assembly, Roegner cosponsored Senate Bill 117, legislation that partially repealed provisions of the 2019 law enacted under House Bill 6.

Additional subsidy programs tied to the Ohio Valley Electric Corporation (OVEC) coal plants remained in place after the partial repeal and continued to be debated in subsequent years. In 2025, Ohio ended subsidies for two coal plants that had been supported under provisions associated with the House Bill 6 framework.

== Legislation and political positions ==
Roegner has sponsored and supported a range of socially conservative legislation during her time in the Ohio legislature.

=== Primary sponsor of abortion ban “Heartbeat” bill ===
In February 2019, Roegner introduced Senate Bill 23, legislation commonly known as the “heartbeat bill” or the Human Rights and Heartbeat Protection Act. The bill prohibits most abortions once embryonic cardiac activity can be detected, typically around six weeks into pregnancy, and does not include exceptions for rape or incest.

SB 23 passed the Ohio Senate on March 13, 2019, and the Ohio House of Representatives on April 10, 2019. Governor Mike DeWine signed the bill into law on April 11, 2019, and it was scheduled to take effect on July 11, 2019.

On July 3, 2019, a federal district court issued a preliminary injunction blocking enforcement of the law under then-existing federal constitutional precedent.

Following the U.S. Supreme Court’s overruling of Roe v. Wade in June 2022, state officials obtained dissolution of the federal injunction, and SB 23 briefly took effect on June 24, 2022. Enforcement was again halted on September 14, 2022, when a Hamilton County judge issued a temporary restraining order under the Ohio Constitution.

In October 2024, the Hamilton County Court of Common Pleas entered a permanent injunction against SB 23, holding that Ohio’s six-week abortion ban violated the reproductive-rights amendment approved by voters in 2023.

In August 2023, after the period in which SB 23 had briefly been enforceable, Roegner wrote an op-ed stating that Ohio’s abortion laws should be paired with stronger support systems for women and children. In follow-up reporting, she and her family told the Akron Beacon Journal they were in the process of completing the training and home-study requirements to become licensed foster parents in Ohio.

=== Higher education and DEI legislation ===
In 2025, Roegner supported Senate Bill 1 (SB 1) of the 136th General Assembly, a comprehensive higher-education overhaul bill affecting Ohio’s public colleges and universities. The legislation bans diversity, equity, and inclusion (DEI) offices, programs, and mandatory training, restricts faculty strikes, and requires instructional neutrality on certain topics.

The bill drew widespread opposition from higher-education institutions, faculty organizations, students, and civil-rights groups. According to reporting by the Ohio Capital Journal, more than 800 individuals submitted opponent testimony during committee hearings on the legislation.

Despite protests, the Ohio Senate advanced and approved the bill in February 2025. Roegner publicly supported the legislation and participated in a press conference promoting the bill as a higher-education reform measure.

Civil-rights organizations, including the ACLU of Ohio, criticized SB 1, arguing that it would undermine academic freedom and weaken support systems for students at public universities.

The Ohio House of Representatives passed SB 1 in March 2025, and Governor Mike DeWine signed the bill into law later that month. The law took effect in June 2025.

Following enactment, opponents organized a statewide referendum effort to repeal the law, beginning signature collection in May 2025. As the law’s effective date approached, reporting described the repeal campaign as facing logistical and timing challenges.

After the law took effect, Ohio public colleges and universities began implementing changes to comply with the new requirements, including eliminating or restructuring DEI programs and updating institutional policies. State officials and institutions clarified that the statute applies only to public institutions and does not block state aid to private or independent colleges.

=== Bathroom and facility access legislation ===
In 2024, Roegner voted in favor of Senate Bill 104, the “Protect All Students Act,” which requires public schools and universities to assign restroom and locker room access based on sex assigned at birth. Governor Mike DeWine signed the bill into law in November 2024.

=== Selling state lands ===
Roegner has also been an advocate for selling state lands for oil and natural gas drilling, including on Lake Erie. She had urged rejection of the amendment, which would have added an extra layer of protection for Lake Erie on top of an existing federal ban on drilling, stating that it is foolish to let only Canada reap the benefits of the reserves underneath the lake.

=== Education funding ===
Roegner has been critical of education funding policies under Governor John Kasich, describing aspects of the state’s school funding approach as "wealth redistribution".

=== COVID-19 pandemic ===
In May 2020, during the COVID-19 pandemic, Roegner and Senator Rob McColley introduced a bill that would immediately end Ohio's stay-at-home order and limit the state health director's authority to issue similar orders. The proposal drew criticism from public health experts, and Governor Mike DeWine said he would veto legislation that restricted the health director's authority during the crisis.

=== Gender Politics ===
In 2023, Roegner voted for legislation to ban gender-affirming care—including the usage of puberty blockers, hormone replacement therapy, and gender transition surgery—for transgender youth and to ban transgender athletes from competing in women's and girls' sports. Roegner argued, "attempting to change someone's sex is a fool's errand." The legislation was vetoed by Ohio Governor Mike DeWine, but his veto was overridden by the Ohio General Assembly. Roegner said she was "disappointed that the Governor chose not to protect girls across the State of Ohio." During a Senate debate on the veto, Roegner falsely stated that gender-affirming care does not exist: "Despite what the liberals say, gender is not assigned at birth, but rather from the moment of conception, you are either male or you are female. There is no such thing as gender-affirming care. You can't affirm something that doesn't exist."

=== Recreational Marijuana ===
In 2025, Roegner supported legislation to amend the state's recreational marijuana law, which had been adopted by voters in a ballot initiative in 2023. The bill would decrease the THC content allowed in products and limit home growing of cannabis.

In February 2023, Roegner supported Senate Bill 1 (135th GA), legislation that proposed banning diversity, equity, and inclusion (DEI) programs at Ohio’s public colleges and universities. The bill also sought to limit faculty strikes and require instructional neutrality on topics like climate change and abortion rights, drawing criticism from organizations such as the American Association of University Professors and the ACLU of Ohio.

=== Immigration ===
In May 2025, Roegner introduced Senate Bill 172 in the 136th General Assembly, which would require Ohio judges and court personnel to permit immigration-related arrests by federal agents on courthouse grounds under specified conditions. The proposal drew criticism from immigrant-rights advocates and legal groups who argued it could deter participation in the justice system.

=== Limited Collective Bargaining ===
In 2011, Roegner supported a bill to limit collective bargaining for public employees, stating that it is something taxpayers should celebrate.

== Redistricting and gerrymandering ==
During Kristina Roegner’s tenure in the Ohio General Assembly, both her Ohio House and Ohio Senate districts were drawn as part of statewide legislative maps that advocates and courts have described as partisan gerrymanders favoring Republicans. In 2021, the Republican-controlled Ohio Redistricting Commission approved new state House and Senate maps that voting-rights groups said gave an “extreme and unfair advantage to the Republican Party” and locked in veto-proof Republican supermajorities in both chambers.

On January 12, 2022, the Supreme Court of Ohio struck down those legislative maps as unconstitutional partisan gerrymanders, holding that the General Assembly maps violated the anti-gerrymandering provisions added to the Ohio Constitution in 2015. Despite repeated rulings that the maps were unconstitutional, a federal three-judge court ultimately imposed one of the invalidated Republican maps for use in the 2022 elections because of impending deadlines, and Roegner’s 2022 re-election race for the 27th Senate district was conducted under that map.

Nonpartisan analyses have continued to describe Ohio as one of the most heavily gerrymandered states in the country, with most Ohioans living in legislative districts that are uncontested or effectively noncompetitive under the current maps.

== Career ==
Roegner graduated cum laude from Tufts University in 1990 with a degree in Mechanical Engineering. Soon after, she worked for Westinghouse Power Generation overhauling power turbines, from 1990 to 1993. She earned an MBA in Finance from the University of Pennsylvania Wharton School of Business in 1995. She then served as a consultant for the US-based firm McKinsey & Company.

Roegner entered public office in 2004, when she was seated on the Hudson City Council. Roegner would serve in this position until 2010.

== Ohio House of Representatives ==
When Mike Moran won the 42nd district in 2008, he took a seat in what was traditionally a Republican district. Therefore, he was a top target for House Republicans in 2010, and Roegner was fielded to try to unseat him. In the end, she went on to beat Moran 51% to 49%.

For the 129th General Assembly, Speaker of the House William G. Batchelder named Roegner as a member of the Republican majority caucus' Policy Committee. She was sworn into office on January 3, 2011.

Roegner won reelection to the seat in 2012 with 54.18% of the vote over Democrat Tom Schmida, and again in 2014 with 58% of the vote.

=== Committee assignments ===
- Committee on Public Utilities (Vice Chair)
- Committee on Commerce and Labor

== Electoral history ==
Ohio Senate 27th district: results 2018-2022
Year	Democrat	Votes	Pct	Republican	Votes	Pct
2018	Adam VanHo	59,711	41.5%	Kristina Roegner	84,031	58.5%
2022	Patricia Goetz	70,609	48.9%	Kristina Roegner	73,801	51.1%

Ohio House 37th district: results 2010–2016
Year	Democrat	Votes	Pct	Republican	Votes	Pct
2010	Mike Moran	19,825	49%	Kristina Roegner	21,240	51%
2012	Tom Schmida	27,460	46%	Kristina Roegner	31,378	54%
2014	David Worhatch	14,015	42%	Kristina Roegner	19,816	58%
2016	Casey Weinstein	26,675	43%	Kristina Roegner	35,503	57%
