= Ohio Senate =

Upper house of the Ohio General Assembly

- 136th Ohio General Assembly
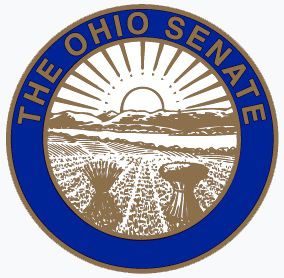

Type
- Type: Upper house
- Term limits: 2 terms (8 years)

History
- New session started: January 6, 2025

Leadership
- President: Rob McColley (R) since January 6, 2025
- President pro tempore: Bill Reineke (R) since January 6, 2025
- Majority Leader: Theresa Gavarone (R) since January 6, 2025
- Minority Leader: Nickie Antonio (D) since January 3, 2023

Structure
- Seats: 33
- Political groups: Majority: Republican (24); Minority: Democratic (9)
- Length of term: 4 years
- Authority: Article II, Ohio Constitution
- Salary: $68,674/year

Elections
- Last election: November 3, 2026 (17 seats)
- Next election: November 7, 2028 (16 seats)

Meeting place
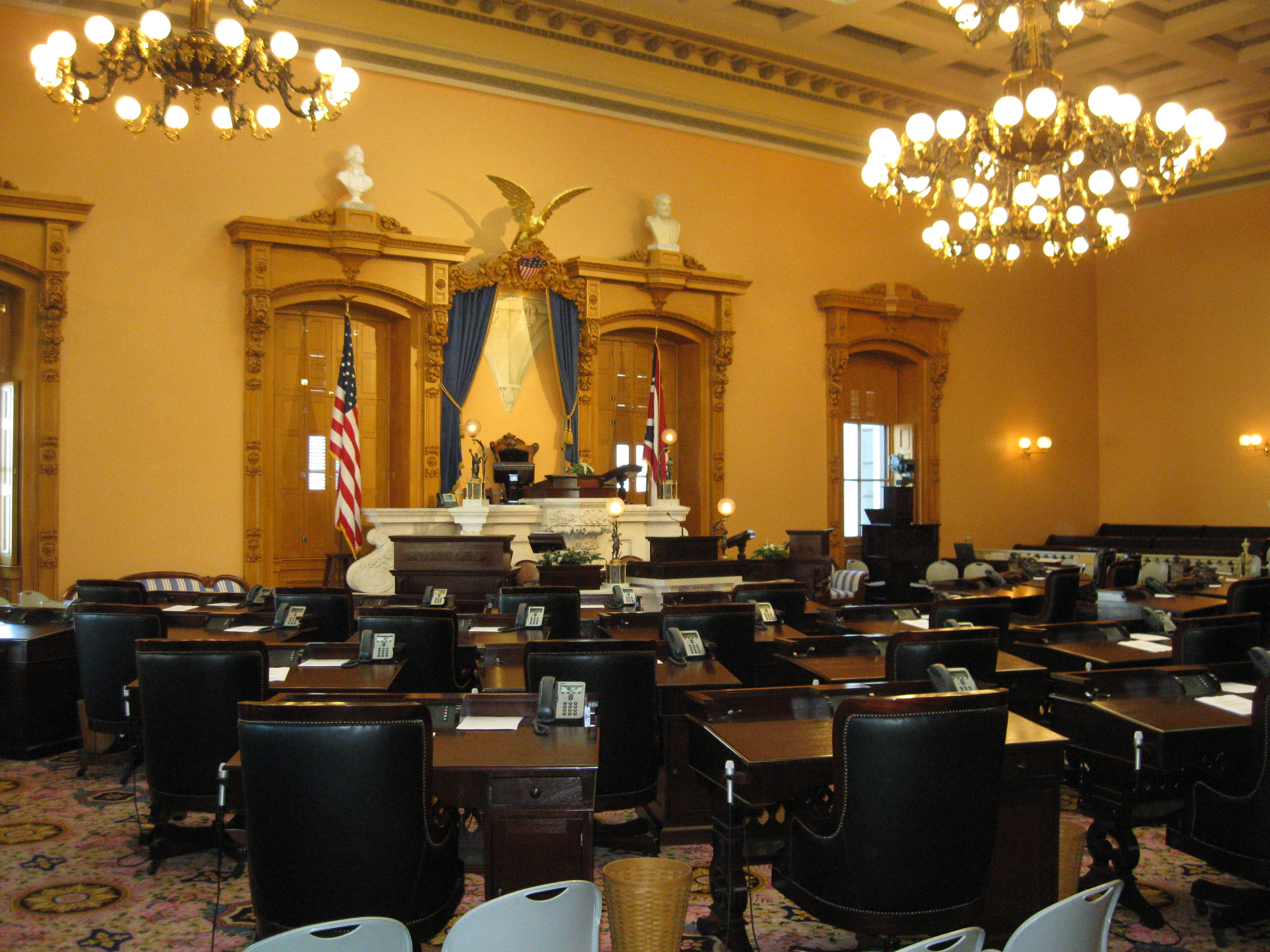
- Senate Chamber; Ohio Statehouse; Columbus, Ohio

Website
- ohiosenate.gov

The Ohio Senate is the upper house of the Ohio General Assembly, the lower house being the Ohio House of Representatives. The State Senate, which meets in the Ohio Statehouse in Columbus, first convened in 1803. Senators are elected for four year terms, staggered every two years such that half of the seats are contested at each election. Even numbered seats and odd numbered seats are contested in separate election years. The president of the Ohio Senate presides over the body when in session, and is currently Rob McColley.

Currently, the Senate consists of 24 Republicans and 9 Democrats, with the Republicans controlling two more seats than the 22 required for a supermajority vote. Senators are limited to two consecutive terms. Each senator represents approximately 349,000 Ohioans, and each Senate district encompasses three corresponding Ohio House of Representatives districts.

== Composition ==
135th General Assembly (2022-2023)

	Party (Shading indicates majority caucus)		Total	Vacant
	Democratic	Republican	Total	Vacant
End of previous Assembly	7	26	33	0
Begin 2025 Session	9	24	33	0
Latest voting share	27%	73%		

=== Leadership ===
Seal of the President

Presiding
President of the Senate	Rob McColley
President Pro Tempore	Bill Reineke
Majority Leadership
Majority Floor Leader	Theresa Gavarone
Majority Whip	George Lang
Minority Leadership
Minority Leader	Nickie Antonio
Assistant Minority Leader	Hearcel Craig
Minority Whip	Kent Smith
Assistant Minority Whip	Beth Liston

Other officers

Clerk: According to the Rules of the Senate, the clerk is elected by the members of the Senate and is tasked with maintaining records of all Senate bills and resolutions. The clerk is also responsible for handling all documents received from other government departments.

=== Members of the 136th Senate ===
Senate districts by party: Democratic Republican

District	Name	Party	Residence	Counties	Term Limited	Start
1	Rob McColley	Republican	Napoleon	Defiance, Fulton, Hancock, Hardin, Henry, Logan, Paulding, Putnam, Van Wert, Williams	2026	2017 (Note: Originally appointed.)
2	Theresa Gavarone	Republican	Bowling Green	Erie, Huron, Lucas, Ottawa, Wood	2028	2019
3	Michele Reynolds	Republican	Canal Winchester	Franklin, Madison, Pickaway	2030	2022
4	George Lang	Republican	West Chester	Butler	2028	2020
5	Steve Huffman	Republican	Tipp City	Butler, Darke, Miami, Montgomery, Preble	2026	2018
6	Willis Blackshear Jr.	Democratic	Dayton	Montgomery	2032	2024
7	Steve Wilson	Republican	Maineville	Hamilton, Warren	2026	2017
8	Louis Blessing	Republican	Colerain Township	Hamilton	2028	2019
9	Catherine Ingram	Democratic	Cincinnati	Hamilton	2030	2022
10	Kyle Koehler	Republican	Springfield	Clark, Clinton, Greene	2032	2024
11	Paula Hicks-Hudson	Democratic	Toledo	Lucas	2030	2022
12	Susan Manchester	Republican	Waynesfield	Allen, Auglaize, Champaign, Darke, Logan, Mercer, Shelby	2032	2024
13	Vacant (Note: Nathan Manning resigned after being appointed to a judicial position.)	Republican		Huron, Lorain		
14	Terry Johnson	Republican	McDermott	Adams, Brown, Clermont, Scioto	2028	2019
15	Hearcel Craig	Democratic	Columbus	Franklin	2026	2018
16	Beth Liston	Democratic	Dublin	Franklin	2032	2024
17	Shane Wilkin	Republican	Jasper Township	Fayette, Gallia, Highland, Hocking, Jackson, Lawrence, Perry, Pike, Ross, Vinton	2030	2022
18	Jerry Cirino	Republican	Kirtland	Cuyahoga, Lake	2028	2020
19	Andrew Brenner	Republican	Powell	Coshocton, Delaware, Holmes, Knox	2026	2018
20	Tim Schaffer	Republican	Lancaster	Fairfield, Licking, Perry	2028	2019
21	Kent Smith	Democratic	Cleveland	Cuyahoga	2030	2022
22	Mark Romanchuk	Republican	Ontario	Ashland, Medina, Richland	2028	2020
23	Nickie Antonio	Democratic	Lakewood	Cuyahoga	2026	2018
24	Tom Patton	Republican	Strongsville	Cuyahoga	2032	2024
25	Bill DeMora	Democratic	Columbus	Franklin	2030	2022
26	Bill Reineke	Republican	Eden Township	Crawford, Marion, Morrow, Sandusky, Seneca, Union, Wyandot	2028	2020
27	Kristina Roegner	Republican	Hudson	Geauga, Portage, Summit	2026	2018
28	Casey Weinstein	Democratic	Hudson	Summit	2032	2024
29	Jane Timken	Republican	Canton	Stark	2034	2025
30	Brian Chavez	Republican	Marietta	Athens, Belmont, Guernsey, Harrison, Jefferson, Meigs, Monroe, Morgan, Noble, Washington	2032	2023
31	Al Landis	Republican	Dover	Guernsey, Muskingum, Stark, Tuscarawas, Wayne	2030	2022
32	Sandra O'Brien	Republican	Lenox Township	Ashtabula, Geauga, Trumbull	2028	2020
33	Alessandro Cutrona	Republican	Canfield	Carroll, Columbiana, Mahoning	2034	2024
