= 133rd Ohio General Assembly =

Meeting of the Ohio state legislature

←	132nd	134th	→
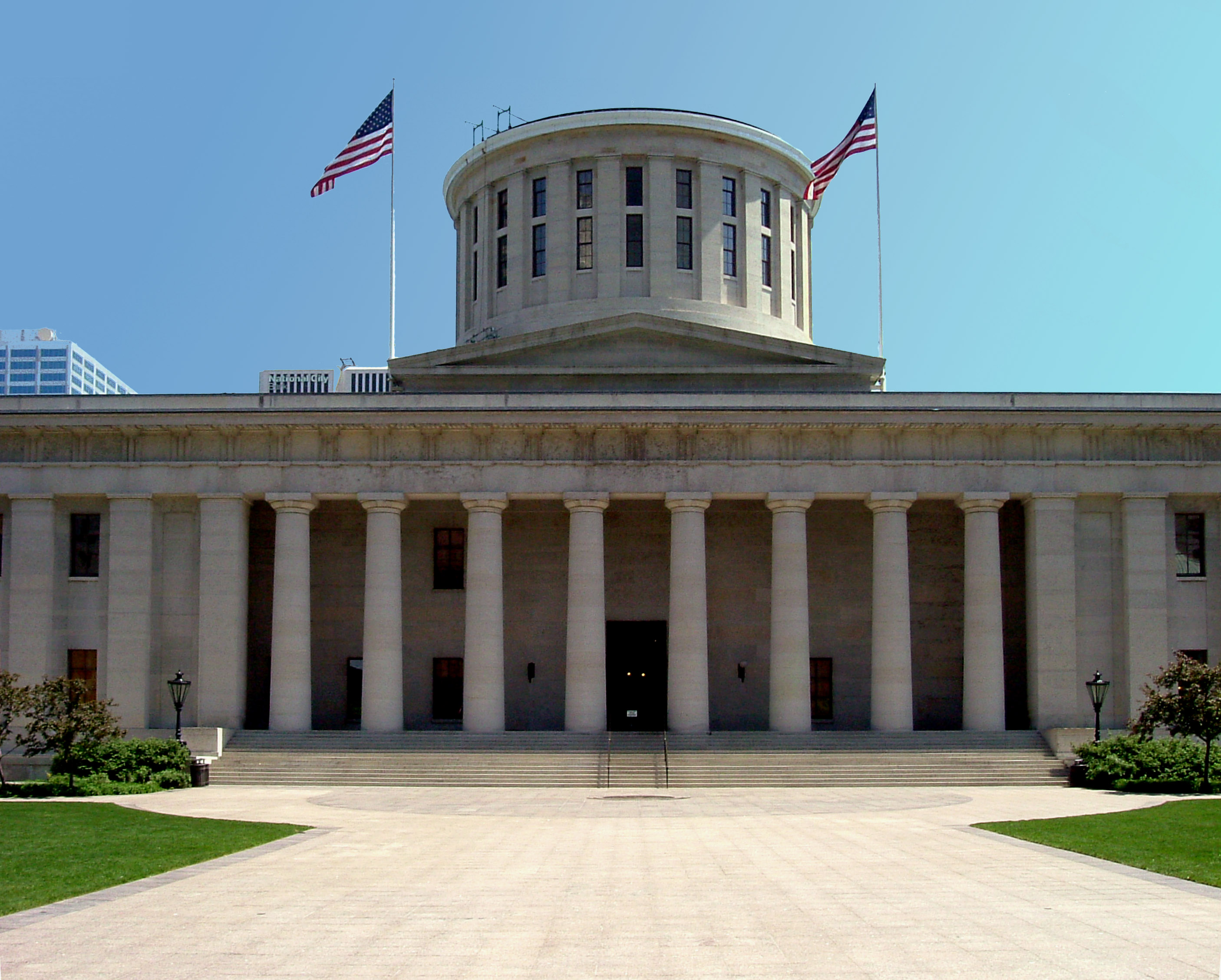
- Ohio Statehouse (2004)

Overview
- Term: January 7, 2019 – December 31, 2020

Ohio Senate
- Senate party standings
- Members: 33 (24 R, 9 D)
- President of the Senate: Larry Obhof (R)
- President Pro Tempore: Bob Peterson (R)
- Party control: Republican Party

Ohio House of Representatives
- House party standings
- Members: 99 (61 R, 38 D)
- House Speaker: Larry Householder (R) until July 30, 2020; Robert R. Cupp (R) from July 30, 2020
- Party control: Republican Party

Sessions
- 1st: January 7, 2019 – December 31, 2020

The One Hundred Thirty-Third Ohio General Assembly was a meeting of the Ohio state legislature, composed of the Ohio State Senate and the Ohio House of Representatives. It convened in Columbus, Ohio on January 7, 2019, and adjourned December 31, 2020. The apportionment of legislative districts was based on the 2010 United States census and 2011 redistricting plan. Both the Ohio Senate and Ohio House of Representatives were retained by the Ohio Republican Party.

== Party summary ==
Resignations and new members are discussed in the "Changes in membership" section, below.

=== Senate ===
	Party (Shading indicates majority caucus)		Total	Vacant
	Democratic	Republican	Total	Vacant
End of previous Assembly	9	24	33	0
Begin (January 7, 2019)	9	24	33	0
January 14, 2019	9	23	32	1
February 6, 2019	9	24	33	0
March 31, 2019	9	23	32	1
May 8, 2019	9	24	33	0
August 31, 2019	9	23	32	1
September 3, 2019	9	22	31	2
September 18, 2019	9	23	32	1
October 10, 2019	9	24	33	0
Latest voting share	27.3%	72.7%		

=== House of Representatives ===
	Party (Shading indicates majority caucus)		Total	Vacant
	Democratic	Republican	Total	Vacant
End of previous Assembly	33	65	98	1
Begin (January 7, 2019)	38	60	98	1
March 27, 2019	38	61	99	0
May 1, 2019	37	61	98	1
May 5, 2019	37	60	97	2
May 8, 2019	37	59	96	3
May 22, 2019	37	60	97	2
May 29, 2019	37	61	98	1
June 5, 2019	38	61	99	0
October 3, 2019	38	60	98	1
October 10, 2019	38	61	99	0
November 12, 2019	38	60	98	1
November 13, 2019	38	61	99	0
March 20, 2020	38	60	98	1
May 28, 2020	38	61	99	0
Latest voting share	38.4%	61.6%		

== Leadership ==
=== Senate ===
- Senate President: Larry Obhof
- President Pro Tempore: Bob Peterson

Majority (Republican) leadership

- Majority Floor Leader: Matt Huffman
- Majority Whip: Jay Hottinger

Minority (Democratic) leadership

- Senate Minority Leader: Kenny Yuko
- Assistant Minority Leader: Cecil Thomas
- Minority Whip: Sean O'Brien
- Assistant Minority Whip: Sandra Williams

=== House of Representatives ===
- Speaker of the House: Larry Householder, until July 30, 2020
  - Robert R. Cupp, from July 30, 2020
- Speaker Pro Tempore: Jim Butler

Majority (Republican) leadership

- Majority Floor Leader: Bill Seitz
- Assistant Majority Floor Leader: Anthony DeVitis
- Majority Whip: Jay Edwards
- Assistant Majority Whip: Laura Lanese

Minority (Democratic) leadership

- House Minority Leader: Emilia Sykes
- Assistant Minority Leader: Kristin Boggs
- Minority Whip: Kent Smith
- Assistant Minority Whip: Paula Hicks-Hudson

== Membership ==
=== Senate ===
District	Senator	Party	Residence	First elected	Term limited
1	Rob McColley	Republican	Napoleon	2017 (Appt.)	2026
2	Theresa Gavarone	Republican	Bowling Green	2019 (Appt.)	2028
3	Tina Maharath	Democratic	Canal Winchester	2018	2026
4	Bill Coley	Republican	Liberty Township	2011 (Appt.)	2020
5	Steve Huffman	Republican	Tipp City	2018	2026
6	Peggy Lehner	Republican	Kettering	2011 (Appt.)	2020
7	Steve Wilson	Republican	Maineville	2017 (Appt.)	2026
8	Louis Blessing	Republican	Colerain Township	2019 (Appt.)	2028
9	Cecil Thomas	Democratic	Cincinnati	2014	2022
10	Bob Hackett	Republican	London	2016 (Appt.)	2024
11	Teresa Fedor	Democratic	Toledo	2018	2026
12	Matt Huffman	Republican	Lima	2016	2024
13	Nathan Manning	Republican	North Ridgeville	2018	2026
14	Terry Johnson	Republican	McDermott	2019 (Appt.)	2028
15	Hearcel Craig	Democratic	Columbus	2018	2026
16	Stephanie Kunze	Republican	Columbus	2016	2024
17	Bob Peterson	Republican	Jasper Township	2012 (Appt.)	2022
18	John Eklund	Republican	Munson Township	2011 (Appt.)	2020
19	Andrew Brenner	Republican	Powell	2018	2026
20	Tim Schaffer	Republican	Lancaster	2019 (Appt.)	2028
21	Sandra Williams	Democratic	Cleveland	2014	2022
22	Larry Obhof	Republican	Montville Township	2011 (Appt.)	2020
23	Nickie Antonio	Democratic	Lakewood	2018	2026
24	Matt Dolan	Republican	Chagrin Falls	2016	2024
25	Kenny Yuko	Democratic	Richmond Heights	2014	2022
26	David Burke	Republican	Marysville	2011 (Appt.)	2020
27	Kristina Roegner	Republican	Hudson	2018	2026
28	Vernon Sykes	Democratic	Akron	2016	2024
29	Kirk Schuring	Republican	Canton	2018	2026
30	Frank Hoagland	Republican	Adena	2016	2024
31	Jay Hottinger	Republican	Newark	2014	2022
32	Sean O'Brien	Democratic	Hubbard	2016	2024
33	Michael Rulli	Republican	Salem	2018	2026

=== House of Representatives ===
District	Representative	Party	Residence	First elected	Term limited
1	Scott Wiggam	Republican	Wooster	2016	2024
2	Mark Romanchuk	Republican	Ontario	2012	2020
3	Haraz Ghanbari	Republican	Perrysburg	2019 (Appt.)	2028
4	Robert Cupp	Republican	Shawnee Township	2014	2022
5	Tim Ginter	Republican	Salem	2014	2022
6	Phil Robinson	Democratic	Cleveland	2018	2026
7	Tom Patton	Republican	Strongsville	2016	2024
8	Kent Smith	Democratic	Euclid	2014	2022
9	Janine Boyd	Democratic	Cleveland Heights	2014	2022
10	Terrence Upchurch	Democratic	Cleveland	2018	2026
11	Stephanie Howse	Democratic	Cleveland	2014	2022
12	Juanita Brent	Democratic	Cleveland	2018	2026
13	Michael Skindell	Democratic	Lakewood	2018	2026
14	Bride Rose Sweeney	Democratic	Cleveland	2018 (Appt.)	2026
15	Jeffrey Crossman	Democratic	Parma	2018	2026
16	David Greenspan	Republican	Westlake	2016	2024
17	Adam Miller	Democratic	Columbus	2016	2024
18	Kristin Boggs	Democratic	Columbus	2016 (Appt.)	2024
19	Mary Lightbody	Democratic	Westerville	2018	2026
20	Richard Brown	Democratic	Canal Winchester	2017 (Appt.)	2026
21	Beth Liston	Democratic	Dublin	2018	2026
22	David Leland	Democratic	Columbus	2014	2022
23	Laura Lanese	Republican	Grove City	2016	2024
24	Allison Russo	Democratic	Upper Arlington	2018	2026
25	Bernadine Kent	Democratic	Columbus	2016	2024
26	Erica Crawley	Democratic	Columbus	2018	2026
27	Tom Brinkman	Republican	Cincinnati	2014	2022
28	Jessica Miranda	Democratic	Forest Park	2018	2026
29	Cindy Abrams	Republican	Harrison	2019 (Appt.)	2028
30	Bill Seitz	Republican	Green Township	2016	2024
31	Brigid Kelly	Democratic	Cincinnati	2016	2024
32	Catherine Ingram	Democratic	Cincinnati	2016	2024
33	Sedrick Denson	Democratic	Cincinnati	2018	2026
34	Emilia Sykes	Democratic	Akron	2014	2022
35	Tavia Galonski	Democratic	Akron	2017 (Appt.)	2026
36	Anthony DeVitis	Republican	Green	2011 (Appt.)	2020
37	Casey Weinstein	Democratic	Hudson	2018	2026
38	Bill Roemer	Republican	Richfield	2018	2026
39	Fred Strahorn	Democratic	Dayton	2012	2020
40	Phil Plummer	Republican	Dayton	2018	2026
41	Jim Butler	Republican	Oakwood	2011 (Appt.)	2020
42	Niraj Antani	Republican	Miamisburg	2014 (Appt.)	2022
43	Jeffery Todd Smith	Republican	Germantown	2018 (Appt.)	2026
44	Paula Hicks-Hudson	Democratic	Toledo	2018	2026
45	Lisa Sobecki	Democratic	Toledo	2018	2026
46	Michael Sheehy	Democratic	Oregon	2013 (Appt.)	2022
47	Derek Merrin	Republican	Waterville	2016 (Appt.)	2024
48	Scott Oelslager	Republican	North Canton	2018	2026
49	Tom West	Democratic	Canton	2016	2024
50	Reggie Stoltzfus	Republican	Paris Township	2018	2026
51	Sara Carruthers	Republican	Hamilton	2018	2026
52	George Lang	Republican	West Chester	2017 (Appt.)	2026
53	Candice Keller	Republican	Middletown	2016 (Appt.)	2024
54	Paul Zeltwanger	Republican	Mason	2014	2022
55	Gayle Manning	Republican	North Ridgeville	2018	2026
56	Joe Miller	Democratic	Amherst	2018	2026
57	Dick Stein	Republican	Norwalk	2016	2024
58	Michele Lepore-Hagan	Democratic	Youngstown	2014	2022
59	Alessandro Cutrona	Republican	Canfield	2020 (Appt.)	2028
60	John Rogers	Democratic	Mentor-on-the-Lake	2012	2020
61	Jamie Callender	Republican	Concord Township	2018	2026
62	Scott Lipps	Republican	Franklin	2016	2024
63	Gil Blair	Democratic	Weathersfield Township	2019 (Appt.)	2028
64	Michael O'Brien	Democratic	Warren	2014	2022
65	John Becker	Republican	Union Township	2012	2020
66	Doug Green	Republican	Russellville	2012	2020
67	Kris Jordan	Republican	Powell	2018	2026
68	Rick Carfagna	Republican	Westerville	2016	2024
69	Steve Hambley	Republican	Brunswick	2014	2022
70	Darrell Kick	Republican	Loudonville	2016	2024
71	Mark Fraizer	Republican	Newark	2019 (Appt.)	2028
72	Larry Householder	Republican	Glenford	2016	2024
73	Rick Perales	Republican	Beavercreek	2012	2020
74	Bill Dean	Republican	Xenia	2016 (Appt.)	2024
75	Randi Clites	Democratic	Ravenna	2018	2026
76	Diane Grendell	Republican	Chesterland	2019 (Appt.)	2028
77	Jeffrey LaRe	Republican	Violet Township	2019 (Appt.)	2028
78	Ron Hood	Republican	Walnut Township	2012	2020
79	Kyle Koehler	Republican	German Township	2014	2022
80	Jena Powell	Republican	Arcanum	2018	2026
81	James Hoops	Republican	Napoleon	2018	2026
82	Craig Riedel	Republican	Defiance	2016	2024
83	Jon Cross	Republican	Kenton	2018	2026
84	Susan Manchester	Republican	Waynesfield	2018	2026
85	Nino Vitale	Republican	Union Township	2014	2022
86	Tracy Richardson	Republican	Marysville	2018	2026
87	Riordan McClain	Republican	Upper Sandusky	2018 (Appt.)	2026
88	Bill Reineke	Republican	Eden Township	2014	2022
89	Douglas Swearingen, Jr.	Republican	Huron	2019 (Appt.)	2028
90	Brian Baldridge	Republican	Cherry Fork	2018	2026
91	Shane Wilkin	Republican	Lynchburg	2018 (Appt.)	2026
92	Gary Scherer	Republican	Jackson Township	2012 (Appt.)	2020
93	Jason Stephens	Republican	Kitts Hill	2019 (Appt.)	2028
94	Jay Edwards	Republican	Nelsonville	2016	2024
95	Don Jones	Republican	Freeport	2018	2026
96	Jack Cera	Democratic	Pultney Township	2011 (Appt.)	2020
97	Adam Holmes	Republican	Nashport	2019 (Appt.)	2028
98	Brett Hillyer	Republican	Uhrichsville	2018	2026
99	John Patterson	Democratic	Jefferson	2012	2020

== Changes in membership ==
=== Senate ===
District	Predecessor	Reason for change	Successor	Date successor seated
2nd	Randy Gardner (R)	Gardner resigned to become a member of the Governor's Cabinet.	Theresa Gavarone (R)	February 6, 2019
20th	Brian Hill (R)	Hill resigned to serve as CEO of the Guernsey-Muskingum Electric Cooperative.	Tim Schaffer (R)	May 8, 2019
14th	Joe Uecker (R)	Uecker resigned to take a position with the Ohio Department of Transportation.	Terry Johnson (R)	September 18, 2019
8th	Louis Terhar (R)	Terhar resigned due to concerns about his declining health.	Louis Blessing (R)	October 10, 2019

=== House of Representatives ===
District	Predecessor	Reason for change	Successor	Date successor seated
97th	Vacant	Seat left vacant after Brian Hill was appointed to the Ohio Senate at the end of the 132nd General Assembly following his re-election to the 97th House district.	Adam Holmes (R)	February 6, 2019
3rd	Theresa Gavarone (R)	Gavarone resigned after being appointed to the Ohio Senate.	Haraz Ghanbari (R)	March 27, 2019
63rd	Glenn Holmes (D)	Holmes resigned after being appointed to the Ohio Parole Board.	Gil Blair (D)	June 5, 2019
76th	Sarah LaTourette (R)	LaTourette resigned after being appointed executive director of Ohio Family and Children First.	Diane Grendell (R)	May 29, 2019
77th	Tim Schaffer (R)	Schaffer resigned after being appointed to the Ohio Senate.	Jeffrey LaRe (R)	May 22, 2019
89th	Steve Arndt (R)	Arndt resigned after announcing his early retirement from politics.	Douglas Swearingen, Jr. (R)	August 1, 2019
93rd	Ryan Smith (R)	Smith resigned after being named President of the University of Rio Grande and Rio Grande Community College.	Jason Stephens (R)	October 10, 2019
29th	Louis Blessing (R)	Blessing resigned after being appointed to the Ohio Senate.	Cindy Abrams (R)	October 10, 2019
71st	Scott Ryan (R)	Ryan resigned to become executive director of Ohio Third Frontier.	Mark Fraizer (R)	November 13, 2019
59th	Don Manning (R)	Manning died March 20, 2020.	Alessandro Cutrona (R)	May 28, 2020

== Committees ==
Listed alphabetically by chamber, including Chairperson and Ranking Member.

=== Senate ===
Committee	Chair	Ranking Member
Agriculture and Natural Resources	Frank Hoagland	Sean O'Brien
Education	Peggy Lehner	Teresa Fedor
Energy and Public Utilities	Steve Wilson	Sandra Williams
Finance	Matt Dolan	Vernon Sykes
Government Oversight and Reform	Bill Coley	Hearcel Craig
Health, Human Services and Medicaid	David Burke	Nickie Antonio
Insurance and Financial Institutions	Bob Hackett	Hearcel Craig
Judiciary	John Eklund	Cecil Thomas
Local Government, Public Safety and Veterans Affairs	Nathan Manning	Tina Maharath
Rules and Reference	Larry Obhof	Kenny Yuko
Transportation, Commerce and Workforce	Rob McColley	Nickie Antonio
Ways and Means	Kristina Roegner	Sandra Williams

=== House of Representatives ===
Committee	Chair	Ranking Member
Aging and Long Term Care	Tim Ginter	Stephanie Howse
Agriculture and Rural Development	J. Kyle Koehler	Juanita Brent
Armed Services and Veterans Affairs	Rick Perales	Casey Weinstein
Civil Justice	Stephen Hambley	Richard Brown
Commerce and Labor	Gayle Manning	Michele Lepore-Hagan
Criminal Justice	George Lang	David Leland
Economic and Workforce Development	Paul Zeltwanger	Lisa Sobecki
Energy and Natural Resources	A. Nino Vitale	Sedrick Denson
Federalism	John Becker	Adam Miller
Finance	Scott Oelslager Jamie Callender	Jack Cera
Financial Institutions	Kris Jordan	Jeffrey Crossman
Health	Scott Lipps	Janine Boyd
Higher Education	Candice Keller	Catherine Ingram
Insurance	Thomas Brinkman, Jr.	Kristin Boggs
Primary and Secondary Education	Don Jones	Phillip Robinson, Jr.
Public Utilities	Jamie Callender	Kent Smith
Rules and Reference	Robert R. Cupp	Emilia Sykes
State and Local Government	Scott Wiggam	Brigid Kelly
Transportation and Public Safety	Doug Green	Michael Sheehy
Ways and Means	Derek Merrin	John Rogers

== See also ==
- List of Ohio state legislatures
