= Ohio's 69th House of Representatives district =

American legislative district

Ohio's 69th State House of Representatives district
Representative
| Kevin D. Miller; R–Newark |
- Population (2020): 120,418

Ohio's 69th House of Representatives district is one of 99 districts in the Ohio House of Representatives. The district contains portions of Fairfield, Licking, and Perry counties. It is currently represented by Republican Kevin D. Miller.

== List of members representing the district ==
| Member | Party | Years | General Assembly | Electoral history |
|---|---|---|---|---|
District established January 2, 1967.
| Bill Bowen (Cincinnati) | Democratic | January 3, 1967– February 11, 1970 | 107th 108th | Elected in 1966. Re-elected in 1968. Resigned following appointment to Ohio Senate. |
| Ed Burden (Cincinnati) | Democratic | February 11, 1970– December 31, 1970 | 108th | Appointed in 1970. Lost renomination. |
| James Rankin (Cincinnati) | Democratic | January 3, 1971 – December 31, 1972 | 109th | Elected in 1970. Redistricted to the 25th district. |
| John Galbraith (Maumee) | Republican | January 3, 1973 – December 31, 1976 | 110th 111th 112th 113th 114th | Redistricted from the 76th district and re-elected in 1972. Re-elected in 1974. Re-elected in 1976. Re-elected in 1978. Re-elected in 1980. Redistricted to the 48th district. |
| John Galbraith (Maumee) | Democratic | January 3, 1977 – December 31, 1982 | 110th 111th 112th 113th 114th | Redistricted from the 76th district and re-elected in 1972. Re-elected in 1974. Re-elected in 1976. Re-elected in 1978. Re-elected in 1980. Redistricted to the 48th district. |
| Clifton Skeen (Akron) | Democratic | January 3, 1983– December 31, 1992 | 115th 116th 117th 118th 119th | Redistricted from the 43rd district and re-elected in 1982. Re-elected in 1984. Re-elected in 1986. Re-elected in 1988. Re-elected in 1990. Retired. |
| Ray Sines (Perry, Ohio) | Republican | January 3, 1993– December 31, 1996 | 120th 121st | Redistricted from the 61st district and re-elected in 1992. Re-elected in 1994. Lost renomination. |
| Ron Young (LeRoy Township) | Republican | January 3, 1997– December 31, 2002 | 122nd 123rd 124th | Elected in 1996. Re-elected in 1998. Re-elected in 2000. Redistricted to the 63rd district. |
| Chuck Calvert (Rittman) | Republican | January 3, 2003– December 31, 2006 | 125th 126th | Redistricted from the 81st district and re-elected in 2002. Re-elected in 2004. Term-limited. |
| William G. Batchelder (Medina) | Republican | January 2, 2007 – December 31, 2014 | 127th 128th 129th 130th | Elected in 2006. Re-elected in 2008. Re-elected in 2010. Re-elected in 2012. Term-limited. |
| Steve Hambley (Brunswick) | Republican | January 3, 2015 – December 31, 2020 | 131st 132nd 133rd | Elected in 2014. Re-elected in 2016. Re-elected in 2018. Retired to run for Medina County Commissioner. |
| Sharon Ray (Wadsworth) | Republican | January 4, 2021 – December 31, 2022 | 134th | Elected in 2020. Redistricted to the 66th district. |
| Kevin D. Miller (Newark) | Republican | January 3, 2023 – present | 135th 136th | Redistricted from the 72nd district and re-elected in 2022. Re-elected in 2024. |

== Election results ==
=== 2026 ===
Republican primary
| Party | Candidate | Votes | % |
|---|---|---|---|
| Republican | Kevin D. Miller | 10,232 | 100.0% |
| Total votes | | 10,232 | 100.0% |

Democratic primary
| Party | Candidate | Votes | % |
|---|---|---|---|
| Democratic | Amy Rigsby | 3,777 | 100.0% |
| Total votes | | 3,777 | 100.0% |

=== 2024 ===
Republican primary
| Party | Candidate | Votes | % |
|---|---|---|---|
| Republican | Kevin D. Miller | 9,907 | 60.2% |
| Republican | Daniel Kalmbach | 6,539 | 39.8% |
| Total votes | | 16,446 | 100.0% |

Democratic primary
| Party | Candidate | Votes | % |
|---|---|---|---|
| Democratic | Jamie Hough | 2,853 | 100.0% |
| Total votes | | 2,853 | 100.0% |

Ohio's 69th House District 2024 General Election
| Party | Candidate | Votes | % |
|---|---|---|---|
| Republican | Kevin D. Miller | 46,445 | 76.8% |
| Democratic | Jamie Hough | 14,048 | 23.2% |
| Total votes | | 60,493 | 100.0% |
| Republican hold | | | |

=== 2022 ===
Republican primary
| Party | Candidate | Votes | % |
|---|---|---|---|
| Republican | Kevin D. Miller | 3,618 | 100.0% |
| Total votes | | 3,618 | 100.0% |

Democratic primary
| Party | Candidate | Votes | % |
|---|---|---|---|
| Democratic | Charlotte Owens | 1,502 | 100.0% |
| Total votes | | 1,502 | 100.0% |

Ohio's 69th House District 2022 General Election
| Party | Candidate | Votes | % |
|---|---|---|---|
| Republican | Kevin D. Miller | 33,889 | 73.2% |
| Democratic | Charlotte Owens | 12,439 | 26.8% |
| Total votes | | 46,328 | 100.0% |
| Republican hold | | | |

=== 2020 ===
Republican primary
| Party | Candidate | Votes | % |
|---|---|---|---|
| Republican | Sharon Ray | 7,679 | 100.0% |
| Total votes | | 7,679 | 100.0% |

Democratic primary
| Party | Candidate | Votes | % |
|---|---|---|---|
| Democratic | Donna Beheydt | 7,001 | 100.0% |
| Total votes | | 7,001 | 100.0% |

Ohio's 69th House District 2020 General Election
| Party | Candidate | Votes | % |
|---|---|---|---|
| Republican | Sharon Ray | 46,103 | 64.8% |
| Democratic | Donna Beheydt | 25,074 | 35.2% |
| Total votes | | 71,177 | 100.0% |
| Republican hold | | | |

=== 2018 ===
Republican primary
| Party | Candidate | Votes | % |
|---|---|---|---|
| Republican | Steve Hambley | 10,082 | 100.0% |
| Total votes | | 10,082 | 100.0% |

Democratic primary
| Party | Candidate | Votes | % |
|---|---|---|---|
| Democratic | Carol Brenstuhl | 5,350 | 100.0% |
| Total votes | | 5,350 | 100.0% |

Ohio's 69th House District 2018 General Election
| Party | Candidate | Votes | % |
|---|---|---|---|
| Republican | Steve Hambley | 33,236 | 63.7% |
| Democratic | Carol Brenstuhl | 18,926 | 36.3% |
| Total votes | | 52,162 | 100.0% |
| Republican hold | | | |

=== 2016 ===
Republican primary
| Party | Candidate | Votes | % |
|---|---|---|---|
| Republican | Steve Hambley | 14,009 | 68.10% |
| Republican | Chris Sawicki | 6,563 | 31.90% |
| Total votes | | 20,572 | 100.0% |

Democratic primary
| Party | Candidate | Votes | % |
|---|---|---|---|
| Democratic | Frank Zona | 6,708 | 100.0% |
| Total votes | | 6,708 | 100.0% |

Ohio's 69th House District 2016 General Election
| Party | Candidate | Votes | % |
|---|---|---|---|
| Republican | Steve Hambley | 40,972 | 68.73% |
| Democratic | Carol Brenstuhl | 18,639 | 31.27% |
| Total votes | | 59,611 | 100.0% |
| Republican hold | | | |

=== 2014 ===
Republican primary
| Party | Candidate | Votes | % |
|---|---|---|---|
| Republican | Steve Hambley | 4,113 | 61.1% |
| Republican | Chris Sawicki | 2,614 | 38.9% |
| Total votes | | 6,727 | 100.0% |

Ohio's 69th House District 2014 General Election
| Party | Candidate | Votes | % |
|---|---|---|---|
| Republican | Steve Hambley | 23,179 | 69.3% |
| Democratic | Richard Javorek | 10,197 | 30.5% |
| Write-in | Gregg Depew | 49 | 0.1% |
| Total votes | | 33,425 | 100.0% |
| Republican hold | | | |

=== 2012 ===
Ohio's 69th House District 2012 General Election
| Party | Candidate | Votes | % |
|---|---|---|---|
| Republican | William G. Batchelder | 35,486 | 60.6% |
| Democratic | Judith A. Cross | 23,047 | 39.4% |
| Total votes | | 58,533 | 100.0% |
| Republican hold | | | |

=== 2010 ===
Ohio's 69th House District 2010 General Election
| Party | Candidate | Votes | % |
|---|---|---|---|
| Republican | William G. Batchelder | 32,406 | 70.3% |
| Democratic | Jack Schira | 13,666 | 29.7% |
| Total votes | | 46,072 | 100.0% |
| Republican hold | | | |

=== 2008 ===
Ohio's 69th House District 2008 General Election
| Party | Candidate | Votes | % |
|---|---|---|---|
| Republican | William G. Batchelder | 38,684 | 63.2% |
| Democratic | Jack Schira | 22,505 | 36.8% |
| Total votes | | 61,189 | 100.0% |
| Republican hold | | | |

=== 2006 ===
Ohio's 69th House District 2006 General Election
| Party | Candidate | Votes | % |
|---|---|---|---|
| Republican | William G. Batchelder | 26,302 | 55.5% |
| Democratic | Jack Schira | 21,116 | 44.5% |
| Total votes | | 47,418 | 100.0% |
| Republican hold | | | |
