= Mike Loychik =

American politician (born 1989)

Member of the Ohio House of Representatives from the 65th district
- In office January 3, 2023 – January 6, 2025
- Preceded by: Jean Schmidt
- Succeeded by: David Thomas

Member of the Ohio House of Representatives from the 63rd district
- In office January 4, 2021 – December 31, 2022
- Preceded by: Gil Blair
- Succeeded by: Adam Bird

Personal details
- Born: Michael Loychik; April 7, 1989 (age 37) Warren, Ohio
- Party: Republican
- Children: 2
- Education: Champion High School
- Alma mater: Community College of the Air Force; Columbia Southern University
- Profession: Small business owner

Military service
- Allegiance: United States
- Branch/service: United States Air Force
- Years of service: 2008–2015
- Rank: Staff Sergeant

Michael Loychik (born April 7, 1989) is an American politician who has served as a member of the Ohio House of Representatives since 2021, representing the 65th district. He won the seat after defeating incumbent Democrat Gil Blair, 54.2% to 45.8%. He served in the United States Air Force from 2008 to 2015.

== Life and career ==
After graduating from Champion High School, Loychik enlisted in the Air Force in 2008. He served for eight years, where he was a C-130 crew chief with a special operations group, as well as a combat search and rescue group. He retired as a staff sergeant. During his time in the Air Force, he earned his associate degree in aviation and maintenance technology at Community College of the Air Force. Following his service, he started his own business, Atlantic Pressure Washing Solutions LLC. He later earned his Bachelor of Applied Science in Environmental Management at Columbia Southern University. He currently resides in Niles, Ohio with his two children.

== Ohio House of Representatives ==
Loychik was elected to the Ohio House of Representatives in 2020, defeating incumbent Democrat Gil Blair. Blair had been appointed to the seat in 2019 following the resignation of Glenn Holmes who took a position in Governor Mike DeWine's administration.

Redistricting took place following the 2020 census, resulting in new district lines and numbers. The district changed to include most of Trumbull and Ashtabula Counties. In 2022, Loychik had a primary challenge by Randy Law, former State Representative and perennial candidate. Loychik beat Law, receiving over 70% of the vote. He went on in the general election to defeat independent candidate Jennifer Donnelly, receiving over 65% of the vote.

In 2023, Loychik, who was still able to seek two additional terms in the House before being term limited, decided to run for the Ohio Senate in District 32. He challenged incumbent State Senator Sandra O'Brien, but was defeated in the Republican primary on March 19, 2024, receiving a little over 36% of the vote.

== Electoral history ==
Election results
Year	Office	Election	Votes for Loychik	%	Opponent	Party	Votes	%
2020	Ohio House of Representatives	General	29,999	54.2%	Gil Blair	Democrat	25,379	45.8%
2022	Ohio House of Representatives	General	27,274	65.76%	Jennifer Donnelly	Independent	14,199	34.24%
