= Italian American Congressional Delegation =

The Italian American Congressional Delegation (IACD) is a bipartisan congressional caucus composed of nearly 200 Members of Congress: twenty-nine who trace their ancestry to Italy and more than 150 Associate IACD Members who, although not Italian American, have an interest in the Italian American Community.

The IACD is currently chaired by Rosa DeLauro (CT-3) and Michael Rulli (OH-6) of the U.S. House of Representatives.

Italian American groups occasionally work with the IACD on issues of importance to the Italian American community and to advance U.S.-Italy political, cultural and trade relations.

== Senate membership ==
- John Barrasso (R–WY)
- Catherine Cortez Masto (D–NV)
- Ted Cruz (R–TX)

== House membership ==
- Robert Aderholt (R–AL)
- Mark Amodei (R–NV)
- Suzanne Bonamici (D–OR)
- David Cicilline (D–RI)
- Anthony D'Esposito (R-NY)
- Diana DeGette (D–CO)
- Rosa DeLauro (D–CT)
- Suzan DelBene (D–WA)
- Chris Deluzio (D-PA)
- Chuck Fleischmann (R–TN)
- Virginia Foxx (R–NC)
- John Garamendi (D–CA)
- Brian Higgins (D-NY)
- Nick LaLota (R-NY)
- Doug LaMalfa (R–CA)
- John B. Larson (D–CT)
- Mike Lawler (R-NY)
- Kevin McCarthy (R–CA)
- Lisa McClain (R-MI)
- Carol Miller (R-WV)
- Marc Molinaro (R-NY)
- Joseph Morelle (D-NY)
- Frank Pallone (D–NJ)
- Jimmy Panetta (D–CA)
- Nancy Pelosi (D–CA)
- Scott Peters (D–CA)
- Steve Scalise (R–LA)
- Darren Soto (D–FL)
- Elise Stefanik (R–NY)
- Mike Thompson (D–CA)
- Brad Wenstrup (R–OH)
- Jennifer Wexton (D-VA)

== Caucus members ==
- Sen. Sherrod Brown
- Sen. Ben Cardin
- Sen. Thomas R. Carper
- Sen. Dianne Feinstein (deceased)
- Sen. Charles Grassley
- Sen. Robert Menendez
- Sen. Charles Schumer
- Sen. Debbie Stabenow
- Sen. Chris Van Hollen
- Rep. Gus Bilirakis
- Rep. Rob Bishop
- Rep. William Lacy Clay
- Rep. Jim Costa
- Rep. Joseph Crowley
- Rep. Henry Cuellar
- Rep. Danny K. Davis
- Rep. Eliot L. Engel
- Rep. Raúl Manuel Grijalva
- Rep. Alcee Hastings
- Rep. Shelia Jackson Lee
- Rep. Eddie Bernice Johnson
- Rep. Marcy Kaptur
- Rep. James R. Langevin
- Rep. John B. Larson
- Rep. Barbara Lee
- Rep. Sander Levin
- Rep. Dan Lipinski
- Rep. Zoe Lofgren
- Rep. Nita Lowey
- Rep. Stephen Lynch
- Rep. Edward Markey
- Rep. Betty McCollum
- Rep. Gregory W. Meeks
- Rep. Jerrold Nadler
- Rep. Grace Napolitano
- Rep. Richard Neal
- Del. Eleanor Holmes Norton
- Rep. Ileana Ros-Lehtinen
- Rep. Lucille Roybal-Allard
- Rep. Linda T. Sánchez
- Rep. Albio Sires
- Rep. Jan Schakowsky
- Rep. José E. Serrano
- Rep. Bill Shuster
- Rep. Christopher Smith
- Rep. Fred Upton
- Rep. Maxine Waters
- Rep. Joe Wilson

== Past members ==
- Joe Manchin (D–WV)
- Mike Arcuri (D–NY)
- John Baldacci (D–ME)
- Lou Barletta (R–PA)
- Kerry Bentivolio (R–MI)
- John Boccieri (D–OH)
- Bob Brady (D–PA)
- Anthony Brindisi (D–NY)
- Ginny Brown-Waite (R–FL)
- Ann Marie Buerkle (R–NY)
- Mike Capuano (D–MA)
- Travis Childers (D–MS)
- Ryan Costello (R–PA)
- Chip Cravaack (R–MN)
- Ron DeSantis (R–FL)
- Peter DeFazio (D-OR)
- Pete Domenici (R–NM)
- John Ensign (R–NV)
- Mike Enzi (R–WY)
- John Faso (R–NY)
- Mike Ferguson (R–NJ)
- Jeff Fortenberry (R-NE)
- Vito Fossella (R–NY)
- Jim Gerlach (R–PA)
- Greg Gianforte (R–MT)
- Michael Grimm (R–NY)
- Felix Grucci (R–NY)
- Frank Guinta (R–NH)
- Debbie Halvorson (D–IL)
- Melissa Hart (R–PA)
- Joe Heck (R–NV)
- Peter T. King (R-NY)
- John LaFalce (D–NY)
- Nick Lampson (D–TX)
- Mary Landrieu (D–LA)
- Patrick Leahy (D–VT)
- Frank LoBiondo (R–NJ)
- Dan Maffei (D–NY)
- Don Manzullo (R–IL)
- Tom Marino (R–PA)
- Frank Mascara (D–PA)
- John Mica (R–FL)
- George Miller (D–CA)
- Connie Morella (R–MD)
- Jim Oberstar (D–MN)
- Steven Palazzo (R-MS)
- Tom Perriello (D–VA)
- Mike Pompeo (R–KS)
- Jim Renacci (R–OH)
- Rick Renzi (R–AZ)
- Marge Roukema (R–NJ)
- Tim Ryan (D–OH)
- Rick Santorum (R–PA)
- Ross Spano (R–FL)
- Tom Tancredo (R–CO)
- Pat Tiberi (R–OH)
- Robert Torricelli (D–NJ)
- David Trott (R–MI)
- Dave Weldon (R–FL)
