= Ohio's 33rd senatorial district =

American legislative district

Ohio's 33rd State Senate district
Senator
Alessandro Cutrona; R–Canfield
- Demographics: 80.6% White; 12% Black; 4.5% Hispanic; 1% Asian; 1.9% Native American; 0.1% Hawaiian/Pacific Islander
- Population (2020) • Voting age • Citizens of voting age: 357,212; 286,136; 283,685

After the 2023 redistricting, Ohio's 33rd senatorial district continues to be Columbiana and Mahoning Counties. The Ohio House districts included in the district are now numbered 58, 59 and 79.

The current Ohio Senator is Republican Alessandro Cutrona and was reelected for another term in November 2026.

== 2026 election results ==
Al Cutrona (R) 72,172 54.5%

Michael Kripchat (D) 60,350 45.5%

== Historically ==
The district has been based in the Mahoning Valley. It consisted of the counties of Columbiana and Mahoning. It encompasses Ohio House of Representatives districts 5, 58 and 59. The district was represented by the Senate President from 1983 to 1984 with Senator Harry Meshel. It has a Cook PVI of R+9.

== List of senators ==
Senator	Party	Term	Notes
Charles Carney	Democrat	January 3, 1951 – November 30, 1970	Carney was elected to the United States Congress in 1970.
Harry Meshel	Democrat	January 3, 1971 – April 13, 1993	Meshel served as Senate President and resigned to serve as Chairman of the Ohio Democratic Party.
Joe Vukovich	Democrat	April 21, 1993 – February 5, 1997	Vukovich resigned to become a judge on the Ohio Seventh District Court of Appeals.
Bob Hagan	Democrat	February 5, 1997 – December 31, 2006	Hagan was term-limited in 2006.
John Boccieri	Democrat	January 2, 2007 – December 31, 2008	Boccieri resigned after winning election to the United States House of Representatives.
Joe Schiavoni	Democrat	January 5, 2009 – December 31, 2018	Schiavoni was term-limited in 2018.
Michael Rulli	Republican	January 3, 2019 – June 12, 2024	Rulli resigned after winning election to the United States House of Representatives.
Alessandro Cutrona	Republican	June 26, 2024 – present	Incumbent
