= Sylvester Patton =

American politician

Sylvester Patton, Jr.

Member of the Ohio House of Representatives from the 60th district
- In office February 8, 1997 – December 31, 2006
- Preceded by: Bob Hagan
- Succeeded by: Bob Hagan

Personal details
- Party: Democratic
- Spouse: Juanell Patton
- Children: 2
- Education: None
- Occupation: Marketing manager

Sylvester Patton is a former member of the Ohio House of Representatives, succeeded by Bob Hagan.

== Biography ==
=== Marriage and children ===
Married to the former Juanell C. Spooney, they have two children; Rev. Dr. Sylvester Delaney Patton, III (M.A, M.Div, D.Min) and Marcus Patton (MBA, candidate for Ph.D in Sport Marketing)
