= Timothy J. Cassell =

American politician

Tim Cassell

Member of the Ohio House of Representatives from the 63rd district
- In office January 3, 2005-December 31, 2006
- Preceded by: Ron Young
- Succeeded by: Carol-Ann Schindel

Personal details
- Party: Democratic

Tim Cassell is a former member of the Ohio House of Representatives, serving from 2004 to 2006.
