= Carol-Ann Schindel =

American politician

Member of the Ohio House of Representatives from the 63rd district
- In office January 2, 2007-December 31, 2008
- Preceded by: Timothy J. Cassell
- Succeeded by: Mark Schneider

Personal details
- Party: Republican

Carol-Ann Schindel is a former Republican member of the Ohio House of Representatives, representing the 63rd District from 2007 to 2008.
