= Michael O'Brien (Ohio politician) =

American politician (born 1955)

Member of the Ohio House of Representatives from the 64th district
- In office January 3, 2015 – December 31, 2022
- Preceded by: Tom Letson
- Succeeded by: Nick Santucci

Personal details
- Born: June 18, 1955 (age 71)
- Party: Democratic
- Education: John F. Kennedy High School; Youngstown State University

Michael J. O'Brien (born June 18, 1955) is the Representative of the 64th district of the Ohio House of Representatives. O'Brien is a lifelong resident of the Mahoning Valley and graduate from John F. Kennedy High School as well as Youngstown State University. O'Brien served on Warren City Council from 1983 to 1993 before being elected as a Trumbull County Commissioner in 1994. He served as a commissioner for ten years before being elected Mayor of Warren in 2005, serving until 2012. O'Brien announced in early 2014 that he would seek a seat in the Ohio House of Representatives to replace Tom Letson who was term-limited. He would win a three-way primary race with 60% of the vote for the Democratic nomination. He faced former Republican state Representative Randy Law in the general election, in what became a very tight race. He defeated Law 49%-44% to take the seat. His district includes half of Trumbull County and the southern portion of Ashtabula County.

In 2005, Mayor Michael J. O'Brien was fined by the Ohio Ethics Committee for mishandling campaign contributions.

"According to a complaint filed in July by Victor V. Vigluicci, special prosecutor in Trumbull County, O'Brien from 2000 to 2003 received $2,035 in campaign contributions that were deposited into the joint personal checking account with his wife, or the personal savings of son Dominic and Louise O'Brien."

== Links ==
- campaign Facebook page
- campaign site
