= Bride Rose Sweeney =

American politician (born 1992)

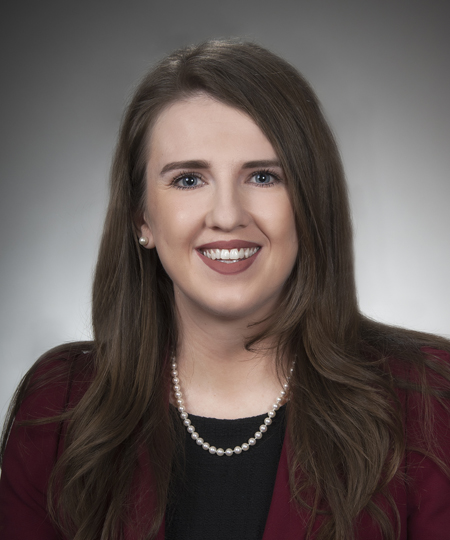
- Official portrait, c. 2018

Member-elect of the Ohio Senate from the 23rd district
- Assuming office January 4, 2027
- Succeeding: Nickie Antonio

Member of the Ohio House of Representatives from the 16th district
- Incumbent
- Assumed office November 14, 2018
- Preceded by: Martin J. Sweeney

Personal details
- Born: July 21, 1992 (age 34) Cleveland, Ohio, U.S.
- Party: Democratic
- Education: John Carroll University (BA)
- Website: http://www.ohiohouse.gov/bride-rose-sweeney

Bride Rose Sweeney is a three-term Democratic member of the Ohio House of Representatives for Western Cuyahoga County, serving as Ranking Member of the Ohio House Finance Committee and the lead Democratic sponsor of the bipartisan Fair School Funding Plan that became law on July 1, 2021. Sweeney is also the only woman on the Ohio Controlling Board, which oversees the release of taxpayer dollars.

When she was elected in November 2018, Sweeney became the first woman ever to represent her district at the Statehouse and the youngest Democratic member of the 133rd Ohio General Assembly.

== Life and career ==
Bride Rose Sweeney (born on July 21, 1992) is named after her Irish-American grandmother Bride Ann Sweeney. She attended Saint Joseph Academy and then John Carroll University, where she earned her Bachelor of Arts and studied political science, business, and leadership.

After college, Sweeney obtained a fellowship from Ohio’s Legislative Service Commission. This is a program that enables fellows to obtain experience in the legislature and other areas of public service. Before her election to the Ohio House, she worked in a variety of roles in the Ohio Senate, including as a senior advisor to the Minority Leader and a legislative aide to Senator Lou Gentile, an Appalachian Democrat.

Representative Sweeney has been named Democratic Rising Star by Cleveland.com for three years in a row. In 2022, she was recognized by the Ohio Election Officials Association as a leading voice for democracy and voting rights.

She is the daughter of Martin J. Sweeney, who is a former President of Cleveland City Council and a member of the 131st and 132nd Ohio General Assembly.

== Ohio House of Representatives ==
=== Elections ===
Rep. Sweeney was first elected to the Ohio House of Representatives in the general election on November 6, 2018, winning 72 percent of the vote over 28 percent of Libertarian candidate Ryan McClain. Shortly after the election, the Ohio House Democratic Caucus appointed her to fill the vacancy in the seat she had just won, allowing her to take office early. Notably, she was uncontested in her 2020 primary election after having to clear a four-person primary on May 8, 2018.

Rep. Sweeney sought re-election to a second term on November 3, 2020 against a Republican opponent. She won a clear victory, beating her opponent by a 16.9% margin and with 58.4% of the total vote. In her district, Sweeney won by a 6% larger margin and with 3.6% more votes than Joe Biden, who still carried it by a strong 10.9% margin. Some of her success may be attributed to keeping Brook Park and other working-class areas solidly in her column.

Sweeney Election History: 14th/16th Ohio House District
Year	Democrat	Votes	Pct	Republican	Votes	Pct
2018	Bride Rose Sweeney	23,481	72.0%	Ryan McClain	9,143	28.0%
2020	Bride Rose Sweeney	27,618	58.4%	Lynn McMahan	19,643	41.6%
2022	Bride Rose Sweeney	28,469	55.3%	Michael Lamb	23,020	44.7%

=== Committees ===
In the 133rd General Assembly, Rep. Sweeney served on the Finance Committee, the Commerce and Labor Committee, the Insurance Committee, and as Ranking Member of the Finance Subcommittee on High Education.

In the 134th General Assembly, Rep. Sweeney serves as the Ranking Member of the Finance Committee, as well as on the Finance Subcommittee on Primary and Secondary Education, the Financial Institutions Committee, the Insurance Committee. Prior to her appointment as Finance Ranking Member, she was the Ranking Member of the Government Oversight Committee.
