= Adam Bird =

American politician (born 1965)

Member of the Ohio House of Representatives from the 63rd district
- Incumbent
- Assumed office January 3, 2023
- Preceded by: Mike Loychik

Member of the Ohio House of Representatives from the 66th district
- In office January 4, 2021 – December 31, 2022
- Preceded by: Doug Green
- Succeeded by: Sharon Ray

Personal details
- Born: 1965 (age 60–61)
- Party: Republican
- Spouse: Tami
- Children: 2

Adam C. Bird (born 1965) is an American politician who has served in the Ohio House of Representatives since 2021, representing Ohio's 63rd district. He won the seat after incumbent Doug Green became term–limited after his fourth term in office. He won virtually unopposed in 2020, winning 95.9% to 4.1% to write–in candidates.

== Political positions ==
=== Transgender rights ===
In 2024, Bird introduced a bill which would ban transgender people from bathrooms that align with their gender identity in schools. The bill was passed and signed into law on November 27, 2024.
