= Ohio Fair School Funding Plan (HB 1) =

HB 1 is a bill introduced in the Ohio House of Representatives in 2021.

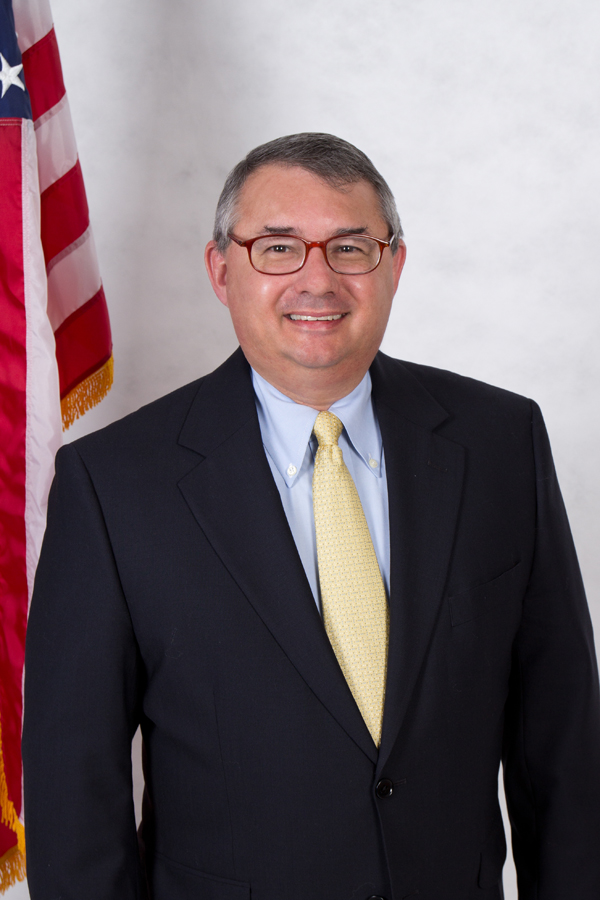
The primary Republican author of the bill is Ohio State Rep. Jamie Callender.

The Ohio Fair School Funding Plan is bipartisan legislation introduced in the Ohio House of Representatives as House Bill 1 (“HB 1”) by Republican Rep. Jamie Callender and Democratic Rep. Bride Rose Sweeney. The bill creates a new school financing system for K-12 education in the State of Ohio, overhauling the state's school funding system that the Ohio Supreme Court found unconstitutional four times beginning with the original DeRolph decision in 1997. HB 1 was signed into law on July 1, 2021 as a part of the biennial state operating budget.

== Background ==
In recent decades, Ohio’s Supreme Court has ruled four different times that Ohio’s method of funding schools violates the state constitution. As a result of those rulings, Ohio’s legislators have made several attempts to reform Ohio’s school funding system. The Ohio Fair School Funding Plan and its predecessors from prior legislative sessions are the first major attempts at a large-scale overhaul in Ohio in decades.

Currently, the state’s education funding law is an attempt to “equalize education for all Ohio children, regardless of how rich or poor their community is,” according to the Cleveland Plain-Dealer. Most school districts are in one of two categories: districts where local property taxes are not sufficient to pay for school funding, and districts with higher property values that have a cap placed on how much state funding they get.

According to Ohio Senate President Matt Huffman, decades ago Ohio spent half of all education funding on teachers' salaries. Presently, it is only 30 percent. In his proposed biennial state budget released in February 2021, Ohio Governor Mike DeWine did not include any changes to the state’s funding formula.

In 2021, the base cost per pupil that the state pays to local schools is at $6,020. Proponents of the legislation argue that it is a broken formula that arrives at that dollar amount, as it “has no tether to actual costs or quality.”

== Legislation ==
=== Overview ===
Reps. Callender and Sweeney introduced the Ohio Fair School Funding Plan (“HB 1”) in early 2021. HB 1 creates a new funding formula for the state’s primary and secondary education system. The bill and its provisions are the outcome of a legislative coalition called the Fair School Funding Workgroup, which was tasked in 2019 with studying the state’s education funding formula and returning with ideas on how to improve and modernize it.

Under the legislation, state funding for K-12 education would be made as direct payments to schools, rather than bundled funding to school districts. The bill would use not only property values but also the incomes of local residents when determining how much the state will give to school districts and how much districts will have to raise on their own.

The bill also creates new categories of state education funding, including special education, gifted education, English as a second language (ESL), and transportation. It also includes a boost for schools in economically disadvantaged areas. Career technical education funding also is increased under the provisions in the legislation.

To fully implement the bill, the state would need to add approximately $2 billion onto the existing $8 billion it currently spends. Ohio’s Legislative Service Commission estimated that statewide cost per pupil under the bill, if signed into law, would be $7,202 per year.

=== Legislative history and activity ===
The legislation was originally introduced during the 2019-2020 session of the Ohio legislature as HB 305, known as the Cupp-Patterson Fair School Funding Plan. During that session, the Ohio House voted almost unanimously in favor of the bill by a vote of 87-9 in December 2020. The Ohio Senate, however, rejected the legislation. By and large, senators favored education reform but wanted to see changes to the bill. The 2019 bill was known as the. It had 72 co-sponsors and passed the house in December 2020 by a vote of 87-9.

After HB 1 was introduced in 2021, it was referred to the House Finance Committee which held a hearing on the bill on February 11. The main sponsors, Reps. Callender and Sweeney, testified in favor of their bill. During their testimony, they spoke about the underlying need for reform and recapped how the bill’s reforms came to fruition. They said:

“In the fall of 2017, then Representative, now Speaker Bob Cupp and State Representative John Patterson decided that something had to be done. They immediately embarked upon an effort to comprehensively remake Ohio’s school funding system utilizing the experience and expertise of Ohio educators to craft its many provisions. Their instructions to the sixteen members of the Workgroup were simple: every provision must address a verifiable need, be based upon objective criteria, and reflect acknowledged research, established best practices, their own personal professional experience, and be based on Ohio data.”

In 2021, the two primary sponsors of the bill, Rep. Jamie Callender and Rep. Bride Rose Sweeney testified before the House Finance Committee during a hearing on the bill.

== Support, opposition, and concerns ==
Over the course of three years, school district representatives approached legislators with feedback on the state’s school funding formulas, which had been referred to by Rep. Callender as “years of patchwork state spending.” The Ohio Federation of Teachers, the state’s teachers' union, supports HB 1. The union’s support for the state constitutional mandate of fair fully funded local schools is one reason they support the bill.

One of the more contentious sections of the bill is relative to charter schools. Under the bill, the state would make direct payments for students’ use of the EdChoice private school voucher program. Under current law, deductions are taken from the public school district where the student receiving the voucher resides. Some charter school advocates have expressed concern with the legislation, saying it is unfair to charter schools.

The Buckeye Institute, a conservative Ohio think tank, expressed some concern on the cost of the bill, saying that overhaul will end up costing more than legislators think, under the reasoning that the bill uses teacher salaries from two years ago as its basis for the spending amounts, which distorts costs.

== See also ==
- Education in the United States
- No Child Left Behind Act
- Ohio Department of Education
