= Sean O'Brien (politician) =

American politician

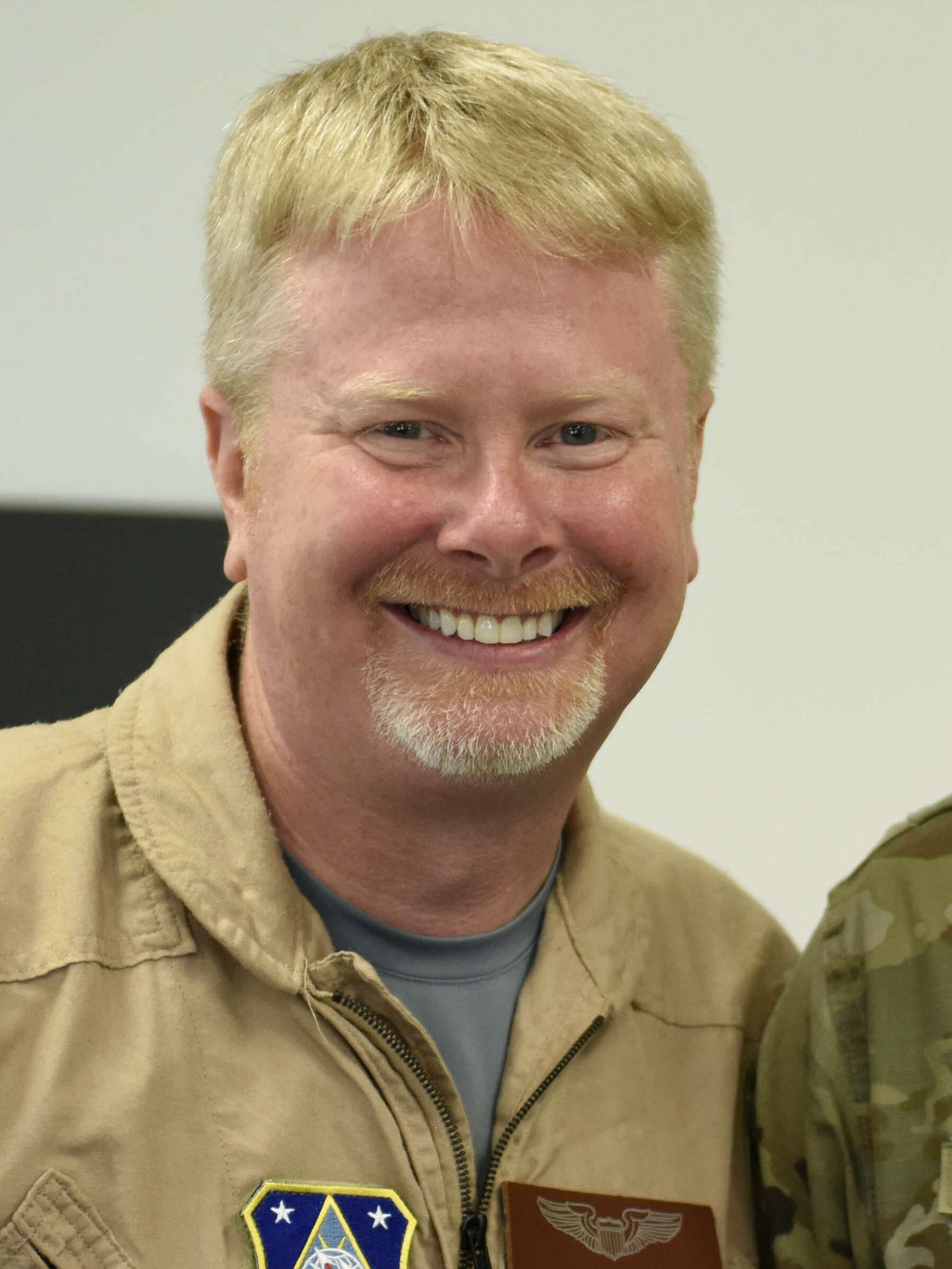

Judge of the Trumbull County Court of Common Pleas
- In office January 1, 2023 – present
- Preceded by: W. Wyatt McKay

Member of the Ohio Senate from the 32nd district
- In office January 3, 2017 – December 31, 2020
- Preceded by: Capri Cafaro
- Succeeded by: Sandra O'Brien

Member of the Ohio House of Representatives from the 63rd district
- In office January 3, 2011 – December 31, 2016
- Preceded by: Sandra Harwood
- Succeeded by: Glenn Holmes

Personal details
- Born: August 19, 1968 (age 58)
- Party: Democratic
- Spouse: Maria O'Brien
- Children: 2
- Education: Edinboro University (B.S.); University of Akron (J.D.)
- Profession: Lawyer

Sean O'Brien (born August 19, 1968) is a judge of the Trumbull County Court of Common Pleas in Ohio. He is a former Democratic member of the Ohio Senate who represented the 32nd district. The district includes all of Ashtabula and Trumbull counties, as well as a portion of Geauga County (including the City of Chardon, but excluding Chardon Township). O'Brien formerly served in the Ohio House of Representatives from 2011 to 2016.

== Life and career ==
A lifelong resident of the Mahoning Valley, O'Brien graduated from Edinboro University before earning his Juris Doctor (J.D.) degree from the University of Akron.

He founded the Trumbull County Community Foundation, an economic development not-for-profit.

He is married with two daughters.

O'Brien was elected to the Ohio House of Representatives in November 2010 with 64.53% of the vote, defeating Republican Geno Capone and Independent Werner Lange. He won reelection in 2012, garnering 72.46% of the vote, and again in 2014 with 66%. Prior to his election, he served as assistant prosecutor in Trumbull County.

== Ohio Senate ==
In 2016, ten-year incumbent Capri Cafaro was ineligible to run for re-election to the Ohio Senate due to term limits. O'Brien made it known fairly early that he intended to succeed her. While initially he faced competition for the nomination from Tom Letson, Letson eventually dropped out. In the primary, O'Brien faced political newcomer Kristen Rock, but defeated her easily, 62% to 38%, to take the nomination.

While Donald Trump won the district in 2016, O'Brien easily defeated Republican Robert Allen, 56% to 44%, to take the seat in the general election. He was sworn in on January 3, 2017.

On November 3, 2020, O'Brien lost re-election to former Ashtabula County Auditor Sandra O'Brien.

=== Committee assignments ===
- Senate Committee on Agriculture (ranking minority member)
- Senate Committee on Energy and Natural Resources (ranking minority member)
- Senate Committee on Insurance and Financial Institutions
- Senate Committee on Judiciary
- Senate Committee on Local Government, Public Safety and Veteran's Affairs
- Senate Committee on Public Utilities
- Senate Committee on Ways and Means
- Senate Committee on Finance Subcommittee on General Government and Agency Review (vice chair)
