= Don Manning (politician) =

American politician (1967–2020)

Member of the Ohio House of Representatives from the 59th district
- In office January 6, 2019 – March 20, 2020
- Preceded by: John Boccieri
- Succeeded by: Alessandro Cutrona

Personal details
- Born: May 28, 1967 Sherman, Texas, U.S.
- Died: March 20, 2020 (aged 52) Youngstown, Ohio
- Party: Republican

Military service
- Allegiance: United States
- Branch/service: United States Navy

Donald E. Manning II (May 28, 1967 – March 20, 2020) was an American politician who served as a member of the Ohio House of Representatives, representing the 59th district from 2019 to 2020.

== Career ==
A Republican, Manning's district included suburban Youngstown as well as rural Mahoning County. Manning previously served in the United States Navy aboard the aircraft carrier USS Forrestal. He had also worked in the criminal justice system and served on the New Middletown Village council, and was active with youth service.

Manning previously ran in 2016, losing to incumbent John Boccieri. In 2018, Boccieri ran for the Ohio Senate, and Manning ran for his vacant seat in the House of Representatives. Manning defeated Democrat Eric Ungaro, 50.35% to 49.65%.

As a candidate, Manning was interviewed by Ohio Advocates for Medical Freedom, expressing his strong support of their views that vaccinations should not be mandated by any government entity, saying that "any time we have an opportunity to keep the Government out of our lives, I'm on board." Manning received the group's Verified Candidate designation for his views.

Two months after taking office as State Representative, Manning introduced legislation (House Bill 132) that would require school officials to provide the legal exemptions as well as the state-mandated vaccination requirements.

== Death ==
Manning died suddenly on March 20, 2020, after being taken to a Youngstown hospital for chest pains.
