= Mark Schneider (politician) =

American politician

Mark A. Schneider

Member of the Ohio House of Representatives from the 63rd district
- In office January 5, 2009 – January 2011
- Preceded by: Carol-Ann Schindel
- Succeeded by: Ron Young

Personal details
- Party: Democratic
- Education: University of Michigan (BS); Ohio State University (JD)
- Profession: Attorney

Mark A. Schneider is an American attorney and politician who served as a member of the Ohio House of Representatives from 2009 to 2011.

== Education ==
Schneider earned a Bachelor of Science degree in finance and accounting from the University of Michigan and a Juris Doctor from the Ohio State University Moritz College of Law.

== Career ==
A former Cuyahoga County assistant prosecutor, Schneider was a candidate for the Ohio House of Representatives and defeated incumbent Carol-Ann Schindel.

Schneider was sworn into his seat on January 5, 2009, beginning his two year term. Schneider faced former Representative Ron Young in the 2010 election. Young defeated Schneider.
