= Lorraine Fende =

American politician (born 1956)

Member of the Ohio House of Representatives from the 62nd district
- In office January 3, 2005-December 31, 2012
- Preceded by: Jamie Callender
- Succeeded by: John Rogers

Personal details
- Born: August 15, 1956 (age 70) Cleveland, Ohio
- Party: Democratic
- Education: Lakeland Community College, Ohio University
- Profession: Community Development

Lorraine Fende (born August 15, 1956) is an American politician who served as County Treasurer for Lake County, Ohio. Previously she was a Democratic member of the Ohio House of Representatives for the 62nd District.

Fende served as a councilwoman and mayor in Willowick, Ohio. She was first elected to the House of Representatives in 2004 when she won the seat of Republican Jamie Callender who was restricted by a term limit, by 53.4% to 46.6%. She was re-elected in 2006, 2008 and 2010. Fende has served as the chair of the Ohio House Democratic Women’s Caucus.

In 2011 she introduced a bill which would ban late-term abortions in the state.
