= Joe Schiavoni =

American politician

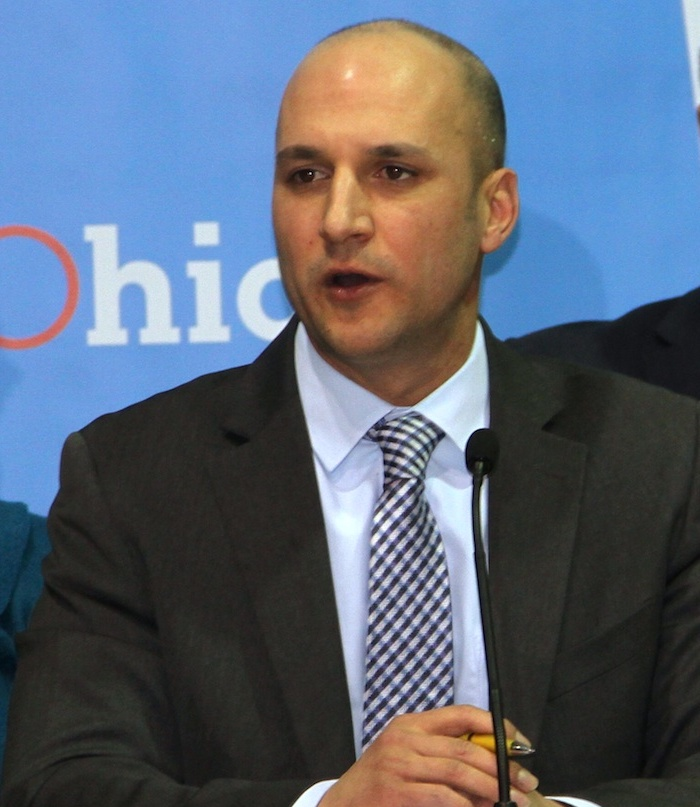

Judge of the Mahoning County Court
- Incumbent
- Assumed office November 25, 2020
- Preceded by: JP Morgan

Minority Leader of the Ohio Senate
- In office January 14, 2014 – April 26, 2017
- Preceded by: Eric Kearney
- Succeeded by: Kenny Yuko

Member of the Ohio Senate from the 33rd district
- In office January 6, 2009 – December 31, 2018
- Preceded by: John Boccieri
- Succeeded by: Michael Rulli

Personal details
- Born: September 21, 1979 (age 47) Columbus, Ohio, U.S.
- Party: Democratic
- Education: Ohio University (BS); Capital University (JD)

Joseph L. Schiavoni (born September 21, 1979) is an American politician and judge who served as a member of the Ohio Senate and Ohio Senate Minority Leader. A member of the Democratic Party, Schiavoni was elected in 2020 to serve as a Judge in the Mahoning County, Ohio Court System.

== Early life ==
Schiavoni was born in Columbus, Ohio, and grew up on the south side of Youngstown, Ohio. He later moved to the suburb of Boardman, Ohio, where he attended Boardman High School. He has three younger brothers. While in high school, Schiavoni was a Golden Gloves boxer, as were his three brothers and his father before them. As a young man, he held jobs at Catullo Prime Meats, Fab-Art Steel, and Keffler Construction in the Mahoning Valley.

Following high school, Schiavoni attended Ohio University, where he graduated with a Bachelor of Science in Communications. He then attended law school at Capital University, and received his Juris Doctor in 2004.

After graduating from law school, Schiavoni returned to Youngstown, where he became a member of his family's law firm. Since then, he has practiced worker's compensation law. Schiavoni is licensed to practice law in both Ohio and West Virginia. Schiavoni at one time helped legally represent Kelly Pavlik, the Middleweight Boxing Champion of the World, with whom he boxed as a child on the south side of Youngstown.

Schiavoni has long been an active member of Big Brothers, Big Sisters of Mahoning Valley. He earned the "Big Brother of the Year" award in 2007. Through this organization, Schiavoni later joined the Youngstown State University Senior Youth Mentorship steering committee.

== Career ==
=== Ohio Senate ===
As a political novice, Schiavoni was selected in 2008 to replace Senator John Boccieri, who had been elected to the United States House of Representatives. His selection surprised many, as Schiavoni was only 28 years old at the time and had never held elected office. Nonetheless, Schiavoni easily won the party nomination in 2010 and was elected in the general election by a 17.2% margin.

In November 2011, Schiavoni was named Assistant Minority Whip in the Senate, but quickly rose to Assistant Minority Leader under Eric Kearney in January 2012. Schiavoni would serve in that capacity for two years until 2014, when he was unanimously elected by his colleagues to be Minority Leader.

He was unopposed for re-election in 2014 to hold his seat in the Senate. Due to term limits, Schiavoni could not run for reelection in 2018.

==== Issues and legislation ====
===== Education =====
While in the Senate, Schiavoni has been an outspoken advocate for public education and charter school reform. He has penned legislation to create stronger charter school oversight.

In October 2014, Schiavoni proposed a grant program to help Ohio schools create bullying prevention programs. In February 2015, he reintroduced the bullying prevention grant program, along with legislation that would provide additional funding for school safety initiatives.

Schiavoni has been a vocal opponent of the controversial Ohio law that gives an unelected CEO "complete operational, managerial and instructional control" of failing Ohio school districts. Schiavoni and Representative Michele Lepore-Hagan held town hall meetings in Youngstown to seek resident input on the new law. The two legislators then introduced companion legislation in the House and Senate to adjust the law according to recommendations made by local educators and families.

He and other top Democratic lawmakers also called for the removal of State Superintendent Richard Ross. "citing the recent scandal involving the cover up of failing charter school grades in state evaluations, the plan to take over the Youngstown public schools crafted behind closed doors, and general lack of accountability to the State Board of Education and the public." Ross eventually resigned.

Schiavoni requested a special audit of the Ohio Department of Education after it was discovered that failing online charter school data had been omitted to make Ohio charter schools appear more successful overall.

In early 2016, state audits found that at least three online charter schools (e-schools), which are paid per full time student, had been significantly overpaid due to inaccurate recording and reporting of student attendance. In response, Senator Schiavoni and the Senate Democratic Caucus called for increased scrutiny for e-schools. Schiavoni introduced a bill - Senate Bill 298 - to reform attendance data collection and reporting rules for e-schools. Among other provisions, Senate Bill 298 would require e-schools to keep complete and accurate records of the times when each student participated in online coursework. That data would be reported to the state each month. If a student failed to log into their classes for 10 consecutive days, the bill would require the child's e-school to alert the state and the student's parents/guardians.

===== Protections for children =====
In 2015, Schiavoni sponsored legislation that would make improper child restraints in vehicles a primary offense, meaning officers would not need another reason to pull the vehicle over. This legislation was at least partially motivated by a head-on crash in the Minerva, Ohio, area that killed three people, including an 11-year-old girl who had been riding in the vehicle's cargo area.

In June 2015, Schiavoni and Senator Lou Gentile (D-Steubenville) introduced legislation to strengthen penalties for people found guilty of purposefully harming children under age 13.

===== Collective bargaining =====
Schiavoni has championed collective bargaining rights for workers, and has actively opposed attempts to weaken these rights.

In 2011, Schiavoni helped lead his fellow Democratic senators in opposition to Senate Bill 5, a controversial piece of legislation that would have eliminated collective bargaining powers for many public employees and changed collective bargaining rules for local government employees. The bill also included provisions affecting contracts and rules for teachers, police officers, and firefighters. Schiavoni was ranking minority member on the Insurance, Labor and Commerce Committee - where the bill had its hearings - during this time.

After Senate Bill 5 was signed into law, Ohio citizens collected signatures and placed a referendum on the November ballot (State Issue 2). Schiavoni helped rally voters to repeal Senate Bill 5 at the ballot. Issue 2 - which would repeal SB 5 - was passed by the voters in November 2011. It passed by a margin of 61% - 39%, dealing a victory to unions and a blow to the administration of Ohio Governor John Kasich.

===== Fast track trade agreements =====
Schiavoni is opposed to fast track trade agreements and has urged the US Congress "to oppose fast track legislation on trade agreements such as the Trans-Pacific Partnership."

"Communities throughout the Ohio Valley have been devastated by previous fast track trade agreements, and we can't allow that to happen again. We need fair trade deals that grow our economy and stop good paying jobs from leaving our shores."

===== Water quality =====
Schiavoni has made water quality issues a priority during his time at the Ohio Statehouse. In 2015, he introduced a bipartisan resolution to address water quality issues statewide. The resolution would allow the use of state bonds to help fund local sewer and water improvement projects. The Dayton City Commission later passed a resolution in support of Schiavoni's legislation.

In January 2016, it was discovered that residents of Sebring, Ohio, had not been properly notified of high lead levels in their drinking water. Senator Schiavoni and Rep. John Boccieri sent multiple letters to the Ohio EPA, asking for additional information. Schiavoni then introduced legislation requiring faster public notification of hazardous drinking water. Several of Schiavoni's proposals were later incorporated into Governor Kasich's plan to address the Sebring water crisis.

===== Additional legislation =====
Schiavoni proposed legislation to require Ohio's governor to get approval from a state commission before closing or selling state-operated institutions such as prisons or centers for individuals with developmental disabilities. The proposed state commission would include "lawmakers, officials of the agency in charge of the institution, others who have worked with the agency, a union member, and members of the public."

=== Campaign for governor and service as judge ===
Schiavoni announced his run for Governor of Ohio in the 2018 election on February 28, 2017. He lost the primary race for governor on May 3, 2018.

In 2019 Schiavoni announced that he would run to be a Judge of the Mahoning County Court against JP Morgan. Morgan was appointed by Governor DeWine to fill a vacated seat. Schiavoni won 58%–42% in a November 3, 2020, election and will serve out the remainder of the term, presiding over the Sebring Court.

== Family and personal life ==
Schiavoni is a member of Big Brothers and Big Sisters of the Mahoning Valley, Curbstone Coaches, the local Farm Bureau, Boardman Civic Association, Italian-American Education Foundation, and the Legends of Leather Boxing Organization. He is also a member of the Ohio State Bar Association and the Mahoning County Bar Association. He has served as Co-Chair of the Public Relations Committee for the Mahoning County Bar Association.

Schiavoni is married to Margaret Schiavoni, a nurse-anesthetist, and they have two children together. They reside in Boardman, Ohio.

== Electoral history ==
Ohio Senate 33rd District: Results 2010 to 2014
Year	Democrat	Votes	Pct	Republican	Votes	Pct	Libertarian	Votes	Pct
2010	Joe Schiavoni	63,771	60.05%	Matt Lewis	37,756	36.49%	John Fockler	3,677	3.46%
2014	Joe Schiavoni	63,972	100.00%						
