= Sharon Ray =

American politician

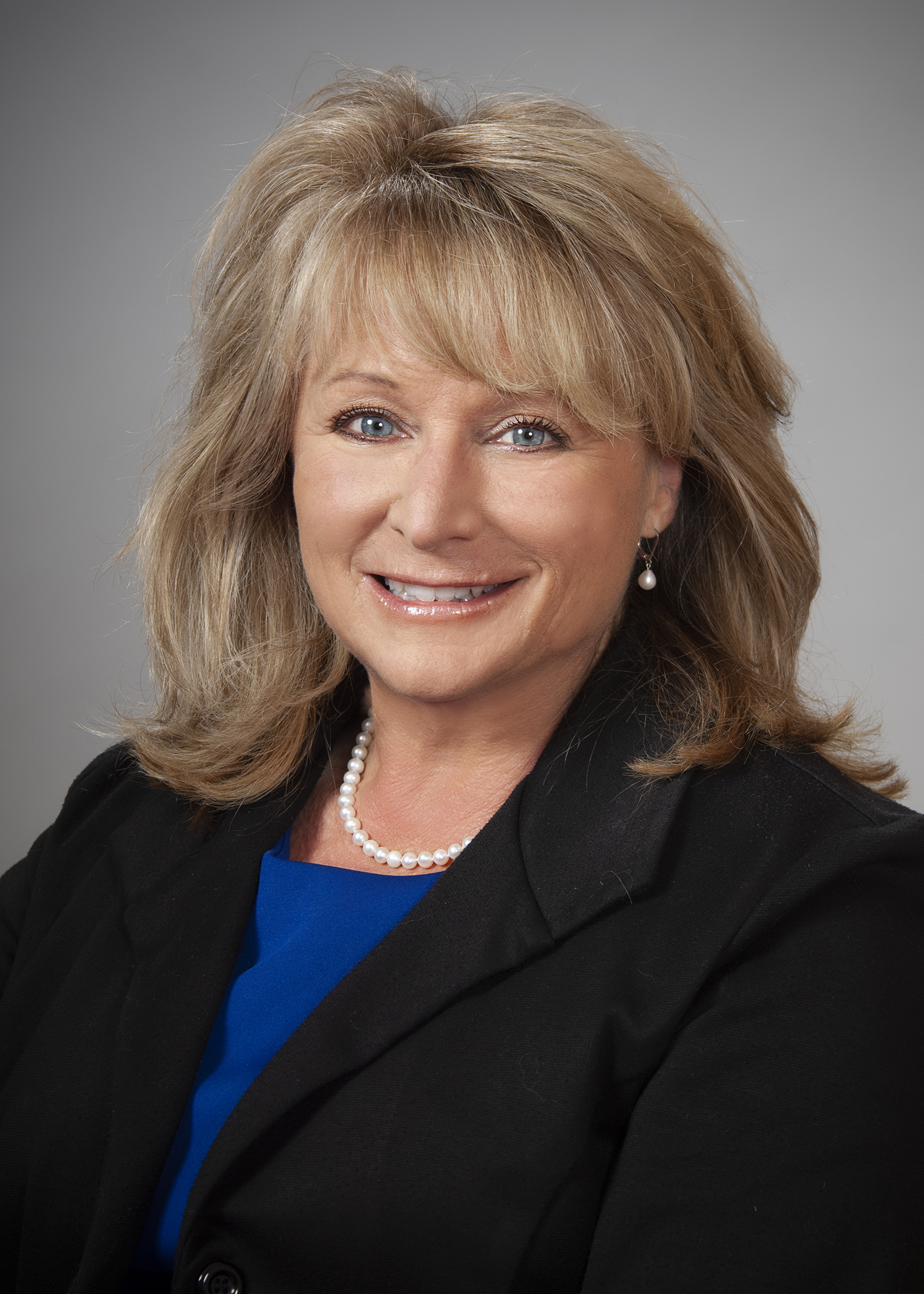

Member of the Ohio House of Representatives
- In office January 3, 2023 – September 14, 2026
- Preceded by: Adam Bird
- Succeeded by: Sean Hutson
- Constituency: 66th district
- In office January 4, 2021 – December 31, 2022
- Preceded by: Steve Hambley
- Succeeded by: Kevin D. Miller
- Constituency: 69th district

Personal details
- Party: Republican

Sharon A. Ray is an American politician who served as a member of the Ohio House of Representatives from the 66th district from 2023 to 2026, having previously served from the 69th district from 2021 to 2022. She won the seat after incumbent Republican Steve Hambley decided to run for the Medina County Board of Commissioners. She defeated Democrat Donna Beheydt in 2020, winning 64.8% to 35.2%.

Ray served as chair of the General Government Committee, and served on the Children & Human Services, Energy, and Finance Committees.

Ray resigned from the Ohio House of Representatives in September 2026 after being appointed as the Medina County recorder.
