= Mark Okey =

American politician

Member of the Ohio House of Representatives from the 61st district
- Preceded by: John Boccieri
- Succeeded by: Ron Hood

Personal details
- Party: Democratic
- Spouse: Kathy
- Education: Kent State University; Ohio Northern University Pettit College of Law
- Profession: Attorney

Mark Okey is a former Democratic member of the Ohio House of Representatives for the 61st district. He first took office in 2007, and was re-elected in 2008 and 2010. He opted not to run for a 3rd term in 2012.

Okey has a history degree from Kent State University and a law degree from Ohio Northern University, and is married with three children. He also works as an attorney in a legal practice founded by his father.
