= Alessandro Cutrona =

American politician and attorney

Al Cutrona

Member of the Ohio Senate from the 33rd district
- Incumbent
- Assumed office June 26, 2024
- Preceded by: Michael Rulli

Member of the Ohio House of Representatives from the 58th district
- In office May 28, 2020 – June 26, 2024
- Preceded by: Don Manning
- Succeeded by: Tex Fischer

Personal details
- Born: Alessandro Cutrona
- Party: Republican
- Education: Youngstown State University (BA); Case Western Reserve University (JD)

Al Cutrona is an American politician and attorney who has served in the Ohio Senate since 2024. A member of the Republican Party, he represents the 33rd district, which includes Mahoning, Columbiana, and Carroll counties. He previously served in the Ohio House of Representatives from 2020 to 2024.

== Early life and education ==
Cutrona was born and raised in the Mahoning Valley. He graduated from Canfield High School in 2008. He earned a Bachelor of Arts degree in political science and history from Youngstown State University, followed by a Juris Doctor from the Case Western Reserve University School of Law.

== Career ==
An attorney by trade, Cutrona was appointed to the Ohio House of Representatives on May 28, 2020, succeeding Don Manning, who had died in March of that year. In July 2020, Cutrona voted against removing Larry Householder as Speaker of the House, who had been federally indicted and later convicted in connection with the Ohio nuclear bribery scandal tied to House Bill 6. The Ohio House voted 75–21 to expel Householder, with Cutrona among the 21 Republican members who opposed the resolution. Cutrona cited due process and a lack of a criminal conviction (at the time) as his reasoning for not voting to expel Householder.

In the November 2020 general election, Cutrona successfully kept his seat, defeating Democratic challenger Chris Stanley 61% to 39%. Cutrona won re-election in 2022, defeating Democratic challenger Bruce Neff 57% to 43%.

On June 26, 2024, Cutrona was appointed to the Ohio Senate as senator for the 33rd District following the election of then-state senator Michael Rulli to the U.S. House of Representatives in Ohio's 2024 6th Congressional District special election. In November 2024, Cutrona won the election for the remainder of Rulli's unexpired term to the Ohio Senate, defeating attorney Marty Hume 60.9% to 39.1%.

== Personal life ==
Cutrona lives in Canfield, Ohio.
