= Gil Blair =

American politician

Member of the Ohio House of Representatives from the 63rd district
- In office June 5, 2019 – December 31, 2020
- Preceded by: Glenn Holmes
- Succeeded by: Mike Loychik

Personal details
- Born: July 11, 1970 (age 56) Warren, Ohio
- Party: Democratic
- Children: Meredith Blair, Gil Blair, Megan Blair
- Education: John F. Kennedy High School
- Alma mater: University of Akron (B.A., J.D.)

H. Gilson Blair (born July 11, 1970) is a former member of the Ohio House of Representatives, representing the 63rd district from 2019 through 2020. A Democrat, Blair's district includes approximately half of Trumbull County. Blair formerly was a candidate for the Niles municipal court judge and served as a Warren City prosecutor, as well as eight years as a Weathersfield Township trustee. He is a graduate of the University of Akron.

In 2019, state Representative Glenn Holmes stepped down from his seat to take a role in the administration of Ohio Governor Mike DeWine. Soon after Ohio House Democrats nominated Blair to serve out the remainder of Holmes' term. He was sworn into office on May 31, 2019.

== Links ==
- Representative Gil Blair (official site)
