= Kevin D. Miller =

American politician

Kevin Miller

Member of the Ohio House of Representatives from the 69th district
- Incumbent
- Assumed office January 3, 2023
- Preceded by: Sharon Ray

Member of the Ohio House of Representatives from the 72nd district
- In office June 25, 2021 – December 31, 2022
- Preceded by: Larry Householder
- Succeeded by: Gail Pavliga

Personal details
- Born: Ohio, United States
- Party: Republican
- Spouse: Megan
- Children: 2
- Education: Ohio State University (BS)
- Police career
- Branch: Ohio State Highway Patrol
- Rank: Commander

Kevin D. Miller (born c. 1975) is an American politician and law enforcement officer who was appointed to serve as a member of the Ohio House of Representatives from the 72nd district. Miller has previously worked as a commander with the Ohio State Highway Patrol.

== Education ==
Miller earned a Bachelor of Science degree from Ohio State University in 1997.

== Career ==
Miller has served as a member of the Ohio State Highway Patrol for 22 years, including as a commander, labor relations advocate, and trooper. He most recently served as the Highway Patrol's legislative liaison. On June 25, 2021, it was announced that Miller would replace former Speaker Larry Householder in the Ohio House of Representatives after Householder was expelled from the house on June 16, 2021.
