= Ohio Advocates for Medical Freedom =

American anti-vaccination group

- President: Stephanie Stock
- Website: ohioamf.org

Ohio Advocates for Medical Freedom (OAMF) is one of the main anti-vaccination organizations in Ohio. A non-profit group, it frequently lobbies politicians to favor legislative action designed to weaken Ohio's vaccination coverage.

== Legislative work ==
OAMF intervenes to oppose legislative measures that promote vaccine coverage in the state or education about immunization, and to support those that make it easier for people to forego vaccination. The group testified in favor of a 2021 Ohio senate bill creating a bicameral committee to examine public health measures from Ohio Department of Health and the Governor before they are implemented. The legislation was opposed by Governor Mike DeWine and by several of the state's health authorities, arguing that it would impede their ability to react quickly to new information about the COVID-19 epidemic. During the 2018–2019 measles outbreaks in some regions of the United States, the group's president, Stephanie Stock, opposed restricting vaccination exemptions, insisting "the biggest percentage complication with measles is diarrhea". The disease ranks among the most contagious and it kills one or two children out of 1,000 affected. Arguments against vaccination are contradicted by overwhelming scientific consensus about the safety and effectiveness of vaccines.

OAMF is the driving force behind attempts to put anti-vaccination language into Ohio's constitution. In June 2022, the Ohio Ballot Board approved the wording of a constitutional amendment that would, if adopted, prevent public and private institutions from requiring vaccinations as a condition of employment or other reasons. If the measure, called "Medical Right to Refuse", is supported by a petition of at least 443,000 Ohio Ohioans, it will be included on the ballot as a referendum in an upcoming statewide election.

OAMF's Facebook page served as the main fundraising instrument for a lawsuit asking the court to rescind the measures taken by the State to prevent the spread of COVID-19, such as mask-wearing. The lawsuit, filed in November by a group called Ohio Stand Up, repeats the usual misinformation associated with the pandemic, including that the number of deaths have been inflated by public health authorities.

== Public outreach activities ==
Like other similar groups, OAMF objects to being labelled "anti-vaccine", preferring the euphemism "medical freedom". The group has campaigned to weaken school immunization requirements, and opposed the obligation for hospital employees to get vaccinated against the flu.

In 2017, their members planned to distribute anti-vaccination messages printed on cards with Halloween candy, raising objections from the Ohio Chapter of the American Academy of Pediatrics.

YouTube pulled some of their videos in February 2021 as part of the social media platform's efforts to curb the dissemination of misinformation related to COVID-19, but the group's account remained active.
