= Bob Hagan =

American politician

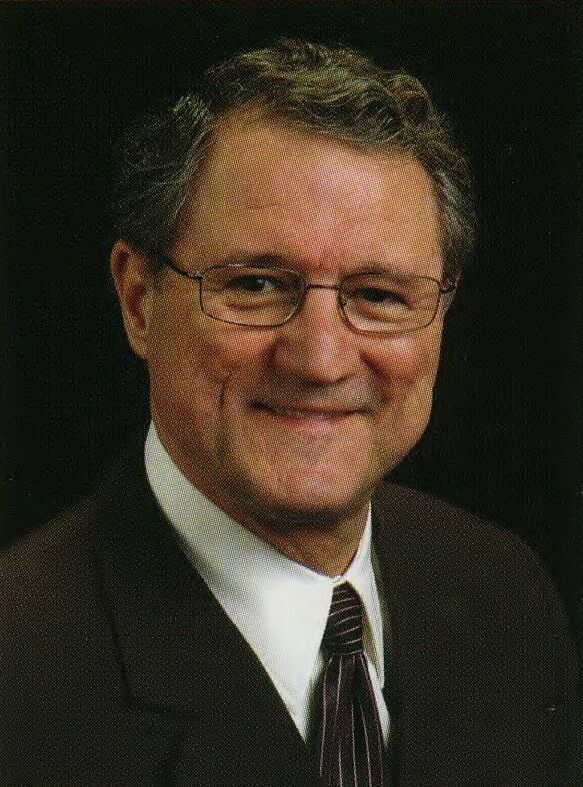

Member of the Ohio House of Representatives from the 58th district
- In office January 2, 2007 – December 31, 2014
- Preceded by: Sylvester Patton
- Succeeded by: Michele Lepore-Hagan
- In office January 2, 1987 – February 8, 1997
- Preceded by: Tom Gilmartin
- Succeeded by: Sylvester Patton

Member of the Ohio Senate from the 33rd district
- In office February 8, 1997 – December 31, 2006
- Preceded by: Joseph Vukovich
- Succeeded by: John Boccieri

Personal details
- Born: March 31, 1949 (age 77) Youngstown, Ohio, U.S.
- Party: Democratic
- Spouse: Michele Lepore-Hagan
- Education: Ursuline High School
- Profession: Locomotive Engineer

Robert F. Hagan (born March 31, 1949) is an American politician and member of the Democratic Party who held a seat in the Ohio House of Representatives for the 58th District from 2007 to 2014. He represented the same seat from 1987 to 1997, and served in the Ohio Senate from 1997 to 2006.

In 2014, he began work for the Brotherhood of Locomotive Engineers and Trainmen governmental affairs team.

== Early life, family and education ==
Hagan was born and raised in Youngstown, Ohio. He attended Ursuline High School. His father, Robert E. Hagan, was also involved in politics. His brother, Tim Hagan, served for many years as a county commissioner in Cuyahoga County, Ohio and was the 2002 Democratic nominee for Governor of Ohio.

Before entering electoral politics, Hagan worked for 15 years as a locomotive engineer for CSX Transportation.

== Career ==
=== First Ohio House of Representatives sitting ===
In 1986, he was elected to a seat in the Ohio House of Representatives, representing the 53rd Ohio House district, centered on Youngstown, Ohio. At the time, his father, Robert E. Hagan, was also serving in the House. Between 1986 and 1990, the Hagans were the first father and son to simultaneously hold seats in the Ohio House of Representatives. Hagan served in the House for ten years.

=== Ohio Senate ===
When incumbent Joseph Vukovich was appointed to a judiciary position in 1997, Hagan was chosen to succeed him in the Ohio Senate. He was appointed to the State Senate on February 12, 1997, to represent the 33rd district in northeastern Ohio, centered on the city of Youngstown. During his time in there, he was chosen by the Senate Democratic caucus to serve as assistant minority whip in the 126th Ohio General Assembly; however, he stepped down from his leadership post when he entered the election for State Representative.

In 2005, Hagan ran for mayor of Youngstown, hoping to replace outgoing mayor George McKelvey. Although initially favored to win, he was soundly defeated by independent candidate Jay Williams. A strong proponent of progressive policies, Hagan occasionally uses satire to attempt to make a point. In February 2006, he placed a spoof request for co-sponsors for a fictional piece of legislation called the "Republican Adoption Ban of 2006." The bill was meant as a response to HB 515, which was a ban on adoption by homosexual or bisexual people or couples, and in presenting the fake legislation Hagan cited so-called "credible research" indicating that children in Republican households had a host of emotional problems.

In April 2010, Bob Hagan co-sponsored a measure to legalize marijuana in Ohio.

=== Second Ohio House of Representatives sitting ===
Unsuccessful in his bid for Mayor of Youngstown, Hagan sought to return to Ohio House of Representatives to succeed term limited Sylvester "Sly" Patton. Against six others for the nomination, Hagan won the primary with 37.59% of the vote. He won the general election with 58.08% of the vote against Republican John Johnson. Hagan, in 2008, won reelection with 84.9% of the vote again Republican Timothy Gordon.

Facing primary opposition for a third term in 2010, Hagan defeated Don Hanni with 70.59% of the vote for the nomination. He won the general election with 81.23% of the vote over Republican Daniel Thimons. For the 129th General Assembly, Hagan served on the committees of Commerce and Labor; Health and Aging; and Transportation, Public Safety and Homeland Security. He also served on the Midwest Interstate Passenger Rail Commission.

Hagan won a final term in 2012 unopposed, and was term-limited in 2014. He was succeeded by his wife Michele Lepore-Hagan.

== 2016 U.S. Senate election ==
On April 17, 2013, Hagan announced his candidacy for the United States Senate seat currently occupied by Republican Rob Portman. He cited Portman's vote against background checks as his motive for challenging the freshman senator.

== Policies and initiatives ==
=== Collective bargaining ===
With the city of Youngstown being majorly pro-labor, Hagan had been against a bill that looks to limit collective bargaining for public employees. While it was virtually inevitable that the bill will pass into law, Hagan vowed to lead an effort to overthrow it via a referendum. A member of the committee hearing the bill, Hagan presented his colleagues with 65,000 petitions from individuals opposing the bill, which were ordered removed from the room by chairman Joe Uecker. Hagan has cited a considerable amount of secrecy and partisanship surrounding the legislation. He has called the bill simply a bust to unions. The bill ultimately passed the entire legislature.

=== Governor recall ===
Building off his opposition to S.B. 5, Hagan introduced legislation with Michael Foley that would allow voters to recall the governor, other statewide officeholders and members of the General Assembly. They stated that the measure was initiated by John Kasich's low approval ratings and the outcry that occurred after S.B. 5.

=== Environmental issues ===
A staunch liberal, Hagan is against measures that would allow drilling for oil and natural gas in Ohio state parks. In debate on the bill, which went on to pass the Ohio House of Representatives, he went on to question whether Republicans who supported the measure were on drugs. Hagan has also sought to fight gasoline prices through legislation to create the Ohio Gasoline Price Oversight Commission. Along with Ron Gerberry, Hagan hopes to help fight rising gasoline prices. "This legislation is a direct response to the sacrifice our constituents are making at the pumps," Rep. Hagan said.

=== Other ===
On October 22, 2012, Hagan introduced a bill in the Ohio House that would prohibit any team playing in publicly financed stadiums or arenas from blacking out games. A violation would result in the team repaying its public funding.

== Controversies ==
In 2010, Hagan was assaulted at the Lemon Grove, a bar located in Youngstown, Ohio. He was punched in the face after a verbal altercation with a fellow customer, and was treated with several stitches at a local hospital after regaining consciousness.

On January 20, 2011 it was reported that Hagan had referred to someone during an online debate on Facebook as a "buckwheat", a word that some consider to have racist connotations. It was not directed at Thomas. Hagan said "buckwheat" was a term he had been using "since he was a kid" and that it no longer carried racial connotation for him.

On April 27, 2012, Hagan was uninvited to speak at the graduation ceremony of Mercy College School of Nursing at the request of Bishop George Murry, S.J. of Youngstown, just four days before the graduation was to take place. Bishop Murry cited stance on abortion as the reasons for his decision.

On April 21, 2022, Hagan stated on Twitter that he had a photo of Michael Rulli engaging in sexual relations with former President Donald Trump.

On April 28, 2022, Hagan used disparaging comments on the social media platform Twitter, including referring to them as "right-wing troglodytes." His tweet went on to claim that Republicans "jerk off to Mein Kampf"

On August 28, 2022, a Hagan for State Senate sign was found burnt in Youngstown's Wick Park neighborhood. In response, Hagan blamed "extremist cowards" for the act of vandalism, stating "This is emblematic of the violent anarchy of the Republican ruling class.". In response, his opponent, Senator Rulli, denied involvement, alleging the act was an "inside job" by the Hagan campaign and offered a $5,000 reward to anyone who could provide video evidence of who burnt the sign.

On September 15, 2022, Senator Rulli alleged that Hagan had entered his family's grocery store, Rulli Brothers, and harassed customers on September 12. Hagan denied these allegations, stating that the man in the security camera footage was not him and accused Rulli of "endangering [his] family" and "inciting violence" against him. On September 30, Hagan filed a cease-and-desist order to remove the video from social media and provided evidence that he was at home during the alleged incident.
