= John Boccieri =

American politician (born 1969)

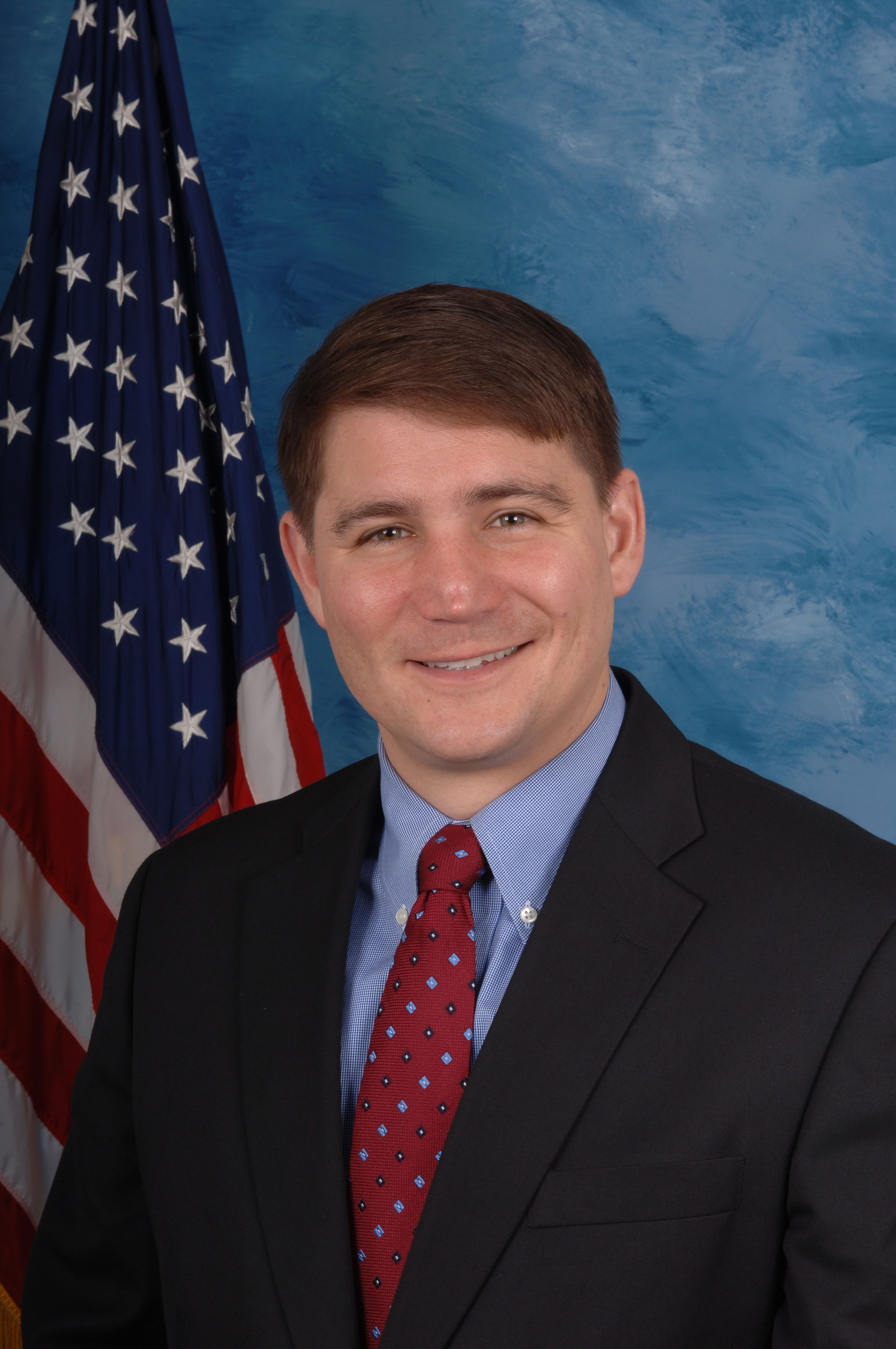
- Official portrait, 2008

Member-elect of the Ohio House of Representatives from the 58th district
- Assuming office January 1, 2027
- Succeeding: Lauren McNally

Member of the Ohio House of Representatives from the 59th district
- In office September 29, 2015 – December 31, 2018
- Preceded by: Ron Gerberry
- Succeeded by: Don Manning

Member of the U.S. House of Representatives from Ohio's 16th district
- In office January 3, 2009 – January 3, 2011
- Preceded by: Ralph Regula
- Succeeded by: Jim Renacci

Member of the Ohio Senate from the 33rd district
- In office January 1, 2007 – December 31, 2008
- Preceded by: Bob Hagan
- Succeeded by: Joe Schiavoni

Member of the Ohio House of Representatives from the 61st district
- In office January 3, 2001 – December 31, 2006
- Preceded by: Ron Hood
- Succeeded by: Mark Okey

Personal details
- Born: John Stephen Anthony Boccieri; October 5, 1969 (age 57) Youngstown, Ohio, U.S.
- Party: Democratic
- Spouse: Stacey Kennedy
- Education: St. Bonaventure University (BS); Webster University (MA, MPA)

Military service
- Branch/service: United States Air Force
- Years of service: 1994–1998 (active); 1998–present (reserve)
- Rank: Colonel
- Unit: 911th Airlift Wing
- Battles/wars: Operation Iraqi Freedom

John Stephen Anthony Boccieri (born October 5, 1969) is an American aviator, military veteran, and politician. A member of the Democratic Party, he represented the 59th district in the Ohio House of Representatives from 2015 to 2018. Boccieri previously served as the U.S. representative for Ohio's 16th congressional district from 2009 to 2011, as an Ohio state senator from 2007 to 2008, and as an Ohio state representative from 2001 to 2006.

== Early life and career ==
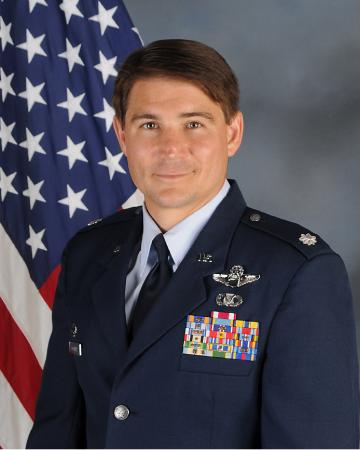
Boccieri in U.S. Air Force uniform

Boccieri was born in Youngstown, Ohio, where he graduated from Ursuline High School in 1988. He attended St. Bonaventure University, graduating with a B.S. in 1992, after which he played minor league baseball in the Frontier League.

Following one season of baseball, he began his career in government. After working as staff for several members of the Ohio House of Representatives, Boccieri joined the United States Air Force as a second lieutenant. He also earned two master's degrees (M.A. 1992, M.P.A. 1996) from Webster University. Boccieri flew the C-130 Hercules as a member of the Air Force Reserve. He has been forward deployed several times and served in Operation Enduring Freedom and Operation Iraqi Freedom, causing him to take leaves of absence from the Ohio Legislature.

After leaving the active duty Air Force, he re-entered politics, running for and winning the 61st District of the Ohio House of Representatives in 2000. In 2006, he won a seat in the Ohio State Senate in District 33; he was unopposed.

== United States Congress ==
=== Committee assignments ===
- Committee on Agriculture
  - Subcommittee on Conservation, Credit, Energy, and Research
- Committee on Transportation and Infrastructure
  - Subcommittee on Aviation
  - Subcommittee on Highways and Transit

=== Notable votes ===
In the 111th Congress, Boccieri voted for the Children's Health Insurance Program Reauthorization Act of 2009, the American Recovery and Reinvestment Act, an economic stimulus package, and the Patient Protection and Affordable Care Act, landmark health care reform legislation.

In his memoir, A Promised Land, Barack Obama described Boccieri as a "rising star" of the Democratic Party and one of the political neophytes who decided to support the healthcare reform bill despite political risks.

=== Campaigns ===
==== 2008 ====
There had been speculation throughout 2007 that Boccieri would challenge U.S. Representative Ralph Regula to represent the 16th District in the U.S. House, a seat Regula had held for 36 years. When Regula announced his retirement in late 2007, Boccieri faced an open field. He defeated State Representative Mary Cirelli with 64% of the vote in the Democratic primary. He faced and defeated State Senator Kirk Schuring in the general election. He was the first Democrat to represent this district in 58 years.

==== 2010 ====
On October 30, 2010, Boccieri ran offstage while former President Bill Clinton was giving a speech after learning that his pregnant wife was in labor.

On November 2, 2010, Boccieri lost his bid for a second term in Congress after being defeated by Republican businessman Jim Renacci. He was defeated handily in an overwhelmingly Republican election cycle; Boccieri received only 41% of the vote, compared to 52% for Renacci (a Libertarian candidate took the remaining votes).

== Return to Ohio House of Representatives and private sector ==
On September 29, 2015, Boccieri was appointed to the Ohio House of Representatives, filling the 59th District vacancy caused by the resignation of Ron Gerberry. He did not run for re-election in 2018, instead opting to run for the 33rd District seat in the Ohio State Senate, losing to Michael Rulli in the general election.

After leaving politics, Boccieri became a commercial airline pilot for United Airlines. He has also been active with the Airline Pilots Association and was considered for the role of administrator of the Federal Aviation Administration during the Biden administration, but ultimately was not appointed to the role.

In January 2026, Boccieri announced that he is running for the Ohio's 58th House of Representatives district. Boccieri is running to replace Democrat Lauren McNally.

Boccieri resides in Poland, Ohio.

U.S. House of Representatives
Preceded by Ralph Regula	Member of the U.S. House of Representatives from Ohio's 16th congressional district 2009–2011	Succeeded by Jim Renacci
U.S. order of precedence (ceremonial)
Preceded by David S. Mann as Former U.S. Representative	Order of precedence of the United States as Former US Representative	Succeeded by Steve Driehaus as Former U.S. Representative
