= Michael Rulli =

American politician (born 1969)

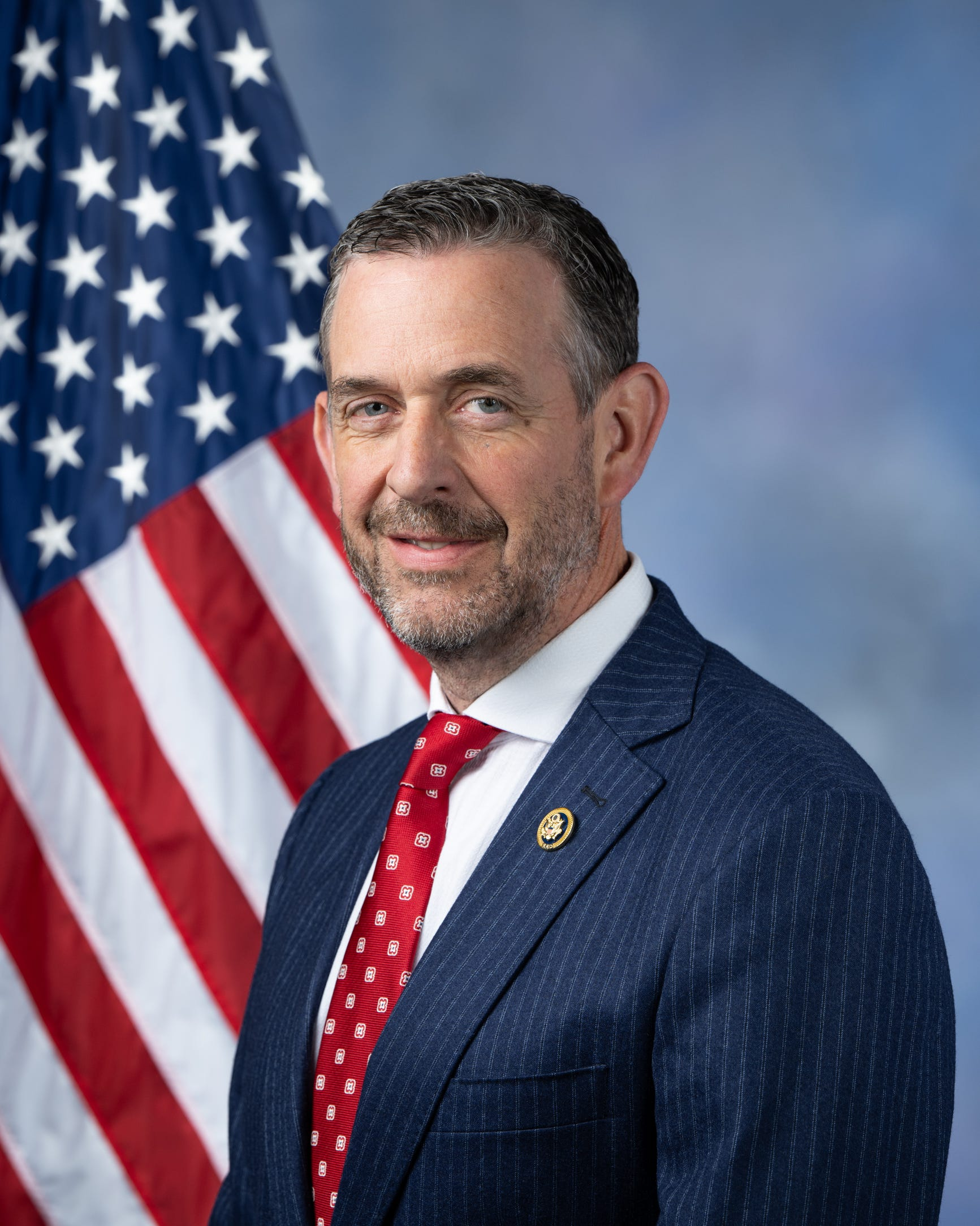
- Official portrait, 2024

Member of the U.S. House of Representatives from Ohio's 6th district
- Incumbent
- Assumed office June 11, 2024 (Note: Rulli's official service begins on the date of the special election, while he was not sworn in until June 25, 2024.)
- Preceded by: Bill Johnson

Member of the Ohio Senate from the 33rd district
- In office January 7, 2019 – June 12, 2024
- Preceded by: Joe Schiavoni
- Succeeded by: Alessandro Cutrona

Personal details
- Born: Michael Anthony Rulli; March 11, 1969 (age 57) Poland, Ohio, U.S.
- Party: Republican
- Spouses: Michelle Hinkle (m. 1992; div. 1997); Kelly Rulli (m. 2002)
- Children: 2
- Education: Emerson College (BA)
- Website: House website Campaign website

Michael Anthony Rulli (born March 11, 1969) is an American politician and businessman serving as the U.S. representative for Ohio's 6th congressional district since 2024. A member of the Republican Party, he previously served as an Ohio State Senator for the 33rd district from 2019 to 2024.

Rulli is the director of operations at Rulli Bros. Markets, a family-owned chain of grocery stores based in the Mahoning Valley region.

== Early life and education ==
Born on March 11, 1969, Rulli is a graduate of Poland Seminary High School and the United States Naval Sea Cadet Corps. He went on to earn bachelor's degrees in communications and speech from Emerson College in 1991. While studying in Boston, Rulli also interned for Joseph P. Kennedy II and played in the grunge band Red Bliss. After graduation, he joined his family's business, Rulli Bros. Markets. Rulli was a Democrat until the late 1990s, later joining the Republican Party.

== Ohio Senate (2019–2024) ==
Rulli was first elected to the Ohio Senate in 2018, defeating incumbent Ohio House of Representatives member and former U.S. representative John Boccieri. Prior to that contest, Rulli's only other political experience was as a school board member for the Leetonia Exempted Village School District in Columbiana County, Ohio. Rulli was re-elected in 2022, defeating former Ohio House and Ohio Senate member Bob Hagan.

In 2019, Rulli was one of 12 senators to vote against Ohio House Bill 6, the legislation at the center of the Ohio FirstEnergy bribery scandal.

In 2019, Rulli co-sponsored Ohio Senate Bill 23, widely referred to as the "Heartbeat Bill". This legislation bans most abortions once a fetal heartbeat can be detected, typically around six weeks into pregnancy—often before many people are aware they are pregnant. The bill provides no exceptions for rape or incest. Governor Mike DeWine signed it into law on April 11, 2019.

Rulli's support for the bill aligned with a broader movement among Ohio Republicans to impose stricter abortion regulations. SB 23 became one of the most restrictive abortion laws in the country and faced swift legal challenges. A temporary court order blocked the law's enforcement in September 2022, restoring abortion access in the state up to 22 weeks while the legislation underwent further judicial review.

During the COVID-19 pandemic, Rulli championed legislation to prevent municipalities from banning the use of plastic grocery bags. The House version of Rulli's legislation, HB 242 was signed into law by Governor Mike DeWine in October 2020.

Rulli was a co-sponsor of the Ohio Fairness Act, legislation that would expand state civil rights protections to prohibit discrimination on the basis of sexual orientation and gender identity. In January 2024, Rulli voted to override Governor DeWine's veto of HB 68, a bill banning gender-affirming care for minors and prohibiting transgender athletes from participating in girls' and women's sports.

== U.S. House of Representatives (2024–present) ==
Rulli became the Republican nominee on March 19, 2024, for the 2024 special election for Ohio's 6th congressional district, and defeated Democrat Michael Kripchak on June 11. On June 12, Rulli announced his resignation from the Ohio Senate.

Rulli was sworn in to the 118th U.S. Congress on June 25, 2024. Then-state representative Al Cutrona was sworn in to Rulli's former Senate seat on June 26. On November 5, 2024, Rulli won re-election to a full term with about 66% of the vote, again defeating Kripchak.

Rulli currently serves as the co-chair of the bicameral and bipartisan Italian American Congressional Delegation (IACD).

In January 2025, Rulli hired Mike Peppel as his communications director in his congressional office. Peppel had previously settled civil litigation with the Ohio Attorney General's office over his role in an alleged fraudulent charity scheme that solicited donations purportedly to help residents of East Palestine after the 2023 train derailment.

In July 2025, Rulli introduced a resolution to designate July 13 as "Faith and Defiance Day," intended to honor President Trump's response to the 2024 assassination attempt, which Rulli described as a display of "unshakable courage," and to condemn political violence.

In November 2025, Rulli was one of only two Republicans who did not vote on the Epstein Files Transparency Act.

In August 2026, NOTUS reported that Rulli had failed to timely disclose 22 stock transactions made between late 2024 and 2026, in violation of the STOCK Act.

=== Committee assignments ===
- Committee on Education and Workforce
  - Subcommittee on Early Childhood, Elementary, and Secondary Education
  - Subcommittee on Health, Employment, Labor, and Pensions
- Committee on Energy and Commerce
  - Subcommittee on Energy
  - Subcommittee on Health
  - Subcommittee on Oversight & Investigations

=== Caucus memberships ===
- Republican Governance Group

== Personal life ==
Rulli resides in Salem, Ohio with his wife Kelly and their two children.

On November 28, 2022, Rulli fired a handgun at two teenagers he believed were trespassing on his property. Later, his wife, Kelly Rulli, fired shots at one of the teenagers and his family members who had returned to retrieve hunting equipment. While Rulli claims he fired warning shots into the ground from a distance of approximately 15 yards, the teenager maintains he was much farther away on his uncle's land and that the shots were fired directly at him. A special prosecutor's investigation, which found no physical evidence (such as shell casings or bullets), concluded that the Rulli's actions were reasonable under the circumstances and declined to press charges against either party, though it did determine the teenagers were trespassing.

U.S. House of Representatives
Preceded by Bill Johnson	Member of the U.S. House of Representatives from Ohio's 6th congressional district 2024–present	Incumbent
U.S. order of precedence (ceremonial)
Preceded by Vince Fong	United States representatives by seniority 360th	Succeeded by LaMonica McIver
