= Jamie Callender =

American politician (born 1965)

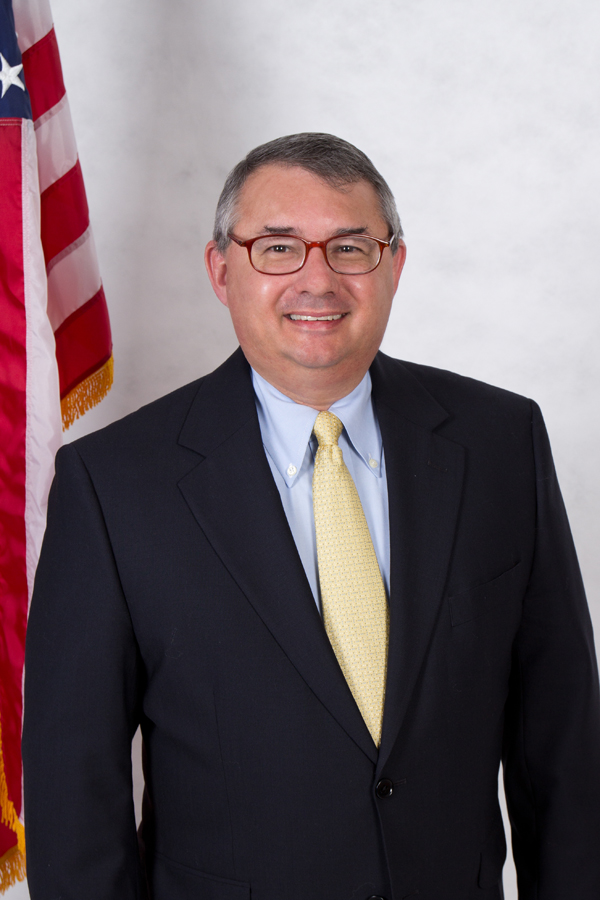

Member of the Ohio House of Representatives from the 57th district
- Incumbent
- Assumed office January 7, 2019
- Preceded by: Ron Young
- In office January 3, 1997 – December 31, 2004
- Preceded by: Dan Troy
- Succeeded by: Lorraine Fende

Personal details
- Born: January 9, 1965 (age 61) Mayfield, Kentucky, U.S.
- Party: Republican
- Height: 5 ft 1 in (155 cm)
- Education: Cleveland State University (BA, JD)
- Profession: Attorney

Jamie Callender (born January 9, 1965) is an American lawyer and college professor who has served as a member of the Ohio House of Representatives since 2019. He represents the 57th district which includes the Lake County communities of Concord Township, Kirtland, Kirtland Hills, LeRoy Township, Madison, Madison Township, North Perry, Perry, Perry Township, Waite Hill, Willoughby Hills, as well as most of both Mentor and Painesville Township. He currently is Chairman of Public Utilities and Finance, as well as serving on Civil Justice, Joint Education Oversight Committee, Rules and Reference Ohio House Committees.

After practicing law full-time as a partner at Buckley King LPA, he founded Callender Law Group and The Callender Group, education law and consulting firms based in Concord and Columbus, Ohio, and Nashville, Tennessee. Callender is also an adjunct professor of political science at Kent State University for the Columbus Program in Intergovernmental Issues.

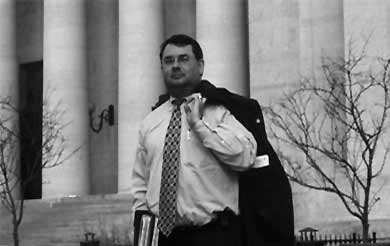
Ohio state Representative Jamie Callender

In 1997, Callender was elected to the Ohio House of Representatives, and would be elected three more times. As Chairman of the Ohio House Education Committee, Callender was involved in the creation of Ohio's charter school laws and later legislative reforms related to community ("charter") schools, and the introduction of the concept of "value added" as a measurement of a child's educational progress. Callender was also appointed as Ohio's representative on the Education Commission of the States (ECS), which worked with the Bush administration and various state governors to develop national education standards and accountability measurements, work which led to the No Child Left Behind Act.

In 2004, Callendar was term limited from the state House and unsuccessfully ran for the state Senate, losing in the Republican primary to Tim Grendell. In 2018, he successfully returned to the Ohio House, winning an open seat similar to the seat he previously represented.

In 2021, Callender introduced an overhaul of the state's education funding system, the Ohio Fair School Funding Plan (HB 1).

== Association with Team Householder ==
During the 2018 Ohio House election cycle, Jamie Callender was identified in reporting as one of the Republican candidates recruited by then-State Representative Larry Householder as part of an organized effort to regain the speakership of the Ohio House of Representatives. According to an investigation by Cleveland.com, Householder assembled a slate of candidates, commonly referred to as “Team Householder,” who were encouraged to run for office with the expectation that they would support his bid for Speaker if elected. Schmidt was listed among the candidates recruited as part of this strategy.

The successful election of multiple Team Householder candidates enabled Householder to secure enough internal support to be elected Speaker at the start of the 133rd Ohio General Assembly.

=== Vote on the Expulsion of Larry Householder ===
During the 134th Ohio General Assembly, Jamie Callender voted against the expulsion of former House Speaker Larry Householder, who had been federally indicted and later convicted in connection with the Ohio nuclear bribery scandal tied to House Bill 6. The Ohio House voted 75–21 to expel Householder, with Jamie Callender among the 21 Republican members who opposed the resolution.

== First Energy scandal ==
In 2019, Callender was one of two primary sponsors of House Bill 6 (HB 6), legislation that provided subsidies to Ohio's two nuclear power plants and made other changes to the state's energy policy. Alongside Representative Shane Wilkin, he introduced the bill in April 2019, and it was signed into law by Governor Mike DeWine in July 2019.

In July 2020, federal prosecutors charged then–House Speaker Larry Householder and others with racketeering in what they described as a $60 million bribery scheme funded by FirstEnergy Corporation to secure passage of HB 6.

Callender was not charged in the case, but his campaign was among those that reportedly benefited from outside spending connected to the scheme. He later said he had no knowledge of any corrupt plan and described himself as feeling "betrayed" if the allegations were true.

The scandal led to Householder's removal as Speaker, his 2023 conviction on racketeering conspiracy charges, and a 20-year federal prison sentence. FirstEnergy later admitted to paying bribes and agreed to pay a $230 million criminal penalty as part of a deferred prosecution agreement.

Although Callender remained a legislator after the scandal, HB 6 and its aftermath continued to draw criticism over the influence of utility companies and "dark money" in Ohio politics.

== Links ==
- Representative Jamie Callendar (official site)
