= 2024 Ohio's 6th congressional district special election =

- June 11, 2024

Ohio's 6th congressional district
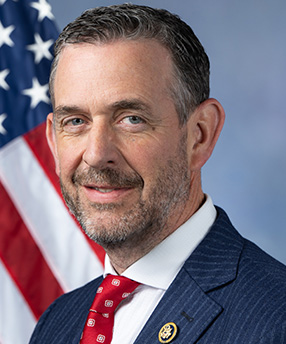

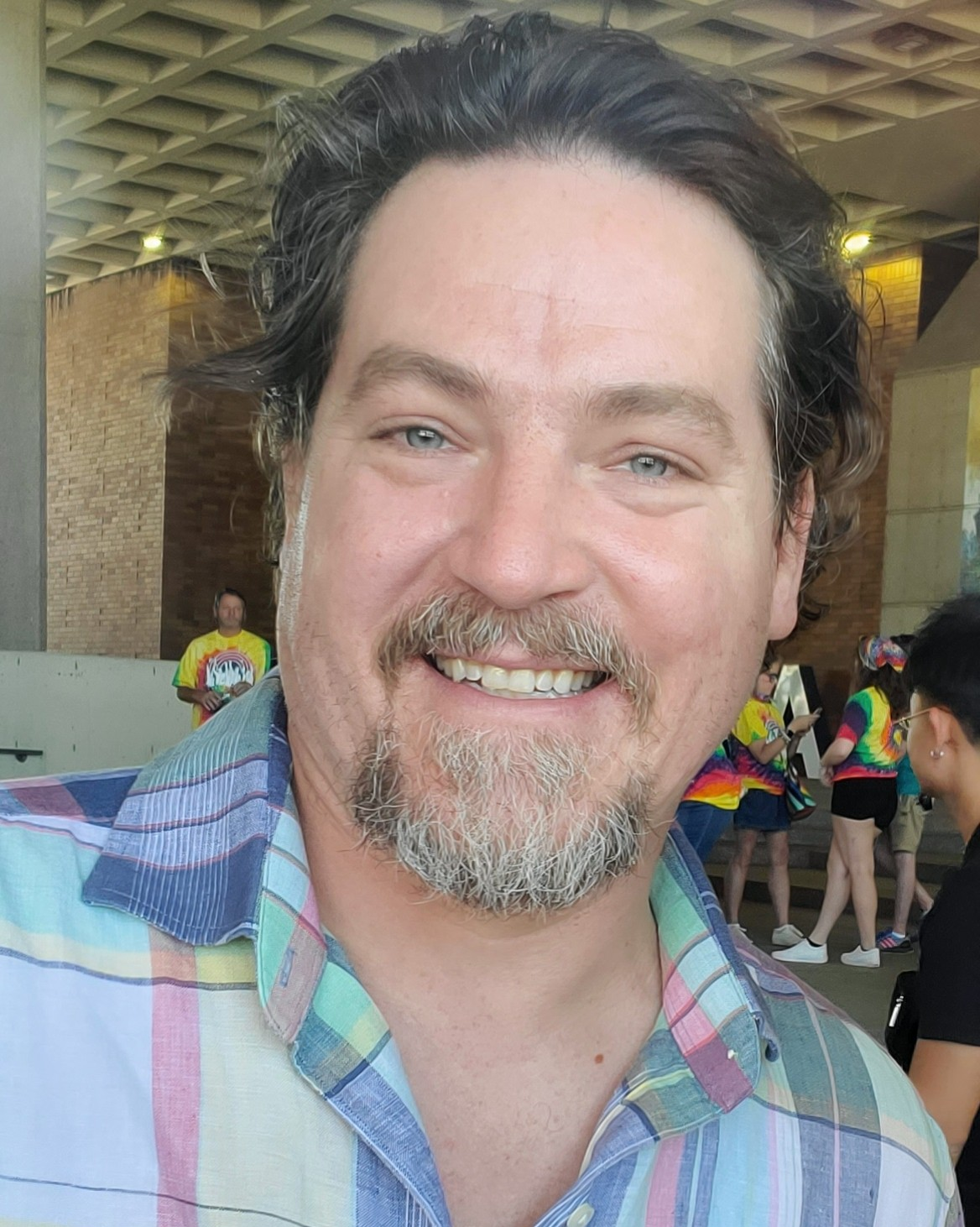
Nominee	Michael Rulli	Michael Kripchak
Party	Republican	Democratic
Popular vote	32,747	27,173
Percentage	54.64%	45.34%
- Rulli: 50–60% 60–70% 70–80% 80–90% >90% Kripchak: 50–60% 60–70% 70–80% 80–90% >90% Tie: 50% No votes
U.S. Representative before election
Bill Johnson
Republican
Elected U.S. Representative
Michael Rulli
Republican

The 2024 Ohio's 6th congressional district special election was held on June 11, 2024, to fill the vacant seat in Ohio's 6th congressional district for the remainder of the 118th United States Congress. The seat became vacant on January 21, 2024, after Bill Johnson resigned to become president of Youngstown State University. The 6th district, largely rural in character with several smaller industrial cities, is considered a safe Republican seat.

Republican Michael Rulli defeated Democratic candidate Michael Kripchak with 54.62% of the vote. Although Rulli won, the margin was considerably narrower than expected. Both Rulli and Kripchak faced off again in the November election, with Rulli more than tripling his margin of victory to 33 points.

Rulli was sworn in on June 25.

== Background ==
Republican Bill Johnson was re-elected to Congress in 2022 from Ohio's 6th district. On November 21, 2023, Johnson announced he would resign to accept a position as president of Youngstown State University in 2024. On January 2, he announced he would resign earlier than expected on January 21 of that same year. On January 4, Governor Mike DeWine announced a primary election scheduled for March 19, and a general election on June 11.

== Republican primary ==
=== Candidates ===
==== Nominee ====
- Michael Rulli, state senator (2019–present)

==== Eliminated in primary ====
- Reggie Stoltzfus, state representative (2019–present)
- Rick Tsai, chiropractor

=== Endorsements ===
Michael Rulli

Organizations

- U.S. Chamber of Commerce
Reggie Stoltzfus

Organizations

- FRC Action

=== Results ===
Republican primary for the 2024 Ohio's 6th congressional district special election
Party	Candidate	Votes	%
Republican	Michael Rulli	43,155	49.08%
Republican	Reggie Stoltzfus	35,684	40.58%
Republican	Rick Tsai	9,094	10.34%
Total votes		87,933	100.00%

== Democratic primary ==
=== Candidates ===
==== Nominee ====
- Michael Kripchak, businessman

==== Eliminated in primary ====
- Rylan Finzer, marijuana business owner

=== Results ===
Democratic primary for the 2024 Ohio's 6th congressional district special election
Party	Candidate	Votes	%
Democratic	Michael Kripchak	19,931	65.00%
Democratic	Rylan Finzer	10,731	35.00%
Total votes		30,662	100.00%

== General election ==
=== Results ===
2024 Ohio's 6th congressional district special election
Party	Candidate	Votes	%	±%
Republican	Michael Rulli	32,747	54.64%	−13.08
Democratic	Michael Kripchak	27,173	45.34%	+13.06
Independent	Christopher Lafont (write-in)	12	0.02%	N/A
Total votes		59,932	100.00%	

By county

County	Michael Rulli Republican		Michael Kripchak Democratic		Christopher Lafont (Write-in)		Margin		Total votes
County	#	%	#	%	#	%	#	%	Total votes
Belmont	2,591	58.33	1,849	41.63	2	0.05	742	16.70	4,442
Carroll	1,480	67.27	718	32.64	2	0.09	762	34.64	2,200
Columbiana	5,529	65.45	2,918	34.54	1	0.01	2,611	30.91	8,448
Harrison	716	64.33	397	35.67	0	0.00	319	28.66	1,113
Jefferson	2,837	57.19	2,123	42.79	1	0.02	714	14.39	4,961
Mahoning	11,683	49.93	11,718	50.07	0	0.00	-35	-0.06	23,401
Monroe	561	59.68	378	40.21	1	0.11	183	19.47	940
Noble	432	63.72	246	36.28	0	0.00	186	27.43	678
Stark	3,389	51.91	3,137	48.05	2	0.03	252	3.86	6,528
Tuscarawas	1,305	43.51	1,691	56.39	3	0.10	-386	-12.87	2,999
Washington	2,224	52.68	1,998	47.32	0	0.00	226	5.35	4,222
Total	32,747	54.64	27,173	45.34	12	0.02	5,574	9.30	59,932

== See also ==
- 2024 Ohio elections
