= Tom Letson =

American politician

Member of the Ohio House of Representatives from the 64th district
- In office January 2, 2007 – December 31, 2014
- Preceded by: Randy Law
- Succeeded by: Michael O'Brien

Personal details
- Born: September 29, 1952 (age 74) Columbus, Ohio
- Party: Democratic
- Education: Kent State University, University of Akron
- Profession: Attorney, Machinist
- Website: http://www.tomletson.com

Tom Letson (born September 29, 1952 in Columbus, Ohio) is a former Democratic member of the Ohio House of Representatives, representing the 64th District from 2007 to 2014.

== Life and career ==
Letson was born in Columbus, but shortly after his birth the family moved back to the Warren, Ohio area. He attended Champion Local Schools, graduating in 1970 and then attended St. Bonaventure University, graduating from Kent State University in 1983 with a BA. Tom enrolled in the University of Akron School of Law and received his JD in 1988. At the same time, Letson served a machinist apprenticeship, becoming a Journeyman while working at Copperweld Steel Corp.

After being sworn into the legal profession by his former employer, Judge Robert A. Nader, Tom joined the law firm founded by his father and uncle, Letson, Griffith, Woodall & Lavelle.

Judge Nader later swore Tom into the House for Letson's first term in December 2006. Nader held that legislative seat until 1983 when he returned to Warren to become a Common Pleas judge.

Letson is married to the former Debra J. Whaley. They reside in Warren, Ohio, with one daughter.

== Ohio House of Representatives ==
Letson defeated one-term incumbent Republican Randy Law with 4.5% of the vote in 2006. He was re-elected in 2008, receiving 67.5% of the vote.

He served as chairman on the Ways & Means Committee, and on the Health Committee, on the Public Safety and Homeland Security Committee, and as Vice-Chair of the Insurance Committee. In 2008 Letson's opponent, Thomas Montgomery D.C. lost by 35%. Letson said that "Tom Montgomery is one of the nicest people to enter politics in Trumbull County. We need more citizens like him." In 2010, Letson defeated Republican Albert Haberstroh with 62.57% of the vote to take a third term. Currently he is serving on the committees of Insurance and its Subcommittee on Workers' Compensation, Judiciary and Ethics, State Government and Elections and its Subcommittee on Redistricting (as ranking member), and Ways and Means (as ranking member). He also is a member of the Workers’ Compensation Council until it was defunded in HB 153.

Letson won a final term in 2012 with 59.76% over former Representative Randy Law. He continued to serve on the Ways and Means Committee as the ranking minority member.
