= Ron Young (politician) =

American politician

Member of the Ohio House of Representatives from the 61st district
- In office January 3, 2011 – December 31, 2018
- Preceded by: Mark Schneider
- Succeeded by: Jamie Callender
- In office January 3, 1997-December 31, 2004
- Preceded by: Ray Sines
- Succeeded by: Tim Cassell

Personal details
- Born: August 20, 1946 (age 80) Canton, Ohio, U.S.
- Party: Republican
- Education: Kent State University, Cleveland State University
- Profession: Business Owner

Ron Young (born August 20, 1946) is a Commissioner for Lake County, Ohio and is a former member of the Ohio House of Representatives serving from 2011 to 2018 and again from 1997 to 2004.

== Career ==
Young served in the United States Army for three years, and attended Kent State University, where he received a bachelor's degree in Psychology. He taught before founding Technical Employment Services Inc. in 1981. He married in 1974 and has five daughters. His wife Kathaleen passed away in 2020. He has since remarried.

== Ohio House of Representatives ==
Young first sought to replace Ray Sines in 1996, when he defeated Sines in the Republican primary by 150 votes. He also won the general election. He won reelection against Democrat Jeanette Crislip in 1998 with 54.14% of the vote. He won reelection with 52.1% of the vote in 2000, He won a final term in 2004 with 7,000 votes over Democrat Tim Cassell.

Young, term-limited, initially filed to run for the Ohio Senate in 2004, but withdrew and ran for Lake County, Ohio Treasurer by filing day.

In early 2010, Young announced that he would seek to return to his former seat in the fall elections. While he faced no primary opposition, he faced incumbent Mark Schneider in the general election. He defeated Schneider to with 53.14% of the vote.

Young was sworn into his fifth overall term on January 3, 2011. He serves on the committees of State Government and Elections; Veterans Affairs, Criminal Justice; and Commerce and Labor (as chairman).

In 2012, Young won a second term with 54.38% over Democrat Susan McGuinness. He would go on to be re-elected two more times. Young represented the 61st District, which replaced the 63rd District.

== Policies and initiatives ==
Although Young's district has a strong blue collar population, he remained a proponent of a bill that set forth to limit collective bargaining for public employees. He is especially in favor of a measure that allows workers who do not want to join the union to not have to pay dues. He voted for the bill out of committee, calling his vote a matter of mathematics. Young voted for final passage of the bill, and stated that he believes that public employees are still properly protected.

Young, along with Lynn Slaby, has proposed legislation that aims to speed up resolutions surrounding consumer lawsuits.
