= Glenn Holmes =

American politician

Member of the Ohio House of Representatives from the 63rd District
- In office January 3, 2017 – April 29, 2019
- Preceded by: Sean O'Brien
- Succeeded by: Gil Blair

Personal details
- Party: Democratic
- Education: Mount Union College (B.S.)

Glenn Holmes is a former state representative for the 63rd District of the Ohio House of Representatives. He is a Democrat.

== Life and career ==
Holmes was born and raised in the Mahoning Valley. He graduated from Girard High School before attending Mount Union College, where he received a bachelor's in sociology. Holmes is a father of three and a grandfather of four.

In 2008, Holmes was elected the mayor of McDonald, Ohio, after serving as a councilmember there prior to that. There, he focused on employee healthcare and responsible budgeting, and when he left office the town had a $2 million surplus.

== Ohio House of Representatives ==
After serving as Mayor for over nine years, Holmes decided to run for an open seat in the Ohio House of Representatives in 2016. The seat became open when three-term state Representative Sean O'Brien decided to run for the Ohio Senate, where Senator Capri Cafaro was term-limited. A reliably Democratic seat, Holmes faced two other Democrats for the nomination, but won with a plurality of 44% of the vote.

Despite Donald Trump winning Trumbull County, the first time a Republican had done so in over eight decades, Holmes easily defeated Republican Devon A. Stanley by a 60% to 40% margin to take the seat.
