= Michele Lepore-Hagan =

American politician

Member of the Ohio House of Representatives from the 58th district
- In office January 3, 2015 – January 3, 2023
- Preceded by: Bob Hagan
- Succeeded by: Lauren McNally

Personal details
- Born: April 4, 1955 (age 71)
- Party: Democratic
- Spouse: Bob Hagan
- Education: Ohio University (BFA)

Michele Lepore-Hagan (born April 4, 1955) is an American politician and member of the Democratic Party who held a seat in the Ohio House of Representatives for the 58th District from 2015 to 2023. The spouse of longtime Ohio politician Bob Hagan, she succeeded her husband after he was term-limited.

== Career ==
Prior to running for the Ohio House of Representatives, Lepore-Hagan worked for Youngstown State University as the director for the university's performing arts series. She also lived in New York City for a time as an aspiring performer. She is a graduate of Ohio University.

Lepore-Hagan was unopposed in the general election in 2014, and won subsequent elections in 2016, 2018, and 2020.

As a State Representative, she spoke out against the CEO Takeover of Youngstown's City's School District. "Our community cares deeply about our children and our public school system. Local education decisions should be made in consultation with parents, teachers, regional lawmakers, business leaders and local education officials – not by Columbus outsiders who do not understand our unique and diverse community.". She also sought an audit of CEO-run schools and transparency in Youngstown's school districts.

In 2017, Lepore-Hagan was elected Vice-Chair of the Ohio House Democratic Women's Caucus where she was seeking to "improve women's opportunities in government and workforce."

As a legislator, she introduced and passed TechCred, bipartisan legislation that expands job training and workforce development opportunities in Ohio. And she pushed to ban confederate memorabilia at state fairs. She also proposed the "Fair Lending through Land Contracts" bill, targeting unfair lending practices by out-of-state investment firms.

Lepore-Hagan took steps to address the public health impacts of racism, co-sponsoring a bill to declare racism public health crisis in Ohio. She said of the bill, "Government must do more in acknowledging and addressing the real experiences of Black Ohioans. These disparities in health, education, income and more will only be fixed when more leaders step up and see the impact of racism for what it is."

She also played a role in helping Ohio recover from the Covid-19 pandemic, announcing that the state Controlling Board established the State Fiscal Recovery Fund, "which will allow Ohio to accept an estimated $5.5 billion under the recently passed American Rescue Plan (ARP) to support Ohioans during the COVID-19 pandemic and aid the state's economic recovery once appropriated."

In 2021, Lepore-Hagan was a primary sponsor the resolution to expel Speaker of the House, Larry Householder for his alleged role in a $60 million public bribery and corruption scheme to pass and prevent a referendum on a billion-dollar corporate bailout in 2019.

In 2022, Lepore Hagan co-sponsored the Reproductive Freedom Act to create a constitutional amendment "ensuring Ohioans had freedom to make decisions about their bodies and healthcare.". A year later, Ohio voters passed a ballot initiative to "enshrine abortion access in the constitution."

In 2020, a representative from the Youngstown-based African Education Party, claimed that Lepore-Hagan made racist remarks regarding House Bill 70. When reached for comment, Lepore-Hagan said she wasn’t interested in commenting. But said she been fighting against HB 70 even before it was signed into law.

== Links ==
- Official campaign site
