= Randy Law =

American politician

Member of the Ohio House of Representatives from the 64th district
- In office January 3, 2005 – December 31, 2006
- Preceded by: Daniel Sferra
- Succeeded by: Tom Letson

Personal details
- Party: Republican

Randy Law is a former member of the Ohio House of Representatives, representing the 64th District for one term in the Ohio 126th General Assembly.
