= 2026 Ohio Attorney General election =

- November 3, 2026
- Reporting: 98% as of 11:44 AM EST
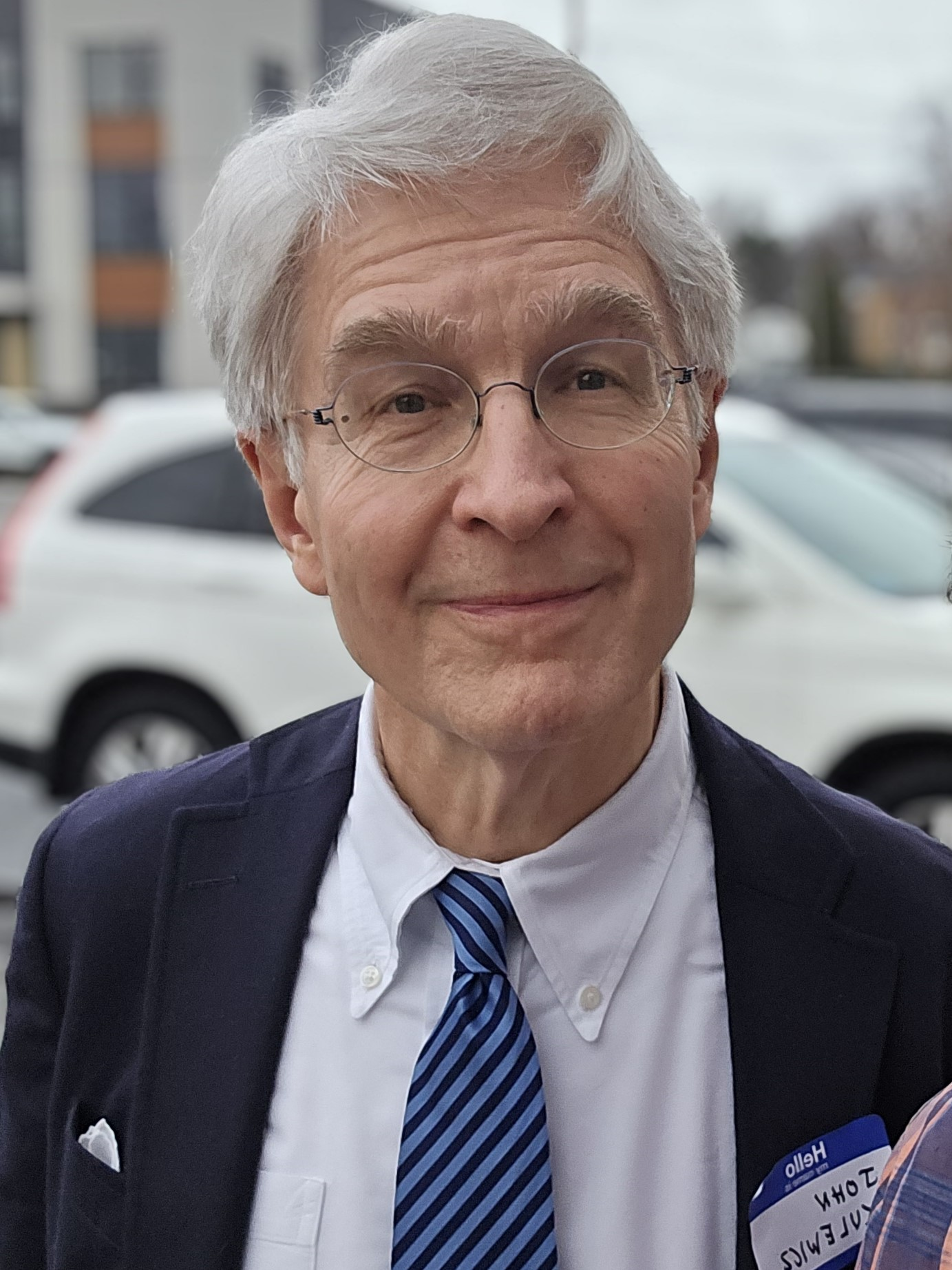

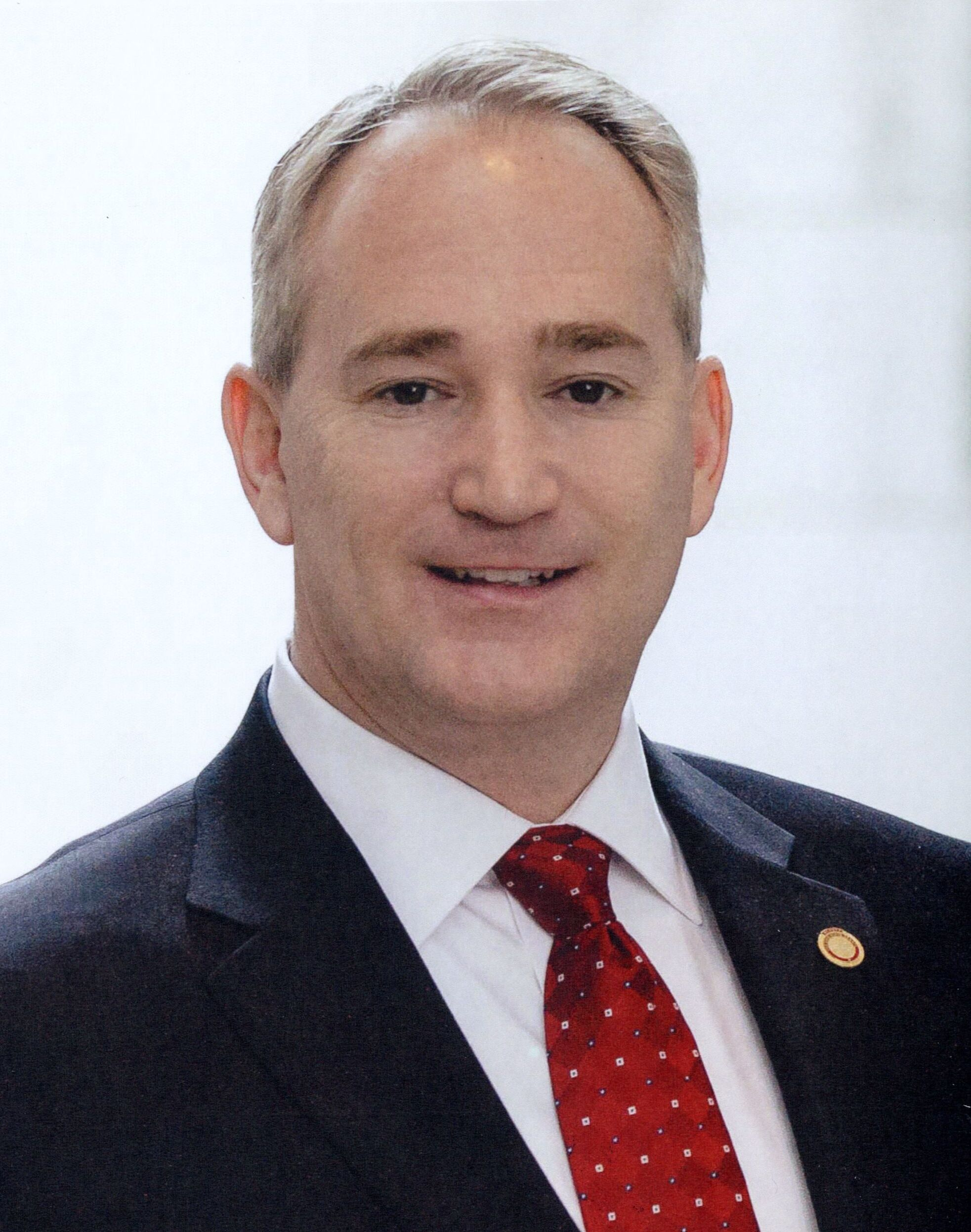
Nominee	John Kulewicz	Keith Faber
Party	Democratic	Republican
Popular vote	2,285,117	2,256,710
Percentage	50.31%	49.69%
- Kulewicz: 50–60% 60–70% 70–80% Faber: 50–60% 60–70% 70–80% 80–90%
Attorney General before election
Andy Wilson (Note: Incumbent attorney general Dave Yost announced that he would resign effective June 7, 2026. Governor Mike DeWine appointed Andy Wilson as the appointee to complete Yost's term.)
Republican
Elected Attorney General
John Kulewicz
Democratic

The 2026 Ohio Attorney General election was held on November 3, 2026, to elect the attorney general of Ohio. John Kulewicz narrowly defeated his Republican opponent, State Auditor Keith Faber. Kulewicz will succeed Republican incumbent Andy Wilson, who succeeded Dave Yost after his resignation. Yost was ineligible to seek a third consecutive term. This is the first time since 2008 a Democrat has been elected to the position in Ohio.

Primary elections were held on May 5.

== Interim appointment ==
On May 7, 2026, Dave Yost announced he would resign as attorney general effective June 7, 2026. On May 11, 2026, Governor Mike DeWine announced that Andy Wilson, the director of the Ohio Department of Public Safety, would serve out the remainder of Yost's term.

=== Candidates ===
==== Appointee ====
- Andy Wilson, director of Ohio Department of Public Safety (2022–2026)

==== Considered but not appointed ====
- Keith Faber, Ohio state auditor (2019–present)

== Republican primary ==
=== Candidates ===
==== Nominee ====
- Keith Faber, Ohio state auditor (2019–present)

==== Declined ====
- Vivek Ramaswamy, former CEO of Roivant Sciences (2014–2021) and candidate for president in 2024 (ran for governor)

=== Endorsements ===
Keith Faber

Labor unions

- Central Midwest Regional Council of Carpenters

Organizations

- Club for Growth
- Ohio Republican Party

=== Results ===
Republican primary results
Party	Candidate	Votes	%
Republican	Keith Faber	698,856	100.0
Total votes		698,856	100.0

== Democratic primary ==
=== Candidates ===
==== Nominee ====
- John Kulewicz, Upper Arlington city councilor

==== Eliminated in primary ====
- Elliot Forhan, former state representative (2023–2024)

=== Endorsements ===
John Kulewicz

Labor unions

- Ohio AFL-CIO
- Ohio Education Association
- United Auto Workers of America
- United Mine Workers of America

Organizations

- Planned Parenthood Advocates of Ohio

Political parties

- Ohio Democratic Party

=== Results ===
Primary results by county: Kulewicz: 50–60%; 60–70%; 70–80%; Forhan: 50–60%

Democratic primary results
Party	Candidate	Votes	%
Democratic	John Kulewicz	445,336	63.1
Democratic	Elliot Forhan	260,407	36.9
Total votes		705,743	100.0

== General election ==
=== Predictions ===
Source	Ranking	As of
Sabato's Crystal Ball	Lean R	October 29, 2026

=== Post-primary endorsements ===
Keith Faber (R)

Executive branch officials

- Donald Trump, 45th and 47th president of the United States (2017–2021, 2025–present)

Statewide officials

- Mike DeWine, governor of Ohio (2019–present)
- Andy Wilson, attorney general of Ohio (2026–present)

Labor unions

- Fraternal Order of Police of Ohio
- Ohio Patrolmen's Benevolent Association

Organizations

- National Federation of Independent Businesses Ohio
- Ohio Right to Life PAC
John Kulewicz (D)

Labor unions

- Communications Workers of America
- Ohio Federation of Teachers
- United Mine Workers of America COMPAC

=== Polling ===
Poll source	Date(s) administered	Sample size (Note: Key: A – all adults RV – registered voters LV – likely voters V – unclear)	Margin of error	Keith Faber (R)	John Kulewicz (D)	Undecided
Tulchin Research (D) (Note: Poll sposored by Kulewicz's campaign)	July 29 – August 4, 2026	600 (LV)	± 4.0%	32%	36%	32%
Tulchin Research (D)	June 2–4, 2026	600 (LV)	± 4.0%	34%	34%	32%

=== Results ===
2026 Ohio Attorney General election
Party	Candidate	Votes	%	±%
Democratic	John Kulewicz	2,285,117	50.3%	
Republican	Keith Faber	2,256,710	49.7%	
Total votes		4,541,827	100.0	
Democratic gain from Republican				

== Notes ==
Partisan clients
