= John Kulewicz =

American attorney and politician (born 1954)

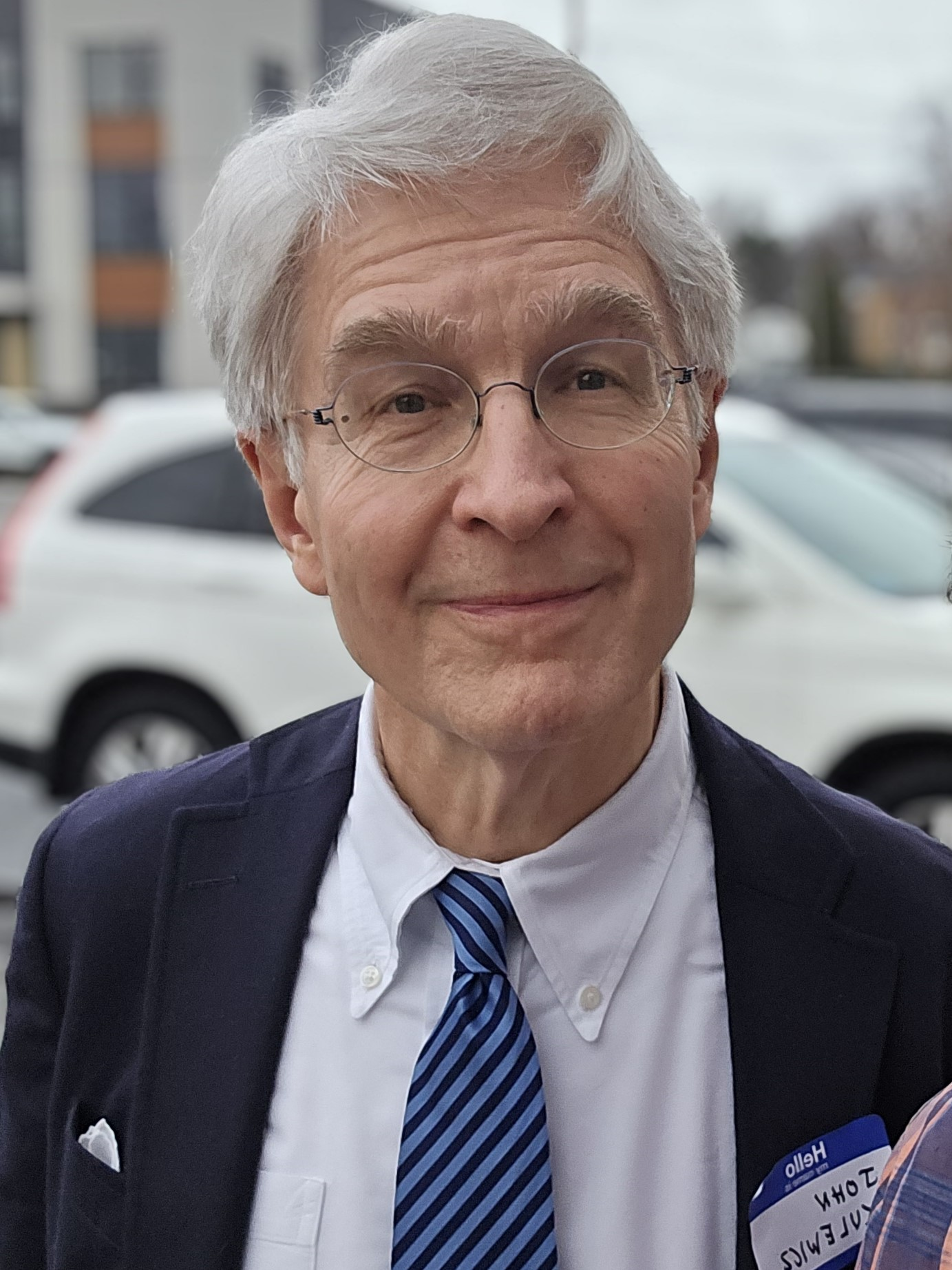
- Kulewicz in 2026

Attorney General-elect of Ohio
- Assuming office January 11, 2027
- Governor: Amy Acton (elect)
- Succeeding: Andy Wilson

Personal details
- Born: March 22, 1954 (age 72) Martin's Ferry, Ohio, U.S.
- Party: Democratic
- Education: Ohio State University (BA); Yale University (JD)
- Website: Campaign website

John J. Kulewicz (born March 22, 1954) is an American retired attorney and city councilor who is the Attorney General-elect of Ohio. As a litigator, Kulewicz has argued several prominent cases, including appearing in front of the United States Supreme Court. He narrowly defeated state auditor Keith Faber in the 2026 Ohio Attorney General election.

== Early life and education ==
Kulewicz was born on March 22, 1954, the son of Stanley and Marian (née Tuggle) Kulewicz. Kulewicz grew up in Columbus, Ohio where he attended St. Francis DeSales High School. He later attended Ohio State University studying American History. After graduating from Ohio State, Kulewicz attended Yale Law School, graduating in 1979. Kulewicz then clerked for Judge Gilbert S. Merritt Jr. of the United States Court of Appeals for the Sixth Circuit.

== Career ==
In 1981, Kulewicz began working at the Columbus-based law firm Vorys, Sater, Seymour & Pease in the litigation division, eventually becoming head of the appellate division, and then a partner in 1987. In 2018 and 2019, Kulewicz was named in Yale Law School's "Best Lawyers in America" in the fields of appellate law and civil rights litigation. In 2022, he argued before the United States Supreme Court in the case of Marietta Memorial Hospital Employee Health Benefit Plan v. DaVita Inc. Kulewicz retired from the firm in December 2024.

In 1984, Kulewicz was the Ohio campaign manager for former Colorado Senator Gary Hart's presidential campaign. Kulewicz later served on the board of the Columbus Zoo and Aquarium and was president of the Columbus Zoological Park Association board from 1997 to 1998. In 1998, while Kulewicz was board president, representatives of Arab and Muslim organizations criticized a ten-day zoo event commemorating the 50th anniversary of the founding of Israel, arguing that portions of the event were political rather than related to the zoo's mission. Kulewicz defended the event, saying that most of the activities pavilion had been devoted to Israeli wildlife conservation, research, education, and recreation. He said that the zoo "belongs to the whole community" and invited Arab and Muslim groups to organize an event at the zoo as well.

In 2019, Kulewicz was elected to his first term on city council of Upper Arlington, Ohio. He was re-elected to a second term in 2023. In 2025, Kulewicz published An Ohioan's Odyssey: Lessons in Leadership, Law, and Public Service, an autobiography issued by Gibraltar Publishing Company LLC. The book recounts his family background, legal career, involvement in politics and community organizations, and experiences in long-distance swimming. It was reviewed by C. Ellen Connally in CoolCleveland in October 2025.

== Attorney General of Ohio ==
In September 2025, Kulewicz announced his candidacy for Ohio Attorney General in the 2026 election. Kulewicz won his primary against former State Representative Elliot Forhan with 63.16% of the vote. He defeated Republican nominee and incumbent Ohio auditor Keith Faber in the November general election by a narrow 0.62% margin. Kulewicz is expected to take office on January 11th, 2027.

== Personal life ==
Kulewicz is married to his wife Maryline, whom he met while working on Gary Hart's 1984 presidential campaign. The couple have two children, and reside in the Columbus suburb of Upper Arlington, Ohio.

Kulewicz is also an avid swimmer, having captained three relay teams that crossed the English Channel, and having swam the Strait of Gibraltar, the Bosporus Strait, and the Sea of Galilee. In 2018, Kulewicz was part of a memorial swim in the Solomon Islands, consisting of a six-member team that swam the route of the survivors of the shipwreck of Navy patrol boat, PT 109, which was commanded by John F. Kennedy.

Party political offices
Preceded by Jeffrey Crossman	Democratic nominee for Attorney General of Ohio; 2026	Most recent
Legal offices
Preceded by Andy Wilson	Attorney General of Ohio; Taking office 2027	Elect
