= Keith Faber =

American lawyer and politician (born 1966)

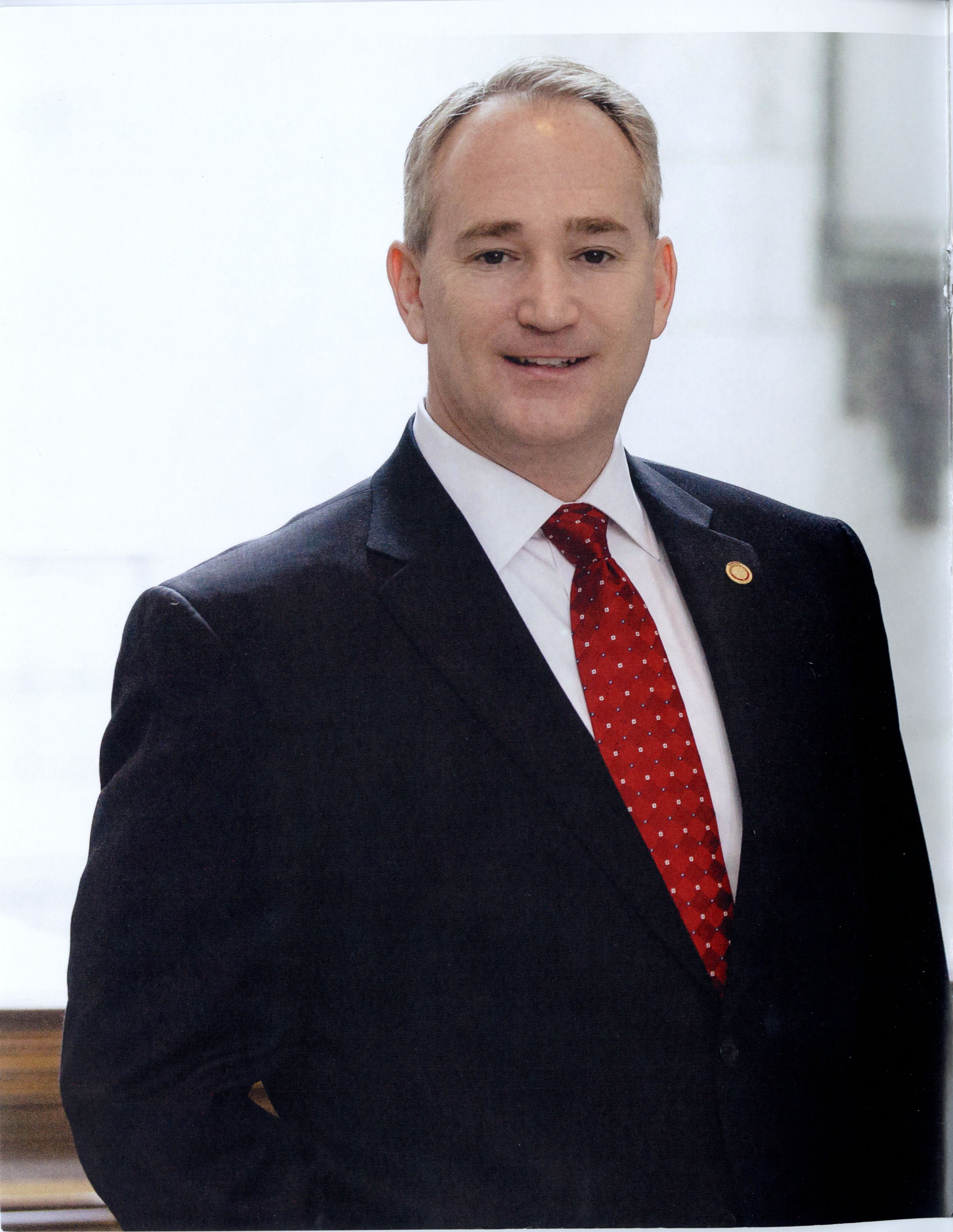

33rd Auditor of Ohio
- Incumbent
- Assumed office January 12, 2019
- Governor: Mike DeWine
- Preceded by: Dave Yost

Member of the Ohio House of Representatives from the 84th district
- In office January 3, 2017 – January 7, 2019
- Preceded by: Jim Buchy
- Succeeded by: Susan Manchester
- In office January 3, 2001 – January 2, 2007
- Preceded by: Jim Buchy
- Succeeded by: Jim Zehringer

94th President of the Ohio Senate
- In office January 7, 2013 – December 31, 2016
- Preceded by: Tom Niehaus
- Succeeded by: Larry Obhof

Member of the Ohio Senate from the 12th district
- In office January 2, 2007 – December 31, 2016
- Preceded by: Jim Jordan
- Succeeded by: Matt Huffman

Personal details
- Born: Keith Lloyd Faber; January 19, 1966 (age 60) Troy, Missouri, U.S.
- Party: Republican
- Spouse: Andrea Faber
- Children: 2
- Education: Oakland University (BA); Ohio State University (JD)

Keith Lloyd Faber (born January 19, 1966) is an American lawyer and politician from Ohio. A Republican, he has been State Auditor of Ohio since 2019. He was the Republican nominee for Ohio Attorney General in 2026, losing to Democrat John Kulewicz. He was formerly a member of the Ohio House of Representatives (2001–2007 and 2017-2018), elected from the 84th district, and then a member of the Ohio State Senate (2007–2016), elected from the 12th District. He was president of the Ohio Senate from 2013 to 2016.

== Life and career ==
Faber earned a Bachelor of Science in public administration and policy from Oakland University in Rochester, Michigan, in 1988, and a Juris Doctor from the Ohio State University Moritz College of Law in 1991.

Faber went on to found Faber & Associates, a civil litigation and mediation firm in Celina. He has served on the Ohio State Bar Association's Public Understanding of the Law Advisory Board and the editorial board of Ohio Lawyer Magazine, and belongs to the Ohio Association of Civil Trial Attorneys and the Defense Research and Trial Lawyers Association.

== Ohio House of Representatives ==
With incumbent Jim Buchy unable to run for another term in the House in 2000, Faber sought to replace him. He faced a primary race with fellow Republican Terry Haworth, and won by about 1,300 votes. He defeated Democrat Bill Sell in the general election by about 14,000 votes. He won reelection in 2002, 2004, and 2006 before being term-limited out.

== Ohio Senate ==
In January 2007, the 12th senate seat district in the Ohio Senate was vacated by Jim Jordan, who had been elected to the U.S. House of Representatives. Faber won the support of Senate Republicans and took the seat in the Senate in February 2007. Faber was one of seven candidates who sought to replace Jordan. Soon after the appointment, Senate President Bill Harris appointed Faber to the Senate Finance and Financial Institutions Committee. Faber won election to the seat in his own right on November 4, 2008, and was reelected in 2012.

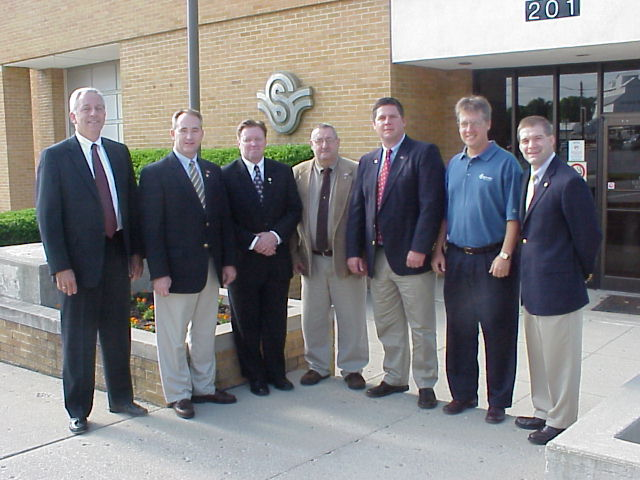
Opening of Congressman Jim Jordan's Sidney office in 2007. From left-to-right: John Garmhausen, State Senator Keith Faber, State Representative John Adams, Mayor Frank J. Mariano, City of Sidney, City Councilman Steve Hamby, Doug Borchers, Congressman Jim Jordan

Faber served as vice chairman of the Senate Insurance, Commerce and Labor Committee, chairman of the Senate Standing Committee on Government Oversight, and as a member of the budget-writing Senate Finance and Financial Institutions Committee. He also represented the Senate on the State Ballot Board, the Joint Legislative Ethics Committee, and the Legislative Service Commission board.

For the 128th General Assembly, Faber served as Senate majority floor leader, and in the 129th General Assembly, he served as president pro tempore under Senate President Tom Niehaus. As President pro tempore, Faber was also vice chairman of the Senate Rules and Reference Committee. Faber won reelection to a second term in 2012, defeating Libertarian Paul Hinds with 79.07% of the vote. Faber served as the 94th President of the Ohio Senate throughout his last term in the upper chamber, before being ineligible to run again in 2016 due to term limits at which point he was succeeded by Larry Obhof.

=== Legislative record as Senate President ===
According to his official legislative biography, Faber's priorities as Senate President included reducing state regulatory filings, cutting the state income tax, lowering the small-business tax rate, and creating the "Ohio Higher Education Challenge," a program intended to reduce the average cost of a degree at Ohio's public colleges and universities.

== Return to the Ohio House of Representatives ==
In 2016, Faber returned to the state house as a state Representative, winning the election with 83% of the vote against Democrat Ed Huff in the 2016 general election. Faber's return was again timed with Jim Buchy's retirement, in what perhaps strategically opened up the seat for Faber, who himself was term-limited from his seat in the Senate.

== Auditor of State ==
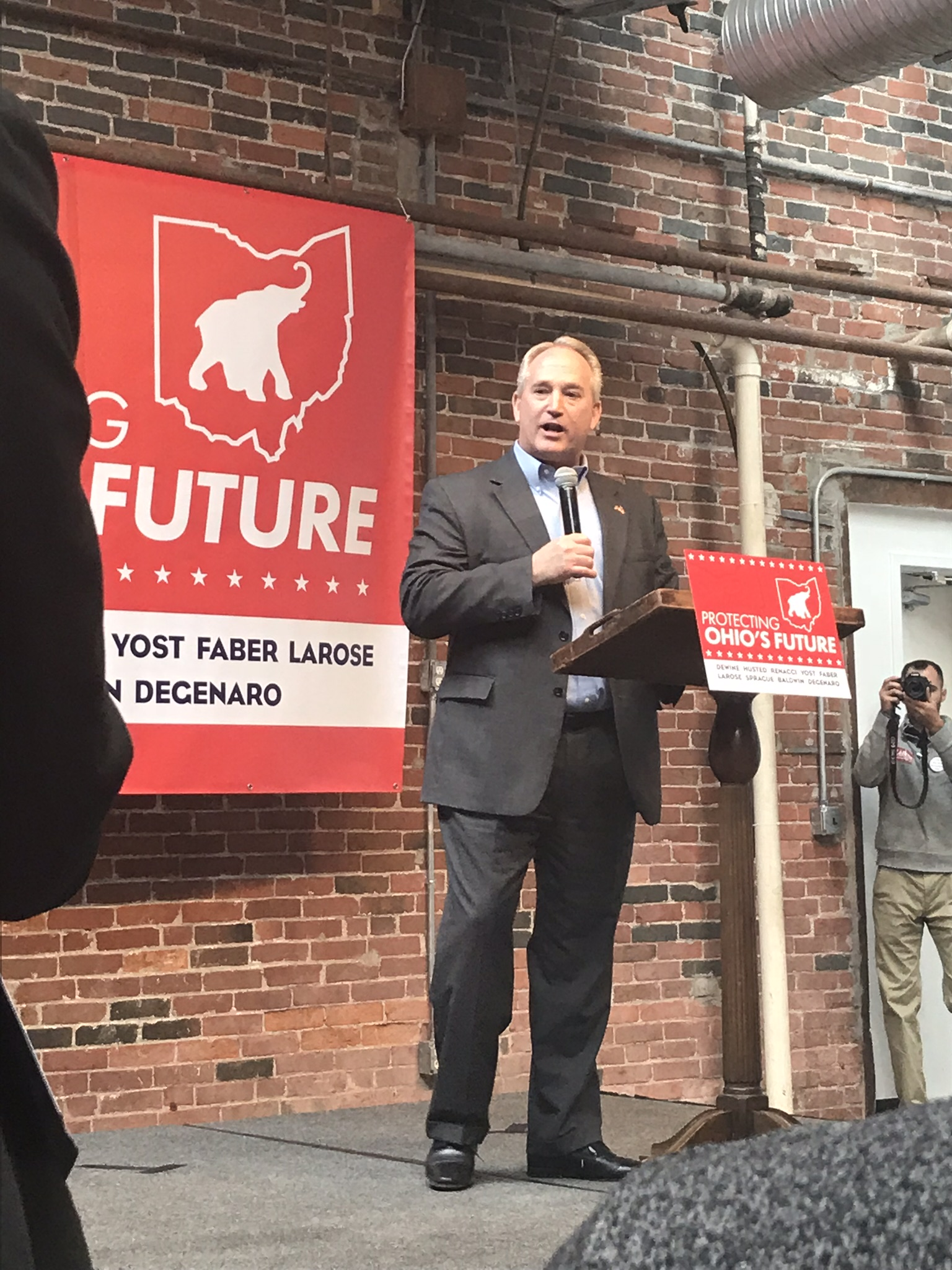
Faber speaking at a rally in 2018

=== Campaign ===
In February 2017, Faber announced his intention to run for Ohio Auditor of State. He ran unopposed for the Republican nomination after his only potential opponent, Ohio Speaker of the House Cliff Rosenberger, decided against challenging Faber in the May 2018 primary. During his campaign, Faber emphasized performance audits to promote government efficiency.

Faber faced former U.S. Representative Zack Space, the Democratic nominee, in the 2018 campaign for state auditor. In October 2018, the Associated Press published an investigation which revealed that Faber and his businesses incurred penalties for tax delinquencies between 2008 and 2015 across multiple properties and years and in two counties. Before Faber's tax payment history came to light, Faber had run digital ads attacking Space for his two tax penalties in 2005 and 2008. Both candidates cited administrative errors as the reason for the late payments. Space's campaign accused Faber of hypocrisy. Faber’s bookkeeper took responsibility for the delays.

On November 6, 2018, Faber was elected State Auditor. Faber received 49.66% of the vote, defeating Space, who received 46.28%.

=== Tenure ===
Faber was first inaugurated as auditor on January 12, 2019. He was inaugurated for a second term on January 9, 2023, joined by his family and sworn in by newly elected chief justice of the Ohio Supreme Court Sharon Kennedy.

=== Ohio Redistricting Commission ===
As Auditor of State, Faber has served since 2019 on the seven-member Ohio Redistricting Commission, which draws the state's legislative and congressional district maps alongside the governor, secretary of state, and four legislative appointees.

In 2024, Faber was among the commission's Republican members who opposed a proposed constitutional amendment that would have transferred map-drawing authority to an independent citizens commission; voters rejected the amendment that November.

In October 2025, Faber joined the rest of the commission in unanimously adopting a new congressional map ahead of the 2026 elections, after an earlier proposal drew a threatened repeal effort.

=== Fraud investigations and recoveries ===
As of August 2026, the Special Investigations Unit of Faber's office has secured 165 convictions on 376 criminal charges, resulting in 284 findings for recovery totaling $28,667,204.

During the COVID-19 pandemic, Faber's office was among the first state auditors to examine fraud within a state's unemployment compensation system, finding that tens of thousands of claims had been paid out to prisoners and deceased individuals; Faber estimated the state had made more than $5 billion in improper unemployment payments overall.

=== Attorney General campaign ===
Faber announced his campaign for Attorney General of Ohio on January 27, 2025, citing his background as a lawyer, legislator, and state auditor. He ran unopposed in the Republican primary, receiving the endorsement of the Club for Growth PAC in August 2025 and won the May 5, 2026 primary uncontested.

Two-term incumbent Attorney General Dave Yost was term-limited and did not seek reelection. Yost resigned early, effective June 7, 2026, to take a position with the Alliance Defending Freedom. Governor Mike DeWine appointed Andy Wilson, the state's public safety director to fill the vacancy over Faber. DeWine said he had considered naming Faber, but that doing so would likely have required a chain of further appointments, since Faber's move would open the auditor's office, currently held by Secretary of State Frank LaRose's opponent-turned-successor pipeline, with Treasurer Robert Sprague next in line behind that, and that installing multiple statewide officeholders this way, six months before a general election, "just seemed not the right thing to do."

Faber faced Democratic nominee John Kulewicz, an Upper Arlington city councilor and attorney, in the November 3, 2026 general election. Faber lost to Kulewicz by a narrow margin in the general election.

== Electoral history ==
Ohio House: Results 2000 to 2006
Year	HD	Democrat	Votes	Pct	Republican	Votes	Pct
2000	77	Bill Sell	18,232	36.2%	Keith Faber	32,132	63.8%
2002	77	Ben Amstutz	9,483	24.16%	Keith Faber	28,353	76.84%
2004	77	Betsy Marshall	17,131	30.2%	Keith Faber	39,600	60.8%
2006	77	Betsy Marshall	15,522	34.82%	Keith Faber	29,060	65.18%
2016	84	Ed Huff	9,607	16.62%	Keith Faber	48,191	83.38%

Ohio Senate: Results 2008 to 2012
Year	SD	Democrat	Votes	Pct	Republican	Votes	Pct	Independent	Votes	Pct	Libertarian	Votes	Pct
2008	12	Thomas Matthew	46,273	28.98%	Keith Faber	106,637	66.79%	Jack Kaffenberger	6,750	4.23%			
2012	12	None			Keith Faber	111,694	78.84%				Paul Hinds	29,974	21.16%

Auditor of State: Results 2018-2022
Year	Democrat	Votes	Pct	Republican	Votes	Pct	Libertarian	Votes	Pct
2018	Zack Space	2,006,204	46.28%	Keith Faber	2,152,769	49.66%	Robert C. Coogan	175,790	4.06%
2022	Taylor Sappington	1,683,216	41.25%	Keith Faber	2,397,207	58.75%			

== Personal life ==
Faber is married to Andrea Faber, and together they have two children. They reside in Celina, Ohio. He has a long-time private legal practice in Celina.

Ohio Senate
Preceded by Tom Niehaus	President of the Ohio Senate; 2013–2016	Succeeded by Larry Obhof
Party political offices
Preceded by Dave Yost	Republican nominee for Auditor of Ohio; 2018, 2022	Succeeded by Frank LaRose
Preceded by Dave Yost	Republican nominee for Attorney General of Ohio; 2026	Most recent
Political offices
Preceded by Dave Yost	Auditor of Ohio; 2019–present	Incumbent
