= Eric Synenberg =

American politician

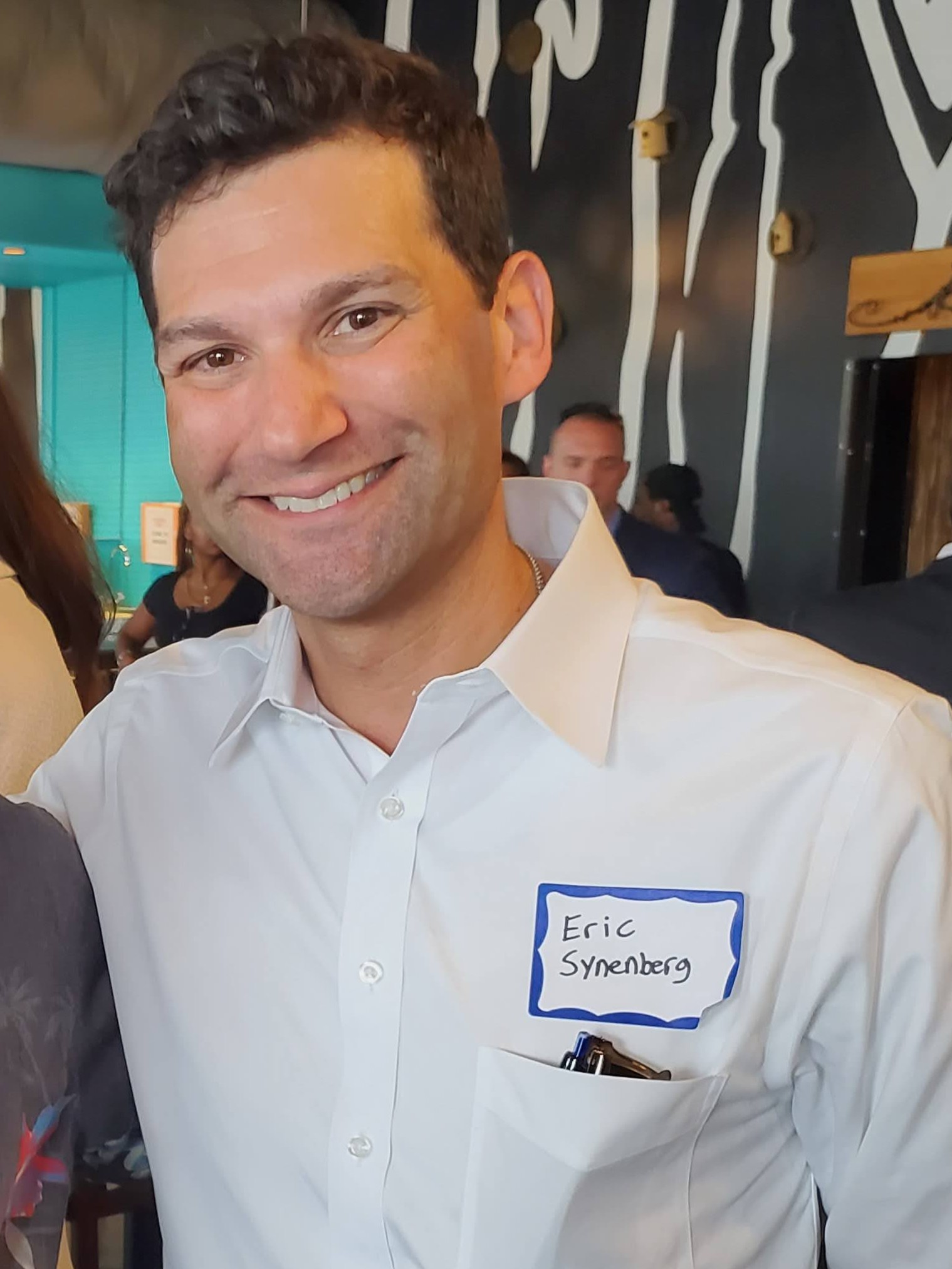

Member of the Ohio House of Representatives from the 21st district
- Incumbent
- Assumed office January 1, 2025
- Preceded by: Elliot Forhan

Personal details
- Party: Democratic Party
- Children: 3
- Education: Miami University, Cleveland State University, and University of Miami (Florida)

Eric Synenberg is an American attorney and politician who is a Democratic member of the Ohio House of Representatives, representing the 21st district. He was first elected in the 2024 Ohio House of Representatives election., in which he defeated Republican Joshua Malovasic, winning 79.2% of the vote. The district is entirely based in Cuyahoga County and includes portions of Cleveland, Euclid, Beachwood, University Heights, South Euclid, and Lyndhurst.

Prior to his election to the Ohio House, he served on the Beachwood City Council.

== Early life and education ==
Synenberg was born in University Heights. He is Jewish. He earned his Juris Doctor degree from Cleveland State University. He formerly served as Deputy Counsel for the Ohio Treasurer and also earned a Bachelor of Arts degree from Miami University.
