= Ohio Bureau of Motor Vehicles =

Ohio Department of Public Safety agency

- Seal of the Ohio Bureau of Motor Vehicles

Department overview
- Formed: 1907; 119 years ago
- Preceding department: Automobile Division of the Ohio Secretary of State
- Jurisdiction: Ohio
- Headquarters: Charles D. Shipley Building; 1970 West Broad Street; Columbus, Ohio
- Department executive: Charles L. Norman, Registrar of Motor Vehicles
- Parent department: Ohio Department of Public Safety
- Website: www.bmv.ohio.gov

The Ohio Bureau of Motor Vehicles (abbreviated BMV) is an agency of the Ohio Department of Public Safety that registers motor vehicles and issues license plates and driver's licenses in the U.S. state of Ohio. It is headquartered in the state capital, Columbus, and operates deputy registrar's offices and driver exam stations throughout the state. The agency is administered by the Registrar of Motor Vehicles. As of 2019, there are 8,071,426 valid Ohio driver's licenses, 839,474 Ohio identification cards, and 13,285,303 registered vehicles in the state.

== History ==
On May 19, 1902, Cleveland became one of the first cities in the country to require motorists to display government-issued registration numbers on their vehicles.

In 1906, the state attempted to take over auto registration under the Ward Automobile Law, but litigation delayed the program until the state Supreme Court ruled in favor of the law. The Secretary of State's Automobile Division was established in 1907. The Ward Law went into effect on June 11, 1908, but the Automobile Division did not begin issuing plates for another 30 days due to a manufacturing defect. The first state vehicle registration was issued to Cincinnati resident Thomas B. Paxton, Jr., for his Franklin automobile. Locally issued and owner-provided license plates were phased out by 1909 for automobiles, but local plates continued to be used for motorcycles until 1914.

In 1925, the Automobile Division was renamed the Bureau of Motor Vehicles, and the Registrar of Motor Vehicles was retitled the Commissioner of Motor Vehicles. In 1933, the Bureau was transferred to the newly created Ohio Department of Highways. In 1935, the Commissioner title was reverted to Registrar. On May 19, 1953, Amended House Bill 243 created the Ohio Department of Highway Safety and transferred the Bureau of Motor Vehicles and State Highway Patrol to the new department, effective October 2, 1953. Deputy registrars were political appointees until November 28, 1988, when a private request for proposal process took effect. The BMV's parent agency was renamed the Department of Public Safety in September 1992.

The division allows for special license plates to be purchased by individuals which indicate if either the driver or passenger of a particular vehicle has a communication disability, to decrease the chance of negative interactions with police.

== See also ==
- Vehicle registration plates of Ohio
