= Jeffrey Crossman =

American politician

Member of the Ohio House of Representatives from the 15th district
- In office January 1, 2019 – December 31, 2022
- Preceded by: Nicholas J. Celebrezze
- Succeeded by: Sean Brennan

Personal details
- Born: February 21, 1972 (age 54)
- Party: Democratic
- Education: University of Mount Union (BA); University of Akron (MA); Cleveland State University (JD)

Jeffrey A. Crossman (born February 21, 1972) is an American attorney who served as a Member of the Ohio House of Representatives from the 15th District in Cuyahoga County. Crossman grew up in Wickliffe, Ohio and graduated from Wickliffe High School. Crossman previously served as a member of the Parma City Council. Crossman has travelled to El Salvador to volunteer with ASAPROSAR, a non-governmental organization that provides health, education, environment and economic development programs. As an attorney, he was one of the attorneys that brought a lawsuit against the state of Ohio to stop the state from taking unclaimed funds to build a new stadium for the Cleveland Browns.

Crossman was the Democratic nominee in the 2022 Ohio Attorney General election, losing to incumbent Dave Yost.

== Ohio House of Representatives ==
=== Election ===
After incumbent State Representative Nick Celebrezze unexpectedly announced that he would not run for reelection in the 15th District, Crossman, then a member of the Parma City Council, was selected to replace him on the ballot as the Democratic nominee. Crossman was elected in the general election on November 6, 2018, winning 56 percent of the vote over 44 percent of Republican candidate. In the 2020 election, Crossman was one of only a few Democratic candidates to win a Statehouse seat despite Donald Trump winning his Statehouse District.

=== Work in the Ohio House ===
During his time in the Ohio House, Crossman has served on the following committees: Civil Justice, Criminal Justice, Financial Institutions, Public Utilities, and Ways and Means. Crossman was also one of the key figures in removing former Ohio House Speaker Larry Householder after the Federal government indicted Householder for his role in securing a bailout for First Energy Corp. in exchange for millions of dollars in alleged bribes. As a result, Householder became the first member of the Ohio General Assembly to have been expelled since the Civil War.

== Election history ==
Ohio House 15th District
Year	Democrat	Votes	Pct	Republican	Votes	Pct
2018	Jeffrey Crossman	19,236	56.4%	Kevin Kussmaul	14,895	43.6%
2020	Jeffrey Crossman	24,020	52.2%	Kevin Kussmaul	22,018	47.8%

2022 Ohio Attorney General election
Party	Candidate	Votes	%	±%
Republican	Dave Yost (incumbent)	2,484,753	60.13%	+7.97
Democratic	Jeffrey Crossman	1,647,644	39.87%	−7.97
Total votes		4,132,397	100.00%	
Republican hold				

Party political offices
Preceded by Steve Dettelbach	Democratic nominee for Ohio Attorney General; 2022	Succeeded by John Kulewicz
