= Ohio's 21st House of Representatives district =

American legislative district

Ohio's 21st State House of Representatives district
Representative
Elliot Forhan; D–South Euclid
- Population (2020): 125,129

Ohio's 21st House of Representatives district is currently represented by Democrat Elliot Forhan. It is located entirely within Cuyahoga County and includes the municipalities of Beachwood, Euclid, Highland Heights, Lyndhurst, South Euclid, and part of Cleveland.

== List of members representing the district ==
Member	Party	Years	General Assembly	Electoral history
District established January 2, 1967.
Myrl Shoemaker (Bourneville)	Democratic	January 2, 1967 – December 31, 1972	107th 108th 109th	Elected in 1966. Re-elected in 1968. Re-elected in 1970. Redistricted to the 88th district.
Norman Murdock (Cincinnati)	Republican	January 1, 1973 – December 31, 1978	110th 111th 112th	Redistricted from the 70th district and re-elected in 1972. Re-elected in 1974. Re-elected in 1976. Retired to run for Hamilton County Commissioner.
Jerome F. Luebbers (Cincinnati)	Democratic	January 1, 1979 – December 31, 1992	113th 114th 115th 116th 117th 118th 119th	Elected in 1978. Re-elected in 1980. Re-elected in 1982. Re-elected in 1984. Re-elected in 1986. Re-elected in 1988. Re-elected in 1990. Redistricted to the 33rd district.
Otto Beatty Jr. (Columbus)	Democratic	January 4, 1993 – June 9, 1999	120th 121st 122nd 123rd	Redistricted from the 31st district and re-elected in 1992. Re-elected in 1994. Re-elected in 1996. Re-elected in 1998. Resigned.
Joyce Beatty (Columbus)	Democratic	June 9, 1999 – December 31, 2002	123rd 124th	Appointed to finish Beatty's term. Re-elected in 2000. Redistricted to the 27th district.
Linda Reidelbach (Columbus)	Republican	January 6, 2003 – December 31, 2006	125th 126th	Redistricted from the 26th district and re-elected in 2002. Re-elected in 2004. Retired.
Kevin Bacon (Minerva Park)	Republican	January 1, 2007 – December 31, 2010	127th 128th	Elected in 2006. Re-elected in 2008. Retired to run for state senator.
Mike Duffey (Worthington)	Republican	January 3, 2011 – December 31, 2018	129th 130th 131st 132nd	Elected in 2010. Re-elected in 2012. Re-elected in 2014. Re-elected in 2016. Term-limited.
Beth Liston (Dublin)	Democratic	January 7, 2019 – December 31, 2022	133rd 134th	Elected in 2018. Re-elected in 2020. Redistricted to the 8th district.
Elliot Forhan (South Euclid)	Democratic	January 2, 2023 – present	135th	Elected in 2022.
