= Larry Obhof =

American politician

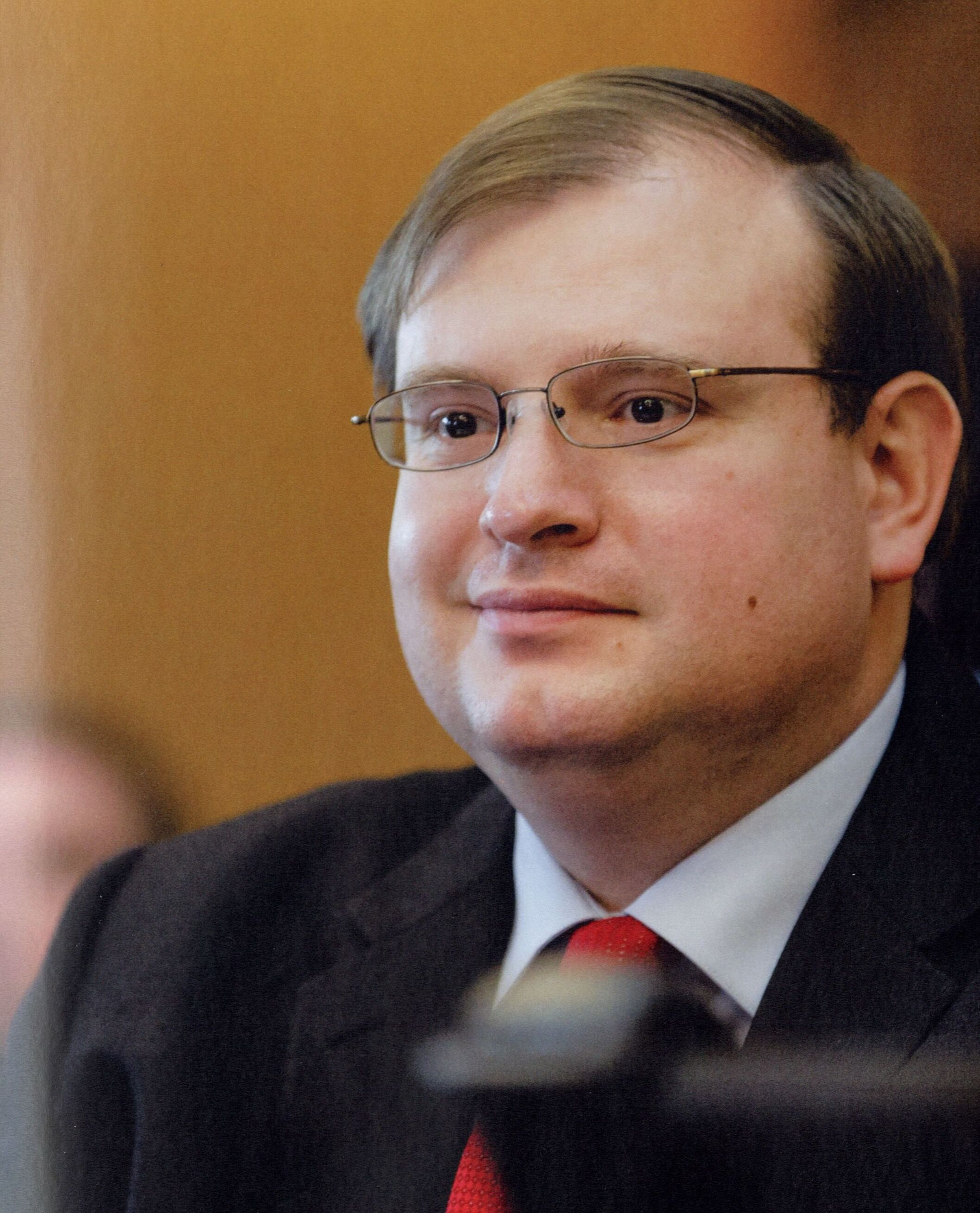

95th President of the Ohio Senate
- In office January 3, 2017 – December 31, 2020
- Preceded by: Keith Faber
- Succeeded by: Matt Huffman

Member of the Ohio Senate from the 22nd district
- In office February 1, 2011 – December 31, 2020
- Preceded by: Bob Gibbs
- Succeeded by: Mark Romanchuk

Personal details
- Born: November 26, 1977 (age 48) Ashtabula, Ohio, U.S.
- Party: Republican
- Education: Ohio State University, Columbus (BA); Yale University (JD)

Larry J. Obhof (born November 26, 1977) is an American attorney and politician, who served as a member of the Ohio Senate from 2011 to 2020. He also served as the President of the Senate from 2017 to 2020.

== Early life and education ==
Larry Obhof was born on November 26, 1977, in Ashtabula, Ohio. He received a bachelor's degree from The Ohio State University and a J.D. degree from Yale Law School.

== Career ==
Obhof is an attorney with the law firm Shumaker, Loop & Kendrick, LLP in Columbus, Ohio, where he practices complex civil litigation and appellate litigation. He has also taught as an adjunct law professor at Case Western Reserve University School of Law and has written about federalism and the separation of powers.

Obhof is a former board member of the Ohio Legal Assistance Foundation and the Ohio Criminal Sentencing Commission. He serves on the board of the Columbus chapter of the Federalist Society. His legal philosophy has been described as “textualist in the mold of former Supreme Court of the United States Justice Antonin Scalia.”

=== Ohio Senate ===
In early-2011, Obhof was appointed to fill a vacancy in the Ohio Senate created by Bob Gibbs' 2010 election to the United States House of Representatives. Obhof was one of eleven who sought the appointment to fill out the remainder of Gibbs' term. Obhof ran for a complete term for his seat in the 2012 general election, defeating James Riley with 60% of the vote. Obhof ran for re-election in 2016, defeating Janet Porter in the primary election with roughly 66% of the vote, and defeating Chris King in the general election with 70% of the vote.

==== Legislation ====
As a member of the Ohio Senate, Obhof has sponsored and supported legislation on a wide range of issues including education, civil and criminal law, election administration, and taxation. Among other accomplishments, Obhof sponsored the "Founding Documents Bill." The bill requires the study of historically significant documents, including the primary texts of the Declaration of Independence and the United States Constitution, as part of Ohio students' history and government curricula. Obhof has also passed legislation to modernize Ohio's elections system by using improved technologies such as electronic poll-books; to update Ohio's tax code and save taxpayers millions of dollars by protecting their ability to claim certain credits or deductions; to cut the filing fee for starting a new business by 21%; and to give state law enforcement greater ability to investigate and prosecute money laundering. In early 2018, Obhof was credited by activists and leaders in both major parties with negotiating a historic, bipartisan reform of Ohio's process for drawing Congressional districts.

The Cleveland Plain Dealer has noted that Obhof is "instrumental in passing key bills" and that he stands out "for notching legislative victories." Obhof's politics are decidedly conservative – on multiple occasions he has earned a perfect score in the American Conservative Union's state legislative rankings. However, Obhof has also earned "a reputation as a lawmaker with a willingness to work across party lines." He is currently a Rodel Fellow at the Aspen Institute, a program designed to bring greater civility to public discourse. For example, in June 2019 he secured a rare unanimous budget vote (33-0) for a biennial budget that included $700 million in tax cuts and expanded school choice programs.

==== Leadership and Senate Presidency ====
Obhof was selected by his colleagues to serve as Majority Whip for both the 130th General Assembly (2013–2014) and the 131st General Assembly (2015–2016). In early 2016, Obhof's colleagues elected him to serve as President Pro Tempore — the Senate's second-highest ranking position. He had previously served as the Senate’s President Pro Tempore and as Majority Whip.

Following his landslide 2016 re-election, Obhof's colleagues selected him to serve as Senate President, the presiding officer of the 33-member chamber. He is the youngest person to lead the Senate since the position of Senate President was created in 1979, and is the first Senate leader from Medina County since the 1860s. As the presiding officer of the 33-member Senate, Obhof is responsible for leading the Senate's Majority Caucus as it sets its policy agenda. He is also responsible for the formal organization of the chamber, including recognizing members in debate, preserving order and decorum, calling for votes and signing all acts. In his capacity as Senate President, Obhof has also served as chair of the Joint Legislative Ethics Committee and the non-partisan Legislative Service Commission. He also serves (by federal appointment) on the Intergovernmental Policy Advisory Committee on Trade (IGPAC), which provides advice to the U.S. Trade Representative on issues involving trade and development.

Under Obhof’s leadership, the Ohio Senate has strengthened its position relative to the other branches of government. Obhof has led the Senate to override gubernatorial vetoes on nine occasions, after only one veto override in the prior four decades. Discussing these overrides, Obhof told the press that the executive branch had taken on responsibilities that should belong to the legislature, and that “we are starting to take some of those back."

==== Awards and Other Recognition ====
During his time in the Senate, Obhof has received numerous honors or awards in recognition of his legislative efforts, including several "Legislator of the Year" awards. Among others, these include being named Watchdog of the Treasury by the United Conservatives of Ohio and a Friend of Agriculture by the Ohio Farm Bureau Federation. Obhof received the "Freedom Award" from the Ohio Christian Alliance in 2012, and he was named "Friend of the Family" by the Christian Coalition in 2016.

In 2014, Senator Obhof was named Legislator of the Year by the Public Children Services Association of Ohio, for his work on child protection issues. In 2017, Obhof received the "Lay the Groundwork" Award from Groundwork Ohio for his efforts on early childhood care and education issues.

Obhof was named Guardian of Small Business by the National Federation of Independent Business (in 2013) and received the Outstanding Legislator Award from the Ohio Society of CPAs (in 2015) in recognition of his efforts to improve Ohio's economy. Likewise, the Greater Cleveland Partnership (GCP) and its small business division, the Council of Smaller Enterprises (COSE), named Obhof their 2016 Small Business Advocate of the Year.

In 2018, Obhof received the Ohio Bar Association's Lawyer-Legislator Distinguished Service Award. Among other reasons, the Bar Association cited Obhof's work on a comprehensive update to the Ohio's general corporation law and its statutes governing LLCs, as well as his support for legal aid and indigent defense.

Obhof is a contributor to The Daily Caller, where he has written about a range of topics including judicial nominations, trade issues, health care and the Second Amendment.

== Personal life ==
Obhof is married, has three children, and lives in Montville Township, Medina County, Ohio.

Political offices
Preceded by Keith Faber	President of the Ohio Senate; 2017–2020	Succeeded by Matt Huffman
