= Vicky Guzmán =

Salvadoran doctor and humanitarian

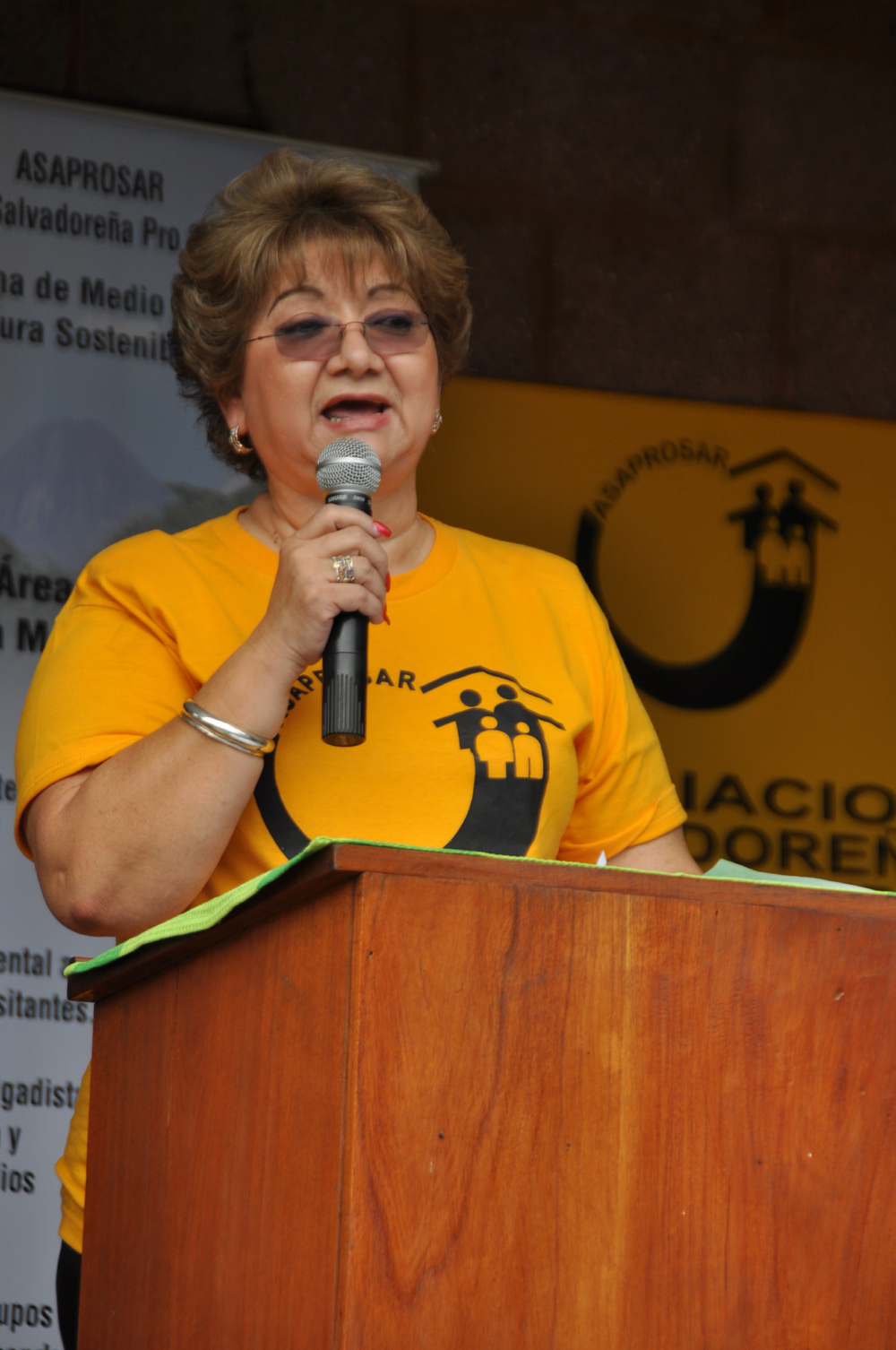
- Guzman Speaking at Ceremony at Magadalena National Forest, 2010
- Born: October 22, 1944 (age 81); Santa Ana, El Salvador
- Occupation: Executive Director of ASAPROSAR

Vicky Guzmán (born October 22, 1944) is a Salvadoran doctor and humanitarian from Santa Ana, El Salvador. After graduating from Universidad Michoacana de San Nicolás de Hidalgo in Mexico, Dr. Guzmán returned to her native El Salvador to provide health services and training in rural under-served areas. In particular, she focused on basic sanitation, disease prevention and training community health promoters. In August 1986, Dr. Guzmán legally founded the nonprofit organization ASAPROSAR (Asociación Salvadoreña Pro-Salud Rural - The Salvadoran Association for Rural Health) where she currently serves as executive director.

Guzmán has been recognized in El Salvador and the United States for her humanitarian work including an honorary doctorate in law from the College of the Holy Cross and the Salem Award for Human Rights and Social Justice. In the 1990s, Dr. Guzmán served as Director for Habitat for Humanity International in El Salvador and she is currently on the Board of Directors for Results.
