= 2022 Ohio Attorney General election =

- November 8, 2022
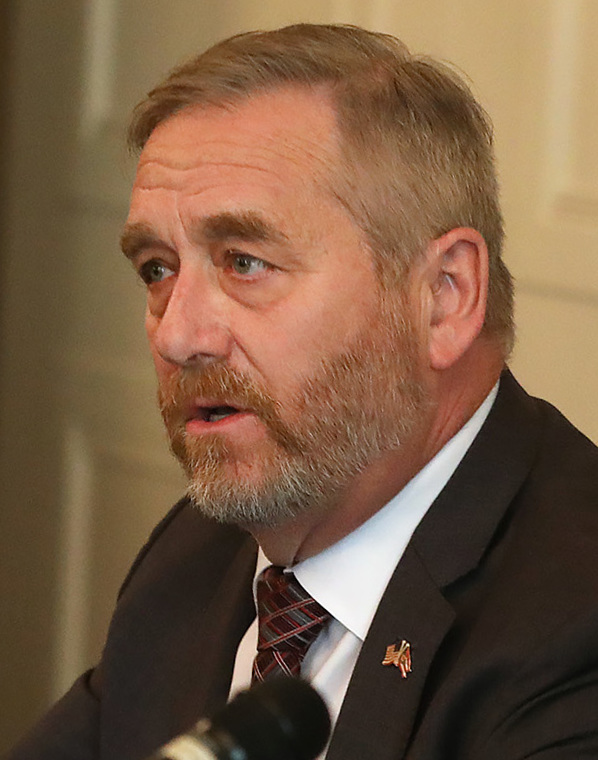

Nominee	Dave Yost	Jeffrey Crossman
Party	Republican	Democratic
Popular vote	2,484,753	1,647,644
Percentage	60.13%	39.87%
- Yost: 50–60% 60–70% 70–80% 80–90% >90% Crossman: 50–60% 60–70% 70–80% 80–90% >90% Tie: 50% No votes
Attorney General before election
Dave Yost
Republican
Elected Attorney General
Dave Yost
Republican

The 2022 Ohio Attorney General election took place on November 8, 2022, to elect the Attorney General of the state of Ohio. David Yost was re-elected to a second term in a landslide, defeating Democratic opponent Jeffrey Crossman by a comfortable 20 percentage points. The election coincided with various other federal and state elections, including that for governor of Ohio.

== Republican primary ==
=== Candidates ===
==== Nominee ====
- Dave Yost, incumbent attorney general

=== Endorsements ===
Dave Yost

U.S. Executive Branch officials

- Donald Trump, 45th President of the United States (2017–2021)

Organizations

- Ohio Republican Party

=== Results ===
Republican primary results
Party	Candidate	Votes	%
Republican	Dave Yost (incumbent)	870,124	100.00
Total votes		870,124	100.00

== Democratic primary ==
=== Candidates ===
==== Nominee ====
- Jeffrey Crossman, state representative from the 15th district

=== Endorsements ===
Jeffrey Crossman

Organizations

- Ohio Democratic Party
- Young Democrats of Portage County

=== Results ===
Democratic primary results
Party	Candidate	Votes	%
Democratic	Jeffrey Crossman	433,014	100.00
Total votes		433,014	100.00

== General election ==
=== Predictions ===
Source	Ranking	As of
Sabato's Crystal Ball	Safe R	September 14, 2022
Elections Daily	Safe R	November 1, 2022

=== Post-primary endorsements ===
Dave Yost (R)

Organizations

- American Conservative Union
- NFIB Ohio PAC

Newspapers

- The Plain Dealer

=== Polling ===
Graphical summary

Poll source	Date(s) administered	Sample size	Margin of error	Dave Yost (R)	Jeffrey Crossman (D)	Other	Undecided
The Trafalgar Group	August 16–18, 2022	1,087 (LV)	± 2.9%	53%	37%		10%

=== Results ===
State Senate district results

State House district results

2022 Ohio Attorney General election
Party	Candidate	Votes	%	±%
Republican	Dave Yost (incumbent)	2,484,753	60.13%	+7.97
Democratic	Jeffrey Crossman	1,647,644	39.87%	−7.97
Total votes		4,132,397	100.00%	
Republican hold				

==== By congressional district ====
Yost won 13 of 15 congressional districts, including three that elected Democrats.

District	Yost	Crossman	Representative
1st	52%	48%	Steve Chabot (117th Congress)
1st	52%	48%	Greg Landsman (118th Congress)
2nd	76%	24%	Brad Wenstrup
3rd	35%	65%	Joyce Beatty
4th	73%	27%	Jim Jordan
5th	69%	31%	Bob Latta
6th	70%	30%	Bill Johnson
7th	60%	40%	Bob Gibbs (117th Congress)
7th	60%	40%	Max Miller (118th Congress)
8th	67%	33%	Warren Davidson
9th	58%	42%	Marcy Kaptur
10th	59%	41%	Mike Turner
11th	27%	73%	Shontel Brown
12th	71%	29%	Troy Balderson
13th	55%	45%	Tim Ryan (117th Congress)
13th	55%	45%	Emilia Sykes (118th Congress)
14th	63%	37%	David Joyce
15th	60%	40%	Mike Carey
