= Marietta Memorial Hospital Employee Health Benefit Plan v. DaVita Inc. =

- Supreme Court of the United States

Decided June 21, 2022
- Full case name: Marietta Memorial Hospital Employee Health Benefit Plan v. DaVita Inc.
- Docket no.: 20-1641
- Citations: 596 U.S. 880 (more)

Holding
- The Medicare Secondary Payer statute does not authorize disparate-impact liability, and the Marietta Plan’s coverage terms for outpatient dialysis were lawful because those terms applied uniformly to all covered individuals.

Court membership
- Chief Justice John Roberts Associate Justices Clarence Thomas · Stephen Breyer; Samuel Alito · Sonia Sotomayor; Elena Kagan · Neil Gorsuch; Brett Kavanaugh · Amy Coney Barrett

Case opinions
- Majority: Kavanaugh
- Dissent: Kagan, joined by Sotomayor

Marietta Memorial Hospital Employee Health Benefit Plan v. DaVita Inc., 596 U.S. 880 (2022), was a United States Supreme Court case in which the Court held that the Medicare Secondary Payer statute does not authorize disparate-impact liability, and the Marietta Plan's coverage terms for outpatient dialysis were lawful because those terms applied uniformly to all covered individuals.

John Kulewicz of the law firm Vorys represented the hospital, the petitioners in the case.
