= Elliot Forhan =

American politician (born 1985)

Member of the Ohio House of Representatives from the 21st district
- In office January 1, 2023 – December 31, 2024
- Preceded by: Kent Smith
- Succeeded by: Eric Synenberg

Personal details
- Born: November 16, 1985 (age 40) Athens, Ohio, U.S.
- Party: Democratic
- Education: Kenyon College (BA); Yale University (JD)
- Website: Campaign website

Elliot Forhan (born November 16, 1985) is an American attorney and non-profit executive who served in the Ohio House of Representatives during the 135th General Assembly (2023–2024). He represented the 21st district in Cuyahoga County.

== Early life and education ==
After graduating from high school, Forhan earned an undergraduate degree in 2008 from Kenyon College in Gambier, Ohio. He then attended Yale Law School, where he earned a JD in 2013.

== Career ==
Until leaving to work for the Joe Biden 2020 presidential campaign, Forhan worked as an attorney in the Cleveland office of BakerHostetler. He had previously worked for Governor Ted Strickland and State Treasurer Richard Cordray. In addition to his current law practice, which he operates as a solo practitioner, Forhan serves as general counsel for a non-profit organization focused on patent law. On February 27, 2025, Forhan announced his intention to run for Ohio Attorney General in 2026. He was defeated in the May 5th Democratic primary by John Kulewicz, a Upper Arlington city councilor.

== Ohio House of Representatives ==
=== Election ===
Forhan was elected in the general election on November 8, 2022, winning 73% of the vote over Republican candidate Kelly Powell.

On March 19, 2024, Forhan came in third place behind Eric Synenberg and Angel Washington for the Democratic primary election. He received 12% of the total vote.

=== Controversies ===
In June 2023, Forhan came to the home of Representative Juanita Brent unannounced with the stated purpose of discussing complaints levied against him to House Democratic leadership by local labor groups. Brent characterized the visit as "inappropriate" and "upsetting." Following this incident, Forhan was removed from his position as ranking member of the House Government Oversight Committee. Brent also filed a civil protection order against Forhan. On November 16, 2023, House Minority Leader Allison Russo announced that she was stripping Forhan of his committee assignments and access to House Democratic caucus staff for displaying a "continued pattern of harassment, hostility, and intimidation of colleagues and staff." This decision was made following a confrontation with Representative Munira Abdullahi over a video that Forhan had posted online regarding a request from caucus staff to remove an Israeli flag that he had placed outside of his office door.

On November 20, 2023, House Speaker Jason Stephens announced that he was suspending Forhan's badge access to the Ohio Statehouse and the Vern Riffe Center, where the offices of state representatives are located. Dave Yost, the Ohio Attorney General, appointed a special counsel to investigate Forhan's behavior at Stephens's request. The Ohio Attorney General found the legislature's punishment to be appropriate. In April 2024, the Cuyahoga County Court of Common Pleas found that Brent failed to prove that Forhan knowingly engaged in a pattern of conduct that caused her to believe that she would be physically harmed or caused mental distress.

On September 15, 2025, Forhan posted an image on his personal Facebook page with a red background and the words "F*** Charlie Kirk", who was assassinated five days before the post was made. Forhan’s social media posts have prompted significant pushback, both on the internet and from Republicans in the state, with many calling on him to withdraw from the race for Ohio Attorney General.

On January 27, 2026, Forhan stated, "I am going to kill Donald Trump." Specifying that, if elected as the Ohio Attorney General, he would prosecute US President Donald Trump for treason and seek capital punishment.

== Personal life ==
Forhan is the son of two women whose wedding he officiated after the Obergefell v. Hodges Supreme Court decision legalizing same-sex marriage.

== Election results ==
Ohio House 21st District
Year	Democrat	Votes	Pct	Republican	Votes	Pct
2022	Elliot Forhan	28,311	73.4%	Kelly Powell	10,260	26.6%
