= Dave Yost =

American politician and lawyer (born 1956)

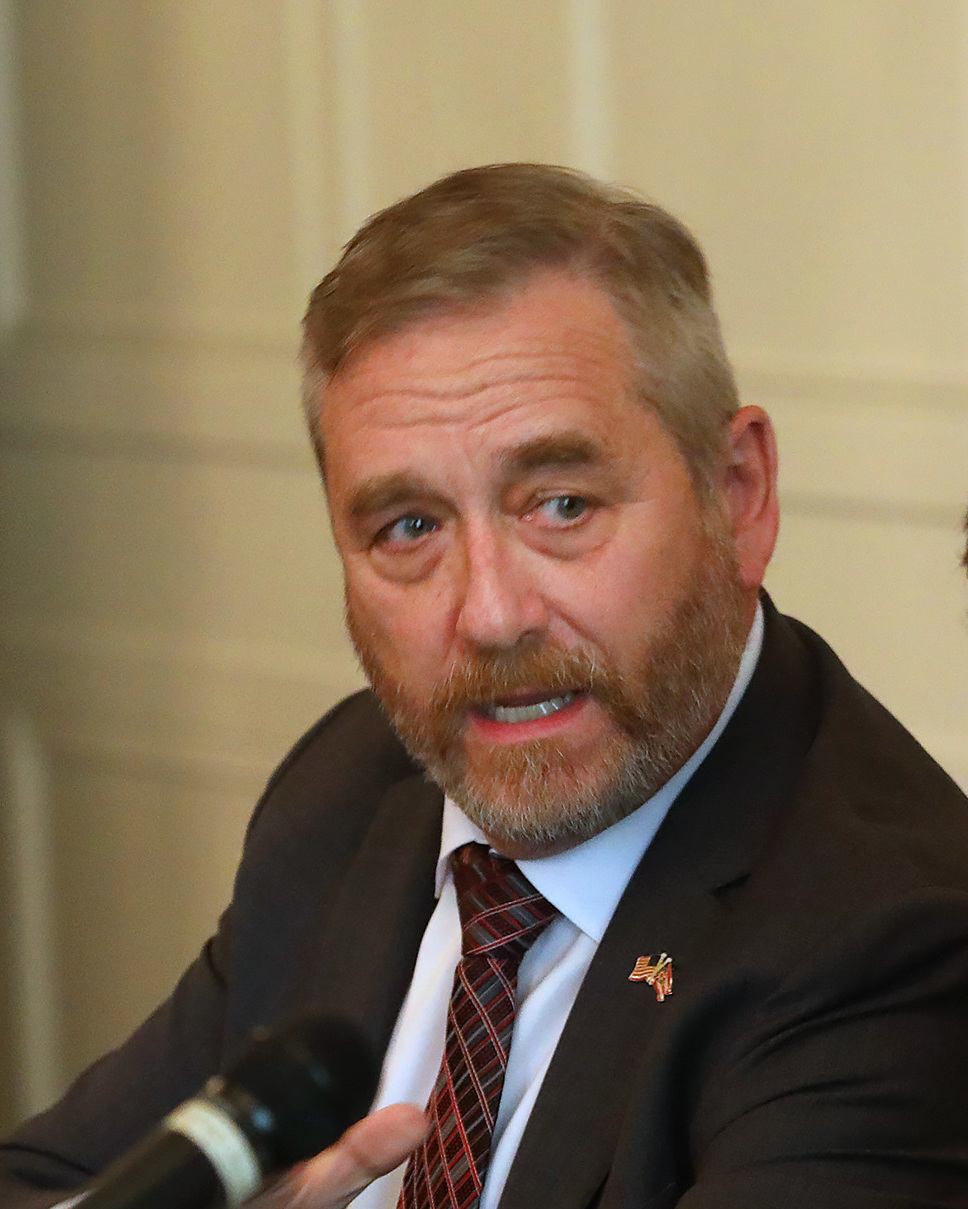
- Yost in 2019

51st Attorney General of Ohio
- In office January 14, 2019 – June 7, 2026
- Governor: Mike DeWine
- Preceded by: Mike DeWine
- Succeeded by: Andy Wilson

32nd Auditor of Ohio
- In office January 10, 2011 – January 12, 2019
- Governor: John Kasich
- Preceded by: Mary Taylor
- Succeeded by: Keith Faber

Personal details
- Born: David Anthony Yost; December 22, 1956 (age 69)
- Party: Republican
- Spouse: Darlene Yost
- Children: 3
- Education: Ohio State University (BA); Capital University (JD)
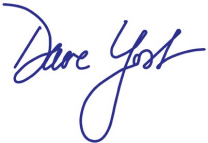
- Signature

David Anthony Yost (born December 22, 1956) is an American politician and lawyer who served as the 51st attorney general of Ohio from 2019 until 2026. A member of the Republican Party, Yost previously served as the state auditor of Ohio from 2011 to 2019.

During his tenure as attorney general, he sued President Joe Biden over his OSHA vaccine mandate, winning a U.S. Supreme Court order invalidating the rule. He has taken controversial positions regarding abortion, transgender rights, and the power of the federal government. He was unanimously elected as President of the National Association of Attorneys General in 2023.

Yost resigned as attorney general, effective June 7, 2026, to join Alliance Defending Freedom, a conservative Christian legal advocacy group. Andy Wilson, Ohio's Public Safety Director, succeeded him as attorney general.

== Early life and education ==
Yost graduated from Ohio State University with a Bachelor of Arts degree in journalism. He earned a Juris Doctor from the Capital University Law School. After earning his bachelor's degree, Yost became a journalist with the Columbus Citizen-Journal.

== Political career ==
Yost later served in senior positions within the administration of Columbus mayor Buck Rinehart and governor George Voinovich. Yost was appointed Delaware County Auditor in 1999. In 2003, he became the Delaware County Prosecutor. He was the prosecutor in the capital murder case of Gerald Robert Hand, Delaware County's first death row case since 1987. He was elected Ohio's 32nd state auditor in November 2010, after earlier vying for the Republican nomination for Ohio attorney general against Mike DeWine. In January 2017, Yost announced he was running for Ohio Attorney General in 2018.

== House Bill 6 scandal ==
House Bill 6, a 2019 energy law that provided subsidies for two nuclear plants and certain coal facilities, became the subject of what federal prosecutors described as the largest bribery case in Ohio history, involving former House Speaker Larry Householder, FirstEnergy Corp., and associated entities. In 2019, Yost approved ballot summary language for a proposed referendum backed by opponents of HB 6, allowing petitioners to begin collecting signatures to try to overturn the law.

After federal charges were announced in 2020, Yost filed a lawsuit in Franklin County Common Pleas Court seeking to block collection of nuclear bailout fees from ratepayers and to prevent the owner of the plants from receiving subsidies under HB 6. In a 2021 news release, his office said those efforts to halt and roll back HB 6-related charges had “systematically derail[ed] the corruption embedded in House Bill 6” and estimated the actions would save Ohioans nearly $2 billion over the life of the law. In 2024, Yost announced state felony indictments against former Ohio House Speaker Larry Householder, former Public Utilities Commission of Ohio chair Sam Randazzo, and former FirstEnergy executives Charles “Chuck” Jones and Michael Dowling in connection with the HB 6 scheme.

Yost’s handling of HB 6 has also drawn criticism. During the 2023 federal racketeering trial of Householder and lobbyist Matt Borges, text messages introduced by prosecutors showed Borges telling another lobbyist that Yost privately regarded the proposed bailout as a bad bill but did not publicly oppose it because of support he had received from FirstEnergy, the law’s main corporate beneficiary. In October 2020, Yost said he would donate $24,208 in campaign contributions from FirstEnergy and Borges to charity following the federal HB 6 arrests. In later coverage of state-level HB 6 prosecutions, Yost declined to answer detailed questions from reporters about what he knew regarding the dark-money operation or what assistance he may have provided to Borges, citing ongoing cases; commentators noted that his office had previously acknowledged he was identified as a possible witness in HB 6 proceedings. He was never called as a witness.

== Ohio Attorney General (2019-2026) ==
Yost defeated his Democratic opponent Steve Dettelbach, who previously served as the United States attorney for the Northern District of Ohio, in the 2018 Ohio Attorney General election. In the 2022 election, Yost was re-elected to his position over Democratic candidate Jeffrey Crossman, a member of the Ohio House from Parma. On May 7, 2026, Yost announced that he would resign as Ohio Attorney General effective June 7, 2026, to join the Alliance Defending Freedom as vice president of Strategic Research and Innovation.

=== Abortion ban ===
Following the Dobbs v. Jackson Women's Health Organization decision that overturned Roe v. Wade, Yost filed a successful motion to dissolve the injunction on Ohio's six-week abortion ban. On June 24, 2022, Yost tweeted that "The Heartbeat Bill is now the law." He released a video statement on YouTube the same day in which he said, "This decision returns abortion policy to the place it has always belonged: to the elected policies branches of the governments."

Yost's son and daughter-in-law publicly criticized the Supreme Court decision in messages on Facebook on June 24 and 25, the former saying, "[T]he lack of pro choice is blatantly against what this country says it is on its banners and documents. The land of the free doesn't seem so free right now."

On June 30, 2022, shortly after the ban became effective, a 10-year-old rape victim who was "six weeks and three days" pregnant traveled from the Columbus area to Indianapolis, Indiana, to get an abortion to avoid carrying her rapist's child. The incident was widely reported, beginning with an article in the Indianapolis Star newspaper on July 1, and was mentioned by President Joe Biden on July 8 in comments at the White House. On July 11, Yost disputed the report, saying that neither his office or the state crime lab had any information on the matter, and that his staff had heard "not a whisper" about it; in an interview on July 12, Yost said it was "more likely that this is a fabrication". Later that day, the report was confirmed by the Columbus Division of Police and a rape suspect was arrested.

On July 14, Yost's office shared a backgrounder with media and on Twitter which listed specific exceptions contained in Ohio's "Heartbeat Law", and suggested, as had Yost in interviews on July 11, that the 10-year-old girl would have been able to obtain a legal abortion under those exceptions. The Ohio Legislative Commission said that nothing in the language of the law explicitly includes the age of the person seeking an abortion as a qualification for exception, and that it was unclear whether the girl would have qualified for a legal abortion. The following week, Yost rejected calls from the chairman of the Ohio Democratic Party and others for his resignation.

=== Attempt to invalidate 2020 presidential election results ===
In December 2020, Yost filed an amicus curiae brief in the U.S. Supreme Court case Texas v. Pennsylvania. Rather than supporting Texas's attempt to overturn the election, Ohio argued that the Supreme Court lacked the constitutional authority to order state legislatures to appoint a new slate of electors, but urged the Court to definitively rule on the Electors Clause to prevent future election administration issues.

=== Death Penalty ===
Yost supports the Death Penalty, In 2024 Yost supported moves to add nitrogen gas as a new method of execution aside from lethal injection.

=== 2023 East Palestine train derailment ===
In mid-March 2023, about five weeks after the train derailment in East Palestine, Ohio, Yost announced a 58-count civil damages lawsuit against Norfolk Southern for its "glaring negligence" and prioritizing profits over communities' safety. Although the federal government and the plaintiffs settled their cases, Yost had not joined the settlement and the litigation remained ongoing as of March 2026.

=== Human trafficking operations ===
In January 2025, Yost announced a new partnership between Truckers Against Trafficking and TravelCenters of America to train truck drivers to identify and report human trafficking. In May that year, during an ongoing investigation run by Yost's office, eight women were charged with operating a human trafficking ring in illicit massage parlors. A few months later, in September, Yost announced that 135 individuals in Ohio seeking to buy sex were arrested in a statewide human trafficking operation called Operation Next Door. At the end of 2025, Yost said he had doubled the number of Human Trafficking Task Forces in Ohio.

=== Social media antitrust investigation ===
In September 2019, Yost was one out of nine state attorneys general that launched an antitrust investigation into Facebook and Google, to investigate whether or not they were stifling competition in their respective fields.

=== Voting laws ===
Yost was sued by a coalition of civil rights groups, including the A. Philip Randolph Institute, the state NAACP chapter, and the Ohio Organizing Collaborative, in February 2024 after his second rejection of a petition for a proposed constitutional amendment, entitled the Ohio Voters Bill of Rights, that would appear on the ballot in the 2024 elections. The amendment would introduce the automatic registration of voters, discard recent additions to voter identification requirements, and increase ballot drop boxes. After rejecting the first petition in December 2023, Yost's office rejected it for a second time the following month, finding that the amendment's title was "highly misleading and misrepresentative" of its content. Yost later approved the measure after the state Supreme Court ruled that the title was not part of the statutory analysis.

=== Refusal to permit Joe Biden on the 2024 ballot ===
In April 2024, Yost's office said that provisional approval wouldn't work to get President Joe Biden on the November ballot before the Democratic National Convention, which was scheduled to take place after the state certification deadline. Later, a bill was passed ensuring Biden would appear on the ballot.

=== Pro-Palestinian campus protests response ===
After the Gaza Solidarity Encampment, Yost wrote a letter to the presidents of 14 public, four-year universities in Ohio—including Ohio State University—advising them to "warn" students about an anti-Ku Klux Klan law passed in 1953, which could be used to prosecute students who commit misdemeanors while wearing face coverings (including COVID-19 masks) with felony charges.

Yost's letter also urged compliance with Ohio's anti-BDS statute, Ohio Revised Code § 9.76, reminding presidents that state agencies—including public universities—are barred from boycotting Israel or contracting with companies that boycott Israel.

=== Threats and harassment ===
Yost and Republican lawmaker Kevin D. Miller were the targets of swatting phone calls in December 2023 after false reports of shootings at their homes were made to the police. The following year, Yost received threatening letters in the mail with suspicious white powder and a bullet etched with his name. In May 2025, a man was accused in connection with the crimes and in April 2026, he pleaded guilty.

== 2026 Ohio gubernatorial campaign ==
On January 23, 2025, Yost announced that he would run for governor of Ohio in the 2026 election, seeking to succeed term-limited governor Mike DeWine. In May 2025, after the Ohio Republican Party endorsed Vivek Ramaswamy, Yost withdrew from the race.

== Personal life ==
Yost and his wife Darlene live in Franklin County, Ohio. They have three children and six grandchildren.

== Electoral history ==
Ohio Auditor Republican Primary Election, 2010
Party	Candidate	Votes	%
Republican	Dave Yost	457,820	64.88
Republican	Seth Morgan	247,848	35.12

Ohio Auditor Election, 2010
Party	Candidate	Votes	%
Republican	Dave Yost	1,882,010	50.22
Democratic	David Pepper	1,683,330	44.91
Libertarian	Michael Howard	182,534	4.87

Ohio Auditor Election, 2014
Party	Candidate	Votes	%
Republican	Dave Yost (incumbent)	1,711,927	56.98
Democratic	John Patrick Carney	1,149,305	38.25
Libertarian	Bob Bridges	143,363	4.77

Ohio Attorney General Election, 2018
Party	Candidate	Votes	%
Republican	Dave Yost	2,272,440	52.16
Democratic	Steve Dettelbach	2,084,593	47.84

Ohio Attorney General Election, 2022
Party	Candidate	Votes	%
Republican	Dave Yost (incumbent)	2,484,753	60.1
Democratic	Jeffrey Crossman	1,647,644	39.9

Party political offices
Preceded by Mary Taylor	Republican nominee for Auditor of Ohio; 2010, 2014	Succeeded by Keith Faber
Preceded by Mike DeWine	Republican nominee for Attorney General of Ohio; 2018, 2022	Succeeded by Keith Faber
Political offices
Preceded by Mary Taylor	Auditor of Ohio; 2011–2019	Succeeded by Keith Faber
Legal offices
Preceded by Mike DeWine	Attorney General of Ohio; 2019–2026	Succeeded by Andy Wilson
