= ASAPROSAR =

Salvadoran non-governmental medical organization

- Founded: 1986
- Founder: Dr. Vicky Guzmán
- Legal status: Non-profit organization
- Purpose: Development
- Region served: El Salvador
- Website: ASAPROSAR

ASAPROSAR (Asociación Salvadoreña Pro-Salud Rural - The Salvadoran Association for Rural Health) is a non-governmental organization that provides health, education, environment and economic development programs in El Salvador.

== History ==
ASAPROSAR was founded in 1986 by Dr. Vicky Guzmán. The organization developed out of Dr. Guzmán's work providing health services and training to rural communities in her native El Salvador in the 1970s. Founded during the Salvadoran Civil War, ASAPROSAR continued Dr. Guzman's work providing health services to the rural poor. In the 1990s, ASAPROSAR developed a post conflict resolution program that sought to help reintegrate ex-combatants from the civil war into society.

Headquartered in Santa Ana, El Salvador, ASAPROSAR has over 200 local employees in the education, health and social work fields. ASAPROSAR also has staff and volunteers based in the United States. Today, ASAPROSAR serves more than 150,000 people in El Salvador.

== Programs ==
- Community Health: Focuses on preventive medicine, basic sanitation as well as HIV/AIDS education and prevention.
- Visual Health: A permanent clinic in Santa Ana and a mobile eye unit provide eye exams, glasses and surgery to low-income families at subsidized rates. Annually, doctors and nurses from the United States volunteer their services with ASAPROSAR in El Salvador.
- Children and Youth: ASAPROSAR has developed two education programs, a rural preschool program and an urban youth program. "Sprouts of Hope" is a rural preschool program that provides a nutritious lunch and engages both parents and children in understanding the importance of education, good nutrition and sanitation. "Barefoot Angels" is an Urban Youth Program that focuses on reducing child labor and school drop-out for kids between 7 and 18 years old. Tutoring, computer training, language classes, health education and recreational activities are integral parts of the curriculum.
- Microcredit: ASAPROSAR has implemented two microcredit programs. The Rural Microcredit program is based on the Grameen Bank model and only women are eligible to form groups and receive loans to develop small businesses. The Urban-Micro Enterprise program supports small business loans for entrepreneurs.
- Environment: ASAPROSAR supports and manages La Magdalena forest reserve as well as educating children and local communities about the environment and sustainability.
