= Andy Wilson (politician) =

American attorney and politician (born 1974/1975

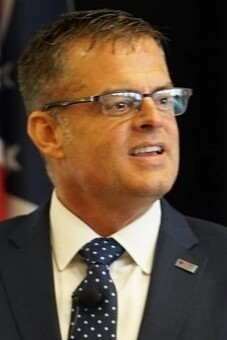
- Wilson in 2024

52nd Attorney General of Ohio
- Incumbent
- Assumed office June 7, 2026
- Governor: Mike DeWine
- Preceded by: Dave Yost

Director of the Ohio Department of Public Safety
- In office December 2022 – June 7, 2026
- Governor: Mike DeWine
- Preceded by: Tom Stickrath
- Succeeded by: Benjamin Suver (interim)

Prosecutor of Clark County
- In office January 2011 – January 2019
- Preceded by: Stephen Schumaker
- Succeeded by: Daniel Driscoll

Personal details
- Born: David Andrew Wilson; 1974 or 1975 (age 51–52)
- Party: Republican
- Spouse: Libby Wilson
- Children: 2
- Education: Wright State University (BA); University of Dayton (JD)

David Andrew Wilson (born 1974/1975) is an American attorney who is serving as the Attorney General of Ohio since June 2026. He previously served as the Director of Ohio Department of Public Safety from December 2022 until he became Attorney General in June 2026.

== Early life and career ==
Wilson graduated from Kenton Ridge High School in Springfield, Ohio. He served in the Army National Guard before earning his bachelor's degree from Wright State University and his Juris Doctor from the University of Dayton School of Law.

Wilson became an assistant prosecutor in Clark County in 2002. He served as Clark County Prosecutor from 2011 to 2019. In 2019, he became the senior advisor for criminal justice policy for Governor Mike DeWine. DeWine nominated him to serve as director of the Ohio Department of Public Safety in December 2022. Wilson succeeded Dave Yost as state attorney general following his resignation on June 7, 2026.

== Attorney General of Ohio (2026-present) ==
On August 10, 2026, Wilson would seek to lead a class-action lawsuit against Roblox. Wilson stated that Roblox lied to investors and failed to guard kids from online predators. The deception would cause the Ohio Public Employees Retirement System and the State Teachers Retirement System to lose US$12,500,000 from investment.

Legal offices
Preceded by Dave Yost	Attorney General of Ohio; 2026–present	Incumbent
