= Ohio Department of Public Safety =

Department of Public Safety

Department overview
- Headquarters: Charles D. Shipley Building; 1970 West Broad Street; Columbus, Ohio
- Department executive: Benjamin Suver, Interim Director of Public Safety
- Website: publicsafety.ohio.gov

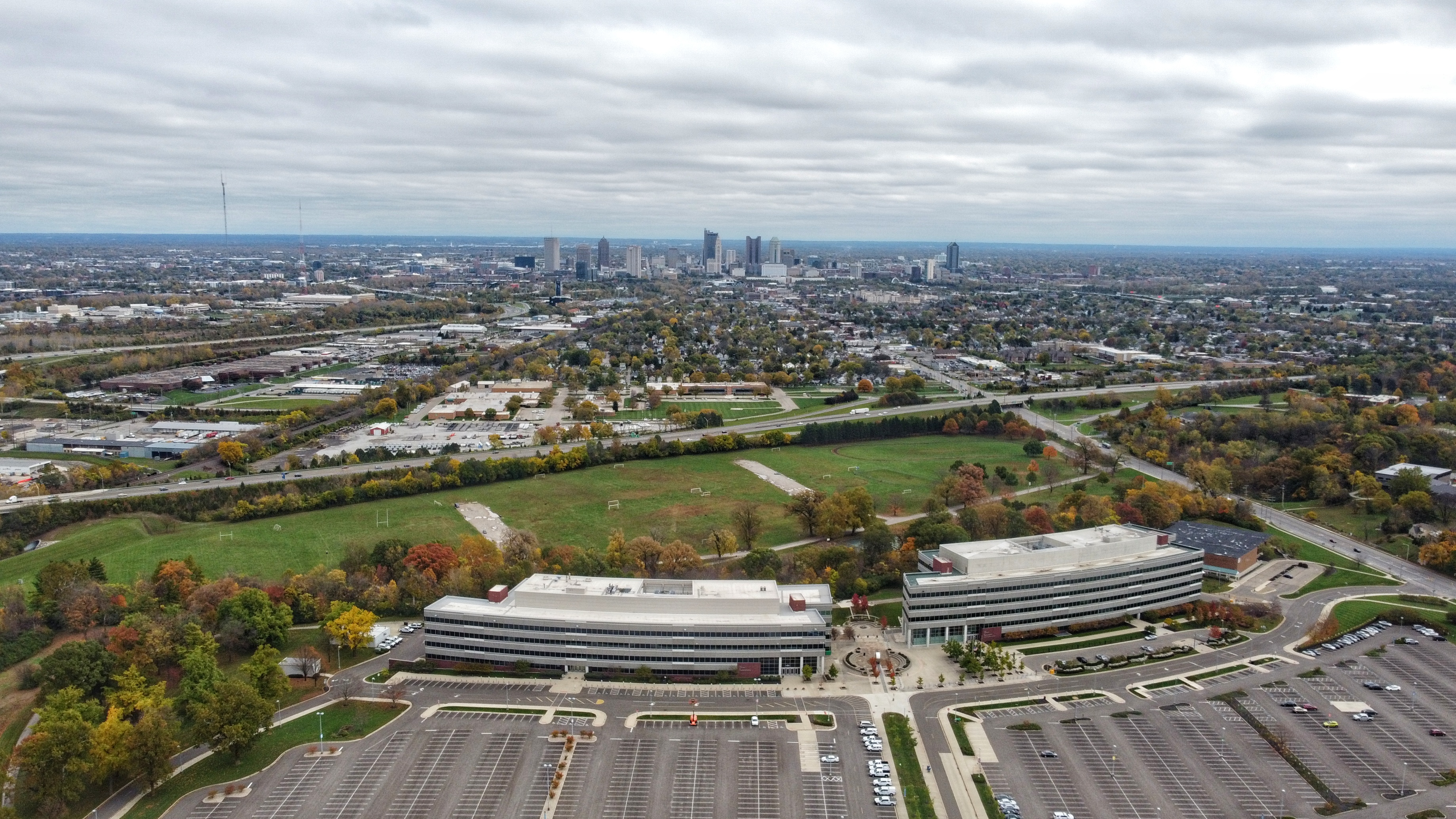
The ODPS and ODOT campus in Columbus's Hilltop neighborhood

The Ohio Department of Public Safety (ODPS) is the administrative department of the Ohio state government responsible for the protection and safety of residents and visitors. The Department of Public Safety's headquarters is located in Columbus, Ohio.

== History ==
On May 19, 1953, Amended House Bill 243 created the Ohio Department of Highway Safety, consisting of the Ohio Bureau of Motor Vehicles and Ohio State Highway Patrol, effective October 2, 1953. On September 24, 1992, the department was renamed the Ohio Department of Public Safety.

== Divisions ==
- Ohio School Safety Center
- Ohio Bureau of Motor Vehicles
- Ohio Emergency Management Agency
- Emergency Medical Services
- Office of Criminal Justice Services
- Ohio Office of Homeland Security
- Ohio State Highway Patrol
- Ohio Investigative Unit

== See also ==
- List of law enforcement agencies in Ohio
