= 2022 United States House of Representatives elections in Ohio =

- November 8, 2022

All 15 Ohio seats to the United States House of Representatives
| | Majority party | Minority party |
|---|---|---|
| Party | Republican | Democratic |
| Last election | 12 | 4 |
| Seats won | 10 | 5 |
| Seat change | ▼2 | ▲1 |
| Popular vote | 2,318,993 | 1,790,614 |
| Percentage | 56.43% | 43.57% |
| Swing | ▼0.03% | ▲1.02% |

Republican
50–60%
60–70%
70–80%
80–90%
Democratic
50–60%
60–70%
70–80%

The 2022 United States House of Representatives elections in Ohio were held on November 8, 2022, to elect the 15 U.S. representatives from Ohio, one from each of the state's 15 congressional districts. The elections coincided with other elections to the House of Representatives, other elections to the United States Senate, and various state and local elections. Primary elections were held on May 3, 2022.

== Results summary ==
=== Statewide ===
| Party | Candi- dates | Votes | | Seats | | |
| Party | Candi- dates | No. | % | No. | +/– | % |
|---|---|---|---|---|---|---|
| Republican Party | 15 | 2,318,993 | 56.43% | 10 | Steady | 66.67% |
| Democratic Party | 15 | 1,790,614 | 43.57% | 5 | Steady | 33.33% |
| Write-in | 2 | 104 | 0.00% | | Steady | 0.00% |
| Total | 43 | 4,109,711 | 100.00% | 15 | Steady | 100.00% |

Popular vote
| Republican | 56.43% |
| Democratic | 43.57% |
| Other | 0.0% |

House seats
| Republican | 66.67% |
| Democratic | 33.33% |

=== District ===
Results of the 2022 United States House of Representatives elections in Ohio by district:

| District | Republican | | Democratic | | Others | | Total | | Result |
| District | Votes | % | Votes | % | Votes | % | Votes | % | Result |
|---|---|---|---|---|---|---|---|---|---|
| District 1 | 140,058 | 47.24% | 156,416 | 52.76% | 0 | 0.00% | 296,474 | 100.00% | Democratic gain |
| District 2 | 192,117 | 74.50% | 65,745 | 25.50% | 0 | 0.00% | 257,862 | 100.00% | Republican hold |
| District 3 | 76,455 | 29.54% | 182,324 | 70.45% | 18 | 0.01% | 258,797 | 100.00% | Democratic hold |
| District 4 | 200,773 | 69.19% | 89,383 | 30.81% | 0 | 0.00% | 290,156 | 100.00% | Republican hold |
| District 5 | 187,303 | 66.91% | 92,634 | 33.09% | 0 | 0.00% | 279,937 | 100.00% | Republican hold |
| District 6 | 189,883 | 67.72% | 90,500 | 32.28% | 0 | 0.00% | 280,383 | 100.00% | Republican hold |
| District 7 | 168,002 | 55.34% | 135,485 | 44.63% | 86 | 0.03% | 303,573 | 100.00% | Republican hold |
| District 8 | 180,287 | 64.64% | 98,629 | 35.36% | 0 | 0.00% | 278,916 | 100.00% | Republican hold |
| District 9 | 115,362 | 43.37% | 150,655 | 56.63% | 0 | 0.00% | 266,017 | 100.00% | Democratic hold |
| District 10 | 168,327 | 61.67% | 104,634 | 38.33% | 0 | 0.00% | 272,961 | 100.00% | Republican hold |
| District 11 | 47,988 | 22.25% | 167,722 | 77.75% | 0 | 0.00% | 215,710 | 100.00% | Democratic hold |
| District 12 | 191,344 | 69.27% | 84,893 | 30.73% | 0 | 0.00% | 276,237 | 100.00% | Republican hold |
| District 13 | 134,593 | 47.32% | 149,816 | 52.68% | 0 | 0.00% | 284,409 | 100.00% | Democratic hold |
| District 14 | 183,389 | 61.74% | 113,639 | 38.26% | 0 | 0.00% | 297,028 | 100.00% | Republican hold |
| District 15 | 143,112 | 56.96% | 108,139 | 43.04% | 0 | 0.00% | 251,251 | 100.00% | Republican hold |
| Total | 2,318,993 | 56.43% | 1,790,614 | 43.57% | 104 | 0.00% | 4,109,711 | 100.00% | |

== District 1 ==
2022 Ohio's 1st congressional district election
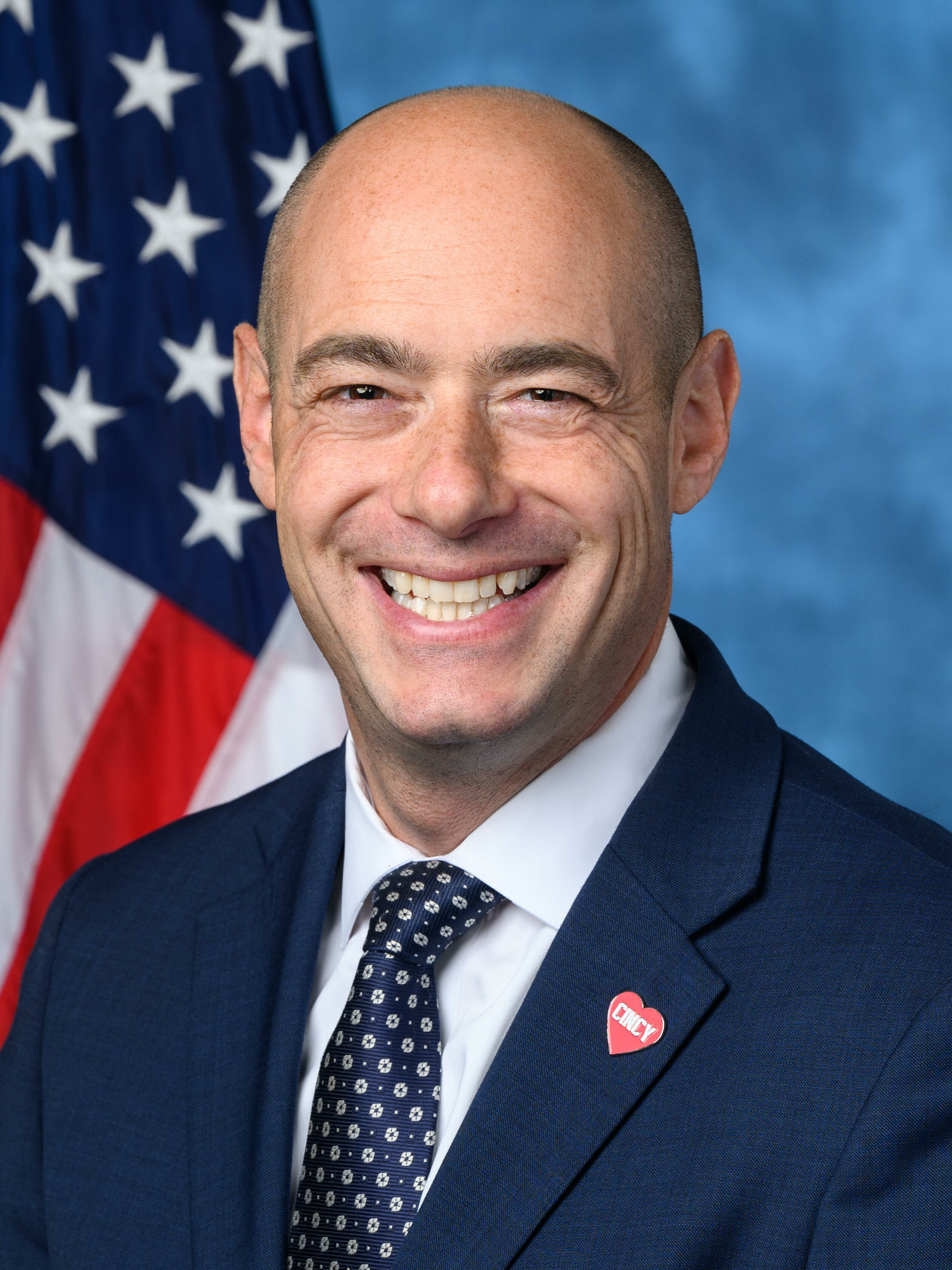

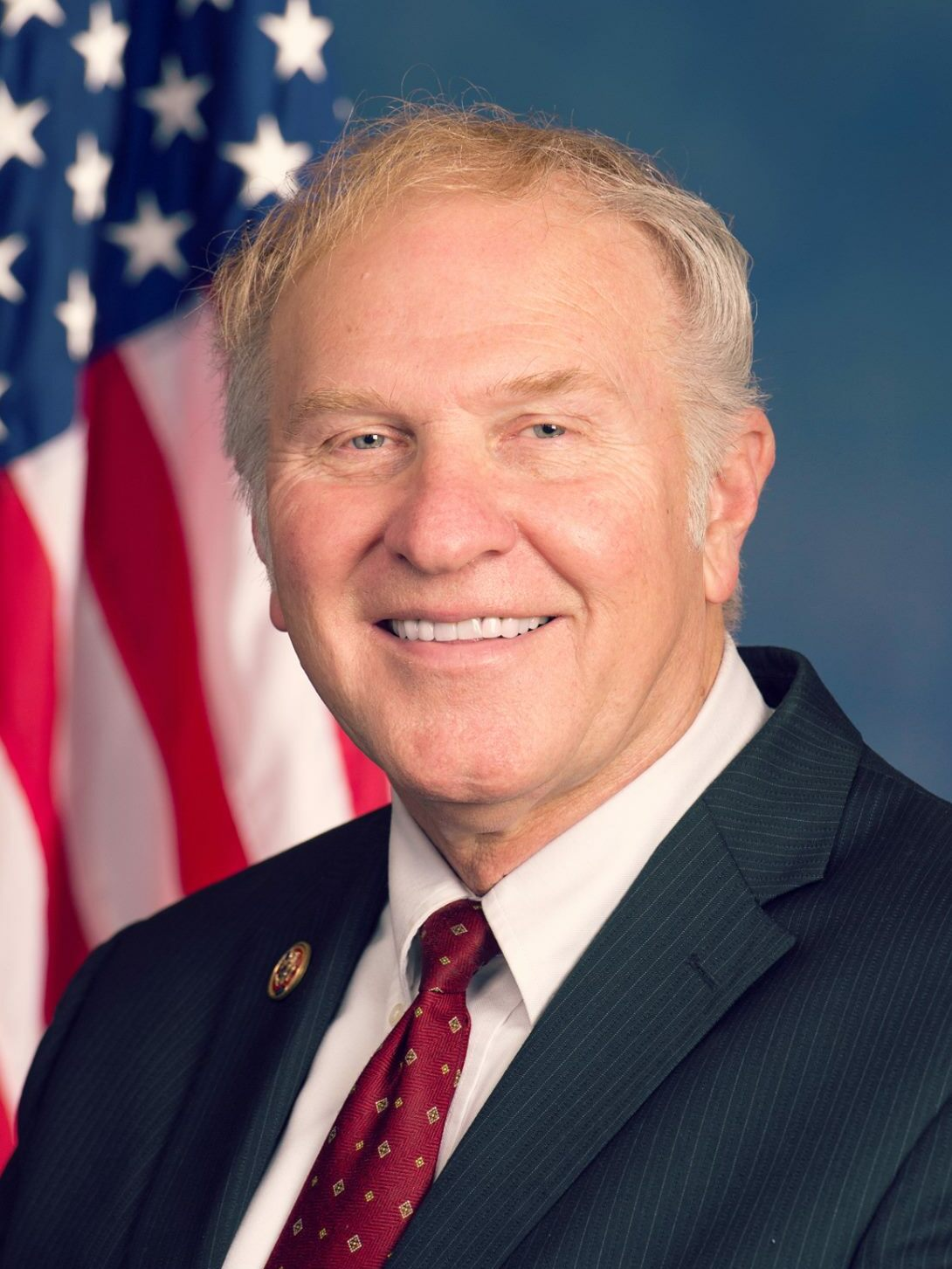
| Nominee | Greg Landsman | Steve Chabot |
| Party | Democratic | Republican |
| Popular vote | 156,416 | 140,058 |
| Percentage | 52.76% | 47.24% |
- Landsman: 50–60% 60–70% 70–80% 80–90% ≥90% Chabot: 50–60% 60–70% 70–80% 80–90%
U.S. Representative before election
Steve Chabot
Republican
Elected U.S. Representative
Greg Landsman
Democratic

The 1st district is based in the city of Cincinnati, stretching northward to Warren County. The incumbent was Republican Steve Chabot, who was re-elected with 51.8% of the vote in 2020.

This district was included on the list of Republican-held seats the Democratic Congressional Campaign Committee targeted in 2022. Democrat Greg Landsman won the election by 14,205 votes.

=== Republican primary ===
==== Candidates ====
===== Nominee =====
- Steve Chabot, incumbent U.S. Representative

===== Withdrawn =====
- Brent Centers, Mayor of Franklin
- Jenn Giroux, Christian activist

==== Endorsements ====
Steve Chabot

Organizations

- International Franchise Association
- National Rifle Association-Political Victory Fund

==== Results ====
Republican primary results
| Party | Candidate | Votes | % |
|---|---|---|---|
| Republican | Steve Chabot (incumbent) | 45,450 | 100.0 |
| Total votes | | 45,450 | 100.0 |

=== Democratic primary ===
==== Candidates ====
===== Nominee =====
- Greg Landsman, Cincinnati city councilor

===== Declined =====
- Gavi Begtrup, small business owner, former policy advisor for U.S. Representative Gabby Giffords, and candidate for Mayor of Cincinnati in 2021 (running for state representative)
- Kate Schroder, health care executive and nominee for this district in 2020

==== Endorsements ====
Greg Landsman

Organizations

- End Citizens United
- Human Rights Campaign PAC
- League of Conservation Voters Action Fund
- Let America Vote
- NARAL Pro-Choice America
- New Democrat Coalition Action Fund
- Planned Parenthood Action Fund
- Sierra Club

==== Results ====
Democratic primary results
| Party | Candidate | Votes | % |
|---|---|---|---|
| Democratic | Greg Landsman | 28,330 | 100.0 |
| Total votes | | 28,330 | 100.0 |

=== General election ===
==== Predictions ====
| Source | Ranking | As of |
|---|---|---|
| The Cook Political Report | Tossup | March 31, 2022 |
| Inside Elections | Tossup | April 22, 2022 |
| Sabato's Crystal Ball | Lean R | November 7, 2022 |
| Politico | Lean D (flip) | November 3, 2022 |
| RCP | Lean R | June 9, 2022 |
| Fox News | Lean R | July 11, 2022 |
| DDHQ | Tossup | October 1, 2022 |
| 538 | Likely R | June 30, 2022 |
| The Economist | Tossup | November 1, 2022 |

==== Polling ====
| Poll source | Date(s) administered | Sample size (Note: Key: A – all adults RV – registered voters LV – likely voters V – unclear) | Margin of error | Steve Chabot (R) | Greg Landsman (D) | Undecided |
|---|---|---|---|---|---|---|
| Impact Research (D) (Note: This poll was sponsored by Landsman's campaign) | October 13–16, 2022 | 504 (LV) | ± 4.4% | 46% | 49% | 5% |
| Impact Research (D) | September 17–21, 2022 | 506 (LV) | ± 4.4% | 46% | 49% | 5% |
| Impact Research (D) | May 9–15, 2022 | 500 (LV) | ± 4.4% | 47% | 47% | 6% |

Hypothetical polling

Generic Republican vs. generic Democrat

| Poll source | Date(s) administered | Sample size | Margin of error | Generic Republican | Generic Democrat | Undecided |
|---|---|---|---|---|---|---|
| Change Research (D) (Note: This poll was sponsored by the House Majority PAC) | October 19, 2022 | – | – | 44% | 49% | 7% |
| Impact Research (D) | May 9–15, 2022 | 500 (LV) | ± 4.4% | 40% | 43% | 17% |

==== Results ====
2022 Ohio's 1st congressional district election
| Party | Candidate | Votes | % |
|---|---|---|---|
| Democratic | Greg Landsman | 156,416 | 52.76 |
| Republican | Steve Chabot (incumbent) | 140,058 | 47.24 |
| Total votes | | 296,474 | 100.0 |
| Democratic gain from Republican | | | |

== District 2 ==
2022 Ohio's 2nd congressional district election
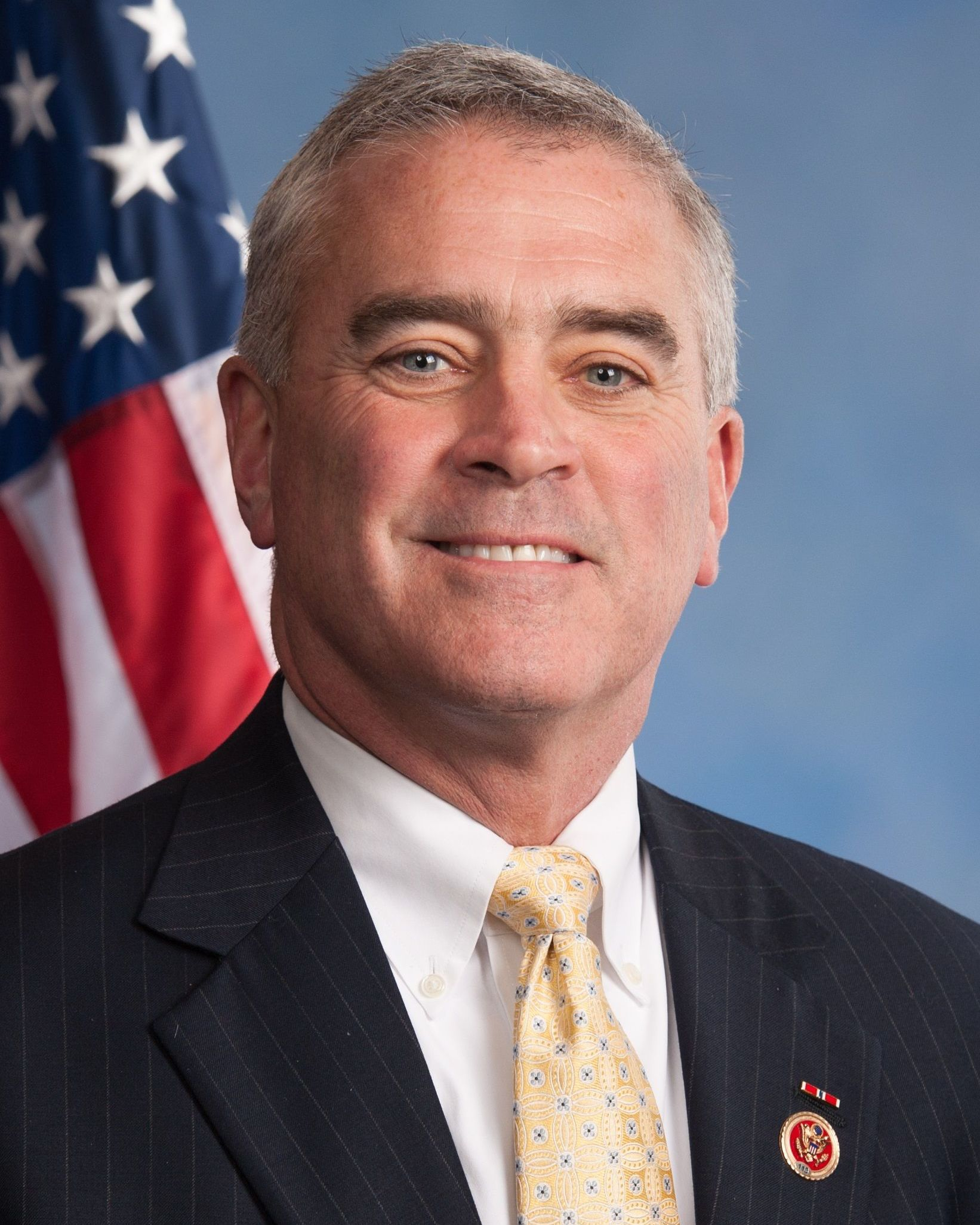

| Nominee | Brad Wenstrup | Samantha Meadows |
| Party | Republican | Democratic |
| Popular vote | 192,117 | 65,745 |
| Percentage | 74.50% | 25.50% |
- Wenstrup: 50–60% 60–70% 70–80% 80–90% ≥90% Meadows: 50–60% 60–70%
U.S. Representative before election
Brad Wenstrup
Republican
Elected U.S. Representative
Brad Wenstrup
Republican

The 2nd district takes in eastern Cincinnati and its suburbs, including Norwood and Loveland, and stretches eastward along the Ohio River. The incumbent was Republican Brad Wenstrup, who was re-elected with 61.1% of the vote in 2020. He was re-elected in 2022.

=== Republican primary ===
==== Candidates ====
===== Nominee =====
- Brad Wenstrup, incumbent U.S. Representative

===== Eliminated in primary =====
- James J. Condit Jr., perennial candidate
- David J. Windisch

==== Endorsements ====
Brad Wenstrup

U.S. Executive Branch officials

- Donald Trump, 45th president of the United States (2017–2021)

Organizations

- National Rifle Association-Political Victory Fund

==== Results ====
Republican primary results
| Party | Candidate | Votes | % |
|---|---|---|---|
| Republican | Brad Wenstrup (incumbent) | 56,805 | 77.4 |
| Republican | James J. Condit, Jr. | 9,250 | 12.6 |
| Republican | David J. Windisch | 7,382 | 10.1 |
| Total votes | | 73,437 | 100.0 |

=== Democratic primary ===
==== Candidates ====
===== Nominee =====
- Samantha Meadows, EMT

===== Eliminated in primary =====
- Alan Darnowsky, former vice president of CitiBank and candidate for state representative in 2020

==== Results ====
Democratic primary results
| Party | Candidate | Votes | % |
|---|---|---|---|
| Democratic | Samantha Meadows | 11,694 | 72.0 |
| Democratic | Alan Darnowsky | 4,541 | 28.0 |
| Total votes | | 16,235 | 100.0 |

=== General election ===
==== Predictions ====
| Source | Ranking | As of |
|---|---|---|
| The Cook Political Report | Solid R | March 31, 2022 |
| Inside Elections | Solid R | April 22, 2022 |
| Sabato's Crystal Ball | Safe R | April 6, 2022 |
| Politico | Solid R | April 5, 2022 |
| RCP | Safe R | June 9, 2022 |
| Fox News | Solid R | July 11, 2022 |
| DDHQ | Solid R | July 20, 2022 |
| 538 | Solid R | June 30, 2022 |
| The Economist | Safe R | September 28, 2022 |

==== Results ====
2022 Ohio's 2nd congressional district election
| Party | Candidate | Votes | % |
|---|---|---|---|
| Republican | Brad Wenstrup (incumbent) | 192,117 | 74.50 |
| Democratic | Samantha Meadows | 65,745 | 25.50 |
| Total votes | | 257,862 | 100.0 |
| Republican hold | | | |

== District 3 ==
2022 Ohio's 3rd congressional district election
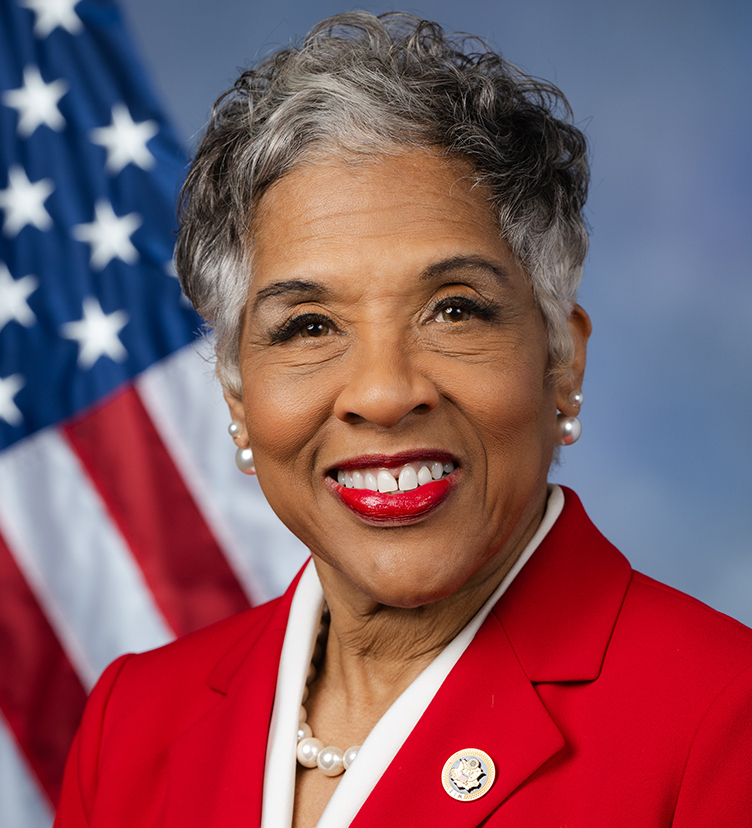

| Nominee | Joyce Beatty | Lee Stahley |
| Party | Democratic | Republican |
| Popular vote | 182,324 | 76,455 |
| Percentage | 70.45% | 29.54% |
- Beatty: 50–60% 60–70% 70–80% 80–90% ≥90% Stahley: 50–60% 60–70% Tie: 40–50%
U.S. Representative before election
Joyce Beatty
Democratic
Elected U.S. Representative
Joyce Beatty
Democratic

The 3rd district, located entirely within the borders of Franklin County, taking in inner Columbus, Bexley, Whitehall, as well as Franklin County's share of Reynoldsburg. The incumbent was Democrat Joyce Beatty, who was re-elected with 70.8% of the vote in 2020. She was re-elected in 2022.

=== Democratic primary ===
==== Candidates ====
===== Nominee =====
- Joyce Beatty, incumbent U.S. Representative

===== Withdrawn =====
- Matthew Meade

===== Endorsements =====
Joyce Beatty

Organizations

- Feminist Majority PAC
- League of Conservation Voters Action Fund
- Pro-Israel America
- Sierra Club

==== Results ====
Democratic primary results
| Party | Candidate | Votes | % |
|---|---|---|---|
| Democratic | Joyce Beatty (incumbent) | 48,241 | 100.0 |
| Total votes | | 48,241 | 100.0 |

=== Republican primary ===
==== Candidates ====
===== Nominee =====
- Lee Stahley, professor and Whitehall city councilor

==== Results ====
Republican primary results
| Party | Candidate | Votes | % |
|---|---|---|---|
| Republican | Lee Stahley | 30,250 | 100.0 |
| Total votes | | 30,250 | 100.0 |

=== General election ===
==== Predictions ====
| Source | Ranking | As of |
|---|---|---|
| The Cook Political Report | Solid D | March 31, 2022 |
| Inside Elections | Solid D | April 22, 2022 |
| Sabato's Crystal Ball | Safe D | April 6, 2022 |
| Politico | Solid D | April 5, 2022 |
| RCP | Safe D | June 9, 2022 |
| Fox News | Solid D | July 11, 2022 |
| DDHQ | Solid D | July 20, 2022 |
| 538 | Solid D | June 30, 2022 |
| The Economist | Safe D | September 28, 2022 |

==== Results ====
2022 Ohio's 3rd congressional district election
| Party | Candidate | Votes | % |
|---|---|---|---|
| Democratic | Joyce Beatty (incumbent) | 182,324 | 70.45 |
| Republican | Lee Stahley | 76,455 | 29.54 |
| Write-in | | 18 | 0.01 |
| Total votes | | 258,797 | 100.0 |
| Democratic hold | | | |

== District 4 ==
2022 Ohio's 4th congressional district election
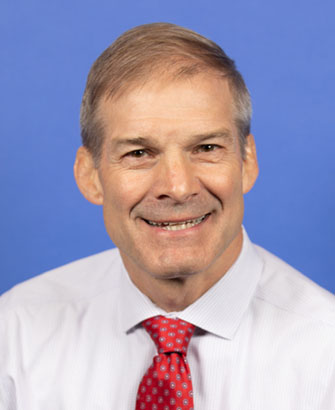

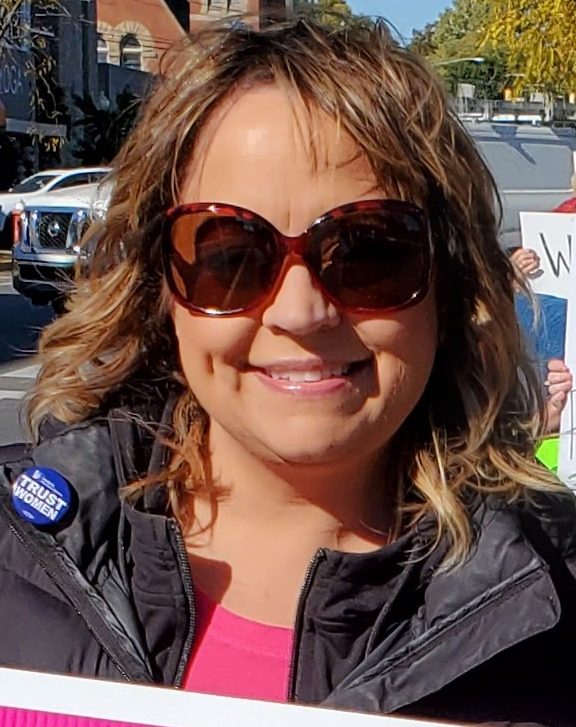
| Nominee | Jim Jordan | Tamie Wilson |
| Party | Republican | Democratic |
| Popular vote | 200,773 | 89,383 |
| Percentage | 69.19% | 30.81% |
- Jordan: 50–60% 60–70% 70–80% 80–90% ≥90% Wilson: 50–60% 60–70% 70–80% 80–90%
U.S. Representative before election
Jim Jordan
Republican
Elected U.S. Representative
Jim Jordan
Republican

The 4th district, sprawls from the Columbus exurbs, including Marion and Lima into north-central Ohio, taking in Mansfield. The incumbent was Republican Jim Jordan, who was re-elected with 67.9% of the vote in 2020. He was re-elected in 2022.

=== Republican primary ===
==== Candidates ====
===== Nominee =====
- Jim Jordan, incumbent U.S. Representative

==== Endorsements ====
Jim Jordan

U.S. Executive Branch officials

- Donald Trump, 45th president of the United States (2017–2021)

Organizations

- American Conservative Union

==== Results ====
Republican primary results
| Party | Candidate | Votes | % |
|---|---|---|---|
| Republican | Jim Jordan (incumbent) | 86,576 | 100.0 |
| Total votes | | 86,576 | 100.0 |

=== Democratic primary ===
==== Candidates ====
===== Nominee =====
- Tamie Wilson, entrepreneur

===== Eliminated in primary =====
- Jeffrey Sites, U.S. Army veteran and candidate in 2020

==== Endorsements ====
Jeffrey Sites

Organizations

- VoteVets.org

==== Results ====
Democratic primary results
| Party | Candidate | Votes | % |
|---|---|---|---|
| Democratic | Tamie Wilson | 10,804 | 51.5 |
| Democratic | Jeffrey Sites | 10,160 | 48.5 |
| Total votes | | 20,964 | 100.0 |

=== General election ===
==== Predictions ====
| Source | Ranking | As of |
|---|---|---|
| The Cook Political Report | Solid R | March 31, 2022 |
| Inside Elections | Solid R | April 22, 2022 |
| Sabato's Crystal Ball | Safe R | April 6, 2022 |
| Politico | Solid R | April 5, 2022 |
| RCP | Safe R | June 9, 2022 |
| Fox News | Solid R | July 11, 2022 |
| DDHQ | Solid R | July 20, 2022 |
| 538 | Solid R | June 30, 2022 |
| The Economist | Safe R | September 28, 2022 |

==== Results ====
2022 Ohio's 4th congressional district election
| Party | Candidate | Votes | % |
|---|---|---|---|
| Republican | Jim Jordan (incumbent) | 200,773 | 69.19 |
| Democratic | Tamie Wilson | 89,383 | 30.81 |
| Total votes | | 290,156 | 100.0 |
| Republican hold | | | |

== District 5 ==
2022 Ohio's 5th congressional district election
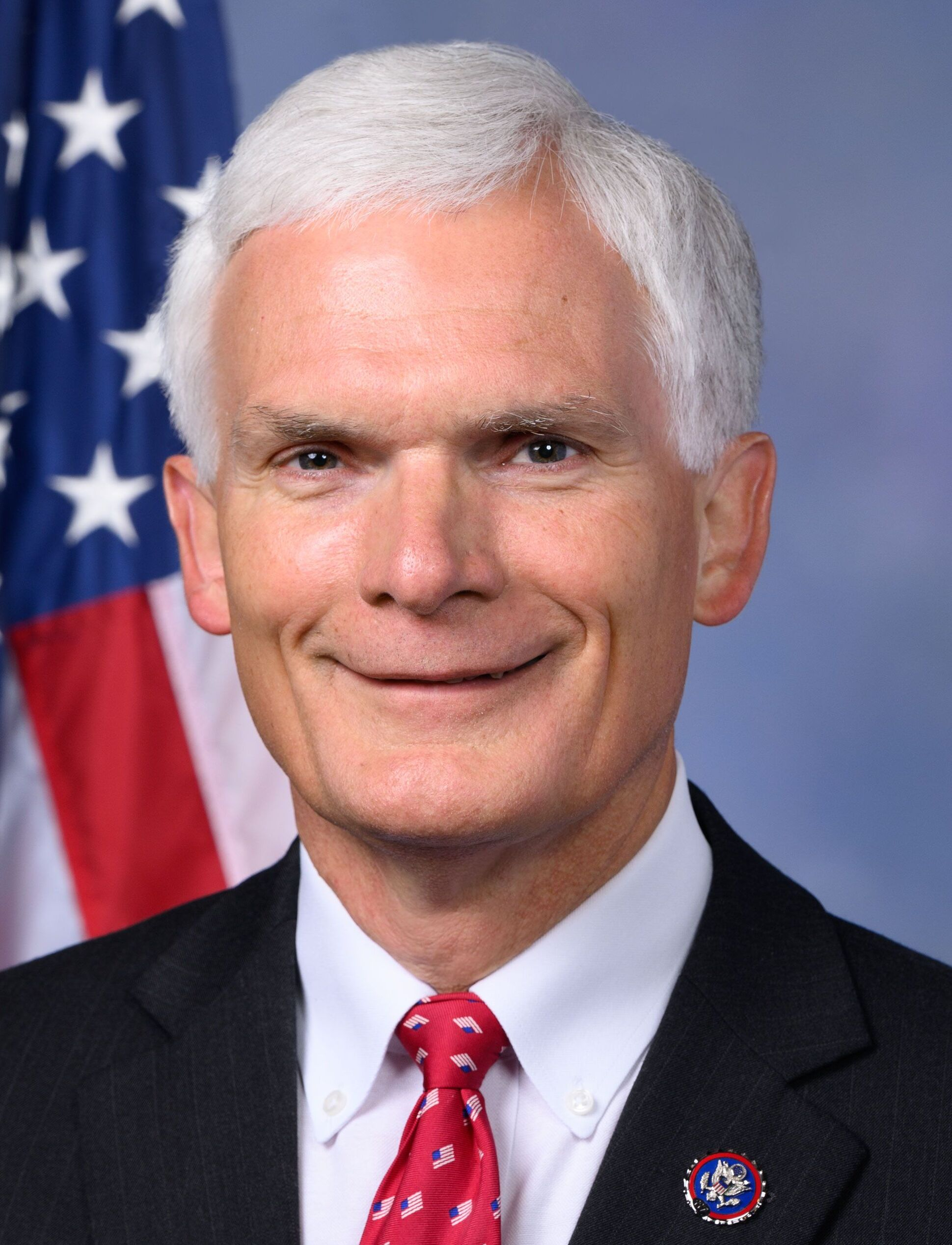

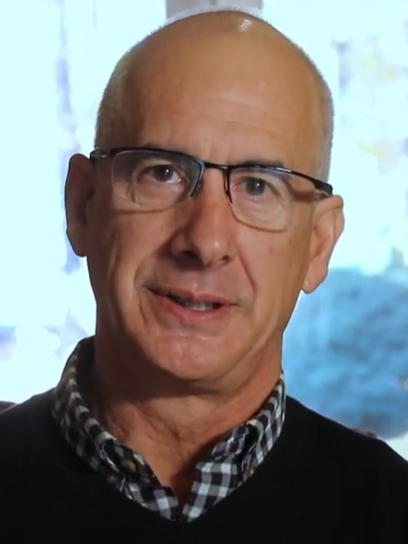
| Nominee | Bob Latta | Craig Swartz |
| Party | Republican | Democratic |
| Popular vote | 187,303 | 92,634 |
| Percentage | 66.91% | 33.09% |
- Latta: 50–60% 60–70% 70–80% 80–90% ≥90% Swartz: 50–60% 60–70% 70–80% 80–90% ≥90%
U.S. Representative before election
Bob Latta
Republican
Elected U.S. Representative
Bob Latta
Republican

The 5th district encompasses the lower portion of Northwestern Ohio and the middle shore of Lake Erie, taking in Findlay, Lorain, Oberlin, and Bowling Green. The incumbent was Republican Bob Latta, who was re-elected with 68.0% of the vote in 2020. He was re-elected in 2022.

=== Republican primary ===
==== Candidates ====
===== Nominee =====
- Bob Latta, incumbent U.S. Representative

==== Endorsements ====
Bob Latta

U.S. Executive Branch officials

- Donald Trump, 45th president of the United States (2017–2021)

==== Results ====
Republican primary results
| Party | Candidate | Votes | % |
|---|---|---|---|
| Republican | Bob Latta (incumbent) | 69,981 | 100.0 |
| Total votes | | 69,981 | 100.0 |

=== Democratic primary ===
==== Candidates ====
===== Nominee =====
- Craig Swartz, chair of the Wyandot County Democratic Party

===== Eliminated in primary =====
- Martin Heberling, Amherst city councilor

==== Results ====
Democratic primary results
| Party | Candidate | Votes | % |
|---|---|---|---|
| Democratic | Craig Swartz | 14,590 | 55.3 |
| Democratic | Martin Heberling | 11,812 | 44.7 |
| Total votes | | 26,402 | 100.0 |

=== General election ===
==== Predictions ====
| Source | Ranking | As of |
|---|---|---|
| The Cook Political Report | Solid R | March 31, 2022 |
| Inside Elections | Solid R | April 22, 2022 |
| Sabato's Crystal Ball | Safe R | April 6, 2022 |
| Politico | Solid R | April 5, 2022 |
| RCP | Safe R | June 9, 2022 |
| Fox News | Solid R | July 11, 2022 |
| DDHQ | Solid R | July 20, 2022 |
| 538 | Solid R | June 30, 2022 |
| The Economist | Safe R | September 28, 2022 |

==== Results ====
2022 Ohio's 5th congressional district election
| Party | Candidate | Votes | % |
|---|---|---|---|
| Republican | Bob Latta (incumbent) | 187,303 | 66.91 |
| Democratic | Craig Swartz | 92,634 | 33.09 |
| Total votes | | 279,937 | 100.0 |
| Republican hold | | | |

== District 6 ==
2022 Ohio's 6th congressional district election
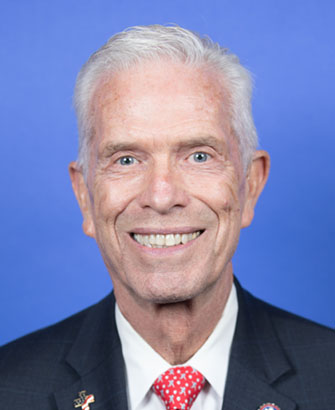

| Nominee | Bill Johnson | Louis Lyras |
| Party | Republican | Democratic |
| Popular vote | 189,883 | 90,500 |
| Percentage | 67.72% | 32.28% |
- Johnson: 50–60% 60–70% 70–80% 80–90% ≥90% Lyras: 50–60% 60–70% 70–80% 80–90% ≥90%
U.S. Representative before election
Bill Johnson
Republican
Elected U.S. Representative
Bill Johnson
Republican

The 6th district encompasses Appalachian Ohio and the Mahoning Valley, including Youngstown, Steubenville, and Marietta. The incumbent was Republican Bill Johnson, who was re-elected with 74.4% in 2020. Some parts of the 6th district, including Youngstown, were formerly in the 13th district before redistricting. He was re-elected in 2022.

=== Republican primary ===
==== Candidates ====
===== Nominee =====
- Bill Johnson, incumbent U.S. Representative

===== Eliminated in primary =====
- John Anderson
- Michael Morgenstern, U.S. Marine Corps Veteran
- Gregory Zelenitz

==== Endorsements ====
Bill Johnson

U.S. Executive Branch officials

- Donald Trump, 45th president of the United States (2017–2021)

Organizations

- National Rifle Association-Political Victory Fund

==== Results ====
Republican primary results
| Party | Candidate | Votes | % |
|---|---|---|---|
| Republican | Bill Johnson (incumbent) | 57,189 | 77.32 |
| Republican | John Anderson | 9,212 | 12.49 |
| Republican | Michael Morgenstern | 4,926 | 6.66 |
| Republican | Gregory Zelenitz | 2,632 | 3.56 |
| Total votes | | 73,959 | 100.0 |

=== Democratic primary ===
==== Candidates ====
===== Nominee =====
- Louis Lyras, businessman

===== Eliminated in primary =====
- Martin Alexander
- Eric Scott Jones, data scientist
- Shawna Roberts

===== Declined =====
- John Boccieri, former U.S. Representative for the 16th district
- Capri Cafaro, former Minority Leader of the Ohio Senate
- Lou Gentile, former state senator
- Sean O'Brien, former state senator (ran for Trumbull County Court of Pleas)
- Tim Ryan, incumbent U.S. Representative (ran for U.S. Senate)
- Anthony Traficanti, Mahoning County commissioner

==== Results ====
Democratic primary results
| Party | Candidate | Votes | % |
|---|---|---|---|
| Democratic | Louis Lyras | 8,607 | 37.64 |
| Democratic | Eric Scott Jones | 6,972 | 30.49 |
| Democratic | Martin Alexander | 5,062 | 22.14 |
| Democratic | Shawna Roberts | 2,226 | 9.73 |
| Total votes | | 22,867 | 100.0 |

=== General election ===
==== Predictions ====
| Source | Ranking | As of |
|---|---|---|
| The Cook Political Report | Solid R | March 31, 2022 |
| Inside Elections | Solid R | April 22, 2022 |
| Sabato's Crystal Ball | Safe R | April 6, 2022 |
| Politico | Solid R | April 5, 2022 |
| RCP | Safe R | June 9, 2022 |
| Fox News | Solid R | July 11, 2022 |
| DDHQ | Solid R | July 20, 2022 |
| 538 | Solid R | June 30, 2022 |
| The Economist | Safe R | September 28, 2022 |

==== Results ====
2022 Ohio's 6th congressional district election
| Party | Candidate | Votes | % |
|---|---|---|---|
| Republican | Bill Johnson (incumbent) | 189,883 | 67.72 |
| Democratic | Louis Lyras | 90,500 | 32.28 |
| Total votes | | 280,383 | 100.0 |
| Republican hold | | | |

== District 7 ==
2022 Ohio's 7th congressional district election
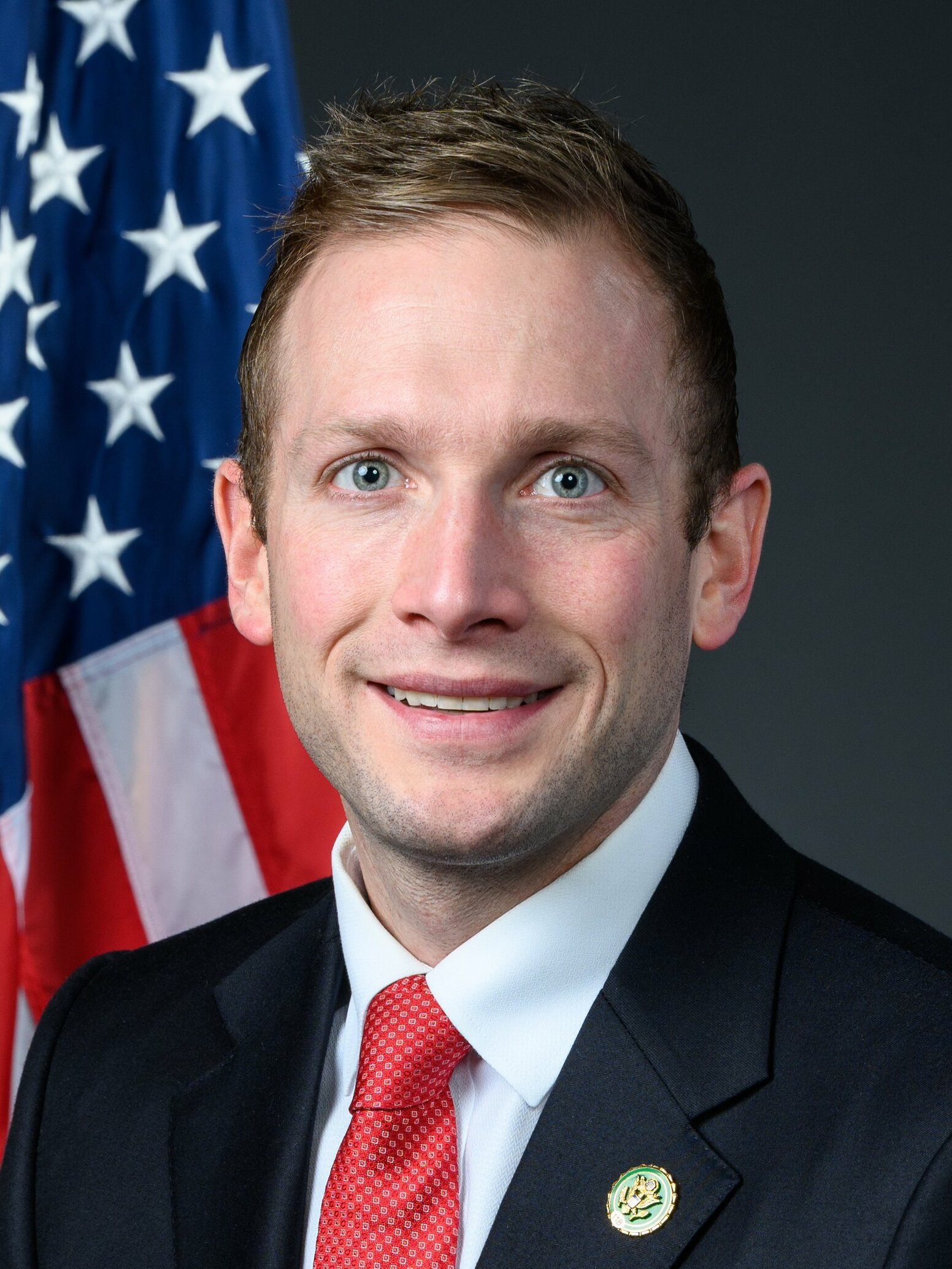

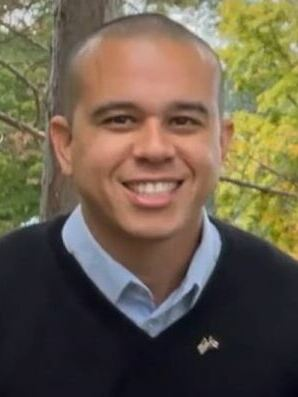
| Nominee | Max Miller | Matthew Diemer |
| Party | Republican | Democratic |
| Popular vote | 168,002 | 135,485 |
| Percentage | 55.34% | 44.63% |
- Miller: 50–60% 60–70% 70–80% 80–90% ≥90% Diemer: 50–60% 60–70% 70–80% 80–90% ≥90%
U.S. Representatives before election
Bob Gibbs (Republican)
Anthony Gonzalez (Republican)
Elected U.S. Representatives
Max Miller
Republican

The 7th district stretches from exurban Cleveland to rural areas in north central Ohio, including Medina and Wooster. The incumbents were Republicans Bob Gibbs and Anthony Gonzalez, both of whom retired. Max Miller won the election.

=== Republican primary ===
==== Candidates ====
===== Nominee =====
- Max Miller, former White House aide

===== Eliminated in primary =====
- Anthony Leon Alexander, podcaster
- Charlie Gaddis, business owner
- Jonah Schulz, non-profit founder

===== Withdrawn =====
- Bob Gibbs, incumbent U.S. Representative
- Matt Shoemaker, former Intelligence Officer

===== Declined =====
- Anthony Gonzalez, incumbent U.S. Representative

==== Endorsements ====
Max Miller

U.S. Executive Branch officials

- Donald Trump, 45th president of the United States (2017–2021)

Organizations

- American Conservative Union
- Club for Growth
- Turning Point Action

==== Polling ====
Hypothetical polling

| Poll source | Date(s) administered | Sample size | Margin of error | Anthony Gonzalez | Max Miller | Undecided |
|---|---|---|---|---|---|---|
| WPA Intelligence (R) (Note: This poll was sponsored by Club for Growth Action) | March 17–18, 2021 | 411 (LV) | ± 4.9% | 30% | 39% | 31% |

==== Results ====
Republican primary results
| Party | Candidate | Votes | % |
|---|---|---|---|
| Republican | Max Miller | 43,158 | 71.8 |
| Republican | Jonah Schulz | 8,325 | 13.9 |
| Republican | Charlie Gaddis | 5,581 | 9.3 |
| Republican | Anthony Leon Alexander | 3,033 | 5.0 |
| Total votes | | 60,097 | 100.0 |

=== Democratic primary ===
==== Candidates ====
===== Nominee =====
- Matthew Diemer, podcast producer

===== Eliminated in primary =====
- Tristan Rader, Lakewood city councilor

===== Withdrawn =====
- Patrick A. Malley

==== Endorsements ====
Mathew Diemer

Organizations

- Forward Party

Newspapers

- The Plain Dealer (in primary and in general)

==== Results ====
Democratic primary results
| Party | Candidate | Votes | % |
|---|---|---|---|
| Democratic | Matthew Diemer | 12,636 | 62.8 |
| Democratic | Tristan Rader | 7,500 | 37.2 |
| Total votes | | 20,136 | 100.0 |

=== Independents ===
- Brian Kenderes (write-in)
- Vince Licursi (write-in)

==== Filed paperwork ====
- Lynn Carol Gorman, minister

=== General election ===
==== Predictions ====
| Source | Ranking | As of |
|---|---|---|
| The Cook Political Report | Solid R | March 31, 2022 |
| Inside Elections | Solid R | April 22, 2022 |
| Sabato's Crystal Ball | Safe R | April 6, 2022 |
| Politico | Likely R | April 5, 2022 |
| RCP | Safe R | June 9, 2022 |
| Fox News | Solid R | July 11, 2022 |
| DDHQ | Solid R | July 20, 2022 |
| 538 | Solid R | June 30, 2022 |
| The Economist | Safe R | September 28, 2022 |

==== Results ====
2022 Ohio's 7th congressional district election
| Party | Candidate | Votes | % |
|---|---|---|---|
| Republican | Max Miller | 168,002 | 55.34 |
| Democratic | Matthew Diemer | 135,485 | 44.63 |
| Write-in | | 86 | 0.03 |
| Total votes | | 303,573 | 100.0 |
| Republican hold | | | |

== District 8 ==
2022 Ohio's 8th congressional district election
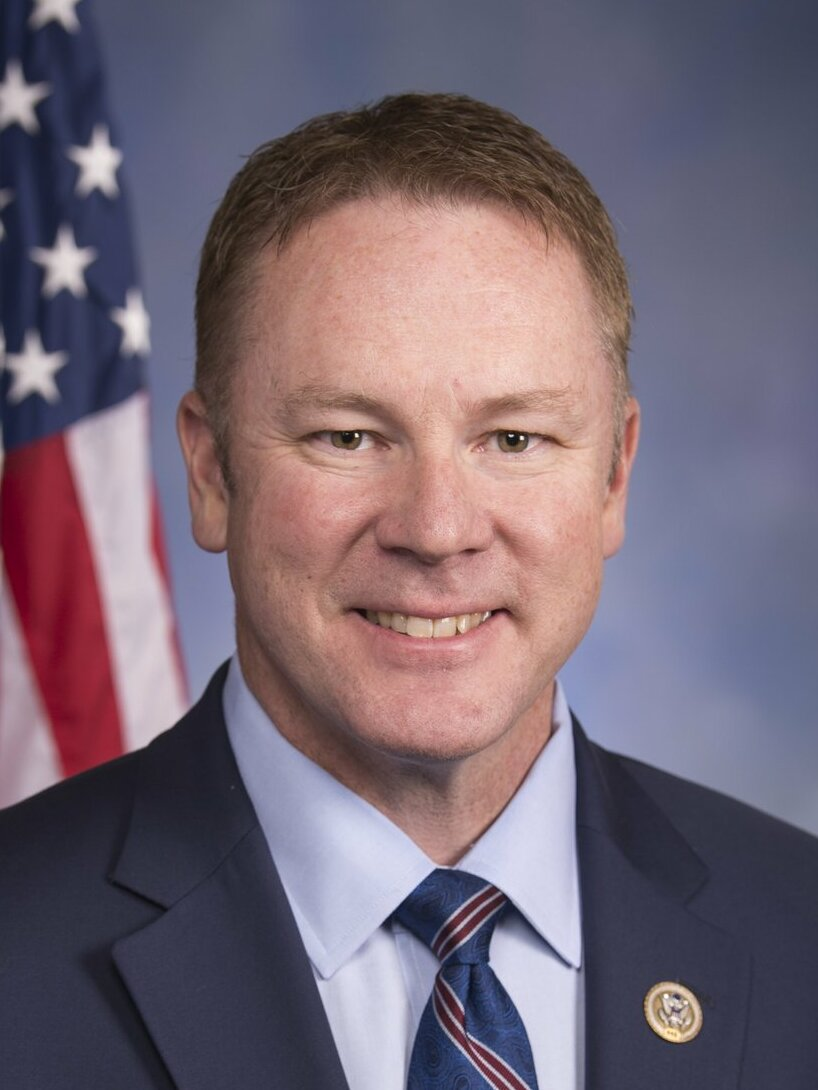

| Nominee | Warren Davidson | Vanessa Enoch |
| Party | Republican | Democratic |
| Popular vote | 180,287 | 98,629 |
| Percentage | 64.64% | 35.36% |
- Davidson: 50–60% 60–70% 70–80% 80–90% ≥90% Enoch: 50–60% 60–70% 70–80% 80–90% ≥90%
U.S. Representative before election
Warren Davidson
Republican
Elected U.S. Representative
Warren Davidson
Republican

The 8th district takes in the northern and western suburbs of Cincinnati, including Butler County. The incumbent was Republican Warren Davidson, who was re-elected with 69.0% of the vote in 2020. He was re-elected in 2022.

=== Republican primary ===
==== Candidates ====
===== Nominee =====
- Warren Davidson, incumbent U.S. Representative

===== Eliminated in primary =====
- Phil Heimlich, former Cincinnati city councilman

==== Results ====
Republican primary results
| Party | Candidate | Votes | % |
|---|---|---|---|
| Republican | Warren Davidson (incumbent) | 50,372 | 72.4 |
| Republican | Phil Heimlich | 19,230 | 27.6 |
| Total votes | | 69,602 | 100.0 |

=== Democratic primary ===
==== Candidates ====
===== Nominee =====
- Vanessa Enoch, former journalist and nominee in 2018 and 2020

==== Results ====
Democratic primary results
| Party | Candidate | Votes | % |
|---|---|---|---|
| Democratic | Vanessa Enoch | 18,290 | 100.0 |
| Total votes | | 18,290 | 100.0 |

=== General election ===
==== Predictions ====
| Source | Ranking | As of |
|---|---|---|
| The Cook Political Report | Solid R | March 31, 2022 |
| Inside Elections | Solid R | April 22, 2022 |
| Sabato's Crystal Ball | Safe R | April 6, 2022 |
| Politico | Solid R | April 5, 2022 |
| RCP | Safe R | June 9, 2022 |
| Fox News | Solid R | July 11, 2022 |
| DDHQ | Solid R | July 20, 2022 |
| 538 | Solid R | June 30, 2022 |
| The Economist | Safe R | September 28, 2022 |

==== Results ====
2022 Ohio's 8th congressional district election
| Party | Candidate | Votes | % |
|---|---|---|---|
| Republican | Warren Davidson (incumbent) | 180,287 | 64.64 |
| Democratic | Vanessa Enoch | 98,629 | 35.36 |
| Total votes | | 278,916 | 100.0 |
| Republican hold | | | |

==== By county ====
| County | Warren Davidson Republican | | Vanessa Enoch Democratic | | Other votes | | Total votes |
| County | % | # | % | # | % | # | Total votes |
|---|---|---|---|---|---|---|---|
| Butler | 65.33% | 83,837 | 34.67% | 44,497 | | | |
| Darke | 84.43% | 16,770 | 15.57% | 3,092 | | | |
| Hamilton | 56.64% | 60,703 | 43.36% | 46,476 | | | |
| Miami | 79.69% | 6,183 | 20.31% | 1,576 | | | |
| Preble | 81.07% | 12,794 | 18.93% | 2,988 | | | |

== District 9 ==
2022 Ohio's 9th congressional district election
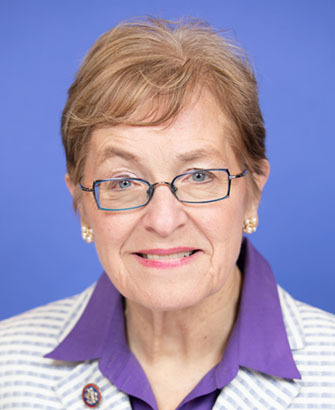

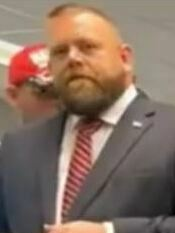
| Nominee | Marcy Kaptur | J.R. Majewski |
| Party | Democratic | Republican |
| Popular vote | 150,655 | 115,362 |
| Percentage | 56.63% | 43.37% |
- Kaptur: 50–60% 60–70% 70–80% 80–90% ≥90% Majewski: 50–60% 60–70% 70–80%
U.S. Representative before election
Marcy Kaptur
Democratic
Elected U.S. Representative
Marcy Kaptur
Democratic

The 9th district is based in Northwest Ohio, including Toledo and the western Lake Erie coast. The incumbent was Democrat Marcy Kaptur, who was re-elected with 63.1% of the vote in 2020. She was running for re-election.

This district was included on the list of Democratic-held seats the National Republican Congressional Committee targeted in 2022. The seat was significantly changed due to redistricting, losing all of its territory in Lorain and Cuyahoga counties while picking up more territory in northwest Ohio. This turned the district from a safely Democratic seat to a competitive one.

During the campaign, the Associated Press reported that Majewski may have falsified his service record and lied about serving in Afghanistan.

Kaptur was re-elected in 2022; her win was the second largest overperformance by a Democratic candidate of their district's baseline partisanship in the 2022 election, in part due to accusations that Majewski stole valor.

=== Democratic primary ===
==== Candidates ====
===== Nominee =====
- Marcy Kaptur, incumbent U.S. Representative

==== Endorsements ====
Marcy Kaptur

Organizations

- Feminist Majority PAC
- Natural Resources Defense Council

==== Results ====
Democratic primary results
| Party | Candidate | Votes | % |
|---|---|---|---|
| Democratic | Marcy Kaptur (incumbent) | 32,968 | 100.0 |
| Total votes | | 32,968 | 100.0 |

=== Republican primary ===
Results by county: Majewski: 30–40% Riedel: 30–40% 50–60% Gavarone: 30–40% 40–50%

==== Candidates ====
===== Nominee =====
- J.R. Majewski, U.S. Air Force veteran and rapper

===== Eliminated in primary =====
- Beth Deck
- Theresa Gavarone, state senator from the 2nd district and former state representative from the 3rd district
- Craig Riedel, state representative from the 82nd district

===== Withdrawn =====
- Madison Gesiotto, 2014 Miss Ohio USA, political commentator, and lawyer (running in the 13th district)

==== Endorsements ====
Theresa Gavarone

U.S. Representatives

- Bob Latta, U.S. Representative for Ohio's 5th congressional district (2007–present)

State senators

- Nathan Manning, state senator from the 13th district (2019–present)

State representatives

- Rex Damschroder, former state representative from the 88th district (1995–2002; 2011–2014)

Newspapers and other media

- The Chronicle-Telegram (Republican primary only)

Organizations

- U.S. Chamber of Commerce
J.R. Majewski

Federal officials

- Donald Trump, former president of the United States
Craig Riedel

U.S. representatives

- Jim Jordan, U.S. Representative for Ohio's 4th congressional district (2007–present)

State representatives

- Cindy Abrams, state representative from the 29th district (2019–present)
- Adam Bird, state representative from the 66th district (2021–present)
- Tom Brinkman, state representative from the 27th district (2001–2008; 2015–present)
- Gary Click, state representative from the 88th district (2021–present)
- Rodney Creech, state representative from the 43rd district (2021–present)
- Jon Cross, state representative from the 83rd district (2019–present)
- Bill Dean, state representative from the 74th district (2016–present)
- Ron Ferguson, state representative from the 96th district (2021–present)
- Mark Fraizer, state representative from the 71st district (2019–present)
- Diane Grendell, state representative from the 76th district (1992–2000; 2019–present)
- Thomas Hall, state representative from the 53rd district (2021–present)
- Adam Holmes, state representative from the 97th district (2019–present)
- Marilyn John, state representative from the 2nd district (2021–present)
- Kris Jordan, state representative from the 67th district (2009–2010; 2019–present) and former state senator from the 19th district (2011–2018)
- Darrell Kick, state representative from the 70th district (2017–present)
- Kyle Koehler, state representative from the 79th district (2015–present)
- Brian Lampton, state representative from the 73rd district (2021–present)
- Laura Lanese, state representative from the 23rd district (2017–present)
- Mike Loychik, state representative from the 63rd district (2021–present)
- Riordan McClain, state representative from the 87th district (2018–present)
- Derek Merrin, state representative from the 47th district (2016–present)
- Kevin D. Miller, state representative from the 72nd district (2021–present)
- Scott Oelslager, state representative from the 48th district (2003–2010; 2019–present) and former state senator from the 29th district (1985–2002; 2011–2018)
- Phil Plummer, state representative from the 40th district (2019–present)
- Jean Schmidt, state representative from the 65th district (2021–present) and the 66th district (2001–2004), former U.S. Representative for OH-02 (2005–2013)
- Bill Seitz, Majority Leader of the Ohio House of Representatives (2017–present), state representative from the 30th district (2001–2007; 2017–present) and former state senator from the 8th district (2007–2016)
- Dick Stein, state representative from the 57th district (2017–present)
- Reggie Stoltzfus, state representative from the 50th district (2019–present)
- Andrea White, state representative from the 41st district (2021–present)
- Scott Wiggam, state representative from the 1st district (2017–present)
- Bob Young, state representative from the 36th district (2021–present)
- Tom Young, state representative from the 42nd district (2021–present)

==== Results ====
Republican primary results
| Party | Candidate | Votes | % |
|---|---|---|---|
| Republican | J.R. Majewski | 21,850 | 35.8 |
| Republican | Craig Riedel | 18,757 | 30.7 |
| Republican | Theresa Gavarone | 17,542 | 28.7 |
| Republican | Beth Deck | 2,931 | 4.8 |
| Total votes | | 61,080 | 100.0 |

=== Independents ===
==== Filed paperwork ====
- Youseff Baddar, teacher and activist

=== General election ===
J.R. Majewski ran on his military experience, claiming to have been a combat veteran deployed to Afghanistan. A public records request by the Associated Press showed that Majewski worked for six months loading planes in Qatar but did not receive any medals given to those who served in Afghanistan, and the campaign did not confirm if he was ever there.

However, in August 2023, the United States Air Force added the Global War on Terrorism Expeditionary Medal to Majewski's record and issued a corrected discharge form. Majewski said that the correction had "vindicated" him, after questions about his military service arose in the media during the 2022 general election. According to The Toledo Blade, Majewski said he did in fact deliver cargo to Afghanistan, among other locations, and that the military still referred to him as a combat veteran even though "not all of us were kicking in doors and shooting people".

Although the district would have gone for Donald Trump by 2.9 points, Kaptur easily won re-election. Kaptur won Erie County, which Trump won by over 10 points, and was the only Democrat to win this county in this election cycle. Her performance was the largest overperformance of the partisan baseline by a Democratic candidate during the 2022 midterms.

==== Endorsements ====
Marcy Kaptur (D)

Organizations

- Humane Society of the United States Legislative Fund
- League of Conservation Voters
- Sierra Club

==== Predictions ====
| Source | Ranking | As of |
|---|---|---|
| The Cook Political Report | Lean D | September 30, 2022 |
| Inside Elections | Lean D | October 7, 2022 |
| Sabato's Crystal Ball | Lean D | September 29, 2022 |
| Politico | Lean D | October 3, 2022 |
| RCP | Tossup | October 15, 2022 |
| Fox News | Lean D | October 11, 2022 |
| DDHQ | Lean R (flip) | October 17, 2022 |
| 538 | Likely D | October 25, 2022 |
| The Economist | Tossup | September 28, 2022 |

==== Polling ====
| Poll source | Date(s) administered | Sample size | Margin of error | Marcy Kaptur (D) | J. R. Majewski (R) | Undecided |
|---|---|---|---|---|---|---|
| Info Strategy Northeast (R) | June 28–29, 2022 | 1,254 (LV) | ± 2.0% | 47% | 42% | 11% |

==== Results ====
2022 Ohio's 9th congressional district election
| Party | Candidate | Votes | % |
|---|---|---|---|
| Democratic | Marcy Kaptur (incumbent) | 150,655 | 56.63 |
| Republican | J.R. Majewski | 115,362 | 43.37 |
| Total votes | | 266,017 | 100.0 |
| Democratic hold | | | |

== District 10 ==
2022 Ohio's 10th congressional district election
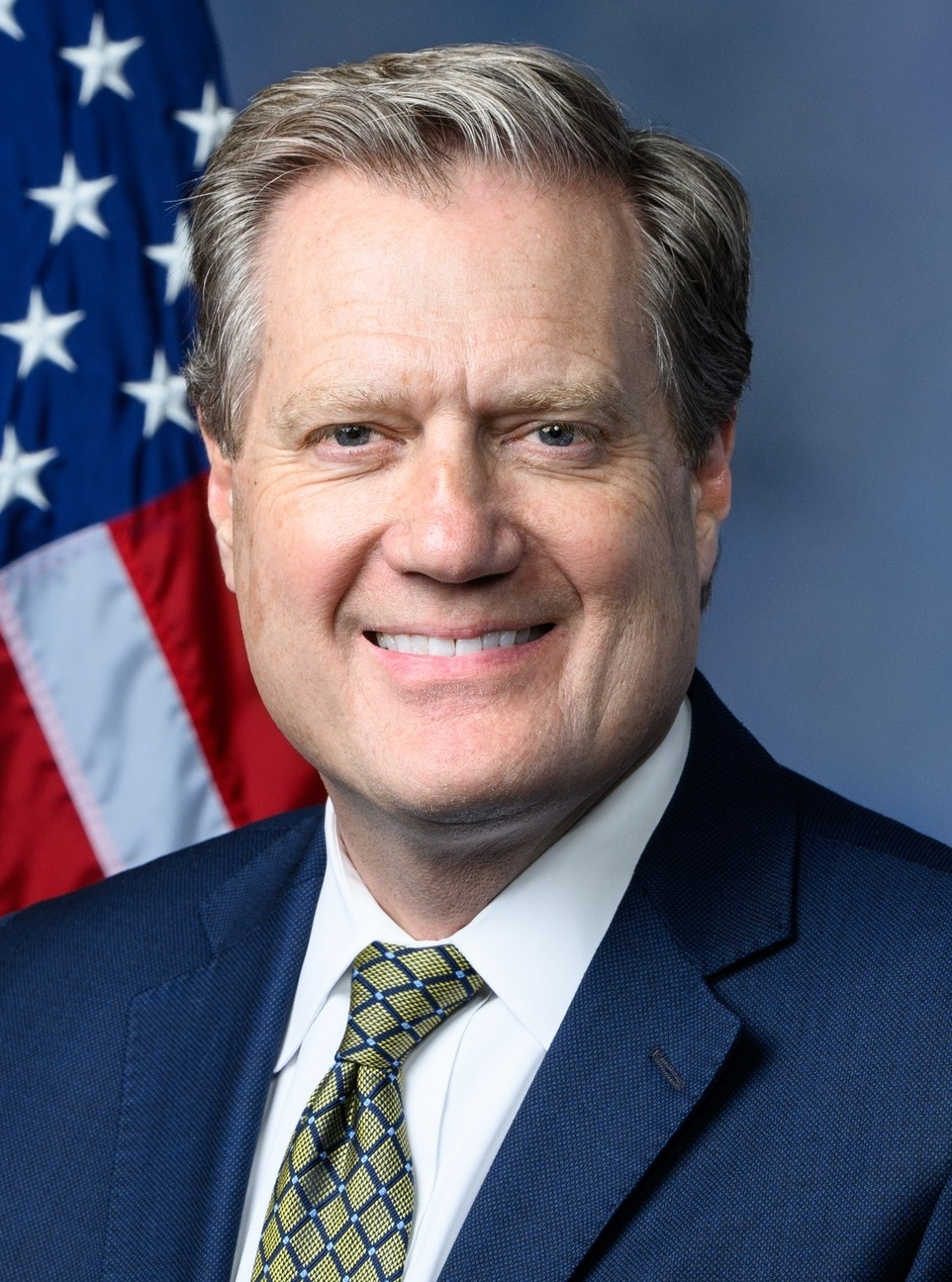

| Nominee | Mike Turner | David Esrati |
| Party | Republican | Democratic |
| Popular vote | 168,327 | 104,634 |
| Percentage | 61.67% | 38.33% |
- Turner: 50–60% 60–70% 70–80% 80–90% ≥90% Esrati: 50–60% 60–70% 70–80% 80–90% ≥90%
U.S. Representative before election
Mike Turner
Republican
Elected U.S. Representative
Mike Turner
Republican

The 10th district encompasses the Dayton metro area, including Dayton and the surrounding suburbs, as well as Springfield. The incumbent was Republican Mike Turner, who was re-elected with 58.4% of the vote in 2020. He was re-elected in 2022.

=== Republican primary ===
==== Candidates ====
===== Nominee =====
- Mike Turner, incumbent U.S. Representative

==== Endorsements ====
Mike Turner

U.S. Executive Branch officials

- Donald Trump, 45th president of the United States (2017–2021)

==== Results ====
Republican primary results
| Party | Candidate | Votes | % |
|---|---|---|---|
| Republican | Mike Turner (incumbent) | 65,734 | 100.0 |
| Total votes | | 65,734 | 100.0 |

=== Democratic primary ===
==== Candidates ====
===== Nominee =====
- David Esrati, veteran, activist and candidate for this seat in 2010 & 2012

===== Eliminated in primary =====
- Kirk Benjamin
- Jeff Hardenbrook
- Baxter Stapleton, filmmaker

==== Results ====
Democratic primary results
| Party | Candidate | Votes | % |
|---|---|---|---|
| Democratic | David Esrati | 10,473 | 31.4 |
| Democratic | Jeff Hardenbrook | 8,633 | 25.9 |
| Democratic | Baxter Stapleton | 8,529 | 25.5 |
| Democratic | Kirk Benjamin | 5,760 | 17.2 |
| Total votes | | 33,395 | 100.0 |

=== General election ===
==== Predictions ====
| Source | Ranking | As of |
|---|---|---|
| The Cook Political Report | Solid R | March 31, 2022 |
| Inside Elections | Solid R | April 22, 2022 |
| Sabato's Crystal Ball | Safe R | April 6, 2022 |
| Politico | Likely R | April 5, 2022 |
| RCP | Safe R | June 9, 2022 |
| Fox News | Solid R | July 11, 2022 |
| DDHQ | Solid R | July 20, 2022 |
| 538 | Solid R | June 30, 2022 |
| The Economist | Safe R | September 28, 2022 |

==== Results ====
2022 Ohio's 10th congressional district election
| Party | Candidate | Votes | % |
|---|---|---|---|
| Republican | Mike Turner (incumbent) | 168,327 | 61.67 |
| Democratic | David Esrati | 104,634 | 38.33 |
| Total votes | | 272,961 | 100.0 |
| Republican hold | | | |

== District 11 ==
2022 Ohio's 11th congressional district election
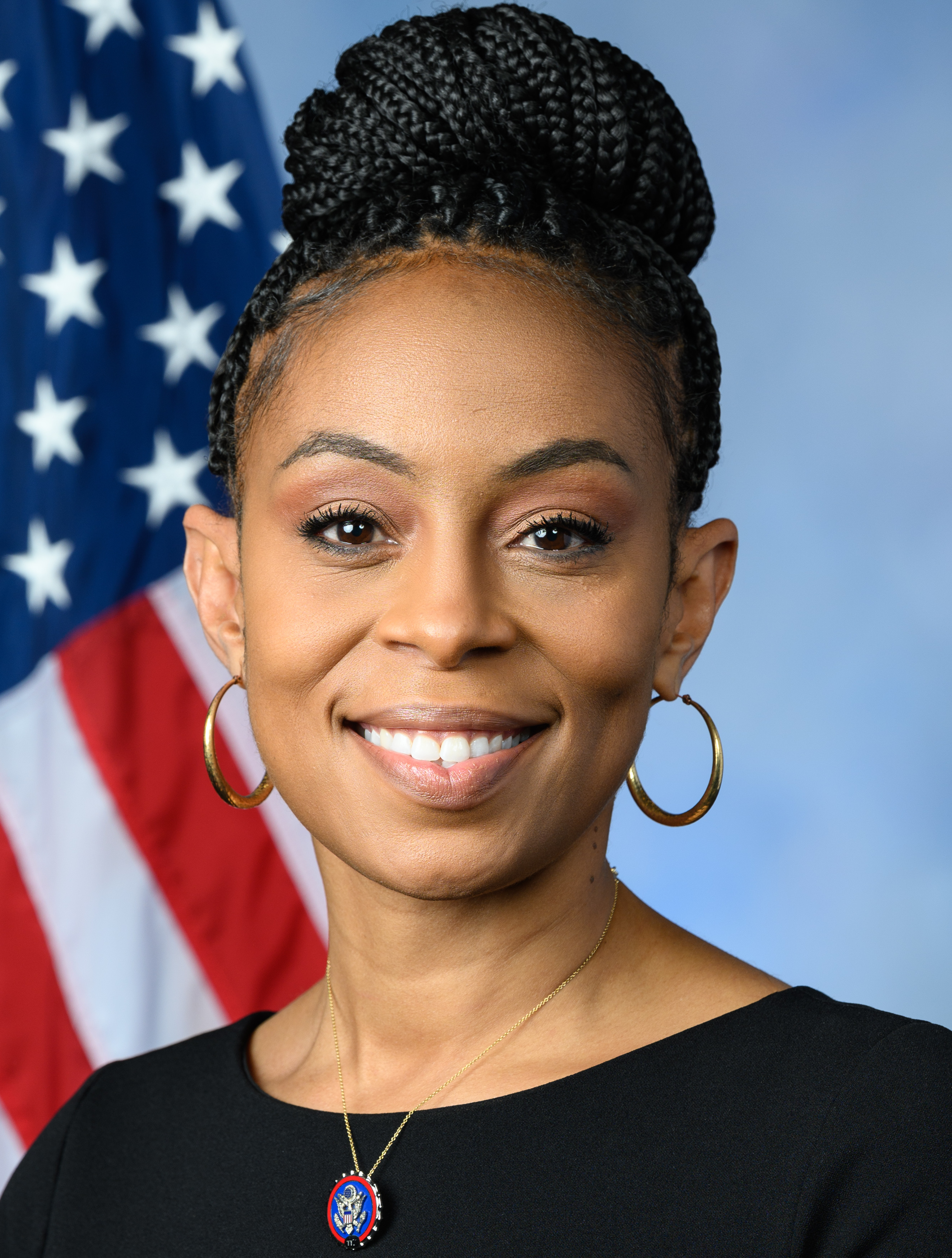

| Nominee | Shontel Brown | Eric Brewer |
| Party | Democratic | Republican |
| Popular vote | 167,722 | 47,988 |
| Percentage | 77.75% | 22.25% |
- Brown: 50–60% 60–70% 70–80% 80–90% ≥90% Brewer: 50–60%
U.S. Representative before election
Shontel Brown
Democratic
Elected U.S. Representative
Shontel Brown
Democratic

The 11th district takes in Cleveland and its inner suburbs, including Euclid, Cleveland Heights, and Warrensville Heights. The incumbent was Democrat Shontel Brown, who was elected with 78.8% of the vote in a 2021 special election after the previous incumbent, Marcia Fudge was appointed as the United States Secretary of Housing and Urban Development.

The Democratic primary was low-profile, especially in contrast to the highly contentious 2021 special election.

The Congressional Progressive Caucus supported Nina Turner in the Democratic primary for Ohio's 11th congressional district special election in 2021 but switched its endorsement for the 2022 Democratic primary.

Brown was re-elected in 2022.

=== Democratic primary ===
==== Candidates ====
===== Nominee =====
- Shontel Brown, incumbent U.S. Representative

===== Eliminated in primary =====
- Nina Turner, president of Our Revolution, former state senator for the 25th district, former Cleveland city councilor, national co-chair of the 2016 and 2020 Bernie Sanders presidential campaigns, and candidate for this seat in 2021

==== Endorsements ====
Shontel Brown

Executive branch officials

- Joe Biden, president of the United States (2021–2025)
- Hillary Clinton, former secretary of state (2009–2013)

U.S. senators

- Sherrod Brown, Ohio (2007–2025)

U.S. representatives

- Jim Clyburn, House majority whip (2007–2011, 2019–2023) from SC-06 (1993–present)
- Hakeem Jeffries, NY-08 (2013–present)
- Nancy Pelosi, speaker of the House (2007–2011, 2019–2023) from CA-12 (1987–present)
- Ritchie Torres, NY-15 (2021–present)
- Nikema Williams, GA-05 (2021–present)

Local officials

- Justin Bibb, mayor of Cleveland (2022–present)

Organizations

- Congressional Black Caucus
- Congressional Progressive Caucus
- Democratic Majority for Israel
- Pro-Israel America
Nina Turner

Executive branch officials

- Robert Reich, former secretary of labor (1993–1997)

U.S. senators

- Bernie Sanders, Vermont (2007–present)

U.S. representatives

- Mary Rose Oakar, former OH-20 (1977–1993)
- Alexandria Ocasio-Cortez, NY-14 (2019–present)

Individuals

- Katrina vanden Heuvel, publisher and editor
- Marianne Williamson, activist and candidate for president in 2020

Organizations

- Brand New Congress
- Democracy for America
- Progressive Democrats of America
- Working Families Party

Newspapers

- The Plain Dealer

==== Results ====
Democratic primary results
| Party | Candidate | Votes | % |
|---|---|---|---|
| Democratic | Shontel Brown (incumbent) | 44,841 | 66.3 |
| Democratic | Nina Turner | 22,830 | 33.7 |
| Total votes | | 67,671 | 100.0 |

=== Republican primary ===
==== Candidates ====
===== Nominee =====
- Eric J. Brewer, former mayor of East Cleveland and candidate for Mayor of Cleveland in 2017

===== Eliminated in primary =====
- James Hemphill

==== Results ====
Republican primary results
| Party | Candidate | Votes | % |
|---|---|---|---|
| Republican | Eric J. Brewer | 8,240 | 57.6 |
| Republican | James Hemphill | 6,062 | 42.4 |
| Total votes | | 14,302 | 100.0 |

=== General election ===
==== Predictions ====
| Source | Ranking | As of |
|---|---|---|
| The Cook Political Report | Solid D | March 31, 2022 |
| Inside Elections | Solid D | April 22, 2022 |
| Sabato's Crystal Ball | Safe D | April 6, 2022 |
| Politico | Solid D | April 5, 2022 |
| RCP | Safe D | June 9, 2022 |
| Fox News | Solid D | July 11, 2022 |
| DDHQ | Solid D | July 20, 2022 |
| 538 | Solid D | June 30, 2022 |
| The Economist | Safe D | September 28, 2022 |

==== Results ====
2022 Ohio's 11th congressional district election
| Party | Candidate | Votes | % |
|---|---|---|---|
| Democratic | Shontel Brown (incumbent) | 167,722 | 77.75 |
| Republican | Eric J. Brewer | 47,988 | 22.25 |
| Total votes | | 215,710 | 100.0 |
| Democratic hold | | | |

== District 12 ==
2022 Ohio's 12th congressional district election
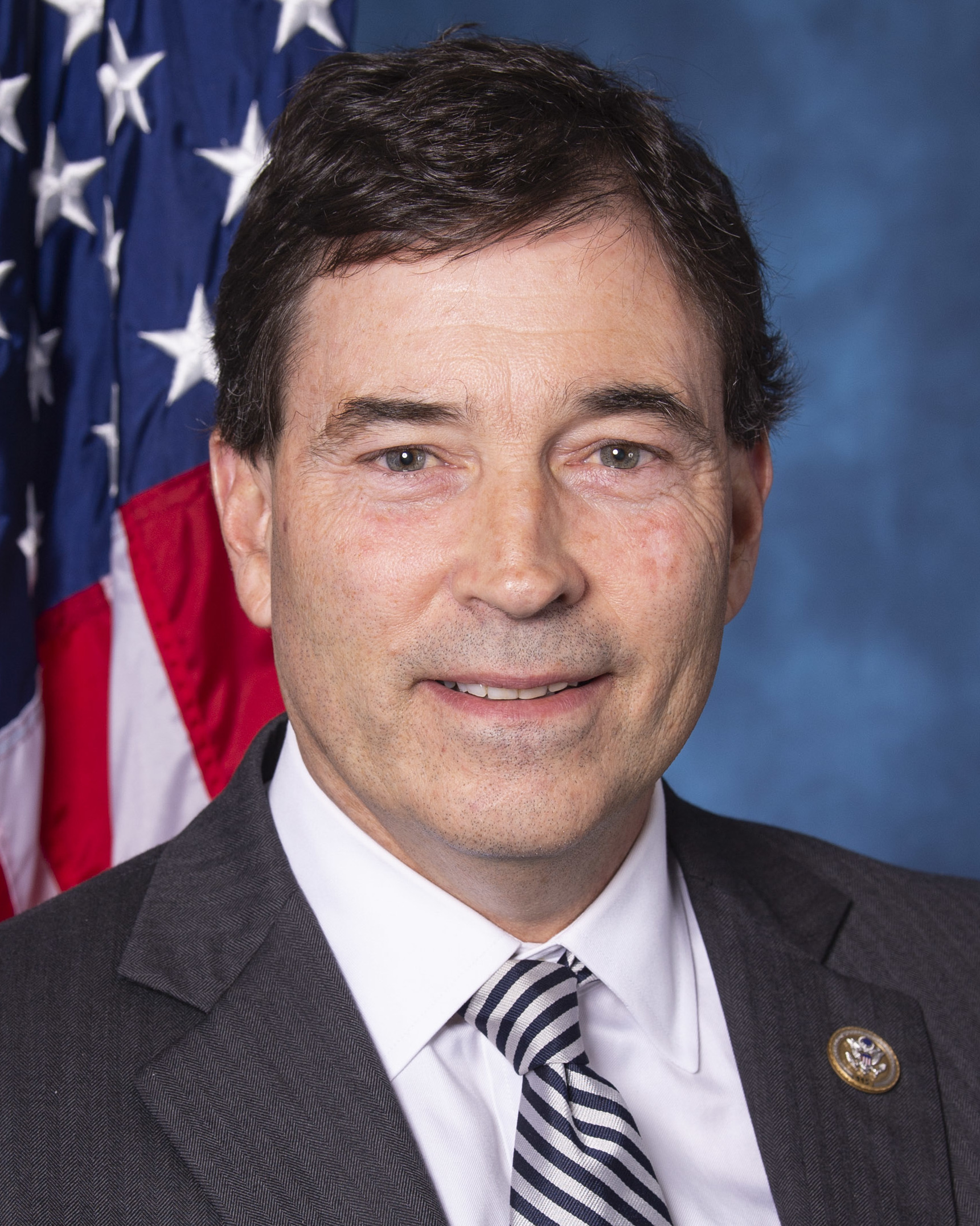

| Nominee | Troy Balderson | Amy Rippel-Elton |
| Party | Republican | Democratic |
| Popular vote | 191,344 | 84,893 |
| Percentage | 69.27% | 30.73% |
- Balderson: 50–60% 60–70% 70–80% 80–90% ≥90% Elton: 50–60% 60–70% 70–80% 80–90% ≥90%
U.S. Representative before election
Troy Balderson
Republican
Elected U.S. Representative
Troy Balderson
Republican

The 12th district encompasses area of Ohio east of the Columbus metro area, taking in Newark, and Zanesville, as well as Athens. The incumbent was Republican Troy Balderson, who was re-elected with 55.2% of the vote in 2020. He was re-elected in 2022.

=== Republican primary ===
==== Candidates ====
===== Nominee =====
- Troy Balderson, incumbent U.S. Representative

===== Eliminated in primary =====
- Brandon Michael Lape

==== Results ====
Republican primary results
| Party | Candidate | Votes | % |
|---|---|---|---|
| Republican | Troy Balderson (incumbent) | 66,181 | 82.3 |
| Republican | Brandon Michael Lape | 14,196 | 17.7 |
| Total votes | | 80,377 | 100.0 |

=== Democratic primary ===
==== Candidates ====
===== Nominee =====
- Amy Rippel-Elton

===== Eliminated in primary =====
- Michael Fletcher

===== Withdrawn =====
- Alaina Shearer, businesswoman and nominee for this seat in 2020

==== Results ====
Democratic primary results
| Party | Candidate | Votes | % |
|---|---|---|---|
| Democratic | Amy Rippel-Elton | 12,712 | 56.7 |
| Democratic | Michael Fletcher | 9,717 | 43.3 |
| Total votes | | 22,429 | 100.0 |

=== General election ===
==== Predictions ====
| Source | Ranking | As of |
|---|---|---|
| The Cook Political Report | Solid R | March 31, 2022 |
| Inside Elections | Solid R | April 22, 2022 |
| Sabato's Crystal Ball | Safe R | April 6, 2022 |
| Politico | Solid R | April 5, 2022 |
| RCP | Safe R | June 9, 2022 |
| Fox News | Solid R | July 11, 2022 |
| DDHQ | Solid R | July 20, 2022 |
| 538 | Solid R | June 30, 2022 |
| The Economist | Safe R | September 28, 2022 |

==== Results ====
2022 Ohio's 12th congressional district election
| Party | Candidate | Votes | % |
|---|---|---|---|
| Republican | Troy Balderson (incumbent) | 191,344 | 69.27 |
| Democratic | Amy Rippel-Elton | 84,893 | 30.73 |
| Total votes | | 276,237 | 100.0 |
| Republican hold | | | |

== District 13 ==
2022 Ohio's 13th congressional district election
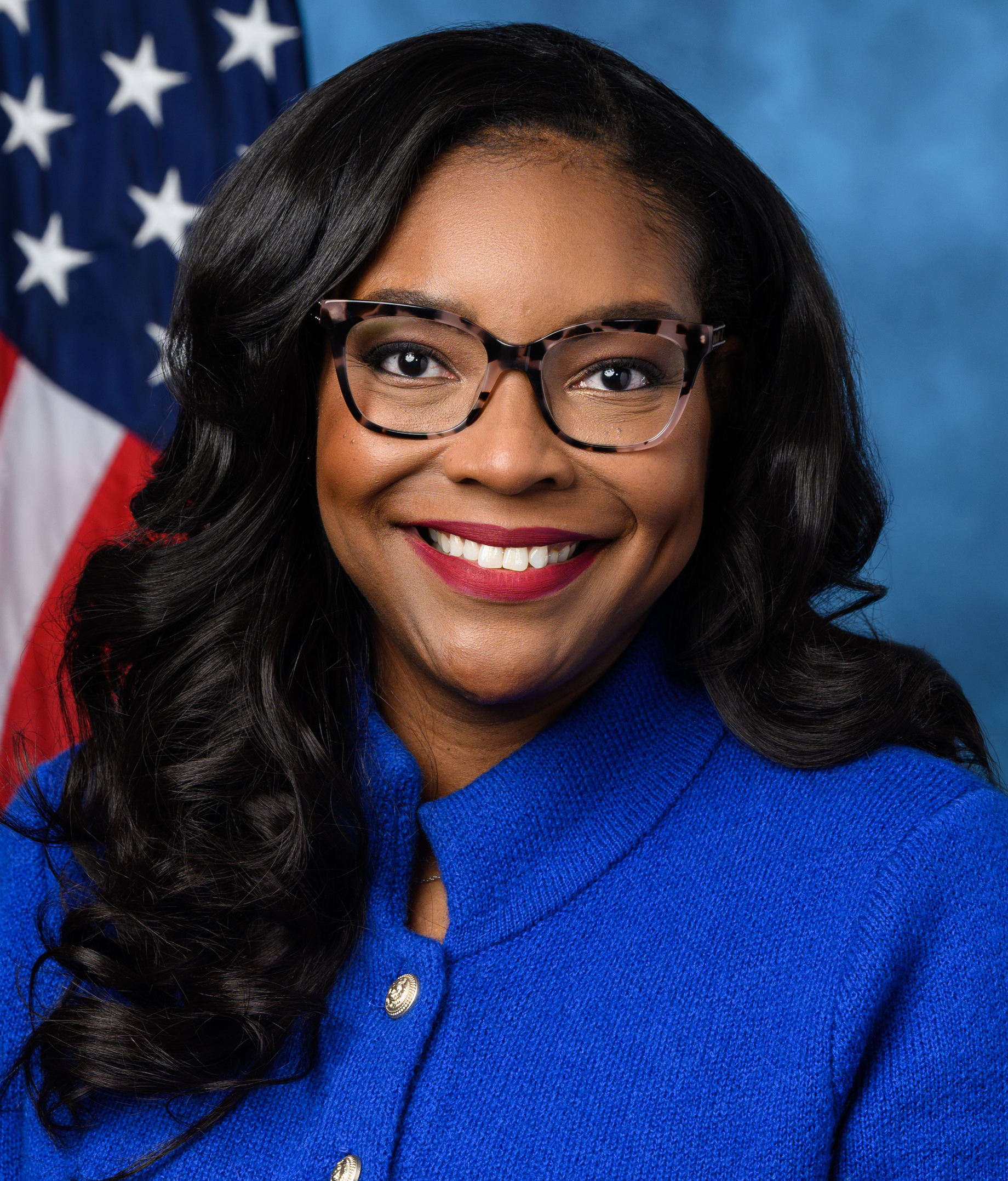

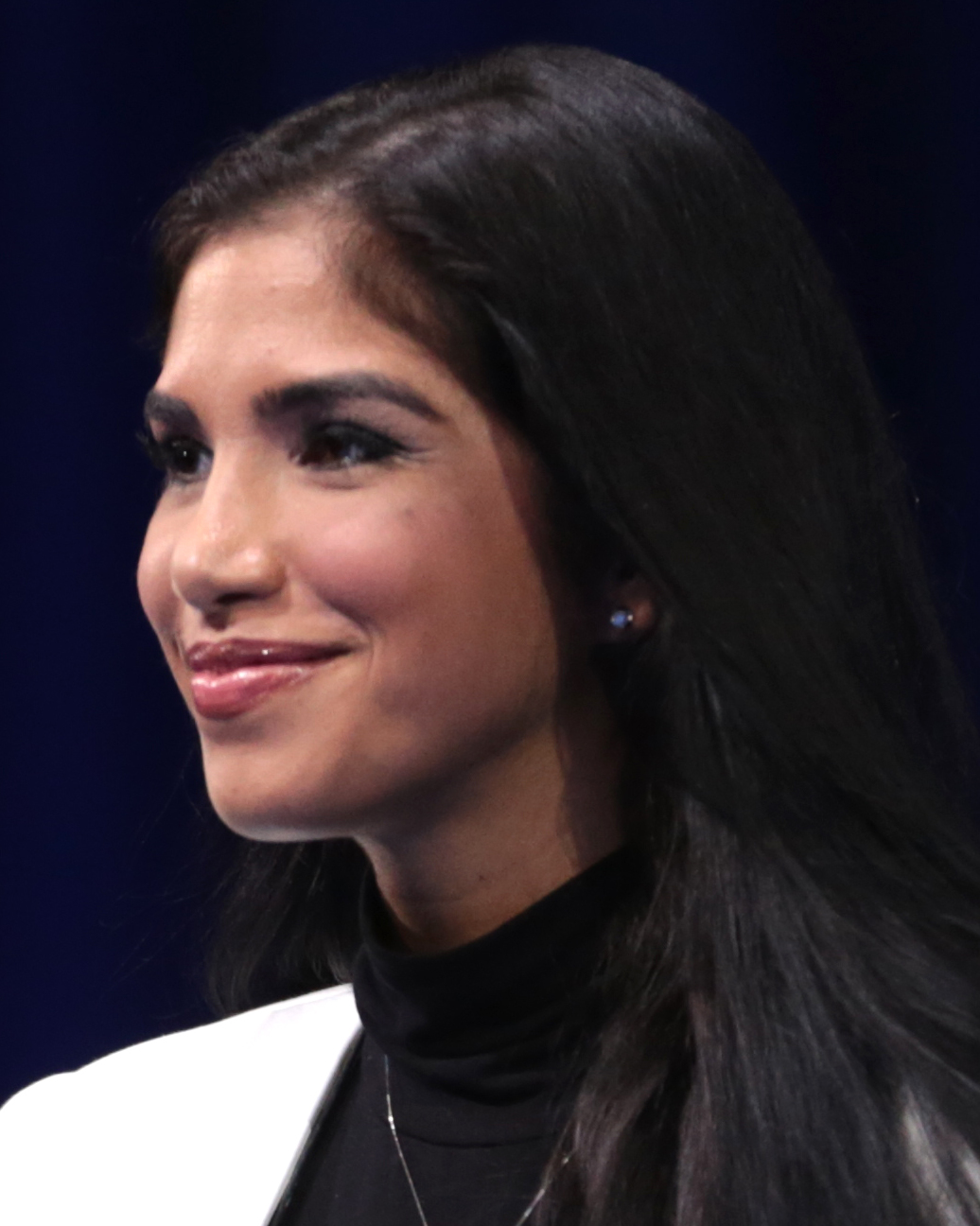
| Nominee | Emilia Sykes | Madison Gesiotto Gilbert |
| Party | Democratic | Republican |
| Popular vote | 149,816 | 134,593 |
| Percentage | 52.68% | 47.32% |
- Sykes: 50–60% 60–70% 70–80% 80–90% ≥90% Gilbert: 50–60% 60–70% 70–80% 80–90%
U.S. Representative before election
Tim Ryan
Democratic
Elected U.S. Representative
Emilia Sykes
Democratic

The 13th district includes most of the Akron - Canton population corridor. The incumbent was Democrat Tim Ryan, who was re-elected with 52.5% in 2020. On April 26, 2021, Ryan announced that he would seek the U.S. Senate seat being vacated by two-term senator Rob Portman.

This district was included on the list of Democratic-held seats the National Republican Congressional Committee targeted in 2022. The seat was altered significantly due to redistricting, now including all of Summit County and switching out parts of the Mahoning Valley for Canton. Despite this, it remains a Democratic leaning swing seat. Sykes won the election in 2022.

=== Democratic primary ===
==== Candidates ====
===== Nominee =====
- Emilia Sykes, state representative from 34th district and former House Minority Leader

===== Declined =====
- Tim Ryan, incumbent U.S. Representative (ran for U.S. Senate)

==== Endorsements ====
Emilia Sykes

Organizations

- Democracy for America
- Human Rights Campaign PAC
- League of Conservation Voters
- NARAL Pro-Choice America
- New Democrat Coalition Action Fund
- Planned Parenthood Action Fund
- Sierra Club

Labor unions

- Communications Workers of America

==== Results ====
Democratic primary results
| Party | Candidate | Votes | % |
|---|---|---|---|
| Democratic | Emilia Sykes | 36,251 | 100.0 |
| Total votes | | 36,251 | 100.0 |

=== Republican primary ===
==== Candidates ====
===== Nominee =====
- Madison Gesiotto Gilbert, 2014 Miss Ohio USA, political commentator, and lawyer

===== Eliminated in primary =====
- Shay Hawkins, leader of the Opportunity Funds Association and former aide to U.S. Senator Tim Scott
- Santana F. King
- Janet Porter, anti-abortion activist and author
- Dante N. Sabatucci
- Ryan Saylor
- Greg Wheeler, attorney

==== Endorsements ====
Madison Gesiotto Gilbert

U.S. Executive Branch officials

- Donald Trump, 45th president of the United States (2017–2021)

U.S. Representatives

- Kat Cammack, U.S. Representative for Florida's 3rd congressional district (2021–present)
- Elise Stefanik, U.S. Representative for New York's 21st congressional district (2015–present)

Organizations

- American Conservative Union
Janet Porter

Governors

- Mike Huckabee, former governor of Arkansas (1996–2007)

U.S. Representatives

- Tom DeLay, former U.S. Representative for Texas's 22nd congressional district (1985–2006) and former House Majority Leader (2003–2005)
- Bob McEwen, former U.S. Representative for Ohio's 6th congressional district (1981–1993)
Greg Wheeler

Newspapers and other media

- The Plain Dealer (Republican primary only)

==== Results ====
Republican primary results
| Party | Candidate | Votes | % |
|---|---|---|---|
| Republican | Madison Gesiotto Gilbert | 16,211 | 28.6 |
| Republican | Greg Wheeler | 13,284 | 23.4 |
| Republican | Janet Porter | 9,402 | 16.6 |
| Republican | Shay Hawkins | 6,468 | 11.4 |
| Republican | Ryan Saylor | 5,261 | 9.3 |
| Republican | Dante N. Sabatucci | 4,740 | 8.4 |
| Republican | Santana F. King | 1,338 | 2.4 |
| Total votes | | 56,704 | 100.0 |

=== General election ===
==== Predictions ====
| Source | Ranking | As of |
|---|---|---|
| The Cook Political Report | Tossup | March 31, 2022 |
| Inside Elections | Tossup | August 25, 2022 |
| Sabato's Crystal Ball | Lean R (flip) | November 7, 2022 |
| Politico | Tossup | October 3, 2022 |
| RCP | Lean R (flip) | June 9, 2022 |
| Fox News | Tossup | July 11, 2022 |
| DDHQ | Likely R (flip) | July 20, 2022 |
| 538 | Likely R (flip) | June 30, 2022 |
| The Economist | Tossup | November 1, 2022 |

==== Polling ====
Graphical summary

| Poll source | Date(s) administered | Sample size | Margin of error | Emilia Sykes (D) | Madison Gesiotto Gilbert (R) | Undecided |
|---|---|---|---|---|---|---|
| Wick/RRH Elections (R) | October 23–26, 2022 | 525 (LV) | ± 4% | 46% | 44% | 10% |
| GQR Research (D) (Note: This poll was sponsored by Sykes's campaign) | May 23–31, 2022 | 500 (LV) | ± 4.4% | 47% | 45% | 9% |
| RMG Research (Note: This poll was sponsored by U.S. Term Limits) | May 19–20, 2022 | 500 (LV) | ± 4.5% | 37% | 46% | 16% |

Hypothetical polling

Generic Democrat vs. generic Republican

| Poll source | Date(s) administered | Sample size | Margin of error | Generic Republican | Generic Democrat | Undecided |
|---|---|---|---|---|---|---|
| Change Research (D) | October 19, 2022 | – | – | 46% | 43% | 11% |

==== Results ====
Despite many election forecasters stating Republicans were slightly favored to flip it, Sykes held the district in Democratic hands and defeated Gesiotto Gilbert by 5 percentage points. Had the map been enacted in time for the 2020 presidential election, Joe Biden would have carried the district by 3 percentage points.

2022 Ohio's 13th congressional district election
| Party | Candidate | Votes | % |
|---|---|---|---|
| Democratic | Emilia Sykes | 149,816 | 52.68 |
| Republican | Madison Gesiotto Gilbert | 134,593 | 47.32 |
| Total votes | | 284,409 | 100.0 |
| Democratic hold | | | |

== District 14 ==
2022 Ohio's 14th congressional district election
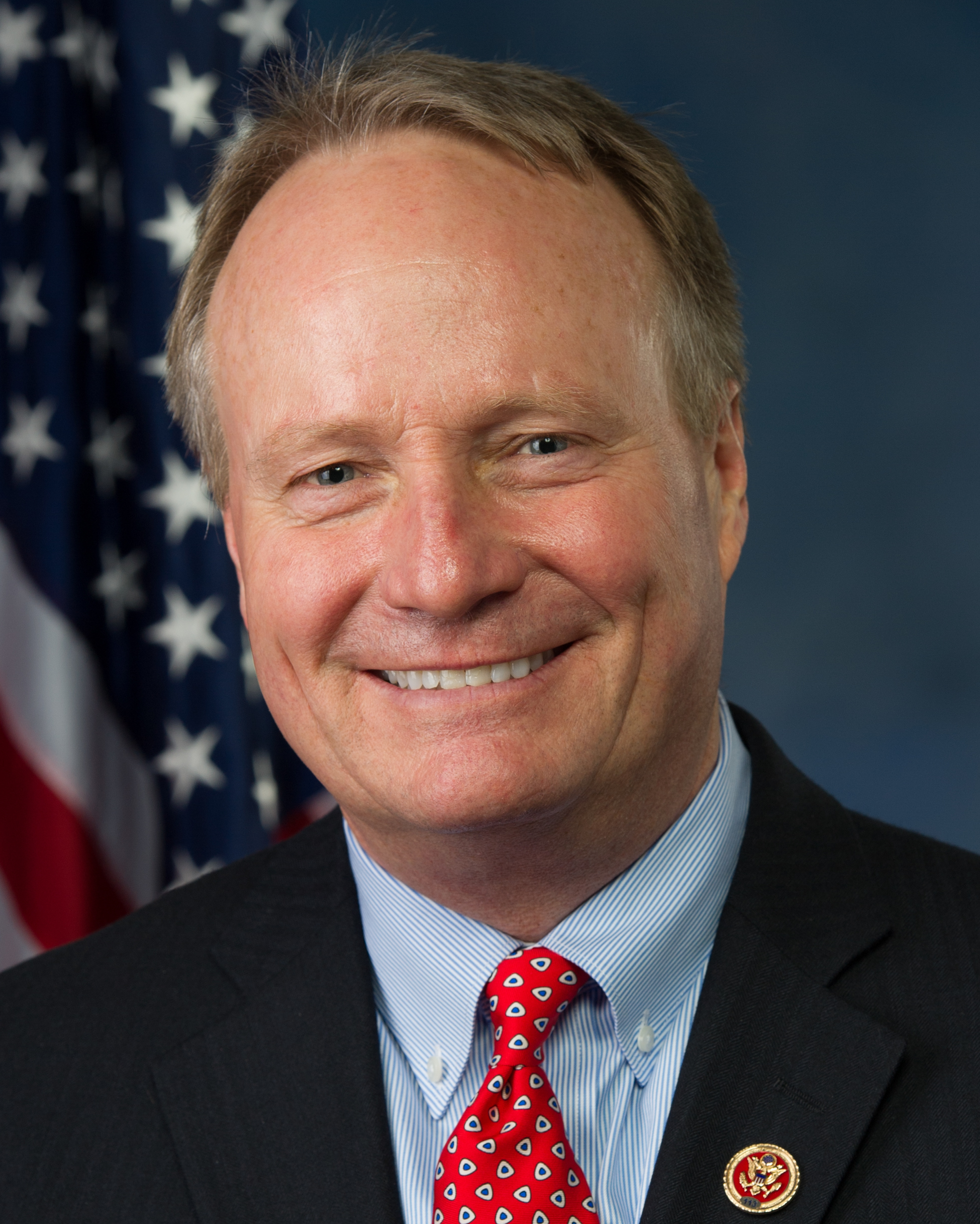

| Nominee | David Joyce | Matt Kilboy |
| Party | Republican | Democratic |
| Popular vote | 183,389 | 113,639 |
| Percentage | 61.74% | 38.26% |
- Joyce: 50–60% 60–70% 70–80% 80–90% ≥90% Kilboy: 50–60% 60–70% 70–80% 80–90% ≥90%
U.S. Representative before election
David Joyce
Republican
Elected U.S. Representative
David Joyce
Republican

The 14th district is located in Northeast Ohio, taking in the eastern suburbs and exurbs of Cleveland, Ohio. The incumbent was Republican David Joyce, who was re-elected with 60.1% of the vote in 2020. He was re-elected in 2022.

=== Republican primary ===
==== Candidates ====
===== Nominee =====
- David Joyce, incumbent U.S. Representative

===== Eliminated in primary =====
- Patrick Awtrey, businessman
- Bevin Cormack, insurance agent

=== Endorsements ===
David Joyce

Organizations

- Citizens for Responsible Energy Solutions
- National Rifle Association-Political Victory Fund
- Pro-Israel America

==== Results ====
Republican primary results
| Party | Candidate | Votes | % |
|---|---|---|---|
| Republican | David Joyce (incumbent) | 58,042 | 75.7 |
| Republican | Patrick Awtrey | 12,296 | 16.0 |
| Republican | Bevin Cormack | 6,364 | 8.3 |
| Total votes | | 76,702 | 100.0 |

=== Democratic primary ===
==== Candidates ====
===== Nominee =====
- Matt Kilboy, consultant, nurse, veteran

==== Results ====
Democratic primary results
| Party | Candidate | Votes | % |
|---|---|---|---|
| Democratic | Matt Kilboy | 34,499 | 100.0 |
| Total votes | | 34,499 | 100.0 |

=== General election ===
==== Predictions ====
| Source | Ranking | As of |
|---|---|---|
| The Cook Political Report | Solid R | March 31, 2022 |
| Inside Elections | Solid R | April 22, 2022 |
| Sabato's Crystal Ball | Safe R | April 6, 2022 |
| Politico | Solid R | April 5, 2022 |
| RCP | Safe R | June 9, 2022 |
| Fox News | Solid R | July 11, 2022 |
| DDHQ | Solid R | July 20, 2022 |
| 538 | Solid R | June 30, 2022 |
| The Economist | Safe R | September 28, 2022 |

==== Results ====
2022 Ohio's 14th congressional district election
| Party | Candidate | Votes | % |
|---|---|---|---|
| Republican | David Joyce (incumbent) | 183,389 | 61.74 |
| Democratic | Matt Kilboy | 113,639 | 38.26 |
| Total votes | | 297,028 | 100.0 |
| Republican hold | | | |

== District 15 ==
2022 Ohio's 15th congressional district election
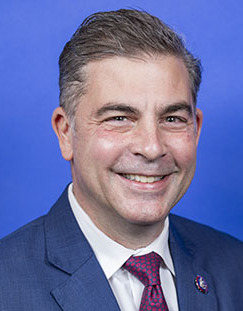

| Nominee | Mike Carey | Gary Josephson |
| Party | Republican | Democratic |
| Popular vote | 143,112 | 108,139 |
| Percentage | 56.96% | 43.04% |
- Carey: 50–60% 60–70% 70–80% 80–90% ≥90% Josephson: 50–60% 60–70% 70–80% 80–90% ≥90%
U.S. Representative before election
Mike Carey
Republican
Elected U.S. Representative
Mike Carey
Republican

The 15th district encompasses the southwestern Columbus metro area, taking in the western, southern, and some northern suburbs of Columbus, including Dublin, Hilliard, and Grove City. The incumbent was Republican Mike Carey, who was elected with 58.3% of the vote in a 2021 special election after the previous incumbent, Steve Stivers, resigned to take a job as president and CEO of the Ohio Chamber of Commerce. He was re-elected in 2022.

=== Republican primary ===
==== Candidates ====
===== Nominee =====
- Mike Carey, incumbent U.S. Representative

Endorsements

Mike Carey

Organizations

- American Conservative Union

==== Results ====
Republican primary results
| Party | Candidate | Votes | % |
|---|---|---|---|
| Republican | Mike Carey (incumbent) | 48,938 | 100.0 |
| Total votes | | 48,938 | 100.0 |

=== Democratic primary ===
==== Nominee ====
- Gary Josephson, activist

==== Withdrawn ====
- Danny O'Connor, Franklin County Recorder, nominee for Ohio's 12th congressional district in the 2018 special and general elections

==== Results ====
Democratic primary results
| Party | Candidate | Votes | % |
|---|---|---|---|
| Democratic | Gary Josephson | 9,047 | 97.0 |
| Democratic | Danny O'Connor (withdrawn) | 284 | 3.0 |
| Total votes | | 9,331 | 100.0 |

=== General election ===
==== Predictions ====
| Source | Ranking | As of |
|---|---|---|
| The Cook Political Report | Solid R | March 31, 2022 |
| Inside Elections | Solid R | April 22, 2022 |
| Sabato's Crystal Ball | Safe R | April 6, 2022 |
| Politico | Likely R | April 5, 2022 |
| RCP | Safe R | June 9, 2022 |
| Fox News | Solid R | July 11, 2022 |
| DDHQ | Solid R | July 20, 2022 |
| 538 | Solid R | June 30, 2022 |
| The Economist | Safe R | September 28, 2022 |

==== Results ====
Ohio's 15th congressional district, 2022
| Party | Candidate | Votes | % |
|---|---|---|---|
| Republican | Mike Carey (incumbent) | 143,112 | 56.96 |
| Democratic | Gary Josephson | 108,139 | 43.04 |
| Total votes | | 251,251 | 100.0 |
| Republican hold | | | |

== Notes ==
Partisan clients
