= Marcus Gilbert (American football) =

American football player (born 1988)

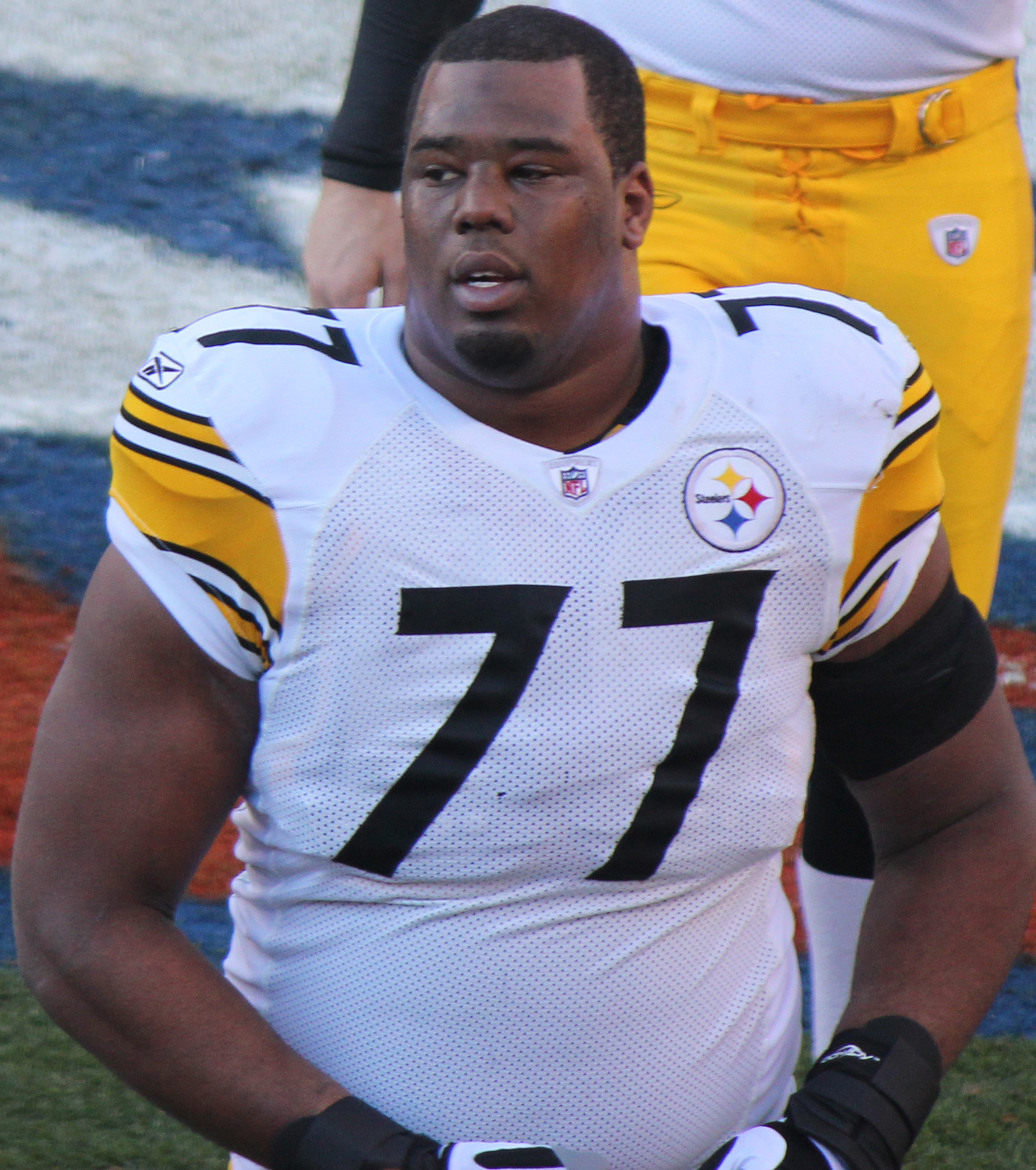
- Gilbert with the Pittsburgh Steelers in 2011

No. 77, 76
- Position: Offensive tackle

Personal information
- Born: February 15, 1988 (age 38); Fort Lauderdale, Florida, U.S.
- Listed height: 6 ft 6 in (1.98 m)
- Listed weight: 330 lb (150 kg)

Career information
- High school: St. Thomas Aquinas (Fort Lauderdale)
- College: Florida
- NFL draft: 2011: 2nd round, 63rd overall pick

Career history
- Pittsburgh Steelers (2011–2018); Arizona Cardinals (2019–2020)

Awards and highlights
- 2× BCS national champion (2007, 2009)

Career NFL statistics
- Games played: 88
- Games started: 87
- Stats at Pro Football Reference

Marcus Christopher Gilbert (born February 15, 1988) is an American former professional football player who was an offensive tackle in the National Football League (NFL). He played college football for the Florida Gators, and was a member of a BCS National Championship team. He was selected by the Pittsburgh Steelers in the second round of the 2011 NFL draft and played for the Steelers for eight seasons. Gilbert was also a member of the Arizona Cardinals for two seasons, although he never played a game for the team.

== Early life ==
Gilbert was born in Fort Lauderdale, Florida. He attended St. Thomas Aquinas High School in Fort Lauderdale, and was a standout lineman for the St. Thomas Aquinas Raiders high school football team. He was also a member of the Raiders basketball team and threw the shot put and discus for the Raiders track and field team. Gilbert's father Jeff was a Secret Service agent who protected Barack Obama during his 2008 presidential campaign.

== College career ==
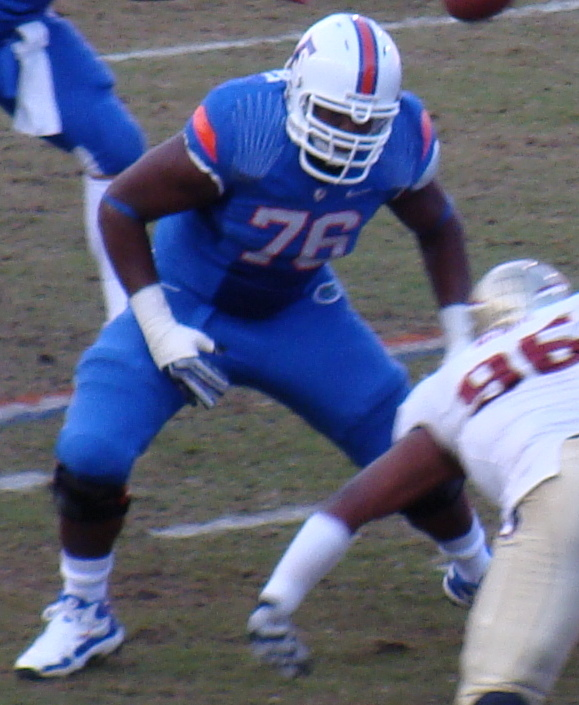
Gilbert with Florida in 2009

Gilbert attended the University of Florida, where he played on coach Urban Meyer's Florida Gators football team from 2006 to 2010. As a true freshman in 2006, he was redshirted. He made his first career start for the Florida Gators in a game against Florida Atlantic in 2007 at right guard in place of the injured Maurkice Pouncey. During the Gators 2008 BCS National Championship season, Gilbert started two games at left guard against Hawaii and Miami. He started in all 14 games for the Gators at right tackle in 2009, and earned SEC Offensive Lineman of the Week honors for his performance against Kentucky on September 26. In 2010, Gilbert started in all 13 games, playing both tackle positions. During his college career, he appeared in fifty-two games and started thirty of them.

== Professional career ==
=== Pre-draft ===
Entering the 2011 NFL draft, Gilbert was projected to be a third to fourth round pick. He was ranked as the ninth best offensive tackle in the draft and was invited to the NFL Combine. Gilbert attended the scouting combine and performed nearly half the drills before injuring a hamstring. He participated at Florida State's Pro Day and nearly finished the entire workout before reinjuring his hamstring during a 40-yard dash.

Pre-draft measurables
Height	Weight	Arm length	Hand span	Wingspan	40-yard dash	10-yard split	20-yard split	20-yard shuttle	Vertical jump	Broad jump	Bench press
6 ft 6 1/8 in (1.98 m)	330 lb (150 kg)	33 1/2 in (0.85 m)	9 3/4 in (0.25 m)	6 ft 8 3/4 in (2.05 m)	5.46 s	1.93 s	3.14 s	5.02 s	30.5 in (0.77 m)	8 ft 2 in (2.49 m)	30 reps
All values from NFL Combine/Florida's Pro Day

=== Pittsburgh Steelers ===
==== 2011 ====
The Pittsburgh Steelers selected Gilbert second round (63rd overall) of the 2011 NFL draft. Gilbert was the ninth offensive tackle selected in the 2011 NFL Draft, where being chosen by the Pittsburgh Steelers reunited him with his former Florida teammate Maurkice Pouncey. He was the first offensive tackle drafted from Florida since the Pittsburgh Steelers selected Max Starks in 2004. On July 19, 2011, the Pittsburgh Steelers signed Gilbert to a four-year, $3.22 million contract with a signing bonus of $847,208.

He entered training camp competing with Willie Colon, Max Starks, Jonathan Scott, and Chris Scott for a starting offensive tackle position. He was named the backup left tackle to Jonathan Scott to begin the regular season. September 18, 2011, Gilbert made his professional regular season debut and his first career start in a 24–0 victory over the Seattle Seahawks. He was named the starting right tackle after Willie Colon was placed on injured-reserve after tearing his triceps during the season-opener against the Baltimore Ravens. During a Week 5 matchup against the Tennessee Titans, Gilbert let the game after suffering a shoulder injury and was replaced at right tackle by Jonathan Scott. He re-aggravated the shoulder during the week and missed the Pittsburgh Steeler's Week 6 victory over the Jacksonville Jaguars. On December 29, 2011, Gilbert was named the Steelers' Rookie of the Year after starting 13 games in place of the injured Colon. He finished his rookie season with 13 starts in 14 games played, helping the Pittsburgh Steelers achieve a 12–4 record and finish second in the AFC North On January 8, 2012, he started at right tackle in his first career playoff games in a 29–23 overtime loss to the Denver Broncos in the AFC Wildcard game.

==== 2012 ====
During the Pittsburgh Steeler's training camp in 2012, Gilbert competed with veterans Max Starks, Chris Scott and rookies Mike Adams and Kelvin Beachum for a starting tackle position. He defeated Scott, Beachum, and Adams to win the starting right tackle job to begin the regular season. On October 11, 2012, Gilbert went down clutching his knee and was carted off the field during the second quarter of a 26–23 loss to the Tennessee Titans. On November 26, 2012, Gilbert was placed on injured reserve with torn tendons in his ankle that he suffered during Week 5 against the Titans. His season was held to five starts due to this injury.

==== 2013 ====
He started the 2013 regular season as the Pittsburgh Steeler's right tackle. He started all 16 regular season games, marking his first complete season and was ranked the 44th best offensive tackle by Pro Football Focus after allowing 11 sacks.

==== 2014 ====
On August 19, 2014, Gilbert signed a five-year, $30.81 million contract extension with the Steelers with a $7.65 million signing bonus. On October 20, 2014, Gilbert suffered a concussion and left during the second quarter of 30–23 victory over the Houston Texans on Monday Night Football. He was ruled out for the next game against the Indianapolis Colts. He was limited to 12 starts in 2014 after he missed Weeks 13, 14, and 15 after suffering an ankle injury during practice and was replaced by Mike Adams for those three games. He finished the season ranking tenth among right tackles with a grade of 94.7 in pass blocking efficiency by Pro Football Focus and 20th among all qualifying offensive tackles and only allowed six sacks, four hits, and 19 hurries in 440 pass blocking snaps. He earned an overall grade of 74.7 by PFF for the 2014 season.

==== 2015 ====
On February 25, 2015, the Pittsburgh Steelers and Gilbert agreed to restructure his 2015 salary and convert his $1.15 million base salary and $3.5 roster bonus into a signing bonus.

Gilbert was able to start all 16 regular season games in 2015 and played in 99.5% of the offensive snaps. He was responsible for only one sack, two hits, and ranked as the best right tackle by Pro Football Focus. He attributed his best season statistically to having a better off season program, being more health conscious, and getting into better shape. The Pittsburgh Steelers achieved a 10–6 record and finished second in the AFC North. After winning the AFC Wildcard they lost to the eventual Super Bowl 50 Champions the Denver Broncos.

==== 2016 ====
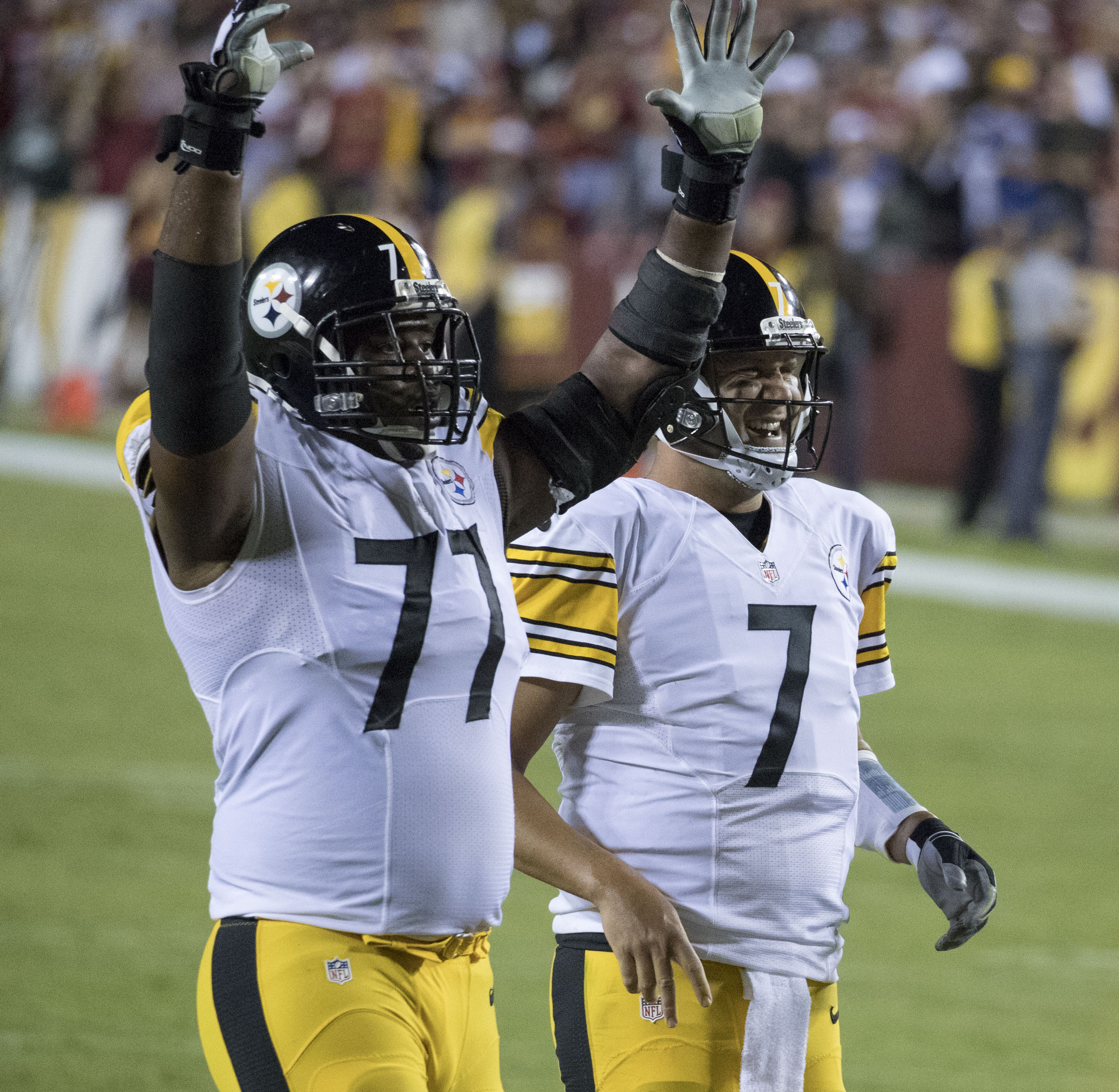
Gilbert and Ben Roethlisberger in 2016

On August 15, 2016, the Steelers and Gilbert agreed to restructure $3.19 million of his 2016 salary into a bonus in order to clear $2.39 million in cap space.

He started the first four games of the season and injured his ankle during a Week 4 victory over the Kansas City Chiefs. He missed the next three games but was able to return in time for Week 7 contest against the New England Patriots. Gilbert started 13 games and finished the season ranked the 13th best offensive tackle by Pro Football Focus with an overall grade of 87.1.

==== 2017 ====
On September 17, 2017, Gilbert suffered a hamstring injury during a 26–9 victory over the Minnesota Vikings. He missed Weeks 3-5 due to the injury and led to Chris Hubbard starting at right tackle in his absence. He returned on October 15, 2017, but left the game after reinjuring his hamstring during a 19–13 win against the Kansas City Chiefs. Gilbert missed the next two games after suffering the setback. On November 20, 2017, Gilbert was suspended for four games for violating the NFL's policy on performance-enhancing substance.

==== 2018 ====
Gilbert started five of the first six games before missing Weeks 8–14 with a knee injury. He was ultimately placed on injured reserve on December 15, 2018.

=== Arizona Cardinals ===
On March 8, 2019, the Steelers agreed to trade Gilbert to the Arizona Cardinals in exchange for a compensatory sixth round pick. The deal became official on March 13, 2019. He was placed on injured reserve on September 10, 2019, with a knee injury.

On March 30, 2020, Gilbert re-signed with the Cardinals. He was placed on the active/non-football illness list at the start of training camp on August 2, 2020. Two days later, Gilbert announced he would opt-out of the 2020 season due to the COVID-19 pandemic. He announced his retirement following the season on April 26, 2021.

== Personal life ==
On February 22, 2021, Gilbert married political commentator, congressional candidate and former Miss Ohio Madison Gesiotto. He was baptized into the Catholic Church on April 17, 2022.

== See also ==
- List of Florida Gators in the NFL draft
