= Chris Hubbard =

American football player (born 1991)

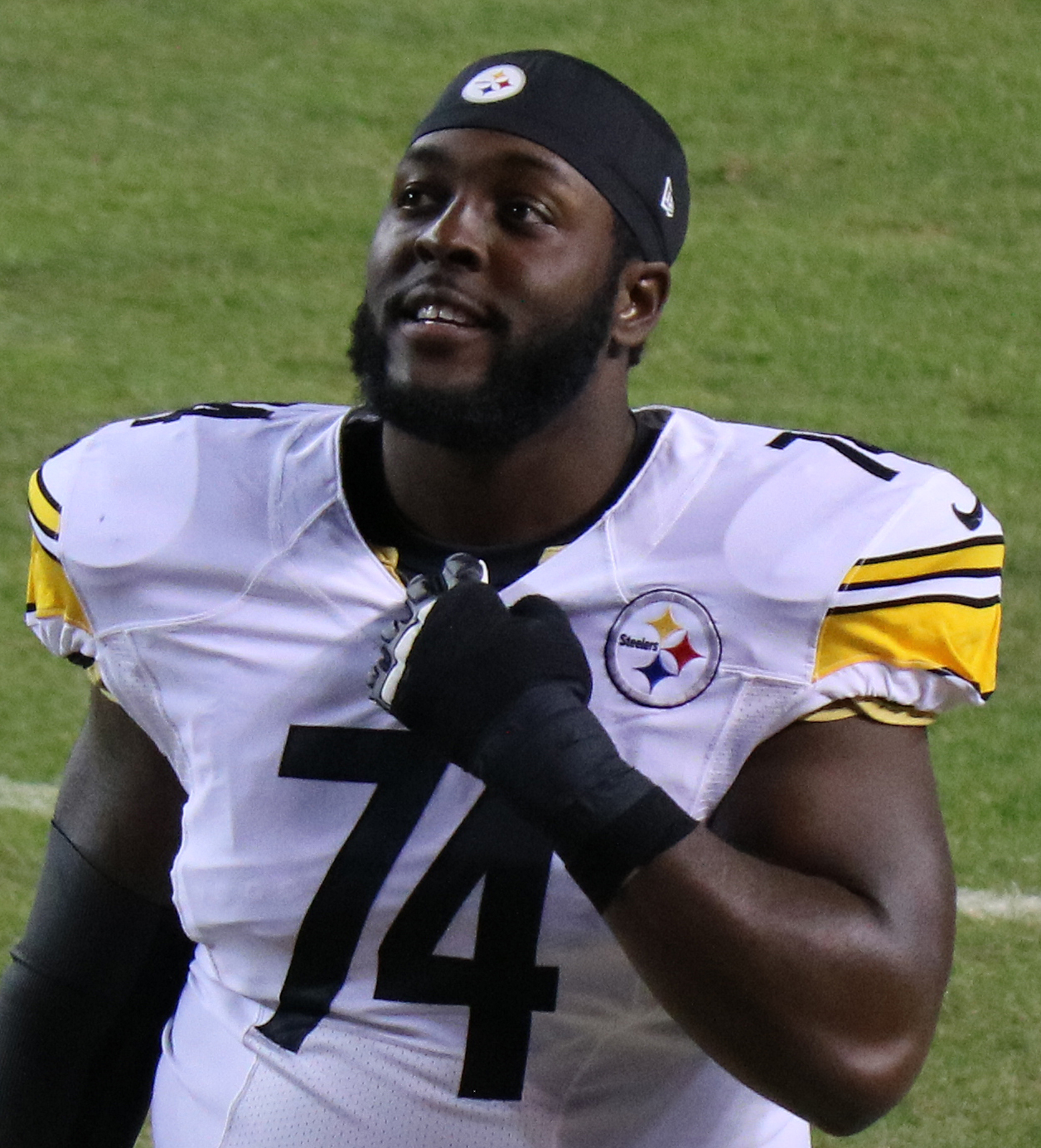
- Hubbard with the Pittsburgh Steelers in 2015

Profile
- Position: Offensive tackle

Personal information
- Born: April 23, 1991 (age 35); Columbus, Georgia, U.S.
- Listed height: 6 ft 4 in (1.93 m)
- Listed weight: 295 lb (134 kg)

Career information
- High school: Carver (Columbus)
- College: UAB (2009–2012)
- NFL draft: 2013: undrafted

Career history
- Pittsburgh Steelers (2013–2017); Cleveland Browns (2018–2022); Tennessee Titans (2023); San Francisco 49ers (2024)*; New York Giants (2024); Detroit Lions (2025)
- * Offseason or practice squad member only

Awards and highlights
- First-team All-C-USA (2012); C-USA All-Freshman Team (2009)

Career NFL statistics
- Games played: 103
- Games started: 62
- Stats at Pro Football Reference

Christopher E. Hubbard (born April 23, 1991) is an American professional football offensive tackle. He played college football for the UAB Blazers.

== Early life ==
Hubbard played high school football at George Washington Carver High School in Columbus, Georgia. He started at left tackle his junior and senior years as the team went 26–3 and won the 2007 Georgia High School Association Class AAA state championship. He was named to the Columbus Ledger-Enquirer All-City team, the Associated Press Class AAA first-team All-State team, and recorded 77 pancake blocks his senior year.

== College career ==
Hubbard played for the UAB Blazers of the University of Alabama at Birmingham from 2009 to 2012. He was named to the Conference USA All-Freshman team in 2009. He was an All-Conference USA selection as a senior year in 2012.

== Professional career ==
Pre-draft measurables
Height	Weight	Arm length	Hand span	40-yard dash	10-yard split	20-yard split	20-yard shuttle	Three-cone drill	Vertical jump	Broad jump	Bench press
6 ft 3 1/2 in (1.92 m)	286 lb (130 kg)	30 3/4 in (0.78 m)	9 1/4 in (0.23 m)	4.95 s	1.68 s	2.74 s	4.69 s	7.52 s	28.5 in (0.72 m)	9 ft 0 in (2.74 m)	21 reps
All values from Alabama Pro Day

=== Pittsburgh Steelers ===
On April 27, 2013, the Pittsburgh Steelers signed Hubbard as an undrafted free agent after going undrafted in the 2013 NFL draft. He was released by the Steelers on August 31, 2013. He was signed to the Steelers' practice squad on September 3, 2013. Hubbard was signed to a future contract on December 31, 2013. He made his NFL debut on September 21, 2014, against the Carolina Panthers. Hubbard was cut by the Steelers on August 19, 2016.

On October 9, 2016, he received his first career start against the New York Jets after right tackle Marcus Gilbert was unable to play due to injury. He played 76 offensive snaps as the Steelers won 31–13. He received a lot of praise for his performance from coaches Mike Tomlin, Todd Haley, and quarterback Ben Roethlisberger. He received his second start on October 23, against the New England Patriots.

Hubbard began the 2017 season as the backup right tackle behind Marcus Gilbert. On September 24, 2017, Hubbard received his first start of the season in place of right tackle Marcus Gilbert, who was out with an injured hamstring. He went on to start the five of the next six games at right tackle.

=== Cleveland Browns ===
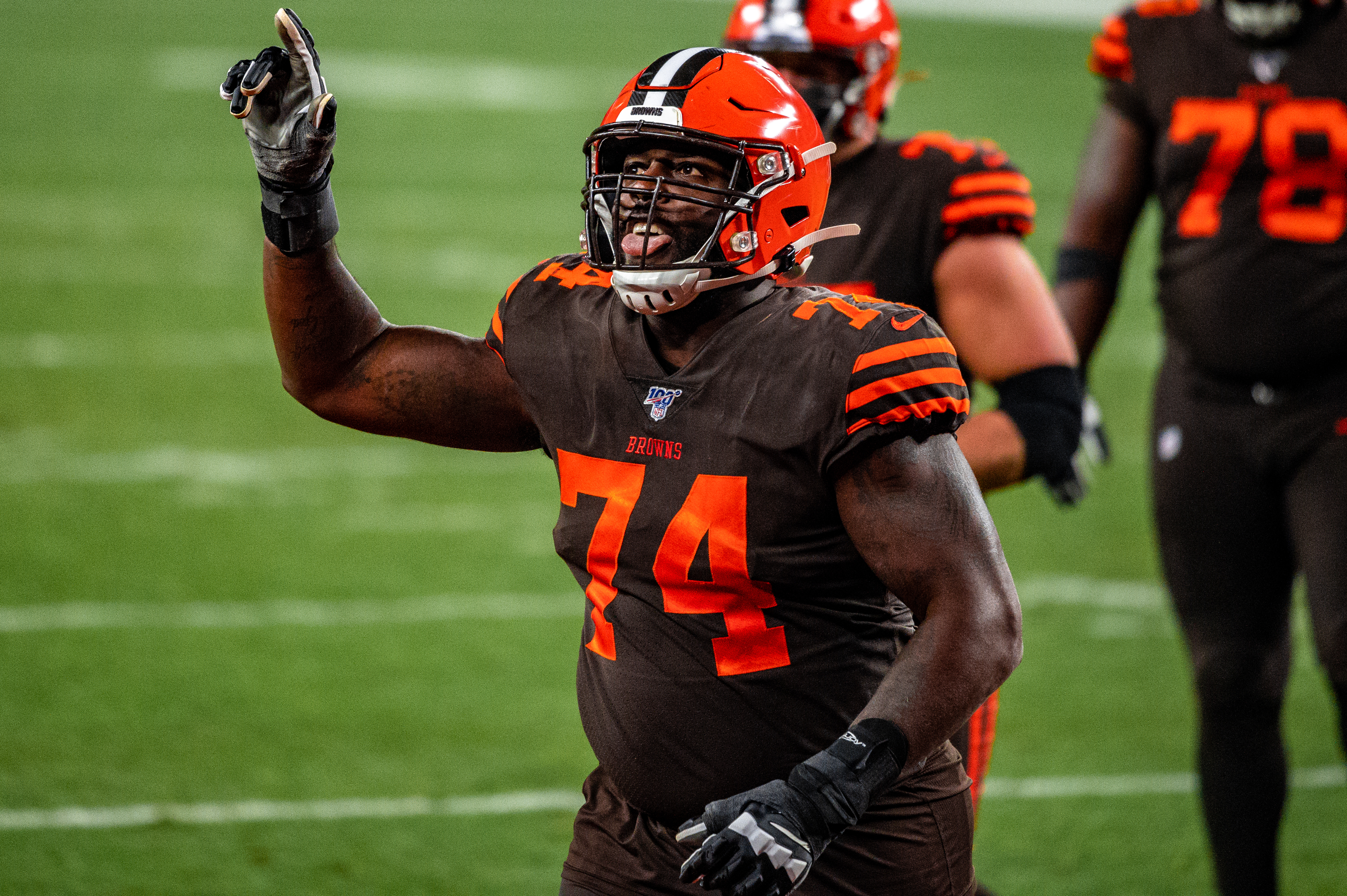
Hubbard with the Cleveland Browns in 2019

On March 15, 2018, the Cleveland Browns signed Hubbard to a five-year, $37.50 million contract that includes $15.15 million guaranteed and a signing bonus of $4 million. He was named the Browns starting right tackle, and started all 16 games.

Hubbard retained his starting role as the starting right tackle in 2019 but was demoted to a backup offensive tackle and guard after the Cleveland Browns signed free agent Jack Conklin to replace Hubbard at right tackle and also drafted Jedrick Wills in the first round (10th overall) of the 2020 NFL draft. Hubbard agreed to restructure his contract in order to remain with the team. Hubbard was placed on the reserve/COVID-19 list by the team on November 13, 2020, and activated on November 26. Hubbard was placed on injured reserve on December 22, 2020, as a result of a knee injury he sustained during the Browns' Week 15 matchup.

On October 12, 2021, Hubbard was placed on injured reserve.

On March 16, 2022, Hubbard re-signed with the Browns on a one-year contract.

=== Tennessee Titans ===
On July 28, 2023, Hubbard signed with the Tennessee Titans. He was named the starting right tackle, starting nine games before being placed on injured reserve on November 25, 2023, with a biceps injury.

=== San Francisco 49ers ===
On May 14, 2024, Hubbard signed with the San Francisco 49ers. He was released on August 27. On September 11, 2024, Hubbard was signed to the 49ers' practice squad.

=== New York Giants ===
On October 18, 2024, Hubbard was signed by the New York Giants off the 49ers practice squad.

=== Detroit Lions ===
On November 5, 2025, Hubbard signed with the Detroit Lions' practice squad. He started Week 18, and played every offensive snap.
