= Janet Porter =

American anti-abortion activist and author (born 1961)

Janet Folger Porter
- Born: Janet L. Folger; October 13, 1962 (age 63)
- Occupation: Radio personality
- Known for: Anti-abortion activist Supporting six-week abortion bans
- Spouse: David Porter (m. 2008)

Janet L. Folger Porter (born October 13, 1962) is an American anti-abortion activist and author.

== Biography ==
Porter founded the conservative Christian ministry Faith2Action in 2003 and the Facebook-like social website ReaganBook (defunct by August 2014). She is most known for promoting the anti-abortion movement and anti-LGBT activism. In 2018, the Southern Poverty Law Center designated Faith2Action as a hate group for its anti-LGBT stance.

Porter believes homosexuality is a choice. She has stated that gay marriage caused Noah's floods, and was significant in developing a 1990s gay conversion campaign. The Guardian wrote, "The 1998 campaign claimed "former homosexuals" could convert to heterosexuality after attending 'ex-gay ministries.' Porter called it Truth in Love.' Recognizing the harm such programs can cause, gay conversion therapy was made illegal in many states, including parts of Florida and Ohio."

In 2017, she served as a spokesperson for Roy Moore in his campaign for the United States Senate special election in Alabama, 2017, drawing media attention for repeatedly refusing to answer direct questions about the candidate's publicly stated beliefs.

From 1997 to 2002, she was the national director of the Center for Reclaiming America and an Ohio Right to Life legislative director. Porter has also worked on campaigns supporting George W. Bush for president and Mike Huckabee for president.

== Anti-abortion activism ==
Porter's efforts supporting the passing of six-week abortion bans (called "heartbeat bills" by their proponents) in American state legislatures have led to her being described as "in many ways the godmother of the heartbeat movement."

Prior to founding Faith2Action in 2003, she was the legislative director for Ohio Right to Life, from 1988 to 1997. There, she helped lobby for the first partial-birth abortion ban in the United States, which was later upheld by the Supreme Court in Gonzales v. Carhart.

She then served as the national director of the Center for Reclaiming America from September 1997 to 2002. She has said that she joined the center because she wanted to focus on more issues than just abortion. There, she led a campaign promoting the idea that homosexuality is an individual choice.

The original Ohio "Heartbeat Bill" (House Bill 493) was authored by Porter, who introduced its first version in Ohio in 2011, and advocated for its passage; former Governor John Kasich vetoed it twice, prior to it passing in 2019. In 2011, she played "testimony" from a fetus in legislative hearings on the bill, by projecting an ultrasound image onto a screen and showing it to legislators.

Passed by legislatures in four states, and introduced in 11 more, Porter's bill was supported by conservatives seeking to mount a challenge to Roe v. Wade.

== Faith2Action radio show ==
Porter previously hosted a radio show, also called Faith2Action, before it was cancelled in 2010. VCY America, the show's parent company, said it cancelled the show because Porter had expressed views too similar to dominion theology. The following week, she posted a blog post denying that she supported dominion theology.

== Political candidacy ==
In 2016, Porter ran unsuccessfully against Larry Obhof in the Republican primary for the Ohio Senate's 22nd district. During her candidacy, she criticized Republican opponents for not supporting six-week abortion bans. Her campaign was supported by Mike Huckabee. In a February 2016 video, Huckabee announced that he was supporting Porter because she would fight "for faith, family, and freedom."

In 2022, Porter ran for the Republican nomination in Ohio's 13th congressional district, ultimately finishing third in the May 3 primary, behind winner Madison Gesiotto and runner-up Gregory Wheeler.

== Website to decertify 2020 presidential election ==
Porter is one of the principals behind a website that encourages citizens to send postcards to five key states to "decertify fraud" in the 2020 presidential election, and charges up to $100 to do so. Those five states—Arizona, Georgia, Pennsylvania, Wisconsin, and Michigan, were won by Joe Biden in the election. There is no legal process to do such decertification, and the non-partisan fact-checking website PolitiFact rated the claims to the contrary "Pants on Fire." A Facebook post by Porter promoting the website was flagged as part of Facebook's efforts to combat false news and misinformation on its News Feed.

== Author ==
Porter is the author of several books published by Random House, including True to Life and The Criminalization of Christianity.

She has authored a column for WorldNetDaily since 2007, in which she has promoted conspiracy theories about Barack Obama, including that he is not a U.S. citizen.
