= Madison Gesiotto Gilbert =

American attorney and political candidate

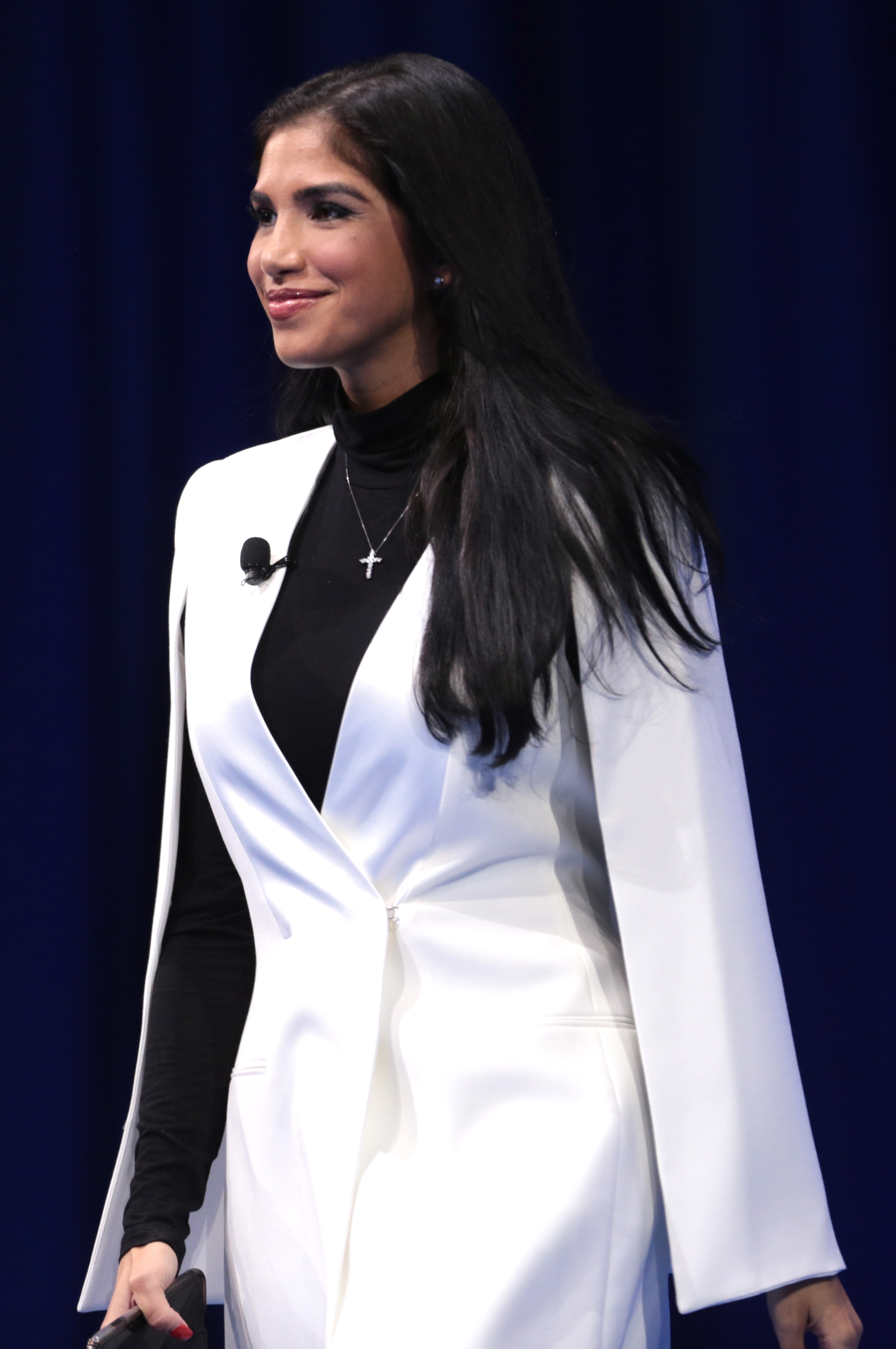
- Gesiotto in 2017
- Born: Madison Mari Gesiotto; March 20, 1992 (age 34); Pittsburgh, Pennsylvania, U.S.
- Education: The Ohio State University (BA, JD)
- Known for: Miss Ohio USA (2014)
- Political party: Republican
- Spouse: Marcus Gilbert (m. 2021)

Madison Mari Gesiotto Gilbert (née Gesiotto; born March 20, 1992) is an American attorney, pageant queen, political candidate, and political executive. Gesiotto Gilbert was the national and international representative as Miss Ohio USA in 2014 and represented Ohio at that year's Miss USA. She was previously the author of a weekly column at The Washington Times titled "Millennial Mindset". Since 2023, she has been serving as the National Spokesperson of the Republican National Committee.

Gesiotto Gilbert was the Republican nominee in the 2022 election in Ohio's 13th congressional district, losing to Democrat Emilia Sykes.

== Early life and education ==
Gesiotto Gilbert attended Jackson Local Schools in Massillon, Ohio, and trained as a competitive figure skater in Lakewood, Ohio, at the Winterhurst Figure Skating Club. Gesiotto was coached by Carol Heiss.

In 2010, Gesiotto Gilbert passed her gold tests in free skating and moves-in-the-field.

Gesiotto Gilbert graduated with honors from Ohio State University in 2014 with a Bachelor of Arts in political science. She graduated from Moritz College of Law at Ohio State in 2017 with a Juris Doctor degree.

== Pageants ==
Gesiotto Gilbert represented Columbus at the Miss Ohio USA pageant in 2013, where she placed third runner-up to Kristin Smith. She praised pageant competition for the networking opportunities it provided.

Gesiotto represented Mid Ohio at the Miss Ohio USA pageant in 2014, where she was crowned Miss Ohio USA.

After winning Miss Ohio USA, Gesiotto Gilbert was featured on various television news outlets for her promotion of political awareness and her fundraising for Wounded Warrior Project.

She was also featured in a New York Times article profiling pageant consultant Bill Alverson.

Gesiotto Gilbert competed in the Miss USA 2014 competition on June 8, 2014, representing the state of Ohio.

== Career ==
Gesiotto Gilbert was the author of a weekly column at The Washington Times, entitled "Millennial Mindset", that focused on various American political, policy, and legal issues. She previously anchored daily news briefings for The Washington Times.

Gesiotto Gilbert worked for Mitt Romney's 2012 presidential campaign and on the United States Senate Committee on Small Business and Entrepreneurship. As a law student at Moritz College of Law, Gesiotto Gilbert was a staff editor for The Ohio State Journal of Criminal Law.

In September 2016, Gesiotto Gilbert endorsed Donald Trump in her Washington Times column. Gesiotto Gilbert described two instances in which she personally interacted with Trump, and described the reasons why she supported him for president. On December 14, 2020, Gesiotto Gilbert represented Ohio as a voter in the electoral college.

== U.S. House campaigns ==
Gesiotto Gilbert announced she was running for the United States House of Representatives in Ohio's 13th congressional district.

In November 2022, she lost the general election to Democratic nominee Emilia Sykes, an Ohio state representative.

In February 2023, Gesiotto Gilbert announced that she was seeking a rematch for the same district in the 2024 elections. In August 2023, she announced that she was dropping out of the race to take the job of national spokesperson at the RNC.

== Personal life ==
On February 22, 2021, Gesiotto married former NFL offensive tackle Marcus Gilbert.

Gesiotto is a Roman Catholic.

Awards and achievements
Preceded by Kristin Smith	Miss Ohio USA; 2014	Succeeded by Sarah Newkirk
