= 2010 Ohio State Treasurer election =

- November 2, 2010
- Registered: 8,037,806
- Turnout: 49.22%
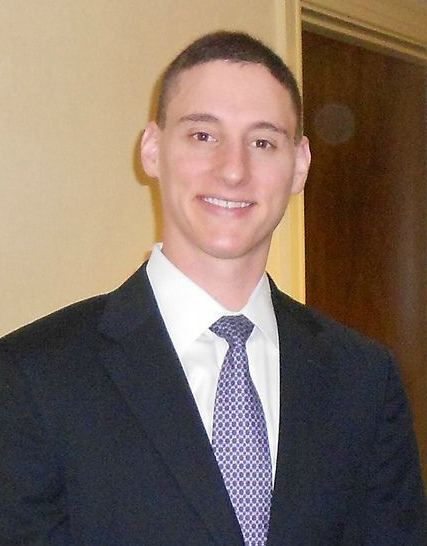

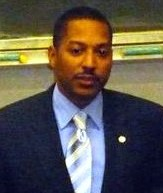
Candidate	Josh Mandel	Kevin Boyce
Party	Republican	Democratic
Popular vote	2,050,142	1,525,992
Percentage	54.52%	40.58%
- County results Mandel: 40-50% 50-60% 60-70% 70-80% Boyce: 40-50% 50–60% 60–70%
State Auditor before election
Kevin Boyce
Democratic
Elected State Auditor
Josh Mandel
Republican

The 2010 Ohio State Treasurer election was held on November 2, 2010, to elect the Ohio State Treasurer, concurrently with elections to the United States Senate, U.S. House of Representatives, governor, and other state and local elections. Primary elections were held on May 4, 2010.

Incumbent Democratic treasurer Richard Cordray resigned as state treasurer following his election as the Ohio Attorney General in a 2008 special election. Governor Ted Strickland appointed Columbus City Council member Kevin Boyce to serve as state treasurer.

Republican state representative Josh Mandel defeated Boyce in the general election. Mandel led in fundraising throughout much of the campaign.

== Democratic primary ==
=== Candidates ===
==== Nominee ====
- Kevin Boyce, incumbent state treasurer (2009–present) and former member of the Columbus City Council (2000–2009)

=== Results ===
Democratic primary results
Party	Candidate	Votes	%
Democratic	Kevin Boyce (incumbent)	518,138	100.0
Total votes		518,138	100.0

== Republican primary ==
=== Candidates ===
==== Nominee ====
- Josh Mandel, state representative from the 17th district (2007–present) and former Lyndhurst city councilman

=== Results ===
Republican primary results
Party	Candidate	Votes	%
Republican	Josh Mandel	644,207	100.0
Total votes		644,207	100.0

== Libertarian primary ==
=== Candidates ===
==== Nominee ====
- Matthew Cantrell, financial professional

=== Results ===
Libertarian primary results
Party	Candidate	Votes	%
Libertarian	Matthew Cantrell	4,276	100.0
Total votes		4,276	100.0

== General election ==
=== Results ===
2010 Ohio State Treasurer election
Party	Candidate	Votes	%
Republican	Josh Mandel	2,050,142	54.52%
Democratic	Kevin Boyce (incumbent)	1,525,992	40.58%
Libertarian	Matthew Cantrell	184,478	4.90%
Total votes		3,760,612	100.0%
Republican gain from Democratic			
