= 2010 United States House of Representatives elections in Ohio =

- November 2, 2010

All 18 Ohio seats to the United States House of Representatives
	Majority party	Minority party
Party	Republican	Democratic
Last election	8	10
Seats won	13	5
Seat change	▲5	▼5
Popular vote	2,053,075	1,611,112
Percentage	53.67%	42.12%
Swing	▲7.31%	▼9.09%

Republican
40–50%
50–60%
60–70%
70–80%
Democratic
40–50%
50–60%
60–70%
80–90%

The 2010 congressional elections in Ohio were held on November 2, 2010. Ohio had eighteen seats in the United States House of Representatives, and all eighteen incumbent Representatives were seeking re-election in 2010. The elections were held on the same day as many other Ohio elections, and the same day as House of Representatives elections in other states.

== Overview ==
United States House of Representatives elections in Ohio, 2010
Party	Votes	Percentage	Seats before	Seats after	+/–
Republican	2,053,075	53.67%	8	13	+5
Democratic	1,611,112	42.12%	10	5	-5
Libertarian	101,549	2.65%	0	0	-
Constitution	26,722	0.70%	0	0	-
Green	2,000	0.01%	0	0	-
Independent	30,816	0.81%	0	0	-
Totals	3,825,274	100%	18	18	—

=== By district ===
Results of the 2010 United States House of Representatives elections in Ohio by district:

District	Republican		Democratic		Others		Total		Result
District	Votes	%	Votes	%	Votes	%	Votes	%	Result
District 1	103,770	51.49%	92,672	45.99%	5,076	2.52%	201,518	100.00%	Republican gain
District 2	139,027	58.45%	82,431	34.66%	16,387	6.89%	237,845	100.00%	Republican hold
District 3	152,629	68.11%	71,455	31.89%	0	0.00%	224,084	100.00%	Republican hold
District 4	146,029	71.49%	50,533	24.74%	7,708	3.77%	204,270	100.00%	Republican hold
District 5	140,703	67.83%	54,919	26.47%	11,831	5.70%	207,453	100.00%	Republican hold
District 6	103,170	50.19%	92,823	45.15%	9,582	4.66%	205,575	100.00%	Republican gain
District 7	135,721	62.17%	70,400	32.25%	12,192	5.58%	218,313	100.00%	Republican hold
District 8	142,731	65.64%	65,883	30.30%	8,822	4.06%	217,436	100.00%	Republican hold
District 9	83,423	40.65%	121,819	59.35%	0	0.00%	205,242	100.00%	Democratic hold
District 10	83,809	43.87%	101,343	53.05%	5,874	3.08%	191,026	100.00%	Democratic hold
District 11	28,754	17.07%	139,693	82.93%	0	0.00%	168,447	100.00%	Democratic hold
District 12	150,163	55.78%	110,307	40.98%	8,710	3.24%	269,180	100.00%	Republican hold
District 13	94,367	44.27%	118,806	55.73%	0	0.00%	213,173	100.00%	Democratic hold
District 14	149,878	64.92%	72,604	31.45%	8,383	3.63%	230,865	100.00%	Republican hold
District 15	119,471	54.16%	91,077	41.29%	10,048	4.55%	220,596	100.00%	Republican gain
District 16	114,652	52.08%	90,833	41.26%	14,652	6.66%	220,137	100.00%	Republican gain
District 17	57,352	30.08%	102,758	53.89%	30,556	16.03%	190,666	100.00%	Democratic hold
District 18	107,426	53.86%	80,756	40.49%	11,266	5.65%	199,448	100.00%	Republican gain
Total	2,053,075	53.67%	1,611,112	42.12%	161,087	4.21%	3,825,274	100.00%	

== District 1 ==
2010 Ohio's 1st congressional district election
- November 2, 2010
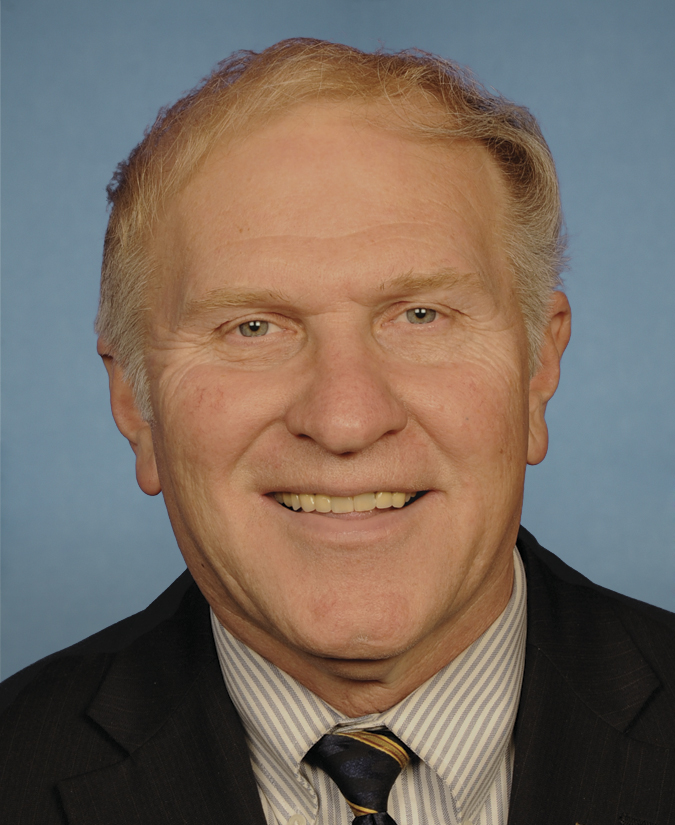

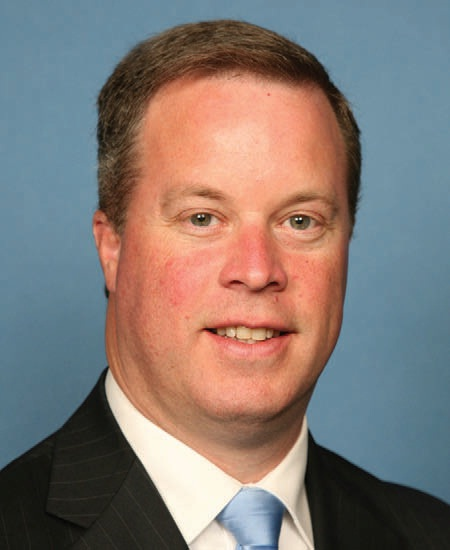
Nominee	Steve Chabot	Steve Driehaus
Party	Republican	Democratic
Popular vote	103,770	92,672
Percentage	51.5%	46.0%
- County results Chabot: 50–60% 70–80%
U.S. Representative before election
Steve Driehaus
Democratic
Elected U.S. Representative
Steve Chabot
Republican

Democratic incumbent Steve Driehaus represented the district since 2009. He faced Republican nominee and former U.S. Congressman Steve Chabot, along with Libertarian nominee James Berns (PVS) and Green Party nominee Richard Stevenson (campaign site, PVS). In 2008, Obama carried the district with 55% of the vote. Driehaus was defeated in 2010.

- Race ranking and details from CQ Politics
- Campaign contributions from OpenSecrets
- Race profile at The New York Times
- OH - District 1 from OurCampaigns.com

=== Polling ===
Poll source	Date(s) administered	Sample size	Margin of error	Steve Driehaus (D)	Steve Chabot (R)	Other
American Action Forum	August 16–21, 2010	400	± 4.90%	45%	47%	8%
The Polling Company	July 30-August 2, 2010	301	± 5.65%	41%	51%	7%

=== Predictions ===
Source	Ranking	As of
The Cook Political Report	Lean R (flip)	November 1, 2010
Rothenberg	Likely R (flip)	November 1, 2010
Sabato's Crystal Ball	Lean R (flip)	November 1, 2010
RCP	Lean R (flip)	November 1, 2010
CQ Politics	Likely R (flip)	October 28, 2010
New York Times	Lean R (flip)	November 1, 2010
FiveThirtyEight	Likely R (flip)	November 1, 2010

=== Results ===
Ohio's 1st Congressional District House election, 2010
Party	Candidate	Votes	%
Republican	Steve Chabot	103,770	51.5%
Democratic	Steven Driehaus (incumbent)	92,672	46.0%
Libertarian	Jim A. Berns	3,076	1.5%
Green	Richard L. Stevenson	2,000	1.0%
Total votes		201,518	100%
Republican gain from Democratic			

== District 2 ==
2010 Ohio's 2nd congressional district election
- November 2, 2010
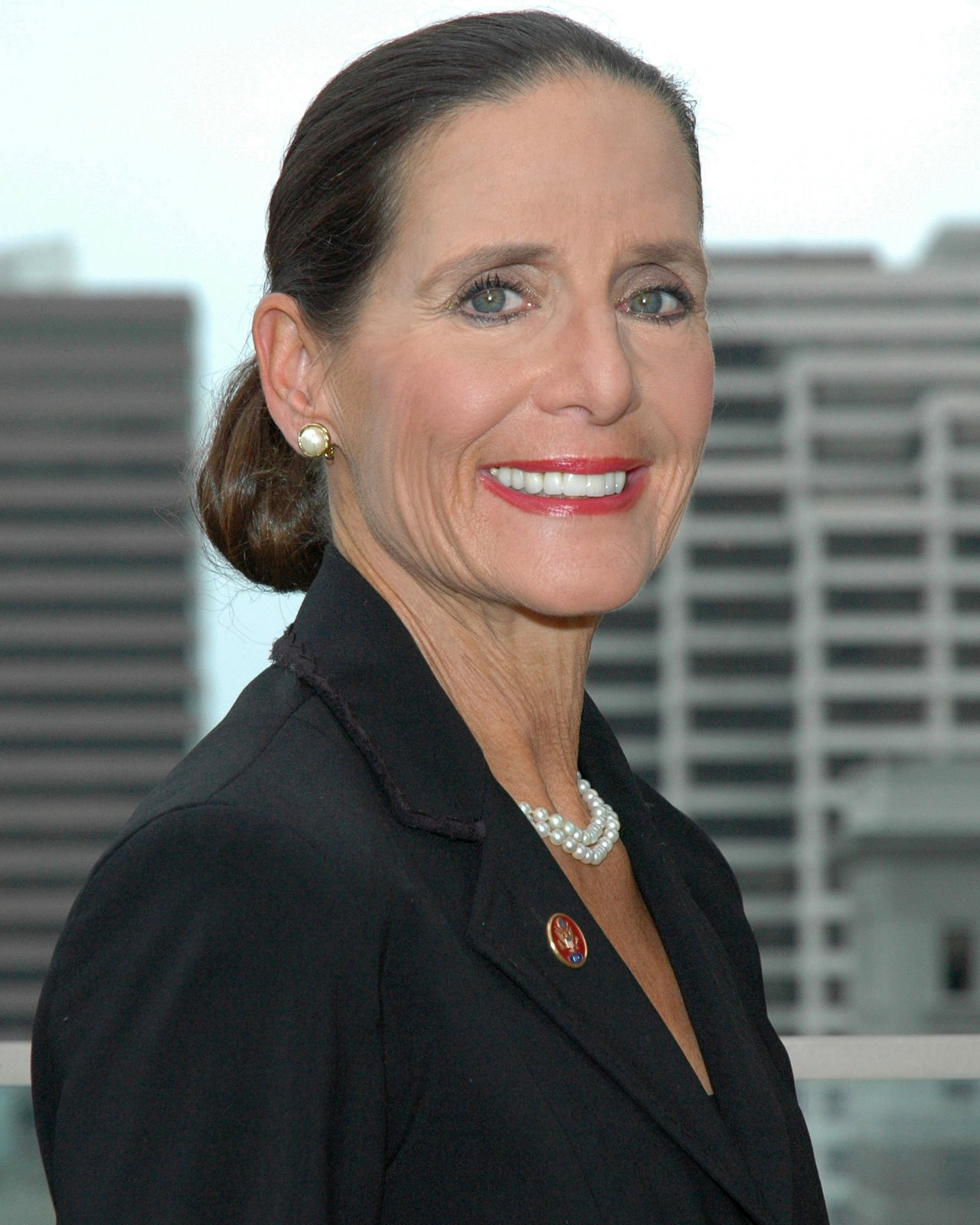

Nominee	Jean Schmidt	Surya Yalamanchili
Party	Republican	Democratic
Popular vote	139,027	82,431
Percentage	58.5%	34.7%
- County results Schmidt: 50–60% 60–70%
U.S. Representative before election
Jean Schmidt
Republican
Elected U.S. Representative
Jean Schmidt
Republican

Republican incumbent Jean Schmidt had represented this district since 2005. She faced Democratic nominee Surya Yalamanchili, a marketing executive (PVS), and Libertarian nominee Marc Johnston (PVS). In 2008, McCain carried this district with 59% of the vote.

- Race ranking and details from CQ Politics
- Campaign contributions from OpenSecrets
- Race profile at The New York Times
- OH - District 2 from OurCampaigns.com

2010 Republican primary results by county Schmidt 40–50% Schmidt 50–60% Schmidt 60–70% Schmidt 70–80%

=== Predictions ===
Source	Ranking	As of
The Cook Political Report	Safe R	November 1, 2010
Rothenberg	Safe R	November 1, 2010
Sabato's Crystal Ball	Safe R	November 1, 2010
RCP	Safe R	November 1, 2010
CQ Politics	Safe R	October 28, 2010
New York Times	Safe R	November 1, 2010
FiveThirtyEight	Safe R	November 1, 2010

=== Results ===
Ohio's 2nd Congressional District House election, 2010
Party	Candidate	Votes	%
Republican	Jean Schmidt (incumbent)	139,027	58.45%
Democratic	Surya Yalamanchili	82,431	34.66%
Libertarian	Marc Johnston	16,259	6.84%
Independent	Randy Conover	128	0.05%
Total votes		237,845	100%
Republican hold			

== District 3 ==
2010 Ohio's 3rd congressional district election
- November 2, 2010
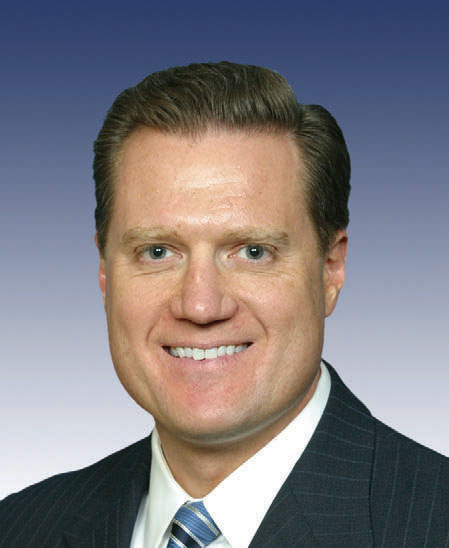

Nominee	Mike Turner	Joe Roberts
Party	Republican	Democratic
Popular vote	152,629	71,455
Percentage	68.1%	31.9%
- County results Turner: 60–70% 70–80%
U.S. Representative before election
Mike Turner
Republican
Elected U.S. Representative
Mike Turner
Republican

Republican incumbent Mike Turner had represented this district since 2003. He was challenged by Democratic nominee Joe Roberts (PVS) in the general election. In 2008, McCain carried this district with 51% of the vote.

- Race ranking and details from CQ Politics
- Campaign contributions from OpenSecrets
- Race profile at The New York Times
- OH - District 3 from OurCampaigns.com

=== Predictions ===
Source	Ranking	As of
The Cook Political Report	Safe R	November 1, 2010
Rothenberg	Safe R	November 1, 2010
Sabato's Crystal Ball	Safe R	November 1, 2010
RCP	Safe R	November 1, 2010
CQ Politics	Safe R	October 28, 2010
New York Times	Safe R	November 1, 2010
FiveThirtyEight	Safe R	November 1, 2010

=== Results ===
Ohio's 3rd Congressional District House election, 2010
Party	Candidate	Votes	%
Republican	Mike Turner (incumbent)	152,629	68.11%
Democratic	Joe Roberts	71,455	31.89%
Total votes		224,084	100%
Republican hold			

== District 4 ==
2010 Ohio's 4th congressional district election
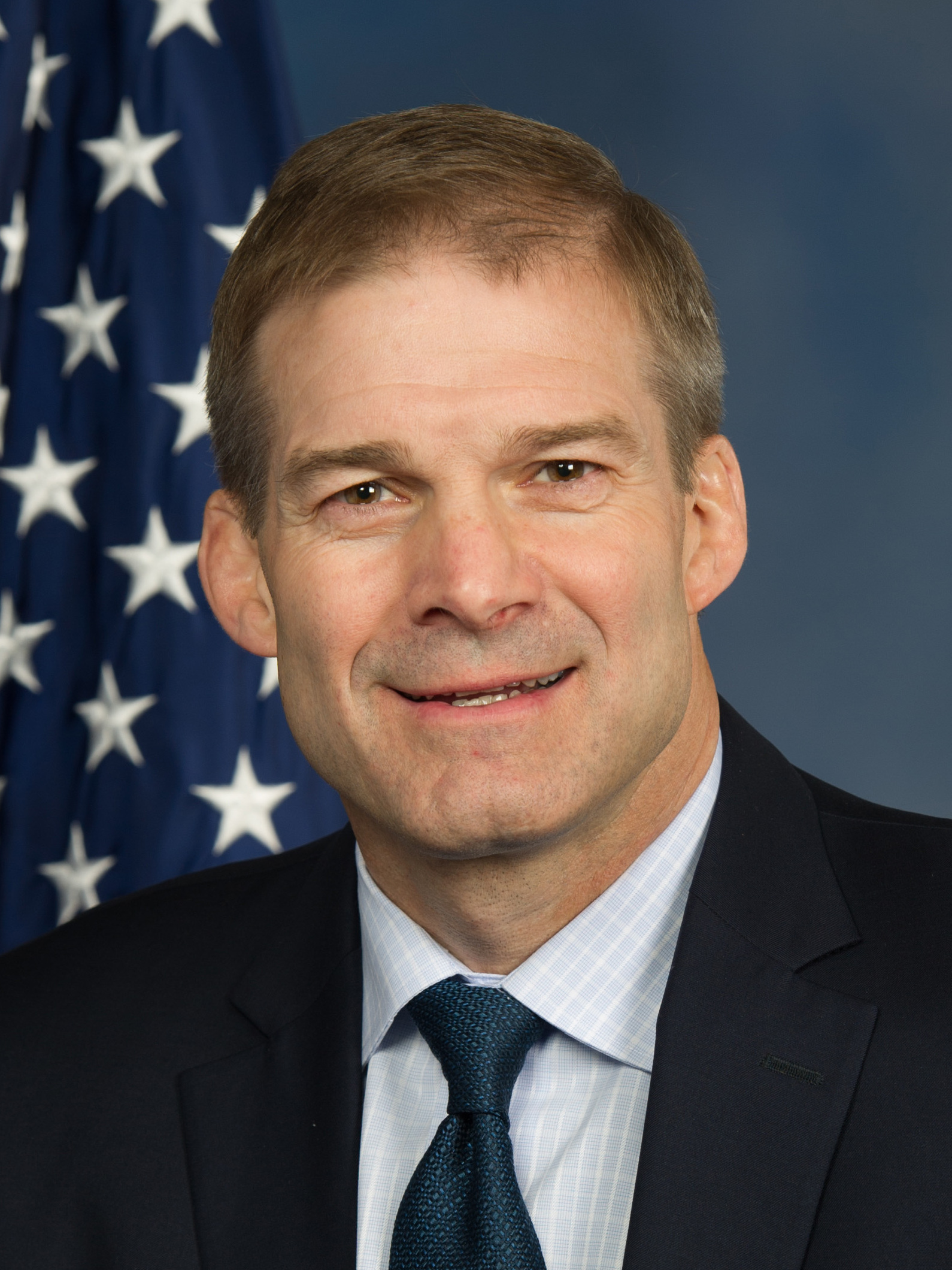

Nominee	Jim Jordan	Doug Litt
Party	Republican	Democratic
Popular vote	146,029	50,553
Percentage	71.5%	24.7%
- County results Jordan: 60–70% 70–80%
U.S. Representative before election
Jim Jordan
Republican
Elected U.S. Representative
Jim Jordan
Republican

Republican incumbent Jim Jordan had represented this district since 2007. He faced Democrat Doug Litt (PVS) and Libertarian Donald Kissick (campaign site, PVS), in the general election. In 2008, McCain carried this district with 60% of the vote.

- Race ranking and details from CQ Politics
- Campaign contributions from OpenSecrets
- Race profile at The New York Times
- OH - District 4 from OurCampaigns.com

FEC, as of June 30, 2010:

Candidate (party)	Receipts	Disbursements	Cash on hand	Debt
Jim Jordan (R)	$580,530	$361,192	$793,203	$0
Doug Litt (D)	$5,885	$2,203	$3,675	$0
Donald Kissick (L)	Unreported			

=== Predictions ===
Source	Ranking	As of
The Cook Political Report	Safe R	November 1, 2010
Rothenberg	Safe R	November 1, 2010
Sabato's Crystal Ball	Safe R	November 1, 2010
RCP	Safe R	November 1, 2010
CQ Politics	Safe R	October 28, 2010
New York Times	Safe R	November 1, 2010
FiveThirtyEight	Safe R	November 1, 2010

=== Results ===
Ohio's 4th Congressional District House election, 2010
Party	Candidate	Votes	%
Republican	Jim Jordan (incumbent)	146,029	71.49%
Democratic	Doug Litt	50,553	24.74%
Libertarian	Donald Kissick	7,708	3.77%
Total votes		204,270	100%
Republican hold			

== District 5 ==
2010 Ohio's 5th congressional district election
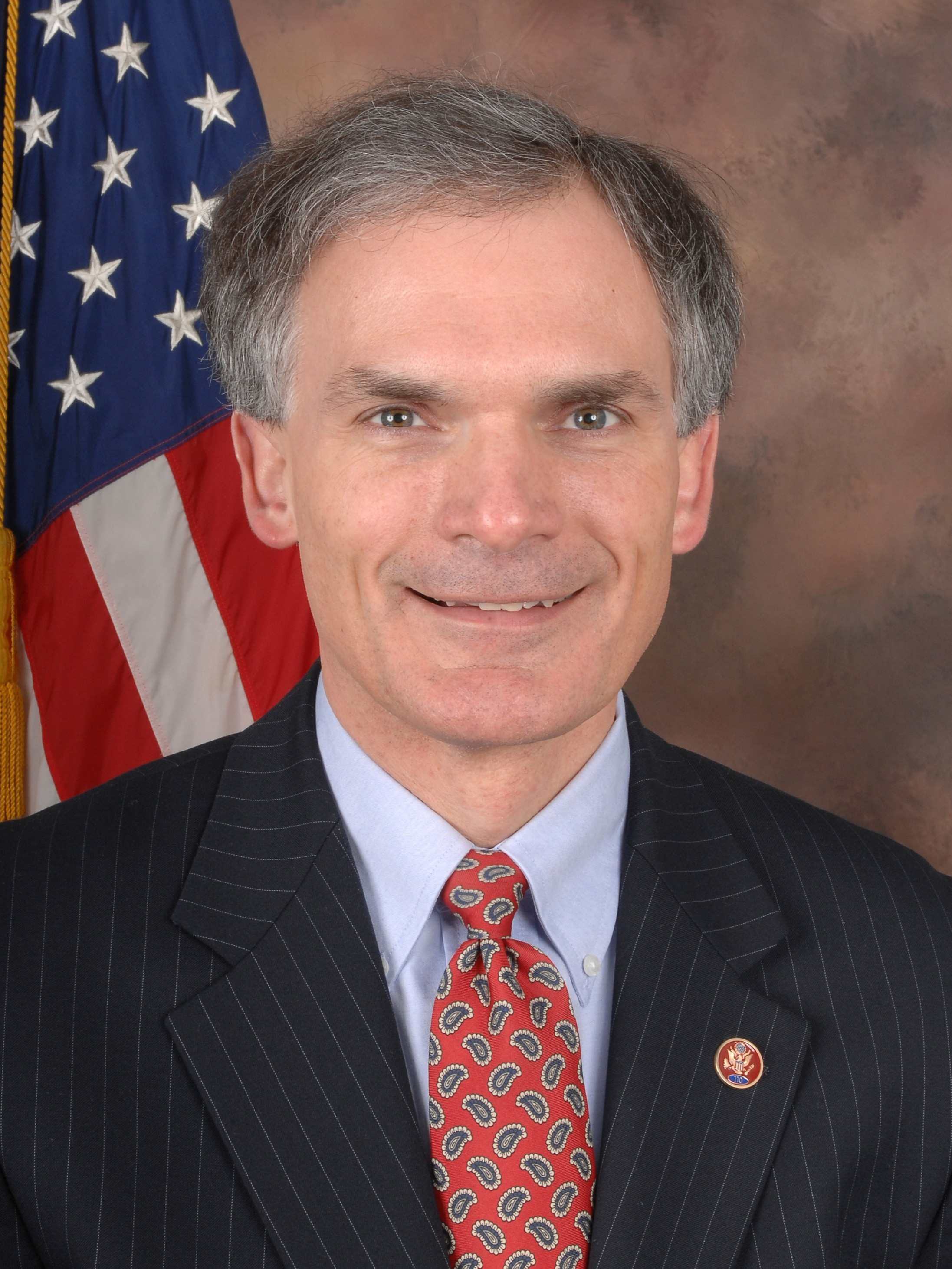

Nominee	Bob Latta	Caleb Finkenbiner
Party	Republican	Democratic
Popular vote	140,703	54,919
Percentage	67.8%	26.5%
U.S. Representative before election
Bob Latta
Republican
Elected U.S. Representative
Bob Latta
Republican

Republican incumbent Bob Latta had represented this district since 2007. He faced Democratic nominee Caleb Finkenbiner (PVS) and Libertarian nominee Brian L. Smith (PVS) in the general election. In 2008, McCain carried this district with 53% of the vote.

- Race ranking and details from CQ Politics
- Campaign contributions from OpenSecrets
- Race profile at The New York Times
- OH - District 5 from OurCampaigns.com

=== Predictions ===
Source	Ranking	As of
The Cook Political Report	Safe R	November 1, 2010
Rothenberg	Safe R	November 1, 2010
Sabato's Crystal Ball	Safe R	November 1, 2010
RCP	Safe R	November 1, 2010
CQ Politics	Safe R	October 28, 2010
New York Times	Safe R	November 1, 2010
FiveThirtyEight	Safe R	November 1, 2010

=== Results ===
Ohio's 5th Congressional District House election, 2010
Party	Candidate	Votes	%
Republican	Bob Latta (incumbent)	140,703	67.82%
Democratic	Caleb Finkenbiner	54,919	26.47%
Libertarian	Brian Smith	11,831	5.70%
Total votes		207,453	100%
Republican hold			

== District 6 ==
2010 Ohio's 6th congressional district election
- November 2, 2010
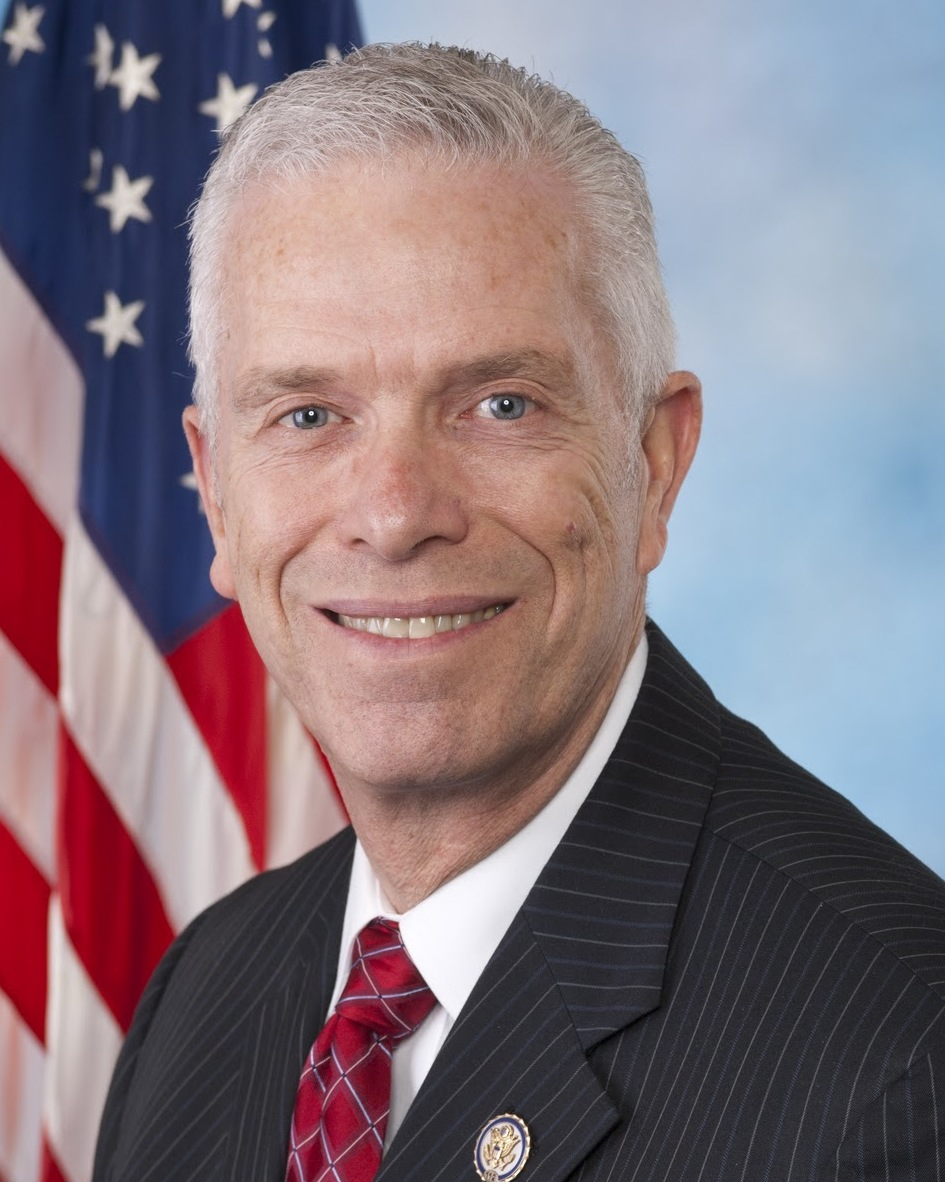

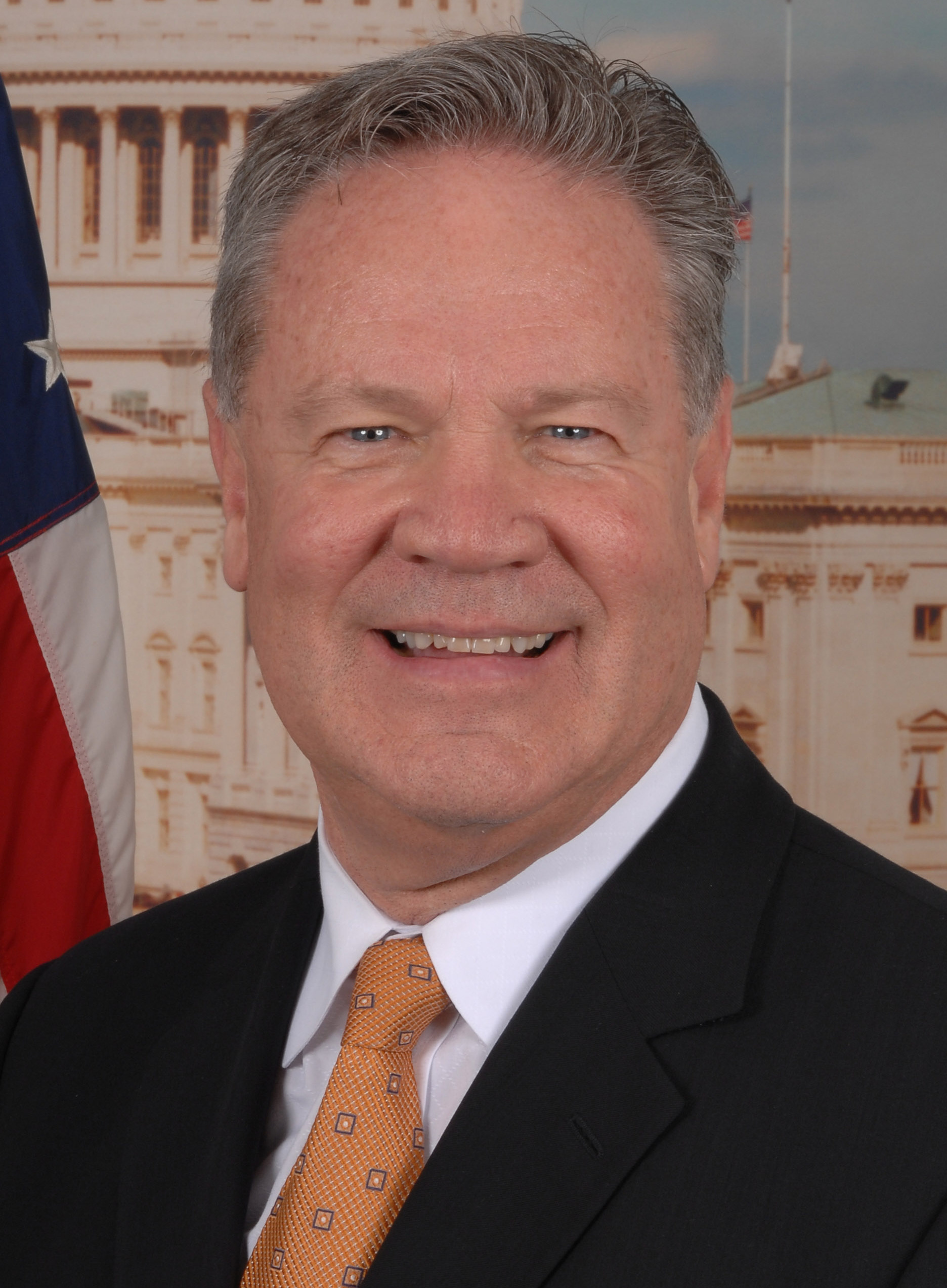
Nominee	Bill Johnson	Charlie Wilson
Party	Republican	Democratic
Popular vote	103,170	92,823
Percentage	50.19%	45.15%
- Johnson: 40–50% 50–60% 60–70% Wilson: 40–50% 50–60% 60–70%
U.S. Representative before election
Charlie Wilson
Democratic
Elected U.S. Representative
Bill Johnson
Republican

Democratic incumbent Charlie Wilson represented this district since 2007. He faced Republican nominee Bill Johnson, Libertarian nominee Martin J. "Buck" Elsass (campaign site, PVS), and Constitution Party nominee Richard E. Cadle (PVS) in the general election. In 2008, McCain carried this district with 50% of the vote. Wilson was defeated in 2010.

- Race ranking and details from CQ Politics
- Campaign contributions from OpenSecrets
- Race profile at The New York Times
- OH - District 6 from OurCampaigns.com

=== Predictions ===
Source	Ranking	As of
The Cook Political Report	Tossup	November 1, 2010
Rothenberg	Tossup	November 1, 2010
Sabato's Crystal Ball	Lean D	November 1, 2010
RCP	Tossup	November 1, 2010
CQ Politics	Tossup	October 28, 2010
New York Times	Tossup	November 1, 2010
FiveThirtyEight	Lean D	November 1, 2010

=== Results ===
Ohio's 6th Congressional District House election, 2010
Party	Candidate	Votes	%
Republican	Bill Johnson	103,170	50.19%
Democratic	Charlie Wilson (incumbent)	92,823	45.15%
Constitution	Richard Cadle	5,077	2.47%
Libertarian	Martin Elsass	4,505	2.19%
Total votes		205,575	100%
Republican gain from Democratic			

== District 7 ==
2010 Ohio's 7th congressional district election
- November 2, 2010
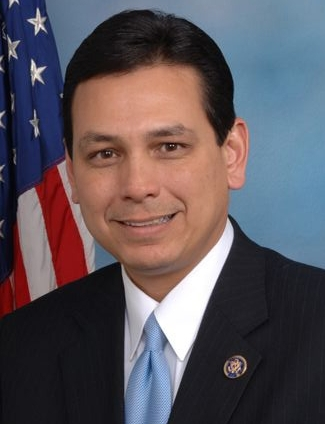

Nominee	Steve Austria	Bill Conner
Party	Republican	Democratic
Popular vote	135,721	70,400
Percentage	62.17%	32.25%
- County results Austria: 50–60% 60–70% 70–80% Conner: 50–60%
U.S. Representative before election
Steve Austria
Republican
Elected U.S. Representative
Steve Austria
Republican

Republican incumbent Steve Austria had represented the district since 2009. He faced Democrat Bill Conner (campaign site, PVS), Libertarian John D. Anderson (campaign site, PVS), and Constitution Party David Easton (PVS) in the general election. In 2008, McCain carried the district with 54% of the vote.

- Race ranking and details from CQ Politics
- Campaign contributions from OpenSecrets
- Race profile at The New York Times
- OH - District 7 from OurCampaigns.com

=== Predictions ===
Source	Ranking	As of
The Cook Political Report	Safe R	November 1, 2010
Rothenberg	Safe R	November 1, 2010
Sabato's Crystal Ball	Safe R	November 1, 2010
RCP	Safe R	November 1, 2010
CQ Politics	Safe R	October 28, 2010
New York Times	Safe R	November 1, 2010
FiveThirtyEight	Safe R	November 1, 2010

=== Results ===
Ohio's 7th Congressional District House election, 2010
Party	Candidate	Votes	%
Republican	Steve Austria (incumbent)	135,721	62.17%
Democratic	Bill Conner	70,400	32.25%
Libertarian	John Anderson	9,381	4.30%
Constitution	David Easton	2,811	1.29%
Total votes		218,313	100%
Republican hold			

== District 8 ==
2010 Ohio's 8th congressional district election
- November 2, 2010
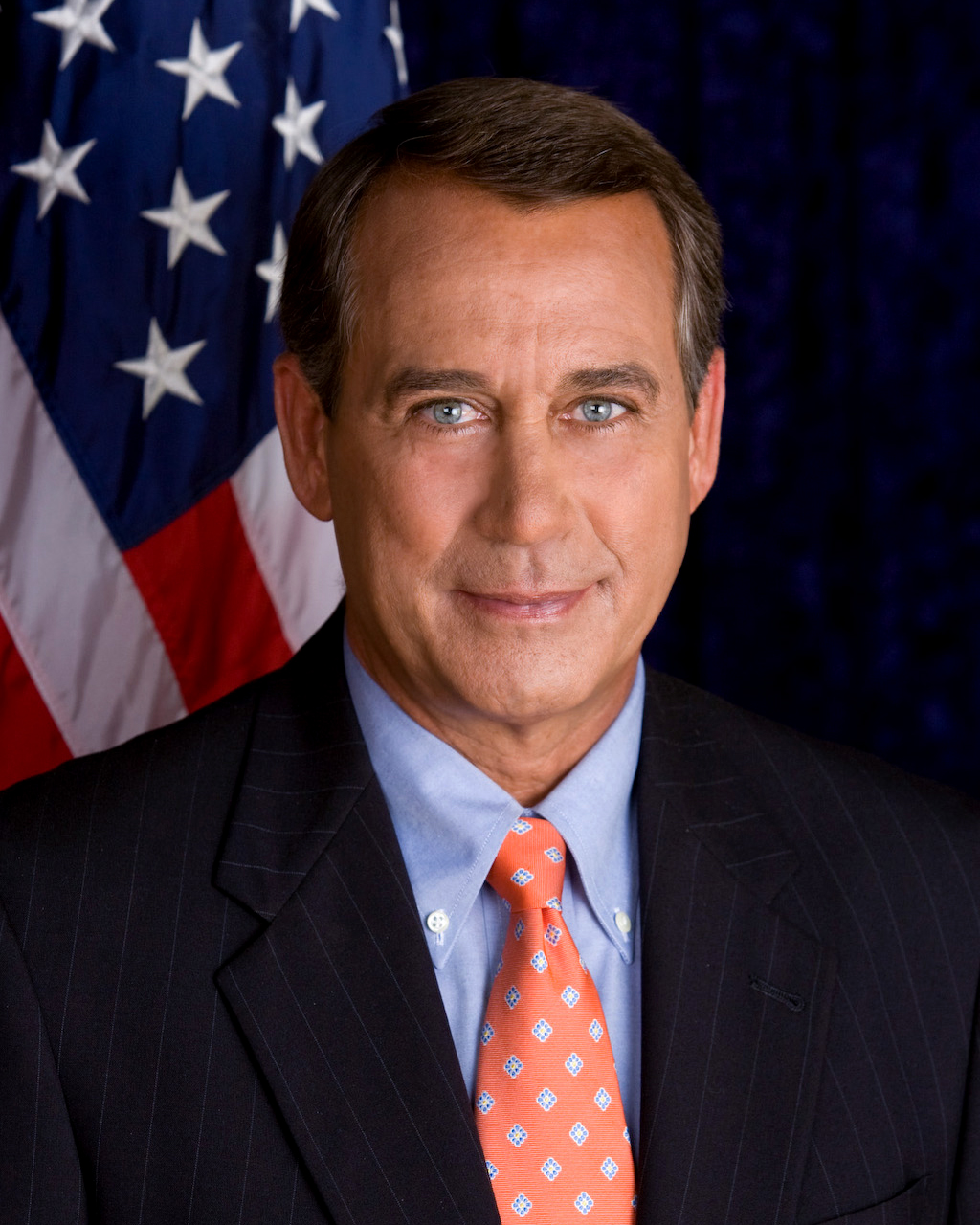

Nominee	John Boehner	Justin Coussoule
Party	Republican	Democratic
Popular vote	142,731	65,883
Percentage	65.64%	30.30%
- County results Boehner: 50–60% 60–70% 70–80%
U.S. Representative before election
John Boehner
Republican
Elected U.S. Representative
John Boehner
Republican

Republican Speaker of the House John Boehner, who had represented this district since 1991, ran for reelection. He ran against Democratic nominee and West Point Army veteran Justin Coussoule, Constitution Party nominee Jim Condit (campaign site, PVS), and Libertarian David Harlow (PVS) in the general election.

Boehner won the Republican primary with 49,639 votes (84%), winning against Manfred Schreyer and Tom McMasters.

- Race ranking and details from CQ Politics
- Campaign contributions from OpenSecrets
- Race profile at The New York Times
- OH - District 8 from OurCampaigns.com

=== Predictions ===
Source	Ranking	As of
The Cook Political Report	Safe R	November 1, 2010
Rothenberg	Safe R	November 1, 2010
Sabato's Crystal Ball	Safe R	November 1, 2010
RCP	Safe R	November 1, 2010
CQ Politics	Safe R	October 28, 2010
New York Times	Safe R	November 1, 2010
FiveThirtyEight	Safe R	November 1, 2010

=== Results ===
Ohio's 8th Congressional District House election, 2010
Party	Candidate	Votes	%
Republican	John Boehner (incumbent)	142,731	65.64%
Democratic	Justin Coussoule	65,883	30.30%
Libertarian	David Harlow	5,121	2.36%
Constitution	James Condit Jr.	3,701	1.70%
Total votes		217,436	100%
Republican hold			

== District 9 ==
2010 Ohio's 9th congressional district election
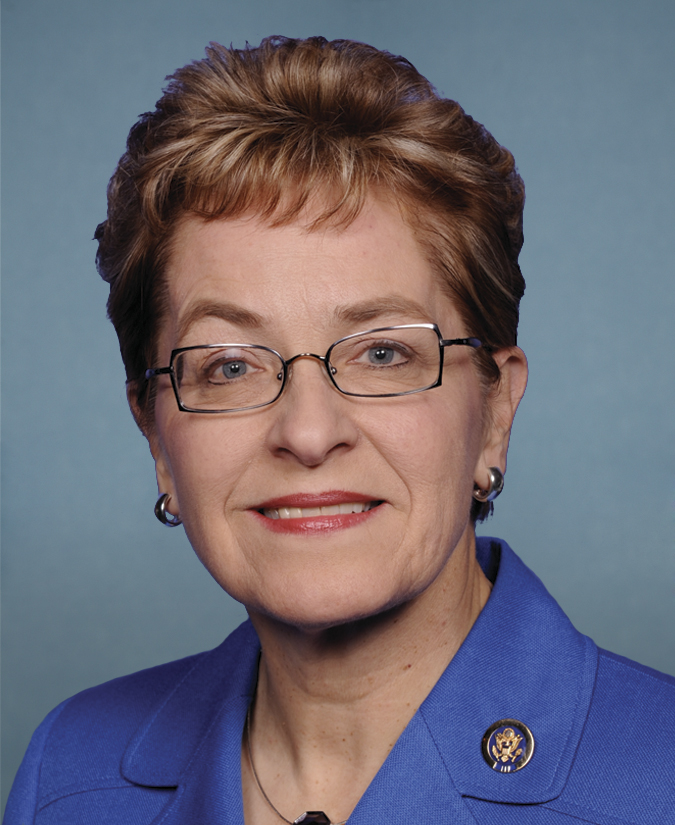

Nominee	Marcy Kaptur	Rich Iott
Party	Democratic	Republican
Popular vote	121,819	83,423
Percentage	59.4%	40.6%
- County results Kaptur: 50–60% 60–70% Iott: 50–60%
U.S. Representative before election
Marcy Kaptur
Democratic
Elected U.S. Representative
Marcy Kaptur
Democratic

Democratic incumbent Marcy Kaptur, who had represented this district since 1983, was running for reelection. She was challenged by Republican nominee businessman Rich Iott. Libertarian Jeremy D. Swartz dropped out in June for family reasons. Libertarian Joseph Jaffe withdrew on September 10. In 2008, Obama carried the district with 62% of the vote.

- Debate, Fox Toledo and Toledo Free Press, October 11, 2010 (30:46)
- Race ranking and details from CQ Politics
- Campaign contributions from OpenSecrets
- Race profile at The New York Times
- OH - District 9 from OurCampaigns.com

FEC, Campaign Finance as of 6/30/10

Candidate (party)	Receipts	Disbursements	Cash on hand	Debt
Rich Iott (R)	$876,968	$606,603	$324,091	$823,100
Marcy Kaptur (D)	$313,131	$223,776	$1,044,932	$0

=== Predictions ===
Source	Ranking	As of
The Cook Political Report	Safe D	November 1, 2010
Rothenberg	Safe D	November 1, 2010
Sabato's Crystal Ball	Safe D	November 1, 2010
RCP	Safe D	November 1, 2010
CQ Politics	Safe D	October 28, 2010
New York Times	Safe D	November 1, 2010
FiveThirtyEight	Safe D	November 1, 2010

=== Results ===
Ohio's 9th Congressional District House election, 2010
Party	Candidate	Votes	%
Democratic	Marcy Kaptur (incumbent)	121,819	59.35%
Republican	Rich Iott	83,423	40.65%
Total votes		205,242	100%
Democratic hold			

== District 10 ==
2010 Ohio's 10th congressional district election

Nominee	Dennis Kucinich	Peter J. Corrigan
Party	Democratic	Republican
Popular vote	101,340	83,807
Percentage	53.0%	43.9%
- County results Kucinich: 50–60%
U.S. Representative before election
Dennis Kucinich
Democratic
Elected U.S. Representative
Dennis Kucinich
Democratic

Democratic incumbent Dennis Kucinich had represented this district since 1997. He faced Republican Peter J. Corrigan (PVS) and Libertarian Jeff Goggins (PVS)in the general election. In 2008, Obama carried the district with 59% of the vote.

- Race ranking and details from CQ Politics
- Campaign contributions from OpenSecrets
- Race profile at The New York Times
- OH - District 10 from OurCampaigns.com

=== Predictions ===
Source	Ranking	As of
The Cook Political Report	Likely D	November 1, 2010
Rothenberg	Safe D	November 1, 2010
Sabato's Crystal Ball	Safe D	November 1, 2010
RCP	Likely D	November 1, 2010
CQ Politics	Safe D	October 28, 2010
New York Times	Safe D	November 1, 2010
FiveThirtyEight	Safe D	November 1, 2010

=== Results ===
Ohio's 10th Congressional District House election, 2010
Party	Candidate	Votes	%
Democratic	Dennis Kucinich (incumbent)	101,340	53.05%
Republican	Peter J. Corrigan	83,807	43.87%
Libertarian	Jeff Goggins	5,874	3.08%
Total votes		191,026	100%
Democratic hold			

== District 11 ==
2010 Ohio's 11th congressional district election
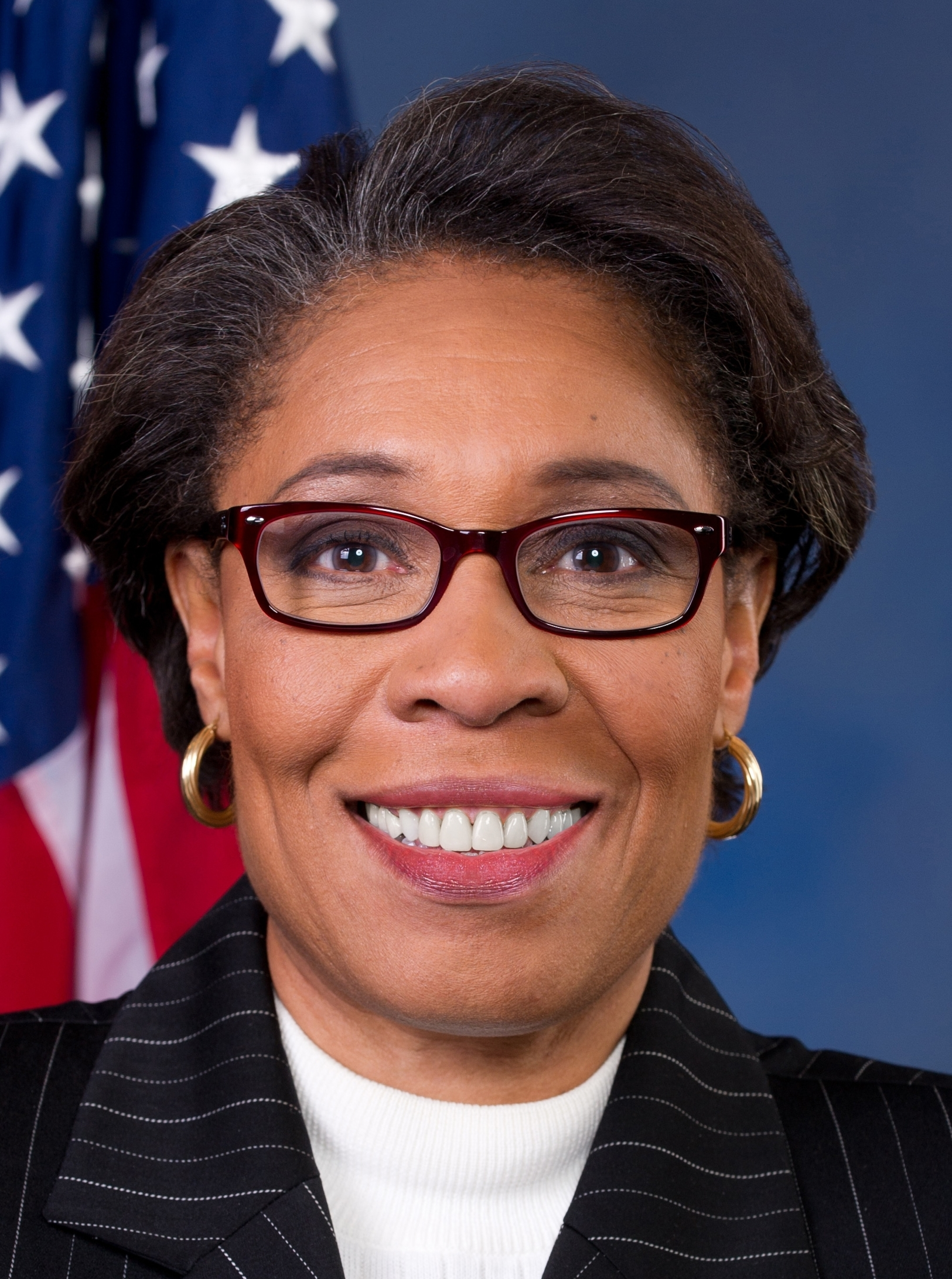

Nominee	Marcia Fudge	Thomas Pekarek
Party	Democratic	Republican
Popular vote	139,684	28,752
Percentage	82.9%	17.1%
- County results Fudge: 80–90%
U.S. Representative before election
Marcia Fudge
Democratic
Elected U.S. Representative
Marcia Fudge
Democratic

Democratic incumbent Marcia Fudge was challenged by Republican nominee Thomas Pekarek (PVS).

- Race ranking and details from CQ Politics
- Campaign contributions from OpenSecrets
- Race profile at The New York Times
- OH - District 11 from OurCampaigns.com

=== Predictions ===
Source	Ranking	As of
The Cook Political Report	Safe D	November 1, 2010
Rothenberg	Safe D	November 1, 2010
Sabato's Crystal Ball	Safe D	November 1, 2010
RCP	Safe D	November 1, 2010
CQ Politics	Safe D	October 28, 2010
New York Times	Safe D	November 1, 2010
FiveThirtyEight	Safe D	November 1, 2010

=== Results ===
Ohio's 11th Congressional District House election, 2010
Party	Candidate	Votes	%
Democratic	Marcia Fudge (incumbent)	139,684	82.93%
Republican	Thomas Pekarek	28,752	17.07%
Total votes		168,447	100%
Democratic hold			

== District 12 ==
2010 Ohio's 12th congressional district election
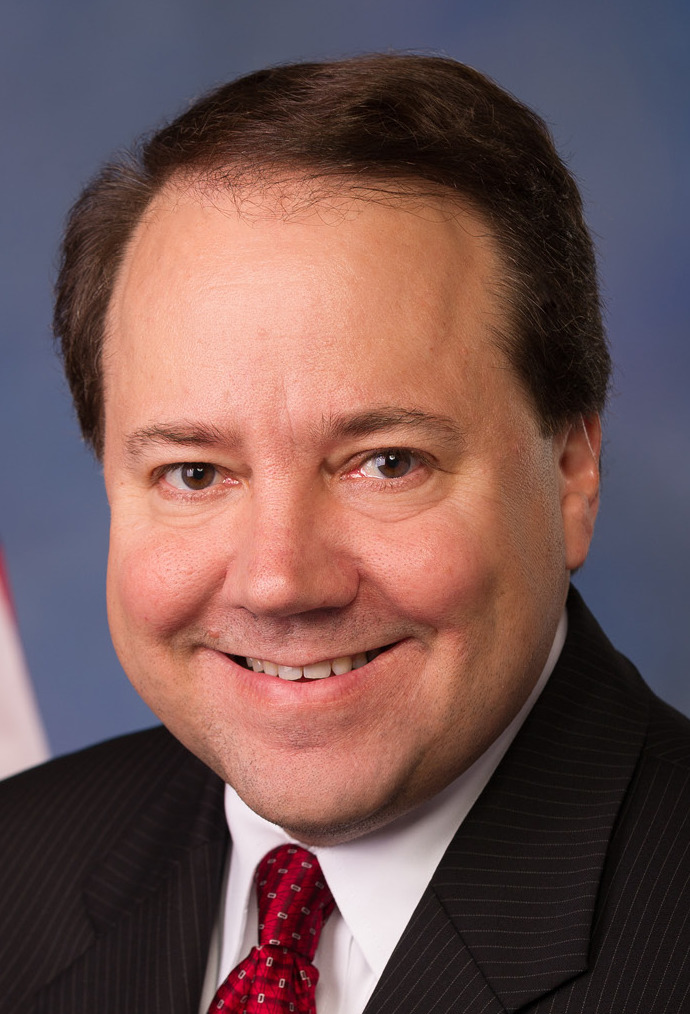

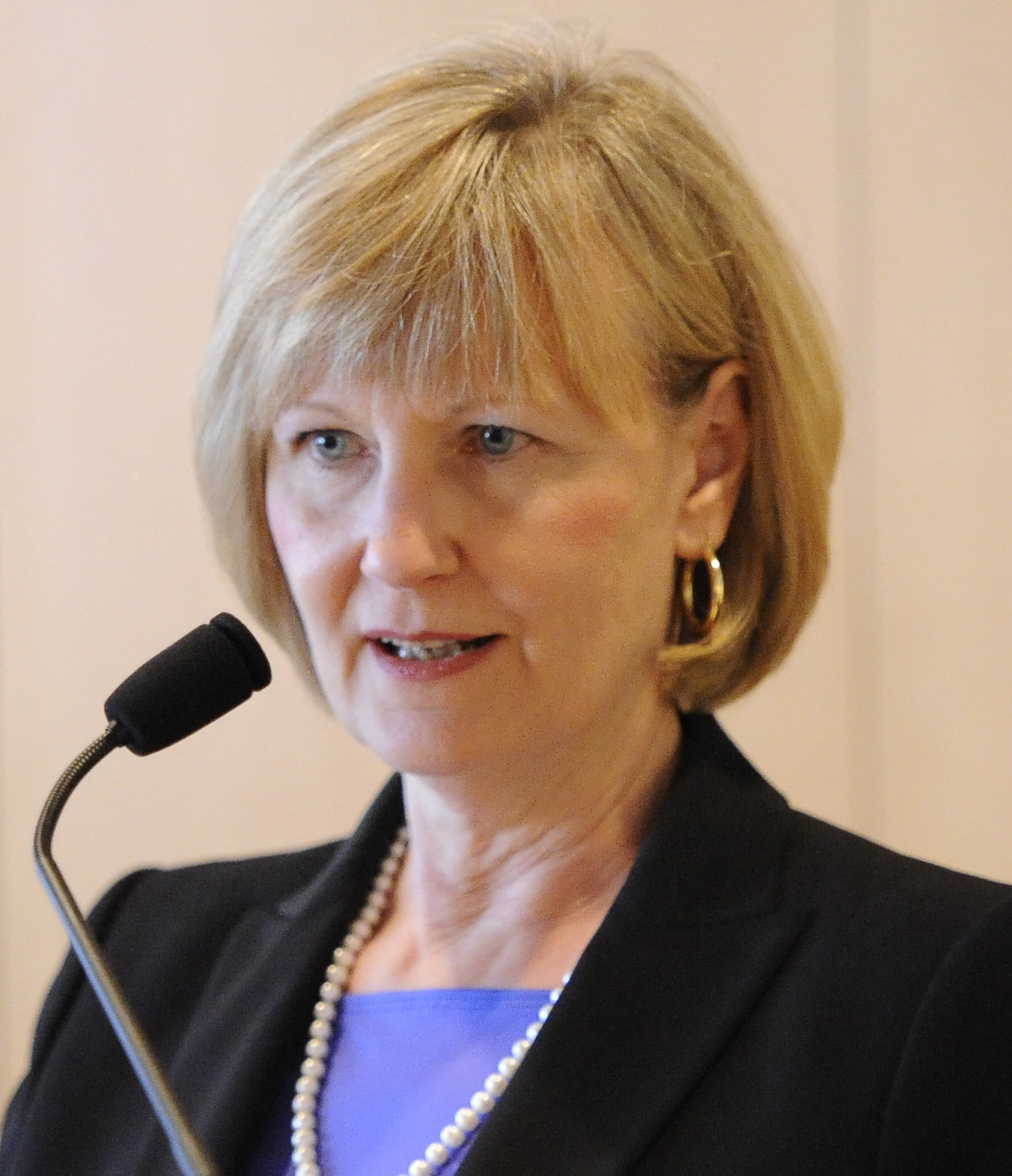
Nominee	Pat Tiberi	Paula Brooks
Party	Republican	Democratic
Popular vote	150,163	110,307
Percentage	55.8%	41.0%
- County results Tiberi: 60–70% 70–80% Brooks: 50–60%
U.S. Representative before election
Pat Tiberi
Republican
Elected U.S. Representative
Pat Tiberi
Republican

Republican incumbent Pat Tiberi had represented this district since 2001. He faced Democratic nominee and Franklin County Commissioner Paula Brooks (campaign site, PVS), and Libertarian nominee Travis M. Irvine (campaign site, PVS). In 2008, Obama carried the district with 54% of the vote.

- Race ranking and details from CQ Politics
- Campaign contributions from OpenSecrets
- Race profile at The New York Times
- OH - District 11 from OurCampaigns.com

=== Predictions ===
Source	Ranking	As of
The Cook Political Report	Likely R	November 1, 2010
Rothenberg	Safe R	November 1, 2010
Sabato's Crystal Ball	Likely R	November 1, 2010
RCP	Likely R	November 1, 2010
CQ Politics	Safe R	October 28, 2010
New York Times	Safe R	November 1, 2010
FiveThirtyEight	Safe R	November 1, 2010

=== Results ===
Ohio's 12th Congressional District House election, 2010
Party	Candidate	Votes	%
Republican	Pat Tiberi (incumbent)	150,163	55.79%
Democratic	Paula Brooks	110,307	40.98%
Libertarian	Travis Irvine	8,710	3.24%
Total votes		269,180	100%
Republican hold			

== District 13 ==
2010 Ohio's 13th congressional district election
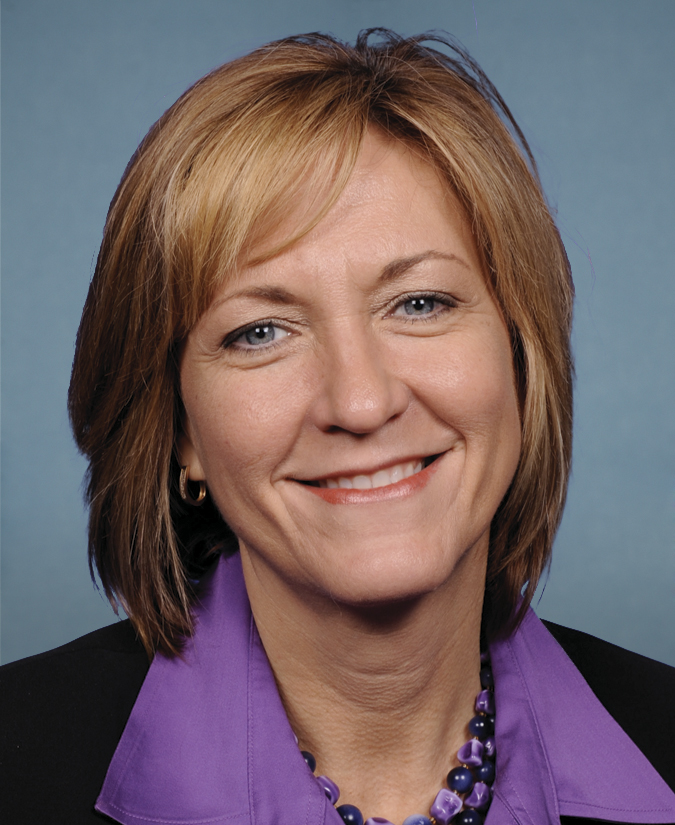

Nominee	Betty Sutton	Tom Ganley
Party	Democratic	Republican
Popular vote	118,806	94,367
Percentage	55.7%	44.3%
- County results Sutton: 50–60% 60–70% Ganley: 50–60%
U.S. Representative before election
Betty Sutton
Democratic
Elected U.S. Representative
Betty Sutton
Democratic

Democratic incumbent Betty Sutton had represented this district since 2007. She defeated Republican car dealer Tom Ganley in the 2010 general election.

- Race ranking and details from CQ Politics
- Campaign contributions from OpenSecrets
- Race profile at The New York Times
- OH - District 13 from OurCampaigns.com

=== Predictions ===
Source	Ranking	As of
The Cook Political Report	Likely D	November 1, 2010
Rothenberg	Likely D	November 1, 2010
Sabato's Crystal Ball	Likely D	November 1, 2010
RCP	Lean D	November 1, 2010
CQ Politics	Likely D	October 28, 2010
New York Times	Lean D	November 1, 2010
FiveThirtyEight	Safe D	November 1, 2010

=== Results ===
Ohio's 13th Congressional District House election, 2010
Party	Candidate	Votes	%
Democratic	Betty Sutton (incumbent)	118,806	55.73%
Republican	Tom Ganley	94,367	44.27%
Total votes		213,173	100%
Democratic hold			

== District 14 ==
2010 Ohio's 14th congressional district election
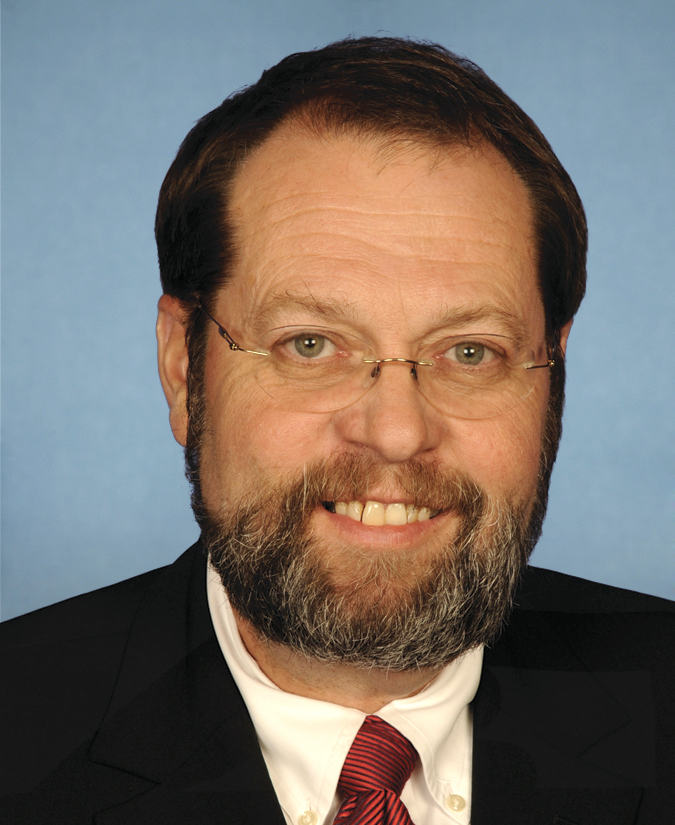

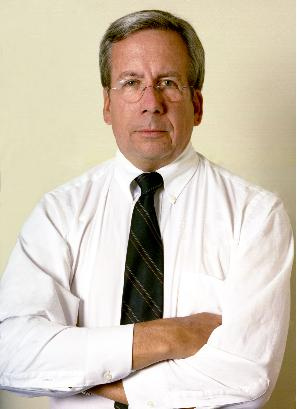
Nominee	Steven LaTourette	William O'Neill
Party	Republican	Democratic
Popular vote	149,878	72,604
Percentage	64.9%	31.4%
- County results Latourette: 50–60% 60–70%
U.S. Representative before election
Steven LaTourette
Republican
Elected U.S. Representative
Steven LaTourette
Republican

Republican incumbent Steven LaTourette had represented this district since 1995. He faced Democratic nominee and former Appellate Court judge William O'Neill in the general election, along with Libertarian nominee and accountant John Jelenic (PVS). In 2008, McCain carried the district with 49% of the vote.

- Race ranking and details from CQ Politics
- Campaign contributions from OpenSecrets
- Race profile at The New York Times
- OH - District 13 from OurCampaigns.com

=== Predictions ===
Source	Ranking	As of
The Cook Political Report	Safe R	November 1, 2010
Rothenberg	Safe R	November 1, 2010
Sabato's Crystal Ball	Safe R	November 1, 2010
RCP	Safe R	November 1, 2010
CQ Politics	Safe R	October 28, 2010
New York Times	Safe R	November 1, 2010
FiveThirtyEight	Safe R	November 1, 2010

=== Results ===
Ohio's 14th Congressional District House election, 2010
Party	Candidate	Votes	%
Republican	Steven LaTourette (incumbent)	149,878	64.92%
Democratic	William O'Neill	72,604	31.45%
Libertarian	John Jelenic	8,383	3.63%
Total votes		230,865	100%
Republican hold			

== District 15 ==
2010 Ohio's 15th congressional district election
- November 2, 2010
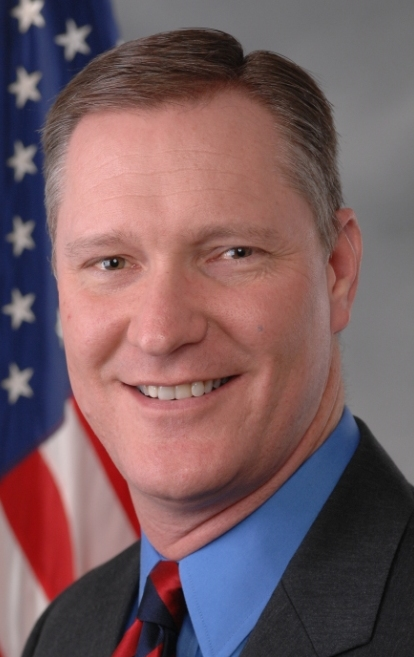

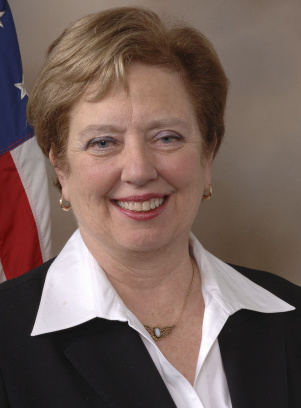
Nominee	Steve Stivers	Mary Jo Kilroy
Party	Republican	Democratic
Popular vote	119,741	91,077
Percentage	54.2%	41.3%
- County results Stivers: 50–60% 60–70% 70–80%
U.S. Representative before election
Mary Jo Kilroy
Democratic
Elected U.S. Representative
Steve Stivers
Republican

Democratic incumbent Mary Jo Kilroy faced four challengers: Constitution Party nominee David Ryon (campaign site, PVS), Libertarian nominee William J. Kammerer (PVS), independent perennial candidate Bill Buckel and Republican nominee Steve Stivers whom Kilroy defeated in 2008. Kilroy was defeated in 2010.

- Race ranking and details from CQ Politics
- Campaign contributions from OpenSecrets
- Race profile at The New York Times
- OH - District 15 from OurCampaigns.com

=== Predictions ===
Source	Ranking	As of
The Cook Political Report	Lean R (flip)	November 1, 2010
Rothenberg	Likely R (flip)	November 1, 2010
Sabato's Crystal Ball	Lean R (flip)	November 1, 2010
RCP	Likely R (flip)	November 1, 2010
CQ Politics	Likely R (flip)	October 28, 2010
New York Times	Lean R (flip)	November 1, 2010
FiveThirtyEight	Likely R (flip)	November 1, 2010

=== Results ===
Ohio's 15th Congressional District House election, 2010
Party	Candidate	Votes	%
Republican	Steve Stivers	119,741	54.16%
Democratic	Mary Jo Kilroy (incumbent)	91,077	41.29%
Libertarian	William Kammerer	6,116	2.77%
Constitution	David Ryon	3,887	1.76%
Independent	Bill Buckel	45	0.02%
Total votes		220,596	100%
Republican gain from Democratic			

== District 16 ==
2010 Ohio's 16th congressional district election
- November 2, 2010
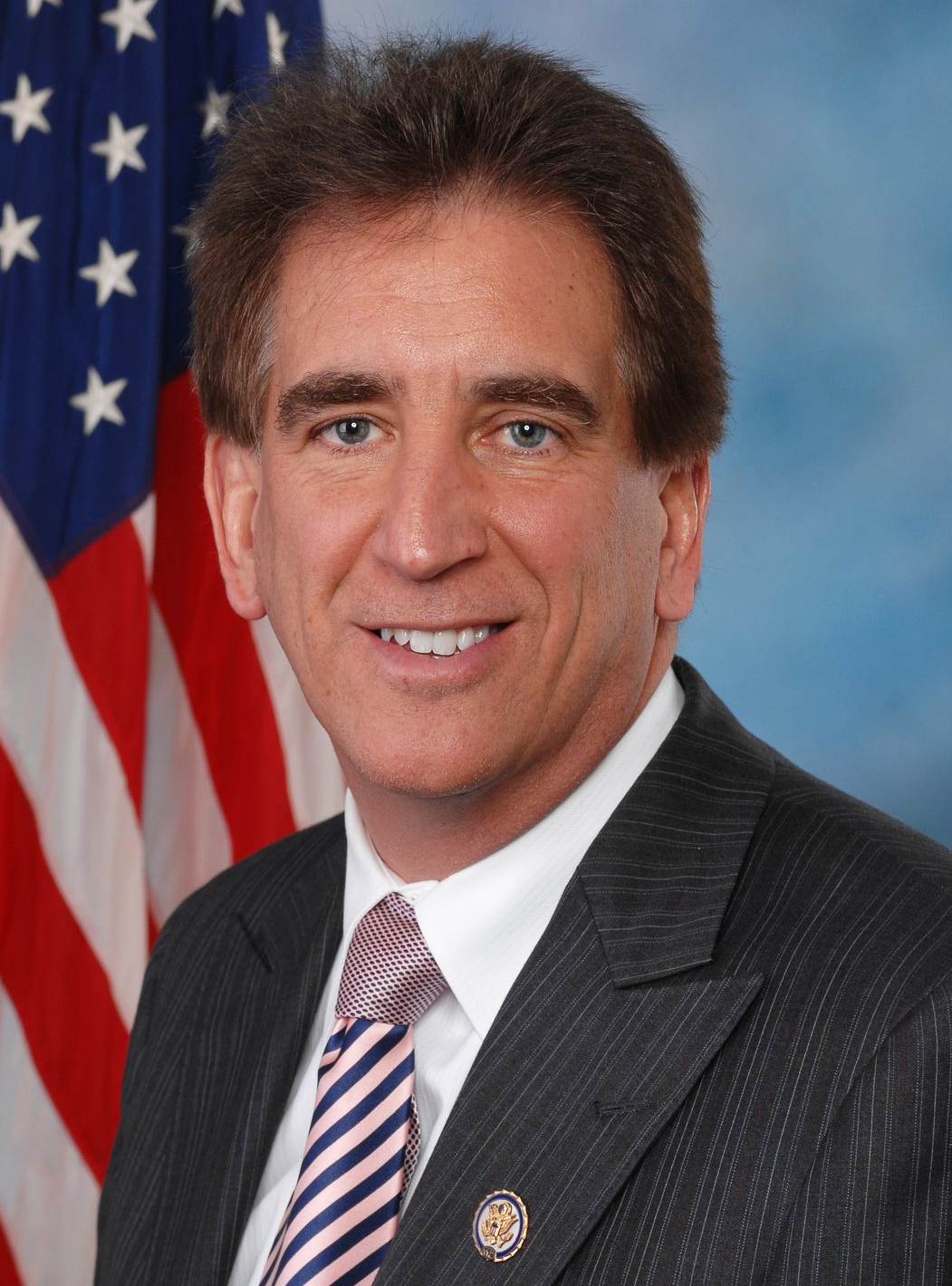

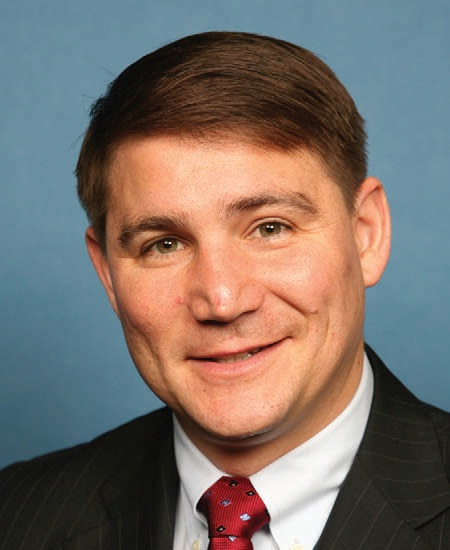
Nominee	Jim Renacci	John Boccieri
Party	Republican	Democratic
Popular vote	114,652	90,833
Percentage	52.1%	41.3%
- County results Renacci: 40–50% 50–60% 60–70%
U.S. Representative before election
John Boccieri
Democratic
Elected U.S. Representative
Jim Renacci
Republican

Democratic incumbent John Boccieri had represented this district since 2009. He was challenged by Republican businessman Jim Renacci and Libertarian Jeffrey Blevins (PVS). In 2008, McCain carried the district with 50% of the vote. Boccieri was defeated in 2010.

- Race ranking and details from CQ Politics
- Campaign contributions from OpenSecrets
- Race profile at The New York Times
- OH - District 16 from OurCampaigns.com

=== Debate ===
2010 Ohio's 16th congressional district debate
No.	Date	Host	Moderator	Link	Republican	Democratic	Libertarian
Key: P Participant A Absent N Not invited I Invited W Withdrawn							
Key: P Participant A Absent N Not invited I Invited W Withdrawn					John Boccieri	Jim Renacci	Jeffrey Blevins
1	Sep. 20, 2010	Wooster Area Chamber of Commerce	Louise Keating	YouTube (Part 1); Part 2, Part 3, Part 4 Part 5, Part 6	P	P	P

=== Predictions ===
Source	Ranking	As of
The Cook Political Report	Tossup	November 1, 2010
Rothenberg	Lean R (flip)	November 1, 2010
Sabato's Crystal Ball	Lean R (flip)	November 1, 2010
RCP	Lean R (flip)	November 1, 2010
CQ Politics	Tossup	October 28, 2010
New York Times	Tossup	November 1, 2010
FiveThirtyEight	Likely R (flip)	November 1, 2010

=== Results ===
Ohio's 16th Congressional District House election, 2010
Party	Candidate	Votes	%
Republican	Jim Renacci	114,652	52.08%
Democratic	John Boccieri (incumbent)	90,833	41.26%
Libertarian	Jeffrey Blevins	14,585	6.63%
Independent	Robert Ross	67	0.03%
Total votes		220,137	100%
Republican gain from Democratic			

== District 17 ==
2010 Ohio's 17th congressional district election
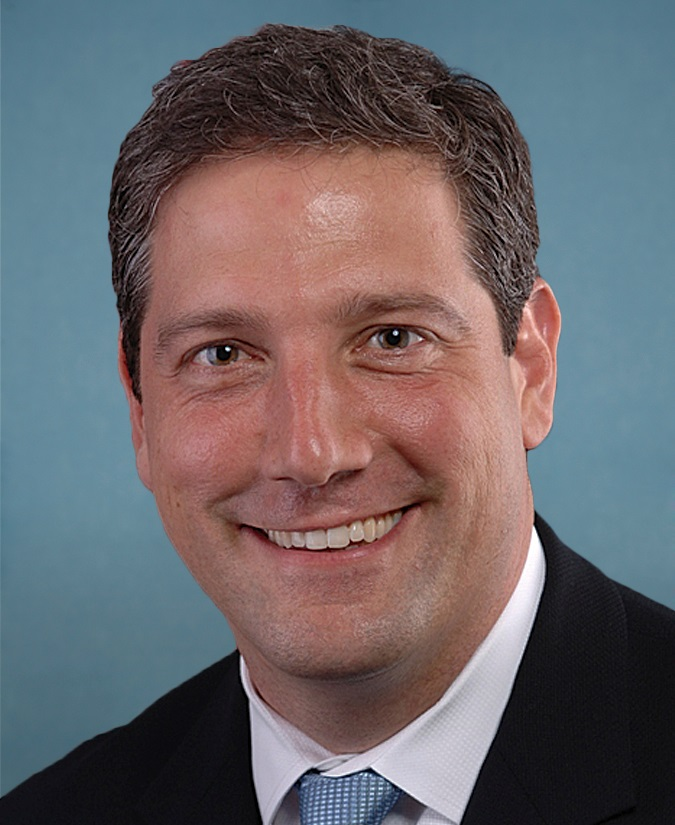

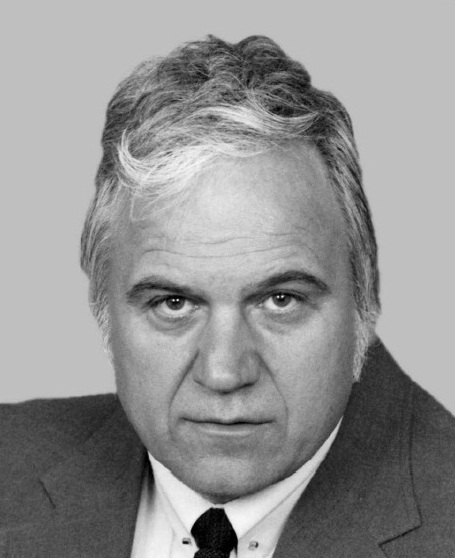
Nominee	Tim Ryan	Jim Graham	Jim Traficant
Party	Democratic	Republican	Independent
Popular vote	102,758	57,352	30,556
Percentage	53.9%	30.1%	16.0%
- County results Ryan: 40–50% 50–60% 60–70%
U.S. Representative before election
Tim Ryan
Democratic
Elected U.S. Representative
Tim Ryan
Democratic

Democratic incumbent Tim Ryan had represented this district since 2003. He faced Republican Jim Graham (campaign site, PVS) and Independent James Traficant, a former Democratic U.S. Congressman whom Ryan succeeded. In 2008, Obama carried the district with 62% of the vote.

- Race ranking and details from CQ Politics
- Campaign contributions from OpenSecrets
- Race profile at The New York Times
- OH - District 17 from OurCampaigns.com

=== Predictions ===
Source	Ranking	As of
The Cook Political Report	Safe D	November 1, 2010
Rothenberg	Safe D	November 1, 2010
Sabato's Crystal Ball	Safe D	November 1, 2010
RCP	Safe D	November 1, 2010
CQ Politics	Safe D	October 28, 2010
New York Times	Safe D	November 1, 2010
FiveThirtyEight	Safe D	November 1, 2010

=== Results ===
Ohio's 17th Congressional District House election, 2010
Party	Candidate	Votes	%
Democratic	Tim Ryan (incumbent)	102,758	53.89%
Republican	Jim Graham	57,352	30.08%
Independent	Jim Traficant	30,556	16.03%
Total votes		190,666	100%
Democratic hold			

== District 18 ==
2010 Ohio's 18th congressional district election
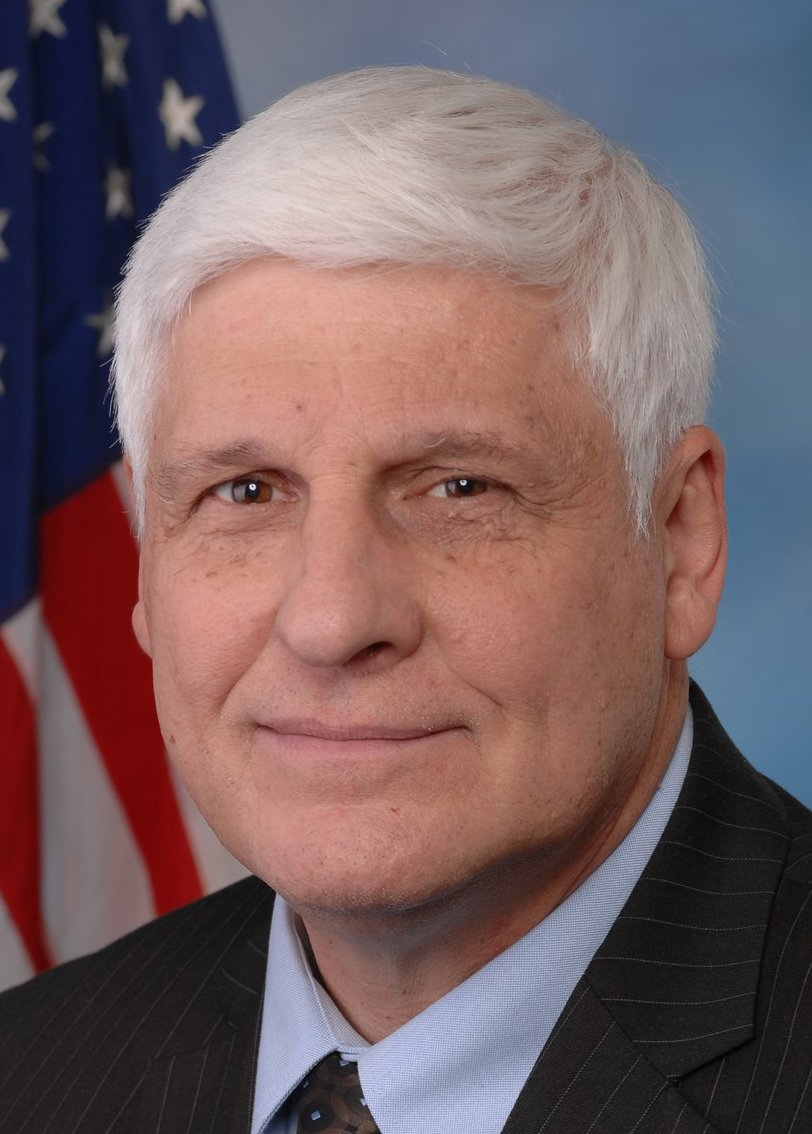

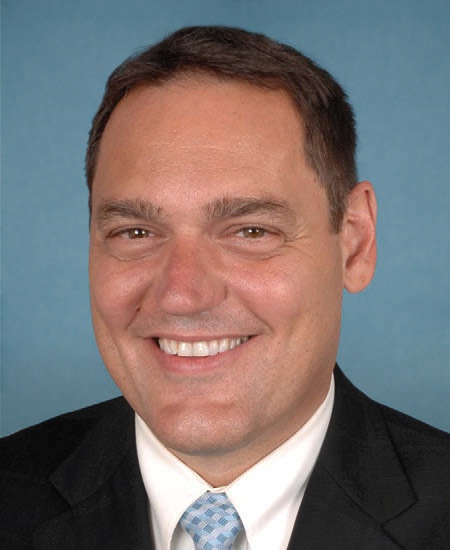

Nominee	Bob Gibbs	Zack Space	Lindsey Sutton
Party	Republican	Democratic	Constitution
Popular vote	107,426	80,756	11,244
Percentage	53.9%	40.5%	5.1%
- County results Gibbs: 40–50% 50–60% 60–70% 70–80% Space: 40–50% 60–70%
U.S. Representative before election
Zack Space
Democratic
Elected U.S. Representative
Bob Gibbs
Republican

Democratic incumbent Zack Space had represented this district since 2007. He was challenged by Republican nominee State Senator Bob Gibbs and Constitution Party nominee Lindsey Sutton (PVS). In 2008, McCain carried the district with 53% of the vote. Space was defeated in 2010.

- Race ranking and details from CQ Politics
- Campaign contributions from OpenSecrets
- Race profile at The New York Times
- OH - District 18 from OurCampaigns.com

=== Predictions ===
Source	Ranking	As of
The Cook Political Report	Tossup	November 1, 2010
Rothenberg	Tilt R (flip)	November 1, 2010
Sabato's Crystal Ball	Lean R (flip)	November 1, 2010
RCP	Lean R (flip)	November 1, 2010
CQ Politics	Tossup	October 28, 2010
New York Times	Tossup	November 1, 2010
FiveThirtyEight	Lean D	November 1, 2010

=== Debate ===
2010 Ohio's 18th congressional district debate
No.	Date	Host	Moderator	Link	Democratic	Republican
Key: P Participant A Absent N Not invited I Invited W Withdrawn						
Key: P Participant A Absent N Not invited I Invited W Withdrawn					Zack Space	Bob Gibbs
1	Oct. 22, 2010	WOSU-TV	Mike Thompson		P	P

=== Results ===
Ohio's 18th Congressional District House election, 2010
Party	Candidate	Votes	%
Republican	Bob Gibbs	107,426	53.86%
Democratic	Zack Space (incumbent)	80,756	40.49%
Constitution	Lindsey Sutton	11,244	5.64%
Independent	Mark Pitrone	20	0.01%
Total votes		199,448	100%
Republican gain from Democratic			

Ref: Official candidate list from the Ohio Secretary of State
