= W. Carlton Weddington =

American politician

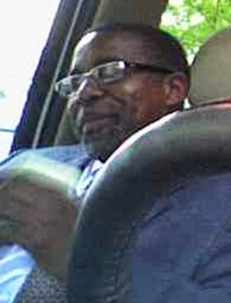
- Weddington accepting a bribe from the FBI

Member of the Ohio House of Representatives from the 27th district
- In office January 5, 2009 – March 13, 2012
- Preceded by: Joyce Beatty
- Succeeded by: Kevin Boyce

Personal details
- Born: April 4, 1970 (age 56) Columbus, Ohio
- Party: Democratic
- Education: Hampton University

Wilburn Carlton Weddington is a former member of the Ohio House of Representatives for the 27th District. He resigned his Ohio House seat after his indictment on bribery and ethics charges in March 2012, the first sitting state legislator in Ohio indicted for bribery in 100 years. Weddington was convicted of the charges and sentenced in June 2012 to three years in prison.

== Early life and education ==
Wilburn Carlton Weddington was born in Columbus, Ohio, on April 4, 1970, to Dr. Wilburn Harold Weddington, a family physician (and later professor emeritus of family medicine at the Ohio State University College of Medicine), and Rose Carline (Howard) Weddington. He was one of five children. He attended Hampton University and graduated with a B.A. in political science.

== Career ==
Weddington worked as an Ohio Department of Job and Family Services liaison, a member of the Columbus, Ohio School Board from 2006 to 2009, and as an Ohio School Board Association (OSBA) Trustee and OSBA president before election to the Ohio House of Representatives.

=== Ohio House of Representatives ===
With Minority Leader Joyce Beatty term limited in 2008, four vied to replace her in the House. In a benefit to Weddington, the Democratic House caucus endorsed his campaign. Weddington went on to win the primary to replace Beatty, defeating Mayo Makinde and H. Lee Thompson with 58% of the vote. In the general election, Weddington defeated Republican Jim Hunter by 28,000 votes.

Weddington served as Secretary of the Ohio Legislative Black Caucus PAC for the 128th General Assembly. Speaker of the House Armond Budish also appointed Weddington as Vice Chairman of the House Local Government and Public Administration Committee.

Weddington was challenged in the 2010 primary by former 26th District Representative Mike Mitchell. Weddington defeated Mitchell, winning by 4,000 votes. He went on to defeat Republican Meagan Cyrus in the general election by 17,000 votes.

He served as a member of the Local Government Committee, as well as on the committees of Criminal Justice; Finance and Appropriations and its Subcommittee on Health and Human Services; and Public Utilities. He was also a member of the Correctional Institution Inspection Committee and the Ohio Commission on Fatherhood.

==== Initiatives and positions ====
Weddington was quoted as being critical of Ohio Governor John Kasich's lack of cabinet diversity.

A contributor to the biennial transportation budget, Weddington criticized a measure to allow county clerks of court to act as deputy registrars, stating that it put small businesses at an unfair advantage. The measure ended up passing the Ohio House anyway.

Weddington said that Republicans were "trying to put some of us all in the back of the bus" by allowing the passage of a bill that requires photo ID to cast a ballot. He believed the bill disenfranchised African American voters.

=== Conviction for bribery ===
FBI Special Agents conducted an investigation concerning possible legislative misconduct after information came to the agency's attention in connection with payday loan legislation being considered at the Ohio Statehouse. Information later cited by an FBI spokesman as a trigger of the investigation was a 2009 email in which Weddington demanded that a lobbyist for the payday loan industry come through with some "serious cheese" or provide him with a suite to an upcoming Cleveland Cavaliers game. The FBI also cited an email Weddington sent in September 2009 in which he asked which lobbyists and associations could be approached for money because of his work on a DNA-testing bill.

Undercover FBI agents mounted an elaborate sting operation, creating a fake California wine company. In 2011, they spent more than $10,000 on fine dining and lavish trips to California and Miami for Weddington and his girlfriend, successfully persuading Weddington to draft a state budget amendment, and later a stand-alone bill, to help the company sell wine in Ohio. None of the bogus company's gifts were reported on Weddington's financial-disclosure statements for 2011.

On March 13, 2012, Weddington was indicted by a Franklin County grand jury for bribery, a third degree felony, election falsification, a fifth degree felony, and filing a false Ethics Disclosure statement, a first degree misdemeanor. The charges carried a maximum penalty of 4½ years in prison. The bribery count alleged that Weddington received cash and all-expense-paid trips to South Beach Miami, Florida and Napa Valley, California during 2011, as well as checks and cash for campaign contributions, in order to corrupt or influence him in the performance of his official duties as a State Representative. One count in the indictment charged that Weddington made false statements in the "Committee to Elect Weddington" 2011 annual campaign finance report filed with the Ohio Secretary of State. It was alleged that the report falsely stated the contributions and expenditures that were received by him and the committee, as well as the total figures for that campaign finance report. The indictment also charged Weddington with filing a false 2011 Ethics Financial Disclosure report with the Joint Legislative Ethics Committee, a report that all members of the Ohio General Assembly must file. Weddington failed to disclose gifts, travel, and lodging expenses that are required by law to be listed on that financial disclosure form. FBI agents approached Representative Weddington after the false financial disclosure report was filed in February 2012.

Following consultation with counsel, Weddington agreed to cooperate with the FBI and Franklin County prosecutor Ron O'Brien's office. The first step in that cooperation was an agreement to resign his elected position in the Ohio General Assembly, which he did on March 13, 2012. Also, Weddington withdrew his candidacy for re-election and requested that his name be removed from the November ballot. Prosecutor O'Brien commended the efforts of the FBI Special Agents involved for their work during the investigation and said that his research found no case of an Ohio General Assembly member being indicted for bribery in almost a century.

On June 18, 2012, Weddington was sentenced to three years in prison after pleading guilty in Franklin County Common Pleas Court to one count each of bribery and election falsification, both felonies, and one misdemeanor ethics violation. Weddington began serving his sentence in mid-August 2012; the sentencing judge was quoted at that time as being willing to consider granting Weddington judicial release after two years provided he had a good prison record.

On June 13, 2014, the Columbus Dispatch reported that Weddington's attorneys filed a motion seeking his early release in Franklin County Common Pleas Court. Attorney Karl Schneider wrote in the motion that Weddington was "humbled and rehabilitated" and had been a model inmate, providing literacy training to other inmates, completing several classes and participating in community service programs at the prison. If granted, it would have made Weddington eligible for release on August 17, 2014. On July 21, the Dispatch reported that the motion had been denied by Franklin County Judge Mark Serrott without further comment.

Weddington was granted early release from prison on October 30, 2014, 10 months before the completion of his original three-year sentence.
