= Paula Brooks (politician) =

American politician

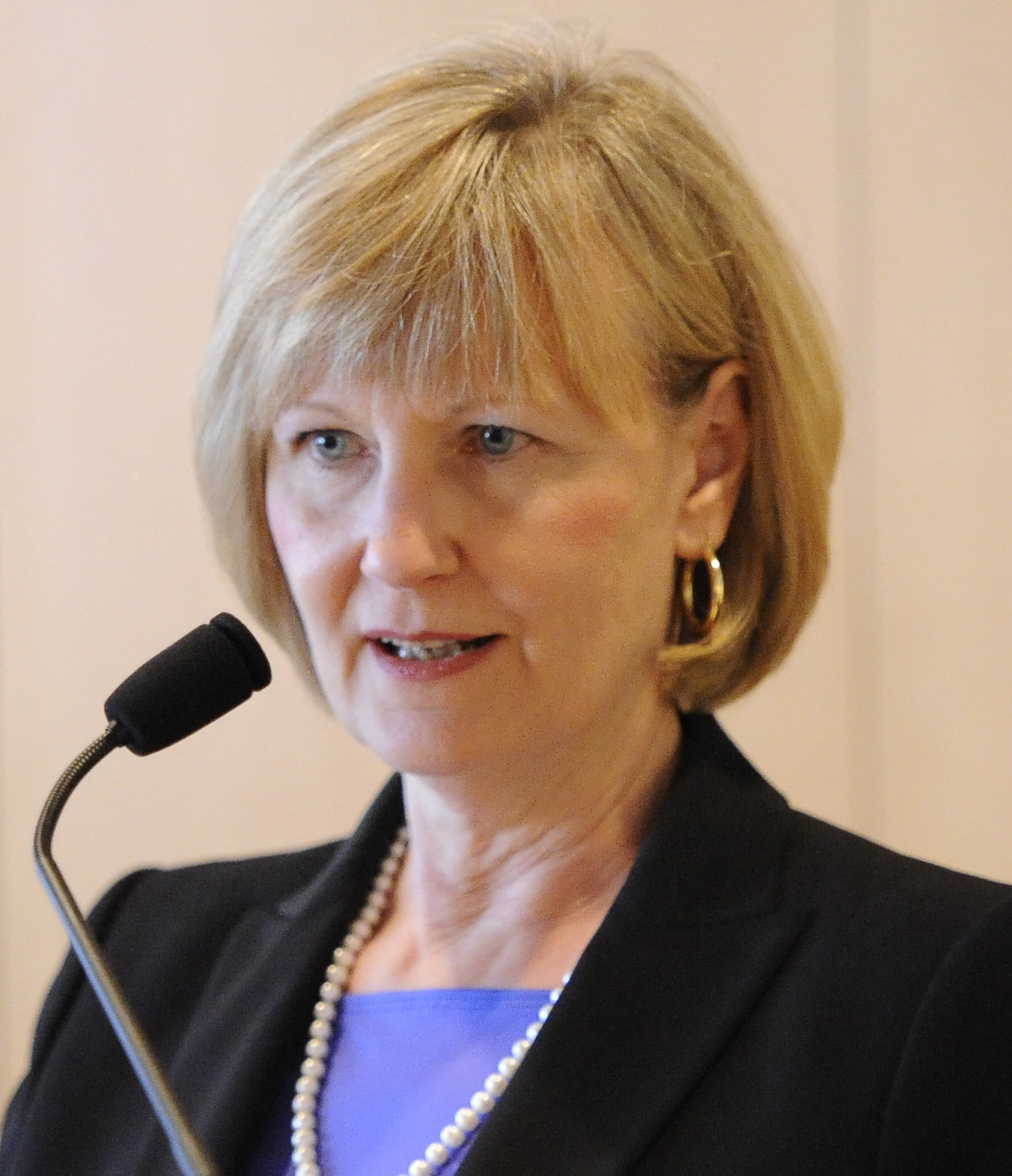

Franklin County Board of Commissioners
- In office January 2, 2005 – January 1, 2017
- Preceded by: Arlene Shoemaker
- Succeeded by: Kevin Boyce

Personal details
- Born: August 14, 1953 (age 73)
- Party: Democratic
- Spouse: Greg Kontras
- Education: Youngstown State University, B.A., Capital University Law School, J.D.
- Website: Board of Commissioners Website; Campaign Website

Paula L. Brooks (born August 14, 1953) is an American politician who is a former member of the Franklin County, Ohio Board of Commissioners.

== Early life, education and career ==
Brooks was raised on her family's farm in East Liverpool, Ohio as the oldest of five daughters. Her father was a Navy veteran and her mother was a nurse. Despite her family's humble financial situation, Brooks worked her way through Youngstown State University as a hairdresser, and subsequently earned her J.D. from Capital University Law School while working as an investigator at the office of Ohio Attorney General William J. Brown beginning in 1975.

After law school, Brooks worked for Ohio Governor Richard F. Celeste as Chief Counsel for the Ohio Department of Liquor beginning in 1985, and later as the assistant director of the Ohio Department of Administrative Services, managing a $3 billion budget, the state's largest department. Brooks then worked for several years in private practice with a focus on health care and employment law.

Brooks served on the Upper Arlington, Ohio City Council from 1996 to 2004, and was vice mayor from 1998 to 2002.

== Franklin County Commission ==
In November 2004, Brooks was elected to the Board of Commissioners, earning 57% of the vote to defeat Republican incumbent Arlene Shoemaker. During her tenure, Brooks was elected unanimously as board president, a largely ceremonial title, in 2006, 2009 and 2012.

In the November 2008 general election, Brooks defeated Republican challenger Angel Rhodes with 63% of the vote to retain her seat on the Board of Commissioners.

Brooks was re-elected in 2012, defeating Republican challenger James M. Pfaff with 64% of the vote.

In the March 15, 2016 Democratic primary election, Brooks was defeated in her bid for re-election to the Franklin County Board of Commissioners by State Representative Kevin Boyce, who received 58% of the vote to Brooks' 42%. In an unusual move, the Franklin County Democratic Party endorsed Boyce rather than the incumbent Brooks, in part as a consequence of Brooks' support for county Sheriff Zach Scott in his failed effort to oppose Andy Ginther, who received the party's endorsement for mayor of Columbus in the preceding general election. Scott was also defeated in the March 2016 primary election in his effort to continue as sheriff. Brooks' third term as a Commissioner ended on January 1, 2017, when she was replaced by Boyce.

== 2010 U.S. congressional campaign ==
Brooks ran unopposed in the Democratic primary and was the county party's candidate in the general election. She ran against Republican incumbent Pat Tiberi and Libertarian nominee Travis M. Irvine in Ohio's 12th Congressional District. Brooks raised $1,447,544, and garnered 40.98% of the final vote to Tiberi's 55.79%, while Irvine captured 3.24%.

== Other leadership roles ==
In 2010, Brooks was elected to a one-year term as president of the County Commissioners Association of Ohio (CCAO), a bi-partisan organization, and has served on the Association's Board of Directors from 2006 to the present. Her national leadership includes serving as chair of the National Association of Counties (NACo) Task Force on International Economic Development and the Subcommittee on Energy/Renewables. In 2013, Brooks was selected to serve on the White House Task Force on Climate Preparedness and Resilience, as its only Ohio member.
