= Kevin Boyce =

American politician

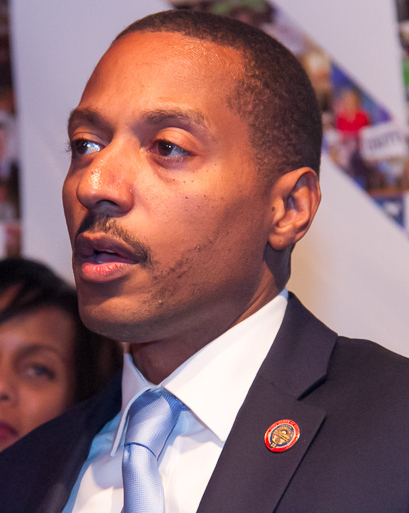

Member of the Franklin County Commission
- Incumbent
- Assumed office January 3, 2017
- Preceded by: Paula Brooks

Member of the Ohio House of Representatives from the 25th district
- In office May 6, 2012 – December 31, 2016
- Preceded by: W. Carlton Weddington
- Succeeded by: Bernadine Kent

47th Treasurer of Ohio
- In office January 7, 2009 – January 9, 2011
- Governor: Ted Strickland
- Preceded by: Richard Cordray
- Succeeded by: Josh Mandel

Member of the Columbus City Council
- In office September 11, 2000 – January 6, 2009
- Preceded by: Frederick Ransier
- Succeeded by: Michelle Mills

Personal details
- Born: Kevin Lewis Boyce; October 5, 1971 (age 55) Columbus, Ohio, U.S.
- Party: Democratic
- Spouses: Crystal Hall (m. 1997, separated); Emilia Sykes (m. 2022)
- Children: 2
- Education: University of Toledo (BA); Central Michigan University (MPA)
- Website: Campaign website

Kevin Lewis Boyce (born October 5, 1971) is an American politician and a member of the Democratic Party who currently serves as President of the Franklin County Board of Commissioners. Formerly, he was a member of the Ohio House of Representatives from the 25th District from 2012 to 2016, a member of Columbus City Council, and was the Ohio State Treasurer from 2009 to 2010.

In the March 2016 Democratic primary election, Boyce was selected as the Democratic nominee to run for incumbent Paula Brooks' seat on the Franklin County, Ohio Board of Commissioners in the 2016 general election. Boyce ran for, and was elected to a second term in 2020 and a third term in 2024.

== Education ==
Boyce graduated from Columbus East High School in 1990. He obtained a Bachelor of Arts degree in political science from the University of Toledo in 1995 and a Master of Public Administration degree from Central Michigan University in 2004.

== Career ==
Prior to holding political office, Boyce was the executive director of the KnowledgeWorks Foundation, a nonprofit organization that promotes college access for high school students. He was also the executive director of the Ohio Legislative Black Caucus from 1997 to 1999. He managed Charleta B. Tavares' unsuccessful campaign for Ohio Secretary of State in 1998, and was Chief of Staff for the Minority Caucus of the Ohio House of Representatives from January 1999 to September 2000.

On September 11, 2000, Boyce was appointed to Columbus City Council. He was elected to one of three open Council seats in the November 6, 2001 election and won another four-year Council term on November 8, 2005. On the council, Boyce ultimately served as President pro Tempore and as Chairman of the Finance and Zoning Committees.

On December 23, 2008, Democratic Governor Ted Strickland announced Boyce's appointment as Ohio State Treasurer, to replace Richard Cordray, who left office in November 2008 to become Ohio Attorney General. On January 8, 2009, Boyce was sworn into office, becoming the first African-American Democrat to hold a statewide, non-judicial office in Ohio. In July 2009, the Dayton Daily News reported that Boyce’s office spent $32,469 on promotional items bearing his name. Boyce said such outreach materials were commonly used by statewide offices and that his office’s total was about 30% less than his predecessor’s. During the 2010 campaign, Boyce’s Republican opponent, state Rep. Josh Mandel, criticized the spending as inappropriate in light of the state’s budget constraints. Contemporary coverage also noted that other statewide offices purchased similar materials or defended them as informational in nature.

In July 2009, Boyce’s office awarded a $160,000-per-year contract to KeyBank to process approximately 485,000 state checks per month, replacing a system that had been handled in-house for about a century. The Treasurer’s office projected about $83,000 in annual savings and said the contract was competitively bid, with bids due July 15 and KeyBank selected on July 20. Questions reported at the time focused on the timing and appearance of the arrangement, as a $500-per-person fundraiser in Cleveland hosted by KeyBank lobbyists for Boyce occurred one week after the contract was awarded; the office stated that political contributions did not influence the procurement.

=== State Treasurer ===
Boyce ran for the Treasurer's position for the first time during the 2010 midterm elections against Republican challenger Josh Mandel, but lost the election with 40.2% of the vote.

After losing re-election in 2010, Boyce recommended his top aide, Amer Ahmad, to Chicago Mayor Rahm Emanuel for Comptroller of Chicago, even though Boyce had received federal subpoenas asking about Ahmad's involvement in contracts given to a Boston bank. Ahmad was indicted in August 2013, charged with eight counts of bribery, wire fraud and conspiracy for his actions as Ohio deputy treasurer under Boyce. Ahmad is a fugitive from justice in Pakistan. He was sentenced to 15 years in US prison, but is unlikely to be extradited.

The National Council of Negro Women presented Boyce its Community Service Plaque in May 2004. He was honored by the Phi Beta Sigma fraternity and Leadership At Its Best LLC as an outstanding role model for young men in November 2004.

=== Ohio House of Representatives ===
When W. Carlton Weddington was indicted in a bribery scandal in early 2012, he resigned his seat, forcing House Democrats to appoint his successor. It was soon after announced that Boyce would be the appointee, chosen over a number of applicants. Boyce was sworn into office on May 6, 2012. In 2012, Boyce won his first full term in the House with 85.84% of the vote over Republican Seth Golding.

In 2014, Boyce won a second term with 81% of the vote, and was elected soon after to serve as Minority Whip as well. He was also the only Democrat to hold a Chairmanship in the 131st Ohio General Assembly, as the Chair of the Committee on Community and Family Advancement's Subcommittee on Minority Affairs.

==== Committee assignments ====
- Committee on Community & Family Advancement
  - Subcommittee on Minority Affairs (Chair)
- Committee on Finance & Appropriations
- Committee on Rules & Reference

=== Franklin County Board of Commissioners ===
In the March 15, 2016 Democratic primary election, Boyce defeated incumbent Paula Brooks in her bid for re-election to the Franklin County Board of Commissioners, receiving 58% of the vote to Brooks' 42%. In an unusual move, the Franklin County Democratic Party endorsed Boyce rather than the incumbent Brooks, in part as a consequence of Brooks' support for county sheriff Zach Scott in his failed effort to oppose Andy Ginther, who received the party's endorsement for mayor of Columbus in the preceding general election. Scott was also defeated in the March 2016 primary election in his effort to continue as county sheriff. Boyce then defeated his Republican opponent Terry Boyd in the November, 2016 general election.

On November 3, 2020, Boyce defeated his Republican challenger Andrew Littler to earn a 2nd term on the Franklin County, Ohio Board of Commissioners. In the 2024 general election, Boyce ran unopposed for this 3rd term as a commissioner and was reelected.

== Personal life ==
In 1997, Boyce married Crystal Hall and had two children. They later separated. On September 10, 2022, Boyce married U.S. representative Emilia Sykes at the Akron Art Museum.

== Electoral history ==
Election results
Year	Office	Election	Votes for Boyce	%	Opponent	Party	Votes	%
2001	Columbus City Council	General	44,898 (3rd)*	20.90%				
2005	Columbus City Council	General	63,467 (2nd)*	23.43%				
2010	Ohio State Treasurer	General	1,471,727	40.21%	Josh Mandel	Republican	2,008,892	54.89%
2012	Ohio House of Representatives	General	40,005	85.84%	Seth Golding	Republican	6,599	14.16%
2014	Ohio House of Representatives	General	18,317	81.66%	Seth Golding	Republican	4,115	18.34%
2016	Franklin County, Ohio Board of Commissioners	Primary	71,225	57.84%	Paula Brooks	Democratic	51,913	42.16%
2016	Franklin County, Ohio Board of Commissioners	General	313,583	58.69%	Terry Boyd	Republican	220,754	41.31%
2020	Franklin County, Ohio Board of Commissioners	General	392,675	64.78%	Andrew Littler	Republican	213,516	35.22%
2024	Franklin County, Ohio Board of Commissioners	General	390,898	100%				

* Top three are elected to Columbus City Council

Party political offices
Preceded by Richard Cordray	Democratic nominee for Ohio State Treasurer; 2010	Succeeded by Connie Pillich
Political offices
Preceded by Richard Cordray	Treasurer of Ohio; 2009–2011	Succeeded by Josh Mandel
