= Josh Mandel =

American politician (born 1977)

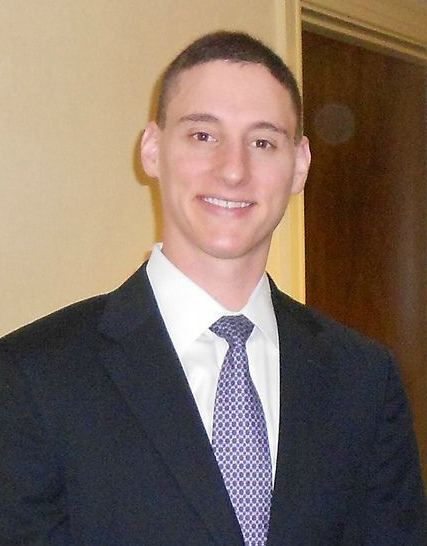
- Mandel in 2012

48th Treasurer of Ohio
- In office January 10, 2011 – January 14, 2019
- Governor: John Kasich
- Preceded by: Kevin Boyce
- Succeeded by: Robert Sprague

Member of the Ohio House of Representatives from the 17th district
- In office January 1, 2007 – January 1, 2011
- Preceded by: Jim Trakas
- Succeeded by: Marlene Anielski

Personal details
- Born: Joshua Aaron Mandel; September 27, 1977 (age 49) Cleveland, Ohio, U.S.
- Party: Republican
- Spouses: Ilana Shafran (m. 2008; div. 2020); Alyssa Strayer (m. 2025)
- Children: 3
- Education: Ohio State University (BA); Case Western Reserve University (JD)

Military service
- Allegiance: United States
- Branch/service: Marine Corps Reserve
- Years of service: 2000–2008
- Rank: Sergeant
- Battles/wars: Iraq War

Joshua Aaron Mandel (born September 27, 1977) is an American politician who served as the treasurer of Ohio from 2011 to 2019. A member of the Republican Party, he previously was the Ohio state representative for the 17th district from 2007 to 2011. He was the unsuccessful Republican challenger to Democratic incumbent Sherrod Brown in the 2012 U.S. Senate election.

In 2016, Mandel announced his intention to challenge Brown again in 2018, but later withdrew from the race. In 2022, he ran again for the Senate, but lost the primary election to future Vice President JD Vance. Mandel has been characterized as far-right.

== Early life and education ==
Mandel was born on September 27, 1977, in Cleveland, Ohio, to a Jewish family, the son of Rita (née Friedman) and Bruce Mandel. His maternal grandfather, Joe, emigrated from Poland and was a Holocaust survivor, while his maternal grandmother, Fernanda, was originally from Italy and was hidden from the Nazis by Christian families during World War II. Mandel has a sister, Rachel.

He attended Beachwood High School in Beachwood, Ohio, where he played football and served as the team's quarterback.

Mandel later attended Ohio State University, where he earned a bachelor's degree. While at Ohio State, he served two terms as president of the undergraduate student government. After graduating in 2000, he earned a Juris Doctor degree from the Case Western Reserve University School of Law.

== Career ==
=== Military service ===
Mandel enlisted in the United States Marine Corps Reserve, where he served eight years as an intelligence specialist. His first tour was from February to November 2004, during which he was attached to a light armored reconnaissance battalion. He left for his second tour in September 2007. Attached to an infantry battalion, Mandel served in the city of Haditha.

=== Lyndhurst city council ===
Mandel was elected to the Lyndhurst, Ohio, city council in 2003. He was on the council's finance committee.

In January 2005, Mandel sent a letter to Lyndhurst residents, proposing a one-time tax rebate of $400, paying the postage for the letters from his campaign fund. Faced with opposition from fellow council members, Mandel introduced and advocated for a 2 mill property tax rollback, which would have saved the average homeowner $100 a year on a home valued at $160,000. On April 4, 2005, the council passed a 1.5 mil rollback that saved the average homeowner $75 per year.

=== Ohio House of Representatives ===
==== Elections ====
Mandel was first elected to the Ohio House of Representatives in November 2006. He represented Ohio's 17th House district, consisting of 17 communities of various sizes in southeastern Cuyahoga County. Mandel was re-elected to a second term in 2008.

==== Tenure ====
Mandel's first piece of legislation as a state representative, H.B. 151, was an initiative to force Ohio's multibillion-dollar pension funds to divest from companies doing business in Iran. He joined State Representative Shannon Jones (R) in an attempt to make Ohio the first state in the nation to divest from Iran, but the legislation was never signed into law due to a compromise between state pension executives and Ohio House leadership, agreed to by Mandel. Then-Speaker of the Ohio House Jon Husted brokered a deal to drop half of the state's investments in Iran and Sudan with the eventual goal of removing all investment from the two countries.

In the 128th Assembly, Mandel was one of 19 House members to vote against legislation to make cockfighting a felony. Mandel said that the legislation was not a pressing priority for the state and that the General Assembly should spend its time in other ways.

Also in the 128th Assembly, Mandel voted against legislation that "[p]rohibits discriminatory practices on the basis of 'sexual orientation' and 'gender identity' under many of the Ohio Civil Rights Commission (OCRC) Law's existing prohibitions against various unlawful discriminatory practices". The bill passed the Ohio House by a vote of 56 to 39.

=== State Treasurer ===
In May 2009, Mandel announced his candidacy for Ohio Treasurer of State via web video. Mandel's campaign generated controversy in late September 2010 when it ran a TV commercial falsely suggesting that Mandel's opponent, African-American Kevin Boyce, was a Muslim. The commercial was criticized for playing on anti-Muslim bias, and was ultimately withdrawn by the Mandel campaign. However, voters subsequently received a campaign mailing with similar themes. The Mandel campaign said that the Ohio Republican Party was responsible for the mailers, which had already been sent via bulk mail. In October 2010, in response to an Ohio Democratic Party complaint, the Ohio Elections Commission found that Mandel had deceptively depicted Boyce (an African Methodist Episcopal) as a Muslim in the ads.

On November 2, 2010, Mandel was elected Ohio State Treasurer, defeating Boyce by 14 percentage points to become chief investment officer of state funds. Mandel was sworn in on January 10, 2011.

During Mandel's time as treasurer, Ohio retained the highest possible rating from Standard & Poor's for the state's $4 billion government investment fund. On March 19, 2012, Mandel severed contracts with two major banks that handled $41 billion in Ohio pension investments, amid government investigations into whether the banks overcharged clients for currency trading, accusing them of "systematically exploiting public pension funds and taxpayers".

Mandel was reelected to a second term as state treasurer in 2014, defeating Democratic state representative Connie Pillich.

==== OhioCheckbook.com ====
In December 2014, Mandel launched OhioCheckbook.com, a website that reports every expenditure in state government, in an effort, according to Mandel, to "create an army of citizen watchdogs who have the power to hold politicians accountable". Because there was no coordination with a similar effort undertaken by then-Governor John Kasich, Ohio ran two overlapping disclosure sites for several years. In June 2020, the state of Ohio merged the two sites, saving nearly a million dollars.

==== STABLE Accounts ====
In summer 2015, Ohio passed legislation granting the Ohio Treasurer's Office the authority to open and administer ABLE accounts; such accounts are a federally authorized, state-run savings program for eligible people with disabilities. In June 2016, Mandel began offering the nation's first ABLE accounts, called in Ohio "STABLE Accounts". The Ohio Treasurer's Office, in addition to administering Ohio's STABLE Accounts, also jointly administers the ABLE accounts in Arizona, Georgia, Kentucky, Missouri, New Hampshire, New Mexico, Oklahoma, South Carolina, Vermont, West Virginia and Wyoming.

==== Advertising controversy ====
In 2016 and 2017, the Ohio Treasurer's Office under Mandel spent almost $1.7 million in taxpayer-funded television ads, featuring him and Urban Meyer, the head coach for the Ohio State Buckeyes football team. Mandel's office made each payment for the ads to individual television stations in an amount less than $50,000 per fiscal year, thus circumventing the need for approval by the state controlling board, which must sign off on state payments over this amount. Thirteen ad buys were within $1,000 of the $50,000 threshold. Mandel defended the ads, saying they helped increase awareness of an investment program for disabled Ohioans. Critics questioned the airing of self-promotional ads at a time when Mandel was running for U.S. Senate and said that Mandel's office was trying to avoid scrutiny by structuring the ad buys to avoid Controlling Board approval.

In response to the controversy, the Ohio House introduced an amendment to the state's 2017 budget. The amendment would require approval by the Controlling Board for ad buys that in aggregate exceed $50,000. This rule would have prevented Mandel from avoiding oversight by distributing the advertising campaign among individual ad buys. Mandel did not attend an Ohio Senate hearing on the matter. He sent a deputy instead.

==== OhioCrypto.com ====
In November 2018, Mandel made Ohio the first U.S. state to allow taxpayers to pay taxes with cryptocurrency. Mandel's initiative, OhioCrypto.com, allowed Ohio taxpayers to pay tax bills in Bitcoin; he described the initiative as a way to project Ohio as a state that is embracing blockchain technology. Mandel described himself as a cryptocurrency enthusiast and said that he hoped the launch of OhioCrypto.com would bring more legitimacy to cryptocurrency. Ohio Attorney General Yost subsequently found "The Treasurer's use of a payment processor to convert cryptocurrency into dollars for the payment of taxes is not authorized, expressly or impliedly, by statutes allowing the receipt of electronic payments." Mandel's successor suspended the program, noting that it had processed fewer than ten transactions.

=== 2012 U.S. Senate election ===
Mandel was the Republican nominee to challenge Democratic incumbent Sherrod Brown in the 2012 election for U.S. Senate from Ohio. Mandel officially announced his candidacy for U.S. Senate on March 1, 2012. He won the March 6, 2012, Republican primary with 63% of the vote in a five-candidate race.

Mandel earned the endorsement of several prominent conservative politicians, including New Jersey Governor Chris Christie, Florida Sen. Marco Rubio, and Sen. John McCain. Mandel also received the endorsements of U.S. Sen. Rob Portman and U.S. Rep. Jim Jordan.

Mandel's campaign was singled out by the independent fact-checking group PolitiFact for its "casual relationship with the truth" and its tendency to "double down" after inaccuracies were pointed out. PolitiFact wrote: "For all the gifts Mandel has, from his compelling personal narrative as an Iraq war veteran to a well-oiled fundraising machine, whoppers are fast becoming a calling card of his candidacy."

Mandel had raised $7.2 million through the first quarter of 2012; his $5.3 million cash on hand trailed Brown's $6.3 million. Mandel benefited from support from conservative out-of-state superPACs. As of July 2012, these outside groups—including Crossroads GPS—aired $10 million in TV advertising supporting Mandel and attacking Brown, outspending Democratic Party-aligned outside groups by a margin of more than five-to-one. Mandel's campaign was aided by over $1 million spent primarily on attack ads by a 501(c)(4) organization called the "Government Integrity Fund".

A few days before the election, several of Mandel's relatives published an open letter in the Cleveland Jewish News criticizing Mandel for his anti-gay views, stating that his own cousin, a graduate of the US Air Force Academy, was married to another woman, and that Mandel believed LGBT people "should be forced to live a life of secrecy and lies".

Brown defeated Mandel 51%-45% in the November 6, 2012 general election.

In August 2013, the Ohio Democratic Party and EMILY's List accused Mandel of violating federal and state campaign laws by using a vehicle owned by his U.S. Senate campaign for personal purposes. The vehicle was involved in a traffic accident on March 5, 2013, nearly four months after Mandel's Senate campaign had ended; he was a passenger in the vehicle when the accident occurred. Mandel contended that he had done nothing improper.

=== 2018 U.S. Senate election ===
In December 2016, Mandel announced that he would seek election to the United States Senate in 2018.

In late 2016, a Super PAC called Ohio Freedom Fund was created to support Mandel's Senate bid. As of April 2017, the Ohio Freedom Fund's primary contributor is Citizens for a Working America, a nonprofit organization not subject to campaign finance disclosures. At the time that the Ohio Freedom Fund Super PAC was created, Mandel, in his capacity as state treasurer, was appearing in a series of advertisements promoting a new investment program for families with special needs children. Mandel's office said the ads were taped and aired before Mandel was a candidate for U.S. Senate.

In July 2017, Mandel stated his support for alt-right activists and conspiracy theorists Mike Cernovich and Jack Posobiec after they were criticized in an Anti-Defamation League (ADL) report. Mandel accused the ADL of being a "partisan witchhunt group" and tweeted: "I stand with @Cernovich & @JackPosobiec."

Mandel dropped out of the race on January 5, 2018, citing the need to spend more time with his family relating to his wife's health issues.

=== 2022 U.S. Senate election ===
Senator Rob Portman announced in late January 2021 that he would not be seeking re-election to the Senate, citing gridlock and partisanship. Mandel mulled running in the election, and later confirmed that he would run. Declaring his candidacy, Mandel touted his support for President Donald Trump, although he had initially endorsed Marco Rubio for the party's nomination in the 2016 presidential election and voted for him in that year's Ohio Republican primary.

In March 2021, Mandel was suspended from Twitter for 12 hours for creating a poll about which type of "illegals" would commit more crimes, "Muslim Terrorists" or "Mexican Gangbangers". Mandel called the suspension censorship.

In May 2021, multiple fundraisers left the Mandel campaign, citing a "toxic work atmosphere". The departed fundraisers alleged that they had been berated publicly by Mandel's girlfriend, who was the campaign's financial director.

In October 2021, posting on a far-right conservative website, Mandel claimed that Jewish financier George Soros and the "deep state" were responsible for the COVID-19 pandemic, the Black Lives Matter movement, antifa, and the January 6, 2021 assault on Capitol Hill.

In the May 2022 primary, Mandel was defeated by Trump-endorsed candidate JD Vance. Mandel came in second during the primary, receiving 23.9 percent of the votes.

== Political positions ==
=== Donald Trump ===
Mandel has been characterized as a Trump loyalist. He has backed Trump's widely disproven claims of voting fraud in the 2020 presidential election, and supported Trump's attempts to overturn opponent Joe Biden's electoral victory. Mandel has called Trump's second impeachment a "sham" and pledged to fight for the former president's "America First" agenda. Mandel claims that "studies that evidence widespread fraud" in relation to the 2020 presidential election will emerge eventually.

=== Abortion ===
Mandel is anti-abortion, but stated he does "support an exception to protect the life of the mother".

=== Health care ===
Mandel has called for the repeal of the Affordable Care Act. In a campaign advertisement during his 2012 Senatorial run, Mandel claimed opponent Sherrod Brown "cast the deciding vote on the government takeover of health care". PolitiFact has labeled as false the claim that Brown cast the deciding vote for the act. The description of the act as a government takeover of health care, by Mandel, has been labeled by PolitiFact as "nonsensical" and a "myth".

=== Environment ===
Mandel rejects the scientific consensus on climate change. He has referred to climate change research as "riddled with fraud". He has vowed to fight attempts to advance clean-air standards.

Mandel has called for what he terms as "aggressive and responsible" energy exploration that protects "the air we breathe and water we drink" while reducing environmental regulation. He supports the approval of the Keystone XL pipeline. Mandel is a supporter of expanded coal plants and has criticized what he has termed as "radical" environmental groups.

=== LGBT rights ===
Mandel opposes same-sex marriage, saying in 2012 that he will "protect the sanctity of marriage" and "this is a fight that I will never, ever back down". He is against openly gay people serving in the military, and voted against workplace and housing discrimination protections for gay and transgender people in 2009.

=== Foreign policy ===
In 2012, Mandel said that he disagreed with plans to set a "date certain" for withdrawal of U.S. military forces from Iraq and Afghanistan, also stating that "at some point in time, we have to take the training wheels off and we have to allow those countries to stand on their own two feet".

In early September 2021, when the U.S. evacuated Afghan allies from Afghanistan, Mandel said that refugees were being brought to "the heart of America ... To protect our kids, our communities and our Judeo-Christian way of life, we must FIGHT this with all our might."

=== Religion ===
In November 2021, Mandel, despite being Jewish, tweeted support for controversial statements by Michael Flynn calling for the establishment of "one religion" in the United States, which would be against the Establishment Clause of the First Amendment to the United States Constitution. He followed up with more tweets saying "Freedom of religion ≠ freedom FROM religion" and "America was not founded as a secular nation".

== Personal life ==
Mandel was married to social worker Ilana Shafran in August 2008 in Jerusalem. In April 2020, Mandel and Shafran filed for divorce. The divorce was finalized in June 2020 and all records were sealed until 2021 when details regarding finances, custody of their three children, and child support were released. Their divorce was re-opened in 2023 over disputes regarding child support, Mandel's failure to pay for the children's healthcare, and numerous other issues. Mandel and Shafran were both sentenced to 7 days in jail for contempt of court for violating the conditions of their 2020 divorce agreement. However, they were given the option to avoid jail time by resolving issues with a 529 college savings account and their children's sports and medical expenses.

In March 2025, Mandel married Alyssa Strayer in Ayrshire, Scotland. They currently reside in Pepper Pike, Ohio, with their five children.

== Electoral history ==
Election results
Year	Office	Election	Subject	Votes	%	Opponent	Votes	%	Opponent	Votes	%	Opponent	Votes	%	Opponent	Votes	%	Opponent	Votes	%
2012	U.S. Senate	GOP Primary	Josh Mandel	586,556	63.02	Michael Pryce	132,205	14.20	Donna Glisman	115,621	12.42	David Dodt	47,933	5.15	Eric Gregory	47,740	5.13	Russell Bliss	644	0.07
2022	U.S. Senate	GOP Primary	JD Vance	340,991	32.2	Josh Mandel	253,051	23.9	Matt Dolan	247,042	23.3	Mike Gibbons	123,417	11.7	Jane Timken	62,237	5.9	Mark Pukita	22,478	2.1

Election results
Year	Election	Subject	Party	Votes	%	Opponent	Party	Votes	%	Opponent	Party	Votes	%
2006	Ohio House of Representatives	Josh Mandel	Republican	36,729	67%	Roger J. Goudy	Democratic	18,047	33%				
2008	Ohio House of Representatives	Josh Mandel (incumbent)	Republican	48,280	72%	Bob Belovich	Democratic	19,119	28%				
2010	Ohio State Treasurer	Josh Mandel	Republican	2,050,142	55%	Kevin Boyce	Democratic	1,525,992	41%	Matthew Cantrell	Libertarian	184,478	5%
2012	U.S. Senator	Josh Mandel	Republican	2,435,744	45%	Sherrod Brown (incumbent)	Democratic	2,762,766	51%	Scott Rupert	Independent	250,617	4%
2014	Ohio State Treasurer	Josh Mandel (incumbent)	Republican	1,724,060	57%	Connie Pillich	Democratic	1,323,325	43%				

Ohio House of Representatives
Preceded by Jim Trakas	Member of the Ohio House of Representatives from the 17th district 2007–2011	Succeeded by Marlene Anielski
Political offices
Preceded by Kevin Boyce	Treasurer of Ohio; 2011–2019	Succeeded by Robert Sprague
Party political offices
Preceded by Sandra O'Brien	Republican nominee for Ohio State Treasurer; 2010, 2014	Succeeded by Robert Sprague
Party political offices
Preceded by Mike DeWine	Republican nominee for U.S. Senator from Ohio (Class 1); 2012	Succeeded by Jim Renacci
