= 2010 Ohio elections =

- 2010

The 2010 Ohio general elections were held on November 2, 2010. Primary elections took place on May 4, 2010. In the 2010 general election in Ohio, Republican candidates won all statewide executive offices, the U.S. Senate seat up for election, majorities in both state legislative chambers, and 13 out of 18 U.S. House seats.

== Federal representatives ==
=== United States Senate ===
In the Democratic primary on May 4, 2010, current Lieutenant Governor Lee Fisher defeated current Secretary of State Jennifer Brunner. On November 2, Republican Rob Portman, who has served in two federal cabinet positions and as a member of the U. S. House of Representatives defeated Fisher as well as Eric W. Deaton of the Constitution Party and Dan La Botz of the Socialist Party.

Portman replaced Republican Senator George Voinovich, who retired from office after his second term expired.

=== United States House of Representatives ===
All of Ohio's eighteen seats in the United States House of Representatives were up for election in 2010.

== State executive branch ==
=== Governor and Lieutenant Governor ===
Incumbent Democratic Governor Ted Strickland ran for reelection to a second term in office. His running mate was Yvette McGee Brown, the founding president of the Center for Child and Family Advocacy at Nationwide Children's Hospital, and former Judge of the Franklin County Court of Common Pleas.

John Kasich, former U.S. Representative and former Chair of the House Budget Committee, was the Republican nominee. His running mate was Ohio State Auditor Mary Taylor.

Ken Matesz was the Libertarian nominee. His running mate was Ann Leech.

Dennis Spisak was the Green nominee. His running mate was Anita Rios.

Kasich narrowly defeated Strickland with 49% of the vote.

=== Attorney General ===
In the Attorney General race, Democratic incumbent Richard Cordray was defeated by Republican Mike DeWine, a former two-term United States Senator from Ohio and member of the Senate Judiciary Committee as well as a former county prosecutor. DeWine would go on to defeat Cordray once again in the 2018 race for governor with running mate Jon Husted, the former Secretary of State.

=== Secretary of State ===
2010 Ohio Secretary of State election
- November 2, 2010
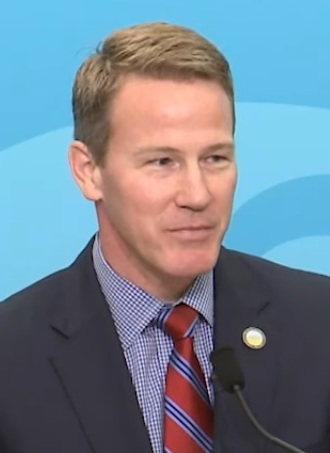

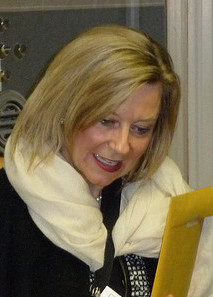
Nominee	Jon Husted	Maryellen O'Shaughnessy
Party	Republican	Democratic
Popular vote	2,013,674	1,555,705
Percentage	53.66%	41.46%
- County results Husted: 40-50% 50-60% 60-70% 70-80% O'Shaughnessy: 40-50% 50–60% 60–70%
Secretary of State before election
Jennifer Brunner
Democratic
Elected Secretary of State
Jon Husted
Republican

Ohio's Secretary of State race featured a contested Republican primary on May 4, 2010, between Jon Husted, an Ohio State Senator and former Speaker of the Ohio House of Representatives, who defeated Sandra O'Brien, a former county auditor in Ashtabula County who secured the support of the Tea Party movement. In the general election, Husted defeated Democrat Maryellen O'Shaughnessy, the Clerk of Franklin County Court of Common Pleas, and Charlie Earl, a Libertarian.

Incumbent Jennifer Brunner sought the Democratic nomination for United States Senator instead of running for re-election, but lost to incumbent Lt. Governor Lee Fisher.

Husted would later go on to run for Lieutenant Governor on Mike DeWine's ticket which defeated Richard Cordray in the 2018 election.

==== Polling ====
Poll source	Dates administered	Maryellen O'Shaughnessy (D)	Jon Husted (R)
The Columbus Dispatch	August 25 – September 3, 2010	39%	42%

==== Results ====
2010 Ohio Secretary of State election
Party	Candidate	Votes	%
Republican	Jon Husted	2,013,674	53.66
Democratic	Maryellen O'Shaughnessy	1,555,705	41.46
Libertarian	Charlie Earl	182,977	4.88
Total votes		3,752,356	100.00
Republican gain from Democratic			

=== Treasurer ===
Ohio State Treasurer election, 2010
- November 2, 2010
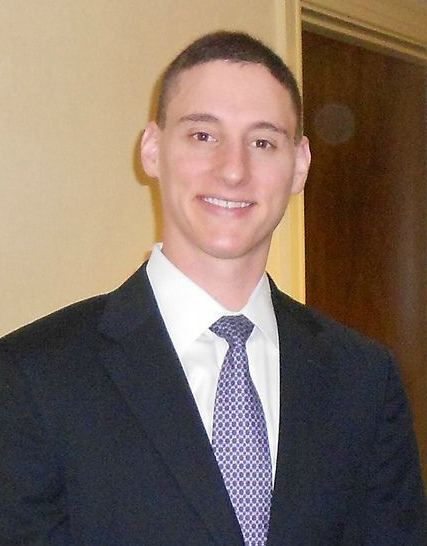

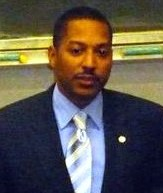
Nominee	Josh Mandel	Kevin Boyce
Party	Republican	Democratic
Popular vote	2,050,142	1,525,992
Percentage	54.52%	40.58%
- County results Mandel: 40-50% 50-60% 60-70% 70-80% Boyce: 40-50% 50–60% 60–70%
State Treasurer before election
Kevin Boyce
Democratic
Elected State Treasurer
Josh Mandel
Republican

In the Treasurer race, Democratic incumbent Kevin Boyce was defeated by Republican Josh Mandel, a member of the Ohio State House of Representatives and a two tour veteran of the Iraq War. Matthew Cantrell, a Libertarian candidate, received less than 5% of the vote.

==== Polling ====
Poll Source	Dates administered	Kevin Boyce (D)	Josh Mandel (R)
The Columbus Dispatch	August 25 – September 3, 2010	36%	40%

==== Results ====
2010 Ohio State Treasurer election
Party	Candidate	Votes	%
Republican	Josh Mandel	2,050,142	54.52
Democratic	Kevin Boyce (incumbent)	1,525,992	40.58
Libertarian	Matthew Cantrell	184,478	4.91
Total votes		3,760,612	100.00
Republican gain from Democratic			

=== Auditor ===
Ohio State Auditor election, 2010
- November 2, 2010
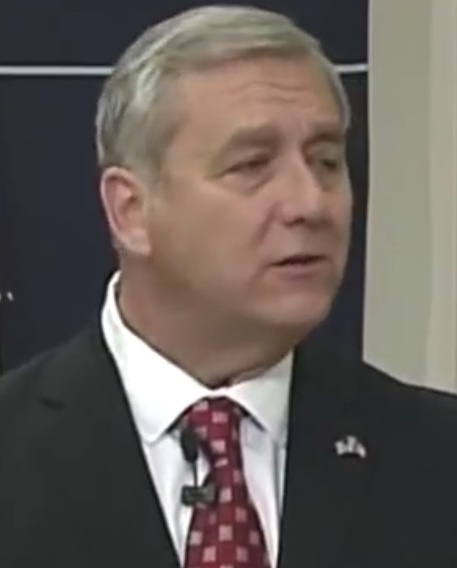

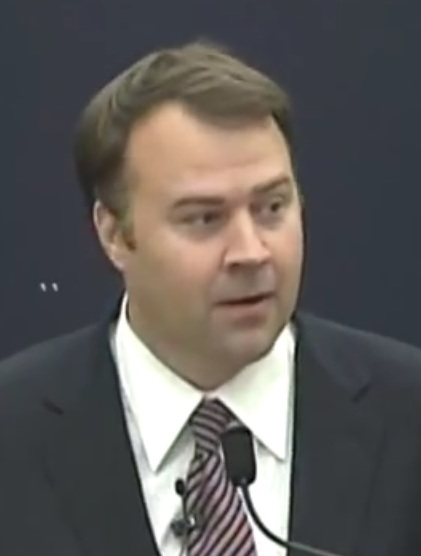
Nominee	Dave Yost	David Pepper
Party	Republican	Democratic
Popular vote	1,882,010	1,683,330
Percentage	50.22%	44.91%
- County results Yost: 40-50% 50-60% 60-70% 70-80% Pepper: 40-50% 50–60% 60–70%
State Auditor before election
Mary Taylor
Republican
Elected State Auditor
Dave Yost
Republican

Ohio's Auditor race also featured a contested Republican primary on May 4, 2010, between Seth Morgan, a member of the Ohio House of Representatives, and Dave Yost, the Prosecuting Attorney for Delaware County, Ohio and former Delaware County Auditor. Yost beat Democrat David A. Pepper, a Commissioner for the Hamilton County, Ohio Board of Commissioners, and L. Michael Howard, a Libertarian.

Republican incumbent Mary Taylor decided to run for Lieutenant Governor as John Kasich's running-mate, instead of running for re-election.

==== Polling ====
Poll source	Dates administered	David Pepper (D)	Dave Yost (R)
The Columbus Dispatch	August 25 – September 3, 2010	33%	42%

==== Results ====
2010 Ohio State Auditor election
Party	Candidate	Votes	%
Republican	Dave Yost	1,882,010	50.22
Democratic	David Pepper	1,683,330	44.91
Libertarian	L. Michael Howard	182,534	4.87
Total votes		3,747,874	100.00
Republican hold			

== State legislative branch ==
=== State Senate ===
The 17 odd-numbered districts out of 33 seats in the Ohio Senate were up for election in 2010.

=== State House of Representatives ===
All 99 seats in the Ohio House of Representatives were up for election in 2010.

== State judicial branch ==
Three seats in the Supreme Court of Ohio are up for election, including the office of Chief Justice. The Supreme Court is a non-partisan office and will not appear on primary ballots. Although the Democratic and Republic parties customarily endorse candidates in the general election, those endorsements are not noted on the general election ballots either. Justices Judith Lanziger and Paul Peiffer are running for re-election. Justice Maureen O'Connor is running for Chief Justice. Judges for Ohio District Courts of Appeal and Ohio Courts of Common Pleas will also appear on the ballot.

=== Chief Justice ===
Poll source	Dates administered	Eric Brown (D)	Maureen O'Connor (R)	Undecided
The Columbus Dispatch	August 25 – September 3, 2010	18%	46%	36%

=== Associate Justice ===
Poll source	Dates administered	Mary Jane Trapp (D)	Judith Ann Lanzinger (R)	Undecided
The Columbus Dispatch	August 25 – September 3, 2010	18%	19%	62%

== Ballot initiatives ==
Two measures were approved in the May 4 election. No ballot measures were approved for the general election.
