= Socialist Party of Ohio =

- Ideology: Democratic socialism
- Political position: Left-wing
- National affiliation: Socialist Party USA
- Colors: Red

Website
- https://www.spohio.org/

The Socialist Party of Ohio (SPOH) is a socialist political party in the U.S. state of Ohio. Founded in 1901, the SPO was an affiliate of the Socialist Party of America. Since the 1972 renaming of the SPA to Social Democrats, USA, it has been the state chapter of the Socialist Party USA (SPUSA). Currently, it is not chartered and is an at-large organizing area of SPUSA.

== Socialist Party of America ==
The Socialist Party of Ohio was founded in 1901 and inherited a tradition of independent labor political organization. It grew modestly from its establishment until the Panic of 1907 and then again during the years immediately before World War I.

== 2010 campaign for the U.S. Senate ==
The Socialist Party of Ohio qualified for ballot access in the United States Senate election in Ohio, 2010. SPOH candidate Dan La Botz received 25 368 votes (0.68%); the Republican winner Rob Portman received 2.125 million votes (57.25%) and the Democratic candidate Lee Fisher received 1.448 million votes (39.00%).

United States Senate election in Ohio, 2010
Party	Candidate	Votes	%	±%
Republican	Rob Portman	2,125,810	57.25%	−6.61%
Democratic	Lee Fisher	1,448,092	39.00%	+2.85%
Constitution	Eric Deaton	64,017	1.72%	N/A
Independent	Michael Pryce	48,653	1.31%	N/A
Socialist	Daniel La Botz	25,368	0.68%	N/A
N/A	Arthur Sullivan (write-in)	1,512	0.04%	N/A
Majority		677,718	18.25%	
Total votes		3,713,452	100.0	
Republican hold		Swing		

== International Socialist Review gallery ==
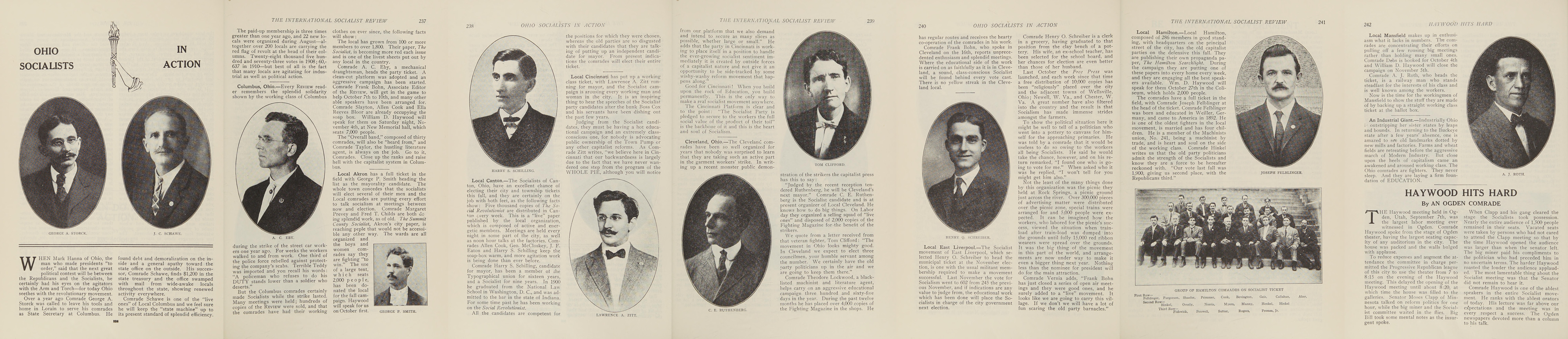
"Ohio Socialists In Action" October 1911

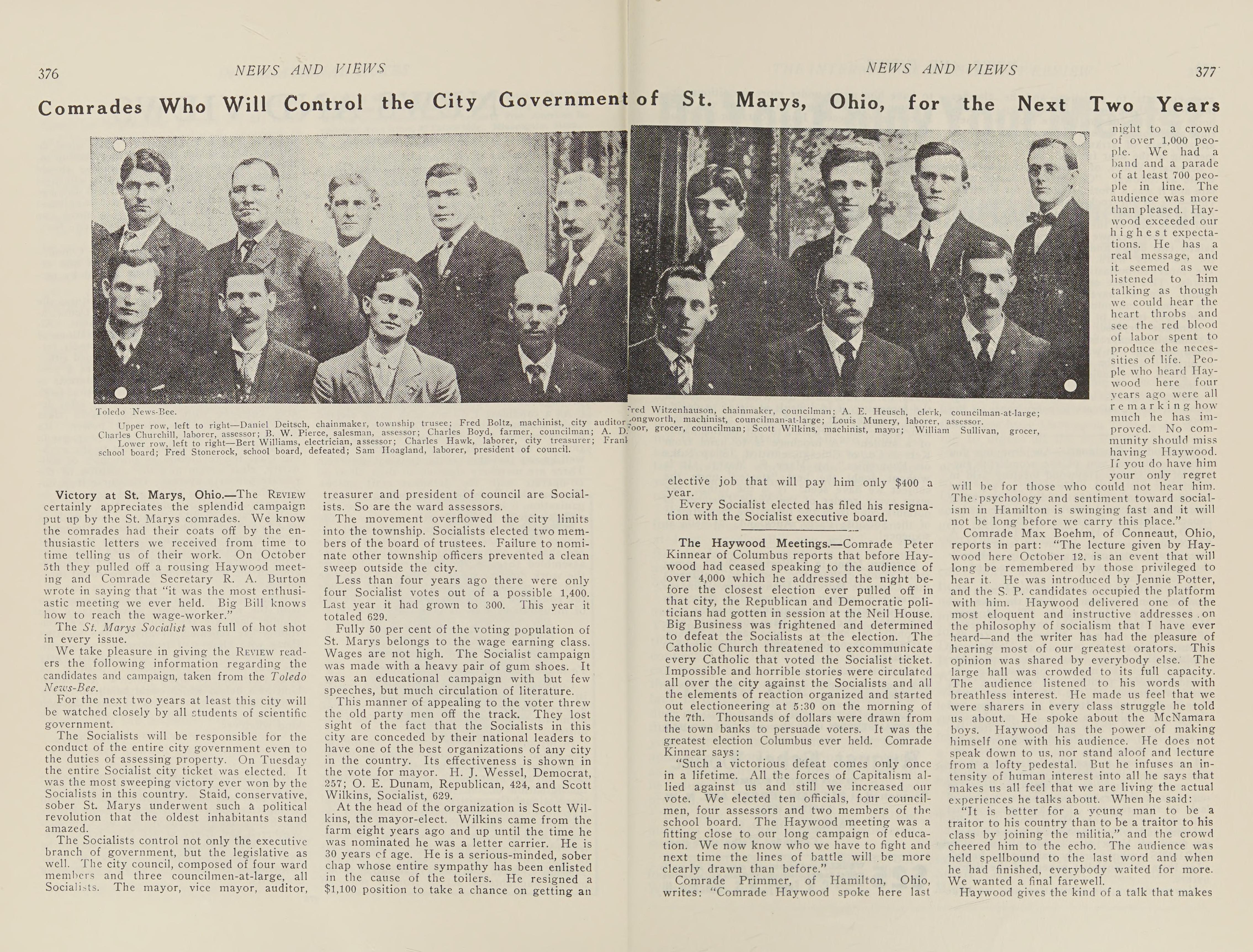
"Comrades Who Will Control the City Government of St. Marys, Ohio, for the Next Two Years" December 1911
