= Dan La Botz =

American labor union activist, academic, journalist, and author

Personal details
- Born: August 9, 1945 (age 81) Chicago, Illinois.
- Party: Socialist Party USA
- Other political affiliations: Democratic Socialists of America
- Spouse: Sherry Baron
- Children: 3, including Jake La Botz
- Education: Southwestern College; University of California, San Diego; University of Cincinnati
- Profession: Teacher, Historian, Journalist, Truck driver

Daniel H. La Botz (born August 9, 1945) is an American labor union activist, academic, journalist, and author. He was a co-founder of Teamsters for a Democratic Union (TDU) and has written extensively on worker rights in the United States and Mexico. He is a member of the socialist organization Solidarity, which describes itself as "a democratic, revolutionary socialist, feminist, anti-racist organization," which comes out of the Trotskyist tradition. La Botz ran in 2010 for a seat in the United States Senate for the Socialist Party. He is also a member of the Brooklyn branch of the Democratic Socialists of America and a co-editor of the socialist journal New Politics.

== Early life and career ==
La Botz was born in Illinois but grew up outside San Diego, California. He attended Southwestern College and the University of California, San Diego. When he was in college, he opposed the American involvement in the Vietnam War and supported the United Farm Workers. He is a leader of the socialist organization Solidarity, which describes itself as "a democratic, revolutionary socialist, feminist, anti-racist organization" and which comes out of the Trotskyist tradition. In the 1970s, La Botz worked various jobs in Chicago before working as a truck driver. Within the International Brotherhood of Teamsters (IBT), he was a co-founder of the Teamsters for a Democratic Union (TDU), a reform caucus partially maintained by members of Solidarity. TDU began in 1975 when a small group of freight Teamsters, some from the International Socialists (IS) group in Berkeley, CA met in Chicago, Illinois and founded Teamsters for a Decent Contract (TDC). The IS later merged with other organizations from Trotskyist traditions to form Solidarity.

La Botz subsequently worked as a community and union organizer and later a journalist. La Botz worked in the 1980s as a journalist in Chicago and Mexico City and as an author on topics of workers' struggles and unions in the United States and Mexico. He earned a PhD in American history at the University of Cincinnati in 1998. He later became assistant professor of history and Latin American studies at the Miami University, the University of Cincinnati and the Northern Kentucky University. La Botz is an editor of Mexican Labor News and Analysis (MLNA). In May 2010, La Botz was working as a Spanish teacher at Waldorf elementary school in Cincinnati.

== Senatorial campaign ==
Dan La Botz
- Campaign: U.S. senate election in Ohio, 2010
- Candidate: Dan La Botz
- Affiliation: Socialist Party of Ohio
- Status: Lost

On February 19, 2010, La Botz announced that he was running for the United States Senate in Ohio on the Ohio Socialist Party ballot. He subsequently gathered 1,200 signatures to gain ballot access. La Botz was the only Ohio candidate running on the ticket of the Socialist Party USA.

In the United States Senate election in Ohio, 2010, SPOH candidate La Botz received 25 thousand votes (0.68%); the Republican winner Rob Portman received 2.125 million votes (57.25%) and the Democratic candidate Lee Fisher received 1.448 million votes (39.00%).

United States Senate election in Ohio, 2010
Party	Candidate	Votes	%	±%
Republican	Rob Portman	2,125,810	57.25%	−6.61%
Democratic	Lee Fisher	1,448,092	39.00%	+2.85%
Constitution	Eric Deaton	64,017	1.72%	N/A
Independent	Michael Pryce	48,653	1.31%	N/A
Socialist	Daniel LaBotz	25,368	0.68%	N/A
N/A	Arthur Sullivan (write-in)	1,512	0.04%	N/A
Majority		677,718	18.25%	
Total votes		3,713,452	100.0	
Republican hold		Swing		

== Published works ==
=== Books ===
- The Crisis of Mexican Labor. University of Texas: Praeger Publishers. 1988. p. 206. ISBN 0-275-92600-1.
- Rank and File Rebellion: Teamsters for a Democratic Union. University of Michigan: Verso Books. 1990. p. 336. ISBN 0-86091-505-0.
- Edward L. Doheny: Petroleum, Power and Politics in the U.S. and Mexico. Praeger Publishers. 1991. p. 202. ISBN 0-275-93599-X.
- A Troublemakers' Handbook: How to Fight Back Where You Work and Win!. Labor Notes. 1991. p. 262. ISBN 0-914093-04-5.
- Mask of Democracy: Labor Suppression in Mexico Today. South End Press. 1992. p. 223. ISBN 0-89608-437-X.
- Democracy in Mexico: Peasant Rebellion and Political Reform. South End Press. 1995. p. 274. ISBN 0-89608-507-4.
- Made in Indonesia: Indonesian Workers Since Suharto. South End Press. 2001. p. 395. ISBN 0-89608-642-9.
- Cesar Chavez and La Causa. Pearson Longman. 2006. p. 210. ISBN 0-321-18764-4.
- What Went Wrong? The Nicaraguan Revolution--A Marxist Analysis. Brill. 2016. p. 407. ISBN 978-9004291300.

=== Pamphlets ===
- La Botz, Dan; Clement, Chris; Luce, Stephanie; Post, Charlie (2000). Beating back the corporate attack: Socialism and the struggle for social justice. A Solidarity pamphlet. Detroit MI: Solidarity.
- La Botz, Dan (1997). The fight at UPS: The Teamsters victory and the "new labor movement". A Solidarity pamphlet. Detroit MI: Solidarity.
- La Botz, Dan (May 17, 2009). Obama, the crisis, and the movements. Working paper. Detroit MI: Solidarity.
