= 2010 United States Senate election in Ohio =

- November 2, 2010
- Turnout: 49.22% (registered voters) ▼22.55pp
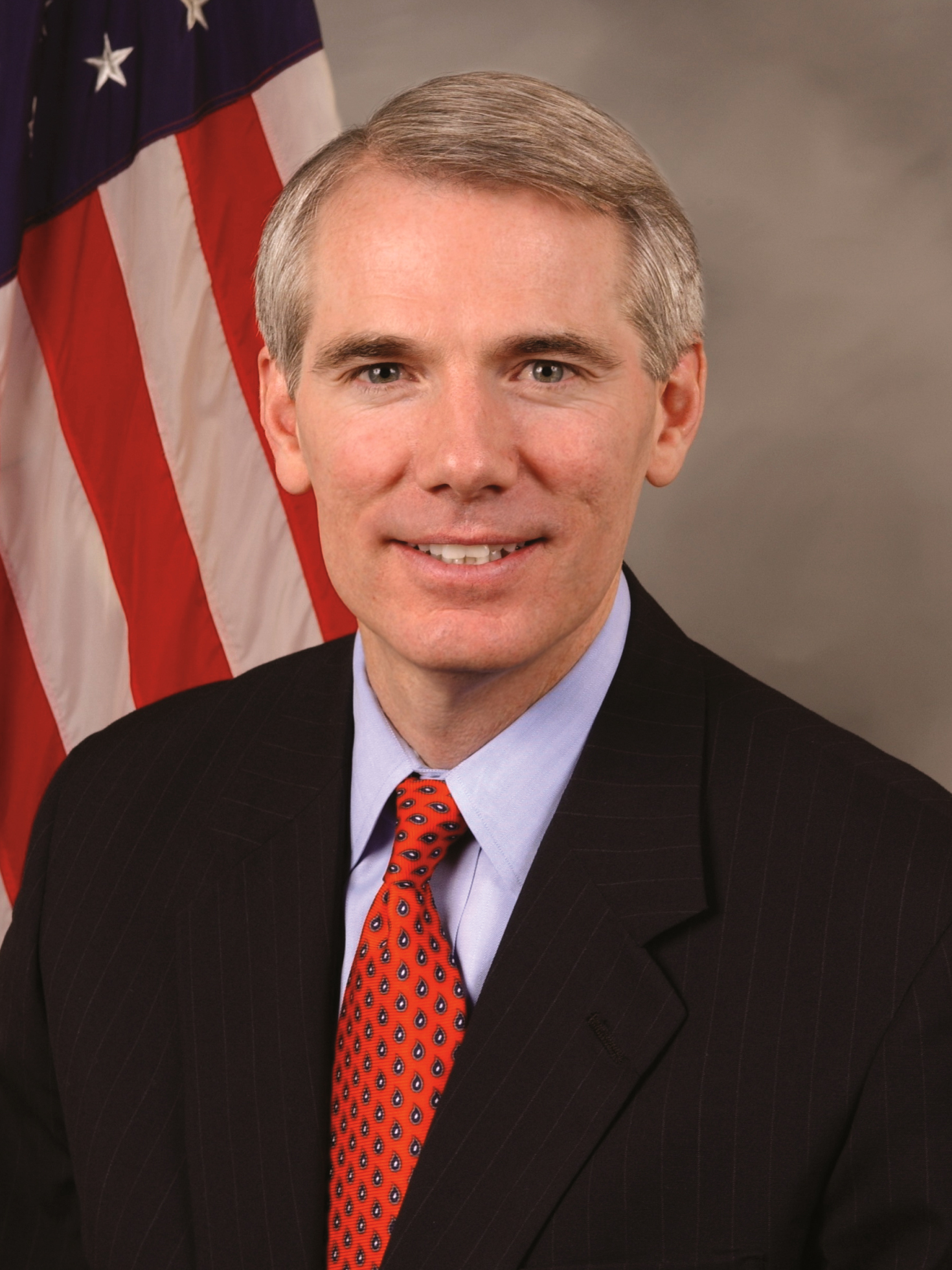

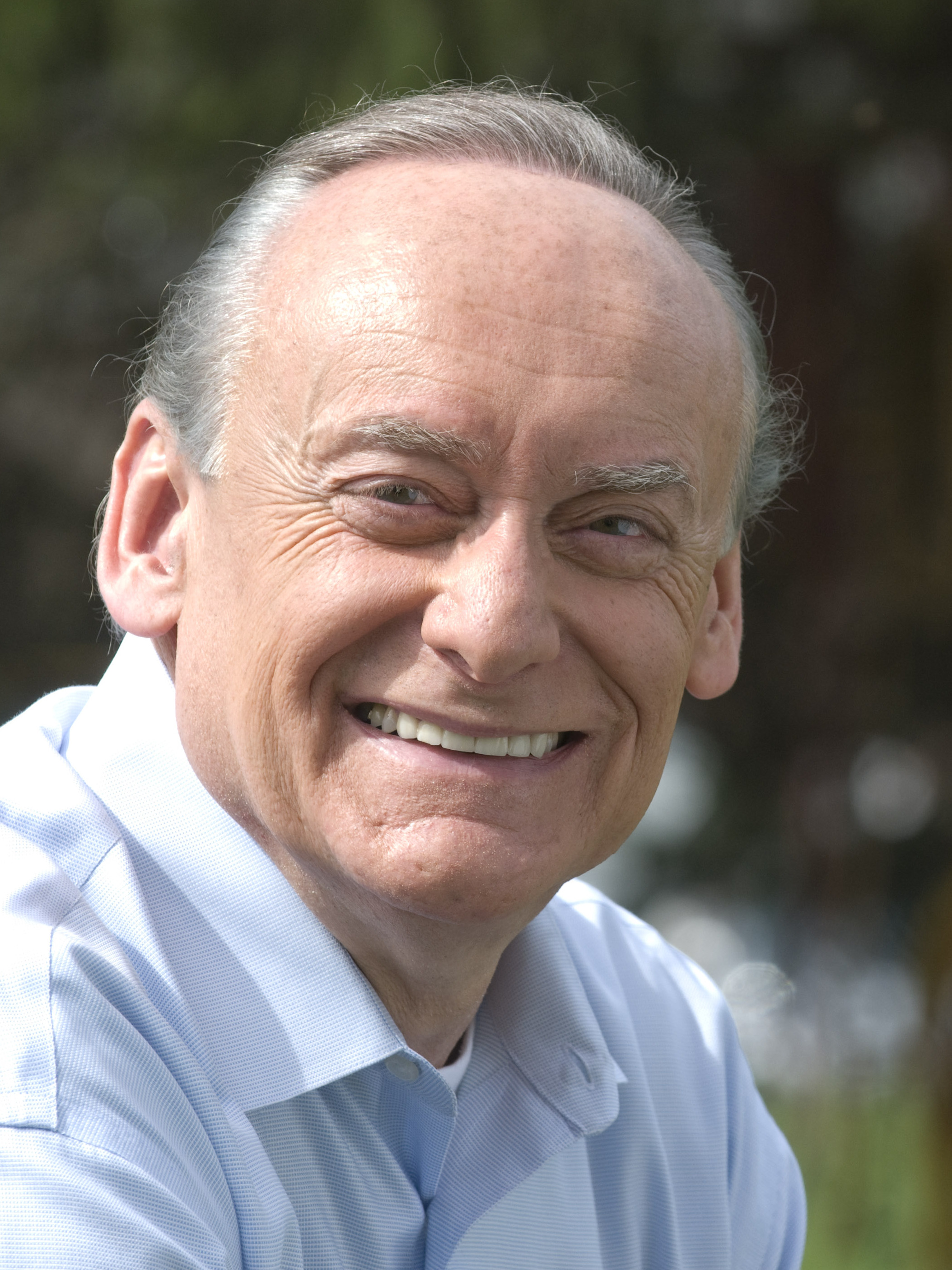
Nominee	Rob Portman	Lee Fisher
Party	Republican	Democratic
Popular vote	2,168,742	1,503,297
Percentage	56.85%	39.40%
- Portman: 40–50% 50–60% 60–70% 70–80% Fisher: 40–50% 50–60% 70–80%
U.S. senator before election
George Voinovich
Republican
Elected U.S. Senator
Rob Portman
Republican

The 2010 United States Senate election in Ohio was held on November 2, 2010, as one of many Ohio elections in 2010. Incumbent two-term Republican U.S. Senator George Voinovich decided to retire instead of seeking a third term. Former Representative Republican Rob Portman won the open seat.

This was one of the five Republican-held Senate seats up for election in a state that Barack Obama won in the 2008 presidential election.

== Republican primary ==
=== Background ===
With rumors circulating about Voinovich's possible retirement, former Director of the Office of Management and Budget, United States Trade Representative, and Congressman Rob Portman and State Auditor Mary Taylor were considered the main contenders for the Republican nomination. Former Ohio Secretary of State Ken Blackwell was also considered a potential candidate, but declined in order to run for chairman of the Republican National Committee.

=== Candidate ===
- Rob Portman, former director of the Office of Management and Budget (2006–2007), former United States trade representative (2005–2006) and former U.S. representative of Ohio's 2nd congressional district (1993–2005)

=== Campaign ===
After Voinovich made his retirement official, Portman declared his candidacy the next day. Thomas Ganley, a Cleveland car dealer, launched his campaign for the nomination in April, after Portman had collected support from most of the Ohio Republican establishment. Taylor officially declined to run in May and was announced as gubernatorial candidate John Kasich's running mate on January 12, 2010.

Ganley was the only other declared candidate, but on February 17, 2010, he announced that he would switch races and run against Betty Sutton in Ohio's 13th congressional district instead, leaving Portman as the only Republican candidate. He had over $7 million in campaign funds.

=== Results ===
Republican primary results
Party	Candidate	Votes	%
Republican	Rob Portman	667,369	100.00%
Total votes		667,369	100.00%

== Democratic primary ==
=== Background ===
Congressman Tim Ryan, Secretary of State Jennifer Brunner, and Lieutenant Governor Lee Fisher were considered leading contenders to run against George Voinovich. Ohio Governor Ted Strickland urged Jennifer Brunner to run for re-election rather than run for the Senate. Cuyahoga County Commissioner Peter Lawson Jones and Ohio State Representative Tyrone Yates considered running, but both withdrew from consideration.

=== Candidates ===
- Jennifer Brunner, secretary of state (2007–2011)
- Lee Fisher, lieutenant governor of Ohio (2007–2011), former attorney general of Ohio (1991–1995) and nominee for governor in 1998

=== Campaign ===
On February 17, 2009, Brunner and Fisher both officially announced their candidacies for the now-open seat election, with Strickland officially endorsing Fisher. Ryan declined to run and endorsed Fisher in July.

Fisher was endorsed by Governor Ted Strickland and U.S. Representatives John Boccieri, Tim Ryan, Zack Space, and Charlie Wilson.

Polling in late 2009 and January 2010 showed Brunner to be more competitive than Fisher in a general election matchup against Portman, while Fisher and Brunner were deadlocked in Democratic primary polling.

Charlene Renee Bradley and Traci Johnson also filed to run in the Democratic primary.

=== Polling ===
Poll source	Date(s) administered	Sample size	Margin of error	Jennifer Brunner	Lee Fisher	Other	Undecided
Quinnipiac University	January 29 – February 2, 2009	492	± 4.4%	16%	18%	14%	53%
Quinnipiac University	March 10–15, 2009	506	± 4.4%	14%	18%	1%	46%
Quinnipiac University	April 28 – May 4, 2009	437	± 4.7%	16%	20%	1%	59%
Quinnipiac University	June 26 – July 1, 2009	483	± 4.5%	21%	24%	2%	51%
Research 2000	July 6–8, 2009	400	± 5.0%	17%	22%	—	61%
Quinnipiac University	September 10–13, 2009	421	± 4.8%	17%	26%	2%	55%
Quinnipiac University	November 5–9, 2009	394	± 4.9%	22%	24%	1%	51%
Quinnipiac University	February 16–21, 2010	604	± 4.0%	20%	29%	2%	48%
Quinnipiac University	March 25–28, 2010	978	± 3.1%	26%	33%	1%	40%
Research 2000	April 5–7, 2010	400	± 4.0%	26%	35%	—	39%
Quinnipiac University	April 22–26, 2010	987	± 3.1%	24%	41%	1%	34%
Suffolk University	April 27–29, 2010	400	± 4.9%	27%	55%	—	18%
Quinnipiac University	April 29 – May 2, 2010	980	± 3.1%	23%	43%	1%	32%

=== Results ===
Results by county Fisher 50–60% 60–70% Brunner 50–60% 60–70%

Democratic primary results
Party	Candidate	Votes	%
Democratic	Lee Fisher	380,189	55.6%
Democratic	Jennifer Brunner	304,026	44.4%
Total votes		684,206	100.0%

== General election ==
=== Candidates ===
- Eric Deaton (Constitution Party)
- Lee Fisher (D), lieutenant governor, former Ohio attorney general, former state senator, and former state representative
- Dan La Botz (Socialist Party), labor union activist, academic, journalist, and author
- Rob Portman (R), former U.S. congressman and cabinet member for George W. Bush
- Michael Pryce (Independent)

=== Campaign ===
When the incumbent announced he would retire, Portman jumped into the race in early 2009. During the two-year time period, Portman raised over $9 million. Originally, the election was seen as a toss-up, as Portman's experience in the Bush administration was considered a liability for him. Both President Barack Obama and Vice President Joe Biden campaigned for Fisher. However, Portman consistently led in fundraising and polling, particularly as Portman was unopposed in the Republican primary, while the Democratic primary between Fisher and Brunner was highly divisive.

Television advertisements were very negative. Fisher attacked Portman for helping to ship jobs overseas during his entire political career, backing deals that shipped jobs overseas, and the trade deficit with China, which grew by over $41 billion. Portman claimed in response that most jobs were being lost to other states, not other countries. Portman attacked Fisher for supporting Obama's stimulus and cap and trade.

=== Debates ===
Three debates were held in Cleveland, Columbus, and Toledo. The first one was in Toledo on October 5. The second one was in Cleveland on October 8, while the third was in Columbus on October 12.

=== Predictions ===
Source	Ranking	As of
Cook Political Report	Solid R	October 26, 2010
Rothenberg	Safe R	October 22, 2010
RealClearPolitics	Safe R	October 26, 2010
Sabato's Crystal Ball	Likely R	October 21, 2010
CQ Politics	Safe R	October 26, 2010

=== Polling ===
Poll source	Date(s) administered	Sample size	Margin of error	Lee Fisher (D)	Rob Portman (R)	Other	Undecided
Public Policy Polling (report)	January 17–18, 2009	578	± 4.1%	39%	41%	—	20%
Quinnipiac University (report)	January 29 – February 2, 2009	1,127	± 2.9%	42%	27%	1%	29%
Quinnipiac University (report)	March 10–15, 2009	1,299	± 2.7%	41%	33%	1%	24%
Quinnipiac University (report)	April 28 – May 4, 2009	1,079	± 3.0%	42%	31%	1%	26%
Public Policy Polling (report)	June 17–19, 2009	619	± 3.9%	41%	32%	—	27%
Quinnipiac University (report)	June 26 – July 1, 2009	1,259	± 2.8%	37%	33%	2%	26%
Research 2000 (report)	July 6–8, 2009	400	± 5.0%	42%	35%	—	23%
Quinnipiac University (report)	September 10–13, 2009	1,074	± 3.0%	42%	31%	1%	26%
Rasmussen Reports (report)	September 23, 2009	500	± 4.5%	40%	41%	6%	14%
Quinnipiac University (report)	November 5–9, 2009	1,123	± 2.9%	36%	39%	—	24%
Rasmussen Reports (report)	December 7, 2009	500	± 4.5%	36%	38%	8%	18%
Rasmussen Reports (report)	January 12, 2010	500	± 4.5%	37%	44%	4%	14%
Rasmussen Reports (report)	February 5–6, 2010	500	± 4.5%	39%	43%	5%	13%
Quinnipiac University (report)	February 16–21, 2010	1,662	± 2.4%	37%	40%	2%	21%
Rasmussen Reports (report)	March 4, 2010	500	± 4.5%	39%	44%	5%	12%
Public Policy Polling (report)	March 20–21, 2010	630	± 3.9%	36%	41%	—	23%
Quinnipiac (report)	March 23–29, 2010	1,526	± 2.5%	41%	37%	1%	21%
Rasmussen Reports (report)	March 30, 2010	500	± 4.5%	38%	43%	4%	14%
Research 2000 (report)	April 5–7, 2010	600	± 4.0%	43%	39%	—	18%
Quinnipiac Polling (report)	April 21–26, 2010	1,568	± 2.5%	40%	37%	1%	21%
Rasmussen Reports (report)	May 7, 2010	500	± 4.5%	43%	42%	4%	14%
UC/The Ohio Poll (report)	May 11–20, 2010	668	± 3.8%	47%	46%	—	6%
Rasmussen Reports (report)	June 3, 2010	500	± 4.5%	43%	43%	4%	10%
Quinnipiac Polling (report)	June 22–27, 2010	1,107	± 3.0%	42%	40%	1%	17%
Public Policy Polling (report)	June 26–27, 2010	482	± 4.5%	40%	38%	––	22%
Rasmussen Reports (report)	June 29, 2010	500	± 4.5%	39%	43%	4%	13%
Rasmussen Reports (report)	July 19, 2010	750	± 4.0%	39%	45%	5%	11%
Rasmussen Reports (report)	August 2, 2010	750	± 4.0%	40%	44%	5%	11%
Reuters/Ipsos (report)	August 6–8, 2010	600	± 4.0%	36%	43%	—	21%
Rasmussen Reports (report)	August 16, 2010	750	± 4.0%	37%	45%	5%	13%
Public Policy Polling (report)	August 27–29, 2010	475	± 4.5%	38%	45%	—	18%
Rasmussen Reports (report)	August 30, 2010	750	± 4.0%	39%	44%	7%	11%
The Columbus Dispatch (report)	August 25 – September 3, 2010	1,622	± 2.2%	37%	50%	3%	9%
Fox News/Pulse Opinion Research (report)	September 11, 2010	1,000	± 3.0%	41%	48%	3%	8%
Rasmussen Reports (report)	September 13, 2010	750	± 4.0%	41%	49%	2%	8%
CNN/Time Magazine (report)	September 10–14, 2010	820	± 3.5%	41%	52%	4%	2%
SurveyUSA (report)	September 14, 2010	1000	± 4.0%	40%	49%	7%	4%
Quinnipiac University (report)	September 17, 2010	730	± 3.6%	35%	55%	—	1%
Ohio Newspapers Poll/UC (report)	September 24, 2010	850	± 4.0%	40%	55%	—	5%
Fox News/Pulse Opinion Research (report)	September 25, 2010	1,000	± 3.0%	37%	50%	3%	11%
CBS/NY Times report)	September 23–27, 2010	941	± 3.0%	34%	45%	—	18%
Reuters/Ipsos report)	September 23–25, 2010	440	± 3.0%	37%	50%	—	13%
Rasmussen Reports (report)	September 27, 2010	500	± 4.5%	42%	51%	1%	6%
Fox News/Pulse Opinion Research (report)	October 2, 2010	1,000	± 3.0%	37%	53%	2%	8%
Quinnipiac University (report)	September 29 – October 3, 2010	1,025	± 3.1%	36%	55%	—	—
Angus Reid Public Opinion (report)	Oct. 5–8, 2010	500	± 4.5%	43%	52%	6%	—
Rasmussen Reports (report)	October 11, 2010	750	± 4.0%	34%	57%	2%	7%
University of Cincinnati (report)	October 8–13, 2010	705	± 3.7%	36%	58%	1%	6%
Quinnipiac University (report)	October 12–17, 2010	1,183	± 2.8%	34%	55%	1%	10%
University of Cincinnati (report)	October 14–18, 2010	839	± 3.3%	39%	58%	0%	3%
CNN/Time/Opinion Research (report)	October 15–19, 2010	1,502	± 2.5%	40%	55%	2%	3%
Quinnipiac University (report)	October 20, 2010	686	± 2.5%	34%	55%	—	2%
Wilson Research Strategies (report)	October 20–21, 2010	500	± 3.0%	38%	49%	—	8%
SurveyUSA (report)	October 22–26, 2010	950	± 4.0%	37%	52%	—	4%
Rasmussen Reports (report)	October 26, 2010	750	± 4.0%	33%	57%	3%	7%
Columbus Dispatch (report)	October 20–29, 2010	1,445	± 2.3%	40%	56%	0%	4%
Quinnipiac University (report)	October 25–30, 2010	848	± 3.4%	37%	56%	1%	8%
Angus Reid Public Opinion (report)	October 27–29, 2010	460	± 4.6%	40%	57%	3%	—
Public Policy Polling (report)	October 28–30, 2010	1,356	± 2.7%	39%	57%	0%	4%
University of Cincinnati (report)	October 27–31, 2010	930	± 3.2%	39%	60%	0%	1%
University of Cincinnati (report)	November 1, 2010	930	± 3.2%	39%	61%	0%	0%

=== Fundraising ===
Candidate (party)	Receipts	Disbursements	Cash on hand	Debt
Rob Portman (R)	$15,998,398	$10,493,211	$5,505,186	$0
Lee Fisher (D)	$6,191,361	$5,882,729	$308,631	$0
Source: Federal Election Commission

=== Results ===
Winning the election, Portman received 57% of the votes. He received the majority of votes in 82 of 88 counties and in 15 of 18 Congressional districts, including the district of liberal U.S. Congressman Dennis Kucinich.

United States Senate election in Ohio, 2010
Party	Candidate	Votes	%	±%
Republican	Robert Jones Portman	2,168,742	56.85%	−6.61%
Democratic	Lee Irwin Fisher	1,503,297	39.40%	+2.85%
Constitution	Eric Deaton	65,856	1.72%	N/A
Independent	Michael Pryce	50,101	1.31%	N/A
Socialist	Daniel LaBotz	26,454	0.69%	N/A
N/A	Arthur Sullivan (write-in)	648	0.02%	N/A
Majority		665,445	17.44%	
Total votes		3,815,098	100.00%	
Republican hold		Swing	NA	

==== Counties that flipped from Republican to Democratic ====
- Monroe (largest city: Woodsfield)
- Cuyahoga (largest city: Cleveland)
- Lucas (largest city: Toledo)
- Mahoning (largest city: Youngstown)
- Trumbull (largest city: Warren)
- Athens (largest city: Athens)

== See also ==
- Ohio elections, 2010
- United States House of Representatives elections in Ohio, 2010
