= Lee Fisher =

American lawyer, academic, public servant and charity officer

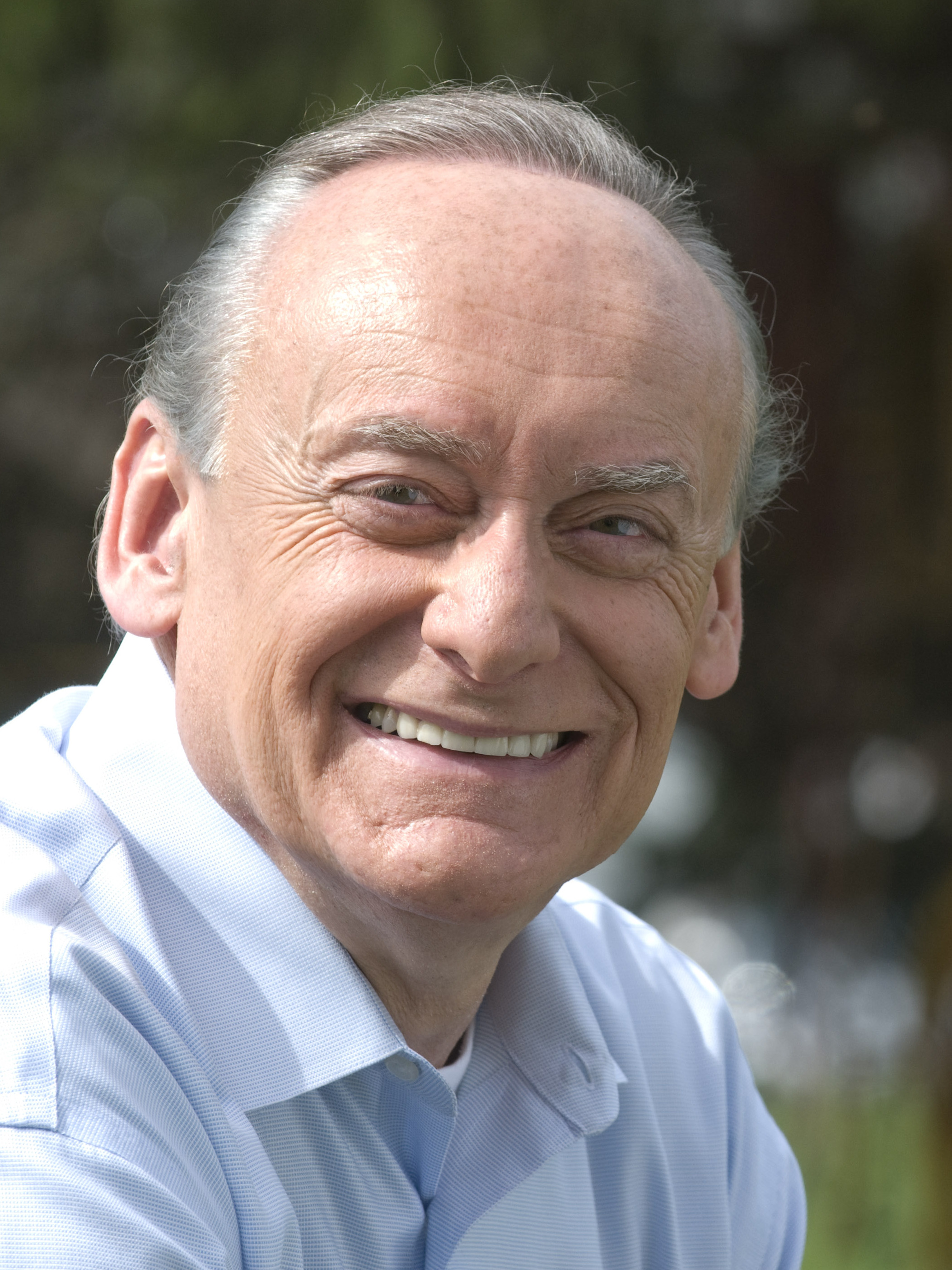
- Fisher in 2010

10th President of Baldwin Wallace University
- Incumbent
- Assumed office July 1, 2025
- Preceded by: Robert C. Helmer

64th Lieutenant Governor of Ohio
- In office January 8, 2007 – January 10, 2011
- Governor: Ted Strickland
- Preceded by: Bruce Johnson
- Succeeded by: Mary Taylor

44th Attorney General of Ohio
- In office January 14, 1991 – January 9, 1995
- Governor: George Voinovich
- Preceded by: Tony Celebrezze
- Succeeded by: Betty Montgomery

Member of the Ohio Senate from the 25th district
- In office January 3, 1983 – December 31, 1990
- Preceded by: Paul Matia
- Succeeded by: Eric Fingerhut

Member of the Ohio House of Representatives from the 16th district
- In office January 3, 1981 – December 31, 1982
- Preceded by: Harry Lehman
- Succeeded by: Judy Sheerer

Personal details
- Born: Lee Irwin Fisher; August 7, 1951 (age 74) Ann Arbor, Michigan, U.S.
- Party: Democratic
- Spouse: Peggy Zone
- Children: 2
- Education: Oberlin College (BA); Case Western Reserve University (JD, MA)

Lee Irwin Fisher (born August 7, 1951) is an American attorney, politician, and academic. A member of the Democratic Party, he served as the 64th lieutenant governor of Ohio under governor Ted Strickland from 2007 until 2011. Fisher previously served as the 44th attorney general of Ohio from 1991 to 1995, and as a member of the Ohio General Assembly from 1981 to 1990.

Fisher was the Democratic nominee in the 1998 Ohio gubernatorial election and 2010 United States Senate election in Ohio. After his political career, Fisher served as the dean of Cleveland State University College of Law from 2016 to 2025, and as president of Baldwin Wallace University since 2025.

== Early life and education ==
Fisher graduated from Oberlin College in 1973 and earned a Juris Doctor from the Case Western Reserve University School of Law in 1976. He graduated from the Weatherhead School of Management Professional Fellows Program in 1996. In 2004, he received his master's degree in nonprofit organization from the Case Western Reserve University Mandel Center for Nonprofit Organizations.

== Career ==
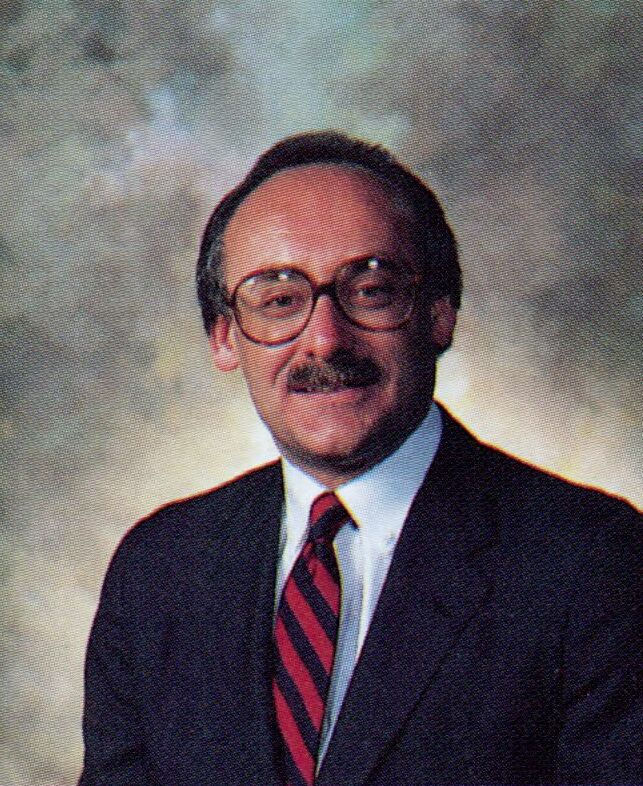
Fisher during his tenure as a state senator

After graduation from law school, Fisher was a law clerk for Judge Paul C. Weick of the U.S. Court of Appeals for the Sixth Circuit from 1976 to 1977. In 1978, was an instructor in legal research, writing, and advocacy at Cleveland-Marshall College of Law and joined the Cleveland law firm of Hahn Loeser & Parks LLP. Fisher remained as of counsel to the law firm until his 1990 election as Ohio Attorney General; he rejoined as a partner in 1995 and remained until he was selected CEO of the Center for Families and Children in 1999.

At the age of 29, Fisher was elected to the Ohio House of Representatives in 1980. He served as a state representative for two years before being elected to the Ohio Senate in 1982. He was named " Outstanding Freshman Legislator" by Columbus Monthly magazine in 1982. In 1983 he was named a Chase Public Leadership Fellow and attended the Harvard Program for Senior Executives in State and Local Government.

Fisher was elected Attorney General of Ohio in 1990, defeating Paul Pfeifer in the only statewide election in Ohio history to trigger a statewide recount. In 1992, Fisher was elected a presidential elector for Ohio. Fisher served as attorney general from 1991 to 1995, narrowly losing his bid for re-election in 1994 to Republican Betty Montgomery. In 1998, Fisher ran for governor but lost to Republican Bob Taft, 50%–45%.

Joining the ticket of Democratic gubernatorial candidate Ted Strickland, Fisher was elected lieutenant governor in 2006. The Ohio gubernatorial campaign was captured in the 2008 documentary film Swing State, which was directed by (his son) Jason Zone-Fisher, John Intrater, and H. Spencer Young.

=== 2010 U.S. Senate campaign ===
In February 2009, Fisher announced his campaign to replace George Voinovich in the U.S. Senate. On May 4, 2010, Fisher won the Democratic primary, defeating Ohio Secretary of State Jennifer Brunner.

In the general election on November 2, 2010, Fisher faced Republican nominee Rob Portman, a former Cincinnati congressman and Bush administration official. Portman received 57% of the votes to Fisher's 39%. Fisher carried only six of Ohio's 88 counties and three of 18 congressional districts.

United States Senate election in Ohio, 2010
Party	Candidate	Votes	%	±%
Republican	Robert Jones Portman	2,168,742	56.85%	−6.61%
Democratic	Lee Irwin Fisher	1,503,297	39.40%	+2.85%
Constitution	Eric Deaton	65,856	1.72%	N/A
Independent	Michael Pryce	50,101	1.31%	N/A
Socialist	Daniel LaBotz	26,454	0.69%	N/A
N/A	Arthur Sullivan (write-in)	648	0.02%	N/A
Majority		665,445	17.44%	
Total votes		3,815,098	100.00%	
Republican hold		Swing	NA	

=== Higher education administration ===
In 2016, Fisher was appointed interim dean of Cleveland State University's Cleveland–Marshall College of Law (now the Cleveland State University College of Law) for the 2016–17 academic year. On May 3, 2017, Fisher was named permanent dean after a national search. Fisher's tenure focused on leadership in the law, establishing the Cleveland-Marshall Hall of Fame, increased fundraising, and raising the school's national profile. Beginning in 2018, Fisher began teaching a course on leadership and helped establish the P. Kelly Tompkins Leadership and Law Program.

On February 10, 2025, Fisher was named the 10th president of Baldwin Wallace University, effective July 1, 2025. The appointment came after a national search. Upon accepting the position, Fisher emphasized BW's commitment to career readiness, character development, and affordable education as key institutional priorities.

== Personal life ==
Fisher is married to Peggy Zone Fisher. He has two adult children, including the sports journalist Jason Zone Fisher. He has served on two public company boards: Rex Stores (now Rex American Resources) and Office Max (before it was sold to Boise Cascade).

== Electoral history ==
Election results
Year	Office	Election	Subject	Party	Votes	%	Opponent	Party	Votes	%	Opponent	Party	Votes	%	Opponent	Party	Votes	%	Opponent	Party	Votes	%	
1980	State House	General	Lee Fisher	Democratic	?	?	Kent Minshall	Republican Party	?	?													
1982	State Senate	General	Lee Fisher	Democratic	?	?	Ben Skall	Republican Party	?	?													
1986	State Senate	General	Lee Fisher	Democratic	?	?	Unopposed in primary and general elections	?	?	?													
1990	Attorney General	Primary	Lee Fisher	Democratic	394,332	62%	Charles T. Brown	Democratic	246,729	38%													
1990	Attorney General	General	Lee Fisher	Democratic	1,680,698	50%	Paul E. Pfeifer	Republican	1,679,464	50%													
1994	Attorney General	Primary	Lee Fisher	Democratic	739,724	100%																	
1994	Attorney General	General	Lee Fisher	Democratic	1,625,247	49%	Betty Montgomery	Republican	1,716,451	51%													
1998	Governor	Primary	Lee Fisher	Democratic	663,832	100%																	
1998	Governor	General	Lee Fisher	Democratic	1,498,956	45%	Bob Taft	Republican	1,678,721	50%	John Mitchel	Reform	111,468	3%	Zanna Feitler	Independent	65,068	2%					
2006	Lieutenant Governor	General	Lee Fisher	Democratic	2,435,505	61%	Thomas A. Raga	Republican	1,474,331	37%	Mark Noble	Libertarian	71,473	2%	Anita Rios	Green	40,967	1%					*
2010	U.S. Senator	Primary	Lee Fisher	Democratic	380,189	56%	Jennifer Brunner	Democratic	304,026	44%													
2010	U.S. Senator	General	Lee Fisher	Democratic	1,448,092	39%	Rob Portman	Republican	2,125,810	57.25%	Eric Deaton	Constitution	64,017	1.72%	Michael Pryce	Independent	48,653	1.31%	Dan La Botz	Socialist	25,368	0.68%	

Write-in and minor candidate notes: In 2006, James Lundeen received 579 votes and Larry Bays received 73 votes.

== See also ==
- List of Jewish American jurists

Ohio House of Representatives
Preceded by Harry Lehman	Member of the Ohio House of Representatives from the 16th district January 3, 1981 – December 31, 1982	Succeeded by Judy Sheerer
Ohio Senate
Preceded by Paul Matia	Member of the Ohio Senate from the 25th district January 3, 1983 – December 31, 1990	Succeeded by Eric Fingerhut
Party political offices
Preceded by Tony Celebrezze	Democratic nominee for Attorney General of Ohio; 1990, 1994	Succeeded by Richard Cordray
Preceded by Rob Burch	Democratic nominee for Governor of Ohio; 1998	Succeeded by Tim Hagan
Preceded by Charleta Tavares	Democratic nominee for Lieutenant Governor of Ohio; 2006	Succeeded by Yvette McGee Brown
Preceded by Eric Fingerhut	Democratic nominee for U.S. Senator from Ohio (Class 3); 2010	Succeeded by Ted Strickland
Legal offices
Preceded by Tony Celebrezze	Attorney General of Ohio; January 14, 1991 – January 9, 1995	Succeeded by Betty Montgomery
Political offices
Preceded by Bruce Johnson	Lieutenant Governor of Ohio; January 8, 2007 – January 10, 2011	Succeeded by Mary Taylor
