= 1998 Ohio gubernatorial election =

- November 3, 1998
- Turnout: 49.81% (registered voters)
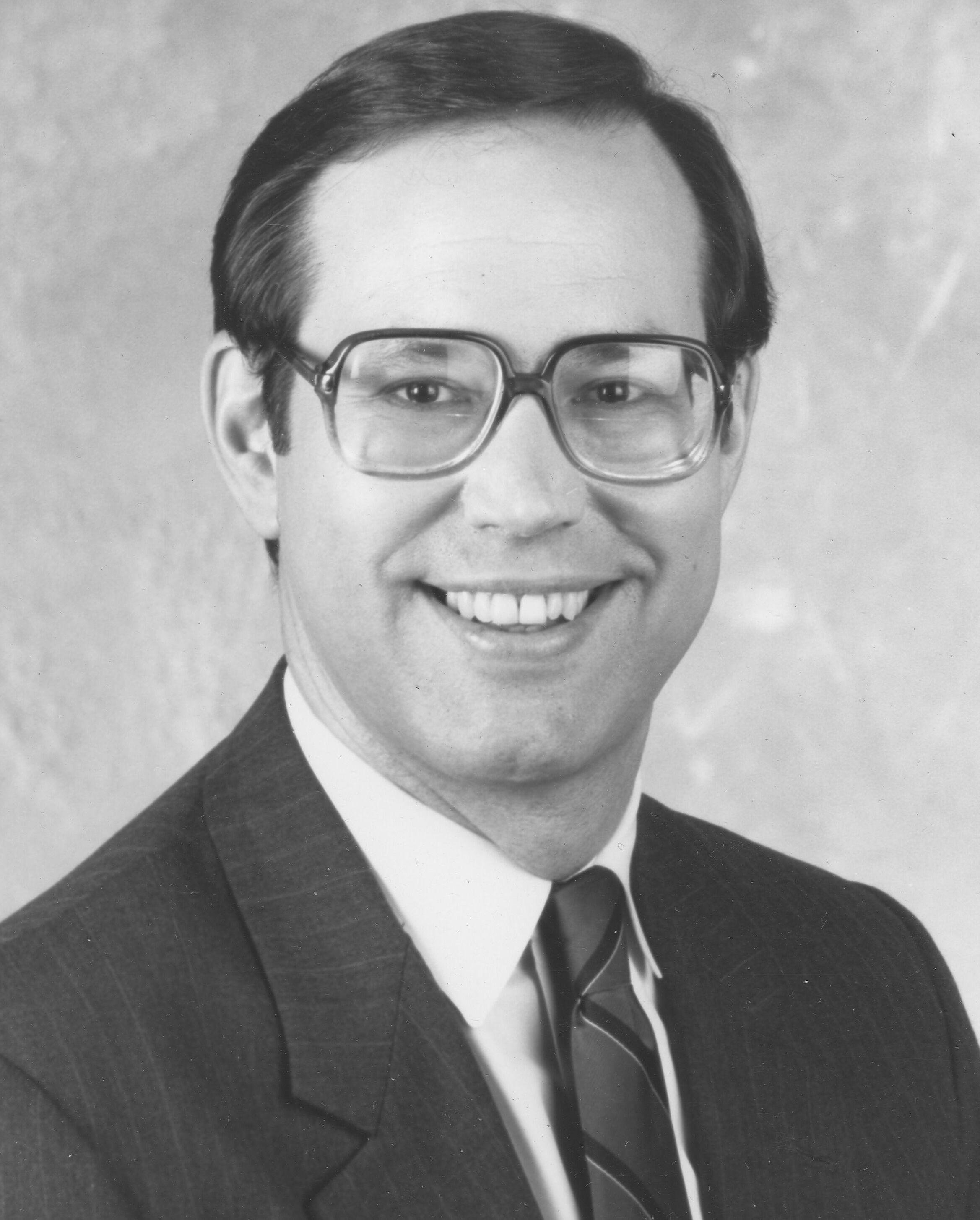

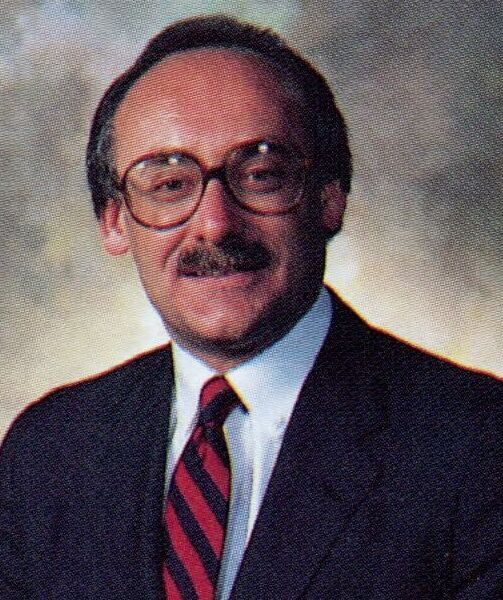
Nominee	Bob Taft	Lee Fisher
Party	Republican	Democratic
Running mate	Maureen O'Connor	Michael B. Coleman
Popular vote	1,678,721	1,498,956
Percentage	50.05%	44.69%
- County results Taft: 40–50% 50–60% 60–70% Fisher: 40–50% 50–60%
Governor before election
George Voinovich
Republican
Elected Governor
Bob Taft
Republican

The 1998 Ohio gubernatorial election was held on November 3, 1998. Incumbent Republican Governor of Ohio George Voinovich could not seek a third term due to term limits, and ran for the United States Senate instead. To replace him, former Attorney General of Ohio Lee Fisher and Ohio Secretary of State Bob Taft won the Democratic and Republican primaries, respectively. Taft and Fisher faced off in a highly competitive general election, and in the end, Taft (a great-grandson of U.S. President and Supreme Court Chief Justice William Howard Taft) defeated Fisher.

== Democratic primary ==
=== Candidates ===
- Lee Fisher, former Ohio attorney general and state senator

=== Results ===
Democratic primary results
Party	Candidate	Votes	%
Democratic	Lee Fisher	663,832	100.00
Total votes		663,832	100.00

== Republican primary ==
=== Candidates ===
- Bob Taft, Ohio secretary of state and former member of the Ohio House of Representatives

=== Results ===
Republican primary results
Party	Candidate	Votes	%
Republican	Bob Taft	691,946	100.00
Total votes		691,946	100.00

== General election ==
=== Candidates ===
- Zanna Feitler (Natural Law)
- Lee Fisher, former Ohio attorney general and state senator (Democratic)
- John R. Mitchel (Reform)
- Bob Taft, Ohio secretary of state and former member of the Ohio House of Representatives (Republican)

=== Polling ===
Poll source	Date(s)	Sample size (Note: Key: A – all adults RV – registered voters LV – likely voters V – unclear)	Margin of error	Bob Taft (R)	Lee Fisher (D)	Undecided
Louis Harris and Associates (Note: Poll sponsored by The Blade, The Cincinnati Post, & WLIO-TV)	October 30–31, 1998	773 (RV)	± 4.0%	44%	39%	17%
Harris Insights & Analytics	October 30, 1998	2,149	—	52%	42%	6%
Mason-Dixon	October 25–27, 1998	815 (LV)	± 3.5%	49%	42%	9%
Columbus Dispatch	October 27, 1998	800	—	47%	46%	7%
Louis Harris and Associates	October 23–26, 1998	679 (LV)	± 4.0%	47%	43%	10%
University of Cincinnati	October 22–26, 1998	754 (LV)	± 3.6%	51%	35%	14%
Harris Insights & Analytics	October 20, 1998	1,793	—	50%	39%	11%
Gordon S. Black Corp.	October 18, 1998	1,012	—	36%	28%	36%
University of Cincinnati	October 8–18, 1998	540 (LV)	± 4.2%	52%	37%	11%
University of Cincinnati	October 2–7, 1998	405 (LV)	± 5.0%	46%	37%	17%
Mason-Dixon	October 2–5, 1998	805 (LV)	± 3.5%	48%	40%	12%
University of Cincinnati	September 8–20, 1998	521 (LV)	± 4.3%	49%	39%	12%
Mason-Dixon	September 12–14, 1998	817 (LV)	± 3.5%	44%	35%	21%
University of Cincinnati	May 13 – June 1, 1998	560 (RV)	± 4.0%	52%	36%	12%

=== Results ===
Ohio gubernatorial election, 1998
Party	Candidate	Votes	%	±%
Republican	Bob Taft	1,678,721	50.05%	−21.72%
Democratic	Lee Fisher	1,498,956	44.69%	+19.71%
Reform	John R. Mitchel	111,468	3.32%	
Natural Law	Zanna Feitler	65,068	1.94%	
Majority		179,765	5.36%	−41.43%
Turnout		3,354,213		
Republican hold		Swing		

== Notes ==
Partisan clients
