= Rob Portman =

American lawyer and politician (born 1955)

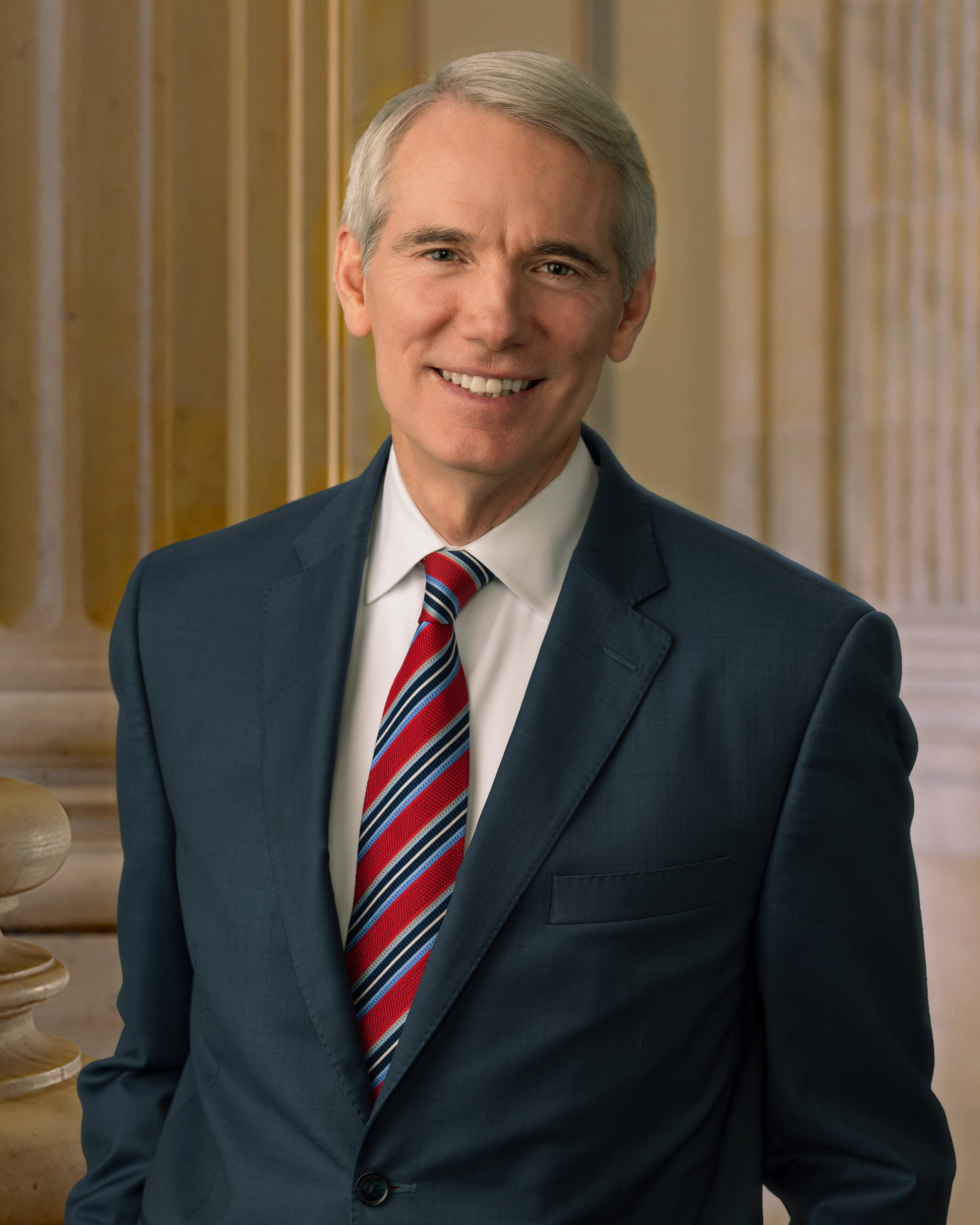
- Official portrait, 2018

Ranking Member of the Senate Homeland Security Committee
- In office February 3, 2021 – January 3, 2023
- Preceded by: Gary Peters
- Succeeded by: Rand Paul

United States Senator from Ohio
- In office January 3, 2011 – January 3, 2023
- Preceded by: George Voinovich
- Succeeded by: JD Vance

35th Director of the Office of Management and Budget
- In office May 29, 2006 – June 19, 2007
- President: George W. Bush
- Deputy: Steve McMillin
- Preceded by: Joshua Bolten
- Succeeded by: Jim Nussle

14th United States Trade Representative
- In office May 17, 2005 – May 29, 2006
- President: George W. Bush
- Preceded by: Robert Zoellick
- Succeeded by: Susan Schwab

Member of the U.S. House of Representatives from Ohio's 2nd district
- In office May 4, 1993 – April 29, 2005 (Note: Portman's official service begins on the date of the special election, while he was not sworn in until May 5, 1993.)
- Preceded by: Bill Gradison
- Succeeded by: Jean Schmidt

White House Director of Legislative Affairs
- In office September 25, 1989 – April 12, 1991
- President: George H. W. Bush
- Preceded by: Gordon Wheeler
- Succeeded by: Stephen Hart

Personal details
- Born: Robert Jones Portman; December 19, 1955 (age 70) Cincinnati, Ohio, U.S.
- Party: Republican
- Spouse: Jane Dudley (m. 1986)
- Children: 3
- Education: Dartmouth College (BA); University of Michigan (JD)
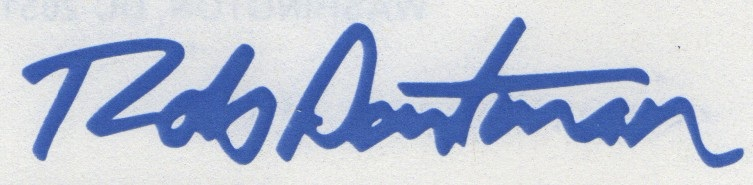
- Signature
- Portman's voice Portman on his proposed Strengthen Opioid Misuse Prevention (STOP) Act of 2017. Recorded February 2, 2017

Robert Jones Portman (born December 19, 1955) is an American attorney and politician who served as a United States senator from Ohio from 2011 to 2023. A member of the Republican Party, Portman was the 35th director of the Office of Management and Budget (OMB) from 2006 to 2007, the 14th United States trade representative from 2005 to 2006, and a U.S. representative from 1993 to 2005, representing Ohio's 2nd district.

In 1993, Portman won a special election to represent Ohio's 2nd congressional district in the U.S. House of Representatives. He was reelected six times before resigning upon his appointment by President George W. Bush as the U.S. trade representative in May 2005. As trade representative, Portman initiated trade agreements with other countries and pursued claims at the World Trade Organization. In May 2006, Bush appointed Portman the director of the Office of Management and Budget.

In 2010, Portman announced his candidacy for the United States Senate seat being vacated by George Voinovich. He easily defeated then-Lieutenant Governor Lee Fisher and was reelected in 2016, defeating former Governor Ted Strickland. On January 25, 2021, he announced that he would not seek a third term in 2022.

After leaving office in 2023, Portman founded The Portman Center for Policy Solutions at the University of Cincinnati. He currently serves as a Distinguished Visiting Fellow in the Practice of Public Policy at the American Enterprise Institute. Additionally, he currently serves as an independent director at Procter & Gamble.

== Early life ==
Portman was born in 1955, in Cincinnati, Ohio, the son of Joan (née Jones) and William C. "Bill" Portman II. His family was Presbyterian.

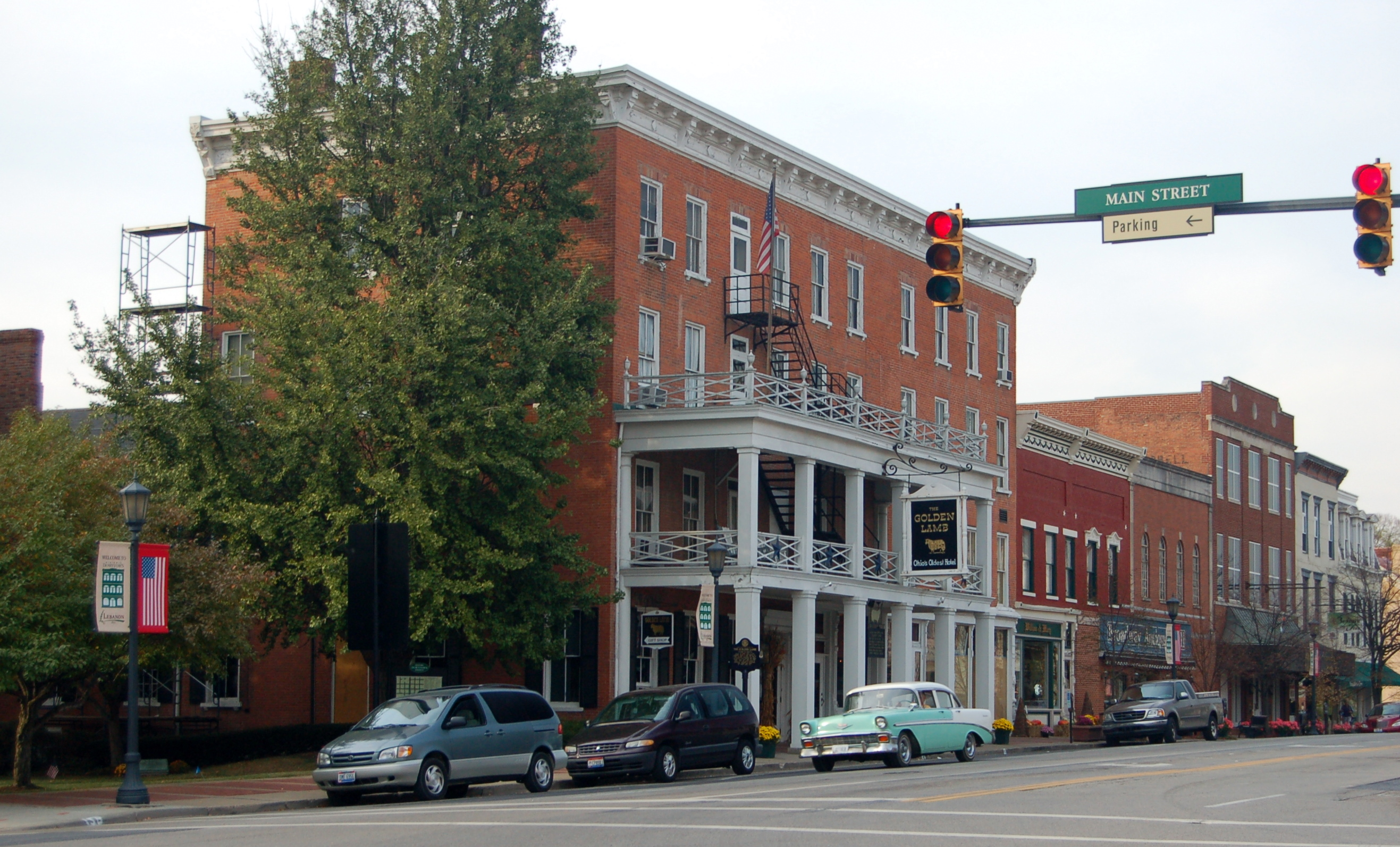
The Golden Lamb Inn, Ohio's oldest continually operating restaurant and inn, is owned by the Portman family.

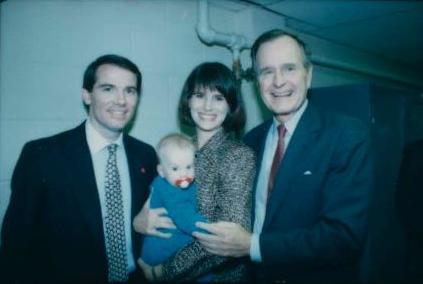
Portman with President George H. W. Bush in 1990

In 1926, Portman's grandfather Robert Jones purchased the Golden Lamb Inn in Lebanon, Ohio, and, together with his future wife Virginia Kunkle Jones, refurbished it and decorated it with antique collectibles and Shaker furniture. The couple ran the inn together until 1969, when they retired.

When Portman was young, his father started the Portman Equipment Company, a forklift dealership where he and his siblings worked growing up. From his mother Joan, a liberal Republican, Portman inherited his sympathy for the Republican Party.

== Education and early career ==
Portman graduated from Cincinnati Country Day School in 1974 and attended Dartmouth College, where he started leaning to the right, and majored in anthropology and earned a Bachelor of Arts in 1978. In Cincinnati, Portman worked on Bill Gradison's congressional campaign, and Gradison soon became a mentor to Portman. Portman next entered the University of Michigan Law School, earning his Juris Doctor degree in 1984 and serving as vice president of the student senate. During law school, he embarked on a kayaking and hiking trip across China and met Jane Dudley, whom he married in 1986. After graduating from law school, Portman moved to Washington, D.C., where he worked for the law firm Patton Boggs. Some describe his role there as a lobbyist; others say that such a description is inaccurate. Portman next became an associate at Graydon Head & Ritchey LLP, a law firm in Cincinnati.

In 1989, Portman began his career in government as an associate White House Counsel under President George H. W. Bush. From 1989 to 1991, he served as Bush's deputy assistant and director of the White House Office of Legislative Affairs. While serving as White House counsel, Portman visited China, Egypt, Kuwait, Saudi Arabia and the United Arab Emirates.

== United States Representative (1993–2005) ==
In 1993, Portman entered a special election to fill the seat of Congressman Bill Gradison of Ohio's second congressional district, who had stepped down to become president of the Health Insurance Association of America. In the Republican primary, Portman faced six-term Congressman Bob McEwen, who had lost his Sixth District seat to Ted Strickland in November 1992; real estate developer Jay Buchert, president of the National Association of Home Builders; and several lesser known candidates.

In the primary, Portman was criticized for his previous law firm's work for Haitian president Baby Doc Duvalier. Buchert ran campaign commercials labeling Portman and McEwen "Prince Rob and Bouncing Bob." Portman lost four of the district's five counties, but won the largest, Hamilton County, his home county and home to 57% of the district's population. Largely on the strength of his victory in Hamilton, Portman took 17,531 votes (36%) overall, making him the winner.

In the general election, Portman defeated the Democratic nominee, attorney Lee Hornberger, 53,020 (70%) to 22,652 (29%).

Portman was reelected in 1994, 1996, 1998, 2000, 2002, and 2004, defeating Democrats Les Mann, Thomas R. Chandler, and then Waynesville mayor Charles W. Sanders four times in a row.

=== House legislative career ===
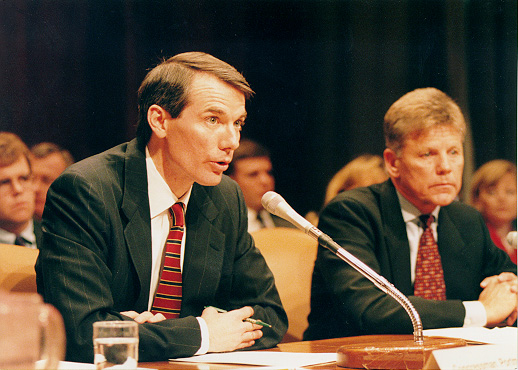
Rob Portman testifying before the Senate Budget Committee in 1998

As of 2004, Portman had a lifetime rating of 89 from the American Conservative Union, and ranked 5th among Ohio's 18 House members.

One of Portman's first votes in Congress was for the North American Free Trade Agreement on November 17, 1993.

Of Portman's work on the Internal Revenue Service Restructuring and Reform Act of 1998, Pete Sepp of the National Taxpayers Union said, "He set a professional work environment that rose above partisanship and ultimately gave taxpayers more rights." Democratic Representative Stephanie Tubbs Jones from Cleveland said Portman, "compared to other Republicans, is pleasant and good to work with." During the first four years of the George W. Bush Administration, Portman served as a liaison between congressional Republicans and the White House. Portman voted for the Iraq War Resolution in 2002. He was known for his willingness to work with Democrats to enact important legislation.

Portman has said that his proudest moments as a U.S. Representative were "when we passed the balanced budget agreement and the welfare reform bill." As a congressman, Portman traveled to Argentina, Chile, Costa Rica, the Czech Republic, Egypt, Iraq, Israel, Jordan, Kuwait and Mexico. During his time in the House, Portman began assisting prominent Republican candidates prepare for debates by standing in for their opponents in practice debates. He took the role of Lamar Alexander (for Bob Dole in 1996), Al Gore (for George W. Bush in 2000), Hillary Clinton (for Rick Lazio in 2000), Joe Lieberman (for Dick Cheney in 2000), John Edwards (for Cheney in 2004), and Barack Obama (for John McCain in 2008 and Mitt Romney in 2012). His portrayals mimic not only the person's point of view but also their mannerisms, noting for instance that he listened to Obama's audiobook reading to study his pattern of speech.

== George W. Bush administration (2005–2007) ==
=== United States Trade Representative ===
On March 17, 2005, Portman spoke at the White House during a ceremony at which Bush nominated him for United States Trade Representative, calling him "a good friend, a decent man, and a skilled negotiator." Portman was confirmed on April 29 and sworn in on May 17.

Portman sponsored an unfair-trading claim to the World Trade Organization against Airbus because American allies in the European Union were providing subsidies that arguably helped Airbus compete against Boeing. European officials countered that Boeing received unfair subsidies from the United States, and the WTO ruled separately that they each received unfair government assistance.

Portman spent significant time out of the United States negotiating trade agreements with roughly 30 countries, visiting Brazil, Burkina Faso, China, France, Hong Kong, India, Mexico, South Korea, Switzerland and the United Kingdom. During his tenure, he also helped to win passage of the Central American Free Trade Agreement. Portman used a network of former House colleagues to get support for the treaty to lift trade barriers between the United States and Costa Rica, the Dominican Republic, El Salvador, Nicaragua, Guatemala, and Honduras. According to The Hill, Portman took his wife, Jane, with him to the Capitol on their wedding anniversary so he could work on the deal.

==== Hong Kong and trade suit ====
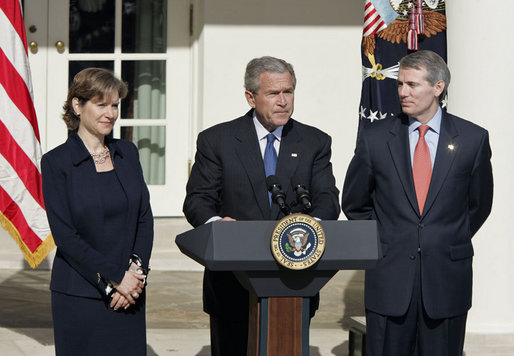
Portman nominated for OMB Director and Schwab nominated for USTR, 2006

As United States Trade Representative, Portman attended the WTO's Hong Kong conference in 2005. He addressed the conference with a speech on development in Doha, and advocated a 60% cut in targeted worldwide agricultural subsidies by 2010. Portman then sponsored a claim against China for extra charges it levied on American auto parts. U.S. steel manufacturers subsequently beseeched the White House to halt an influx of Chinese steel pipe used to make plumbing and fence materials. This was a recurring complaint and the United States International Trade Commission recommended imposing import quotas, noting "the economic threat to the domestic pipe industry from the Chinese surge." With Portman as his top trade advisor, Bush replied that quotas were in the U.S. economic interest. He reasoned the American homebuilding industry used the pipe and wanted to maintain a cheap supply and that other cheap exporters would step in to fill China's void if Chinese exports were curtailed. This occurred at a time when the U.S. steel industry lost $150 million in profit between 2005 and 2007, although China's minister of commerce cited the U.S. industry's "record high profit margins" in the first half of 2004 and continued growth in 2005. China next lobbied Portman to leave matters alone, meeting with his office twice and threatening in a letter that restrictions and what it called "discrimination against Chinese products" would bring "serious adverse impact" to the U.S.-China economic and trade relationship. Portman vowed to "hold [China's] feet to the fire" and provide a "top-to-bottom review" of the U.S.–China trade relationship. His claim that China had improperly favored domestic auto parts became the first successful trade suit against China in the WTO. During Portman's tenure as trade ambassador, the U.S. trade deficit with China increased by 21 percent.

=== Director of the Office of Management and Budget ===
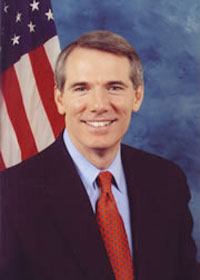
Portrait of Rob Portman used during his time as OMB Director

On April 18, 2006, Bush nominated Portman for Director of the Office of Management and Budget, replacing Joshua Bolten, who was appointed White House Chief of Staff. Portman said that he looked forward to the responsibility, adding, "It's a big job. The Office of Management and Budget touches every spending and policy decision in the federal government". Bush expressed his confidence in Portman, saying, "The job of OMB director is a really important post and Rob Portman is the right man to take it on. Rob's talent, expertise and record of success are well known within my administration and on Capitol Hill." The U.S. Senate confirmed him unanimously by voice vote on May 26, 2006.

As OMB director from May 2006 to August 2007, Portman helped craft a $2.9 trillion budget for fiscal year 2008. The Cincinnati Enquirer wrote, "The plan called for making the 2001 and 2003 tax cuts permanent, at a cost of more than $500 billion over the five-year life of the proposal. It requested a hefty increase in military spending, along with reductions in low-income housing assistance, environmental initiatives, and healthcare safety-net programs." Portman is said to have been "frustrated" with the post, calling the budget that Bush's office sent to Congress "not my budget, his budget," and saying, "it was a fight, internally." Edward Lazear of Bush's Council of Economic Advisers said that Portman was the leading advocate for a balanced budget, while other former Bush administration officials said that Portman was the leading advocate for fiscal discipline within the administration.

On June 19, 2007, Portman resigned as OMB director, citing a desire to spend more time with his family and three children. Democratic Chairman of the Senate Budget Committee Kent Conrad expressed regret at Portman's resignation, saying, "He is a person of credibility and decency that commanded respect on both sides of the aisle."

== Post-White House career ==
On November 8, 2007, Portman joined the law firm Squire Sanders as part of its transactional and international trade practice in Cincinnati, Ohio. His longtime chief of staff, Rob Lehman, also joined the firm as a lobbyist in its Washington, D.C. office. In 2007, Portman founded Ohio's Future P.A.C., a political action committee. In 2008, he was cited as a potential running mate for Republican presidential nominee John McCain. Portman remained critical of the American Recovery and Reinvestment Act of 2009, passed while he was out of office.

== United States Senator (2011–2023) ==
Map detailing the Ohio counties that Portman received pluralities within (shown in red) during the 2010 U.S. Senate election

Map detailing the Ohio counties that Portman received pluralities within (shown in red) during the 2016 U.S. Senate election

=== Elections ===
==== 2010 ====
On January 14, 2009, two days after George Voinovich announced he would not be running for re-election, Portman publicly declared his candidacy for the open U.S. Senate seat. Running unopposed in the Republican primary, Portman benefitted substantially from Tea Party support, and by July 2010 had raised more campaign funds than Democrat Lee Fisher by a 9 to 1 margin. Portman campaigned on the issue of jobs and job growth.

Of all candidates for public office in the US, Portman was the top recipient of corporate money from insurance industries and commercial banks in 2010. Portman possessed the most campaign funds of any Republican during 2010, at $5.1 million, raising $1.3 million in his third quarter of fundraising.

Portman won the election by a margin of 57 to 39 percent, winning 82 of Ohio's 88 counties. In a 2010 campaign advertisement, Portman said a "[ cap-and-trade bill] could cost Ohio 100,000 jobs we cannot afford to lose;" subsequently, The Cleveland Plain Dealer and PolitiFact called Portman's claim "barely true" with the most pessimistic estimates.

==== 2016 ====
The 2016 re-election campaign posed several special challenges to Portman and his team—it would be run in heavily targeted Ohio, it would occur in a presidential year when Democratic turnout was expected to peak, and both parties would bombard Ohio voters with tens of millions of dollars in TV, cable and digital ads for the national, senatorial and downticket contests. For his campaign manager, Portman chose Corry Bliss, who had just run the successful re-election of Sen. Pat Roberts in Kansas. Portman and Bliss chose to run what Time magazine called "a hyperlocal campaign without betting on the nominee's coattails."

As Real Clear Politics noted, Portman faced "the thorny challenge of keeping distance from Trump in a state Trump [was] poised to win. Portman, in the year of the outsider, [was] even more of an insider than Clinton ... Yet he [ran] a local campaign focused on issues like human trafficking and opioid addiction, and secured the endorsement of the Teamsters as well as other unions" (despite being a mostly conservative Republican).

Polls showed the race even (or Portman slightly behind) as of June 2016; afterwards, Portman led Democratic ex-Gov. Ted Strickland in every public survey through Election Day. The final result was 58.0% to 37.2%, nearly a 21-point margin for Portman.

Chris Cillizza of The Washington Post argued that the context of Ohio's result had wider implications. "There are a lot of reasons Republicans held the Senate this fall. But Portman's candidacy in Ohio is the most important one. Portman took a seemingly competitive race in a swing state and put it out of reach by Labor Day, allowing money that was ticketed for his state to be in other races, such as North Carolina and Missouri ..."

The Washington Post said "Portman took the crown for best campaign", while Real Clear Politics said, "Sen. Rob Portman ran the campaign of the year.". Portman himself was generous in praising his campaign manager: "With an emphasis on utilizing data, grassroots, and technology, Corry led our campaign from behind in the polls to a 21-point victory. He's one of the best strategists in the country."

=== Tenure ===
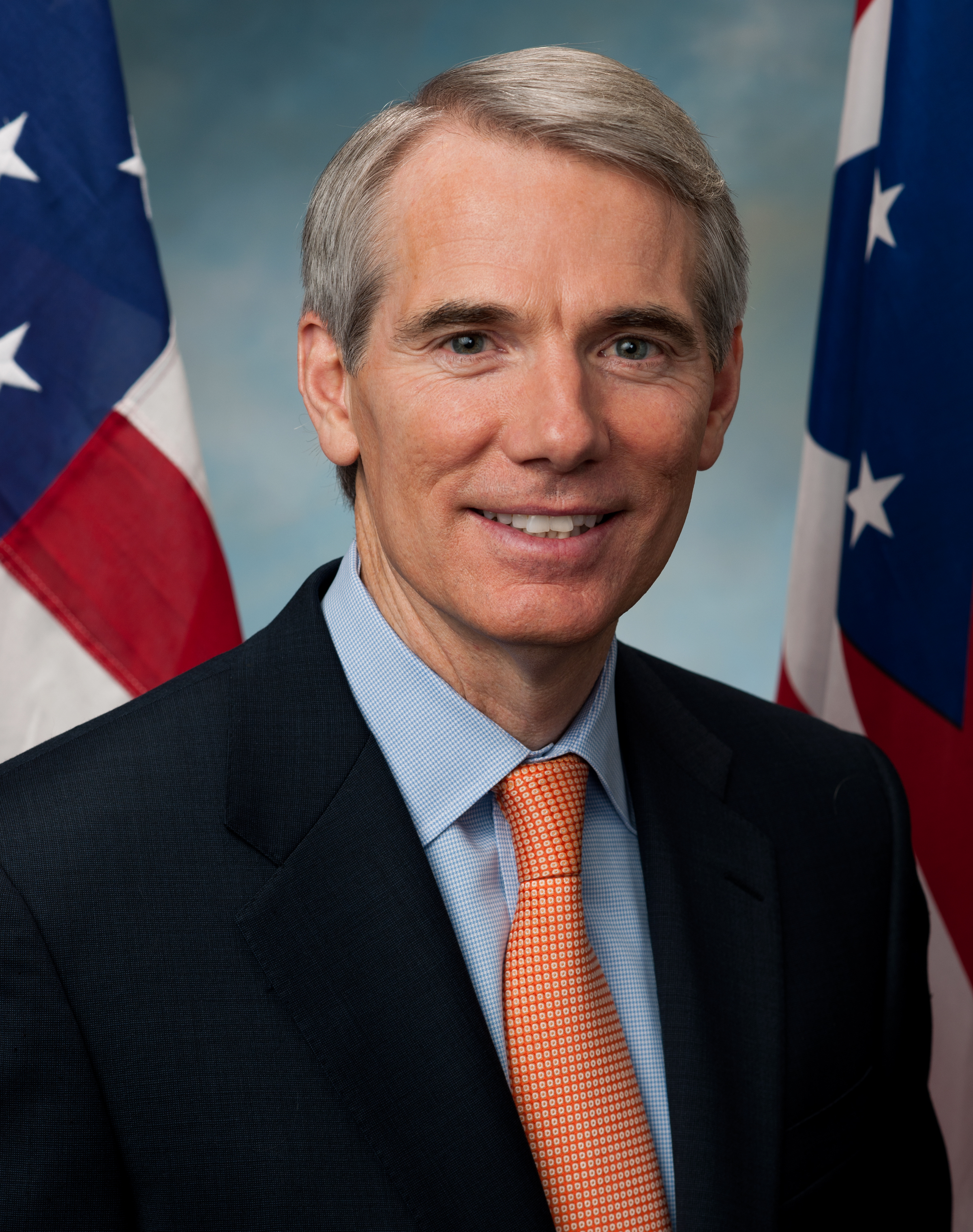
Portman's portrait during the 112th Congress

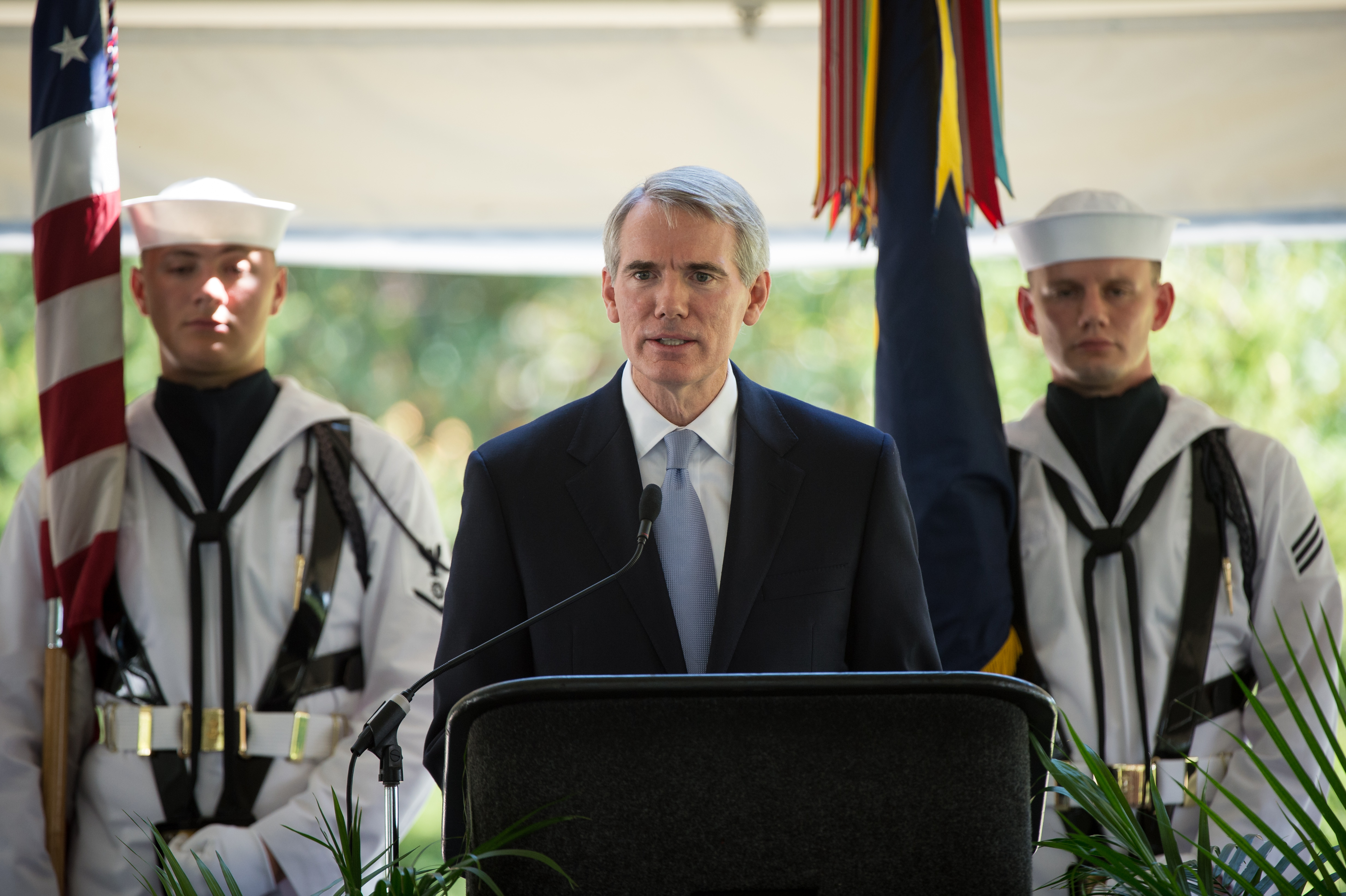
Portman speaks at the memorial of Neil Armstrong, 2012.

In the 112th Congress, Portman voted with his party 90% of the time. However, in the 114th United States Congress, Portman was ranked as the third most bipartisan member of the U.S. Senate by the Bipartisan Index, a metric created jointly by The Lugar Center and the McCourt School of Public Policy to reflect congressional bipartisanship. During the first session of the 115th Congress, Portman's bipartisanship score improved further, propelling him to second in the Senate rankings (only Senator Susan Collins scoring higher), Portman's intellectual leadership among the Senate G.O.P., and his fundraising capabilities, led to his being named the Vice Chairman for Finance of the National Republican Senatorial Committee for the 2014 election cycle. In March 2013, Portman was one of several Republican senators invited to have dinner with President Obama at The Jefferson Hotel in an attempt by the administration to court perceived moderate members of the upper chamber for building consensual motivation in Congress; however, Portman did not attend and instead had dinner with an unnamed Democratic senator.

Portman delivered the eulogy at the August 2012 funeral of Neil Armstrong, and the commencement address at the University of Cincinnati's December 2012 graduation ceremony.

In August 2011, Portman was selected by Minority Leader Mitch McConnell to participate in the United States Congress Joint Select Committee on Deficit Reduction. During the committee's work, Portman developed strong relationships with the other members, especially Sen. John Kerry and Rep. Chris Van Hollen. The committee was ultimately unsuccessful, with Portman left disappointed, saying "I am very sad about this process not succeeding because it was a unique opportunity to both address the fiscal crisis and give the economy a shot in the arm."

Portman spoke at the May 7, 2011 Michigan Law School commencement ceremonies, which was the subject of criticism by some who opposed his stance on same-sex marriage. He and his wife walked in the 50th anniversary march over the Edmund Pettus Bridge commemorating Bloody Sunday and the March on Selma.

On January 25, 2021, Portman announced that he would not run for a third term in 2022. In a statement, he said he looked forward to "focus[ing] all my energy on legislation and the challenges our country faces rather than on fundraising and campaigning." He added, "I have consistently been named one of the most bipartisan senators. I am proud of that and I will continue to reach out to my colleagues on both sides of the aisle to find common ground. Eighty-two of my bills were signed into law by President Trump, and 68 were signed into law by President Obama." Of why he chose not to seek another term, he said, "I don't think any Senate office has been more successful in getting things done, but honestly, it has gotten harder and harder to break through the partisan gridlock and make progress on substantive policy, and that has contributed to my decision."

Committee assignments

- United States Senate Committee on Finance
  - Subcommittee on Health Care
  - Subcommittee on Taxation and IRS Oversight (Ranking Member)
  - Subcommittee on Social Security, Pensions, and Family Policy
- United States Senate Committee on Energy and Natural Resources
  - Subcommittee on Energy
  - Subcommittee on National Parks
  - Subcommittee on Water and Power
- United States Senate Committee on Homeland Security and Governmental Affairs
  - Permanent Subcommittee on Investigations (Ranking Member)
  - Subcommittee on Regulatory Affairs and Federal Management
- United States Senate Committee on Foreign Relations
  - Subcommittee on Europe and Regional Security Cooperation
  - Subcommittee on Near East, South Asia, Central Asia, and Counter-Terrorism
  - Subcommittee on State Department and USAID Management, International Operations, and Bilateral International Development
  - Subcommittee on Multilateral Development, Multilateral Institutions, and International Economic, Energy, and Monetary Policy

Caucus memberships

Portman belonged to the following caucuses in the United States Senate:

- Congressional Serbian American Caucus
- International Conservation Caucus (Co-chair)
- Sportsmen's Caucus
- Senate Ukraine Caucus (Co-chair)
- Senate Artificial Intelligence Caucus (Co-chair)

== Political positions ==
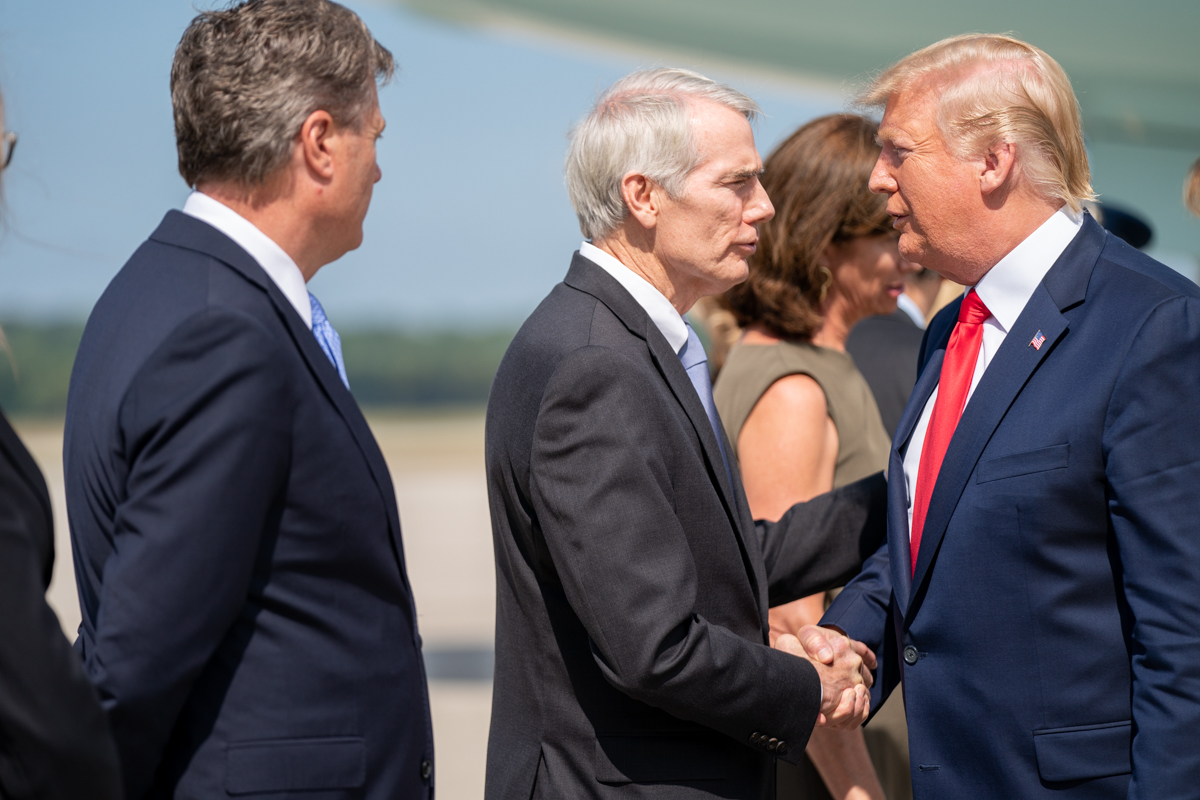
Portman greeting President Donald Trump in 2019

According to the Encyclopædia Britannica, while in the Senate, Portman portrayed himself as a "deficit hawk" and was "considered a centrist-to-conservative Republican" who has typically voted with the party leadership, although he broke with it on a number of issues, including same-sex marriage. In 2013, Portman was several times described as staunchly conservative. During the Trump administration, Portman was characterized as a centrist or moderate Republican. In 2020, Portman's former campaign manager described him as a "proud conservative". Chris Cillizza, writing in 2014, described Portman as more governance-oriented than campaign-oriented.

GovTrack places Portman toward the center of the Senate's ideological spectrum; according to GovTrack's analysis, Portman is the third most moderate Republican in 2017 being to the right of Susan Collins and Lisa Murkowski but to the left of his other Republican colleagues. The American Conservative Union gives Portman a lifetime 79% conservative grade. The progressive Americans for Democratic Action gave Portman a 25% liberal quotient in 2014. The non-partisan National Journal gave Portman a 2013 composite ideology score of 71% conservative and 29% liberal.

According to FiveThirtyEight, which tracks congressional records, Portman voted in line with Trump's position on legislation 90.4% of the time. As of October 2022, he had voted with Biden's positions about 61.8% of the time. CQ RollCall, which also tracks voting records, found that Portman voted with President Obama's positions on legislation 59.5% of the time in 2011. He was one of five Senate Republicans who voted with Obama's position more than half the time.

=== 2012 presidential election ===
Portman was considered a possible pick for vice president on the Republican presidential ticket in 2012. Chris Cillizza wrote that Portman's time in both the executive and legislative branches would qualify him for the role.

After Mitt Romney selected Paul Ryan as his running mate, Portman spoke at the 2012 Republican National Convention about trade and his family business. On trade agreements, Portman stated: "President Obama is the first president in 75 years-Democrat or Republican-who hasn't even sought the ability to negotiate export agreements and open markets overseas. Now why is this important? Because 95 percent of the world's consumers live outside our borders. And to create jobs, our workers and our farmers need to sell more of what we make to those people." In October 2012, Romney spoke at and toured Portman's Golden Lamb Inn.

Portman portrayed President Obama in Romney's mock debate sessions for the general election, reprising a role that he played in the debate preparations of Republican presidential nominee John McCain in 2008.

=== 2016 presidential campaign ===
In March 2014, Larry Sabato of the University of Virginia Center for Politics speculated that Portman might run for president in 2016. In October 2014, students from the College of William and Mary formed the Draft Rob Portman PAC to encourage Portman to run for president in 2016. However, Portman announced in December 2014 that he would not run for president and would instead seek a second term in the United States Senate.

Portman initially endorsed his fellow Ohioan, Governor John Kasich, during the Republican primaries. In May 2016, after Kasich dropped out of the race and Trump became the presumptive Republican nominee, Portman endorsed Trump. After the emergence of old audio recordings where Trump bragged about inappropriately touching women without their consent in October 2016, Portman announced that he was rescinding his endorsement of Trump and would instead cast a write-in vote for Trump's running mate, Indiana Gov. Mike Pence.

=== 2020 campaign, Capitol attack, and Trump impeachments ===
In the 2020 presidential election, Portman supported Trump, in a reversal of his 2016 vote. Portman maintained his support for Trump during the impeachment proceedings against Trump for his conduct in the Trump–Ukraine scandal. Portman said that it was "wrong and inappropriate" for Trump to ask a foreign government to investigate a political rival, and that he accepted that there was quid pro quo between Trump and Ukraine in which U.S. aid to Ukraine was on the line, but that he did not consider it to be an impeachable offense. Following the Senate trial of Trump, Portman voted to acquit Trump on charges of abuse of power and obstruction of Congress. Portman also opposed proposals to formally censure Trump.

Portman was the Ohio state co-chair of Trump's 2020 re-election campaign. After Joe Biden won the 2020 presidential election and Trump refused to concede, Portman initially refused to acknowledge Biden as the president-elect of the United States, although he did acknowledge that it was appropriate for Biden's transition to begin and that, contrary to Trump's false claims, there was no evidence of irregularities that would change the election outcome. Portman accepted the election results six weeks after the election, after the December 15 Electoral College vote.

Portman opposed Trump's attempt to overturn the election results, and did not back a last-ditch effort by Trump's Republican allies in Congress to object to the formal counting of the electoral votes from swing states in which Biden defeated Trump. Portman said, "I cannot support allowing Congress to thwart the will of the voters" and voted against the objections. After Congress's counting of the electoral votes was interrupted by a pro-Trump mob that attempted an insurrection at the Capitol on January 6, 2021, Portman said Trump "bears some responsibility" for the attack. After Trump was impeached by the House of Representatives for incitement of insurrection, Portman joined most Republican senators in an unsuccessful motion to dismiss the charges and avoid a Senate impeachment trial on the basis that Trump's term had expired and he had become a private citizen. On February 13, 2021, Portman voted to acquit Trump on charges of inciting the January 6 attack on the Capitol.

==== January 6 commission ====
On May 27, 2021, along with five other Republicans and all present Democrats, Portman voted to establish a bipartisan commission to investigate the January 6 United States Capitol attack. The vote failed for the lack of 60 required "yes" votes.

=== Abortion ===
On abortion, Portman describes himself as being pro-life. He voted in favor of banning abortion after 20 weeks of pregnancy. Portman supports legal access to abortion in cases of rape and incest or if the woman's life is in danger. National Right to Life Committee and the Campaign for Working Families, both anti-abortion PACs, gave Portman a 100% rating in 2018; NARAL Pro-Choice America gives him a 0%, Planned Parenthood, which is pro-choice, gives him a lifetime 4% rating, and Population Connection, another pro-choice PAC, gave Portman an 11% rating in 2002.

In 2013, Portman sponsored a bill that would have made it a federal crime to transport a minor across state lines for an abortion if doing so would circumvent state parental consent or notification laws.

=== SFC Heath Robinson Honoring Our Promise to Address Comprehensive Toxics (PACT) Act ===
In July 2022, Portman voted for the SFC Heath Robinson Honoring Our Promise to Address Comprehensive Toxics (PACT) Act, which would provide care for veterans suffering from diseases caused by burn pit exposure while serving overseas. He put out a press release celebrating his vote, but changed his position when the House returned the final version of the bill to the Senate, and voted against it.

=== Budget and economy ===
Portman is a leading advocate for a balanced budget amendment. Portman worked with Democratic Senator Jon Tester in 2012 to end the practice of government shutdowns and partnered with Democratic Senator Claire McCaskill on an inquiry into the Obama administration's public relations spending. Portman has proposed "a balanced approach to the deficit" by reforming entitlement programs, writing "[r]eforms should not merely squeeze health beneficiaries or providers but should rather reshape key aspects of these programs to make them more efficient, flexible and consumer-oriented." Portman became known for his ability to work in a bipartisan fashion when working to pass a repeal of the excise tax on telephone service. He also unsuccessfully proposed an amendment to the surface transportation reauthorization bill to allow states to keep the gas tax money they collect, instead of sending it to Washington with some returned later. On August 10, 2021, he was one of 19 Republican senators to vote with the Democratic caucus in favor of the Infrastructure Investment and Jobs Act. In October 2021, Portman voted with 10 other Republicans and every member of the Democratic caucus to end the filibuster on raising the debt ceiling, but voted against the bill to raise the debt ceiling.

=== LGBT rights ===
While still in the U.S. House, Portman co-sponsored the Defense of Marriage Act, a bill passed in 1996 that banned federal recognition of same-sex marriage; in 1999, he voted for a measure prohibiting same-sex couples in Washington D.C. from adopting children. On March 14, 2013, Portman publicly announced that he had changed his stance on same-sex marriage, and now supported its legalization, becoming the first sitting Republican U.S. senator to do so. The change came two years after his son Will came out to Portman and his wife as gay in 2011. The Human Rights Campaign (HRC), which supports same-sex marriage and gay rights, gave Portman a 45% score in 2014 and an 85% score in 2016; the HRC also gives Portman a 100% rating for sharing its position on same-sex marriage.

In November 2013, Portman was one of 10 Republican senators to vote for the Employment Non-Discrimination Act (ENDA), after the Senate adopted an amendment he proposed to expand religious protections.

After the House passed a bill to federally protect gay marriage on July 19, 2022, a press spokesman for Portman said he would cosponsor the bill in the Senate. He cosponsored the bill the following day. He was one of 12 Republicans in the Senate voting to advance and pass the Respect for Marriage Act, the legislation protecting federal same-sex marriage rights into federal law.

=== Women's rights ===
Portman voted for reauthorization of the Violence Against Women Act in 2013.

=== Environment ===
In 2011, Portman voted to limit the government's ability to regulate greenhouse gas emissions, and in 2015, he voted to block the Clean Power Plan. In 2013, he voted for a point of order opposing a carbon tax or a fee on carbon emissions. In 2012, Portman said he wanted more oil drilling on public lands. Portman supported development of the Keystone XL pipeline, stating "The arguments when you line them up are too strong not to do this. I do think that at the end of the day the president [Obama] is going to go ahead with this."

In 2013, Portman co-sponsored a bill that would reauthorize and modify the Harmful Algal Bloom and Hypoxia Research and Control Act of 1998 and would authorize the appropriation of $20.5 million annually through 2018 for the National Oceanic and Atmospheric Administration (NOAA) to mitigate the harmful effects of algal blooms and hypoxia.

Portman co-sponsored an amendment to the 2017 Energy Bill that acknowledged that climate change is real and human activity contributes to the problem.

=== Foreign policy ===
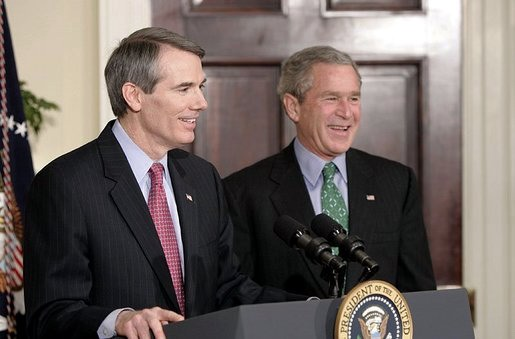
Portman with George W. Bush

Portman opposes U.S. ratification of the Convention on the Law of the Sea.

In March 2016, Portman authored the bipartisan bill Countering Foreign Propaganda and Disinformation Act, along with Democratic Senator Chris Murphy. Congressman Adam Kinzinger introduced the U.S. House version of the bill. After the 2016 U.S. presidential election, worries grew that Russian propaganda on social media spread and organized by the Russian government swayed the outcome of the election, and representatives in the U.S. Congress took action to safeguard the National security of the United States by advancing legislation to monitor incoming propaganda from external threats. On November 30, 2016, legislators approved a measure within the National Defense Authorization Act to ask the U.S. State Department to take action against foreign propaganda through an interagency panel. The legislation authorized funding of $160 million over a two-year-period. The initiative was developed through the Countering Foreign Propaganda and Disinformation Act.

==== Israel ====
In 2018 Portman and Senator Ben Cardin co-authored the Israel Anti-Boycott Act, which would make it illegal for companies to engage in boycotts against Israel or Israeli settlements in the occupied Palestinian territories. They promoted the bill and sought to integrate it into omnibus spending legislation to be signed by Trump.

=== Trade ===
Portman supported free trade agreements with Central America, Australia, Chile and Singapore, voted against withdrawing from the World Trade Organization, and was hailed by Bush for his "great record as a champion of free and fair trade."

Portman has repeatedly supported legislation to treat currency manipulation by countries as an unfair trade practice and to impose duties on Chinese imports if China does not stop the practice. In 2016, Portman opposed the Trans-Pacific Partnership (TPP) trade agreement because he said it does not address currency manipulation and includes less-strict country-of-origin rules for auto parts. In April 2015, Portman co-sponsored an amendment to Trade Promotion Authority legislation which would require the Obama administration to seek enforceable rules to prevent currency manipulation by trade partners as part of TPP.

In January 2018, Portman was one of 36 Republican senators who asked Trump to preserve the North American Free Trade Agreement.

In November 2018, Portman was one of 12 Republican senators to sign a letter to Trump requesting the United States-Mexico-Canada Agreement be submitted to Congress by the end of the month to allow a vote on it before the end of the year; the letter-writers cited concerns that "passage of the USMCA as negotiated will become significantly more difficult" if it had to be approved through the incoming 116th Congress, in which there was a Democratic majority in the House of Representatives.

=== Gun laws ===
Portman has an "A" rating from the NRA Political Victory Fund (NRA-PVF), which has endorsed Portman in past elections. According to OpenSecrets, the NRA spent $3.06 million to support Portman between 1990 and 2018.

In 2019, Portman was one of 31 Republican senators to cosponsor the Constitutional Concealed Carry Reciprocity Act, a bill introduced by Senators John Cornyn and Ted Cruz that would allow persons concealed carry privileges in their home state to also carry concealed weapons in other states.

In 2022, Portman became one of ten Republican senators to support a bipartisan agreement on gun control, which included a red flag provision, a support for state crisis intervention orders, funding for school safety resources, stronger background checks for buyers under the age of 21, and penalties for straw purchases.

=== Healthcare ===
Portman has worked to repeal and replace the Affordable Care Act. In 2017, he voted to repeal it. He opposed steep cuts to Medicaid because the expansion of the program had allowed some Ohioans to gain coverage, including some impacted by Ohio's opioid crisis. As a member of a group of 13 Republican senators tasked with writing a Senate version of the AHCA, he supported proposed cuts to Medicaid that would be phased in over seven years.

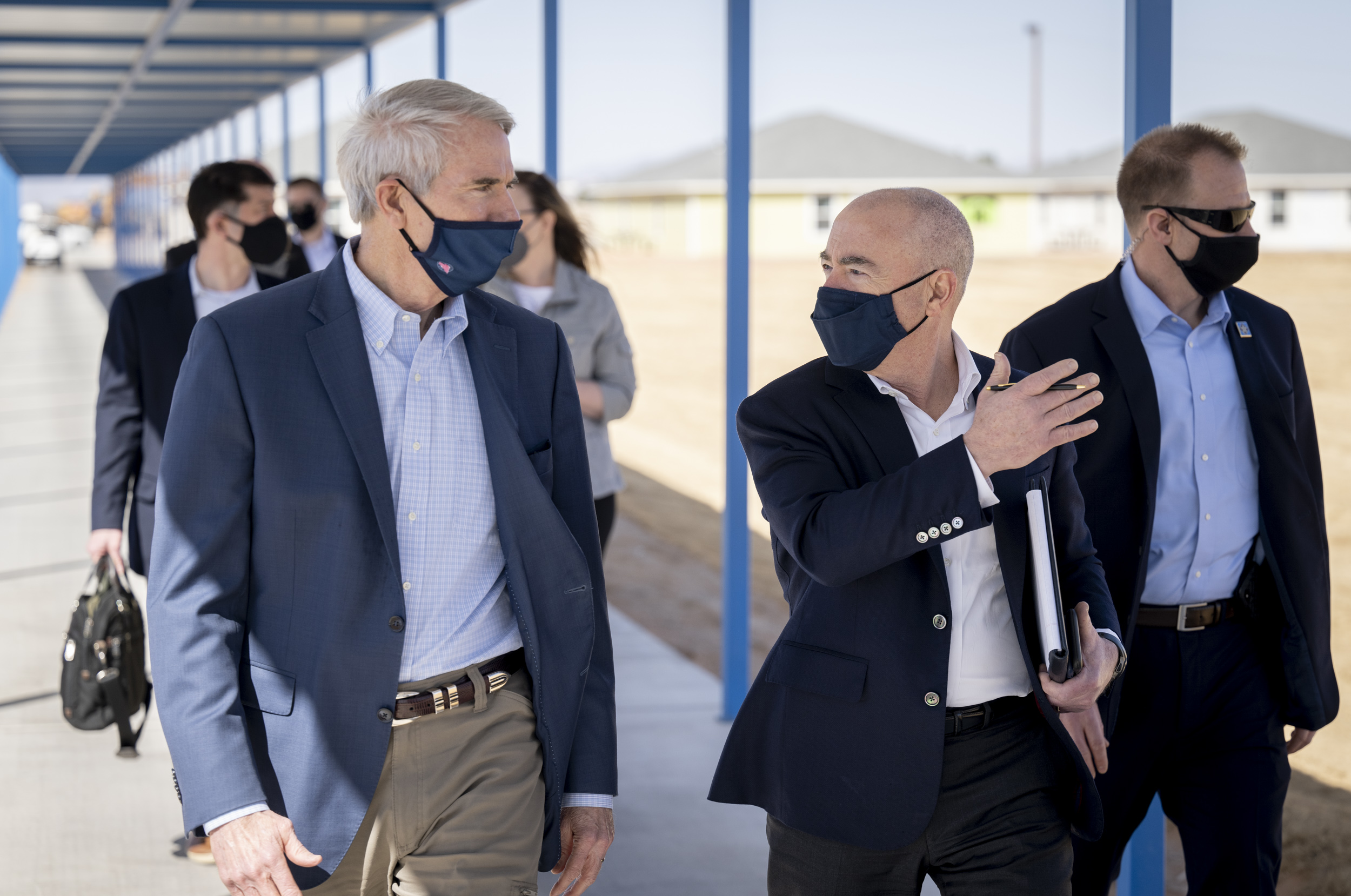
Portman and Homeland Security Secretary Alejandro Mayorkas tour the CHS Trail House, an Office of Refugee Resettlement facility that provides care for children before they are placed with a family member or sponsor.

=== Immigration ===
In June 2018, Portman was one of 13 Republican senators to sign a letter to Attorney General Jeff Sessions requesting a moratorium on the Trump administration family separation policy while Congress drafted legislation. In March 2019, he was one of a dozen Republicans who broke with their party, joining all Democrats, to vote for a resolution rejecting Trump's use of an emergency declaration to build a border wall. He later co-sponsored a bill to provide for congressional approval of national emergency declarations.

Portman opposed Trump's Muslim ban, saying the executive order was not "properly vetted" and that he supported the federal judges who blocked its implementation.

=== Jobs ===
In 2014, Portman voted against reauthorizing long-term unemployment benefits to 1.7 million jobless Americans. He expressed concern about the inclusion of a provision in the bill that would allow companies to make smaller contributions to employee pension funds. In April 2014 Portman voted to extend federal funding for unemployment benefits. Federal funding had been initiated in 2008 and expired at the end of 2013.

In 2014, Portman opposed the Minimum Wage Fairness Act, a bill to phase in, over two years, an increase in the federal minimum wage to $10.10 per hour. The bill was strongly supported by President Barack Obama and congressional Democrats, but strongly opposed by congressional Republicans.

In 2015, Portman voted for an amendment to establish a deficit-neutral reserve fund to allow employees to earn paid sick time.

=== Judiciary ===
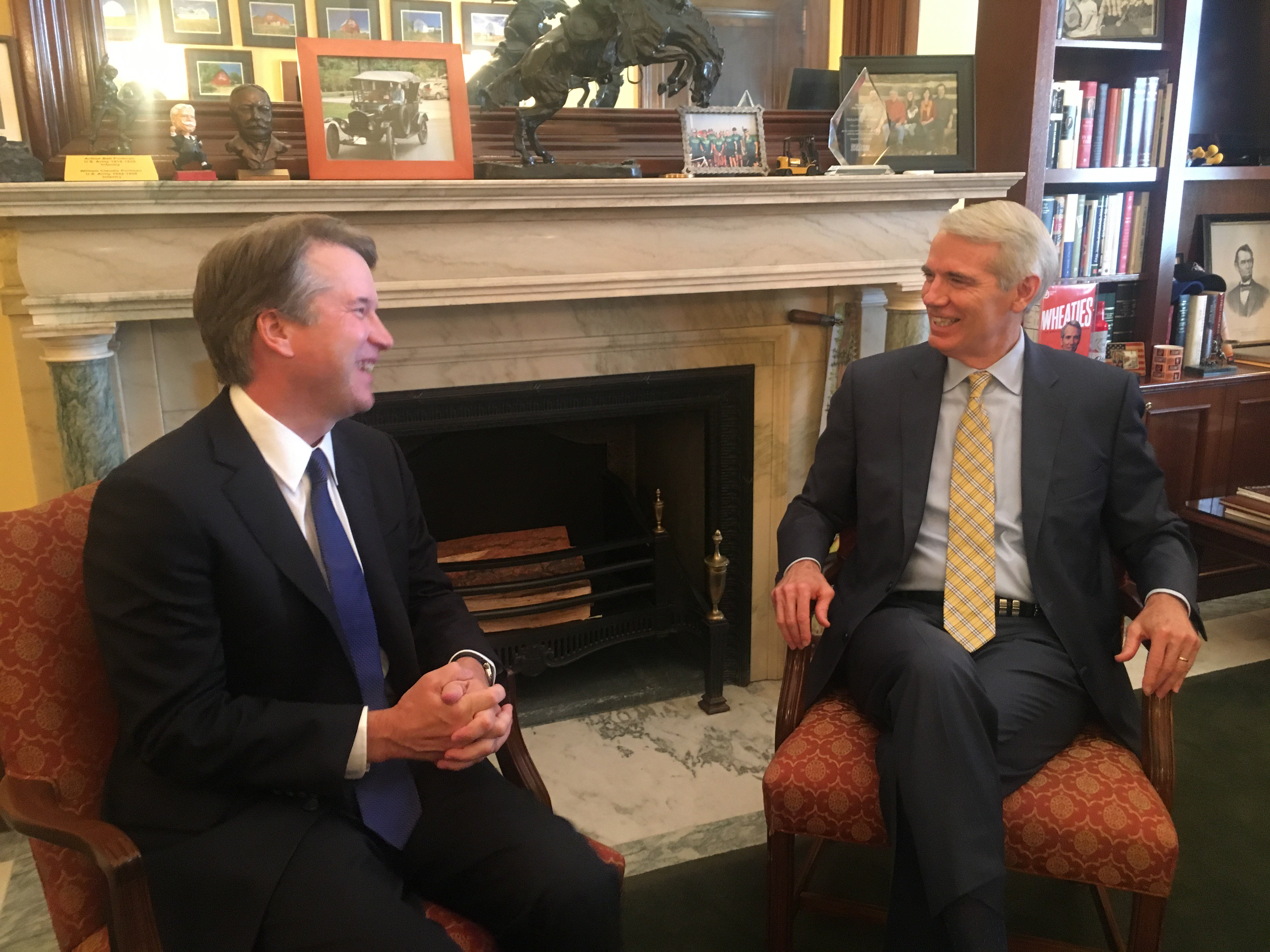
Portman and Brett Kavanaugh in July 2018

In September 2018, Portman said he would support Trump's nomination of Brett Kavanaugh to the Supreme Court, saying, "The Brett Kavanaugh I know is a man of integrity and humility". Portman did not call for an investigation by the FBI for sexual assault allegations.

In September 2020, Portman supported a vote on Trump's nominee to fill the U.S. Supreme Court vacancy left by the death of Ruth Bader Ginsburg less than six weeks before the 2020 presidential election. In April 2016, Portman said that Obama's nominee to the Supreme Court, who was nominated eight months before the election, should not be considered by the Senate, as it was "a very partisan year and a presidential election year ... it's better to have this occur after we're past this presidential election."

=== Human trafficking ===
Portman has been involved in efforts to end human trafficking. As a member of the Permanent Subcommittee on Investigations, he began investigating sex trafficking in 2015. The investigation found that classified advertising website Backpage was aware that the website was being used to sell young girls for sex. Portman sponsored the Stop Enabling Sex Traffickers Act, which clarified sex trafficking laws to make it illegal to knowingly assist, facilitate, or support sex trafficking. SESTA was passed by Congress and signed into law by Trump in April 2018.

== Electoral history ==
2010 Ohio U.S. Senator Republican primary results
Party	Candidate	Votes	%
Republican	Rob Portman	667,369	100.00%
Total votes		667,369	100.00%

United States Senate election in Ohio, 2010
Party	Candidate	Votes	%	±%
Republican	Rob Portman	2,168,742	56.85%	−6.61%
Democratic	Lee Fisher	1,503,297	39.40%	+2.85%
Constitution	Eric Deaton	65,856	1.72%	N/A
Independent	Michael Pryce	50,101	1.31%	N/A
Socialist	Daniel LaBotz	26,454	0.69%	N/A
write-in	Arthur Sullivan	648	0.02%	N/A
Majority		665,445	17.44%	
Total votes		3,815,098	100.00%	
Republican hold				

2016 Ohio U.S. Senator Republican primary results
Party	Candidate	Votes	%
Republican	Rob Portman (incumbent)	1,336,686	82.16%
Republican	Don Eckhart	290,268	17.84%
Total votes		1,626,954	100.00%

United States Senate election in Ohio, 2016
Party	Candidate	Votes	%	±%
Republican	Rob Portman (incumbent)	3,118,567	58.03%	+1.18%
Democratic	Ted Strickland	1,996,908	37.16%	−2.24%
Independent	Tom Connors	93,041	1.73%	N/A
Green	Joseph R. DeMare	88,246	1.64%	N/A
Independent	Scott Rupert	77,291	1.44%	N/A
write-in	James Stahl	111	0.00%	N/A
Total votes		5,374,164	100.0%	N/A
Republican hold				

== Personal life ==
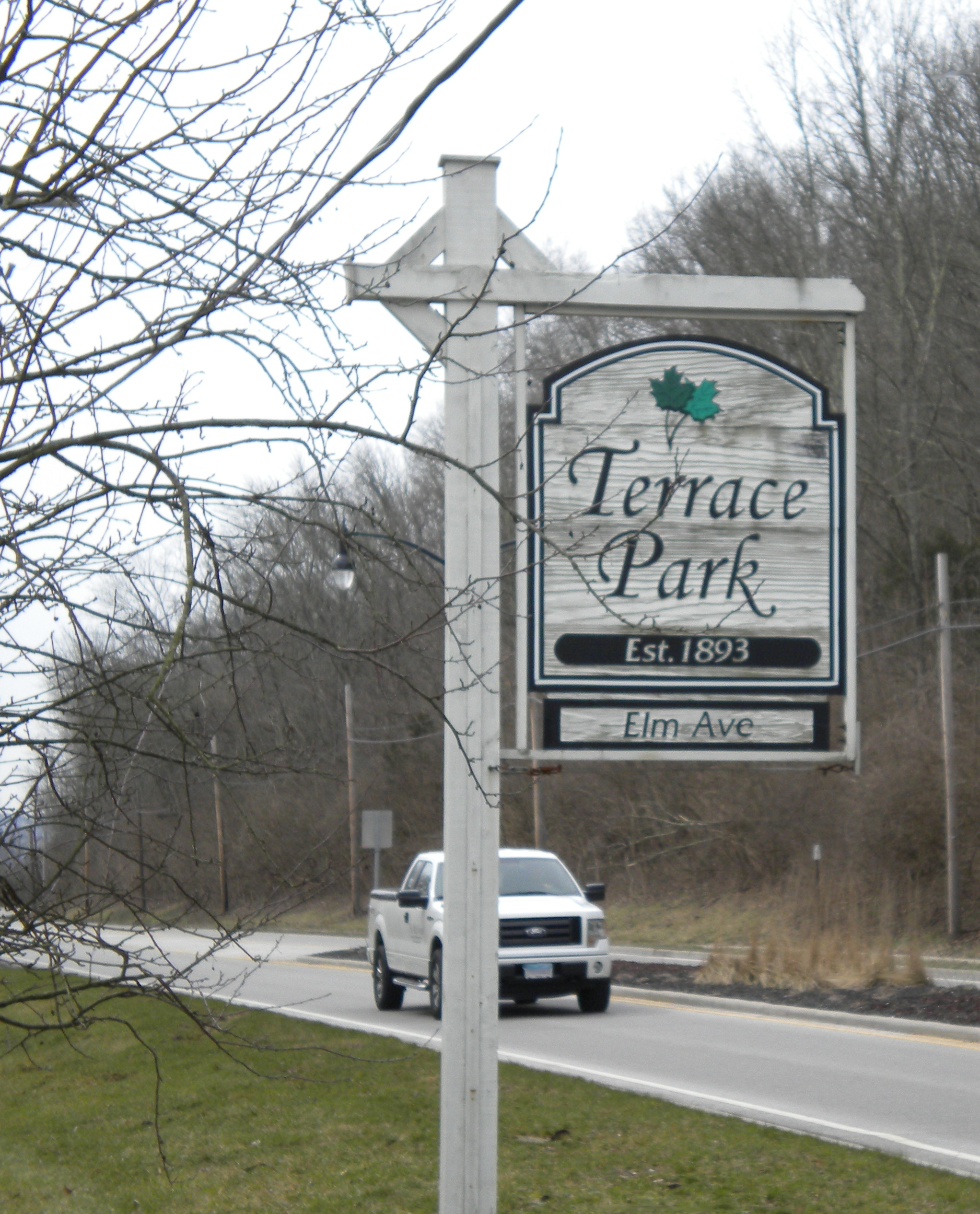
Throughout his career, Portman and his family have resided in Terrace Park, Ohio.

Portman married Jane Dudley in July 1986. Dudley, who previously worked for Democratic Congressman Tom Daschle, "agreed to become a Republican when her husband agreed to become a Methodist." The Portmans attend church services at Hyde Park Community United Methodist Church. The Portmans have three children. Portman still owns the Golden Lamb Inn with his brother Wym Portman and sister Ginna Portman Amis. In 2004, a Dutch conglomerate purchased the Portman Equipment Company. Portman had researched the firm's local acquisitions, stating "It's a concept I've heard described as 'Glocalism.' All these companies are trying to achieve economies of scale. This lets us develop a network and coverage globally. But you can still have the local spirit, the local name and the customer intimacy to accomplish great things." A July 2012 article about Portman stated that in 40 years, his only citation has been a traffic ticket for an improper turn while driving. Portman is an avid kayaker, is fluent in Spanish, and enjoys bike rides.

In December 2004, Portman and Cheryl Bauer published a book on the 19th-century Shaker community at Union Village, in Turtlecreek Township, Warren County, Ohio. The book was titled Wisdom's Paradise: The Forgotten Shakers of Union Village.

== Awards and honors ==
On August 23, 2022, Ukrainian President Volodymyr Zelenskyy awarded Portman the Order of Merit, first class, "For significant personal merits in strengthening interstate cooperation, support of state sovereignty and territorial integrity of Ukraine, and significant contribution to the popularization of the Ukrainian state in the world." The Ukrainian Congress Committee of America (UCCA) honored Portman with several awards during his Senate tenure, including the Friend of UNIS Ukrainian Democracy Award in 2014, the Sevchenko Freedom Award in 2016, and the Lifetime Achievement Award in 2022. In 2022, he received the Star of Ukraine Award from the U.S.-Ukraine Foundation and the Appreciation Award from the United Ukrainian Organizations of Ohio.

Year Received	Award	Organization
2013	Special Congressional Appreciation Award	Small Business Council of America
2013, 2014, 2015, 2016, 2018	Hero of Main Street	National Retail Federation (NRF)
2014	Margaret Mead Award	International Community Corrections Association (ICCA)
2014	ABA Justice Award	American Bar Association
2015	Everyday Freedom Hero	National Underground Railroad Freedom Center
2015	President's Partnering for Quality Award	Ohio Association of County Behavioral Health Authorities
2015	Bruce F. Vento Public Service Award	National Park Trust
2015	Distinguished Service Award	Tax Foundation
2016	Ohio Liberator Award	Save our Adolescents from Prostitution (S.O.A.P.)
2016	Major General Charles Dick Award for Legislation Excellence	National Guard Association of the United States
2017	Jefferson-Lincoln Award	Panetta Institute for Public Policy
2017	Spirit of Enterprise Award	U.S. Chamber of Commerce
2018	Congressional Award	American Association of Retired Persons (AARP)
2021	Champion of Retirement Security Award	Insured Retirement Institute
2022	Ohio History Leadership Award	Ohio History Connection
2022	National Order, Gran Cruz (Great Cross)	Embassy of Colombia
2022	Rob Portman Public Service Leadership Award	Cincinnati USA Regional Chamber
2022	Lifetime Achievement Award	Association for Career and Technical Education (ACTE)
2024	Honorary Officer of the Order of the British Empire	United Kingdom Government

=== Foreign award during fight against military aggression ===
- Ukraine
  - Honorary Diploma of the Verkhovna Rada of Ukraine (2024) – Awarded by Ukrainian Parliament; presented by Ruslan Stefanchuk, Chairman of the Verkhovna Rada.

== Notes ==
- Barone, Michael; Ujifusa, Grant (1993). The Almanac of American Politics, 1994. Washington DC: National Journal. ISBN 0-89234-058-4.
- Barone, Michael; Ujifusa, Grant (1997). The Almanac of American Politics, 1998. Washington DC: National Journal. ISBN 0-89234-080-0.
- Michael Barone, Richard E. Cohen, and Grant Ujifusa. The Almanac of American Politics, 2002. Washington, D.C.: National Journal, 2001. ISBN 0-89234-099-1
- "CQ Almanac 1993". Congressional Quarterly Almanac, 49th Edition, 103rd Congress, 1st Session. Washington, D.C.: CQ Press. 1994. ISBN 1-56802-020-1.
- "Politics in America, 1992: The 102nd Congress". Congressional Quarterly. Washington, D.C.: CQ Press. 1991. ISBN 0-87187-599-3.

Political offices
Preceded by Gordon Wheeler	White House Director of Legislative Affairs; 1989–1991	Succeeded by Stephen Hart
Preceded by Robert Zoellick	United States Trade Representative; 2005–2006	Succeeded by Susan Schwab
Preceded by Joshua Bolten	Director of the Office of Management and Budget; 2006–2007	Succeeded by Jim Nussle
U.S. House of Representatives
Preceded by Bill Gradison	Member of the U.S. House of Representatives from Ohio's 2nd congressional district 1993–2005	Succeeded by Jean Schmidt
Party political offices
Vacant Title last held by Bill Paxon; 1997	Chair of House Republican Leadership; 2001–2005	Vacant Title next held by Greg Walden; 2010
Preceded by George Voinovich	Republican nominee for U.S. Senator from Ohio (Class 3); 2010, 2016	Succeeded by JD Vance
U.S. Senate
Preceded by George Voinovich	U.S. Senator (Class 3) from Ohio; 2011–2023; Served alongside: Sherrod Brown	Succeeded by JD Vance
Preceded by Gary Peters	Ranking Member of the Senate Homeland Security Committee; 2021–2023	Succeeded by Rand Paul
U.S. order of precedence (ceremonial)
Preceded by Bob Corker as Former U.S. Senator	Order of precedence of the United States as Former U.S. Senator	Succeeded by David Vitter as Former U.S. Senator
