= 2012 United States House of Representatives elections in Ohio =

- November 6, 2012

All 16 Ohio seats to the United States House of Representatives
| | Majority party | Minority party |
|---|---|---|
| Party | Republican | Democratic |
| Last election | 13 | 5 |
| Seats won | 12 | 4 |
| Seat change | ▼1 | ▼1 |
| Popular vote | 2,620,233 | 2,412,385 |
| Percentage | 50.96% | 46.91% |
| Swing | ▼2.71% | ▲4.79% |

Republican
40–50%
50–60%
60–70%
70–80%
80–90%
90>%
Democratic
40–50%
50–60%
60–70%
70–80%
90>%

The 2012 United States House of Representatives elections in Ohio were held on Tuesday, November 6, 2012, to elect the 16 U.S. representatives from the state of Ohio, a loss of two seats following the 2010 United States census. The elections coincided with the elections of other federal and state offices, including a quadrennial presidential election and an election to the U.S. Senate.

== Overview ==
=== Statewide ===
| Party | Candidates | Votes | | Seats | | |
| Party | Candidates | No. | % | No. | +/– | % |
|---|---|---|---|---|---|---|
| Republican | 15 | 2,620,233 | 50.96 | 12 | ▼1 | 75.00 |
| Democratic | 15 | 2,412,385 | 46.91 | 4 | ▼1 | 25.00 |
| Libertarian | 7 | 81,469 | 1.58 | 0 | Steady | 0.00 |
| Green | 3 | 26,070 | 0.51 | 0 | Steady | 0.00 |
| Write-in | 5 | 1,969 | 0.04 | 0 | Steady | 0.00 |
| Total | 45 | 5,142,126 | 100.0 | 16 | ▼2 | 100.0 |

Popular vote
| Republican | 50.96% |
| Democratic | 46.91% |
| Other | 2.13% |

House seats
| Republican | 75.00% |
| Democratic | 25.00% |

=== District ===
Results of the 2012 United States House of Representatives elections in Ohio by district:

| District | Republican | | Democratic | | Others | | Total | | Result |
| District | Votes | % | Votes | % | Votes | % | Votes | % | Result |
|---|---|---|---|---|---|---|---|---|---|
| District 1 | 201,907 | 57.73% | 131,490 | 37.60% | 16,319 | 4.67% | 349,716 | 100.00% | Republican hold |
| District 2 | 194,296 | 58.63% | 137,077 | 41.37% | 0 | 0.00% | 331,373 | 100.00% | Republican hold |
| District 3 | 77,901 | 26.35% | 201,897 | 68.29% | 15,855 | 5.36% | 295,652 | 100.00% | Democratic gain |
| District 4 | 182,643 | 58.35% | 114,214 | 36.49% | 16,141 | 5.16% | 312,998 | 100.00% | Republican hold |
| District 5 | 201,514 | 57.27% | 137,806 | 39.16% | 12,558 | 3.57% | 351,878 | 100.00% | Republican hold |
| District 6 | 164,536 | 53.25% | 144,444 | 46.75% | 0 | 0.00% | 308,980 | 100.00% | Republican hold |
| District 7 | 178,104 | 56.40% | 137,708 | 43.60% | 0 | 0.00% | 315,812 | 100.00% | Republican hold |
| District 8 | 246,378 | 99.88% | 0 | 0.00% | 1,938 | 0.12% | 248,316 | 100.00% | Republican hold |
| District 9 | 68,668 | 23.03% | 217,771 | 73.04% | 11,725 | 3.93% | 298,164 | 100.00% | Democratic hold |
| District 10 | 208,201 | 59.54% | 131,097 | 37.49% | 10,373 | 2.97% | 349,671 | 100.00% | Republican hold |
| District 11 | 0 | 0.00% | 258,359 | 100.00% | 0 | 0.00% | 258,359 | 100.00% | Democratic hold |
| District 12 | 233,869 | 63.47% | 134,605 | 36.53% | 0 | 0.00% | 368,474 | 100.00% | Republican hold |
| District 13 | 88,120 | 27.23% | 235,492 | 72.77% | 0 | 0.00% | 323,612 | 100.00% | Democratic hold |
| District 14 | 183,657 | 54.03% | 131,637 | 38.73% | 24,602 | 7.24% | 339,894 | 100.00% | Republican hold |
| District 15 | 205,274 | 61.56% | 128,188 | 38.44% | 0 | 0.00% | 333,462 | 100.00% | Republican hold |
| District 16 | 185,165 | 52.05% | 170,600 | 47.95% | 0 | 0.00% | 355,765 | 100.00% | Republican hold |
| Total | 2,620,233 | 50.96% | 2,412,385 | 46.91% | | 2.13% | 5,142,126 | 100.00% | |

== Redistricting ==
The redistricting process was formally begun by a legislative panel on June 16, 2011. A proposal released in September 2011 would create 12 districts favoring Republicans and four favoring Democrats. In the proposal, one district which favored Republicans would be effectively eliminated, and the homes of six of the state's incumbents would be drawn into districts also containing the homes of other incumbents. The map was passed by the Ohio House of Representatives on September 15 and by the Ohio Senate on September 21. The bill passed by the Senate included an appropriations provision intended to prevent the bill from being placed on the 2012 ballot by petition and was passed again by the House the same day. Governor John Kasich signed the bill into law on September 26.

On September 28, the Ohio Democratic Party had filed suit in the Ohio Supreme Court, seeking a ruling on the legality of the Senate's addition of an appropriations provision. On October 14, the Supreme Court ruled that a referendum on the map could go ahead. Ohioans for Fair Districts, the group calling for a referendum, asked the court to restart the 90-day time limit for the collection of signatures, a request the court declined, meaning the 90-day period would begin on September 26 rather than October 14. Chris Redfern, the chair of the Ohio Democratic Party, vowed to collect enough signatures to place the map on the ballot.

If the map had received 66 votes in the House of Representatives, an emergency clause preventing a referendum from being held would have been invoked. As a result, in October 2011 Republicans sought the support of African American Democrats for an alternative map. Later that month members of the Ohio Legislative Black Caucus met with Redfern, indicating they would not immediately seek to compromise with Republicans; however on October 31 Bob Bennett, the former chair of the Ohio Republican Party appointed by House Speaker William G. Batchelder to negotiate an alternative map, said he thought the two parties were close to reaching an agreement.

On November 3, Batchelder brought a slightly modified map to the floor of the House of Representatives. However, the House fell eight votes short of the 66 needed to bring the map up for a vote without a committee hearing having been held.

Later in November, Ohio Democratic Party communications director Seth Bringman said the referendum effort had surpassed 100,000 signatures and aimed to have collected the over 230,000 signatures necessary by December 23. However, a lack of funds prevented Ohioans for Fair Districts from hiring professional signature gatherers and necessitated the exclusive use of volunteers. Redfern said in December 2011 that Democrats might return to the Supreme Court to request that it reconsider its decision on the 90-day time limit. If the signature-gathering effort had failed, an amendment to the Ohio Constitution requiring compact and competitive districts could have been sought. If the Democratic Party failed to collect enough signatures, the original map would have taken effect on Christmas Day 2011.

On December 14, 2011, the House of Representatives and Senate both passed a new map, effectively resolving the situation.

== District 1 ==
2012 Ohio's 1st congressional district election
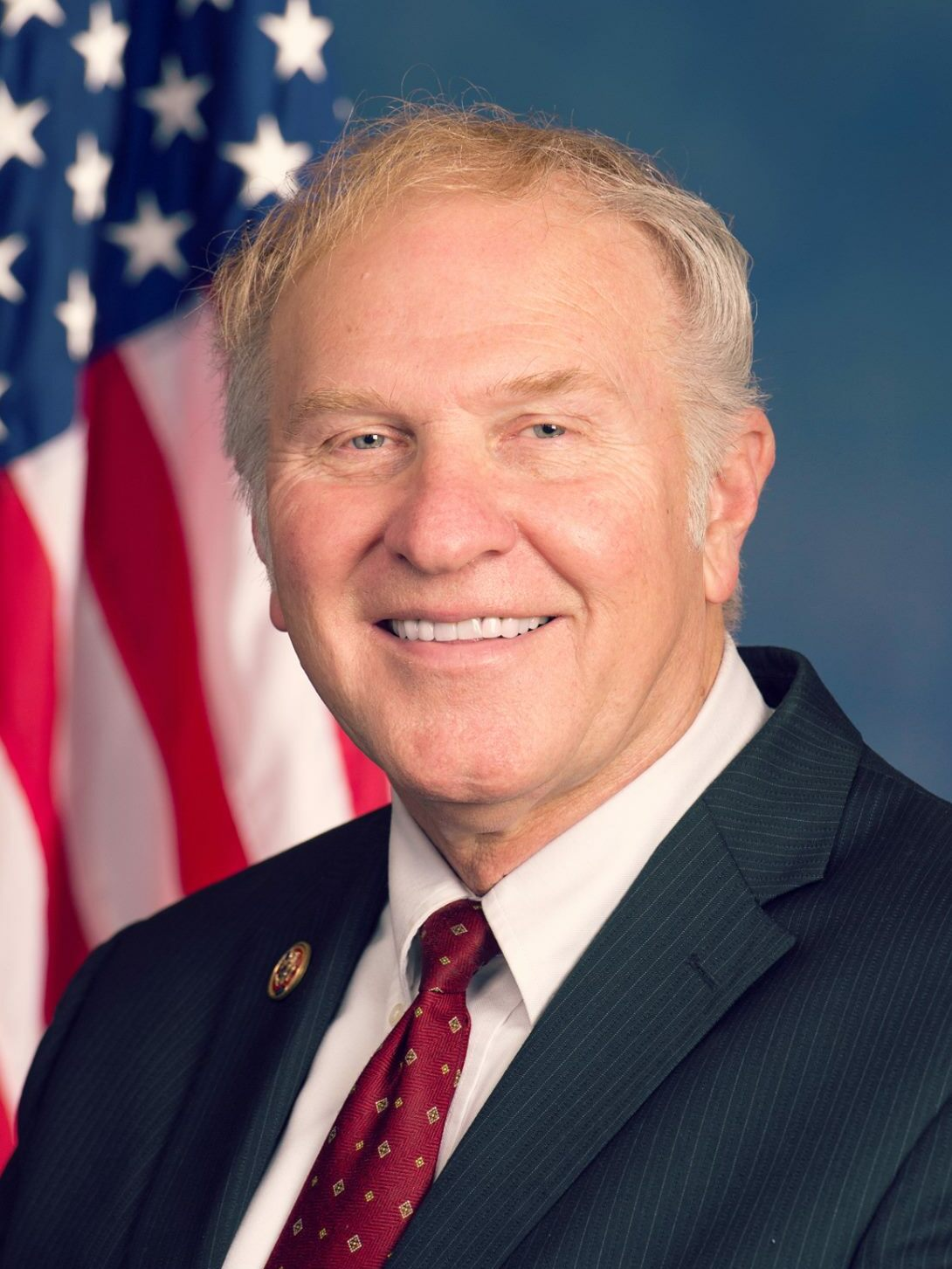

| Candidate | Steve Chabot | Jeff Sinnard |
| Party | Republican | Democratic |
| Popular vote | 201,907 | 131,490 |
| Percentage | 57.7% | 37.6% |
- County results Chabot: 50–60% 70–80%
U.S. Representative before election
Steve Chabot
Republican
Elected U.S. Representative
Steve Chabot
Republican

Ohio's 1st congressional district is based in Cincinnati, stretching southwestward to Ohio's borders with Kentucky and Indiana. After redistricting, it lost parts of Hamilton County and gained strongly republican Warren Country. This turned it from a district that was 1 percentage point more Democratic than the national average, to one that was 6 percentage points more Republican than the national average. It had been represented by Republican Steve Chabot, who previously served from 1995 until 2009, since January 2011. He sought re-election in 2012.

=== Republican primary ===
==== Candidates ====
===== Nominee =====
- Steve Chabot, incumbent U.S. representative

==== Primary results ====
Republican primary results
| Party | Candidate | Votes | % |
|---|---|---|---|
| Republican | Steve Chabot (incumbent) | 57,496 | 100.0 |

=== Democratic primary ===
==== Candidates ====
===== Nominee =====
- Jeff Sinnard, engineering consultant and candidate for Ohio's 2nd congressional district in 2005 and 2006

===== Eliminated in primary =====
- Malcolm Kantzler, businessman

===== Withdrew =====
- Eric Wilson

===== Declined =====
- Steve Driehaus, former U.S. representative
- Mark Mallory, mayor of Cincinnati
- Connie Pillich, state representative

==== Primary results ====
Democratic primary results
| Party | Candidate | Votes | % |
|---|---|---|---|
| Democratic | Jeff Sinnard | 4,561 | 50.3 |
| Democratic | Malcom Kantzler | 4,505 | 49.7 |
| Total votes | | 9,066 | 100.0 |

Jeff Sinnard defeated Malcolm Kantzler by a scant 56 votes for the Democratic nomination (the reference footnote provides only the unofficial, election night final tally).

=== Libertarian primary ===
==== Candidates ====
===== Nominee =====
- Jim Berns, former chair of Hamilton County Libertarian Party and nominee for this district in 2010

===== Eliminated in primary =====
- Queen Noble, business owner

==== Primary results ====
Libertarian primary results
| Party | Candidate | Votes | % |
|---|---|---|---|
| Libertarian | Jim Berns | 140 | 87.0 |
| Libertarian | Sandra Queen Noble | 21 | 13.0 |
| Total votes | | 161 | 100.0 |

=== Green primary ===
==== Candidates ====
===== Nominee =====
- Rich Stevenson, political writer, activist and nominee for this district in 2010

==== Primary results ====
Green primary results
| Party | Candidate | Votes | % |
|---|---|---|---|
| Green | Rich Stevenson | 93 | 100.0 |

=== General election ===
==== Campaign ====
The Sinnard campaign was criticized for its lack of active campaigning and for not even having a campaign website. Sinnard subsequently admitted he was just doing the party a favor by putting his name on the ballot.

==== Endorsements ====
Steve Chabot (R)

Organizations

- Campaign for Working Families
- National Right to Life Committee
- NRA Political Victory Fund
- Ohio Right to Life
- United States Chamber of Commerce
Jeff Sinnard (D)

Labor unions

- National Education Association
Did not endorse

Newspapers

- Cincinnati CityBeat

==== Predictions ====
| Source | Ranking | As of |
|---|---|---|
| The Cook Political Report | Safe R | November 5, 2012 |
| Rothenberg | Safe R | November 2, 2012 |
| Roll Call | Safe R | November 4, 2012 |
| Sabato's Crystal Ball | Safe R | November 5, 2012 |
| NY Times | Safe R | November 4, 2012 |
| RCP | Safe R | November 4, 2012 |
| The Hill | Safe R | November 4, 2012 |

==== Results ====
Ohio's 1st congressional district, 2012
| Party | Candidate | Votes | % |
|---|---|---|---|
| Republican | Steve Chabot (incumbent) | 201,907 | 57.7 |
| Democratic | Jeff Sinnard | 131,490 | 37.6 |
| Libertarian | Jim Berns | 9,674 | 2.8 |
| Green | Rich Stevenson | 6,645 | 1.9 |
| Total votes | | 349,716 | 100.0 |
| Republican hold | | | |

== District 2 ==
2012 Ohio's 2nd congressional district election
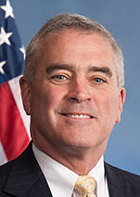

| | Majority party | Minority party |
|---|---|---|
| Candidate | Brad Wenstrup | William Smith |
| Party | Republican | Democratic |
| Popular vote | 194,296 | 137,077 |
| Percentage | 58.63% | 41.37% |
- County results Wenstrup: 50–60% 60–70% 70–80% Smith: 50–60%
U.S. Representative before election
Jean Schmidt
Republican
Elected U.S. Representative
Brad Wenstrup
Republican

Republican Jean Schmidt had represented Ohio's 2nd congressional district since 2005.

=== Republican primary ===
==== Candidates ====
===== Nominee =====
- Brad Wenstrup, podiatrist, U.S. Army veteran and candidate for mayor of Cincinnati in 2009

===== Eliminated in primary =====
- Tony Brush, businessman
- Fred Kundrata, Air Force veteran
- Jean Schmidt, incumbent U.S. representative

===== Disqualified =====
- Joe Green, businessman (ran as a write-in candidate)

==== Primary results ====
2012 Republican primary results by county Wenstrup: 50–60%; Schmidt: 40–50%; 50–60%; 60–70%

Republican primary results
| Party | Candidate | Votes | % |
|---|---|---|---|
| Republican | Brad Wenstrup | 42,482 | 48.7 |
| Republican | Jean Schmidt (incumbent) | 37,383 | 43.0 |
| Republican | Tony Brush | 4,275 | 4.9 |
| Republican | Fred Kundrata | 2,999 | 3.4 |
| Republican | Joe Green (write-in) | 29 | 0.0 |
| Total votes | | 87,168 | 100.0 |

Wenstrup upset Schmidt to win the nomination.

=== Democratic primary ===
==== Candidates ====
===== Nominee =====
- William R. Smith, truck driver

===== Eliminated in primary =====
- David Krikorian, businessman and candidate for this seat in 2008 and 2010

===== Declined =====
- Connie Pillich, state representative

==== Primary results ====
Democratic primary results
| Party | Candidate | Votes | % |
|---|---|---|---|
| Democratic | William R. Smith | 10,175 | 50.1 |
| Democratic | David Krikorian | 10,114 | 49.9 |
| Total votes | | 20,289 | 100.0 |

Krikorian said in October 2011 that if he did not receive the support of the Democratic Party, he would run as an independent candidate, but he did not.

=== General election ===
==== Endorsements ====
Brad Wenstrup (R)

Organizations

- NRA Political Victory Fund
- Ohio Right to Life

==== Predictions ====
| Source | Ranking | As of |
|---|---|---|
| The Cook Political Report | Safe R | November 5, 2012 |
| Rothenberg | Safe R | November 2, 2012 |
| Roll Call | Safe R | November 4, 2012 |
| Sabato's Crystal Ball | Safe R | November 5, 2012 |
| NY Times | Safe R | November 4, 2012 |
| RCP | Safe R | November 4, 2012 |
| The Hill | Safe R | November 4, 2012 |

==== Results ====
Ohio's 2nd congressional district, 2012
| Party | Candidate | Votes | % |
|---|---|---|---|
| Republican | Brad Wenstrup | 194,296 | 58.6 |
| Democratic | William Smith | 137,077 | 41.4 |
| Total votes | | 331,373 | 100.0 |
| Republican hold | | | |

== District 3 ==
2012 Ohio's 3rd congressional district election
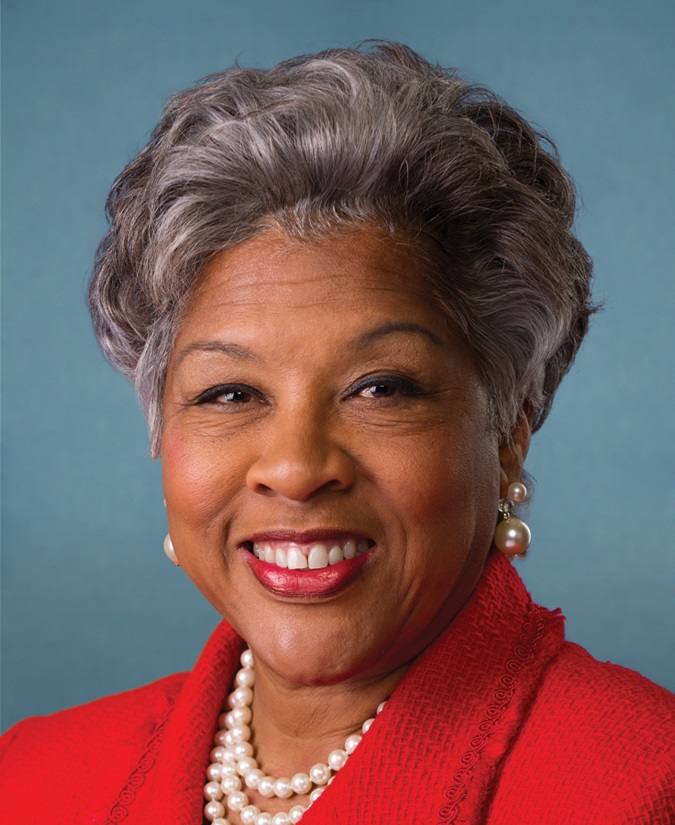

| Nominee | Joyce Beatty | Chris Long |
| Party | Democratic | Republican |
| Popular vote | 201,921 | 77,903 |
| Percentage | 68.29% | 26.35% |
- County results Beatty: 60–70%
U.S. Representative before election
None
(new seat)
Elected U.S. Representative
Joyce Beatty
Democratic

The new 3rd district is based in Columbus. Redistricting placed most of the heavily Democratic portions of Columbus into the 3rd, with much of the rest of Columbus split into the more Republican 12th and 15th districts.

=== Democratic primary ===
==== Candidates ====
===== Nominee =====
- Joyce Beatty, vice president of Ohio State University and former minority leader of the Ohio House of Representatives

===== Eliminated in primary =====
- Ted Celeste, state representative
- Mary Jo Kilroy, former U.S. representative
- Priscilla R. Tyson, Columbus city council member

===== Declined =====
- Kevin Boyce, former state treasurer
- Paula Brooks, member of Franklin County Board of Commissioners, nominee for the 12th district in 2010
- Jennifer Brunner, former Ohio secretary of state
- John Patrick Carney, state representative
- Michael Coleman, mayor of Columbus
- Nancy Garland, state representative
- Andrew Ginther, president of the Columbus City Council
- Zach Klein, member of the Columbus City Council
- John O'Grady, Franklin County commissioner
- Charleta Tavares, state senator

==== Primary results ====
Democratic primary results
| Party | Candidate | Votes | % |
|---|---|---|---|
| Democratic | Joyce Beatty | 15,848 | 38.3 |
| Democratic | Mary Jo Kilroy | 14,369 | 34.8 |
| Democratic | Priscilla Tyson | 6,244 | 15.1 |
| Democratic | Ted Celeste | 4,895 | 11.8 |
| Total votes | | 41,356 | 100.0 |

=== Republican primary ===
==== Candidates ====
===== Nominee =====
- Chris Long, member of the Reynoldsburg city council

===== Eliminated in primary =====
- John Adams, manufacturing company owner

==== Primary results ====
Republican primary results
| Party | Candidate | Votes | % |
|---|---|---|---|
| Republican | Chris Long | 16,711 | 57.5 |
| Republican | John Adams | 12,335 | 42.5 |
| Total votes | | 29,046 | 100.0 |

=== Libertarian primary ===
==== Candidates ====
===== Nominee =====
- Richard Ehrbar

==== Primary results ====
Libertarian primary results
| Party | Candidate | Votes | % |
|---|---|---|---|
| Libertarian | Richard Ehrbar | 674 | 100.0 |

=== Green primary ===
==== Candidates ====
===== Nominee =====
- Bob Fitrakis, professor

==== Primary results ====
Green primary results
| Party | Candidate | Votes | % |
|---|---|---|---|
| Green | Bob Fitrakis | 182 | 100.0 |

=== General election ===
==== Endorsements ====
Joyce Beatty (D)

Labor unions

- AFL-CIO
- International Brotherhood of Boilermakers
- National Association of Letter Carriers
- National Education Association
- United Steelworkers

Organizations

- Democratic Congressional Campaign Committee "Majority Makers" Program
- EMILY's List
- Equality Ohio
- Feminist Majority
- Human Rights Campaign
- National Organization for Women
- Planned Parenthood Action Fund
- Stonewall Democrats
Chris Long (R)

Organizations

- Ohio Right to Life

==== Predictions ====
| Source | Ranking | As of |
|---|---|---|
| The Cook Political Report | Safe D | November 5, 2012 |
| Rothenberg | Safe D | November 2, 2012 |
| Roll Call | Safe D | November 4, 2012 |
| Sabato's Crystal Ball | Safe D | November 5, 2012 |
| NY Times | Safe D | November 4, 2012 |
| RCP | Safe D | November 4, 2012 |
| The Hill | Safe D | November 4, 2012 |

==== Results ====
Ohio's 3rd congressional district, 2012
| Party | Candidate | Votes | % |
|---|---|---|---|
| Democratic | Joyce Beatty | 201,897 | 68.3 |
| Republican | Chris Long | 77,901 | 26.3 |
| Libertarian | Richard Ehrbar | 9,462 | 3.2 |
| Green | Bob Fitrakis | 6,387 | 2.2 |
| Independent | Jeff Brown (write-in) | 5 | 0.0 |
| Total votes | | 295,652 | 100.0 |
| Democratic win (new seat) | | | |

== District 4 ==
2012 Ohio's 4th congressional district election
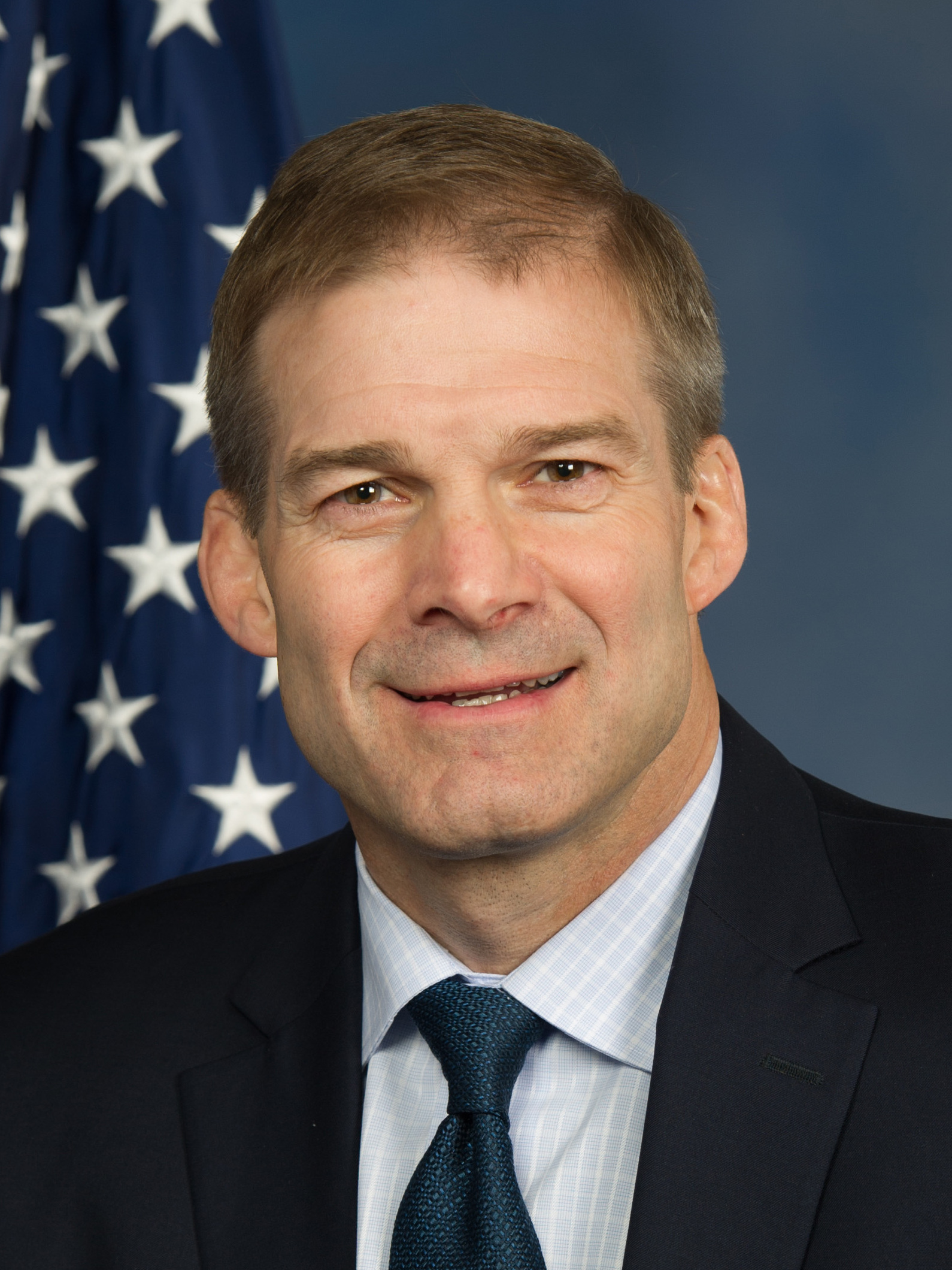

| Candidate | Jim Jordan | Jim Slone | Chris Kalla |
| Party | Republican | Democratic | Libertarian |
| Popular vote | 182,643 | 114,214 | 16,141 |
| Percentage | 58.3% | 36.5% | 5.2% |
- County results Jordan: 40–50% 50–60% 60–70% 70–80% Slone: 60–70%
U.S. Representative before election
Jim Jordan
Republican
Elected U.S. Representative
Jim Jordan
Republican

Republican Jim Jordan had represented Ohio's 4th congressional district since 2007. He sought re-election in 2012.

=== Republican primary ===
==== Candidates ====
===== Nominee =====
- Jim Jordan, incumbent U.S. representative

==== Primary results ====
Republican primary results
| Party | Candidate | Votes | % |
|---|---|---|---|
| Republican | Jim Jordan (incumbent) | 70,470 | 100.0 |

=== Democratic primary ===
==== Candidates ====
===== Nominee =====
- Jim Slone, former General Motors employee

==== Primary results ====
Democratic primary results
| Party | Candidate | Votes | % |
|---|---|---|---|
| Democratic | Jim Slone | 23,341 | 100.0 |

=== Libertarian primary ===
==== Candidates ====
===== Nominee =====
- Chris Kalla

==== Primary results ====
Libertarian primary results
| Party | Candidate | Votes | % |
|---|---|---|---|
| Libertarian | Chris Kalla | 25 | 100.0 |

=== General election ===
==== Endorsements ====
Jim Jordan (R)

Organizations

- Campaign for Working Families
- National Right to Life Committee
- NRA Political Victory Fund
- Ohio Right to Life
- United States Chamber of Commerce
Jim Slone (D)

Labor unions

- AFL-CIO
- International Brotherhood of Boilermakers
- National Education Association
- United Steelworkers

==== Predictions ====
| Source | Ranking | As of |
|---|---|---|
| The Cook Political Report | Safe R | November 5, 2012 |
| Rothenberg | Safe R | November 2, 2012 |
| Roll Call | Safe R | November 4, 2012 |
| Sabato's Crystal Ball | Safe R | November 5, 2012 |
| NY Times | Safe R | November 4, 2012 |
| RCP | Safe R | November 4, 2012 |
| The Hill | Safe R | November 4, 2012 |

==== Results ====
Ohio's 4th congressional district, 2012
| Party | Candidate | Votes | % |
|---|---|---|---|
| Republican | Jim Jordan (incumbent) | 182,643 | 58.3 |
| Democratic | Jim Slone | 114,214 | 36.5 |
| Libertarian | Chris Kalla | 16,141 | 5.2 |
| Total votes | | 312,998 | 100.0 |
| Republican hold | | | |

== District 5 ==
2012 Ohio's 5th congressional district election
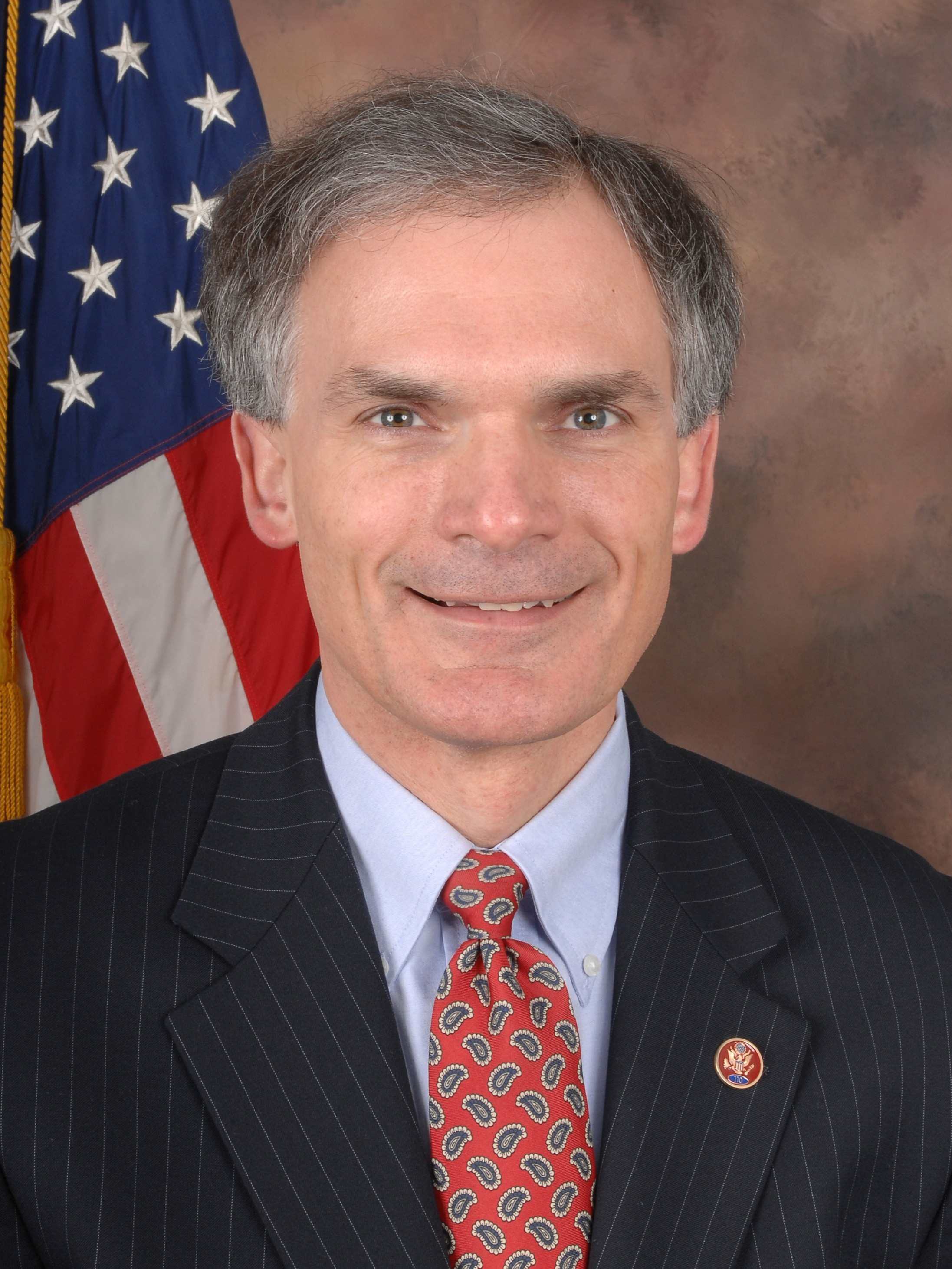

| Nominee | Bob Latta | Angela Zimmann |
| Party | Republican | Democratic |
| Popular vote | 201,514 | 137,806 |
| Percentage | 57.26% | 39.16% |
- County results Latta: 40–50% 50–60% 60–70% 70–80% Zimmann: 40–50%
U.S. Representative before election
Bob Latta
Republican
Elected U.S. Representative
Bob Latta
Republican

Republican Bob Latta, who had represented Ohio's 5th congressional district since 2007, sought re-election in 2012. He defeated Robert Wallis in the Republican primary.

=== Republican primary ===
==== Candidates ====
===== Nominee =====
- Bob Latta, incumbent U.S. representative

===== Eliminated in primary =====
- Robert Wallis, business owner and candidate for this seat in 2010

==== Primary results ====
Republican primary results
| Party | Candidate | Votes | % |
|---|---|---|---|
| Republican | Bob Latta (incumbent) | 76,477 | 82.6 |
| Republican | Robert Wallis | 16,135 | 17.4 |
| Total votes | | 92,612 | 100.0 |

=== Democratic primary ===
==== Candidates ====
===== Nominee =====
- Angela Zimmann, pastor and professor

==== Primary results ====
Democratic primary results
| Party | Candidate | Votes | % |
|---|---|---|---|
| Democratic | Angela Zimmann | 25,530 | 100.0 |

=== Libertarian primary ===
==== Candidates ====
===== Nominee =====
- Eric Eberly

==== Primary results ====
Libertarian primary results
| Party | Candidate | Votes | % |
|---|---|---|---|
| Libertarian | Eric Eberly | 338 | 100.0 |

=== General election ===
==== Endorsements ====
Bob Latta (R)

Organizations

- Campaign for Working Families
- National Right to Life Committee
- NRA Political Victory Fund
- Ohio Right to Life
- United States Chamber of Commerce
Angela Zimmann (D)

Labor unions

- AFL-CIO
- International Brotherhood of Boilermakers
- National Education Association
- United Steelworkers

Organizations

- Alliance for Retired Americans
- Democracy for America
- Planned Parenthood Action Fund
- Sierra Club

Newspapers

- Toledo Blade

==== Predictions ====
| Source | Ranking | As of |
|---|---|---|
| The Cook Political Report | Safe R | November 5, 2012 |
| Rothenberg | Safe R | November 2, 2012 |
| Roll Call | Safe R | November 4, 2012 |
| Sabato's Crystal Ball | Safe R | November 5, 2012 |
| NY Times | Safe R | November 4, 2012 |
| RCP | Safe R | November 4, 2012 |
| The Hill | Safe R | November 4, 2012 |

==== Results ====
Ohio's 5th congressional district, 2012
| Party | Candidate | Votes | % |
|---|---|---|---|
| Republican | Bob Latta (incumbent) | 201,514 | 57.3 |
| Democratic | Angela Zimmann | 137,806 | 39.2 |
| Libertarian | Eric Eberly | 12,558 | 3.5 |
| Total votes | | 351,878 | 100.0 |
| Republican hold | | | |

== District 6 ==
2012 Ohio's 6th congressional district election
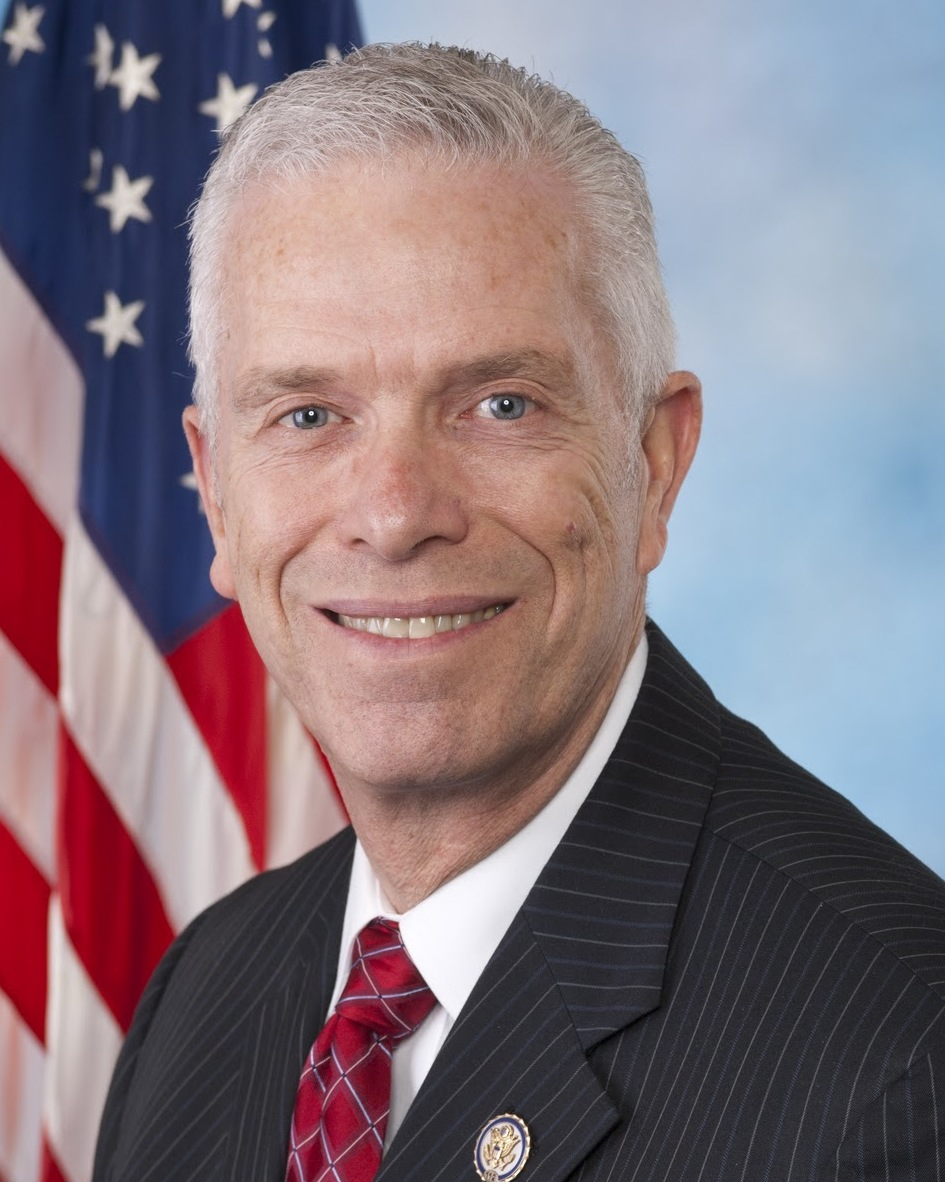

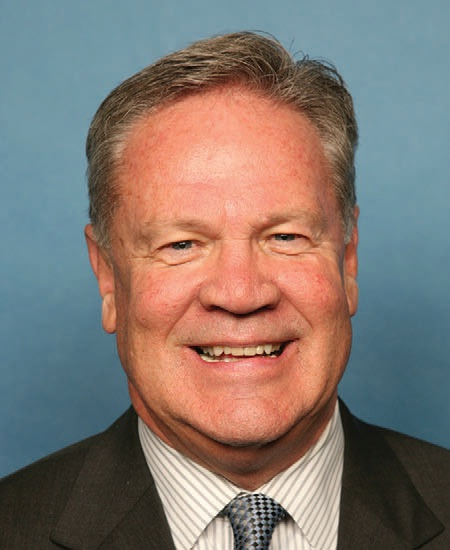
| Nominee | Bill Johnson | Charlie Wilson |
| Party | Republican | Democratic |
| Popular vote | 164,536 | 144,444 |
| Percentage | 53.2% | 46.8% |
- County results Johnson: 50–60% 60–70% Wilson: 50–60%
U.S. Representative before election
Bill Johnson
Republican
Elected U.S. Representative
Bill Johnson
Republican

The 6th district encompasses Appalachian Ohio, including Steubenville, Marietta, and Ironton. Republican Bill Johnson, who had represented Ohio's 6th congressional district since January 2011, sought re-election in 2012. He defeated Victor Smith in the Republican primary.

=== Republican primary ===
==== Candidates ====
===== Nominee =====
- Bill Johnson, incumbent U.S. representative

===== Eliminated in primary =====
- Victor Smith

==== Primary results ====
Republican primary results
| Party | Candidate | Votes | % |
|---|---|---|---|
| Republican | Bill Johnson (incumbent) | 56,905 | 83.9 |
| Republican | Victor Smith | 10,888 | 16.1 |
| Total votes | | 67,793 | 100.0 |

=== Democratic primary ===
==== Candidates ====
===== Nominee =====
- Charlie Wilson, former U.S. representative

===== Eliminated in primary =====
- Cas Adulewicz

===== Declined =====
- John Boccieri, former U.S. representative
- Zack Space, former U.S. representative

==== Primary results ====
Democratic primary results
| Party | Candidate | Votes | % |
|---|---|---|---|
| Democratic | Charlie Wilson | 37,374 | 82.2 |
| Democratic | Cas Adulewicz | 8,117 | 17.8 |
| Total votes | | 45,491 | 100.0 |

=== General election ===
==== Endorsements ====
Bill Johnson (R)

Organizations

- Campaign for Working Families
- Fraternal Order of Police
- Gun Owners of America
- Move America Forward
- National Republican Congressional Committee "Patriot" Program
- National Right to Life Committee
- NRA Political Victory Fund
- Ohio Right to Life
- United States Chamber of Commerce
Charlie Wilson (D)

Labor unions

- AFL-CIO
- American Federation of Government Employees
- American Federation of State, County and Municipal Employees
- American Federation of Teachers
- American Postal Workers Union
- International Association of Fire Fighters
- International Association of Machinists and Aerospace Workers
- International Brotherhood of Boilermakers
- International Brotherhood of Electrical Workers
- International Brotherhood of Teamsters
- International Union of Bricklayers and Allied Craftworkers
- International Union of Operating Engineers
- Laborers' International Union of North America
- National Education Association
- Sheet Metal Workers' International Association
- United Food and Commercial Workers
- United Mine Workers of America
- United Steelworkers

Organizations

- Alliance for Retired Americans
- Blue Dog Coalition
- Democratic Congressional Campaign Committee "Red to Blue" Program

==== Polling ====
| Poll source | Date(s) administered | Sample size | Margin of error | Bill Johnson (R) | Charlie Wilson (D) | Undecided |
|---|---|---|---|---|---|---|
| Anzalone Liszt Research (D-Wilson) | October 8–10, 2012 | 500 | ± 4.4% | 43% | 49% | 8% |
| Public Opinion Strategies (R-Johnson) | September 26–27, 2012 | 400 | ± 4.9% | 47% | 39% | 14% |
| Anzalone Liszt Research (D-Wilson) | September 9–12, 2012 | 500 | ± 4.4% | 46% | 46% | 8% |
| Policy Polling | January 18–23, 2012 | 768 | ± 3.5% | 42% | 41% | 17% |

==== Predictions ====
| Source | Ranking | As of |
|---|---|---|
| The Cook Political Report | Tossup | November 5, 2012 |
| Rothenberg | Lean R | November 2, 2012 |
| Roll Call | Lean R | November 4, 2012 |
| Sabato's Crystal Ball | Lean R | November 5, 2012 |
| NY Times | Tossup | November 4, 2012 |
| RCP | Tossup | November 4, 2012 |
| The Hill | Lean R | November 4, 2012 |

==== Results ====
Ohio's 6th congressional district, 2012
| Party | Candidate | Votes | % |
|---|---|---|---|
| Republican | Bill Johnson (incumbent) | 164,536 | 53.2 |
| Democratic | Charlie Wilson | 144,444 | 46.8 |
| Total votes | | 308,980 | 100.0 |
| Republican hold | | | |

== District 7 ==
2012 Ohio's 7th congressional district election
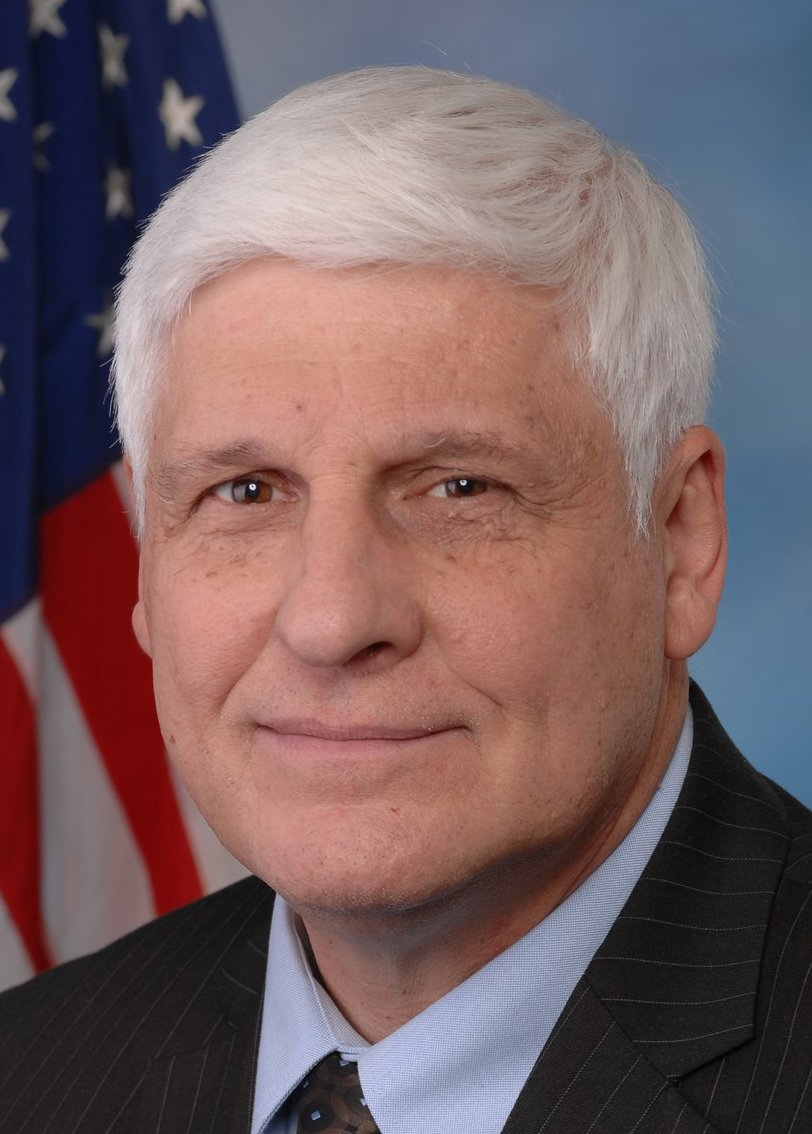

| Nominee | Bob Gibbs | Joyce Healy-Abrams |
| Party | Republican | Democratic |
| Popular vote | 178,104 | 137,708 |
| Percentage | 56.39% | 43.61% |
- County results Gibbs: 50–60% 60–70% 80–90% Healy-Abrams: 50–60%
U.S. Representative before election
Bob Gibbs
Republican
Elected U.S. Representative
Bob Gibbs
Republican

Republican Bob Gibbs, who had represented Ohio's 18th congressional district since January 2011, won the Republican nomination in the new 7th district. He defeated pastor Hombre Liggett.

=== Republican primary ===
==== Candidates ====
===== Nominee =====
- Bob Gibbs, incumbent U.S. representative

===== Eliminated in primary =====
- Hombre Liggett

=== Primary results ===
Republican primary results
| Party | Candidate | Votes | % |
|---|---|---|---|
| Republican | Bob Gibbs (incumbent) | 54,067 | 79.9 |
| Republican | Hombre Liggett | 13,621 | 20.1 |
| Total votes | | 67,688 | 100.0 |

=== Democratic primary ===
Joseph Liolios had planned to run, but failed to refile after the Ohio General Assembly modified some districts' boundaries and moved the date of the primary.

Political consultant Bill Burges suggested in September 2011 that Democratic U.S. Representative Betty Sutton, who had represented the 13th district since 2007, might have sought re-election in the 7th district; however, in December 2011, she announced plans to run in the 16th district.

==== Candidates ====
===== Nominee =====
- Joyce Healy-Abrams, businesswoman and sister of Canton mayor William J. Healy II

===== Declined =====
- John Boccieri, former U.S. representative
- Zack Space, former U.S. representative
- Betty Sutton, incumbent U.S. representative for the 13th district

=== Primary results ===
Democratic primary results
| Party | Candidate | Votes | % |
|---|---|---|---|
| Democratic | Joyce Healy-Abrams | 22,486 | 100.0 |

=== General election ===
==== Endorsements ====
Bob Gibbs (R)

Organizations

- Campaign for Working Families
- Gun Owners of America
- National Republican Congressional Committee "Patriot" Program
- National Right to Life Committee
- NRA Political Victory Fund
- Ohio Right to Life
- United States Chamber of Commerce

Newspapers

- Cleveland Plain Dealer
Joyce Healy-Abrams (D)

Labor unions

- AFL-CIO
- International Brotherhood of Boilermakers
- National Association of Letter Carriers
- National Education Association
- United Steelworkers

Organizations

- Alliance for Retired Americans
- Democratic Congressional Campaign Committee "Emerging Races" Program
- EMILY's List
- Feminist Majority
- National Organization for Women
- Planned Parenthood Action Fund

==== Polling ====
Hypothetical polling

With generic Democratic

| Poll source | Date(s) administered | Sample size | Margin of error | Bob Gibbs (R) | Generic Democratic (D) | Undecided |
|---|---|---|---|---|---|---|
| Public Policy Polling | January 18–23, 2012 | 693 | ±3.7% | 42% | 43% | 15% |

==== Predictions ====
| Source | Ranking | As of |
|---|---|---|
| The Cook Political Report | Likely R | November 5, 2012 |
| Rothenberg | Safe R | November 2, 2012 |
| Roll Call | Safe R | November 4, 2012 |
| Sabato's Crystal Ball | Safe R | November 5, 2012 |
| NY Times | Lean R | November 4, 2012 |
| RCP | Likely R | November 4, 2012 |
| The Hill | Likely R | November 4, 2012 |

==== Debate ====
2012 Ohio's 7th congressional district debate
| No. | Date | Host | Moderator | Link | Republican | Democratic |
| Key: P Participant A Absent N Not invited I Invited W Withdrawn | | | | | | |
| Key: P Participant A Absent N Not invited I Invited W Withdrawn | | | | | Bob Gibbs | Joyce Healy-Abrams |
|---|---|---|---|---|---|---|
| 1 | Oct. 30, 2012 | Kenyon College Center for the Study of American Democracy | Tom Karako; Samantha Scoles; Jack Torry | | P | P |

==== Results ====
Ohio's 7th congressional district, 2012
| Party | Candidate | Votes | % |
|---|---|---|---|
| Republican | Bob Gibbs (incumbent) | 178,104 | 56.4 |
| Democratic | Joyce Healy-Abrams | 137,708 | 43.6 |
| Total votes | | 315,812 | 100.0 |
| Republican hold | | | |

== District 8 ==
2012 Ohio's 8th congressional district election
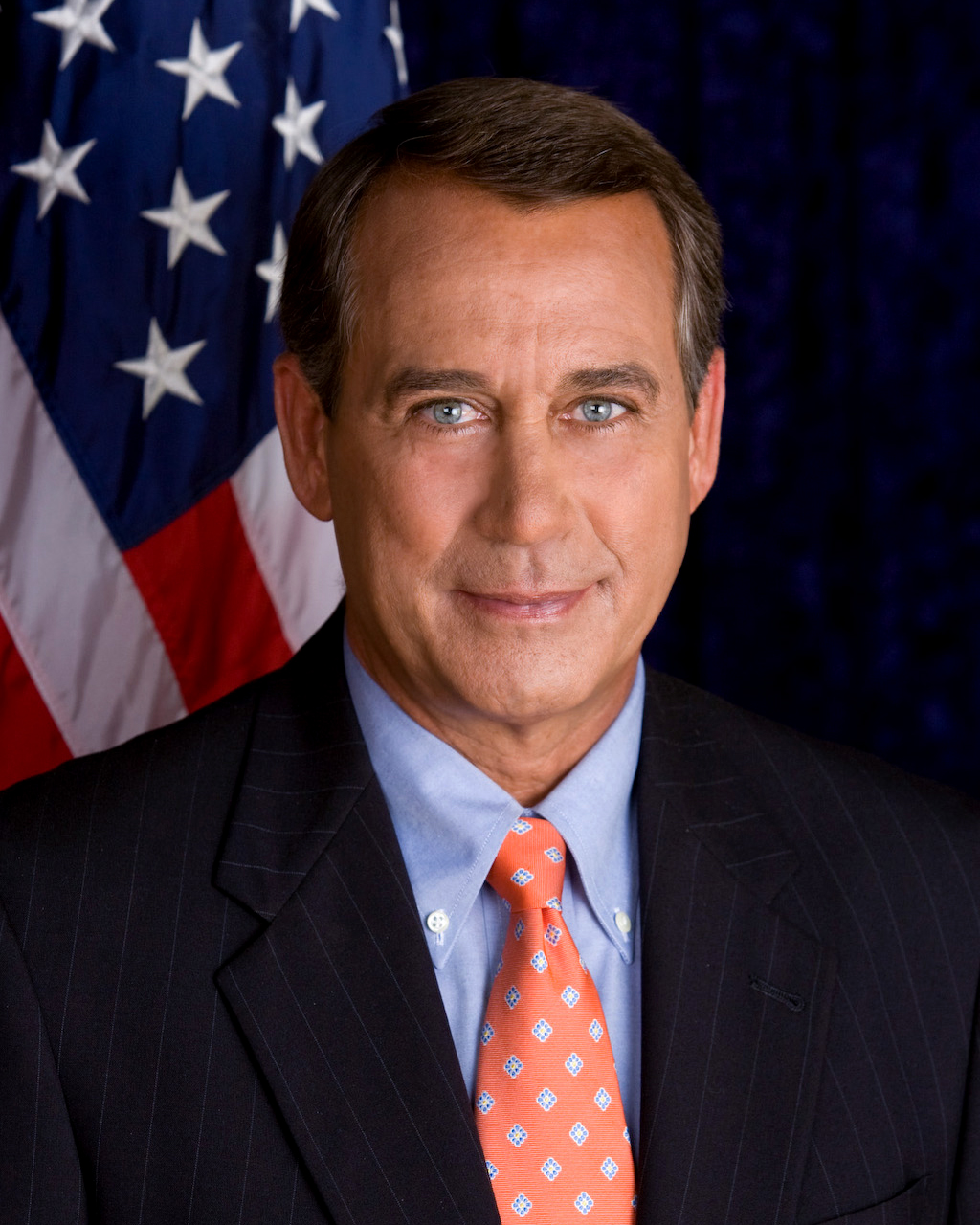
| Nominee | John Boehner |
| Party | Republican |
| Popular vote | 246,378 |
| Percentage | 99.21% |
- County results Boehner: 90–100% 100–110%
U.S. Representative before election
John Boehner
Republican
Elected U.S. Representative
John Boehner
Republican

Ohio's 8th congressional district had been represented by Republican John Boehner, the Speaker of the House, since 1991. He sought re-election in 2012.

No Democrat filed to challenge Boehner.

=== Republican primary ===
==== Candidates ====
===== Nominee =====
- John Boehner, incumbent U.S. representative

===== Eliminated in primary =====
- David Lewis, pro-life and Tea Party activist

==== Primary results ====
Republican primary results
| Party | Candidate | Votes | % |
|---|---|---|---|
| Republican | John Boehner (incumbent) | 71,120 | 83.8 |
| Republican | David Lewis | 13,733 | 16.2 |
| Total votes | | 84,843 | 100.0 |
| Republican hold | | | |

=== General election ===
==== Endorsements ====
John Boehner (R)

Organizations

- Campaign for Working Families
- National Right to Life Committee
- NRA Political Victory Fund
- Ohio Right to Life
- United States Chamber of Commerce

==== Predictions ====
| Source | Ranking | As of |
|---|---|---|
| The Cook Political Report | Safe R | November 5, 2012 |
| Rothenberg | Safe R | November 2, 2012 |
| Roll Call | Safe R | November 4, 2012 |
| Sabato's Crystal Ball | Safe R | November 5, 2012 |
| NY Times | Safe R | November 4, 2012 |
| RCP | Safe R | November 4, 2012 |
| The Hill | Safe R | November 4, 2012 |

==== Results ====
Ohio's 8th congressional district, 2012
| Party | Candidate | Votes | % |
|---|---|---|---|
| Republican | John Boehner (incumbent) | 246,378 | 99.2 |
| Independent | James Condit (write-in) | 1,938 | 0.8 |
| Total votes | | 248,316 | 100.0 |
| Republican hold | | | |

== District 9 ==
2012 Ohio's 9th congressional district election
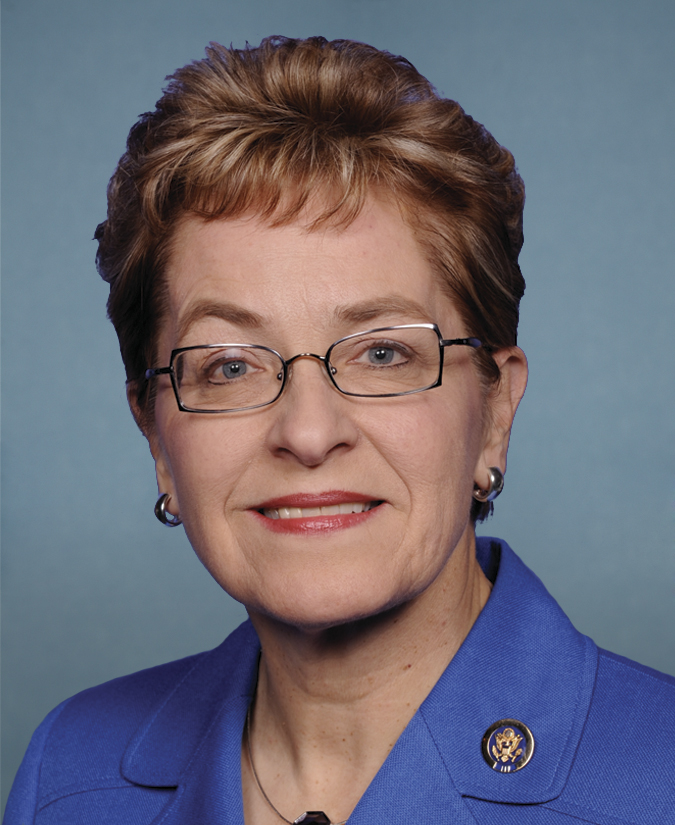

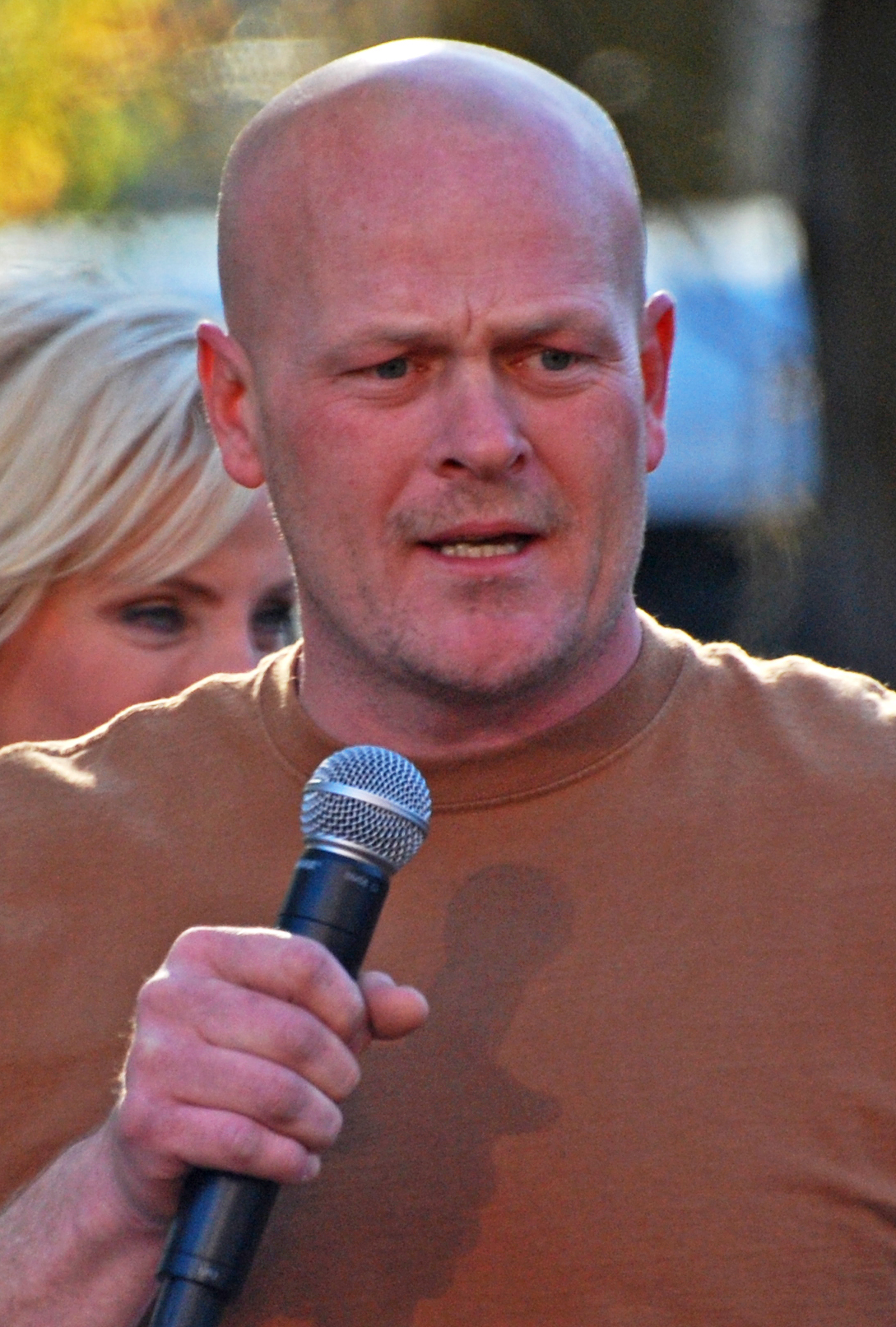
| Nominee | Marcy Kaptur | Samuel Wurzelbacher |
| Party | Democratic | Republican |
| Popular vote | 217,775 | 68,666 |
| Percentage | 73.04% | 23.03% |
- County results Kaptur: 50–60% 60–70% 80–90%
U.S. Representatives before election
Marcy Kaptur (9th)
Dennis Kucinich (10th)
Democratic
Elected U.S. Representatives
Marcy Kaptur
Democratic

Democratic U.S. Representatives Marcy Kaptur, who had represented Ohio's 9th congressional district since 1983, and Dennis Kucinich, who represented Ohio's 10th congressional district from 1997 until January 3, 2013, and had considered seeking re-election in Washington or in the 11th district, sought re-election in the 9th district.

Both Democratic and Republican primaries were held on March 6, 2012.

=== Democratic primary ===
Democratic primary results by county: Kaptur: 40–50% 70–80% 80–90% >90% Kucinich: 70–80%

==== Candidates ====
===== Nominee =====
- Marcy Kaptur, incumbent U.S. representative

===== Eliminated in primary =====
- Dennis Kucinich, incumbent U.S. representative for the 10th district, former mayor of Cleveland, candidate for secretary of state in 1982, and candidate for president of the United States in 2004 and 2008
- Graham Veysey, video production manager

==== Primary results ====
Democratic primary results
| Party | Candidate | Votes | % |
|---|---|---|---|
| Democratic | Marcy Kaptur (incumbent) | 42,902 | 56.2 |
| Democratic | Dennis Kucinich (incumbent) | 30,564 | 40.0 |
| Democratic | Graham Vesysey | 2,900 | 3.8 |
| Total votes | | 76,366 | 100.0 |

=== Republican primary ===
==== Candidates ====
===== Nominee =====
- Samuel Wurzelbacher, a/k/a "Joe the Plumber", conservative activist and commentator

===== Eliminated in primary =====
- Steven Kraus, auctioneer

===== Declined =====
- Rich Iott, former grocery executive and nominee for this district in 2010

==== Primary results ====
Republican primary results
| Party | Candidate | Votes | % |
|---|---|---|---|
| Republican | Samuel Wurzelbacher | 15,166 | 51.4 |
| Republican | Steven Kraus | 14,323 | 48.6 |
| Total votes | | 29,489 | 100.0 |

=== Libertarian primary ===
==== Candidates ====
===== Nominee =====
- Sean Stipe

==== Primary results ====
Libertarian primary results
| Party | Candidate | Votes | % |
|---|---|---|---|
| Libertarian | Sean Stipe | 170 | 100.0 |

=== General election ===
==== Endorsements ====
Marcy Kaptur (D)

Labor unions

- AFL-CIO
- International Brotherhood of Boilermakers
- National Association of Letter Carriers
- National Education Association
- United Steelworkers

Organizations

- Alliance for Retired Americans
- Human Rights Campaign
- Stonewall Democrats

Newspapers

- Cleveland Plain Dealer
- Toledo Blade
Samuel Wurzelbacher (R)

Organizations

- Gun Owners of America
- NRA Political Victory Fund
- Ohio Right to Life

==== Predictions ====
| Source | Ranking | As of |
|---|---|---|
| The Cook Political Report | Safe D | November 5, 2012 |
| Rothenberg | Safe D | November 2, 2012 |
| Roll Call | Safe D | November 4, 2012 |
| Sabato's Crystal Ball | Safe D | November 5, 2012 |
| NY Times | Safe D | November 4, 2012 |
| RCP | Safe D | November 4, 2012 |
| The Hill | Likely D | November 4, 2012 |

==== Results ====
Ohio's 9th congressional district, 2012
| Party | Candidate | Votes | % |
|---|---|---|---|
| Democratic | Marcy Kaptur (incumbent) | 217,771 | 73.1 |
| Republican | Samuel Wurzelbacher | 68,668 | 23.0 |
| Libertarian | Sean Stipe | 11,725 | 3.9 |
| Total votes | | 298,164 | 100.0 |
| Democratic hold | | | |

== District 10 ==
2012 Ohio's 10th congressional district election
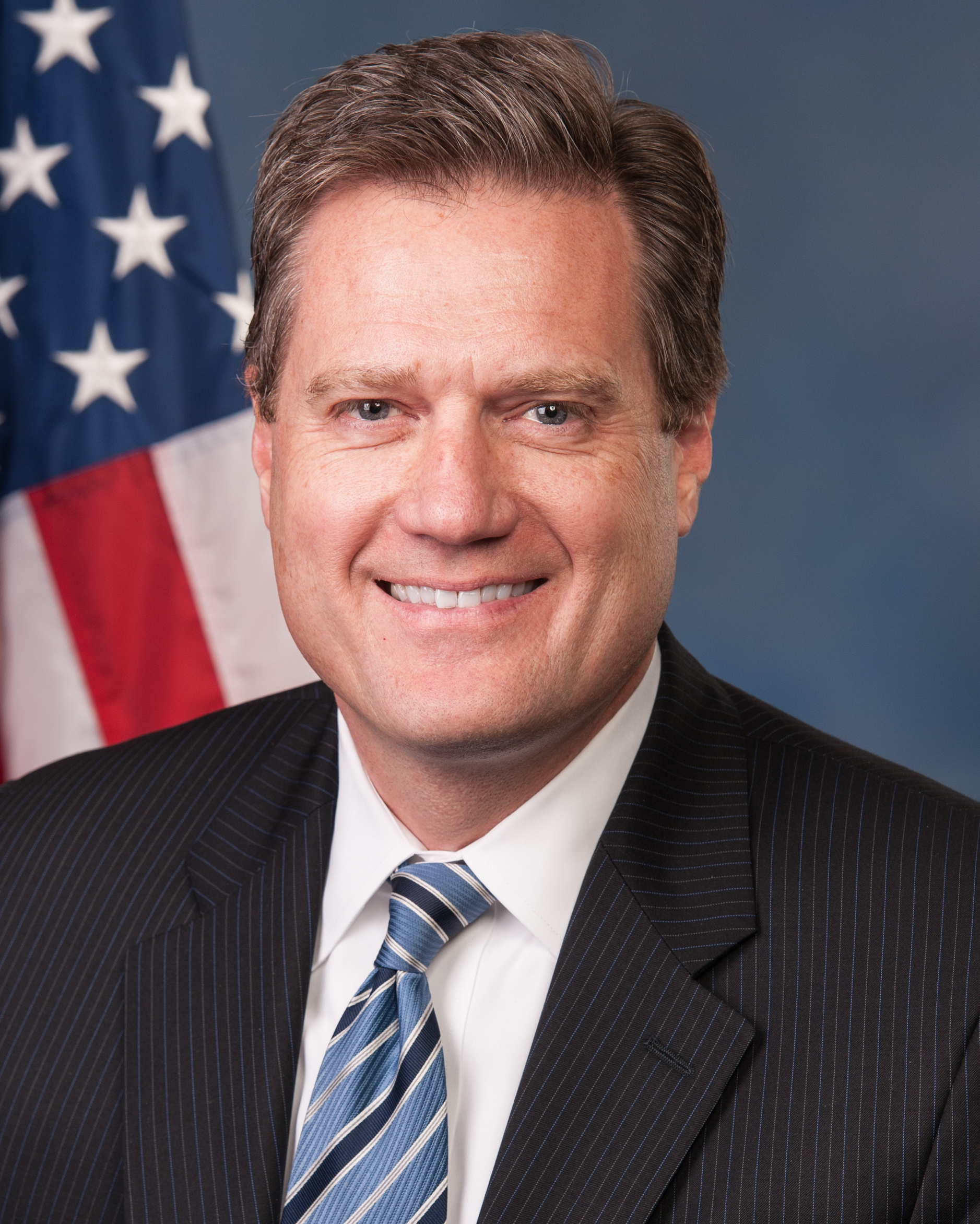
| Candidate | Mike Turner | Sharen Neuhardt |
| Party | Republican | Democratic |
| Popular vote | 208,201 | 131,097 |
| Percentage | 59.5% | 37.5% |
- County results Turner: 50–60% 60–70%
U.S. Representative before election
Mike Turner
Republican
Elected U.S. Representative
Mike Turner
Republican

Republican U.S. Representative Mike Turner, who had represented Ohio's 3rd congressional district since 2003, sought re-election in the new 10th district in 2012.

=== Republican primary ===
==== Candidates ====
===== Nominee =====
- Mike Turner, incumbent U.S. representative

===== Eliminated in primary =====
- John D. Anderson, civilian Air Force acquisition logistics and sustainment manager
- Edward Breen, substitute teacher

===== Withdrawn =====
- Robert Frost, chair of the Cuyahoga County Republican Party

===== Declined =====
- Steve Austria, incumbent U.S. representative for the 7th district

==== Endorsements ====
John Anderson

Organizations

- Republican Liberty Caucus

=== Primary results ===
Republican primary results
| Party | Candidate | Votes | % |
|---|---|---|---|
| Republican | Mike Turner (Incumbent) | 65,574 | 80.1 |
| Republican | John D. Anderson | 14,435 | 17.6 |
| Republican | Edward Breen | 1,839 | 2.3 |
| Total votes | | 81,848 | 100.0 |

=== Democratic primary ===
Six candidates qualified for the ballot in the Democratic primary. Sharen Neuhardt won the March primary with a plurality of 36% of the vote. She had in 2008 run for the seat held by Steve Austria, who defeated her 58%-42% in a district McCain won 54%-45%, thus underperforming Obama by three points. However, this redrawn district McCain would have won 50%-49%.

==== Candidates ====
===== Nominee =====
- Sharen Neuhardt, attorney and nominee for the 7th district in 2008

===== Eliminated in primary =====
- David Esrati
- Olivia Freeman, Army veteran
- Tom McMasters
- Ryan Steele
- Mack Vanallen, retired school teacher

===== Withdrawn =====
- Michael Gardner
- Richard Scott Wharton

=== Primary results ===
Democratic primary results
| Party | Candidate | Votes | % |
|---|---|---|---|
| Democratic | Sharen Neuhardt | 7,705 | 35.7 |
| Democratic | Olivia Freeman | 5,530 | 25.6 |
| Democratic | David Esrati | 2,952 | 13.7 |
| Democratic | Tom McMasters | 2,212 | 10.2 |
| Democratic | Ryan Steele | 1,644 | 7.6 |
| Democratic | Mack VanAllen | 1,530 | 7.1 |
| Total votes | | 21,573 | 100.0 |

=== Libertarian primary ===
==== Candidates ====
===== Nominee =====
- David Harlow

=== Primary results ===
Libertarian primary results
| Party | Candidate | Votes | % |
|---|---|---|---|
| Libertarian | David Harlow | 136 | 100.0 |

=== General election ===
==== Endorsements ====
Mike Turner (R)

Labor unions

- National Association of Letter Carriers

Organizations

- Campaign for Working Families
- National Right to Life Committee
- NRA Political Victory Fund
- Ohio Right to Life
- United States Chamber of Commerce
Sharen Neuhardt (D)

Labor unions

- AFL-CIO
- International Brotherhood of Boilermakers
- National Education Association
- United Steelworkers

Organizations

- Council for a Livable World
- Democratic Congressional Campaign Committee "Emerging Races" Program
- Feminist Majority
- National Organization for Women
- Planned Parenthood Action Fund

==== Predictions ====
| Source | Ranking | As of |
|---|---|---|
| The Cook Political Report | Safe R | November 5, 2012 |
| Rothenberg | Safe R | November 2, 2012 |
| Roll Call | Safe R | November 4, 2012 |
| Sabato's Crystal Ball | Safe R | November 5, 2012 |
| NY Times | Safe R | November 4, 2012 |
| RCP | Safe R | November 4, 2012 |
| The Hill | Safe R | November 4, 2012 |

==== Results ====
Ohio's 10th congressional district, 2012
| Party | Candidate | Votes | % |
|---|---|---|---|
| Republican | Mike Turner (incumbent) | 208,201 | 59.5 |
| Democratic | Sharen Neuhardt | 131,097 | 37.5 |
| Libertarian | David Harlow | 10,373 | 3.0 |
| Total votes | | 349,671 | 100.0 |
| Republican hold | | | |

== District 11 ==
2012 Ohio's 11th congressional district election
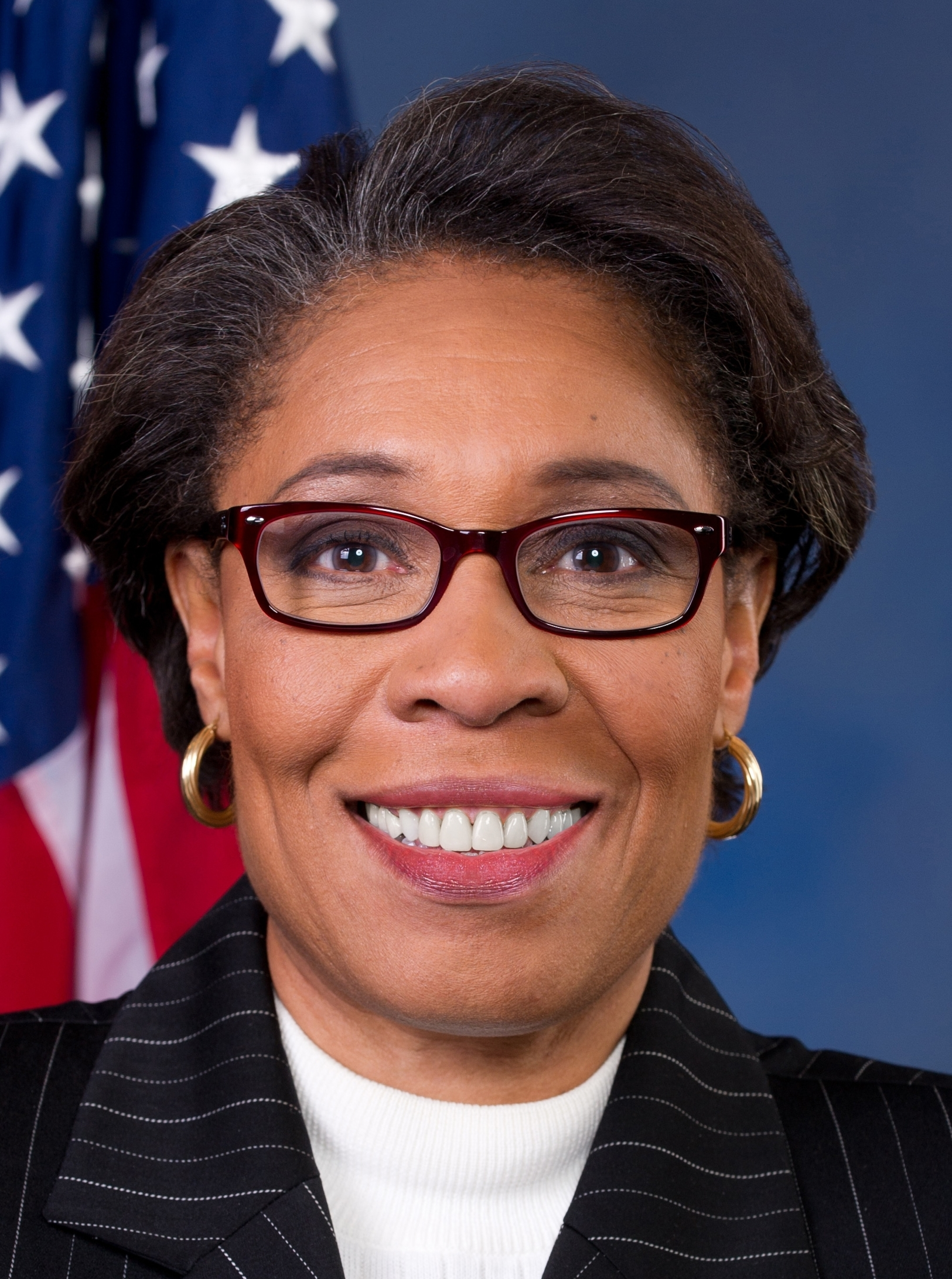
| Nominee | Marcia Fudge |
| Party | Democratic |
| Popular vote | 258,378 |
| Percentage | 100.00% |
U.S. Representative before election
Marcia Fudge
Democratic
Elected U.S. Representative
Marcia Fudge
Democratic

Ohio's 11th congressional district had been represented by Democrat Marcia Fudge since 2008. She sought re-election in 2012.

=== Democratic primary ===
==== Candidates ====
===== Nominee =====
- Marcia Fudge, incumbent U.S. representative

===== Eliminated in primary =====
- Gerald Henley, former member of the Cleveland school board and independent candidate for Cuyahoga County Council in 2010
- Isaac Powell, candidate for this seat in 2008 and 2010

===== Declined =====
- Marie Jefferson
- Dennis Kucinich, incumbent U.S. representative for the 10th district, former mayor of Cleveland, candidate for secretary of state in 1982, and candidate for president of the United States in 2004 and 2008 (running in the 9th district)
- Linda Omobien, Akron city council member
- Marco Sommerville, president of the Akron city council
- Vernon Sykes state representative
- Nina Turner, state senator
- Mike Williams, Akron city council member

=== Primary results ===
Democratic primary results
| Party | Candidate | Votes | % |
|---|---|---|---|
| Democratic | Marcia Fudge (incumbent) | 65,333 | 89.4 |
| Democratic | Gerald Carver Henley | 4,570 | 6.3 |
| Democratic | Isaac Powell | 3,169 | 4.3 |
| Total votes | | 73,072 | 100.0 |

=== General election ===
==== Endorsements ====
Marcia Fudge (D)

Labor unions

- AFL-CIO
- International Brotherhood of Boilermakers
- National Association of Letter Carriers
- National Education Association

Organizations

- Feminist Majority
- Human Rights Campaign
- National Organization for Women
- Planned Parenthood Action Fund
- Sierra Club
- Stonewall Democrats

==== Predictions ====
| Source | Ranking | As of |
|---|---|---|
| The Cook Political Report | Safe D | November 5, 2012 |
| Rothenberg | Safe D | November 2, 2012 |
| Roll Call | Safe D | November 4, 2012 |
| Sabato's Crystal Ball | Safe D | November 5, 2012 |
| NY Times | Safe D | November 4, 2012 |
| RCP | Safe D | November 4, 2012 |
| The Hill | Safe D | November 4, 2012 |

==== Results ====
Ohio's 11th congressional district, 2012
| Party | Candidate | Votes | % |
|---|---|---|---|
| Democratic | Marcia Fudge (incumbent) | 258,359 | 100.0 |
| Total votes | | 258,359 | 100.0 |
| Democratic hold | | | |

== District 12 ==
2012 Ohio's 12th congressional district election
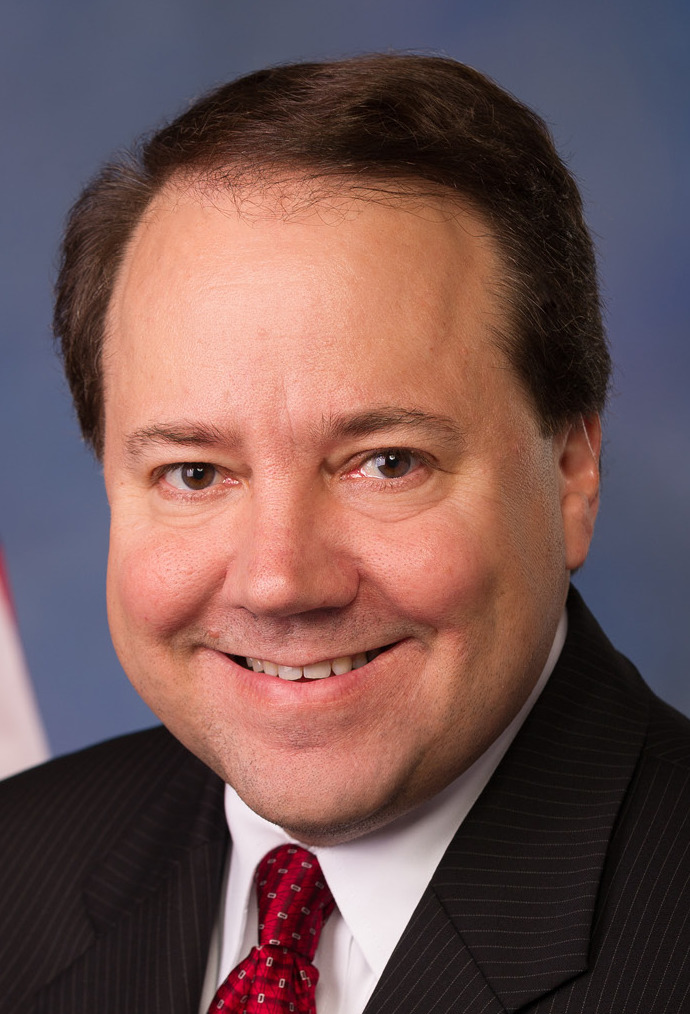

| Nominee | Pat Tiberi | Jim Reese |
| Party | Republican | Democratic |
| Popular vote | 233,874 | 134,614 |
| Percentage | 63.47% | 36.53% |
- County results Tiberi: 50–60% 60–70% 70–80%
U.S. Representative before election
Pat Tiberi
Republican
Elected U.S. Representative
Pat Tiberi
Republican

Ohio's 12th congressional district had been represented by Republican Pat Tiberi since 2001. He sought re-election in 2012.

=== Republican primary ===
==== Candidates ====
===== Nominee =====
- Pat Tiberi, incumbent U.S. representative

===== Eliminated in primary =====
- William Yarbrough

==== Endorsements ====
William Yarbrough

Organizations

- Republican Liberty Caucus

=== Primary results ===
Republican primary results
| Party | Candidate | Votes | % |
|---|---|---|---|
| Republican | Pat Tiberi (incumbent) | 72,560 | 77.9 |
| Republican | Bill Yarbrough | 20,610 | 22.1 |
| Total votes | | 93,170 | 100.0 |

=== Democratic primary ===
==== Candidates ====
===== Nominee =====
- James Reese, attorney

===== Eliminated in primary =====
- Doug Litt, employee of Spherion Staffing at Gorman-Rupp and nominee for the 4th district in 2010

=== Primary results ===
Democratic primary results
| Party | Candidate | Votes | % |
|---|---|---|---|
| Democratic | Jim Reese | 14,312 | 69.9 |
| Democratic | Doug Litt | 6,165 | 30.1 |
| Total votes | | 20,477 | 100.0 |

=== General election ===
==== Endorsements ====
Pat Tiberi (R)

Organizations

- National Right to Life Committee
- NRA Political Victory Fund
- Ohio Right to Life
- United States Chamber of Commerce

Newspapers

- The Columbus Dispatch
Jim Reese (D)

Labor unions

- AFL-CIO
- International Brotherhood of Boilermakers
- United Steelworkers

Organizations

- Alliance for Retired Americans

==== Predictions ====
| Source | Ranking | As of |
|---|---|---|
| The Cook Political Report | Safe R | November 5, 2012 |
| Rothenberg | Safe R | November 2, 2012 |
| Roll Call | Safe R | November 4, 2012 |
| Sabato's Crystal Ball | Safe R | November 5, 2012 |
| NY Times | Safe R | November 4, 2012 |
| RCP | Safe R | November 4, 2012 |
| The Hill | Safe R | November 4, 2012 |

==== Results ====
Ohio's 12th congressional district, 2012
| Party | Candidate | Votes | % |
|---|---|---|---|
| Republican | Pat Tiberi (incumbent) | 233,869 | 63.5 |
| Democratic | Jim Reese | 134,605 | 36.5 |
| Total votes | | 368,474 | 100.0 |
| Republican hold | | | |

== District 13 ==
2012 Ohio's 13th congressional district election
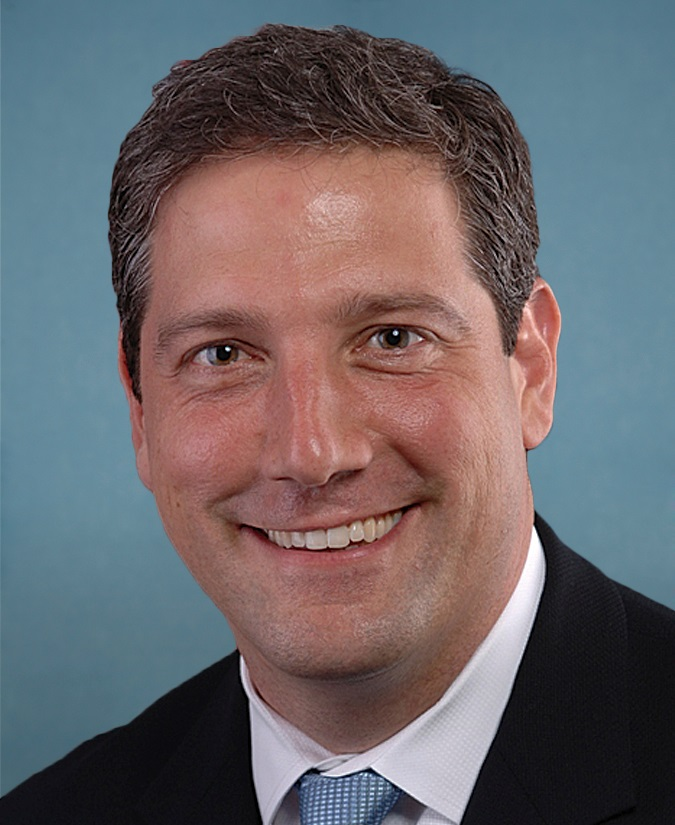

| Nominee | Tim Ryan | Marisha Agana |
| Party | Democratic | Republican |
| Popular vote | 235,942 | 88,120 |
| Percentage | 72.77% | 27.23% |
- County results Ryan: 60–70% 70–80%
U.S. Representative before election
Tim Ryan
Democratic
Elected U.S. Representative
Tim Ryan
Democratic

Democrat Betty Sutton, who had represented Ohio's 13th congressional district since 2007, sought re-election in the new 16th district in 2012. Tim Ryan, who had represented the now-defunct 17th district since 2003, ran unopposed for the Democratic nomination in the new 13th district.

=== Democratic primary ===
John Stephen Luchansky and Lisa Regula Meyer had also filed to seek the Democratic nomination, but both failed to refile after the Ohio General Assembly modified some districts' boundaries and moved the date of the primary.

==== Candidates ====
===== Nominee =====
- Tim Ryan, incumbent U.S. representative

==== Primary results ====
Democratic primary results
| Party | Candidate | Votes | % |
|---|---|---|---|
| Democratic | Tim Ryan (incumbent) | 56,670 | 100.0 |

=== Republican primary ===
==== Candidates ====
===== Nominee =====
- Marisha Agana, pediatrician

=== Primary results ===
Republican primary results
| Party | Candidate | Votes | % |
|---|---|---|---|
| Republican | Marisha Agana | 27,754 | 100.0 |

=== General election ===
==== Endorsements ====
Tim Ryan (D)

Labor unions

- AFL-CIO
- International Brotherhood of Boilermakers
- National Association of Letter Carriers
- National Education Association
- United Steelworkers

Organizations

- Alliance for Retired Americans
- Human Rights Campaign
Marisha Agana (R)

Organizations

- Ohio Right to Life

==== Predictions ====
| Source | Ranking | As of |
|---|---|---|
| The Cook Political Report | Safe D | November 5, 2012 |
| Rothenberg | Safe D | November 2, 2012 |
| Roll Call | Safe D | November 4, 2012 |
| Sabato's Crystal Ball | Safe D | November 5, 2012 |
| NY Times | Safe D | November 4, 2012 |
| RCP | Safe D | November 4, 2012 |
| The Hill | Safe D | November 4, 2012 |

==== Results ====
Ohio's 13th congressional district, 2012
| Party | Candidate | Votes | % |
|---|---|---|---|
| Democratic | Tim Ryan (incumbent) | 235,492 | 72.8 |
| Republican | Marisha Agana | 88,120 | 27.2 |
| Total votes | | 323,612 | 100.0 |
| Democratic hold | | | |

== District 14 ==
2012 Ohio's 14th congressional district election
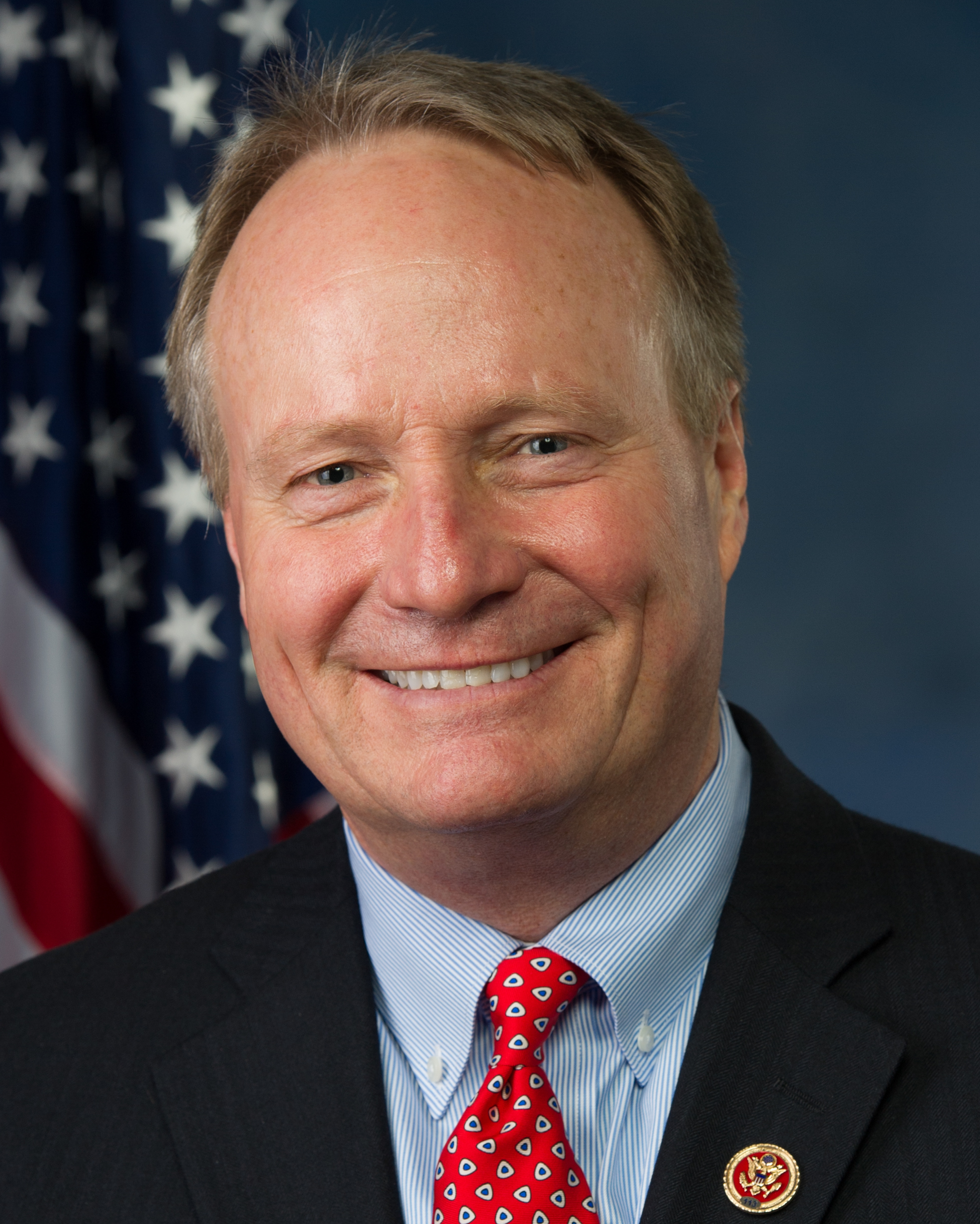

| Nominee | David Joyce | Dale Blanchard |
| Party | Republican | Democratic |
| Popular vote | 183,660 | 131,638 |
| Percentage | 54.03% | 38.73% |
- County results Joyce: 40–50% 50–60% 60–70% Blanchard: 40–50%
U.S. Representative before election
Steve LaTourette
Republican
Elected U.S. Representative
David Joyce
Republican

Republican Steve LaTourette, who had represented Ohio's 14th congressional district since 1995, was expected to seek re-election and ran unopposed in the party primary

=== Republican primary ===
==== Candidates ====
===== Nominee =====
- Steve LaTourette, incumbent U.S. representative

=== Primary results ===
Republican primary results
| Party | Candidate | Votes | % |
|---|---|---|---|
| Republican | Steve LaTourette (incumbent) | 69,551 | 100.0 |

LaTourette announced on July 31, 2012, that he was retiring at the end of the term. He officially withdrew from the ballot on August 8, allowing the party chairmen from the seven counties in the district to select a replacement nominee.

==== Replacement nominee ====
- David Joyce, Geauga County prosecutor

Other possible replacements who had been mentioned included Willoughby-Eastlake School Board member Paul Brickner, former state Senator Kevin Coughlin, Lake County Judge Vince Culotta, former state Representative Matt Dolan, former state Senator Tim Grendell, state Senator Frank LaRose, Cuyahoga County Councilman Jack Schron, and state Representative Ron Young.

=== Democratic primary ===
==== Candidates ====
===== Nominee =====
- Dale Virgil Blanchard, accountant and perennial candidate

=== Primary results ===
Democratic primary results
| Party | Candidate | Votes | % |
|---|---|---|---|
| Democratic | Dale Blanchard | 29,508 | 100.0 |

=== Green primary ===
- Elaine Mastromatteo

=== Primary results ===
Green primary results
| Party | Candidate | Votes | % |
|---|---|---|---|
| Green | Elaine Mastromatteo | 94 | 100.0 |

=== Libertarian primary ===
- David Macko

=== Primary results ===
Libertarian primary results
| Party | Candidate | Votes | % |
|---|---|---|---|
| Libertarian | David Macko | 221 | 100.0 |

=== General election ===
==== Endorsements ====
David Joyce (R)

Organizations

- National Republican Congressional Committee "Young Guns" Program
- NRA Political Victory Fund
- Ohio Right to Life
- United States Chamber of Commerce

Newspapers

- Akron Beacon Journal
- Cleveland Plain Dealer

==== Predictions ====
| Source | Ranking | As of |
|---|---|---|
| The Cook Political Report | Safe R | November 5, 2012 |
| Rothenberg | Safe R | November 2, 2012 |
| Roll Call | Safe R | November 4, 2012 |
| Sabato's Crystal Ball | Safe R | November 5, 2012 |
| NY Times | Safe R | November 4, 2012 |
| RCP | Safe R | November 4, 2012 |
| The Hill | Safe R | November 4, 2012 |

==== Results ====
Ohio's 14th congressional district, 2012
| Party | Candidate | Votes | % |
|---|---|---|---|
| Republican | David Joyce | 183,657 | 54.0 |
| Democratic | Dale Blanchard | 131,637 | 38.7 |
| Green | Elaine Mastromatteo | 13,038 | 3.9 |
| Libertarian | David Macko | 11,536 | 3.4 |
| Independent | Aaron Zurbrugg (write-in) | 20 | 0.0 |
| Independent | Steven Winfield (write-in) | 5 | 0.0 |
| Independent | Erick Donald Robinson (write-in) | 1 | 0.0 |
| Total votes | | 339,894 | 100.0 |

== District 15 ==
2012 Ohio's 15th congressional district election
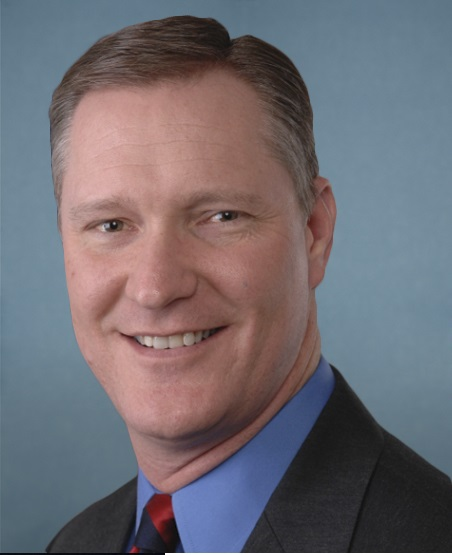

| Nominee | Steve Stivers | Pat Lang |
| Party | Republican | Democratic |
| Popular vote | 205,277 | 128,188 |
| Percentage | 61.56% | 38.44% |
- County results Stivers: 50–60% 60–70% 70–80% Lang: 60–70%
U.S. Representative before election
Steve Stivers
Republican
Elected U.S. Representative
Steve Stivers
Republican

Republican Steve Stivers, who had represented Ohio's 15th congressional district since January 2011, sought re-election in 2012.

=== Republican primary ===
==== Candidates ====
===== Nominee =====
- Steve Stivers, incumbent U.S. representative

===== Eliminated in primary =====
- Ralph Applegate
- Charles Chope

=== Primary results ===
Republican primary results
| Party | Candidate | Votes | % |
|---|---|---|---|
| Republican | Steve Stivers (incumbent) | 70,191 | 89.3 |
| Republican | Charles S. Chope | 8,404 | 10.7 |
| Total votes | | 78,595 | 100.0 |

=== Democratic primary ===
==== Candidates ====
===== Nominee =====
- Pat Lang, Athens city law director

===== Eliminated in primary =====
- Scott Wharton, farmer and pilot

=== Primary results ===
Democratic primary results
| Party | Candidate | Votes | % |
|---|---|---|---|
| Democratic | Pat Lang | 16,483 | 56.7 |
| Democratic | Scott Wharton | 12,599 | 43.3 |
| Total votes | | 29,082 | 100.0 |

=== General election ===
==== Endorsements ====
Steve Stivers (R)

Organizations

- GOProud
- National Right to Life Committee
- NRA Political Victory Fund
- Ohio Right to Life
- United States Chamber of Commerce

Newspapers

- The Columbus Dispatch
Pat Lang (D)

Labor unions

- AFL-CIO
- International Brotherhood of Boilermakers
- National Education Association
- United Steelworkers

Organizations

- Alliance for Retired Americans
- Sierra Club
- Stonewall Democrats

Newspapers

- Athens News

==== Predictions ====
| Source | Ranking | As of |
|---|---|---|
| The Cook Political Report | Safe R | November 5, 2012 |
| Rothenberg | Safe R | November 2, 2012 |
| Roll Call | Safe R | November 4, 2012 |
| Sabato's Crystal Ball | Safe R | November 5, 2012 |
| NY Times | Safe R | November 4, 2012 |
| RCP | Safe R | November 4, 2012 |
| The Hill | Safe R | November 4, 2012 |

==== Results ====
Ohio's 15th congressional district, 2012
| Party | Candidate | Votes | % |
|---|---|---|---|
| Republican | Steve Stivers (incumbent) | 205,274 | 61.6 |
| Democratic | Pat Lang | 128,188 | 38.4 |
| Total votes | | 333,462 | 100.0 |
| Republican hold | | | |

== District 16 ==
2012 Ohio's 16th congressional district election
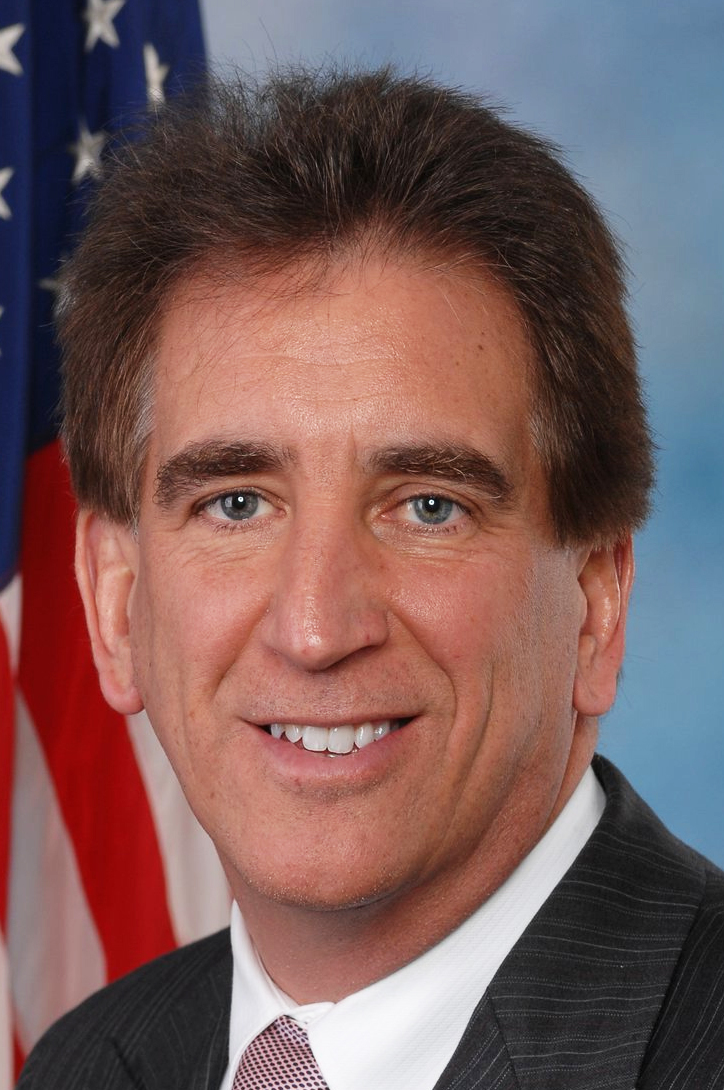

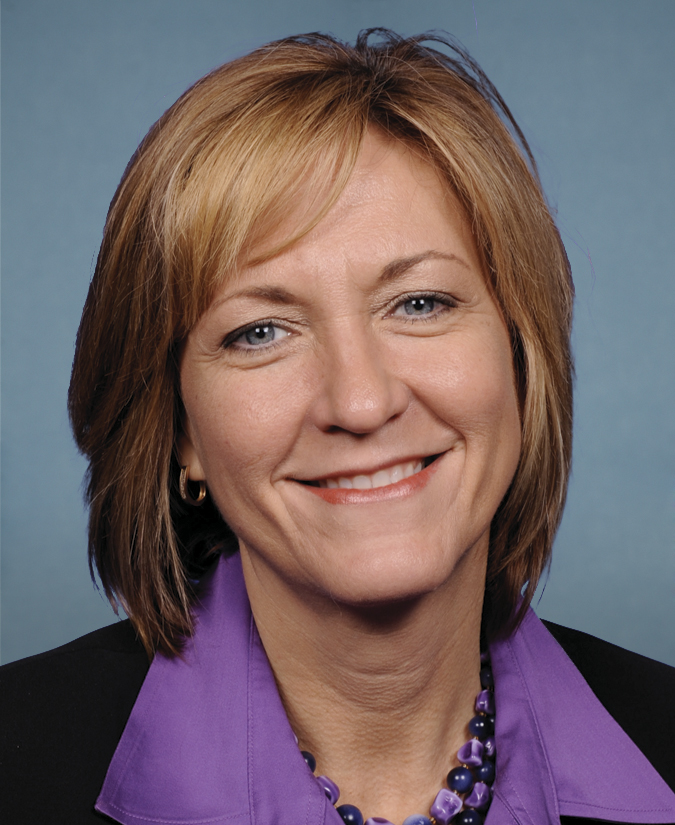
| Nominee | Jim Renacci | Betty Sutton |
| Party | Republican | Democratic |
| Popular vote | 185,165 | 170,600 |
| Percentage | 52.04% | 47.96% |
- County results Renacci: 50–60% Sutton: 50–60%
U.S. Representative before election
Jim Renacci (Republican)
Betty Sutton (Democratic)
Elected U.S. Representative
Jim Renacci
Republican

Ohio's 16th congressional district had been represented by Republican Jim Renacci since January 2011. He sought re-election in 2012.

=== Republican primary ===
==== Candidates ====
===== Nominee =====
- Jim Renacci, incumbent U.S. representative

=== Primary results ===
Republican primary results
| Party | Candidate | Votes | % |
|---|---|---|---|
| Republican | Jim Renacci (incumbent) | 66,487 | 100.0 |

=== Democratic primary ===
==== Candidates ====
===== Nominee =====
- Betty Sutton, incumbent U.S. representative for the 13th district

===== Declined =====
- John Boccieri, former U.S. representative
- Zack Space, former U.S. representative

=== Primary results ===
Democratic primary results
| Party | Candidate | Votes | % |
|---|---|---|---|
| Democratic | Betty Sutton (incumbent) | 37,232 | 100.0 |

==== Candidates ====
===== Nominee =====
- Jeffrey Blevins, restaurant manager and nominee for this seat in 2010 (withdrew August 23, 2012)

=== Primary results ===
Libertarian primary results
| Party | Candidate | Votes | % |
|---|---|---|---|
| Libertarian | Jeffrey Blevins | 135 | 100.0 |

=== General election ===
==== Endorsements ====
Jim Renacci (R)

Organizations

- National Republican Congressional Committee "Patriot" Program
- National Right to Life Committee
- NRA Political Victory Fund
- Ohio Right to Life
- United States Chamber of Commerce
Betty Sutton (D)

Labor unions

- AFL-CIO
- American Nurses Association
- International Brotherhood of Boilermakers
- National Association of Letter Carriers
- National Education Association
- United Steelworkers

Organizations

- Alliance for Retired Americans
- Council for a Livable World
- Democracy for America
- Democratic Congressional Campaign Committee "Frontline" Program
- EMILY's List
- Equality Ohio
- Feminist Majority
- Human Rights Campaign
- Humane Society of the United States
- National Organization for Women
- Planned Parenthood Action Fund
- Sierra Club
- Stonewall Democrats

Newspapers

- Akron Beacon Journal
- Cleveland Plain Dealer
- Sun Newspapers

==== Polling ====
| Poll source | Date(s) administered | Sample size | Margin of error | Jim Renacci (R) | Betty Sutton (D) | Jeffrey Blevins (L) | Undecided |
|---|---|---|---|---|---|---|---|
| Celinda Lake | October 14–18, 2012 | 400 | ± 4.9% | 49% | 47% | – | 4% |
| OnMessage Inc (R-Renacci) | October 15, 2012 | 400 | ± 4.9% | 51% | 41% | – | 8% |
| Normington, Petts & Associates (D-House Majority PAC)/SEIU) | July 26–28, 2012 | 400 | ± 4.9% | 38% | 41% | 4% | 17% |
| GBA Strategies (D-Sutton) | July 15–19, 2012 | 500 | ± 4.4% | 40% | 42% | 12% | 6% |
| Public Policy Polling | January 18–23, 2012 | 812 | ± 3.4% | 46% | 46% | – | 8% |

==== Debates ====
2012 Ohio's 16th congressional district debates
| No. | Date | Host | Moderator | Link | Republican | Democratic |
| Key: P Participant A Absent N Not invited I Invited W Withdrawn | | | | | | |
| Key: P Participant A Absent N Not invited I Invited W Withdrawn | | | | | Jim Renacci | Betty Sutton |
|---|---|---|---|---|---|---|
| 1 | Oct. 10, 2012 | City Club of Cleveland | Michael McIntyre | | P | P |
| 2 | Oct. 23, 2012 | American Association of University Women Wooster branch University of Akron Wayne College; Wayne County League of Women Voters | Cindy Biggs | | P | P |

==== Predictions ====
| Source | Ranking | As of |
|---|---|---|
| The Cook Political Report | Lean R | November 5, 2012 |
| Rothenberg | Tossup | November 2, 2012 |
| Roll Call | Lean R | November 4, 2012 |
| Sabato's Crystal Ball | Lean D (flip) | November 5, 2012 |
| NY Times | Tossup | November 4, 2012 |
| RCP | Tossup | November 4, 2012 |
| The Hill | Tossup | November 4, 2012 |

==== Results ====
Ohio's 16th congressional district, 2012
| Party | Candidate | Votes | % |
|---|---|---|---|
| Republican | Jim Renacci (incumbent) | 185,165 | 52.0 |
| Democratic | Betty Sutton (incumbent) | 170,600 | 48.0 |
| Total votes | | 355,765 | 100.0 |
| Republican hold | | | |
