= Connie Pillich =

American politician

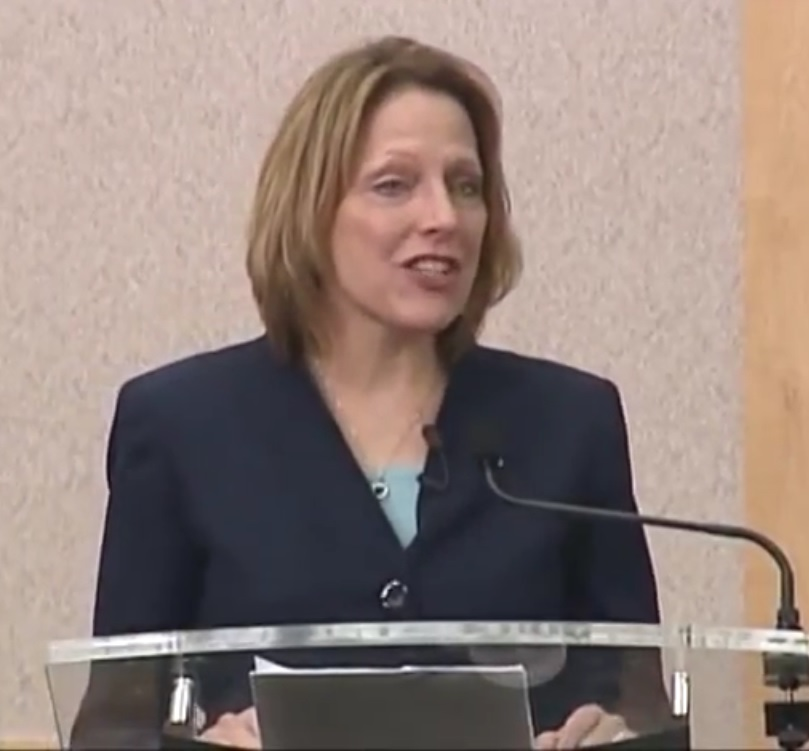

Member of the Ohio House of Representatives from the 28th district
- In office January 5, 2009 – December 31, 2014
- Preceded by: Andrew Ciarfardini
- Succeeded by: Jonathan Dever

Personal details
- Born: September 7, 1960 (age 65) Buffalo, New York, U.S.
- Party: Democratic
- Education: University of Oklahoma (BA); University of North Dakota (MBA); University of Cincinnati (JD)

Military service
- Allegiance: United States
- Branch/service: United States Air Force
- Rank: Captain

Connie Pillich (born September 7, 1960) is the Hamilton County Prosecuting Attorney and former Democratic member of the Ohio House of Representatives, representing the 28th District between 2009 and 2014. She was the Democratic candidate for Ohio State Treasurer in 2014.

== Career ==
After graduating from the University of Cincinnati in law, Pillich served as a public defender before opening her own law firm, Webb & Pillich, LLC. Prior, she had a career in the United States Air Force, serving in support of Operations Desert Storm and Desert Shield. In 2012, she opened The Pillich Group, which provides business, development, and political consulting. In 2018, Pillich accepted a one-year contract with the National Association of Women Judges.

== Ohio House of Representatives ==
Pillich first aimed to oust incumbent Jim Raussen in the 2006 elections, where despite a large Republican index, the race was expected to be competitive. However, Raussen edged Pillich to keep his seat, by only 1,592 votes.

Pillich tried again against Raussen in 2008. However, in a surprise move, Governor Ted Strickland appointed Raussen to a post in the Department of Development only a few months out from the election. The departure of Raussen from the election left Republicans scrambling, and improved Pillich's chances of taking the seat. Many names came up as potential candidates, including former Ohio Senate President Richard Finan. In the end, Hamilton County Republicans chose Virgil Lovitt to run against Pillich. This time, riding a Democratic wave, Pillich defeated Lovitt by 5,500 votes. In Pillich's first term, Speaker of the House Armond Budish appointed her as Vice-Chair of the House Criminal Justice Committee; as well as to Veterans Affairs; Public Utilities; Financial Institutions, Real Estate and Securities; and Alternative Energy Committees.

In her first reelection campaign in 2010, Pillich faced Republican, and Tea Party activist Mike Wilson and a Libertarian candidate. On election night, the race proved to be the closest in Ohio for 2010, with Pillich leading Wilson by just five votes, triggering an automatic recount of ballots. After all ballots were counted however, Pillich had won by about 600 votes. She served as ranking member of the Veterans Affairs Committee; and on the committees of Financial Institutions, Housing, and Urban Development; Public Utilities; and Criminal Justice. She also served as Secretary of the Ohio House Democratic Women's Caucus, and was a member of the Military Activation Task Force; the State Council on Educational Opportunities for Military Children; the Family Violence Prevention Council Advisory Board; and the Clean Ohio Council.

Early in her second term, Pillich cosponsored a bill that would provide tax credits to businesses that increase their payrolls and expand into vacant facilities.

In November 2012, Pillich was elected to a third term, despite redistricting viewed as unfavorable to her chances. She garnered 51.68% of the vote, defeating Republican Mike Wilson (43.95%) and Libertarian Robert R. Ryan (4.37%).

Pillich ran unsuccessfully for Treasurer of Ohio in 2014. She announced on March 13, 2017 that she will be a candidate for Governor of Ohio in 2018. On January 18, 2018, she announced that Marion mayor Scott Schertzer was her running mate. She dropped out of the race and endorsed Richard Cordray on February 13.

On June 9, 2018, Pillich was elected as co-chair of the Hamilton County Democratic Party.

Party political offices
Preceded by Kevin Boyce	Democratic nominee for Ohio State Treasurer; 2014	Succeeded by Rob Richardson
