= Andrew Ciafardini =

American politician

Member of the Ohio House of Representatives from the 28th district
- In office November 13, 2008-December 31, 2008
- Preceded by: Jim Raussen
- Succeeded by: Connie Pillich

Personal details
- Born: Cincinnati, Ohio
- Party: Republican
- Education: George Mason University
- Profession: Public relations

Andrew Ciafardini is a former Republican member of the Ohio House of Representatives, representing the 28th District for a brief month in 2008. He is currently Chief Corporate Affairs Officer at Worldpay. Previously, he was Vice President of Corporate Communications at Vantiv Corporation, located in Symmes Township, Ohio. Previously he was Chief of Staff and Director of Communications at Chiquita Brands International.
