= Wayne Coates =

American politician

Member of the Ohio House of Representatives from the 32nd district
- In office January 3, 2001-December 31, 2002
- Preceded by: Dale N. Van Vyven
- Succeeded by: Jim Raussen

Personal details
- Party: Democratic

Wayne Coates is a former member of the Ohio House of Representatives. He represented a Cincinnati, Ohio area district from 2001-2002. He was succeeded by Republican Jim Raussen. Mr Coates serves as the Hamilton County Recorder being elected in November 2008 and took office January 5, 2009, and also serves as Treasurer of the Ohio Recorders’ Association.

Prior to being elected as County Recorder, he served as Administrative Courtroom Bailiff for Hamilton County Municipal Court Judge Ted N. Berry.

Wayne Coates previously served as Mayor of the City of Forest Park from December 4, 1995 through December 1, 1999, having served on City Council since 1989. As Mayor, he served as Presiding Judge over Forest Park Mayor's Court.

Mr. Coates also served as Trustee, Executive Committee member, Finance Chairman and Facilities Chairman of the Cincinnati-Hamilton County Community Action Agency in the incipient of the Theodore M. Berry Head Start Center in the West End.

While Mayor, Mr. Coates served as Trustee to the Ohio-Kentucky-Indiana Regional Council of Government; serving on the "Transportation Enhancement Policy Task Force" on bike ways, historical preservation, and beautification projects.

As Mayor Mr. Coates was an active participant of the Ohio Mayor's Association, the Ohio Municipal League, and served as Legislative Chairman of the Hamilton County Municipal League.

On City Council Mr. Coates served on Forest Park's Planning Commission and the Cincinnati-Hamilton County Housing Resource Board, and was a charter member of the Forest Park Historical Society.

Prior to serving on Forest Park City Council, Mr. Coates served as Chairman of the Forest Park Beautification and Conservation Commission, initiating the city's Urban Forestry Program that was instrumental in Forest Park being named a "Tree City USA".

Additionally Mr. Coates served on the Forest Park Economic Development Commission encouraging business growth and expanding employment opportunities to area residents, while continuing efforts to enhance the city's image.

Mr. Coates is a member of the Cincinnati Area Board of Realtors and holds his GRI (Graduate Realtors Institute) from the Ohio Association of Realtors and a CRS (Certified Residential Specialist) professional real estate designation from the Realtors National Marketing Institute. Mr. Coates is also a former Legislative Chairman of the Cincinnati Area Board of Realtors, and Trustee of the Ohio Association of Realtors. Mr. Coates received OAR’s "Ben Franklin Award" for writing contributions on real estate industry matters.

Mr. Coates is a former Registered Home Builder and built a Homearama Home in 1981.

Mr. Coates is a former Treasurer of the Reading/Sycamore Fraternal Order of Eagles; a former member of the Florence Kiwanis and Greenhill/Forest Park Kawanis, and the Forest Park Chamber of Commerce.

Mr. Coates served eleven years in the Kentucky Jaycees; and was acknowledged as an "Outstanding State Program Manager" for his environmental programming efforts and recognized as a "Jaycee International Senator" for his leadership, vision, and commitment to the Jaycee organization.

Mr. Coates is also the past President of the St. Matthews Jaycees, a suburb of Louisville, Kentucky.

He is married to his wife Linda and they have two grown daughters; Stephanie and Jamie, and a their granddaughter Ella.
