= Ohio Right to Life =

American anti-abortion organization

- Founder: John C. Willke
- Type: Non-governmental organization
- Purpose: Activism
- Headquarters: Columbus, Ohio
- President: Mike Gonidakis
- Website: www.ohiolife.org

Ohio Right to Life is an anti-abortion group based in Columbus, Ohio. It was established in 1967 by Jack Willke and his wife, Barbara. Its president is Michael Gonidakis, who Ohio Governor John Kasich appointed to the state medical board in 2012.

== History ==
Ohio Right to Life was established in 1967 by Jack Willke and his wife, Barbara. It was incorporated as the Ohio Right to Life Society Inc., with its main offices located in Cleveland, shortly before a state abortion law change was approved by the Ohio House Health and Welfare Committee.

The organization has drawn criticism from other anti-abortion groups for not supporting six-week abortion bans, which it considers to be too drastic a challenge to Roe v. Wade. Instead, they favor "chipping away" at Roe incrementally, beginning with laws banning abortion after 20 weeks' gestation. In 2011, the organization and the Catholic Conference of Ohio opposed a "fetal heartbeat bill", HB 125, introduced in the legislature in 2011. Because of its opposition to six-week abortion bans, Willke himself criticized the organization that year, saying, "...after nearly 40 years of abortion on demand, it's time to take a bold step forward."

In 2017, the organization attempted to lobby the Ohio state legislature to ban dilation and evacuation, a procedure primarily used for second trimester abortions. The suggested ban would not have made exceptions for rape and incest. The suggested ban would have allowed the procedure in cases where it would save the life of the mother or allowed the procedure for miscarriages.

In 2017, several local organizations that were formerly chapters of Ohio Right to Life formed the Right to Life Action Coalition of Ohio (RTLACO), seeking a more aggressive advocacy strategy.

== Leadership ==
Ohio Right to Life's current National Delegate and PAC Chair is Mike Gonidakis. He was appointed to the Ohio State Medical Board in 2012 by Governor John Kasich. Gonadakis is a contract lobbyist for Petland.

Peter Range, former executive director, departed from the group in 2024, citing circumstances within the organization as a hindrance on his ability to lead the group.

Carrie Snyder, formerly a board member, resigned from the board in 2025 to become the executive director. In 2025, she ran for and lost a bid for Wooster, Ohio city council.
