= Jim Raussen =

American politician

Member of the Ohio House of Representatives from the 29th district
- In office January 1, 2003 – September 29, 2008
- Preceded by: Wayne Coates
- Succeeded by: Andrew Ciarfardini

Personal details
- Party: Republican

Jim Raussen is a Republican former member of the Ohio House of Representatives, representing the 28th District from 2003 to 2008.
